= List of South Korean films of 2003 =

A list of films produced in South Korea in 2003:

== Box office ==
The highest-grossing South Korean films released in 2003, by domestic box office admissions, are as follows:

Highest-grossing films released in 2003
Rank	Title	Distributor	Admissions
1	Silmido	Cinema Service	11,074,000
2	Memories of Murder	CJ Entertainment	5,101,645
3	My Tutor Friend	CJ Entertainment	4,809,871
4	Untold Scandal	CJ Entertainment	3,345,268
5	Oldboy	Show East	3,260,000
6	Oh! Brothers	Showbox	3,125,256
7	A Tale of Two Sisters	Cineclick Asia	3,110,000
8	Once Upon a Time in a Battlefield	Cineworld	2,835,000
9	My Teacher, Mr. Kim	Cinema Service	2,470,000
10	Crazy First Love	CJ Entertainment	2,340,000

== A-H ==
English/Korean Title	Director	Cast	Genre	Notes
2003
...ing	Lee Eon-hie	Im Soo-jung; Kim Rae-won		
Acacia	Park Ki-hyung	Shim Hye-jin; Kim Jin-geun	Psychological horror	
Arirang	Lee Doo-yong	Noh Ik-hyun; Hwang Shin-jeong; Lee Pil-mo		Remake of 1926 film Arirang
Au Revoir, UFO	Kim Jin-min	Lee Beom-soo; Lee Eun-ju	Comedy	
Blue	Lee Jung-gook	Shin Hyun-joon; Shin Eun-kyung	War film	
Byul	Jang Hyung-ik	Yu Oh-seong; Park Jin-hee; Kim Kyung-Ae		
The Classic	Kwak Jae-yong	Son Ye-jin; Cho Seung-woo; Zo In-sung		
Crazy First Love	Oh Jong-rok	Cha Tae-hyun; Son Ye-jin; Yoo Dong-geun		
Double Agent	Kim Hyeon-jeong	Han Suk-kyu; Ko So-young		
Doggy Poo	Kwon Oh-sung		Stop motion	
Galgari Family and Dracula	Nam Gi-nam	Park Jun-hyung; Jeong Jong-chul		
Garden of Heaven	Lee Dong-hyeon	Ahn Jae-wook; Lee Eun-ju		
A Good Lawyer's Wife	Im Sang-soo	Moon So-ri; Hwang Jung-min		
The Greatest Expectation	Oh Sang-hoon	Im Chang-jung; Kim Sun-a		
Hammerboy	Ahn Tae-geun		Animated	
Happy Ero Christmas	Lee Geon-dong	Kim Sun-a; Cha Tae-hyun; Park Yeong-gyu		

== I-Z ==
English/Korean Title	Director	Cast	Genre	Notes
If You Were Me	Yim Soon-rye; Jeong Jae-eun; Yeo Kyun-dong; Park Jin-pyo; Park Kwang-su; Park Chan-wook	Ji Jin-hee		Omnibus film
Into the Mirror	Kim Sung-ho	Yoo Ji-tae; Kim Hye-na; Kim Myung-min		
Invisible Light	Gina Kim			
Jealousy Is My Middle Name	Park Chan-ok	Park Hae-il; Bae Jong-ok; Moon Sung-keun; Seo Young-hee		
The Last Supper	Son Yeong-guk	Kim Bo-seong; Jo Yoon-hee; Lee Jong-won	Comedy	
The Legend of the Evil Lake	Lee Kwang-hun			Remake of a 1969 film by Shin Sang-ok
A Letter from Mars	Kim Jung-kwon	Shin Ha-kyun; Kim Hee-sun; Kim Min-jun; Kim In-kwon		
A Little Monk	Joo Kyung-jung			
Love Impossible	Jung Cho-shin	Zo In-sung; Kim In-kwon; Kim Sa-rang; Gong Hyung-jin; Heo Young Ran; Hwangbo	Comedy	
Madeleine	Park Kwang-chun	Zo In-sung; Shin Min-a		
Memories of Murder	Bong Joon-ho	Song Kang-ho; Kim Sang-kyung	Drama; Crime	
Mr. Butterfly	Kim Hyeon-seong	Kim Min-jong; Kim Jung-eun		
Mutt Boy	Kwak Kyung-taek	Jung Woo-sung; Kim Kap-soo		
My Right to Ravage Myself	Jeon Soo-il	Choi Sung-ho; Chu Sang-mi		
My Teacher, Mr. Kim	Jang Gye-seong	Cha Seung-won		
My Tutor Friend	Kim Hyeong-keong	Kim Ha-neul; Kwon Sang-woo		
My Wife Is a Gangster 2	Jeong Heung-sun	Shin Eun-kyung		
Natural City	Min Byeong-cheon	Yoo Ji-tae		
North Korean Guys	Ahn Jin-woo	Jung Joon-ho; Gong Hyung-jin	Comedy	
Oh! Brothers	Kim Yong-hwa	Lee Jung-jae; Lee Beom-soo		
Oh! Happy Day	Yun Hang-ryeol	Jang Na-ra; Park Jung-chul		
Oldboy	Park Chan-wook	Choi Min-sik; Yoo Ji-tae	Thriller; Drama	Won the Grand Prix at Cannes
Once Upon a Time in a Battlefield	Lee Joon-ik	Park Joong-hoon; Jung Jin-young		
Oseam	Seong Baek-yeob		Animated	
Papa, Daddy, Father	Park Ji-won			
Plastic Tree	Eo Il-seon	Jo Eun-sook; Kim In-kwon; Kim Jung-hyun		
Please Teach Me English	Kim Sung-su	Lee Na-young; Jang Hyuk		
Reversal of Fortune	Park Yong-woon	Kim Seung-woo; Ha Ji-won	Romantic comedy	
Rewind	Kim Hak-soon	Jang Hyun-sung; Bang Eun-jin	Romantic drama	About the owner of a video rental shop.
The Road Taken	Hong Ki-seon			
Run 2U	Kang Jung-soo	Chae Jung-an		
Save the Green Planet!	Jang Joon-hwan	Shin Ha-kyun; Baek Yoon-sik	Comedy	Entered into the 25th Moscow International Film Festival
Scent of Love	Lee Jeong-wook	Jang Jin-young; Park Hae-il	Romantic drama	
Season In the Sun		Chang Mi-hee		
Silmido	Kang Woo-suk	Sul Kyung-gu; Ahn Sung-ki; Jung Jae-young		
Singles	Kwon Chil-in	Jang Jin-young; Uhm Jung-hwa; Lee Beom-soo; Kim Joo-hyuk	Romantic comedy	
Sky Blue	Kim Moon-saeng; Park Sun-min		Animated	
Spring Bears Love	Yong Yi	Bae Doona; Kim Nam-jin		
Spring, Summer, Fall, Winter... and Spring	Kim Ki-duk	Oh Yeong-su	Drama	
Sword in the Moon	Kim Ui-seok	Choi Min-soo		Screened at the 2004 Cannes Film Festival
A Tale of Two Sisters	Kim Jee-woon	Im Soo-jung; Moon Geun-young; Yum Jung-ah		
Three	Kim Jee-woon	Jeong Bo-seok; Kim Hye-soo		A multi-lingual trilogy. First story, Memories in Korean
Tube	Beak Woon-hak	Kim Suk-hoon; Bae Doona		
The Uninvited	Lee Soo-yeon	Jun Ji-hyun; Park Shin-yang		
Untold Scandal	E J-yong	Lee Mi-sook; Bae Yong-joon; Jeon Do-yeon		
Wild Card	Kim Yoo-jin	Jung Jin-young; Yang Dong-geun; Han Chae-young		
Wishing Stairs	Yun Jae-yeon	Song Ji-hyo		
