= List of South Korean films of 2001 =

A list of films produced in South Korea in 2001:

== Box office ==
The highest-grossing South Korean films released in 2001, by domestic box office admissions, are as follows:

Highest-grossing films released in 2001
Rank	Title	Distributor	Admissions
1	Friend	Korea Pictures	8,134,500
2	My Sassy Girl	Cinema Service	4,852,845
3	Kick the Moon	Cinema Service	4,353,800
4	My Wife Is a Gangster	Seo Se-won Production	5,180,900
5	Hi! Dharma!	Cineworld	3,746,000
6	My Boss, My Hero	CJ Entertainment	3,302,000
7	Guns & Talks	Cinema Service	2,227,000
8	Musa	CJ Entertainment	2,067,100
9	Volcano High	Cinema Service	1,687,800
10	Bungee Jumping of Their Own	Cineclick Asia	947,000

== Released ==
English/Korean Title	Director	Cast	Genre	Notes
2001
Address Unknown	Kim Ki-duk	Ban Min-jeong		
Bungee Jumping of Their Own	Kim Dae-seung	Lee Byung-hun; Lee Eun-ju		
A Day	Han Ji-seung	Ko So-young; Lee Sung-jae		
Failan	Song Hae-sung	Choi Min-sik; Cecilia Cheung		
Flower Island	Song Il-gon	Seo Joo-hee; Im Yoo-jin; Kim Hye-na		
Friend	Kwak Kyung-taek	Yu Oh-seong; Jang Dong-gun		
Guns & Talks	Jang Jin	Shin Hyun-joon; Shin Ha-kyun; Won Bin		
Hi! Dharma!	Park Cheol-kwan	Park Shin-yang; Jung Jin-young		
I Wish I Had a Wife	Park Heung-sik	Sul Kyung-gu; Jeon Do-yeon		
Kick the Moon	Kim Sang-jin	Cha Seung-won; Lee Sung-jae; Kim Hye-soo		
Last Present	Oh Ki-hwan	Lee Jung-jae; Lee Young-ae		
The Last Witness	Bae Chang-ho	Lee Jung-jae; Ahn Sung-ki; Lee Mi-yeon	Thriller/War	
Musa	Kim Sung-su	Jung Woo-sung; Ahn Sung-ki; Joo Jin-mo; Zhang Ziyi		
My Boss, My Hero	Yoon Je-kyoon	Jung Joon-ho; Jung Woong-in		
My Sassy Girl	Kwak Jae-yong	Jun Ji-hyun; Cha Tae-hyun		
My Wife Is a Gangster	Jo Jin-kyu	Shin Eun-kyung; Park Sang-myun		
Nabi (The Butterfly)	Moon Seung-wook	Kim Ho-jung; Kang Hye-jung; Jang Hyun-sung		
One Fine Spring Day	Hur Jin-ho	Yoo Ji-tae; Lee Young-ae		
Running Seven Dogs	Kim Joo-man	Lee Ji-hyun; Jung So-young; Sung Dong-il		
Say Yes	Kim Sung-hong	Park Joong-hoon; Chu Sang-mi	Thriller	
Sorum	Yoon Jong-chan	Kim Myung-min; Jang Jin-young	Psychological horror	
Summertime	Park Jae-ho	Ryu Soo-young; Kim Ji-hyun		
Take Care of My Cat	Jeong Jae-eun	Bae Doona; Lee Yo-won; Ok Ji-young		
Tears	Im Sang-soo	Bong Tae-gyu; Jo Eun-ji		
Volcano High	Kim Tae-kyun	Jang Hyuk; Shin Min-ah		
Wanee & Junah	Kim Yong-gyun	Kim Hee-sun; Joo Jin-mo		
Waikiki Brothers	Yim Soon-rye	Lee Eol; Park Won-sang; Hwang Jung-min		
Yellow Hair 2	Kim Yu-min	Harisu; Shin Yu	Drama	
