= Battle of Hwangsanbeol =

660 battle between the Korean kingdoms of Baekje and Silla

- Part of Conquest of Baekje by Silla and Tang
Date	July 9, 660 CE
Location	Hwangsanbeol, Baekje (now Nonsan, South Chungcheong Province, South Korea)
Result	Silla victory

Belligerents
Silla	Baekje

Commanders and leaders
Kim Yu-sin; Kim Hŭmsun; Kim Pumil; Bangul †; Gwanchang †	Kyebaek †; Sangyeong (POW); Chungsang (POW)

Strength
50,000	5,000

Casualties and losses
Unknown, but heavy	Annihilation

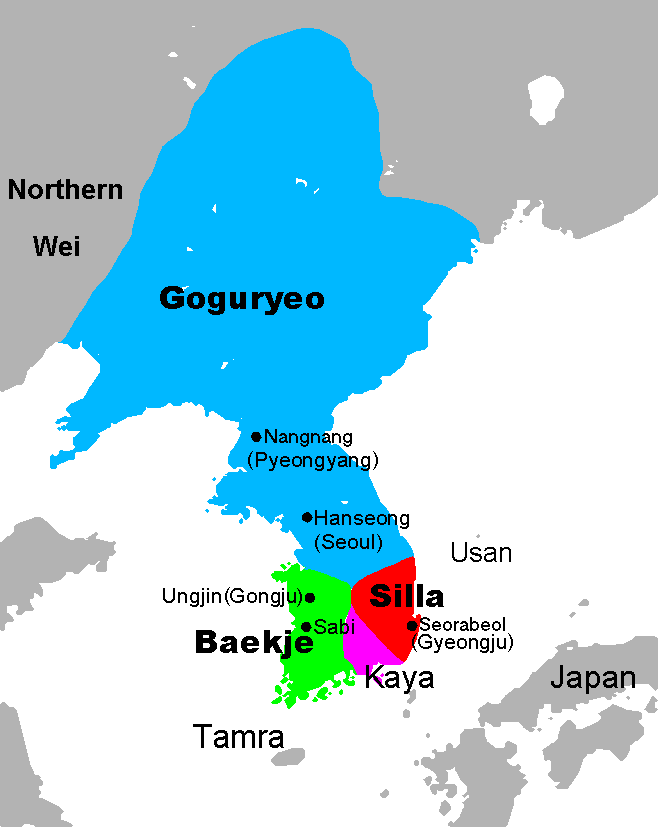
The Three Kingdoms

The Battle of Hwangsanbeol (Korean: 황산벌 전투; Hanja: 黃山伐戰鬪) took place between the forces of Silla and Baekje in Hwangsanbeol (currently Nonsan) in 660.

By the time King Muyeol was able to gain the support of Emperor Gaozong of Tang China to conquer Baekje. King Uija had led Baekje into demise as his parties and dissipation caused neglect for state affairs. In 660, Kim Yu-sin of Silla set out with fifty-thousand troops to rendezvous with the Tang army (size about: 122,711 to 130,000 men) which was being shipped over the sea. When King Uija heard of this crisis, he had already lost support from his ministers and only managed to rally five thousand men. He quickly appointed General Kyebaek as the commander of the armed forces, and sent him out to face Kim Yu-sin in battle.

The Baekje army arrived at Hwangsanbeol first. Kyebaek set up camp and rallied his troops with a heroic speech. He reminded the soldiers of the armies of antiquity when Goujian defeated an allegedly seven hundred-thousand force with a mere five thousand. With this speech, the Baekje forces regained their strength, and prepared for battle with the Silla forces.

Kim Yu-sin soon arrived, and the Silla forces attempted a full attack on the Baekje forces. However, fighting to the death, the Baekje forces soon repelled the enemy, repulsing them five times. The Silla forces gradually lost morale, and the General Kim Pumil sent his young son and Hwarang, Gwanchang, to single-handedly go out and fight the enemy. Gwanchang was captured by the Baekje forces at first and was released by Kyebaek. The young hwarang then returned to the Silla base only to once again charge out at the enemy. Kyebaek captured him once more, and because he respected his young enemy, he executed Gwanchang and sent his body to the Silla base.

Through Gwanchang's martyrdom, the Silla forces' morale returned and Kim Yu-sin ordered a full attack on the dwindling Baekje forces. In the end, Kim Yu-sin's Silla forces won and Kyebaek died in battle. Kim later stated that his enemy was a man of honor and bravery.

Baekje soon fell when Kim Yu-Sin and the Tang general Su Dingfang surrounded Gongju and King Uija surrendered.

== Modern depiction ==
The Korean comedy war film about this battle, called Once Upon a Time in a Battlefield, stars Park Joong-hoon and Jung Jin-young. The Korean Dramas Gyebaek (TV series) and Queen Seondeok (TV series) touch on the lives of Kim Yu-sin and Kyebaek leading to the war and eventual fall of Baekje.

During the Baekje festival held in Buyeo and elsewhere, there was a re-enactment of the battle in 2008, performed at the park in Nonsan along the river.
