= Jung Jin-young =

Jung Jin-young may refer to:

- Jung Jin-young (actor) (born 1964), South Korean actor
- Jung Jin-young (singer) (born 1991), South Korean musician
