= List of awards and nominations received by Lee Jung-jae =

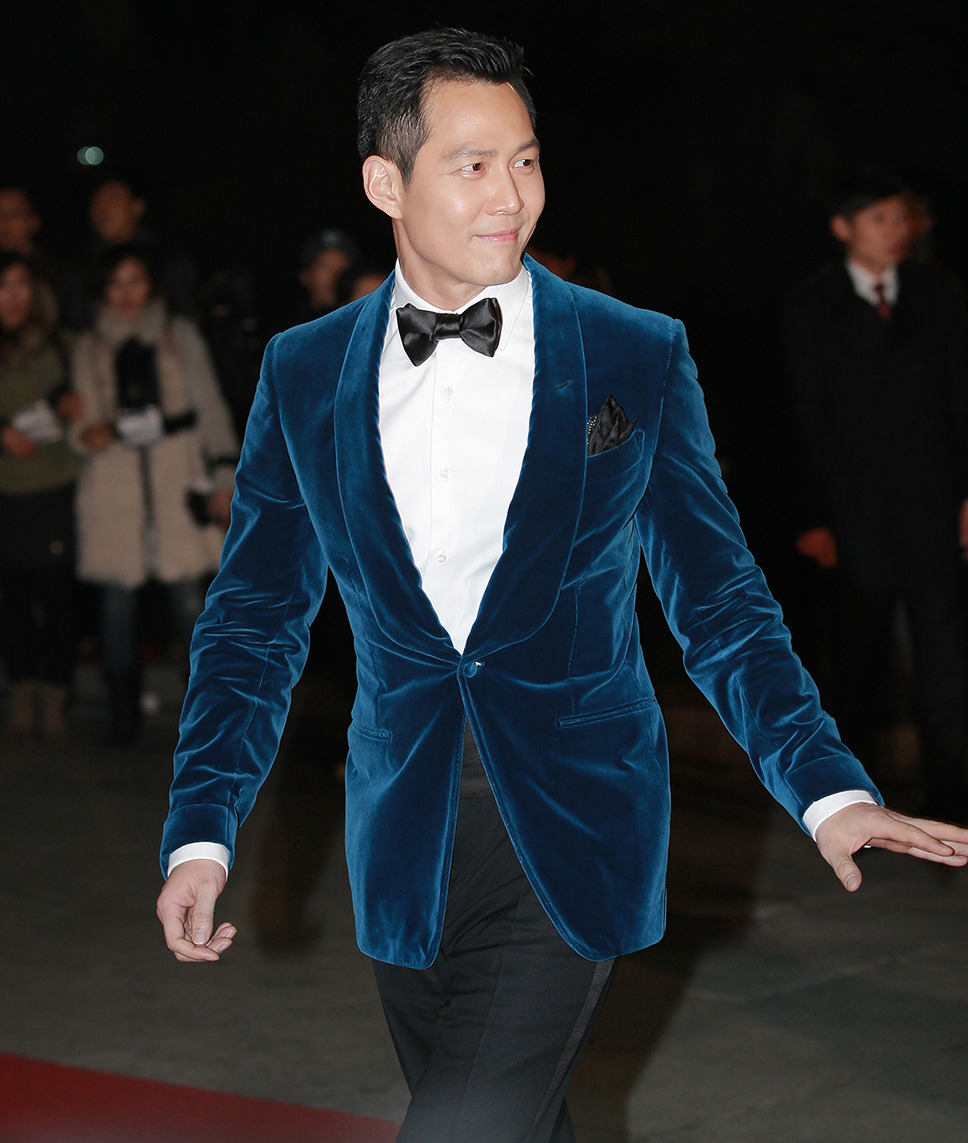
Lee at the 34th Blue Dragon Film Awards in 2013

This is a list of awards and nominations received by South Korean actor, model and businessman Lee Jung-jae. Lee is acknowledged for his roles in a variety of film genres, and is internationally famous for his role as Seong Gi-hun in Squid Game (2021–2025).

== Awards and nominations ==
Name of the award ceremony, year presented, category, nominee of the award, and the result of the nomination
| Award ceremony | Year | Category | Nominee / Work | Result | Ref. |
|---|---|---|---|---|---|
| AACTA International Awards | 2022 | Best Actor in a Series | Squid Game | Nominated | |
| APAN Star Awards | 2022 | Top Excellence Award, Actor in an OTT Drama | Squid Game | Nominated | |
| Asia Artist Awards | 2020 | Grand Prize (Daesang) – Film (Note: A Daesang (Korean: 대상), which translates to "Grand Prize", is the highest honor given out at South Korean award ceremonies.) | Deliver Us from Evil | Won | |
| Asia Artist Awards | 2021 | Fabulous Award – Actor | Squid Game | Won | |
| Asia Artist Awards | 2021 | Actor of the Year (Daesang) | Squid Game | Won | |
| Asia Artist Awards | 2021 | Hot Trend Awards | Squid Game | Won | |
| Asian Film Critics Association Awards | 2016 | Best Actor | Assassination | Nominated | |
| Baeksang Arts Awards | 1995 | Best New Actor – Television | Sandglass | Won | |
| Baeksang Arts Awards | 1995 | Best New Actor – Film | The Young Man | Won | |
| Baeksang Arts Awards | 1997 | Most Popular Actor – Film | Firebird | Won | |
| Baeksang Arts Awards | 1999 | Best Actor – Film | City of the Rising Sun | Nominated | |
| Baeksang Arts Awards | 1999 | Most Popular Actor – Film | City of the Rising Sun | Won | |
| Baeksang Arts Awards | 2000 | Best Actor - Film | The Uprising | Nominated | |
| Baeksang Arts Awards | 2014 | Best Supporting Actor – Film | The Face Reader | Won | |
| Baeksang Arts Awards | 2015 | InStyle Fashionista Award | Lee Jung-jae | Won | |
| Baeksang Arts Awards | 2021 | Best Actor – Film | Deliver Us from Evil | Nominated | |
| Baeksang Arts Awards | 2022 | Best Actor – Television | Squid Game | Nominated | |
| Baeksang Arts Awards | 2023 | Best Director | Hunt | Nominated | |
| Baeksang Arts Awards | 2023 | Best New Director | Hunt | Nominated | |
| Baeksang Arts Awards | 2023 | Best Screenplay | Hunt | Nominated | |
| Beautiful Artist Awards (Shin Young-kyun Arts and Culture Foundation) | 2023 | Film Artist Award | Squid Game | Won | |
| Blue Dragon Film Awards | 1995 | Best New Actor | The Young Man | Won | |
| Blue Dragon Film Awards | 1998 | Best Leading Actor | An Affair | Nominated | |
| Blue Dragon Film Awards | 1999 | Best Leading Actor | City of the Rising Sun | Won | |
| Blue Dragon Film Awards | 2013 | Best Supporting Actor | The Face Reader | Won | |
| Blue Dragon Film Awards | 2015 | Best Leading Actor | Assassination | Nominated | |
| Blue Dragon Film Awards | 2021 | Best Leading Actor | Deliver Us from Evil | Nominated | |
| Blue Dragon Film Awards | 2022 | Best New Director | Hunt | Won | |
| Blue Dragon Film Awards | 2022 | Best Film (as producer) | Hunt | Nominated | |
| Blue Dragon Film Awards | 2022 | Best Screenplay | Hunt | Nominated | |
| Blue Dragon Series Awards | 2022 | Best Leading Actor | Squid Game | Won | |
| Buil Film Awards | 2014 | Best Supporting Actor | The Face Reader | Nominated | |
| Buil Film Awards | 2015 | Best Actor | Assassination | Won | |
| Buil Film Awards | 2020 | Best Actor | Deliver Us from Evil | Nominated | |
| Buil Film Awards | 2022 | Best New Director | Hunt | Won | |
| Chaplin Award | 2025 | Chaplin Award Asia | Lee Jung-jae | Won | |
| Chunsa Film Art Awards | 2014 | Best Actor | The Face Reader | Nominated | |
| Chunsa Film Art Awards | 2021 | Best Actor | Deliver Us from Evil | Nominated | |
| Critics' Choice Super Awards | 2022 | Best Actor in an Action Series | Squid Game | Won | |
| Critics' Choice Television Awards | 2022 | Best Actor in a Drama Series | Squid Game | Won | |
| Director's Cut Awards | 2022 | Best Actor in Series | Squid Game | Nominated | |
| Director's Cut Awards | 2023 | Best New Director | Hunt | Nominated | |
| Elle Style Awards | 2018 | Super Icon (Male) | Lee Jung-jae | Won | |
| Fantasporto Director's Week | 2011 | Best Actor | The Housemaid | Won | |
| Gold Derby Awards | 2022 | Best Drama Actor | Squid Game | Nominated | |
| Gold Derby Awards | 2025 | Best Drama Actor | Squid Game season 2 | Won | |
| Golden Cinematography Awards | 2006 | Best Actor | Typhoon | Won | |
| Golden Globe Awards | 2022 | Best Actor – Television Series Drama | Squid Game | Nominated | |
| Golden Lotus Awards | 2016 | Best Actor | Tik tok | Nominated | |
| Gotham Awards | 2021 | Outstanding Performance in New Series | Squid Game | Nominated | |
| Grand Bell Awards | 1995 | Best New Actor | The Young Man | Won | |
| Grand Bell Awards | 1999 | Best Actor | City of the Rising Sun | Nominated | |
| Grand Bell Awards | 2001 | Best Actor | Last Present | Nominated | |
| Grand Bell Awards | 2006 | Best Actor | Typhoon | Nominated | |
| Grand Bell Awards | 2013 | Best Actor | The Face Reader | Nominated | |
| Grand Bell Awards | 2013 | Popularity Award | The Face Reader | Won | |
| Grand Bell Awards | 2022 | Best New Director | Hunt | Nominated | |
| Grand Bell Awards | 2022 | Best Film | Hunt | Nominated | |
| Grand Bell Awards | 2022 | Best Screenplay | Hunt | Nominated | |
| Hawaii Film Critics Society Awards | 2022 | Best New Filmmaker | Hunt | Won | |
| Hollywood Critics Association (HCA) TV Awards | 2022 | Best Actor in a Streaming Series, Drama | Squid Game | Won | |
| Independent Spirit Awards | 2022 | Best Male Performance in a New Scripted Series | Squid Game | Won | |
| KBS Drama Awards | 1994 | Best New Actor | Feelings, The Lonely Man | Nominated | |
| Kinolights Awards | 2021 | Actor of the Year (Domestic) | Squid Game | 4th place | |
| Kinolights Awards | 2022 | Actor of the Year (Domestic) | Hunt | 4th place | |
| Korean Association of Film Critics Awards | 1995 | Best New Actor | The Young Man | Won | |
| Korean Association of Film Critics Awards | 1999 | Best Actor | City of the Rising Sun | Won | |
| Korean Association of Film Critics Awards | 2013 | CJ CGV Star Award | New World, The Face Reader | Won | |
| Korean Association of Film Critics Awards | 2013 | Best Actor | The Face Reader | Nominated | |
| Korean Association of Film Critics Awards | 2022 | Best New Director | Hunt | Won | |
| Korea Drama Awards | 2019 | Top Excellence Award, Actor | Chief of Staff | Nominated | |
| Korean Film Reporters Association Film Awards | 2014 | Best Supporting Actor | The Face Reader | Won | |
| Korea Image Awards | 2023 | Korea Image Stepping Stone Award | Squid Game, Hunt | Won | |
| Marie Claire Asia Star Awards | 2015 | Actor of the Year | Assassination | Won | |
| London Asian Film Festival | 2022 | Honorary Award | Hunt | Won | |
| Max Movie Awards | 2014 | Best Supporting Actor | The Face Reader | Nominated | |
| Max Movie Awards | 2016 | Best Actor | Assassination | Nominated | |
| Mnet 20's Choice Awards | 2010 | Most Influential Star 20 | Lee Jung-jae | Won | |
| National Brand Awards | 2022 | National Brand Awards in the field of culture | Lee Jung-jae | Won | |
| Primetime Emmy Awards | 2022 | Outstanding Lead Actor in a Drama Series | Squid Game | Won | |
| SBS Drama Awards | 1995 | Best New Actor | Sandglass | Won | |
| Screen Actors Guild Awards | 2022 | Outstanding Performance by a Male Actor in a Drama Series | Squid Game | Won | |
| Screen Actors Guild Awards | 2022 | Outstanding Performance by an Ensemble in a Drama Series | Squid Game | Nominated | |
| Seoul Success Awards | 2022 | Popular Culture Grand Prize – Actor | Lee Jung-jae | Won | |
| Style Icon Awards | 2008 | Style Icon Actor | Lee Jung-jae | Won | |
| Style Icon Awards | 2016 | Bonsang | Lee Jung-jae | Won | |
| Verona Love Screens Film Festival | 2002 | Best Actor | Asako in Ruby Shoes | Won | |
| Visionary Awards (Note: Visionary Awards, which started in 2020, selects and awards people who lead roles in the Korean entertainment industry. It highlights the meaning and achievements of a person whose chosen trend keywords penetrated the entertainment industry, including broadcasting, movies, music, and performances, and presents the next vision of the cultural sector with outstanding achievements and influence.) | 2023 | 2023 Visionary | Lee Jung-jae | Won | |

== Other accolades ==
=== State honors ===
(Order of Cultural Merit, 1st Class, 2022)

Name of country, award ceremony, year given, and name of honor
| Country | Award Ceremony | Year | Honor | Ref. |
|---|---|---|---|---|
| South Korea | The 38th Savings Day (Note: Hosted by the Financial Services Commission, it is an annual event to promote a culture of saving, prudent financial management, and to recognize individuals for exemplary saving practices.) | 2001 | Prime Minister's Commendation | |
| South Korea | Korean Popular Culture and Arts Awards (Note: Arranged by the Korea Creative Content Agency and hosted by the Ministry of Culture, Sports and Tourism. It honors those who have contributed to the arts and South Korea's pop culture.) | 2025 | Foreign Minister's Award | |
| South Korea | Newsis K-Expo Cultural Awards (Note: Co-sponsored by Korea's Ministry of Culture, Sports and Tourism, Ministry of Trade, Industry, and Energy, Korea Communications Commission, and Korea Creative Content Agency, it awards cultural icons and businesses that promote the sustainability of the Korean Wave and boost the industry's competitiveness.) | 2025 | Minister of Foreign Affairs Award | |

=== Listicles ===
Name of publisher, year listed, name of listicle, and placement
| Publisher | Year | Listicle | Rank | Ref. |
|---|---|---|---|---|
| Forbes Korea | 2016 | Power Celebrity | 24th | |
| Forbes Korea | 2022 | Power Celebrity | 18th | |
| Gallup Korea | 2021 | Film Actor of the Year | 1st | |
| Gallup Korea | 2021 | Television Actor of the Year | 2nd | |
| Gallup Korea | 2022 | Film Actor of the Year | 1st | |
| Gold House (Note: The A100 List honours the most impactful Asians and Asian American & Pacific Islanders (AAPIs) in culture every May for AAPI Heritage Month. Gold House "champions trailblazing members of the AAPI community and their transformative contributions to entertainment, fashion, lifestyle, technology, business, social activism and politics from the past year".) | 2022 | A100 List (with Squid Games Creator & Stars) | Included | |
| Gold House | 2024 | A100 Most Impactful Asians List | Included | |
| Korea Newspaper Journalists Association | 2025 | 100 Great Koreans Awards | Included | |
| Korea Newspaper Journalists Association | 2026 | K-Culture 100 Great Koreans Awards | Included | |
| Korean Film Council | 2021 | Korean Actors 200 (Note: Introduces 200 actors that best represent the present and future of Korean cinema to the people in the film industry all over the world.) | Included | |
| The New York Times | 2021 | The 13 Breakout TV Stars of 2021 | Included | |
