= Oh! Brothers (2003 film) =

2003 film by Kim Yong-hwa

- Theatrical release poster
- Hangul: 오! 브라더스
- RR: O! Beuradeoseu
- MR: O! Pŭradŏsŭ
- Directed by: Kim Yong-hwa
- Written by: Kim Yong-hwa
- Produced by: Park Moo-seung
- Starring: Lee Jung-jae; Lee Beom-soo
- Cinematography: Park Hyeon-cheol
- Edited by: Park Gok-ji
- Music by: Kim Deok-yun
- Production company: KM Culture
- Distributed by: Showbox
- Release date: September 5, 2003
- Running time: 110 minutes
- Country: South Korea
- Language: Korean

Oh! Brothers (Korean: 오! 브라더스) is a 2003 South Korean comedy film written and directed by Kim Yong-hwa. It stars Lee Jung-jae and Lee Beom-soo as two half-brothers who have never met before and regain their brotherly love when they meet by chance. The film was released theatrically on September 5, 2003.

== Plot ==
Sang-woo, a detective and debt collector, also works as a paparazzi photographer, often facing harassment from his boss Jeong. One day, Sang-woo's account is suspended due to debts owed by his father and his father's second wife. To resolve this, Sang-woo tracks down his half-brother Bong-goo, who is registered as a disabled person.

Surprisingly, Bong-goo appears much older than his age and engages in inappropriate behavior. Sang-woo initially tries to shirk responsibility but later learns he can claim 7 million won if he registers Bong-goo in the family register. Throughout their interactions, Sang-woo faces various misunderstandings, including being mistaken for gay and dealing with Bong-goo's diabetic condition.

As they team up to collect debts, their relationship evolves. However, conflicts arise when Bong-goo and Ki-tae pressure Sang-woo into accepting a job he doesn't want. Sang-woo ultimately helps Bong-goo find his mother and exposes Chief Jeong's corruption.

== Cast ==
- Lee Jung-jae as Oh Sang-woo, a detective
- Lee Beom-soo as Oh Bong-goo, a patient with progeria
- Lee Moon-sik as Jeong
- Ryu Seung-soo as Heo Gi-tae
- Kim Jun-hee as Eun-ha

== Reception ==
As of July 30, 2024, Oh! Brothers has attracted over 3.1 million viewers nationwide, becoming the sixth-highest-grossing South Korean film of 2003.
