= Blue Swallow (film) =

- Blue Swallow promotional film poster.
- Hangul: 청연
- Hanja: 靑燕
- RR: Cheongyeon
- MR: Ch'ŏngyŏn
- Directed by: Yoon Jong-chan
- Written by: Yoon Jong-chan; Lee In-hwa
- Based on: Life of Park Kyung-won
- Produced by: Kim Jae-young; Yang Guk-seok
- Starring: Jang Jin-young; Kim Joo-hyuk
- Cinematography: Yoon Hong-sik
- Edited by: Hahm Sung-won; Kim Hyeong-ju
- Music by: Michael Staudacher
- Distributed by: Korea Pictures
- Release date: December 29, 2005
- Running time: 133 minutes
- Country: South Korea
- Languages: Korean; Japanese
- Budget: ₩9.5 billion
- Box office: US$3,054,367

Blue Swallow (Korean: 청연) is a 2005 South Korean film based on the true story of Park Kyung-won, an early Korean female pilot. The film became controversial when Park's alleged pro-Japanese activities came to light. It was also found that she was not, as the filmmakers had thought, the first female pilot from Korea; this distinction in fact belonged to Kwon Ki-ok of the Republic of China Air Force. Despite excellent reviews and Park's biographer pointing out factual errors in these accusations, it resulted in the under-performance of Blue Swallow at the box office.

== Cast ==
- Jang Jin-young ... Park Kyung-won
- Kim Joo-hyuk ... Han Ji-hyeok
- Yu Min ... Masako Kibe
- Han Ji-min ... Lee Jeong-hee
- Tōru Nakamura ... Flight instructor
- Takeo Nakahara ... Foreign Minister
- Kim Tae-hyun ... Kang Se-gi
- Ko Joo-yeon ... Park Kyung-won as a child
- Kim Gi-cheon

== Awards and nominations ==
2006 Baeksang Arts Awards

- Nominated - Best Actress: Jang Jin-young

2006 Grand Bell Awards

- Best Music: Michael Staudacher
- Best Sound: Eun Hee-soo
- Nominated - Best Actress: Jang Jin-young
- Nominated - Best New Actress: Han Ji-min
- Nominated - Best Cinematography: Yoon Hong-sik
- Nominated - Best Lighting: Choi Seok-jae
- Nominated - Best Art Direction: Takeuchi Koichi
- Nominated - Best Costume Design: Kwon Yu-jin
- Nominated - Best Visual Effects: Kang Jong-ik, Han Tae-jeong

2006 Korean Film Awards

- Nominated - Best Cinematography: Yoon Hong-sik
- Nominated - Best Art Direction: Takeuchi Koichi
- Nominated - Best Sound: Eun Hee-soo
- Nominated - Best Visual Effects: Kang Jong-ik, Han Tae-jeong

2006 Korean Association of Film Critics Awards

- Best Actress: Jang Jin-young
- Best Cinematography: Yoon Hong-sik
