= Lobbyist (TV series) =

South Korean TV drama series

- Promotional poster for Lobbyist
- Written by: Choi Wan-kyu; Joo Chan-ok
- Directed by: Lee Hyun-jik; Boo Sung-chul
- Starring: Song Il-kook; Jang Jin-young; Han Jae-suk
- Country of origin: South Korea
- No. of episodes: 24

Production
- Production locations: South Korea; Kyrgyzstan; United States
- Running time: Wednesdays and Thursdays at 21:55 (KST)
- Production companies: Korea Pictures International, Inc. Chorokbaem Media; Yedang Entertainment

Original release
- Network: Seoul Broadcasting System
- Release: October 3 – December 26, 2007

Lobbyist (Korean: 로비스트), originally titled Angel, is a 2007 South Korean television series produced by Korea Pictures International, Inc. that aired on SBS. Budgeted at ₩12 million, overseas filming locations included the United States and Kyrgyzstan. It stars Song Il-kook, Han Jae-suk and Jang Jin-young (in her last performance).

== Plot ==
Lobbyist centers around a fictional love story caught in the real-world scenario of international politics, secret weapons trading, and deadly lobbying activities.

Kang Tae-hyuk is the successor of a main munitions business company in Korea. He has an innate ability as a lobbyist and is a master schemer. His exploits take him to the United States where he deals with the mafia. He plans to sweep over the whole of Asia.

== Cast ==
- Song Il-kook as Harry / Kim Joo-ho
  - Lee Hyun-woo as young Joo-ho
- Jang Jin-young as Maria / Yoo So-young
  - Nam Ji-hyun as young So-young
- Han Jae-suk as Kang Tae-hyuk
- Huh Joon-ho as James Lee
- Kim Mi-sook as Madam Chae
- Yoo Sun as Eva / Yoo Moon-young
  - Park Eun-bin as young Moon-young
- Choi Ja-hye as Karen / Kim Soo-ji
- Kim Sung-kyum as Chairman Kang, Tae-hyuk's father
- Lee Jae-yong as Jang Tae-sung, Mi-ran's father
- Jung Yoon-jo as Jang Mi-ran
- Sung Ji-ru as Yoo Sung-shik, Maria and Eva's father
- Lee Mi-young as Kim Jung-soon, Maria and Eva's mother
- Kim Da-hyun as Andy, Madam Chae's son
- Sung Chang-hoon as Yang Dong-jin
- Jun-seong Kim as Michael
- Choi Min as "Yankee"
- Bang Gil-seung as Park So-ja
- Kim Yang-woo as "Brown Bear"
- Kim Seo-ra as Maggie, Harry's aunt
- Lee Seung-hyung as Kang Tae-joon, Tae-hyuk's stepbrother
- Lee Jin-ah as Reporter Song
- Manny Oliverez as mafia thug
- Devin Rumer as mafia thug
- John J. Quinn as Luciano
- Brian Townes as Jack
- James Nalitz as butler
- Jefferson Smith as chauffeur
- Park Ji-yeon as friend of deaf daughter (bit part, ep 21-22)

== Ratings ==
Date	Episode	Nationwide	Seoul
2007-10-10	1	12.6% (6th)	13.8% (6th)
2007-10-10	2	12.0% (9th)	13.5% (7th)
2007-10-11	3	15.7% (3rd)	16.6% (4th)
2007-10-11	4	14.1% (7th)	16.2% (5th)
2007-10-17	5	14.0% (6th)	15.3% (6th)
2007-10-18	6	15.6% (7th)	16.5% (6th)
2007-10-24	7	14.4% (6th)	15.3% (6th)
2007-10-25	8	21.3% (3rd)	22.4% (3rd)
2007-10-31	9	14.9% (6th)	16.2% (5th)
2007-11-01	10	14.7% (6th)	15.5% (6th)
2007-11-07	11	12.3% (11th)	13.1% (8th)
2007-11-08	12	12.3% (11th)	12.6% (9th)
2007-11-14	13	13.3% (8th)	13.9% (7th)
2007-11-15	14	12.2% (9th)	12.6% (8th)
2007-11-21	15	11.0% (14th)	11.5% (12th)
2007-11-22	16	11.6% (12th)	11.8% (12th)
2007-11-28	17	10.5% (15th)	10.3% (16th)
2007-11-29	18	12.6% (11th)	12.8% (11th)
2007-12-05	19	10.1% (17th)	10.1% (17th)
2007-12-06	20	14.6% (5th)	15.3% (3rd)
2007-12-12	21	12.1% (9th)	12.5% (9th)
2007-12-13	22	14.1% (8th)	14.9% (8th)
2007-12-20	23	11.6% (9th)	12.0% (10th)
2007-12-26	24	11.1% (12th)	11.6% (11th)
Average		13.3%	14.0%

Source: TNmS Media Korea
