= Park Kyung-won =

Korean aviator (1901–1933)

- Park in 1927 as "Miss Boku"
- Born: June 24, 1901; Daegu, Gyeongsang-do, Korean Empire (now South Korea)
- Died: August 7, 1933 (aged 32); Hakone, Kanagawa, Empire of Japan (now Japan)
- Occupation: Aviator

- Park Kyung-won
- Hangul: 박경원
- Hanja: 朴敬元
- RR: Bak Gyeongwon
- MR: Pak Kyŏngwŏn

Park Kyung-won (Korean: 박경원; 24 June 1901 – 7 August 1933) was the first female Korean civilian aviator.

Park is not the first female Korean pilot, however. That title is generally given to Kwon Ki-ok, who was trained by the Republic of China Air Force.

Park is the subject of the controversial 2005 South Korean film Blue Swallow, in which she was portrayed by actress Jang Jin-young.

== Early life ==
Park was born in Daegu, Gyeongsang-do. From 1912 to 1916, she attended Daegu's Myeongsin Women's School, a Presbyterian missionary school operated by Americans; a year after her graduation, on 13 September 1917, she departed her hometown for Japan. Upon her arrival in Japan, she initially settled in Yokohama's Minamiyoshida-machi, where she enrolled in the Kasahara Industrial Training School, spending two, and a half years. From 1919, she began attending a Korean church in Yokohama, and later converted to Christianity. In February 1920, she returned to Daegu to enter a nursing school there; though her true aim was to become a pilot, she needed to earn money for the tuition fees first.

== Aviation career ==
In January 1925, Park returned to Japan, where she finally enrolled in an aviation school in Kamata (present-day Ōta, Tokyo). She had initially hoped to attend the same flight school as An Chang-nam, the first Korean male pilot, but it had burned down in 1923. She graduated and took the test for her third-class pilot's licence on 25 January 1927; she obtained the licence three days later. On 30 July of the following year, she obtained her second-class pilot's licence.

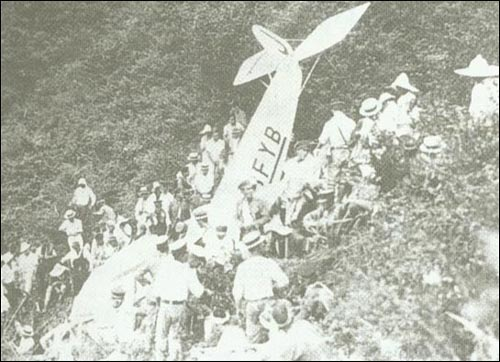
Park's crash site

On 4 May 1933, Park was chosen to fly on a new route between Japan and Manchukuo. She flew to Seoul on 19 May to meet with government officials there. At 10:35 AM on 7 August 1933, she took off in her Salmson 2 A2 biplane, named the Blue Swallow, from Tokyo's Haneda Airport on one such flight to Manchuria; she crashed 42 minutes later near Hakone, Kanagawa and died.
