= Seo Wal-bo =

Korean aviator (1886–1926)

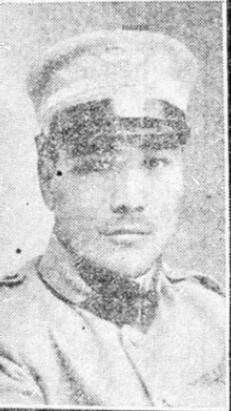
- Image of Seo in The Dong-A Ilbo (1926)
- Born: Wonsan
- Occupation: Aviator

Korean name
- Hangul: 서왈보
- Hanja: 徐曰甫
- RR: Seo Walbo
- MR: Sŏ Walbo

Seo Wal-bo (Korean: 서왈보; 1886–1926) was a Korean fighter pilot and independence activist. He is considered one of the first Koreans to ever fly a plane, although it has recently been discovered that Lee Eung-ho (George Lee), an ethnic Korean in the United States, flew in 1918, before Seo.

== Biography ==
Seo initially studied in the educational institution Daesung School, founded by Ahn Changho. He later moved to Siberia and led the military training of independence activists. After training in a Chinese military school in 1909 and 1915, he became one of the Chinese soldiers. After 1919, his main focus of his movement happened in Southern Manchuria. This is where he went to an aviation school in Beijing, which led him to become a pilot. He also once led an air brigade of Chinese warlord Feng Yuxiang. Seo was part of the Korean independence activist group Damuldan (多勿團), a group that was formed in Beijing in 1925. Seo died from a plane accident while going on a test flight with a plane made in Italy.

== Award ==
Seo was posthumously awarded the National medal of the Order of Merit for National Foundation in 1990.

== "First Pilot" ==
Seo used to be credited as the first Korean pilot ever to exist in history, however, an earlier example in 1918 exists, whose name was George Lee (Lee Eung-ho), who made his first flight in 1918 as part of the American Air Force.

== See also ==
- An Chang-nam
