= Ghost in Love =

- Theatrical poster
- Directed by: Lee Kwang-hoon
- Written by: Li Hong-zhou
- Produced by: Kang Woo-suk
- Starring: Kim Hee-sun; Lee Sung-jae; Cha Seung-won; Yu Hye-jeong; Jang Jin-young
- Cinematography: Park Hyun-cheol
- Edited by: Lee Hyeon-mi
- Music by: Oh Jin-woo
- Distributed by: Cinema Service
- Release date: August 14, 1999 (South Korea)
- Running time: 91 minutes
- Country: South Korea
- Language: Korean

Ghost in Love (Korean: 자귀모; RR: Jagwimo; aka Suicide Ghost Club) is a 1999 South Korean film written by Li Hong-zhou and directed by Lee Kwang-hoon. The film stars Kim Hee-sun in the title role as the girlfriend of a man she suspects of cheating on her. She throws herself underneath an oncoming train (with some help from nearby ghosts), and discovers that in the afterlife she can roam as a ghost and take revenge, if she wants to, on her former boyfriend, who has quickly moved on. Lee Sung-jae also stars as Kantorates, a ghost who befriends the protagonist. The film was released on August 14, 1999.

== Cast ==
- Kim Hee-sun as Jin Chae-byul
- Lee Sung-jae as Kantorates
- Cha Seung-won as Na Han-su
- Yu Hye-jeong as Baek
- Jang Jin-young as Lee Young-eun
- Lee Yeong-ja as Deity
- Myeong Gye-nam as Sales manager (1)
- Park Kwang-jeong as Sales manager (2)
- Jeong Won-jung as Messenger of Death (1)
- Jang Se-jin as Messenger of Death (2)
- Kim Si-won as Hyun-ju
- Jae Hee as Chae-byul's younger brother
- Kim Myeong-su
