= Sorum =

2001 film by Yoon Jong-chan

- Theatrical poster
- Hangul: 소름
- RR: Soreum
- MR: Sorŭm
- Directed by: Yoon Jong-chan
- Written by: Yoon Jong-chan
- Produced by: Hwang Pil-seon
- Starring: Kim Myung-min; Jang Jin-young
- Cinematography: Hwang Seo-sik
- Edited by: Kyung Min-ho
- Music by: Park Jeong-ho; Yoon Min-hwa
- Distributed by: Buena Vista International
- Release date: August 4, 2001
- Running time: 112 minutes
- Country: South Korea
- Language: Korean

Sorum (Korean: 소름) is a 2001 South Korean horror film and the feature film debut of director Yoon Jong-chan. Starring Kim Myung-min and Jang Jin-young, it tells the story of a young taxi driver who moves into a dilapidated old apartment building, the site of a brutal tragedy thirty years earlier. The film has been nominated for and won several awards.

== Plot ==
Looking for a fresh start, young taxi driver Yong-hyun (Kim Myung-min) moves into Apt. 504 of Migum Apartments, an aging tenement. As he unpacks, he is visited by a neighbor, Mr. Lee (Gi Ju-bong), a divorced writer. Hyun begins his night shift after stopping by a nearby store where another neighbor, Sun-yeong (Jang Jin-young), works.

The next day, his old friend visits, and Hyun asks him about Mee-jung, a woman who borrowed money in his name and fled. That night, Hyun spots Yeong on the way and offers her a ride home. Upon arrival, her abusive estranged husband barges into her apartment, assaults her, and leaves with her money. Hyun checks on Yeong and finds her on the rooftop, seemingly about to jump, but his presence stops her.

Later, Yeong's friend Eun-soo (Jo An), a music teacher, visits her at work and mentions recurring dreams of her late boyfriend. The next day, Yeong and Soo run into Hyun at the theater. Hyun and Yeong visit nearby spots, where she reveals that Kwang-tae (Jin Tae-hyun), the previous tenant of his apartment and Soo's boyfriend, died there.

Returning from his shift, Hyun finds a hysterical Yeong—she has just killed her husband, who came back for more. Hyun buries his body in the mountains and tries to calm her. Later, they grow closer and become intimate. Yeong reveals she never divorced her husband, fearing loneliness after her mother's death and her father's mental decline before he left her.

While Hyun gets a haircut at the barbershop, Lee and the barber comment on a couple's photo on the wall, revealing that they lived in Hyun's apartment 30 years ago. The husband had an affair with a woman next door, murdered his wife, fled with the woman, and abandoned his infant son. Only after a stove fire broke out did they discover the woman's corpse and the nearly starved baby with a scorched back. Stunned, Hyun recalls his own unexplained birthmark, suspecting a connection. Lee reveals to Hyun that Yeong has lost her child and that Kwang-tae came to the building for inspiration to write a novel. He recalls how Tae died in an unexplained fire, with flames consuming only his body while the rest of the room remained untouched. Lee believes the misfortunes in the building stem from the curse of the murdered mother.

Later, police question Hyun about Mee-jung's disappearance. While helping at Hyun's place, Yeong finds a hidden bag of jewelry in the fridge and secretly takes a ring without Hyun noticing. Later, she gifts Hyun a muffler, and soon after, he notices the ring is missing and realizes Yeong stole it.

Lee burns Tae's notes but is confronted by Soo, who accuses him of stealing them from Tae's apartment instead of helping him during the fire. Soo suspects Lee was involved in the fire that killed Tae, but Yeong disagrees. Soo warns Yeong that Hyun may be dangerous and accuses her of using him. Yeong admits she doesn't care about Hyun's background and needs comfort, not love. Overhearing this, Hyun becomes furious. Soo later recalls being pregnant with Tae's child and how he once mentioned a woman's ghost in his apartment who said her child was coming.

After days of avoiding each other, Hyun invites Yeong on a trip. Both drunk, Hyun reveals how a school bully relentlessly mocked his orphanhood, leading him to kill the bully. At a motel, Yeong is haunted by flashbacks of her son suffocating to death in a cupboard while hiding from her husband's assault on her. She later buried him in secret. She decides to leave, but Hyun confronts her for using him like Mee-jung and demands the stolen ring. The argument escalates when Hyun taunts her about losing her son. Enraged, she mocks him for being an orphan, and in a fit of fury, he strangles her to death with the muffler she had gifted him.

As he prepares to bury her, he finds an old photograph of her with her parents in her purse. To his horror, the man in the photo resembles the man in the couple's photo at the barbershop. To be sure, he breaks into the barbershop and realizes they are indeed the same.

Paranoid and shattered, Hyun returns to the building and finds a disheartened Lee, devastated by the rejection of his novel by publishers. Knowing that Lee depicted him as the ghost's son in the novel, Hyun, consumed by rage, violently beats Lee nearly to death. Determined to leave, Hyun gathers his important belongings.

As Hyun exits the building, he hears faint cries of a baby, causing him to stop. Turning around, he experiences something inexplicable as a mother's lullaby begins to echo. Overcome with emotion, he breaks down. In the final shot, from a distance, Hyun is seen facing a faint image resembling a woman.

== Theme ==
Jang's first leading role in Sorum (2001) earned her multiple awards.

Sorum blurs the line between psychological and supernatural elements, exploring the haunting persistence of trauma—both personal and inherited—through themes of isolation, loss, and the burden of the past. At its core, the film examines the emotional scars left by violence, abandonment, and unresolved guilt, revealing their destructive toll on its characters.

It also explores the fragility of human connection, as Yong-hyun and Yeong seek solace from their pasts through their interactions, yet remain trapped by internal struggles they cannot confront or escape. Beyond literal ghosts, the past manifests as repressed memories and lingering pain, with the building's dark history mirroring their tormented minds, where buried anguish resurfaces with destructive consequences.

== Cast ==
- Kim Myung-min as Yong-hyun
- Jang Jin-young as Sun-yeong
- Gi Ju-bong as writer Lee
- Jo An as Eun-soo
- Kim Gi-cheon
- Lee Han-wi
- Lee Kwang-gi
- Park Yeong-hoon
- Kim Joo-ryoung
- Kwon Tae-won
- Choi Woong as Writer Lee's son

== Awards ==
2001 Sitges Film Festival

- Best Actress: Jang Jin-young

2001 Busan Film Critics Awards

- Best New Actor: Kim Myung-min
- Best New Actress: Jang Jin-young

2001 Blue Dragon Film Awards

- Best Actress: Jang Jin-young

2001 Director's Cut Awards

- Best Actress: Jang Jin-young
- Best New Actor: Kim Myung-min

2002 Fantasporto International Fantasy Film

- Best Actress: Jang Jin-young
- Best Director: Yoon Jong-chan
- Special Jury Award: Yoon Jong-chan

2002 Málaga International Week of Fantastic Cinema

- Best Actress: Jang Jin-young

== Reception ==
Dread Central wrote, "Sorum is definitely a slow burn", but called the film's "subtle horror" effective.
