= Once Upon a Time in a Battlefield =

- Theatrical release poster
- Hangul: 황산벌
- Hanja: 黃山伐
- RR: Hwangsanbeol
- MR: Hwangsanbŏl
- Directed by: Lee Joon-ik
- Written by: Choi Seok-hwan; Jo Cheol-hyeon
- Produced by: Oh Seung-hyeon; Jo Cheol-hyeon; Lee Joon-ik
- Starring: Park Joong-hoon; Jung Jin-young; Lee Moon-sik; Ryu Seung-soo
- Cinematography: Ji Gil-woong
- Edited by: Kim Jae-beom
- Music by: Oh Seok-joon
- Production company: Cineworld
- Distributed by: Cineworld
- Release date: October 17, 2003
- Running time: 104 minutes
- Country: South Korea
- Language: Korean

Once Upon a Time in a Battlefield (Korean: 황산벌; RR: Hwangsanbeol) is a 2003 South Korean historical comedy film directed by Lee Joon-ik, centered around the Battle of Hwangsanbeol between Baekje and Silla in the 7th century. The film was the 8th most attended film of 2003 with 2,835,000 tickets sold nationwide. Its popularity spawned a sequel, titled Battlefield Heroes, which debuted in 2011, and takes place in the subsequent Silla-Tang invasion of Goguryeo.

== Plot ==
The movie starts out with a meeting between the rulers of Baekje, Silla, Tang China, and Goguryeo, during which Tang asserts its legitimacy and superiority over the Korean kingdoms and subsequently demands tribute. Silla, who needs Tang's assistance, agrees with Tang, while Goguryeo and Baekje refuse.

After the meeting breaks down, ill news arrives at the Baekje court as news arrives of a Tang-Silla army advancing, although the court is unsure whether the army is marching on Goguryeo or Baekje. Eventually, news arrives confirming the worst: the allied Tang-Silla army is heading for Baekje strategic key points, all but confirming that Baekje is the intended target.

As the court disintegrates into infighting and name-calling between the royalist faction and the disgruntled nobles, the Baekje king, Uija, calls for general Gyebaek, a loyal, able and honest general who accepts the responsibility of riding out to meet the 50,000 Silla troops, who outnumber his army 10 to 1. Before leaving to battle, Gyebaek, who realizes the odds and knows he will not be able to return alive, kills his family by his own hand, afraid of what may happen to them if they were to be captured.

The Silla and Baekje armies come to a standoff at Hwangsanbeol. The Silla commander, Kim Yu-sin, is hesitant to attack, even with the overwhelming numerical advantage he holds, having never been able to defeat Gyebaek in battle, and having heard from a spy about Gyebaek's mysterious plans for the battles, though none in the Silla camp can decipher what those plans are.

Kim Yu-sin launches a series of probing attacks as he races against the deadline allotted to him by the Tang general, Su Dingfang, by which he was to rendezvous with the Tang army with provisions and supplies for the Tang army, which Silla had agreed to provide. The attacks, which are an attempt to learn what Gyebaek's mysterious plans are and to lure the Baekje army into open battle, fail.

As Kim's subordinates become more and more agitated as the deadline comes near, Kim calms them, knowing that any frontal assault on the Baekje defenses would be a catastrophic failure. Instead, he invites Gyebaek to a game of janggi, during which he attempts to persuade Gyebaek of the futility of his situation. Gyebaek remains resolute, but during the game it is found that he has sewn shut his armor so that it cannot be taken off until he is dead, a directive that Gyebaek reveals he has given to his soldiers as well. It is revealed that this directive - to fight to the death - was the elusive plan that Kim Yu-sin had been trying to find out.

Now with knowledge of the state of Gyebaek's army, Kim orders his generals to send their sons, who are members of the Hwarang, on a suicide mission, riding alone to challenge Gyebaek to a duel, in an attempt to raise the morale of the Silla troops. As the first corpses of the youth of Silla are sent back, Kim orders more of the youth to be sent forward, retorting to a protesting officer who asks him if he is crazy that war is something only a crazy person would do.

Both sides prepare for what they feel will be the final battle. It is a wet and rainy day, and the Silla army fire balls of clay at the defenders with catapults, which weigh down the tiring Baekje troops and force them to take off their armor. As the armored Silla troops, high in morale, stream into the Baekje defenses, the tired and mostly unarmored Baekje troops cannot hold the defenses and are massacred. Gyebaek retreats into a keep with a handful of men, and ultimatedly goes out to face death at the hands of the Silla troops, although he lets an unnamed soldier, identified only as "Geoshigi(lit, 'You-know-what'), who expresses regret at leaving behind his family, escape. As Gyebaek falls after being hit by a volley of arrows, he recalls his family, who had in actuality wanted to live, and did not see him as a hero of the country, but only as a bad father and husband.

The movie ends with King Uija pondering the empty words of his sons, who want him to commit suicide as the last ruler of a fallen kingdom while refusing to commit suicide themselves. In the Tang-Silla camp, Tang show their desire to take the conquered territory for themselves and an enraged Kim Yu-sin declares that he will "one day kick the Tang out of this land." Meanwhile, "Geoshigi" is reunited with his mother, who is working in the fields for the harvest.

== Cast ==
=== Silla ===
- Jung Jin-young as Kim Yu-sin
- Ahn Nae-sang as Kim Beop-min
- Shin Jung-geun as Kim Heum-sun
- Chen Ki-kwang as Kim Pum-il
- Ryu Seung-soo as Kim In-mun
- Lee Ho-sung as Kim Chun-chu, King of Silla

=== Baekje ===
- Oh Ji-myeong as King Uija
- Park Joong-hoon as Gyebaek
- Kim Sun-a as Gyebaek's wife
- Lee Moon-sik as "Geoshigi"

=== Others ===
- Gao Muchun as Su Dingfang
- Lee Won-jong as Yeon Gaesomun
