= Yoon Jong-chan =

South Korean film director (born 1963)

- Born: 1963 (age 62–63); South Korea
- Education: Hanyang University; Syracuse University
- Occupations: Film director, screenwriter
- Years active: 1993-present

Korean name
- Hangul: 윤종찬
- RR: Yun Jongchan
- MR: Yun Chongch'an

Yoon Jong-chan (Korean: 윤종찬; born 1963) is a South Korean film director. He directed Sorum (2001), Blue Swallow (2005), I Am Happy (2009) and My Paparotti (2013).

== Career ==
Yoon Jong-chan majored in film at Hanyang University, and upon graduation he joined the crew of Kim Young-bin's No Emergency Exit (1993) as an assistant director. In 1995, Yoon went to the United States to attend Syracuse University, where he earned his MFA in Film Directing. While at Syracuse, he directed three short films about memory and fate, Playback (1996), Memento (1997), and Views (1999), which won numerous awards at film festivals both in Korea and abroad.

Yoon returned to Korea in 2001, and first taught in the film department of Hoseo University. He then made his feature directorial debut with Sorum (meaning "gooseflesh" in Korean). About damaged people living in a dilapidated apartment complex (particularly a taxi driver who has an affair with a battered housewife, played by Kim Myung-min and Jang Jin-young), local critics praised Sorum as a stylish, atmospheric, deeply challenging, and intelligently written horror film. Yoon won Best New Director at the Busan Film Critics Awards and the Baeksang Arts Awards, while Sorum won three awards at Fantasporto, including Best Director for Yoon, Best Actress for Jang, and the Special Jury Prize.

For his next film, biopic Blue Swallow (2005), Yoon again cast Jang in the leading role as Park Kyung-won, a real-life Korean pioneering female aviator who lived in the 1920s and 1930s (the film is named after Park's beloved biplane). Yoon proved that he could handle an ambitious, big-budget project, and the ₩9.5 billion (US$6+ million) blockbuster had overseas locations in Japan, El Mirage (California), and Changchun (China), included 1,100 CGI-enhanced aerial scenes, and employed 1,000 extras. But the film became mired in controversy when certain conservative internet reporters accused Park of being a pro-Japanese collaborator and alleged that the film had whitewashed its protagonist, to which Yoon responded, "I don't have any intention to embellish her or depict her as a independence fighter in my film. I just wanted to show a tragedy of a woman who had to choose her dream over her country." Despite excellent reviews and Park's biographer pointing out factual errors in these accusations, it resulted in the under-performance of Blue Swallow at the box office.

Yoon made his first foray into digital filmmaking with I Am Happy, adapted from the novel Mr. Cho Man-deuk by Lee Cheong-jun. He shot the ironically titled romance film on HD for six weeks, and cast Hyun Bin and Lee Bo-young as a megalomania-afflicted patient and his nurse who find more comfort inside a psychiatric ward than their reality outside. I Am Happy was the closing film of the 13th Busan International Film Festival in 2008 and was released in theaters in 2009.

In 2013, Han Suk-kyu and Lee Je-hoon starred in Yoon's fourth film My Paparotti, about a troubled teen and his temperamental music teacher, who missed his chance at fame as an opera singer in his youth and sees himself in his new student. It won the Grand Prize at the 27th Fukuoka Asian Film Festival.

== Personal life ==
Yoon's wife died at the Sampoong Department Store collapse in 1995.

== Filmography ==
- No Emergency Exit (1993) - assistant director
- Playback (short film, 1996) - director
- Memento (short film, 1997) - director, producer, cinematographer
- Views (short film, 1999) - director, producer, cinematographer
- Sorum (2001) - director, screenwriter
- Blue Swallow (2005) - director, screenwriter
- I Am Happy (2009) - director, screenwriter, actor
- My Paparotti (2013) - director

== Awards ==
- 2001 2nd Busan Film Critics Awards: Best New Director (Sorum)
- 2002 22nd Fantasporto: Best Director (Sorum)
- 2002 38th Baeksang Arts Awards: Best New Director (Sorum)
