= Over the Rainbow (film) =

- Theatrical release poster
- Hangul: 오버 더 레인보우
- RR: Obeo deo reinbou
- MR: Obŏ tŏ reinbou
- Directed by: Ahn Jin-woo
- Written by: Ahn Jin-woo; Jang Hyeok-rin; Jo Myeong-joo
- Starring: Lee Jung-jae; Jang Jin-young
- Cinematography: Kim Young-chul
- Edited by: Park Gok-ji
- Music by: Park Ho-joon
- Distributed by: A-Line
- Release date: May 17, 2002
- Running time: 109 minutes
- Country: South Korea
- Language: Korean
- Box office: $2.5 million

Over the Rainbow (Korean: 오버 더 레인보우; RR: Obeo deo reinbou) is a 2002 South Korean romantic drama film starring Lee Jung-jae and Jang Jin-young.

== Plot ==
Weather presenter Jin-su is involved in a car accident, and though physically unhurt, he is left with a case of selective amnesia. Haunted by the memory of a woman he can not quite recall, he sets out to find her identity by revisiting some of his old college friends. The person giving him the most help is Jeong-hee, but as she helps him piece together his broken memories they start to develop feelings for one another, and Jin-su realizes that perhaps his forgotten past is not worth chasing after all.

== Cast ==
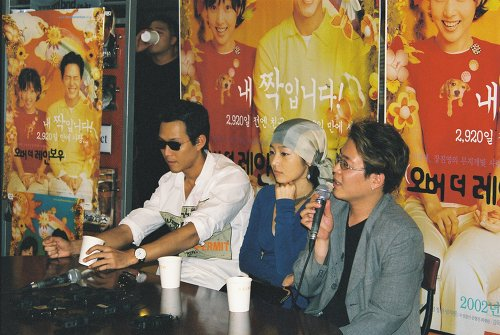
(From L to R): Actors Lee Jung-jae and Jang Jin-young, director Ahn Jin-woo

- Lee Jung-jae as Lee Jin-su
- Jang Jin-young as Kang Jeong-hee
- Jung Chan as Choi Sang-in
- Uhm Ji-won as Kim Eun-song
- Gong Hyung-jin as Kim Young-min
- Kim Seo-hyung
- Choi Jae-won
