= Kwon Ki-ok =

First female Korean aviator (1901–1988)

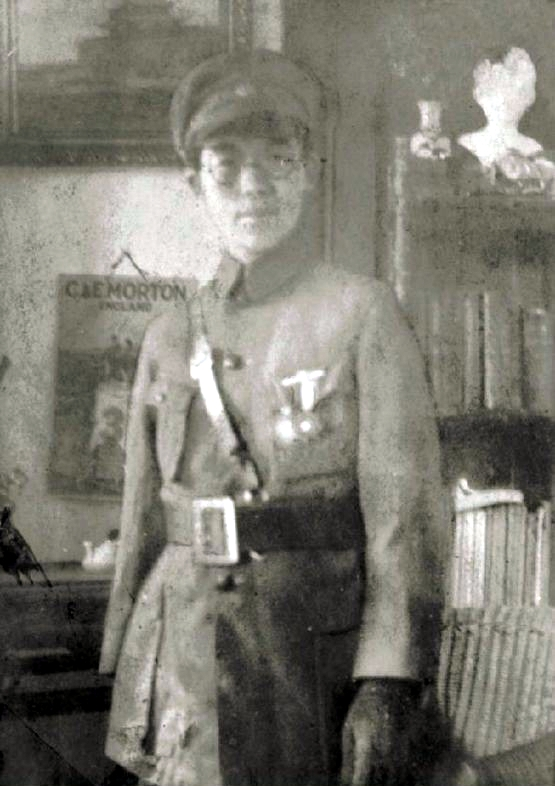
- Kwon in China, 1935
- Born: 11 January 1901; Pyongyang, South Pyongan Province, Korean Empire
- Died: 19 April 1988 (aged 87); Seoul, South Korea
- Occupation: Aviator
- Spouse: Lee Sang-jeong

Korean name
- Hangul: 권기옥
- Hanja: 權基玉
- RR: Gwon Giok
- MR: Kwŏn Kiok

Kwon Ki-ok (Korean: 권기옥; 11 January 1901 – 19 April 1988) was a Korean aviator. She is the first Korean female pilot and one of the first female pilots to fly in China. Her name in Chinese is Quan Jiyu (Chinese: 權基玉; pinyin: Quán Jīyù). Kwon went into exile in China during the Japanese occupation of Korea and became a lieutenant colonel in the Republic of China's air force. She returned home after the liberation of Korea and became a founding member of the Republic of Korea Air Force.

== Biography ==
Kwon was born in Sangsugu Village, (Note: 상수구리; 上水口里) Pyongyang, South Pyongan Province, Korean Empire to Gwon Don-gak (Note: 권돈각; 權敦珏) and Jang Mun-myeong. (Note: 장문명; 張文明) She was the second of five children (four daughters and one son). She was of the Andong Kwon clan.

Kwon attended Pyongyang's Sunghyeon Elementary School (Note: 숭현보통학교) from 1913 to 1918. There, she was inspired to learn to fly after seeing a 1917 aerobatics demonstration by American stunt pilot Art Smith.

=== Career ===
The following year, she participated in the March First Movement, for which she spent three weeks in jail; after her release, she assisted with fundraising activities for the Korean Patriotic Women's Association, (Note: 대한애국부인회; 大韓愛國婦人會; Taehan aeguk puinhoe) as a result of which she was arrested and imprisoned for six months. Upon her release, she went into exile in China. In China, she enrolled in the Hongdao Women's School (Note: Chinese: 弘道女中; Pinyin: Hóngdào Nǚ Zhòng; Korean: 홍도여중) in Hangzhou, operated by American missionary Ellen Peterson, in order to learn Chinese and English. She completed a four-year course of study in just two years.

In 1923, at the recommendation of the Provisional Government of the Republic of Korea in Shanghai, she entered the Republic of China Air Force School in Yunnan, graduating in 1925. She was the only woman in the first graduating class. After graduation, she was stationed in Beijing, and then relocated to Nanjing in 1927. By 1940, she had achieved the rank of lieutenant colonel.

In 1945, with the end of World War II and the restoration of Korean independence, Kwon returned to Korea, where she was instrumental in the founding of the Republic of Korea Air Force. During the Korean War, she served as a member of South Korea's Ministry of National Defense. Following the war, she retired to private life, serving as the vice-president of the Korea-China Cultural Association from 1966 until 1975. She received various recognitions for her service to the country, including a 1968 presidential commendation and the 1977 Order of Merit for National Foundation. She died on 19 April 1988 and was buried in the National Cemetery in Dongjak District, Seoul.

== Legacy ==
In August 2003, Kwon was selected as "Independence Activist of the Month" by the Ministry of Patriots' and Veterans' Affairs. At the time of the release of the 2005 South Korean film Blue Swallow, Park Kyung-won was believed to have been Korea's first female aviator; as knowledge that Kwon actually preceded her became more widespread, the distributor was forced to change their marketing campaign.

== See also ==
- An Chang-nam
- Feng Ru
