= Lee Kwang-hoon =

South Korean filmmaker

- Born: 1959 (age 66–67)
- Occupation: Filmmaker
- Known for: Ghost in Love

Korean name
- Hangul: 이광훈
- RR: I Gwanghun
- MR: I Kwanghun

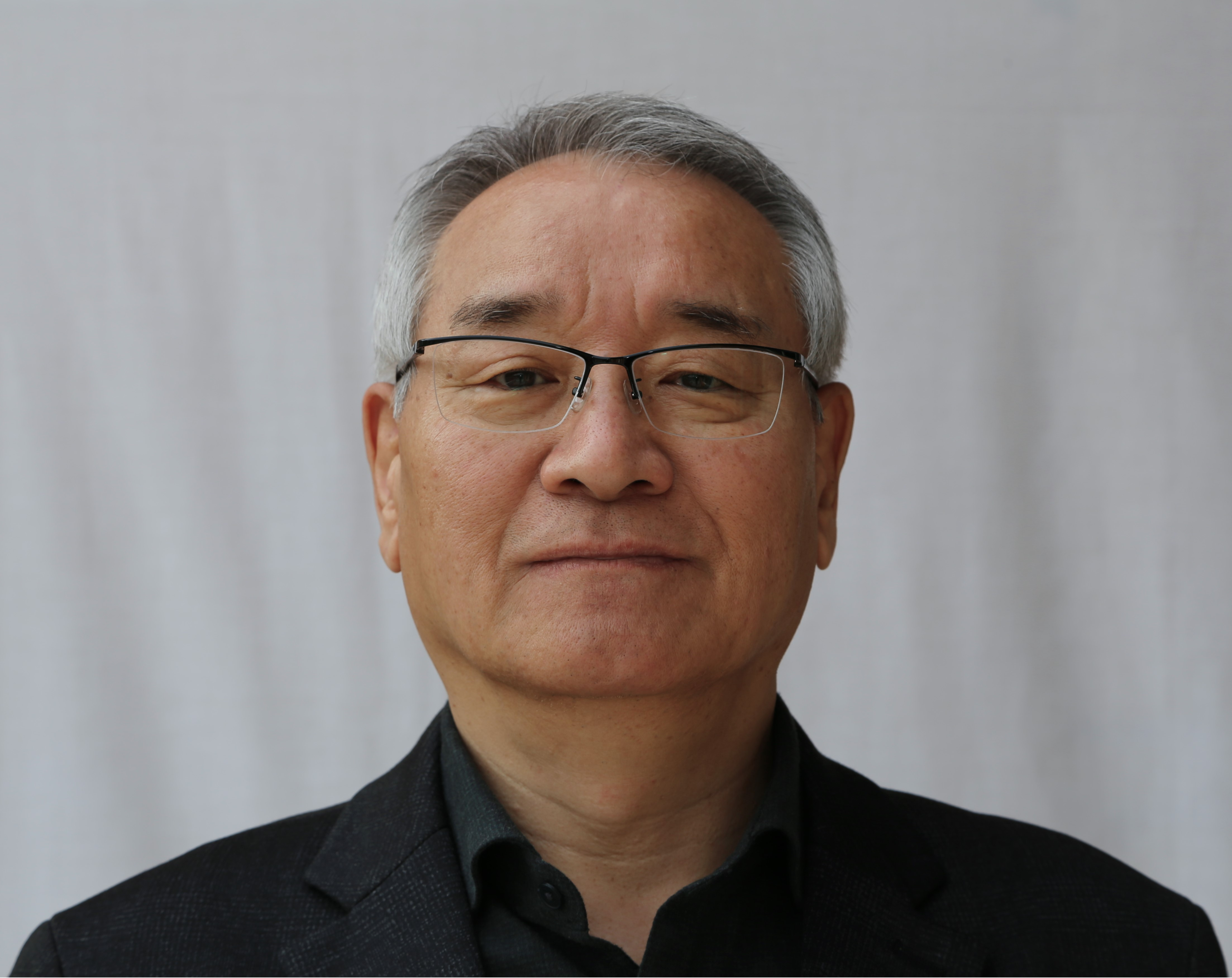

Lee Kwang-hoon (Korean: 이광훈; born 1959) is a South Korean filmmaker who has directed four feature-length films.

== Education and career ==
Lee was born in South Korea in 1959, and studied at Sogang University for his Bachelor of Arts and in Ohio State University to get his Master of Arts. He was the assistant director for Eyes of Dawn and also appeared as an extra. His first movie Doctor Bong was the biggest box office success in Korea in 1995.

Lee's 1999 film Ghost in Love (Jaguimo) was one of the leading films in the "new wave" of Korean cinema around the turn of the millennium designed to produce blockbusters to rival Hollywood.

In 2008 Lee was involved in controversy when he accused Kim Tae-kyun, the director of Crossing, of plagiarism.

== Filmography ==
- Dr. Bong (1995)
- Repechage (1997)
- Model (1997, TV series)
- Ghost in Love (1999)
- The Legend of the Evil Lake (2003)
