= Between Love and Hate (2006 film) =

- Hangul: 연애, 그 참을 수 없는 가벼움
- Hanja: 戀愛, 그 참을 수 없는 가벼움
- RR: Yeonae, geu chameul su eomneun gabyeoum
- MR: Yŏnae, kŭ ch'amŭl su ŏmnŭn kabyŏum
- Directed by: Kim Hae-gon
- Written by: Kim Hae-gon
- Produced by: Kim Jeong-su; Jo Jin-man
- Starring: Kim Seung-woo; Jang Jin-young
- Cinematography: Choi Gi-youl
- Edited by: Kyung Min-ho
- Music by: Lee Han-na
- Distributed by: Cinema Service
- Release date: September 7, 2006
- Running time: 125 minutes
- Country: South Korea
- Language: Korean
- Budget: US$3.5 million
- Box office: US$3,464,124

Between Love and Hate (also known as The Unbearable Lightness of Dating) is a 2006 South Korean film starring Kim Seung-woo and Jang Jin-young, and is the directorial debut of screenwriter Kim Hae-gon. Jang's performance won her Best Actress at the 2006 Korean Film Awards. This would be Jang Jin-young's final film before her death almost 3 years later.

== Plot ==
Young-woon works in his mother's restaurant, and is more interested in having a good time with his friends than settling down with his fiancée. He allows himself to be seduced by bargirl Yeon-ah, and the two embark on a tumultuous love-hate relationship. But when Young-woon's mother finds out about the affair and pushes him into marrying his fiancée, he is forced into choosing between the two women.

== Cast ==
- Kim Seung-woo as Young-woon
- Jang Jin-young as Yeon-ah
- Sunwoo Yong-nyeo as Young-woon's mother
- Kim Sang-ho as Director Jeon
- Nam Sung-jin as Joon-hee
- Jung Soo-hyung as Min-gu
- Oh Jung-se as Tae-gu
- Oh Dal-su as Hak-yi
- Tak Jae-hoon as Joon-yong
