= Hi! Dharma! =

2001 South Korean comedy film by Park Chul-kwan

- Theatrical release poster
- Hangul: 달마야 놀자
- Hanja: 達磨야 놀자
- RR: Dalmaya nolja
- MR: Talmaya nolja
- Directed by: Park Chul-kwan
- Written by: Park Gyu-tae
- Produced by: Lee Joon-ik
- Starring: Park Shin-yang; Jung Jin-young
- Cinematography: Park Hee-ju
- Edited by: Kim Sang-bum; Kim Jae-bum
- Music by: Park Jin-seok; Shin Ho-seop
- Production company: KM Culture
- Distributed by: Cineworld
- Release date: November 7, 2001
- Running time: 95 minutes
- Country: South Korea
- Language: Korean
- Box office: US$20.4 million

Hi! Dharma! (Korean: 달마야 놀자; RR: Dalmaya nolja; lit. 'Hey Dharma Let's Play') is a 2001 South Korean comedy film about gangsters who hide out in a monastery. With 3,746,000 admissions, it was the fifth highest-grossing Korean film of 2001.

A sequel titled Hi! Dharma 2: Showdown in Seoul was released in 2004.

== Plot ==
Five gangsters escape in a van after a bloody confrontation with the rival Chunno gang. They detect a snitch within their ranks and cannot leave the country because the police will be looking for them. So they go to the mountains and hide in a Buddhist monastery.

But the monks there don't want the gangsters to stay. So the monks propose that if the gangsters can win three of five contests, they can stay, but if they lose, they must leave immediately. The gangsters win enough contests, the last being suggested by the eldest monk: a challenge to fill up a broken water pot without plugging up the hole. The gangsters come up with the idea of putting the pot into the river. They are allowed to stay for a week. But the younger monks can't stand the gangsters and attempt to persuade them to leave.

Meanwhile, the boss among the gangsters realizes who betrayed them but contacts the snitch anyway, giving away his location. Former members who defected to the Chunno gang show up near the monastery, dig a shallow mass grave and throw the gangsters they betrayed into it. But the monks come to the rescue of their unwanted guests.

Back at the monastery, both the monks and the gangsters are saddened to learn of the death of the eldest monk. After the funeral, the gangsters leave. Months later, they make donations to the monastery in gratitude for their hospitality.

== Cast ==
- Park Shin-yang ... Jae-gyu
- Jung Jin-young ... Monk Jeong-myeong
- Park Sang-myun ... Bul-kom
- Kang Sung-jin ... Nal-chi
- Kim Soo-ro ... Wang Ku-ra
- Hong Kyoung-in ... Rookie
- Kim In-mun ... Master
- Kim Young-moon
- Lee Dae-yeon ... Chang-guen
- Lee Mu-hyeon ... Dae-ho
- Lee Moon-sik .. monk Dae-bong
- Lee Won-jong ... monk Hyeon-gak
- Im Hyun-kyung ... Yeun-hwa
- Ryu Seung-soo ... Monk Myung-chun
- Kwon Oh-min ... Boy monk

== Trivia ==
The male actors who played the monks and the only actress in the movie (Im Hyun-kyung), who played the nun Yeon-hwa, actually shaved their heads for the movie.
