= Hi! Dharma 2: Showdown in Seoul =

- Theatrical poster
- Directed by: Yook Sang-hyo
- Written by: Choi Seok-hwan; Yook Sang-hyo
- Produced by: Cho Chul-hyun; Jung Seung-hye
- Starring: Shin Hyun-joon; Jung Jin-young
- Cinematography: Park Hee-ju
- Edited by: Kim Sang-bum; Kim Jae-bum
- Music by: Bang Jun-seok; Jang Min-seung
- Production companies: Cineworld; Tiger Pictures; KM Culture
- Distributed by: Cinema Service
- Release date: July 9, 2004
- Running time: 101 minutes
- Country: South Korea
- Language: Korean

Hi! Dharma 2: Showdown in Seoul (Korean: 달마야, 서울 가자; RR: Dalmaya, seoul gaja; lit. 'Hey Dharma, Let's Go to Seoul') is a 2004 South Korean gangster comedy film. It is the sequel to Hi! Dharma! (2001).

== Plot ==
To deliver a package for their recently departed abbot Jeong-myeong, Hyeon-gak and Dae-bong travel to Musim Temple in Seoul in their first contact with civilization in years. But they find the temple in financial trouble and at risk of being taken over by Beom-shik and his gang, who plan to build an apartment complex on the land. The monk trio feel a duty to stay in the city to protect the temple and prepare for another showdown.

== Cast ==
- Shin Hyun-joon as Beom-shik
- Jung Jin-young as Monk Jeong-myeong
- Lee Won-jong as monk Hyeon-gak
- Lee Moon-sik as monk Dae-bong
- Yang Jin-woo as monk Mu-jin
- Yoo Hae-jin as Yong-dae
- Kim Seok-hwan as Sang-geun
- Lee Hyung-chul as Gu-man
- Kim Ji-young as Elder bosal
- Jung Han-yong as Company president Park
- Han Hye-jin as Mi-seon
- Park Gun-woo as Boy monk
- Choi Min-kum as Kimbap ajumma
- Park Gyeong-ok as Boutique designer Jung
- Lee Ye-won as Jae-gyu's wife
- Park Shin-yang as Jae-gyu (cameo)
