= An Chang-nam =

First Korean to fly in Korea (1901–1930)

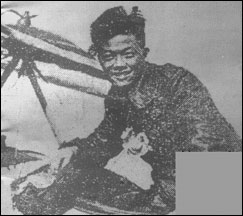
- An in the 1920s

Korean name
- Hangul: 안창남
- Hanja: 安昌男
- RR: An Changnam
- MR: An Ch'angnam

An Chang-nam (19 March 1901 – 2 April 1930) was the first Korean aviator to fly a plane within the Korean peninsula.

== Early life ==
Born on 19 March 1901 and raised in Seoul, he is believed to have been inspired to learn to fly after having seen an aerobatics demonstration by American pilot Art Smith in 1916 or 1917. However, his beginnings was quite unorthodox: after stealing his stepmother's money, he ran away from home. Using the stolen money, he traveled to Japan at which he attended a driving school and graduated successfully.

== Career ==
In 1920, he graduated from Japan's Okuri Aviation School in Susaki (present-day Kōtō, Tokyo). He passed his examinations to obtain a basic pilot's permit the following year.

An borrowed a single-engine plane from the Okuri Aviation School and on December 10, 1922, flew the plane over the Yeouido island. Though it was not the first public plane flight in Korea, roughly 50,000 people visited Yeouido island to watch the first Korean fly a plane in his motherland. The flight was relatively simple, with An simply circling over the crowd. Following the display, he additionally flew in Seoul and made flight to Incheon. However, due to bad weather, plans to fly to more cities was cancelled. On his homecoming flight, he landed at the same airport he took off in. Donga Ilbo, a major Korean newspaper at the time, sponsored An's flights and documented his aviations and achievements. He returned to Japan after his flights over Korea in late December of the same year.

In 1925, An was forced to evacuate to China after facing oppression in Japan. Tokyo earthquake of 1923 and the subsequent anti-Korean riots may have played a major factor in his decision. After few years of residing at China (in which Korean nationalism prospered), he began to advocate for Korean independence movement. Despite his newfound activities, An's involvement in aviation did not end here. He established a flying school in response to an offer from Chinese warlords. He died while on a flight that crashed in April 1930. Although the cause of the accident was not supported by evidence, some historians speculate that foul play by Japanese officials may have been involved.

He was posthumously awarded South Korea's Order of Merit for National Foundation in 2003.

== See also ==
- Kwon Ki-ok
- Seo Wal-bo
