= The Legend of the Evil Lake =

- Theatrical poster
- Hangul: 천년호
- Hanja: 千年湖
- RR: Cheonnyeonho
- MR: Ch'ŏnnyŏnho
- Directed by: Lee Kwang-hoon
- Written by: Hong Joo-ri
- Produced by: Kim Hyeong-joon
- Starring: Jung Joon-ho; Kim Hye-ri; Kim Hyo-jin; Lee Han-gal; Kang Shin-il; Park Dong-bin
- Cinematography: Lü Yue; Kim Yoon-su
- Edited by: Lee Hyun-mi
- Music by: Lee Dong-joon
- Distributed by: Cinema Service
- Release date: 28 November 2003 (South Korea)
- Running time: 92 minutes
- Country: South Korea
- Language: Korean
- Budget: $5.7 million

The Legend of the Evil Lake (Korean: 천년호; RR: Cheonnyeonho) is a 2003 South Korean fantasy/horror film directed by Lee Kwang-hoon. It is a remake of Shin Sang-ok's 1969 film A Thousand Year-Old Fox. The film was not particularly well received and was seen by 101,478 people at Seoul theaters.

== Plot ==
The film opens with the massacre of a primitive tribe by Silla's first king, Park Hyeokgeose and his technologically advanced army. The Auta tribal chief in death throes vows vengeance against Silla, and their blood and resentment fill the place where the Sacred Tree was standing, and turns into a lake. To seal off the Auta tribe's force of sorcery, he drives his Holy Sword deep into the Sacred Tree.

The narrative resumes nearly one millennium later, circa A.D. 896, as Silla is showing symptoms of strain and the court is beset by constant rebellions. Queen Jinseong (Kim Hye-ri), troubled by the threats to the throne, leans on General Biharang (Jung Joon-ho) against the counsels of her ministers. Biharang strives to save the country, but he is also weary of the endless battles. He, however, spurns the Queen's romantic attentions in favor of his betrothed Jaunbi (Kim Hyo-jin), the daughter of an executed rebel, with whom he wishes to settle down and lead a quiet, peaceful life.

While Biharang has left for the country's border to quench the rebels, Jaunbi is chased by assassins who were ordered by the Minister Mun-su to kill her. In panic, Jaunbi removes the Sword from the Sacred Tree thus releasing the soul of Auta tribal chief. But the assassins easily overpower her and try to rape her. Jaunbi somehow slips away from their hands and reaches at the edge of the Evil Lake. She throws herself into the Lake before leaving her necklace there as a sign for Biharang that she is dead.

The spirit of the Auta tribe who are resentful of the Silla kingdom use Jaunbi's body to take their revenge on Silla. She is transformed into a flying phantasm with superpowers and seeks to lay waste to Seorabeol, capital of Silla. When the moon soaked with a thousand years' resentment shines its rays upon the dark earth, an age-old revenge begins, and love turns to tragedy.

== Cast ==
- Jung Joon-ho as General Biharang
- Kim Hyo-jin as Jaunbi
- Kim Hye-ri as Queen Jinseong
- Choi Won-seok as Master Myo-hyeon
- Lee Han-gal as Talwi
- Ho San as General Bang Oh-rang
- Kang Shin-il as Minister Mun-su
- Park Dong-bin as Auta
- Jung Joo-hwan
- Jang Hyo-sun
- Kwon Yung-min
- Kang Hyung-joon
