= Typhoon (2005 film) =

- Theatrical release poster
- Hangul: 태풍
- Hanja: 颱風
- RR: Taepung
- MR: T'aep'ung
- Directed by: Kwak Kyung-taek
- Written by: Kwak Kyung-taek; An Yeong-su
- Produced by: Yang Jung-gyeong; Park Seong-geun
- Starring: Jang Dong-gun; Lee Jung-jae; Lee Mi-yeon
- Cinematography: Hong Kyung-pyo
- Edited by: Park Kwang-il
- Music by: Kim Hyung-suk
- Distributed by: CJ Entertainment
- Release date: December 14, 2005
- Running time: 124 minutes
- Country: South Korea
- Languages: Korean; English; Thai; Russian
- Budget: ₩17 billion
- Box office: US$26.2 million

Typhoon (Korean: 태풍; RR: Taepung) is a 2005 South Korean action film directed by Kwak Kyung-taek and starring Jang Dong-gun, Lee Jung-jae, and Lee Mi-yeon. Jang plays a vengeful refugee-turned-pirate who plans a massive attack on North and South Korea. A top South Korean naval officer (Lee Jung-jae) is assigned the task to stop his plans and execute him.

Typhoon was the highest budgeted South Korean film at the time, with a budget of over 15 million dollars, or about 17 billion won. The film was shot in three countries: South Korea, Thailand, Russia.

== Plot ==
An American freighter ship carrying sensitive cargo en route to Taiwan is hijacked by North Korean pirates led by Sin (Jang Dong-gun), a terrorist set on destroying the Korean Peninsula. The sensitive cargo is weapons technology for a military satellite, secretly made by the U.S. in reaction to strengthening Chinese/Russian relations. Having stolen the technology, Sin attempts to attain highly radioactive waste from Russia through the black market. His plan is to detonate a fleet of helium balloons loaded with radioactive waste over the Korean Peninsula.

To investigate the hijacking, the South Korean government sends Sejong (Lee Jung-jae), a South Korean Naval Intelligence Service officer, to meet a black market contact in Thailand who knows about the hijacking. Sejong's meeting with the contact goes sour but he learns about Sin and tracks his location in the Russian district of Busan, South Korea. In Busan, Sin meets with Russian mob members who take him to a political seminar, where he stabs Park Wan-sik, the South Korean counsel general in New York, in the men's bathroom. In a flashback that Park was partly responsible for the death and murder of Sin's family.

Sin's family were North Korean refugees who requested embassy in South Korea. At the time, the South Korean government was trying to strengthen relations with China and they were forced to reject the family's request. Park Wansik was sent by the South Korean government in order to make arrangements for the family's disposal. The family ended up being killed by North Korean authorities. The only survivors were Sin and his older sister (Lee Mi-yeon), who managed to escape but were stranded in the wilderness between the borders of North Korea and China. After enduring hardship, starvation, and rape, they managed to cross over to a train station in China where the two were tragically separated. Sin goes down his own path and lives the life of a criminal and a modern-day pirate in South East Asia, where his bitterness and hatred grows, and he plots revenge against his betrayers. His anger expands and he decides to destroy the entire Korean Peninsula.

Sin is embittered towards the North Korean government for the murder of his family and at the South Korean government for abandoning them. He decides to hatch a plan to unleash uranium onto the clouds of a typhoon so that radioactive rain will shower onto the Korean Peninsula, effectively destroying it. He sets out with his group of South East Asian pirates, but he encounters Sejong. In an attempt to lure Sin into their hands, Sejong sets up an appointment for Sin to reunite with his sister. Sin, who had assumed his sister to be dead, believes it to be a farce to lure him out, but he goes anyway. Sin takes the bait and enters the meeting, but Sejong soon discovers that Sin and his sister are more prepared than he had thought. Sin has a sniper set up, who effectively takes out part of Sejong's elite team, though Sin's sister is caught in the crossfire and suffers a bullet wound.

After escaping, Sin sets out to execute his plans of mass destruction. He embarks on a freight carrier that he names "Typhoon" that is filled with balloons carrying canisters filled with uranium. Meanwhile, in a last-ditch effort to save the Korean Peninsula, Sejong gathers a South Korean UDT/SEAL team, and helicopters out to sea. He makes a point of picking single men, stating that death is likely. They fly through the impending typhoon to the freight carrier, encountering Sin and his pirates. There is a bloody skirmish and both sides suffer casualties.

Sin is in the lower cabins through most of the fighting, spending time with his sister during her last breaths. The bullet wound is too much and she is about to die. They agree to meet again in the afterlife. Dazed, Sin heads out after she dies and he begins to release his uranium balloons. Having to manually open the hatch to release them, he is able to crank it open a few feet, allowing a few balloons to escape. Before he can activate the balloons with his remote control, Sejong makes his appearance. He is the last man standing, except for Sin, and all the rest of the Special Forces soldiers and Pirates are dead. Sin and Sejong struggle in a fight to the death, which culminates in Sin's death.

In his last sentiments, Sejong sends a letter to his mother. He believes that in the end, Sin never intended to destroy Korea and that he was just a desperate man who was a product of a tragedy. He is regretful of Sin's death, and says he wouldn't have minded befriending Sin in another life. Sin then carries his sister onto a boat to cross the river of the dead, and they cross over into the afterlife together.

== Cast ==
- Jang Dong-gun as Sin, a North Korean pirate and terrorist and Choi Myeong-ju's younger brother. He is the leader of a group of pirates and terrorists, whose main mission is to destroy the Korean Peninsula for revenge against the North Korean government because of the death of their family.
- Lee Jung-jae as Sejong, a South Korean intelligence officer and the main foe of Sin, whose main mission is to stop Sin and his group of North Korean pirates from committing a terrorist attack against North Korea and South Korea.
- Lee Mi-yeon as Choi Myeong-ju, Sin's older sister and one of the two only survivors (along her younger brother Sin) of the massacre by the North Korean government against their family.
- David Lee McInnis as Somchai
- Kim Kap-soo as NIS director
- Chattapong Pantana-Angkul as Toto
