= Singles (2003 film) =

2003 South Korean romantic comedy film

- Hangul: 싱글즈
- RR: Singgeuljeu
- MR: Singgŭljŭ
- Directed by: Kwon Chil-in
- Written by: Noh Hye-yeong; Seong Gi-yeong; Park Heon-su
- Based on: Christmas at Twenty-nine by Kamato Toshio
- Produced by: Cha Seung-jae; Noh Jong-yeon; Im Choong-ryul; Yun Sang-oh
- Starring: Jang Jin-young; Uhm Jung-hwa; Lee Beom-soo; Kim Joo-hyuk
- Cinematography: Kim Jae-ho; Jang Seong-baek
- Edited by: Shin Min-kyung
- Music by: Kim Jun-seok
- Distributed by: Chungeorahm
- Release date: July 11, 2003
- Running time: 110 minutes
- Country: South Korea
- Language: Korean

Singles (Korean: 싱글즈) is a 2003 South Korean romantic comedy film starring Jang Jin-young, Uhm Jung-hwa, Lee Beom-soo, and Kim Joo-hyuk. It is based on the novel Christmas at Twenty-nine by Japanese writer Kamato Toshio. The film was one of the highest grossing Korean films of all time earning 2,203,164 admissions nationwide.

Jang won Best Actress at the 2003 Blue Dragon Film Awards for her performance.

== Plot ==
Na-nan, soon to turn 30, is at a crossroads in her life. She has been dumped by her boyfriend, then gets demoted at work from designer to restaurant manager. For support she relies on her best friend, promiscuous party girl Dong-mi, who shares an apartment with the shy and studious Jeong-joon. Eventually Na-nan attracts the attention of Su-heon, and the two start dating. But when she learns that Su-heon is being transferred to the United States, she must choose between making a go of her career as a restaurateur, or starting a new life overseas.

== Cast ==
- Jang Jin-young as Na-nan
- Uhm Jung-hwa as Dong-mi
- Lee Beom-soo as Jeong-joon
- Kim Joo-hyuk as Su-heon
- Oh Ji-hye
- Song Jae-ho
- Lee Hwi-jae
- Kim Kwang-il
- Han Ji-hye as Ji-hye
- Jo Hee-bong
