= Scent of Love =

- Theatrical release poster
- Hangul: 국화꽃 향기
- Hanja: 菊花꽃 香氣
- RR: Gukhwakkot hyanggi
- MR: Kukhwakkot hyanggi
- Directed by: Lee Jeong-wook
- Written by: Kim Hui-jae; Lee Jeong-wook
- Produced by: Jeong Tae-won
- Starring: Jang Jin-young; Park Hae-il
- Cinematography: Lee Hu-gon
- Edited by: Park Gok-ji
- Music by: Moon Dae-hyeon
- Production company: Taewon Entertainment
- Distributed by: Cinema Service
- Release date: February 28, 2003
- Running time: 109 minutes
- Country: South Korea
- Language: Korean

Scent of Love (Korean: 국화꽃 향기; lit. 'Scent of Chrysanthemums') is a 2003 South Korean romantic drama film, and the directorial debut of Lee Jeong-wook. The film is based on a novel of the same name by Kim Ha-in, starring Jang Jin-young and Park Hae-il. Like her character, Jang Jin-young battled stomach cancer and died in 2009. The film was screened at the Cannes Film Festival on May 16, 2003.

== Plot ==
University student Seo In-ha meets a young woman on the subway and instantly falls in love. After joining a local book club, he is pleasantly surprised to find that the woman, Mun Hee-jae, is also a member. Although he makes a poor first impression, In-ha and Hee-jae eventually become friends, though he is left disappointed when she later rejects him, as she is more interested in another student, Kang Seong-ho.

Several years pass, with In-ha and Hee-jae going their separate ways. While Hee-jae and Seong-ho prepare to get married, In-ha, now a producer at a local radio station, still pines after his first love. When Hee-jae survives a car crash that kills her fiancé and parents, In-ha keeps a respectful distance. After a while he resumes his pursuit of her by reading out letters on his radio show, and finally winning her heart, the couple get married.

However, their happiness is short-lived, as Hee-jae becomes pregnant only to discover that she has stomach cancer, and must choose between her own life and the life of her unborn child.

== Cast ==
- Jang Jin-young as Mun Hee-jae
- Park Hae-il as Seo In-ha
- Song Seon-mi as Choi Jeong-rae
- Kim Yu-seok as Kang Seong-ho
- Ahn Nae-sang as Mr. Park
- Byun Hee-bong as Bookstore owner
- Kim Hae-sook as In-ha's mother
- Lee Sun-kyun as Doctor Shin
- Kim Young-jae as Roots of Writing member
