= Jang Jin-young =

South Korean actress (1972–2009)

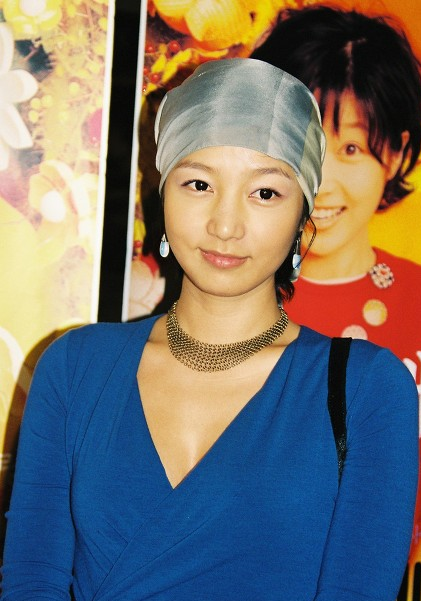
- Jang in 2002
- Born: June 14, 1972; Imsil County, North Jeolla Province, South Korea
- Died: September 1, 2009 (aged 37); Seoul, South Korea
- Other name: Chang Jin-yeong
- Occupation: Actress
- Years active: 1993–2009
- Agent: Yedang Entertainment
- Spouse: Kim Young-kyun

Korean name
- Hangul: 장진영
- Hanja: 張真英
- RR: Jang Jinyeong
- MR: Chang Chinyŏng

Jang Jin-young (Korean: 장진영; June 14, 1972 – September 1, 2009) was a South Korean actress. Following Jang's time as a model and participation in the 1992 Miss Korea beauty contest, she began her acting career on television, in the drama Angel in My Heart (1997). She made her film debut in Ghost in Love (1999). Jang's acting career took off following her breakthrough performance, in Sorum (2001). She starred in a variety of film genres, among them romantic films such as Over the Rainbow (2002), Scent of Love (2003), Singles (2003), and Between Love and Hate (2006), biographical film Blue Swallow (2005), and drama series Lobbyist (2007).

Jang received critical praise and won a number of awards for her work. She became only the second winner of two Blue Dragon Film Awards for Best Actress, having won in 2001 for Sorum, and again in 2003 for Singles. As of 2008, Jang was one of the highest paid stars in the Korean film industry, earning in the region of ₩400 million per film.

On September 1, 2009, Jang died at the age of 37 after a year-long battle with stomach cancer.

== Early life ==
Jang Jin-young was born on June 14, 1972, in Imsil, North Jeolla Province, South Korea. She attended Jeonju Jungang Girls' High School.

As a third-year high school student, she began to be interested in fashion and decided to change her career plans. She had originally intended to go to music school to major in piano. She was enrolled in the Department of Costume Design at Sangmyung University.

== Career ==
=== Early work ===
Jang Jin-young began her career as a model, and represented the South Chungcheong Province at the 1992 Miss Korea beauty contest. After making the transition into acting with appearances in a number of TV dramas, she received her film debut with a supporting role in the 1999 fantasy Ghost in Love. In 2000, she appeared in Kim Jee-woon's The Foul King, one of the biggest domestic hits of that year, and Jang's tough image in the film drew attention from critics, with Derek Elley of Variety saying that she "makes an impression as the lightly romantic, not-so-fragile daughter". Also that year, she had a role in the fire fighting film Siren.

=== Breakthrough and mainstream success ===
Jang as the abused, chain smoking Sun-yeong in Sorum (2001), her first starring role for which she won several awards.

Jang's first starring role was in the 2001 psychological horror film Sorum, in which she was cast against type as Sun-yeong, a chain smoking abused wife. The part required her to look badly bruised and disheveled, and she found the regimen of three packets of cigarettes per day to be quite grueling, despite being a smoker herself. Both the film and Jang's performance received praise from critics, with Peter Y. Paik of The Film Journal commenting, "[Jang] Jin-young is utterly convincing in her portrayal of a battered wife, conveying both vulnerability and grit." Jang won Best New Actress at the Busan Film Critics Awards, Best Actress at the Blue Dragon Film Awards.

In 2002, Jang co-starred with Lee Jung-jae in Over the Rainbow, a romantic comedy film in which her character helps an old college friend to recover his lost memory, and she was praised in a review at Korean Film for giving a "lively performance". The following year, Jang appeared alongside Park Hae-il in the more dramatic Scent of Love. Her next film, also released in 2003, was the light-hearted comedy Singles, based on a novel by Japanese writer Kamata Toshio. Jang headed an ensemble cast as Na-nan, a down on her luck woman on the verge of turning thirty, who she described as being "very close to my actual real-life self" in terms of her personality. Singles proved to be one of the big hits of that year, and also found favor with critics, with Jang in particular being lauded for her performance. Derek Elley of Variety wrote, "With her effervescent, ingenuous goofiness, Jang dominates the movie, and twins well with [Uhm Jung-hwa]". Jang again won Best Actress at the Blue Dragon Film Awards, becoming only the second actress to win the award twice, and also received the Popularity Award.

Jang as aviation pioneer Park Kyung-won in the 2005 biopic Blue Swallow.

For her next project, Jang was cast as the lead in Blue Swallow, a ₩9.7 billion biopic of aviation pioneer Park Kyung-won, which reunited her with Sorum director Yoon Jong-chan, and Singles co-star Kim Joo-hyuk. She worked on the film for some 15 months, during which time she was required to learn Japanese and overcome her fear of heights, and later said, "At every moment, I was pushing my limits. My experiences as [Park Kyung-won] taught me a lot and made me work even harder to live my life to the fullest." Released towards the end of 2005, the film found itself the subject of strong criticism, with Park seen by many as having been a pro-Japanese figure during the Japanese colonial rule of Korea, and it subsequently sold a disappointing 600,000 tickets at the Korean box office. Nevertheless, Jang received several award nominations for her role in the film, and won Best Actress at the 2006 Critic's Choice Awards.

In 2006, Jang appeared in the film Between Love and Hate, the directorial debut of actor and screenwriter Kim Hae-gon. She played the role of Yeon-ah, a carefree bargirl who embarks on a tumultuous love-hate relationship with slacker Young-woon (played by Kim Seung-woo), despite him being engaged to another woman. In order to give a realistic portrayal of a bargirl, Jang spent time touring underground bars and room salons, but had difficulty identifying with her character, saying, "I couldn't easily understand why she had to act that way... I was embarrassed at times to stand in front of the camera and act like that." Her performance won Best Leading Actress at the Korean Film Awards, and she also received nominations at the Blue Dragon Film Awards and Baeksang Arts Awards.

Jang made a return to television in 2007, when she was cast as one of the leads in the SBS drama series Lobbyist, a ₩12 billion production about lobbyists and political conspiracies. Filming began in New York City on April 24, and in the wake of the Virginia Tech massacre it was reported that the production company had taken out insurance policies on Jang and her co-stars over fears of related incidents.

== In the media ==
In 2006, Movie Week magazine compiled a list of Korea's 25 most beautiful faces, which named Jang as the sixth most beautiful woman. The results were gathered by polling 86 of the top domestic photographers.

Jang was one of the guests at the "Curtain Call" section of Star Summit Asia, a side event of the inaugural Asian Film Market to showcase established Asian stars for the international marketplace. Speaking at the press conference, she professed a love for action films, and expressed a desire to one day star in a Chinese action film.

== Later life and death ==
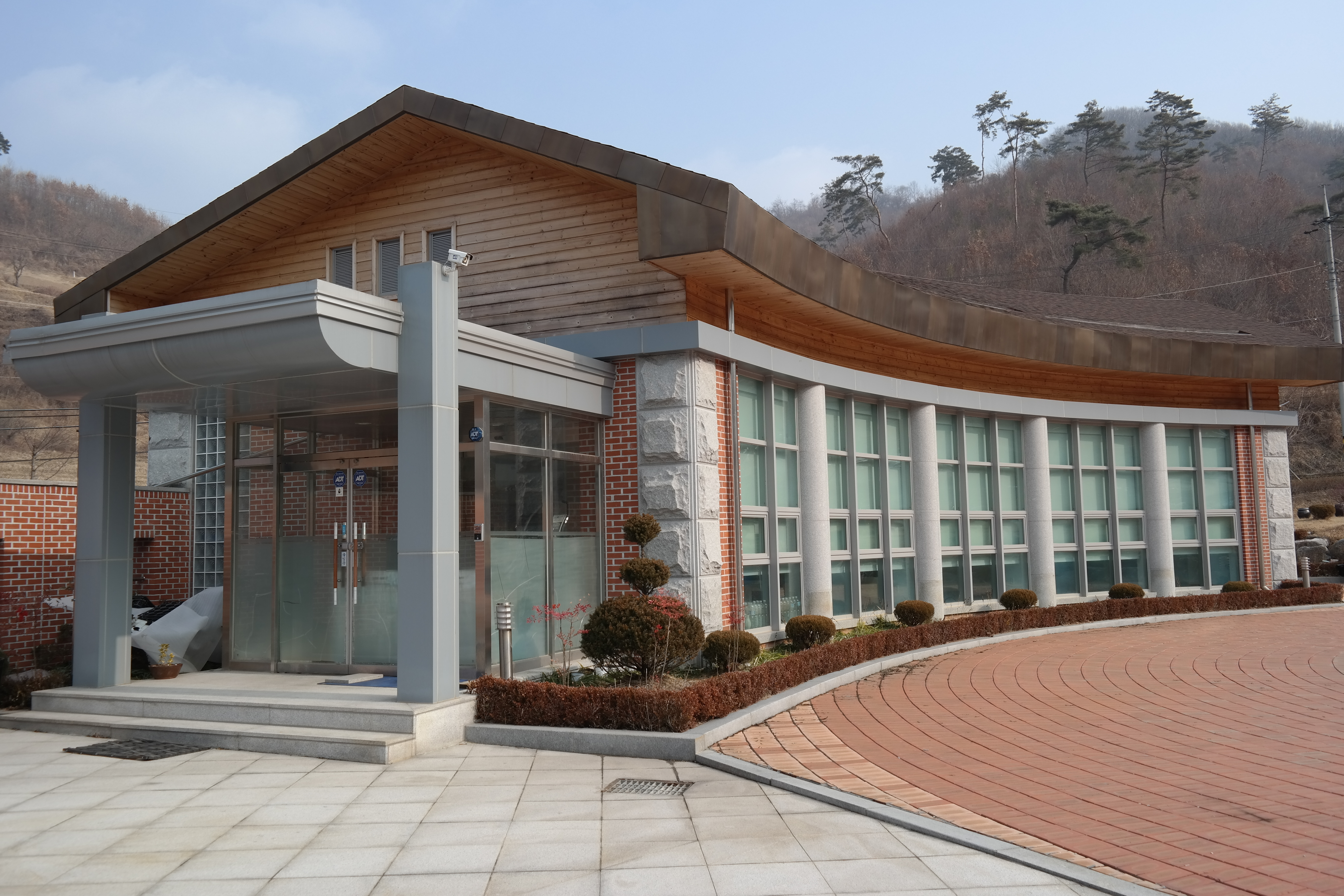
Jang Jin-young Memorial Hall

During a regular health check on September 22, 2008, Jang was diagnosed with stomach cancer. This was considered a strange and tragic coincidence as she was well known for her role in Scent of Love as a woman dying of stomach cancer. She had been suffering from pains while eating, but had believed the cause to be a stomach ulcer. In a telephone interview aired on MBC's After News program on November 29, 2008, Jang told the public that she had been undergoing Western medical treatments coupled with traditional herbal remedies, and that her health was improving. Eventually, her condition continued to deteriorate and Jang was hospitalized in Seoul, where she died at approximately 4:04 p.m. on September 1, 2009.

=== Secret marriage ===
After Jang's death, it was belatedly revealed that she had been secretly married. She had wed her husband, Kim Young-kyun, while in the U.S. for cancer treatment, and registered the marriage to make it official in Korea just days before her death. Kim later published a book commemorating the 608 days of their relationship, titled My Last Gift To Her. The book features previously unreleased photos (including that of their Las Vegas wedding), as well as some letters and text messages they exchanged. When asked in an interview why he wrote the book, Kim answered: "Right now, my memories of Jin-young are distinct, but I'm human and someday my memories will grow dimmer. I don't want to lose my memories of being with her. Writing this was my way to deal with that. Someone who writes for a living told me that it helps and is a good method for organizing their emotions, and those words motivated me to write the book. Also, as I've already said in the prologue, Jin-young was an actress who had a great future ahead of her, and I thought it would help in having her remembered beautifully. Even when her time was limited, she didn't give up hope and lived diligently, and I wanted to let people know of Jin-young's passionate life."

== Filmography ==
=== Film ===
Year	Title	Role	Ref.
1999	Ghost in Love	Lee Young-eun	
2000	The Foul King	Jang Min-young	
2000	Siren	Ye-rin	
2001	Sorum	Sun-young	
2002	Over the Rainbow	Kang Young-hee	
2003	Scent of Love	Min Hee-jae	
2003	Singles	Na-nan	
2005	Blue Shallow	Park Kyung-won	
2006	Between Love and Hate	Yeon-ah	

=== Television series ===
Year	Title	Role	Notes	Ref.
1997	Angel in My Heart	Ahn So-yeon	Support role	
1998	Soonpoong Clinic	Jang Jin-young	Support role	
1998	Heart of Lies	Lee Hyun-ji	Support role	
1998	Blushing with Love	Kang Eun-hye	Support role	
2007	Lobbyist	Maria / Yoo So-young	Main role	

== Awards and nominations ==
Name of the award ceremony, year presented, category, nominee of the award, and the result of the nomination
Award ceremony	Year	Category	Nominee / Work	Result	Ref.
Busan Film Critics Awards	2001	Best New Actress	Sorum	Won	
Blue Dragon Film Awards	2001	Best Actress	Sorum	Won	
Festival de Cine de Sitges	2001	Best Actress	Sorum	Won	
Director's Cut Awards	2001	Best Actress	Sorum	Won	
Fantasporto International Fantasy Film Award	2002	Best Actress	Sorum	Won	
Blue Dragon Film Awards	2003	Best Actress	Singles	Won	
Blue Dragon Film Awards	2003	Popular Star Award	Singles	Won	
Korean Film Awards	2003	Best Actress	Singles	Nominated	
Baeksang Arts Awards	2006	Best Actress	Blue Swallow	Nominated	
Grand Bell Awards	2006	Best Actress	Blue Swallow	Nominated	
Korean Film Awards	2006	Best Actress	Between Love and Hate	Won	
Blue Dragon Film Awards	2006	Best Actress	Between Love and Hate	Nominated	
Korean Association of Film Critics Awards	2006	Best Actress	Blue Swallow	Won	
Baeksang Arts Awards	2007	Best Actress	Between Love and Hate	Nominated	
Grimae Awards	2007	Best Actress	Lobbyist	Won	
SBS Drama Awards	2007	Best Actress in a Miniseries	Lobbyist	Nominated	
Style Icon Awards	2009	Special Award	—N/a	Won	
Blue Dragon Film Awards	2009	Special Award	—N/a	Won	
Director's Cut Awards	2009	Memorial Award	—N/a	Won	
