= Kim Hŭmsun =

Korean general (fl. 7th century)

- Hangul: 김흠순
- Hanja: 金欽純
- RR: Gim Heumsun
- MR: Kim Hŭmsun

Kim Hŭmsun (Korean: 김흠순, born c. 599) was a general in 7th-century Silla. He is said to have been the great-grandchild of King Guhae of Geumgwan Gaya, the last ruler of the Geumgwan Gaya state. This would have given him a very high position in Silla's bone rank system, which governed the political and military status that a person could attain. His elder brother, Kim Yu-sin, was known as one of the great general of Korean history, and he led the unification of the Korean peninsula.

== Popular culture ==
- Portrayed by Park Jae-woong in the 2012–2013 KBS1 TV series Dream of the Emperor.
