= Lee Jung-jae =

South Korean actor (born 1972)

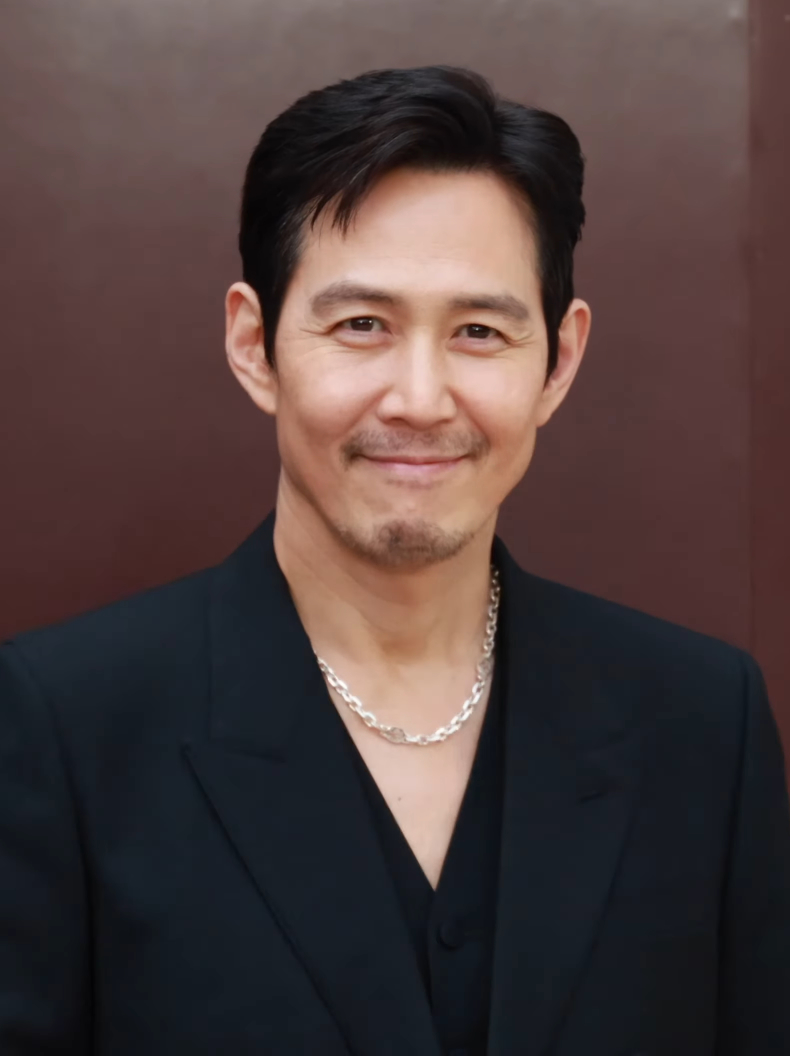
- Lee in 2024
- Born: December 15, 1972 (age 53) (Note: In Korea, 1 year is added to the person's age after birth.); Seoul, South Korea
- Education: Dongguk University (MA)
- Occupations: Actor; film director; producer; screenwriter
- Years active: 1993–present
- Agents: Artist Company (Note: Co-founder, with Jung Woo-sung); Creative Artists Agency
- Awards: Full list
- Honours: Geumgwan Order of Cultural Merit (2022)

Korean name
- Hangul: 이정재
- Hanja: 李政宰
- RR: I Jeongjae
- MR: I Chŏngjae

Lee Jung-jae (Korean: 이정재; born December 15, 1972) is a South Korean actor, filmmaker, and businessman. Considered one of South Korea's most successful actors, he has received numerous accolades, including a Primetime Emmy Award, an Actor Award, a Critics' Choice Television Award, six Baeksang Arts Awards, in addition to nominations for a Golden Globe Award and a Gotham Award. Lee is also a businessman who has launched a restaurant chain in Seoul and founded several companies, including the development firm Seorim C&D, some of which he co-owns with Jung Woo-sung.

Lee started his career as a fashion model, and gained popularity for his role in television drama Sandglass (1995). After his breakthrough in An Affair (1998), Lee's film career took off. He has starred in dramas such as City of the Rising Sun (1999), romantic films Il Mare (2000) and Last Present (2001), comedies such as Oh! Brothers (2003), action films Typhoon (2005) and Deliver Us from Evil (2020), thrillers The Housemaid (2010) and New World (2013), heist film The Thieves (2012), and espionage films Assassination (2015), Operation Chromite (2016) and Hunt (2022). He won Best Supporting Actor at the 50th Baeksang Arts Awards for his role in The Face Reader (2013).

In 2021, Lee gained international fame for his role as Seong Gi-hun of Netflix's Squid Game. For his performance in the show's first season, he was nominated for numerous accolades, including the Critics' Choice Television Award for Best Actor in a Drama Series, the Golden Globe Award for Best Actor – Television Series Drama, the Primetime Emmy Award for Outstanding Lead Actor in a Drama Series and the Screen Actors Guild Award for Outstanding Performance by a Male Actor in a Drama Series, making him the first male actor from Asia to receive individual nominations in those categories across all four awards shows, with his win for the latter two also making history. His season 2 and 3 portrayals received mixed reviews. In December 2021, he was selected as Gallup Korea's Film Actor of the Year. In 2022, Lee was awarded the Geumgwan (1st Class) Order of Cultural Merit, the highest decoration awarded to those who have contributed to South Korean culture and arts.

== Early life and education ==
Lee Jung-jae was born on December 15, 1972, in the Jung District of Seoul. He enrolled at Dongguk University, and was awarded his master's degree from the university's Department of Theater & Film Art in the Graduate School of Cultural Arts, in August 2008. He made his first foray into theater in December of that same year, taking on the titular role in Hamlet in Water. The play ran for four days at his alma mater's Lee Hae-rang Theater.

== Career ==
=== 1993–1999: Acting beginnings and breakout roles ===
Lee was discovered by designer Ha Yong-soo while he was working at a café in Apgujeong-dong (located in the Gangnam District), then worked as a fashion model for a number of years. Upon making his acting debut with the 1993 TV drama Dinosaur Teacher, Lee became a star practically overnight, and was almost always cast in lead roles thereafter. A year later, he received favorable reviews for his first big screen role in Bae Chang-ho's The Young Man, but it was the 1994 hit campus drama Feelings that made him a household name.

In 1995, what was supposed to be a small supporting role as the heroine's silent, devoted bodyguard in ratings behemoth Sandglass turned Lee into a national heartthrob, such that his screen time was increased throughout the series' run.

However, that success would be cut short because shortly after, he would be called up for National Service.

In 1997, following his return from the military, his career went into a slight decline. It was then he decided to return to acting school by enrolling into Dongguk University's Department of Theatre & Film.

Lee's acting breakthrough would come in late 1998 in the award-winning film An Affair by E J-yong. This was followed up by another success, City of the Rising Sun, for which he won Best Actor at the Blue Dragon Film Awards and the Korean Association of Film Critics Awards.

=== 2000–2009: Career fluctuations ===
Though his time-travel romance Il Mare was not a popular success in 2000, since then it has developed a loyal fan base a la Somewhere in Time and attained the status of a minor classic among Korean cinema fans (Keanu Reeves played Lee's role in the 2006 Hollywood remake The Lake House). Lee followed up with melodrama Last Present alongside Lee Young-ae and action mystery The Last Witness directed by Bae Chang-ho.

In 2002, Lee starred alongside Jang Jin-young in Over the Rainbow.

In 2003, he starred opposite Lee Beom-soo in Oh! Brothers, a comedy about two brothers, one of whom has an unusual disease. The film was one of Lee's biggest hits ever, topping three million admissions at the local box office. Nonetheless, he remained out of the limelight for the next couple years. Finally at the end of 2005 he returned in Typhoon, a big-budget action blockbuster by Kwak Kyung-taek, the director of Friend.

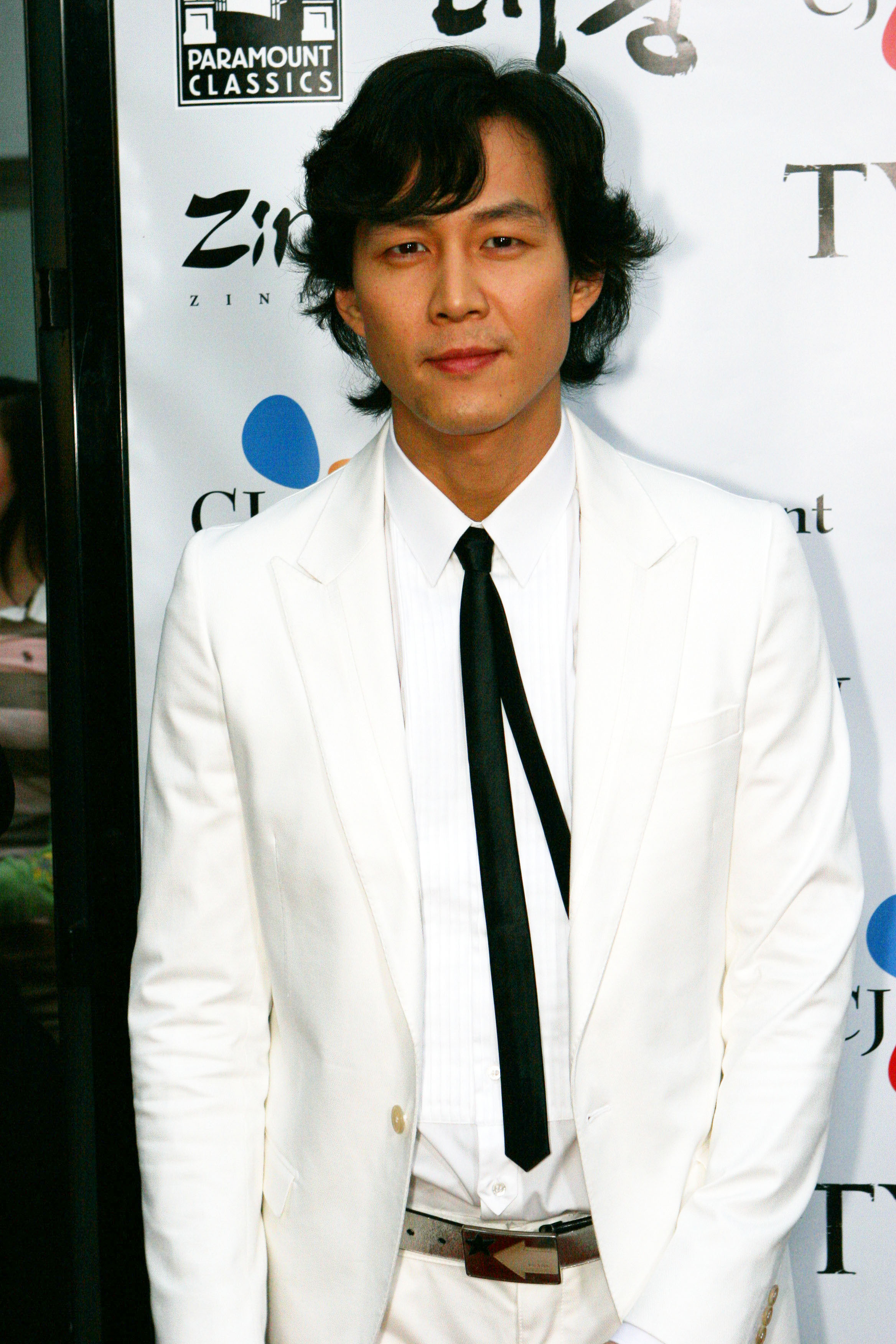
Lee at the US premiere of Typhoon in May 2006

Lee's much-anticipated return to television a decade after his memorable turn in Sandglass (1995) was not successful ratings-wise; Air City (2007) and Triple (2009).

With the period action comedy The Accidental Gangster and the Mistaken Courtesan, Lee said he wanted to try his hand at playing a different kind of role, a comical loose cannon type of character. Though it was not successful at the box office, he still considers it one of his most memorable films.

=== 2010–2019: Resurgence and commercial success ===
Lee rejuvenated his career in the high-profile 2010 erotic thriller The Housemaid, which screened at the Cannes Film Festival, and Toronto International Film Festival. Lee nabbed a Best Actor award at the Fantasporto Director's Week. As his next project, he joined the star-studded ensemble cast of The Thieves, a 2012 heist film that became the second all-time highest-grossing movie in Korean cinema history.

El Fin del Mundo ("The End of the World") is a 13-minute split screen film made by visual artists Moon Kyung-won and Jeon Joon-ho, which depicts the destructive environmental changes the world faces in the future and the subsequent end of art and birth of new art based on dialogue between two artists in different times and space, played by Lee and Im Soo-jung. The film was screened at dOCUMENTA in 2012, considered the world's most prestigious and innovative contemporary art platform. A longtime art collector and honorary ambassador for the National Museum of Contemporary Art in 2011–2012, Lee also narrated the 2013 TV documentary Contemporary Art, Bury the Boundary which highlighted homegrown Korean artists.

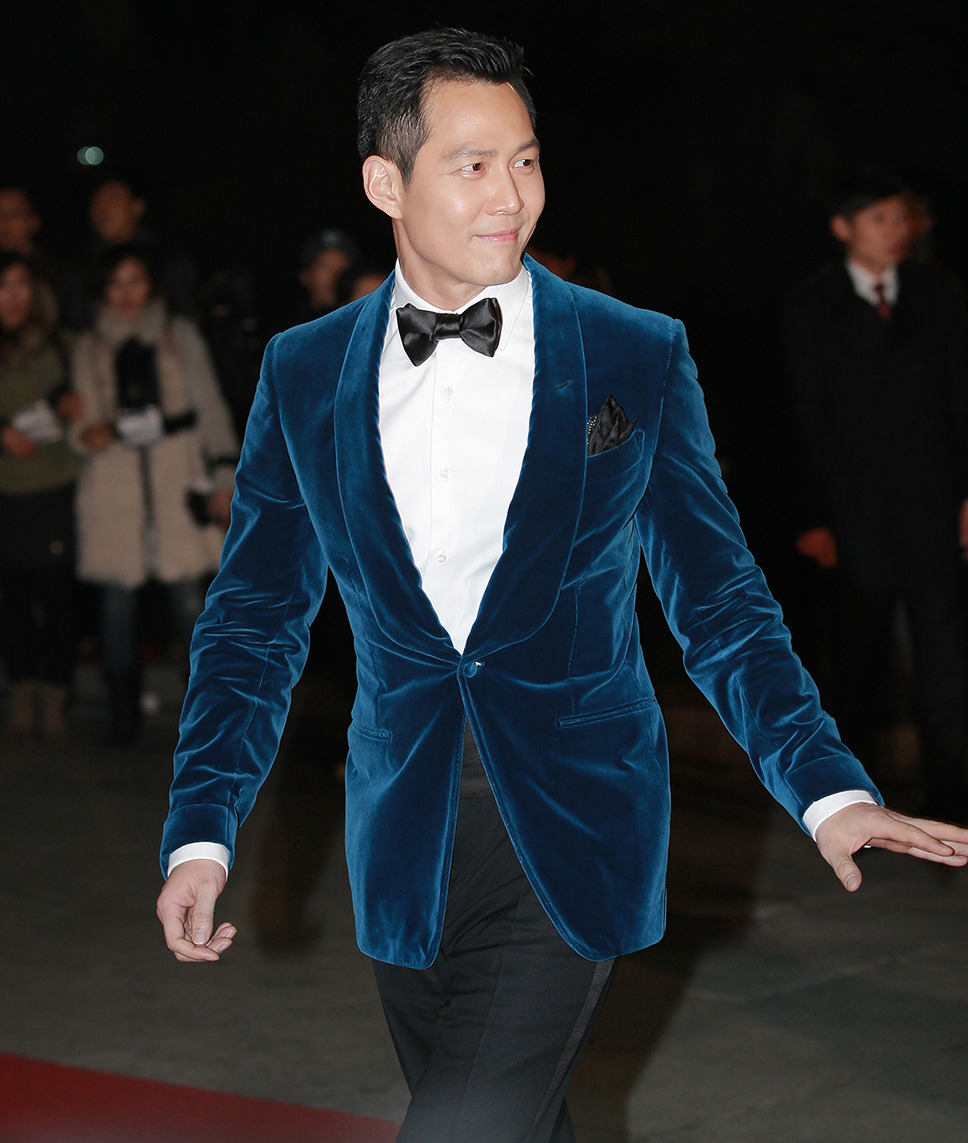
Lee in 2013

He played a police officer who goes undercover in a crime organization in the crime thriller New World (2013). Lee said he was grateful to co-star Choi Min-sik, who suggested casting him to the director. He later signed on to be exclusively managed by C-JeS Entertainment, reportedly choosing the agency after he worked with Song Ji-hyo in New World. Lee then portrayed Prince Suyang opposite Song Kang-ho in the period film The Face Reader (2013), for which he won Best Supporting Actor at the Blue Dragon Film Awards and the Baeksang Arts Awards. This was followed by the action comedy Big Match in 2014, where he played a mixed martial arts fighter trying to save his brother by winning an elaborate high-stakes game.

In 2015, he reunited with The Thieves director Choi Dong-hoon and actress Jun Ji-hyun in Assassination, set in 1930s Korea and Shanghai during the Japanese occupation, who had previously act on Il Mare. Lee won a Best Actor award at the 24th Buil Film Awards and was named Actor of the Year at the 3rd Marie Claire Asia Star Awards.

Lee then starred in his first Chinese film, the crime drama Tik Tok. He returned to the Korean screen with the box office hit, Operation Chromite, playing a South Korean lieutenant in the navy, the man responsible for reversing the tide of the Korean War.

Lee's films in 2017 include the historical epic Warriors of the Dawn and the fantasy blockbuster Along With the Gods: The Two Worlds.

In 2019, Lee starred in Svaha: The Sixth Finger, an occult film. The same year Lee returned to television with his first drama in a decade, the JTBC political drama Chief of Staff alongside Shin Min-a, where he plays a political advisor. In 2020, Lee starred in the action film Deliver Us from Evil alongside Hwang Jung-min and Park Jeong-min.

=== 2021–present: Squid Game and international fame ===
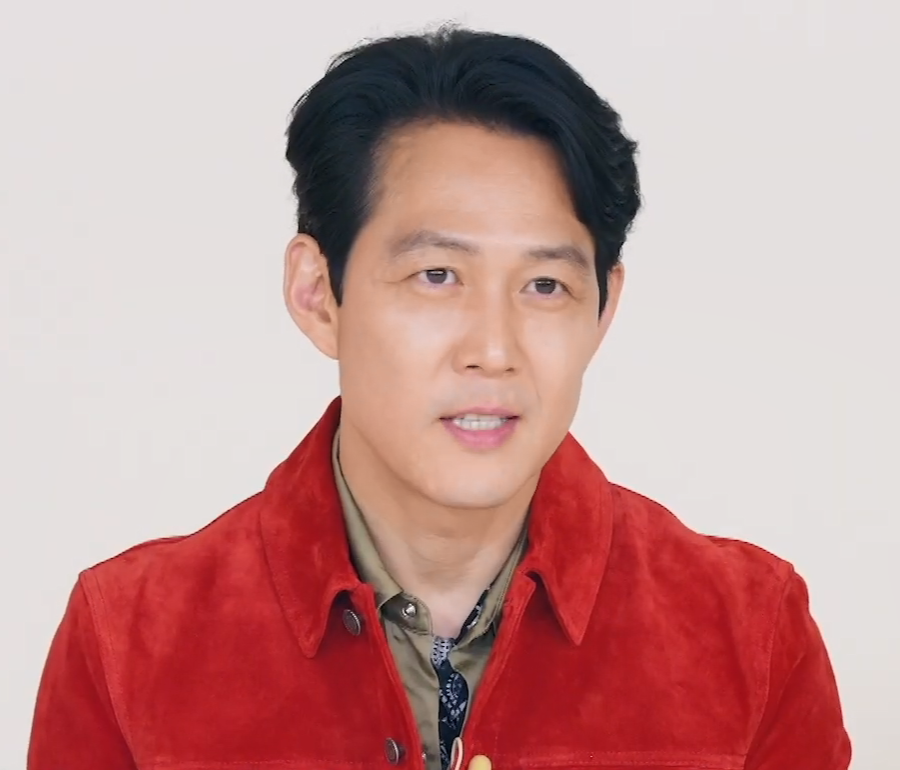
Lee during a Squid Game interview in September 2021

In September 2021, Lee starred as Seong Gi-hun, the main protagonist of Netflix's hit survival drama Squid Game. Series creator and director Hwang Dong-hyuk said he chose to cast Lee as Gi-hun as to "destroy his charismatic image portrayed in his previous roles". Due to the worldwide success of the series, Gi-hun became Lee's most famous role to date, and his performance in the first season has been received generally well.

Lee and the series received nominations at the Gotham Independent Film Awards 2021 with him individually nominated for Outstanding Performance in a New Series. Lee also received nominations for the Critics' Choice Television Award for Best Actor in a Drama Series, the Golden Globe Award for Best Actor – Television Series Drama, and the Screen Actors Guild Award for Outstanding Performance by a Male Actor in a Drama Series, making him the first male actor from Asia and Korea to receive individual nominations in those categories across all three awards shows with his win and costar HoYeon Jung (who starred as Kang Sae-byeok) winning the respective female award making history for the show becoming the first non-English language television series to win at the SAG Awards. He was also nominated along with his costars for the Screen Actors Guild Award for Outstanding Performance by an Ensemble in a Drama Series. He also won the Primetime Emmy Award for Outstanding Lead Actor in a Drama Series in 2022 for his performance in Squid Game, making him the first person to win that award for a non-English-speaking role, and the first Asian man to win that award.

On November 11, 2021, it was announced Lee was selected as a global ambassador for luxury brand Gucci. In 2022, Lee made his directorial debut with the spy action film Hunt, in which he also stars alongside Jung Woo-sung. The film had its world premiere at the 2022 Cannes Film Festival in May 2022. On February 26, Lee signed with Creative Artists Agency.

In April 2022, Hwang confirmed that the characters of Gi-hun and the Front Man would return for the second season. In the second season, Gi-hun dives into the mysterious survival game, starting another life-or-death game with new participants gathered to win the prize of ₩45.6 billion. During Netflix's Tudum: A Global Fan Event in June 2023, Lee was confirmed to reprise his role alongside Lee Byung-hun, Gong Yoo and Wi Ha-joon. It was released on December 26, 2024, and reprised his role in the third and final season on June 25, 2025. His season 2 and 3 portrayals were more mixed, with critics feeling his character's actions were frustrating and made little sense. Despite these criticisms, Lee has been praised for his ability to shift from a lighthearted character to a darker one in the second and third seasons.

On September 8, 2022, Lee was cast as the male lead in the Star Wars series The Acolyte, released on Disney+. It is his first English-language role. In December 2022, Lee received the Geumgwan Order of Cultural Merit from President Yoon Suk Yeol, which is the highest decoration awarded to those who have contributed to culture and arts.

In December 2024, Lee was invited to be a guest on The Tonight Show Starring Jimmy Fallon. In 2025, Lee starred in the romantic comedy series Nice to Not Meet You opposite Lim Ji-yeon which aired on tvN. He played a washed up actor who became a star detective.

== Other activities ==
=== Business ventures ===
Apart from acting, Lee is known for launching a chain of upscale Italian restaurants in Seoul named after his film Il Mare. Having studied interior design, he assumed responsibility for designing the interior of his restaurants. Lee also founded the real estate development company Seorim C&D in 2008, and owns several businesses with actor Jung Woo-sung, a close friend whom he first worked with on the film City of the Rising Sun.

In May 2016, Lee and Jung established and became CEOs of their entertainment label Artist Company.

=== Philanthropy ===
On March 8, 2022, Lee additionally donated ₩100 million to the Hope Bridge Disaster Relief Association along with Jung Woo-sung to help the victims of the massive wildfire that started in Uljin, Gyeongbuk and had spread to Samcheok, Gangwon.

On August 3, 2022, Hope Bridge Disaster Relief Association announced that Lee along with Jung Woo-sung joined the Hope Bridge Honors Club, a group of major donors with more than ₩100 million donations.

On November 7, 2025, Lee appeared on the tvN variety show You Quiz on the Block, where he won a ₩1 million prize by correctly answering a quiz question. He donated the prize money, along with an additional ₩10 million of his own funds, totaling ₩11 million, to support a sanitary pad assistance program for underprivileged female adolescents in South Korea.

== Personal life ==
=== Legal issues ===
In 1999, Lee was charged with driving under the influence (DUI) after crashing his BMW into a car in the adjacent lane. His blood alcohol content was 0.269%. As a result, his driver's license was revoked. He also got another DUI in 2002 that led to his license being revoked again.

=== Relationships ===
In January 2015, Lee confirmed that he was dating Im Se-ryung. Lee had previously dated Kim Min-hee.

== Filmography ==
=== Film ===
Year	Title	Role	Notes	Ref.
1994	The Young Man	Lee Han		
1996	Albatross	Pyeong-san		
1997	Fire Bird	Young-hoo		
1997	Father vs. Son	Park Soo-seok		
1998	An Affair	Woo-in		
1999	City of the Rising Sun	Hong-ki		
1999	The Uprising	Lee Jae-su		
2000	Interview	Eun-seok		
2000	Il Mare	Han Sung-hyun		
2000	Asako in Ruby Shoes	Woo-in	Korean-Japanese co-production	
2001	Last Present	Jung Yong-ki		
2001	The Last Witness	Detective Oh		
2002	Over the Rainbow	Lee Jin-su		
2003	Oh! Brothers	Oh Sang-woo		
2005	Typhoon	Kang Se-jong		
2008	The Accidental Gangster and the Mistaken Courtesan	Cheon-doong		
2010	The Housemaid	Hoon		
2012	The Thieves	Popie		
2013	New World	Lee Ja-sung		
2013	The Face Reader	Prince Suyang		
2014	Big Match	Choi Ik-ho		
2015	Assassination	Yeom Seok-jin		
2016	Tik Tok	Jiang Cheng-jun	Chinese-Korean co-production	
2016	Operation Chromite	Jang Hak-soo		
2017	Warriors of the Dawn	To-woo		
2017	Along with the Gods: The Two Worlds	Yeomra	Special appearance	
2018	Along with the Gods: The Last 49 Days	Yeomra	Special appearance	
2019	Svaha: The Sixth Finger	Pastor Park		
2019	Trade Your Love	Lawyer	Cameo	
2020	Deliver Us from Evil	Sun Ray		
2022	Hunt	Park Pyung-ho	Also director, writer and producer	
2024	Revolver	Lim Seok-yong	Cameo	

=== Television ===
Year	Title	Role	Notes	Ref.
1993	Dinosaur Teacher	Lee Jung-jae		
1994	The Lonely Man	Jae-jung		
1994	Feelings	Han Joon		
1995	Love Is Blue	Na Jae-sang		
1995	Sandglass	Baek Jae-hee		
1997	Snail	Dong-cheol		
1998	White Nights 3.98	Lee Young-jun		
2007	Air City	Kim Ji-sung		
2009	Triple	Shin Hwal		
2019	Chief of Staff	Jang Tae-joon	Season 1–2	
2021	Delayed Justice	Jang Tae-joon	Cameo (episode 19)	
2021	Dramaworld 2	Man in commercial	Cameo (episode 8–9)	
2021–2025	Squid Game	Seong Gi-hun (Player 456)	Season 1–3	
2024	Star Wars: The Acolyte	Sol		
2025	Nice to Not Meet You	Lim Hyeon-joon		
TBA	Ray	Ray Sun		

== Ambassadorship ==
- Public Relations Ambassador 2030 Busan World Expo (2021)
- Ambassador for 2022 Seoul Fashion Week with Choi So-ra

== See also ==
- List of Primetime Emmy Award winners
