= Jung Jin-young (actor) =

South Korean actor

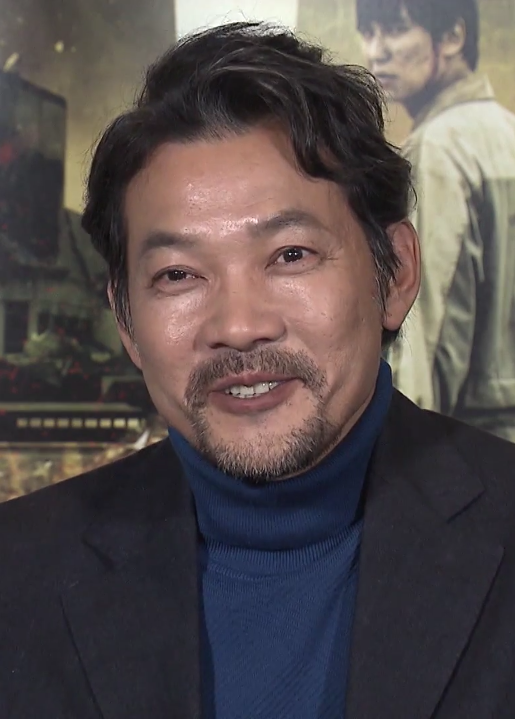
- Jung in November 2016
- Born: November 19, 1964 (age 61); Dobong-gu, Seoul, South Korea
- Education: Seoul National University - Korean Language and Literature
- Occupation: Actor
- Years active: 1988–present
- Agent: Hicon Entertainment

Korean name
- Hangul: 정진영
- RR: Jeong Jinyeong
- MR: Chŏng Chinyŏng

Jung Jin-young (Korean: 정진영; born November 19, 1964) is a South Korean actor. He has starred in numerous films, including Hi! Dharma! (2001), Bunt (2007), and The Case of Itaewon Homicide (2009). Jung is best known for his frequent collaborations with director Lee Joon-ik in Once Upon a Time in a Battlefield (2003) and its sequel Battlefield Heroes (2011), The Happy Life (2007), Sunny (2008), and particularly for his role as King Yeonsan in the hugely successful King and the Clown (2005).

Jung also appeared in the television series The Kingdom of the Winds (2008–2009), Dong Yi (2010), and Brain (2011–2012).

== Filmography ==
=== Film ===
==== As actor ====
Year	Title	Role	Notes	Ref.
1992	Opening the Closed School Gates			
1994	For Rosa		Short film	
1995	Terrorist			
1997	Green Fish	3rd brother	also credited as assistant director	
1997	Partner			
1998	A Promise	Eom Gi-tak		
1999	The Ring Virus	Choi Yeol		
2000	Bichunmoo			
2001	Prison World Cup			
2001	Guns & Talks			
2001	Hi! Dharma!	Cheong-myeong		
2003	Wild Card	Oh Young-dal		
2003	Once Upon a Time in a Battlefield			
2004	Hi! Dharma 2: Showdown in Seoul	Monk Jeong-myeong		
2004	Chul-soo and Young-hee	Bulldog teacher	Cameo	
2005	King and the Clown	King Yeonsan		
2006	Love Phobia	Dr. Chu	Cameo	
2006	If You Were Me 3		"An Ephemeral Life"	
2007	Bunt	Heo Jin-gyoo		
2007	For Eternal Hearts	Professor Soo-yeong	Cameo	
2007	The Happy Life			
2008	Sunny	Kim Jeong-man		
2009	The Case of Itaewon Homicide	Public prosecutor Park		
2011	Battlefield Heroes	Kim Yoo-sin		
2011	S.I.U.	Police chief Hwang Doo-soo		
2012	Love 911	Detective Oh	Cameo	
2013	Miracle in Cell No. 7	Jang Min-hwan	Special appearance	
2014	Another Promise	Judge		
2014	Tabloid Truth	President Park		
2014	Ode to My Father	Deok-soo's father		
2015	Gangnam Blues	Gil-soo		
2015	Time Renegades	Chief Kang		
2016	Pandora	Pyeong-seok		
2016	Grandfather	Kim Yang-don		
2017	Claire's Camera	Director So Wan-soo		
2017	A Taxi Driver	Reporter Lee	Special appearance	
2017	Man of Will	Go Jin-sa		
2017	The Swindlers	Hwang Yoo-seok	Special appearance	
2018	Heung-boo: The Revolutionist	Jo Hang-ri		
2018	Grass	Kyung-soo		
2018	Ode to the Goose	Innkeeper		
2019	Svaha: The Sixth Finger	Chief Hwang		
2021	The Book of Fish	King Jeongjo	Cameo	
2021	A Year-End Medley	Sang-kyu (Doorman at hotel Emros)		

==== As director ====
Year	Title	Credit	Notes	Ref.
2020	Me and Me	Director, Writer, Producer		

=== Television series ===
Year	Title	Role	Notes	Ref.
2007	l	Himself	Cameo (Ep. 108)	
2008	The Kingdom of the Winds	King Yuri		
2010	Dong Yi	Seo Yong-gi		
2011	Crossing the Yengdo Bridge	Baek Ik-duk		
2011–2012	Brain	Kim Sang-chul		
2012	Love Rain	Seo In-ha		
2012–2013	Jeon Woo-chi	Jeon Woo-chi's Teacher	Cameo (Ep. 1 & 6)	
2014	Angel Eyes	Yoon Jae-bum		
2015–2016	Glamorous Temptation	Kang Suk-hyun		
2018	Sketch	Jang Tae-joon		
2019	Chief of Staff	Lee Seong-min		
2020	My Unfamiliar Family	Kim Sang-sik		
2021	Bulgasal: Immortal Souls	Dan Geuk/Kwon Ho-yeol		
2022	Yonder	Dr. K		
2022	May It Please the Court	Jang Ki-do		
2023	Shadow Detective	Ki Do-hyung	Season 2	
2024	LTNS	Baek-ho		
2024	Queen of Tears	Hong Beom-jun		
2026	Four Hands, Two Sonatas	Kang Seung-woon		

=== Variety shows ===
Year	Title	Role	Notes	Ref.
2002–2006	Unanswered Questions	Himself/MC	Main Host	
2011	MBC Documentary Special	Himself/narrator	Narrator	
2011	Human Survival Challenger in Hawaii	Himself/MC	Main Host	
2011	I Am a Singer 2	Himself/MC	Main Host	

== Bibliography ==
- 꼬마삼총사 하롱하롱 탐험대 (1990)

== Awards and nominations ==
Year	Award	Category	Nominated work	Result	Ref.
1998	19th Blue Dragon Film Awards	Best Supporting Actor	A Promise	Won	
1999	36th Grand Bell Awards	Best Supporting Actor	A Promise	Won	
2008	31st Golden Cinematography Awards	Most Popular Actor	Sunny	Won	
2008	2008 KBS Drama Awards	Excellence Award, Actor in a Miniseries	The Kingdom of The Winds	Won	
2011	33rd Golden Cinematography Awards	Best Actor	Battlefield Heroes	Won	
2011	2011 KBS Drama Awards	Excellence Award, Actor in a Miniseries	Brain	Won	
2015	2015 MBC Drama Awards	Top Excellence Award, Actor in a Longseries	Glamorous Temptation	Won	
2020	24th Fantasia International Film Festival	Special Jury Mention in New Flesh Award for Debut Films	Me and Me	Won	
2020	21st Busan Film Critics Awards	Best New Director	Me and Me	Won	
2020	Cine 21 Awards	Best Director	Me and Me	Won	
2021	41st Blue Dragon Film Awards	Best New Director	Me and Me	Nominated	
2021	8th Wildflower Film Awards	Best New Director	Me and Me	Won	
2021	26th Chunsa Film Art Awards 2021	Best New Director	Me and Me	Nominated	
