= 15th Busan International Film Festival =

2010 edition of film festival

- Opening film: Under the Hawthorn Tree
- Closing film: Camellia
- Location: Busan, South Korea
- Hosted by: Jung Joon-ho; Han Ji-hye
- Festival date: October 7 to October 15, 2010

Busan International Film Festival
- 16th 14th

The 15th Busan International Film Festival was held from October 7 to October 15, 2010, at the Busan Stadium Yachting Center Outdoor Stage, hosted by actors Jung Joon-ho and Han Ji-hye.

A total of 308 films from 67 countries were screened in 6 theaters, with a record 103 world premieres and 52 international premieres. The festival had a total attendance of 182,046.

During the event, festival director Kim Dong-ho announced the construction of the Busan Cinema Center, which will be the main venue of the festival in the future. Kim also announced his own retirement, having served as director since the festival was founded in 1996.

== Program ==
† World premiere
†† International premiere
Award winner

=== Opening Film ===
English title	Original title	Director(s)	Production country/countries	
Under the Hawthorn Tree	山楂树之恋; Shānzhāshù Zhī Liàn	Zhang Yimou	China; Hong Kong, China	††

=== Gala Presentation ===
English title	Original title	Director(s)	Production country/countries	
All About Love	得閒炒飯; Duk haan chau faan	Ann Hui	Hong Kong, China	
Certified Copy	Copie conforme	Abbas Kiarostami	Iran; France; Italy	
Late Autumn	만추; Manchu	Kim Tae-yong	South Korea; Hong Kong, China	
Raavanan		Mani Ratnam	India	
Rolling Home with a Bull	소와 함께 여행하는 법 Sowa Hamgge Yeonghaenghaneun Beom (lit. "How to Travel with a Cow")	Yim Soon-rye	South Korea	†
The Recipe	된장; Doenjang (lit. "Soybean paste")	Anna Lee	South Korea	†
Wall Street: Money Never Sleeps		Oliver Stone	United States	
When Love Comes	当爱来的时候	Chang Tso-chi	Taiwan	†

=== A Window on Asian Cinema ===
English title	Original title	Director(s)	Production country/countries	
13 Assassins	十三人の刺客; Jūsannin no Shikaku	Takashi Miike	Japan	
A Beautiful Mistake	美麗的錯誤	Hui Zhou Lu	China; Hong Kong	†
Abraxas	アブラクサスの祭; Aburakusasu no Matsuri	Naoki Kato	Japan	†
Addicted to Love	老那; Lao Na	Lui Hao	China	
Aftershock	唐山大地震; Tángshān Dà Dìzhèn	Feng Xiaogang	China	
Au Revoir Taipei	一頁台北; Yi yè Tái bei ("First Page Taipei")	Arvin Chen	Taiwan	
Bi, Don't be Afraid!	Bi, đừng sợ!	Phan Dang Di	Vietnam; Germany; France	
Blood Ties	Magkakapatid (lit. "Siblings")	Kim Homer Garcia	Philippines	††
Chassis		Adolfo Alix Jr.	Philippines	†
Clerk		Subhadro Choudhury	India	††
Cold Fish	冷たい熱帯魚; Tsumetai Nettaigyo	Sion Sono	Japan	
Dancing Chaplin	ダンシング・チャップリン; Dansingu Chapurin	Masayuki Suo	Japan	
Donor		Mark Meily	Philippines	††
Driverless	無人駕駛; Wu Ren Jiashi	Zhang Yang	China	††
Emir		Chito S. Roño	Philippines	
Gesher		Vahid Vakilifar	Iran	
Haru's Journey	春との旅; Haru tono tabi	Masahiro Kobayashi	Japan	
Here Comes the Bride, My Mom!	オカンの嫁入り; Okan no Yomeiri	Mipo Oh	Japan	††
Hi-So	ไฮโซ	Aditya Assarat	Thailand	†
Karma		Prasanna Jayakody	Sri Lanka	†
Kites		Anurag Basu	India; United States; Mexico	
Love in a Puff	志明與春嬌	Pang Ho-cheung	Hong Kong, China	
Magic and Loss	향기의 상실; Hyanggiui Sangsil	Lim Kahwai	Japan; Malaysia; South Korea; Hong Kong, China; France	†
Mandoo		Ebrahim Saeedi	Iraq	
My Ex-wife's Wedding	戀愛吧; Lian Ai Ba	Lee Kung-lok	China; Hong Kong, China	†
My Mongolian Mother	額吉; E Ji	Ning Cai	China	†
No. 89 Shimen Road		Haolun Shu	Hong Kong, China; Netherlands	†
Noise		Raj Nidimoru and Krishna D.K.	India	†
Outrage	アウトレイジ; Autoreiji	Takeshi Kitano	Japan	
Pear	梨	Zhang Ciyu	China	†
Pinoy Sunday	台北星期天; Táiběi Xīngqítiān (lit. "Taipei Sunday")	Wi Ding Ho	Taiwan; Philippines; Japan	
Please Do Not Disturb	Lotfan mozahem nashavid	Mohsen Abdolvahab	Iran	††
Railways	RAILWAYS 49歳で電車の運転士になった男の物語; Railways 49-sai de Densha no Untenshi ni Natta Otoko no Monogatari	Yoshinari Nishikori	Japan	
Reign of Assassins	劍雨; Jiàn Yǔ	Su Chao-pin; John Woo	China; Hong Kong, China	
Sandcastle	沙城	Boo Junfeng	Singapore	
Son of Babylon	ابن بابل	Mohamed Al-Daradji	Iraq; United Kingdom; France; United Arab Emirates; Egypt	
Strangers in the City	行きずりの街; Yukizuri no Machi	Junji Sakamoto	Japan	††
Taipei Exchanges	第36個故事; Di 36 ge gu shi	Hsiao Ya-chuan	Taiwan	
The Ditch	夹边沟; Jiabiangou	Wang Bing	China; France; Belgium	
The Drunkard	酒徒; Jiu tu	Freddie Wong	Hong Kong, China	
The First Stone		Ebrahim Forouzesh	Iran	†
The Fourth Portrait	第四張畫	Chung Mong-hong	Taiwan	
The Light Thief	Свет-аке; Svet-Ake	Aktan Arym Kubat	Germany; Kyrgyzstan; France	
The Little Comedian	บ้านฉัน..ตลกไว้ก่อน (พ่อสอนไว้); Baan Chan Talok Wai Korn (Por Son Wai)	Vithaya Thongyuyong	Thailand	††
The Red Eagle	อินทรีแดง; Insi Daeng	Wisit Sasanatieng	Thailand	††
The Tiger Factory		Woo Ming Jin	Malaysia; Japan	
Toilet	トイレット; Toiretto	Naoko Ogigami	Japan; Canada	††
Udaan	उड़ान (lit. "Flight")	Vikramaditya Motwane	India	
Villain	悪人; Akunin	Lee Sang-il	Japan	
Virgin Goat	Laadli Laila	Murali Nair	India; France	††
Wangliang's Ideal	王良的理想	Gao Xiong Jie	China	†
Wararaifu!!	ワラライフ!! Wararaifu!! ("What a Life!!/What a Wonderful Life!!")	Yūichi Kimura	Japan	††
Welcome to Shama Town	決戰剎馬鎮; Juézhàn Shàmǎ Zhèn	Li Weiran	China	††
Year Without a Summer		Tan Chui Mui	Malaysia	†
Zoom Hunting	猎艳	Cho Li	Taiwan	

=== New Currents ===
English title	Original title	Director(s)	Production country/countries	
Ashamed	창피해; Changpihae	Kim Soo-hyeon	South Korea	†
Bleak Night	파수꾼; Pasuggun (lit. "The Lookout")	Yoon Sung-hyun	South Korea	†
Eternity	Tee Rak	Sivaroj Kongsakul	Thailand	†
Floating Lives	CÁNH ĐỒNG BẤT TẬN	Quang Binh Nguyen Phan	Vietnam; Singapore	†
Lover's Discourse	恋人絮语; Lian Ren Xu Yu	Hong Kong, China	Derek Tsang; Jimmy Wan	†
Memories in March		Sanjoy Nag	India	†
My Spectacular Theatre		Lu Yang	China	†
Sampaguita, National Flower		Francis Xavier Pasion	Philippines	††
Strawberry Cliff	贖命; Shú Mìng	Chris Chow	Hong Kong, China; United States; France	†
The Journals of Musan	무산일기; Musanilgi	Park Jung-bum	South Korea	†
The Old Donkey	老驢頭	Li Ruijun	China	†
The Quarter of Scarecrows	Garaqi daholakan	Hassan-Ali Mahmoud	Iran	†
Ways of the Sea	Halaw	Sheron Dayoc	Philippines	††

=== Korean Cinema Today - Panorama ===
English title	Original title	Director(s)	Production country/countries	
Acoustic	어쿠스틱; Eokuseutik	Yoo Sang-hun	South Korea	†
Boy	굿바이 보이; Gootbayi Boyi (lit. "Goodbye, Boy")	Roh Hong-jin	South Korea	†
Come, Closer	조금만 더 가까이; Jogeumman Deo Gaggayi	Kim Jong-kwan	South Korea	†
Funny Neighbors	수상한 이웃들; Soosanghan Yiutdeul	Yang Young-chul	South Korea	†
Hahaha	하하하	Hong Sang-soo	South Korea	
Moss	이끼; Iggi	Kang Woo-suk	South Korea	
No Doubt	돌이킬 수 없는; Dolyigil Soo Eobtneun	Park Soo-young	South Korea	†
Poetry	시 Si	Lee Chang-dong	South Korea	
Secret Reunion	의형제; Uihyeongje (lit. "Sworn Brothers" or "Blood Brothers")	Jang Hoon	South Korea	
The Actresses	여배우들; Yeobaeudeul	E J-yong	South Korea	
The Housemaid	하녀; Hanyeo	Im Sang-soo	South Korea	
The Man from Nowhere	아저씨; Ajeossi	Lee Jeong-beom	South Korea	

=== Korean Cinema Today - Vision ===
English title	Original title	Director(s)	Production country/countries	
Anti Gas Skin	방독피; Bang Dok Pi	Kim Gok; Kim Sun	South Korea	
Dance Town	댄스타운; Daenseutawoon	Jeon Kyu-hwan	South Korea	†
Dooman River	두만강; Doo Man Kang	Zhang Lu	South Korea	
Father Is a Dog	아버지는 개다; Abeojineun Gaeda	Lee Sang-woo	South Korea	†
If You Were Me 5	시선 너머; Siseon Neomeo	Directors: Kang Yi-kwan; Boo Ji-young; Yoon Sung-hyun; Kim Dae-seung; Shin Dong-il	South Korea	†
Ordinary Days	평범한 날들; Pyungbumhan Naldeul	Inan	South Korea	†
Read My Lips	할 수 있는 자가 구하라; Hal Soo Itneun Jaga Guhara	Yoon Seong-ho	South Korea	†
Re-encounter	혜화,동; Hyehwa, Dong (lit. "Hye-hwa, Child")	Min Yong-keun	South Korea	†
Second Half	맛있는 인생; Matyitneun Insaeng	David Cho	South Korea	†
Yeosu	려수; Ryeosu	Jin Kwang-kyo	South Korea	†

=== Korean Cinema Retrospective ===
==== All That She Allows : Star, Actress, and Jimi Kim ====
English title	Director(s)	Production country/countries
Dream	Shin Sang-ok	South Korea
Eul-hwa	Byun Jang-ho	South Korea
How’s Your Wife?	Lee Seong-gu	South Korea
Kilsodeum	Shin Sang-ok	South Korea
Promise of the Flesh	Kim Ki-young	South Korea
The Land	Kim Soo-yong	South Korea
The Tiger Moth	Jo Hae-won	South Korea
Three o’clock P.M. in a Rainy Day	Park Jong-ho	South Korea
Ticket	Im Kwon-taek	South Korea
Under the Sky of Seoul	Lee Hyung-pyo	South Korea

=== World Cinema ===
English title	Original title	Director(s)	Production country/countries	
3 Backyards		Eric Mendelsohn	United States	
A Small Town Called Descent		Jamil XT Qubeka	Republic of South Africa	††
A Useful Life	La vida útil	Federico Veiroj	Uruguay; Spain	
A Woman		Giada Colagrande	Italy; United States	††
And on the Third Day	...Be yom hashlishi	Moshe Ivgy	Israel	††
Archipelago		Joanna Hogg	United Kingdom	†
Asleep in the Sun	Dormir al sol	Alejandro Chomski	Argentina	†
Aurora		Cristi Puiu	Romania; France; Switzerland; Germany	
Basilicata Coast to Coast		Rocco Papaleo	Italy	
Between Two Fires		Agnieszka Lukasiak	Sweden; Poland	††
Bibliotheque Pascal		Szabolcs Hajdu	Hungary; Germany	
Bollywood Dream	Bollywood Dream - O Sonho Bollywoodiano	Beatriz Seigner	Brazil; India; United States	††
By Day and By Night	De día y de noche	Alejandro Molina	Mexico	†
Chantrapas	შანტრაპა	Otar Iosseliani	France; Georgia	
Crying Out	À l'origine d'un cri	Robert Aubert	Canada	††
Dance Marathon		Magdalena Holland-Lazariewicz	Poland	†
Desert		Stephen Kang	New Zealand	†
Donoma		Djinn Carrénard	France	†
Dreamland		Ivan Sen	Australia	††
First Night		Chris Menaul	United Kingdom	††
Forever Young		Pau Freixas	Spain	††
Gastarbeiter		Yusup Razykov	Russia	
Gigola		Laure Charpentier	France	
Heartbeats	Les Amours imaginaires	Xavier Dolan	Canada	
Honey	Bal	Semih Kaplanoğlu	Turkey; Germany	
How I Ended This Summer	Как я провёл этим летом Kak ya provyol etim letom	Alexei Popogrebski	Russia	
If I Want to Whistle, I Whistle	Eu când vreau să fluier, fluier	Florin Șerban	Romania; Sweden	
Illegal	Illégal	Olivier Masset-Depasse	Belgium; Luxembourg; France	
Imani		Caroline Kamya	Uganda	
Incendies		Denis Villeneuve	Canada	
Inside America		Barbara Eder	Austria	
Knifer	Macherovgaltis	Yannis Economides	Greece	†
Kosmos		Reha Erdem	Turkey; Bulgaria	
Life, Above All		Oliver Schmitz	Republic of South Africa; Germany	
Little Baby Jesus of Flandr	En waar de sterre bleef stille staan	Gust Van Den Berghe	Belgium	
Little Rose	Różyczka	Jan Kidawa-Błoński	Poland	
Live!	Zhit	Yuri Bykov	Russia	††
Love Is All We Need		Jorge Duran	Brazil	
Malavoglia		Pasquale Scimeca	Italy	
Mamma Gógó		Friðrik Þór Friðriksson	Iceland	
Morgen		Marian Crișan	Romania; France; Hungary	
Mother of Asphalt	Majka asfalta	Dalibor Matanić	Croatia	††
My Joy	Счастье моё Schastye moyo Щастя моє Shchastya moye	Sergei Loznitsa	Germany; Ukraine; Netherlands	
Ocean Black		Marion Hänsel	Belgium; France	
October	Octubre	Daniel Vega Vidal; Diego Vega Vidal	Peru; Venezuela; Spain	
Of Gods and Men	Des hommes et des dieux (lit. "Of Men and of Gods")	Xavier Beauvois	France	
On the Path	Na putu	Jasmila Žbanić	Bosnia and Herzegovina; Austria; Germany; Croatia	
On Tour	Tournée	Mathieu Amalric	France; Germany	
Oranges and Sunshine		Jim Loach	United Kingdom; Australia	†
Orly		Angela Schanelec	Germany; France	
Outside the Law	Hors-la-loi خارجون عن القانون	Rachid Bouchareb	France; Algeria; Belgium; Tunisie	
Portraits in a Sea of Lies		Carlos Gaviria	Colombia; Republic of South Africa	
Potiche		François Ozon	France	
Return of Sergeant Lapins	Seržanta Lapiņa atgriešanās	Gatis Šmits	Latvia; Sweden	†
Silence Lies	Tromper le silence	Julie Hivon	Canada	††
Sound of Noise		Ola Simonsson; Johannes Stjärne Nilsson	Sweden; France	
State of Violence		Khalo Matabane	Republic of South of Africa; France	
The Albanian	Der Albaner; Shqiptari	Johannes Naber	Germany; Albania	
The Edge	Край; Kray	Alexei Uchitel	Russia	
The Fading Light		Ivan Kavanagh	Ireland	††
The Four Times	Le Quattro Volte	Michelangelo Frammartino	Italy; Germany; Switzerland	
The Last Flight of the Flamingo		João Ribeiro	Portugal; Spain; Italy; France; Mozambique; Brazil	
The Names of Love	Le Nom des gens	Michel Leclerc	France	††
The Sandman and the Lost Sand of Dreams		Sinem Sakaoglu; Jesper Møller	Germany; France	††
The Silence	Das letzte Schweigen	Baran bo Odar	Germany	
The Truce		Svetlana Proskurina	Russia	
The Two Deaths of Quincas Wateryell	Quincas Berro d'Água	Sérgio Machado	Brazil	
Three Minutes. 21:37		Maciej Ślesicki	Poland	††
Tomorrow Will Be Better	Jutro bedzie lepiej	Dorota Kędzierzawska	Poland; Japan	††
Twice a Woman	2 fois une femme	François Delisle	Canada	†
Voice Over	Zad kadar	Svetoslav Ovtcharov	Bulgaria	††
Wasted on the Young		Ben C. Lucas	Australia	
We Believed	Noi credevamo	Mario Martone	Italy; France	††
White White World	Beli, beli svet	Oleg Novkovic	Serbia	
Widows on Thursdays	Las viudas de los jueves	Marcelo Piñeyro	Argentina; Spain	

=== Flash Forward ===
English title	Original title	Director(s)	Production country/countries
Afraid of the Dark (Bruises)	Hai paura del buio	Massimo Coppola	Itali
Children of the Green Dragon	A zöld sárkány gyermekei	Bence Miklauzic	Hungary
Crebinsky		Enrique Otero	Spain
Disenchantments		Andreas Pieper	Germany
Erratum		Marek Lechki	Poland
Juan		Kasper Holten	Denmark
Lou		Belinda Chayko	Australia
Lullaby for Pi		Benoît Philippon	Canada; France
Ollie Kepler’s Expanding Purple World		Viv Fongenie	United Kingdom
Pure	Till det som är vackert (lit. "To that which is beautiful")	Lisa Langseth	Sweden
Rondo		Oliver Van Malderghem	Belgium; France

=== Wide Angle ===
==== Korean Short Film Competition ====
English title	Director(s)	Production country/countries	
Broken Night	Yang Hyo-joo	South Korea	†
Bus	Jang Jae-hyun	South Korea	†
Funny Games	Jung Jee-hyun	South Korea	†
I Hope Your Wife Is Well	Chung Mina	South Korea	†
Inspection of the Memory	Lee Yosup	South Korea	†
Papa’s Lullaby	Kim Hyun-gyung	South Korea	†
Skywhale	Directors: Yu Hye-kyung; Oh Kyung-joo; Oh Seok-kyun; Chet Lee	South Korea	†
Someday	Jang Jin-ho	South Korea	†
Teamwork	Hong Seo-yun	South Korea	†
The Journey	Yim Kyung-dong	South Korea	†
Unfunny Game	Park Jong-chul	South Korea	†
Western Movie	Lee Hyung-suk	South Korea	†

==== Asian Short Film Competition ====
English title	Director(s)	Production country/countries	
Inhalation	Edmund Yeo	Malaysia; Japan	†
Juliet’s Choice	Hou Chi-Jan	Taiwan	†
Living It	David LingWei Li	Singapore	†
Mouth	Zurich Chan	Philippines	†
Transitoriness	Yang Yue	China	†

==== Short Film Showcase ====
English title	Director(s)	Production country/countries	
A Khmer Girl	Adam Pfleghaar	Cambodia; United States	†
A Mind of My Own	Cheng Hao-chuan	Taiwan	††
Audition	Kim Min-kyung	South Korea	
Autumn Man	Jonas Selberg Augusten	Sweden	
Barking Island	Serge Avedikian	France; Turkey	
Doctor, Nurse and the Patient	Angshuman Barkakoty	India	
Florence	Jung Dong-rak	South Korea	
Grave Keeper	Lim Jong-jae	South Korea	†
Incident by a Bank	Ruben Östlund	Sweden	
Missing Person	Thomas Ko	United States	†
P	Rommel Tolentino	Philippines	††
Poet of the Elephant House	Anna Juhlin	Sweden	
Promise of a Spring Day	Ha Yoon-jae	South Korea	
Ten Minutes of Life	Wen Zongji	China	†
The Boy and the Whore	Masaya Matsui	Japan	†
The Kiss	Ashlee Page	Australia	††
The New Tenants	Joachim Back	Denmark; United States	
Viola: The Traveling Rooms of a Little Glant	Shih-Ting Hung	United States; Taiwan	
Waiting	Jow Zhi Wei	Singapore	††

==== Documentary Competition ====
English title	Director(s)	Production country/countries	
Amin	Shahim Parhami	Iran; South Korea; Canada	†
Cheonggyecheon Medley	Kelvin K Park	South Korea	†
Dream Factory	Kim Sung-kyun	South Korea	†
Inshallah, Football	Ashvin Kumar	India	†
Let the Wind Carry Me	Chiang Hsiu Chiung; Kwan Pun Leung	Taiwan	††
Miracle on Jongno Street	Lee Hyuk-sang	South Korea	†
New Castle	Guo Hengqi	China	†
No Name Stars	Kim Tae-il	South Korea	†
Passion	Byamba Sakhya	Mongolia	†
Sweet Nuke	Lee Kang-gil	South Korea	

==== Documentary Showcase ====
English title	Director(s)	Production country/countries	
Anna May Wong: In Her Own Words	Hong Yunah	United States; South Korea	†
Cruel Season	Park Bae-il	South Korea	†
Dancing Dreams	Rainer Hoffman; Anne Linsel	Germany	
Daniel Schmid - Le chat qui pense	Pascal Hofmann; Benny Jaberg	Switzerland	
First Love - 1989, Memory of Sumida	Park Jeong-suk	South Korea	†
I Wish I Knew	Jia Zhangke	China	
Johnnie Got His Gun!	Yves Montmayeur	France; Hong Kong, China	†
Kabuki-za: Final Curtain	Sogawa Sokichi	Japan	†
María and I	Félix Fernández de Castro	Spain	†
Masquerade	Moon Jeong-hyun	South Korea	†
My Perestroika	Robin Hessman	United States; United Kingdom	
My Sweet Baby	Ryu Mi-rye	South Korea	†
One Day Less	Daniela Ludlow	Mexico	
Return to Manila : Filipino Cinema	Hubert Niogret	France; Philippines	†
Through Korean Cinema	Leonardo Cinieri Lombroso	Italy	†
Twinkle Twinkle Little Star	Lin Cheng-sheng	Taiwan	††

==== Animation Showcase ====
English title	Director(s)	Production country/countries	
Cheburashka	Makoto Nakamura	Japan	
Green Days: Dinosaur and I	Han Hye-jin; Ahn Jae-hoon	South Korea	†
The House	Directors: Lee Na-bi; Park Mi-sun; Lee Jae-ho; Park Eun-young; Ban Joo-young	South Korea	†
Time of Eve	Yasuhiro Yoshiura	Japan	††

=== Open Cinema ===
English title	Original title	Director(s)	Production country/countries	
Here Comes the Bride		Chris Martinez	Philippines	††
The Bang Bang Club		Steven Silver	Canada; Republic of South Korea	††
The Butcher, the Chef and the Swordsman	刀见笑; Dao Jian Xiao	Wuershan	China; United States; Hong Kong, China	
The Lightning Tree	雷桜; Raiou	Ryūichi Hiroki	Japan	†
The Passion	La passione	Carlo Mazzacurati	Italy	††
The Sandman and the Lost Sand of Dreams		Sinem Sakaoglu; Jesper Møller	Germany; France	††
Zebraman 2: Attack on Zebra City	ゼブラーマン -ゼブラシティの逆襲- Zeburāman -Zebura Shiti no Gyakushū-	Takashi Miike	Japan	

=== Special Program in Focus ===
==== Kurdish Cinema, The Unconquered Spirit ====
English title	Director(s)	Production country/countries
All My Mothers	Ebrahim Saeedi; Zahavi Sanjavi	Iraq; Iran
Crossing the Dust	Shawkat Amin Korki	Iraq
David the Tolhildan	Mano Khalil	Switzerland
Fratricide	Yılmaz Arslan	Germany; France; Luxembourg
Half Moon	Bahman Ghobadi	Iran
The Children of Diyarbakir	Miraz Bezar	Turkey
Vodka Lemon	Hiner Saleem	Iraq
Yol	Şerif Gören; Yılmaz Güney	Turkey; Switzerland; France

==== Subversive Imagination: The Spanish Masterpiece from Franco Regime ====
English title	Director(s)	Production country/countries
Cria!	Carlos Saura	Spain
Death of a Cyclist	Juan Antonio Bardem	Spain
The Delinquents	Carlos Saura	Spain
The Executioner	Luis García Berlanga	Spain; Italy
The Hunt	Carlos Saura	Spain
The Strange Trip	Fernando Fernán Gómez	Spain
Viridiana	Luis Buñuel	Mexico; Spain

==== Czech Films Now: Cinema of Liberalism ====
English title	Director(s)	Production country/countries	
3 Seasons in Hell	Tomáš Mašín	Czech Republic; Germany; Slovakia	
An Earthy Paradise for the Eyes	Irena Pavlásková	Czech Republic	
Dreamers	Jitka Rudolfova	Czech Republic	††
Katka	Helena Třeštíková	Czech Republic	
Kawasaki's Rose	Jan Hřebejk	Czech Republic	
Walking Too Fast	Radim Špaček	Czech Republic	††

==== A Tribute to Kwak Ji-kyoon: Portrait of Melodrama ====
English title	Director(s)	Production country/countries
Plum Blossom	Kwak Ji-kyoon	South Korea
Portrait of the Days of Youth	Kwak Ji-kyoon	South Korea
Shock Continues Long	Kwak Ji-kyoon	South Korea
Winter Wanderer	Kwak Ji-kyoon	South Korea

=== Midnight Passion ===
English title	Original title	Director(s)	Production country/countries
22 Bullets	L'immortel (lit. "The Immortal")	Richard Berry	France
Altitude		Kaare Andrews	Canada
Dream Home	維多利亞壹號; Wai dor lei ah yut ho (lit. "Victoria No. 1")	Pang Ho-cheung	Hong Kong, China
Easy Money	Snabba cash	Daniel Espinosa	Sweden; Denmark; Germany
Husk		Brett Simmons	United States
I Saw the Devil	악마를 보았다; Angmareul boatda	Kim Jee-woon	South Korea
Julia's Eyes	Los ojos de Julia	Guillem Morales	Spain
Red Hill		Patrick Hughes	Australia
Stalker		Martin Kemp	United Kingdom
The Last Employee	Der letzte Angestellte	Alexander Adolph	Germany
The Reef		Andrew Traucki	Australia
Vanishing on 7th Street		Brad Anderson	United States

=== Closing Film ===
English title	Original title	Director(s)	Production country/countries	
Camellia	카멜리아	Isao Yukisada ("Kamome"); Jang Joon-hwan ("Love for Sale"); Wisit Sasanatieng ("Iron Pussy")	Thailand; Japan; South Korea	†

== Awards ==
- New Currents Award
  - Bleak Night - Yoon Sung-hyun (South Korea)
  - The Journals of Musan - Park Jung-bum (South Korea)
- Flash Forward Award - Pure - Lisa Langseth (Sweden)
  - Special Mention - Erratum - Marek Lechki (Poland)
- BIFF Mecenat Award Asia
  - Miracle on Jongno Street - Lee Hyuk-sang (South Korea)
  - New Castle - Guo Hengqi (China)
- FIPRESCI Award - The Journals of Musan - Park Jung-bum (South Korea)
- NETPAC Award - Dooman River - Zhang Lu (China, South Korea)
- KNN Award - My Spectacular Theatre - Lu Yang (China)
