= 9th Asia Pacific Screen Awards =

Edition of award ceremony

- Date: 26 November 2015
- Site: Brisbane; Australia

Highlights
- Best Film: Cemetery of Splendour
- Best Actor: Jung Jae-young
- Best Actress: Kirin Kiki

The 9th Asia Pacific Screen Awards were held in Brisbane, Australia on 26 November 2015.

== Awards ==
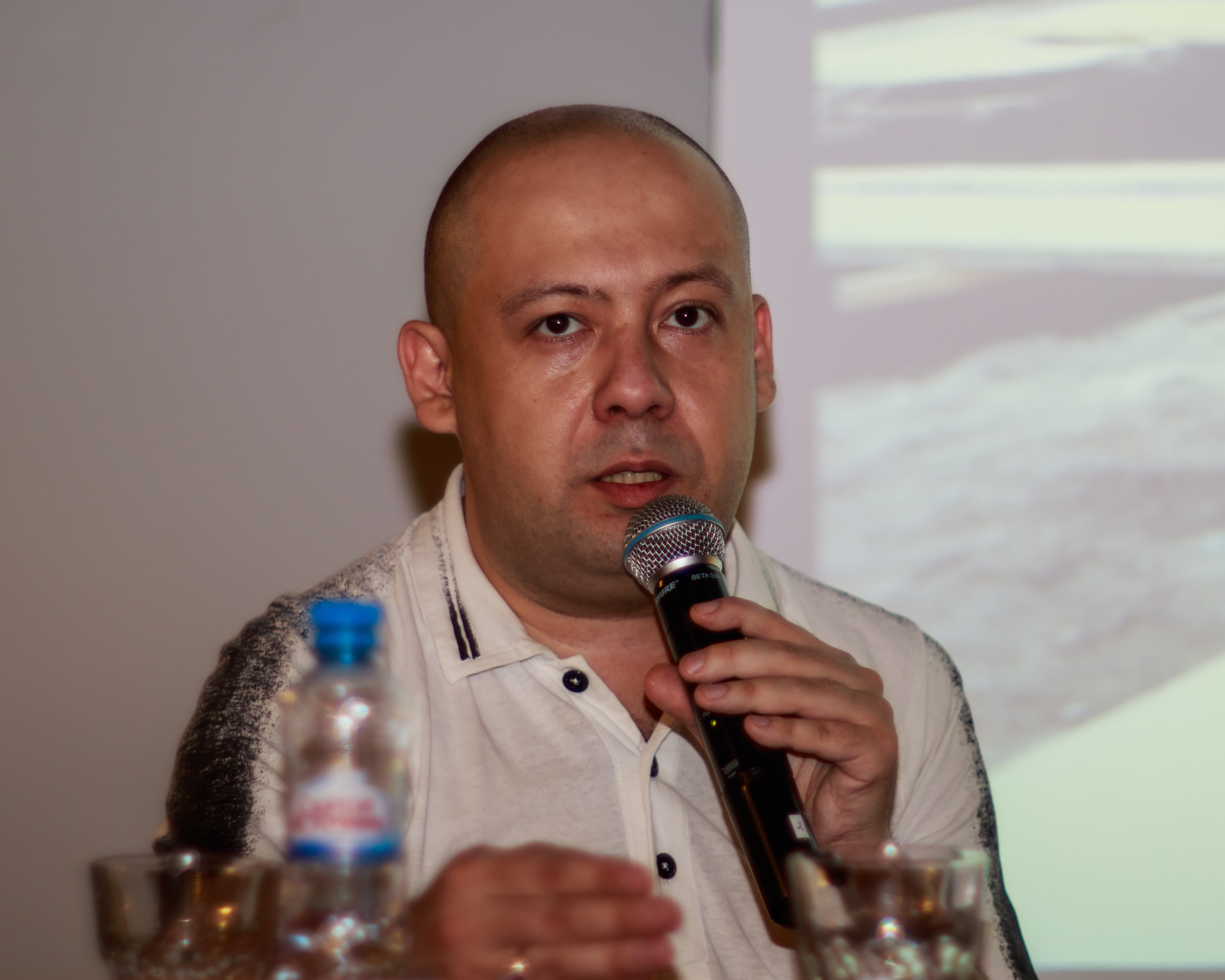
Aleksei Alekseivich German, Achievement in Directing winner.

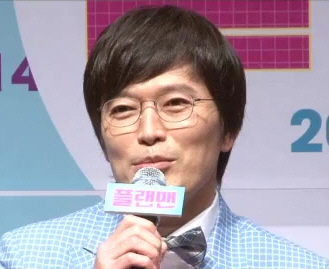
Jung Jae-young, Best Actor winner.

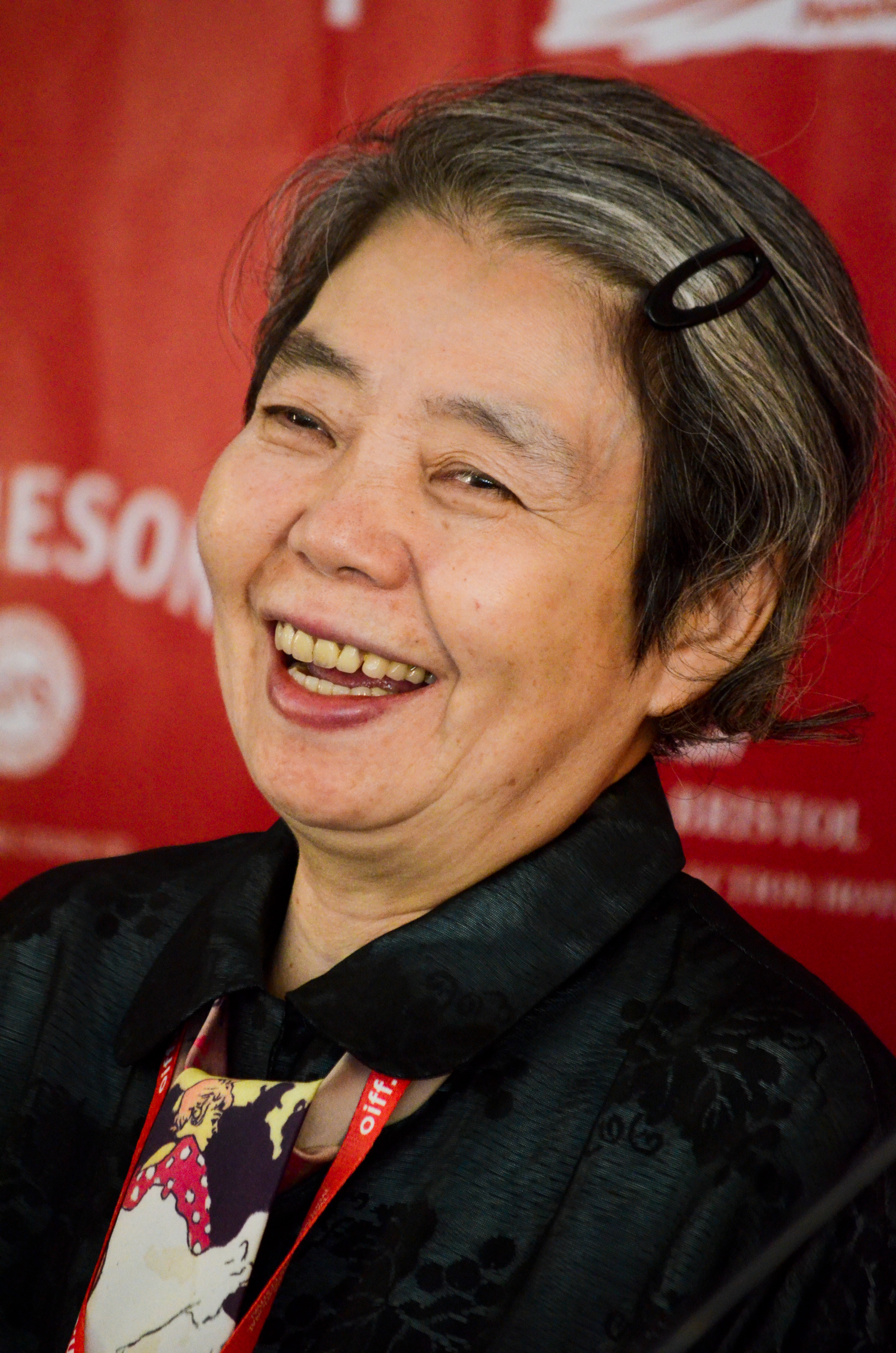
Kirin Kiki, Best Actress winner.

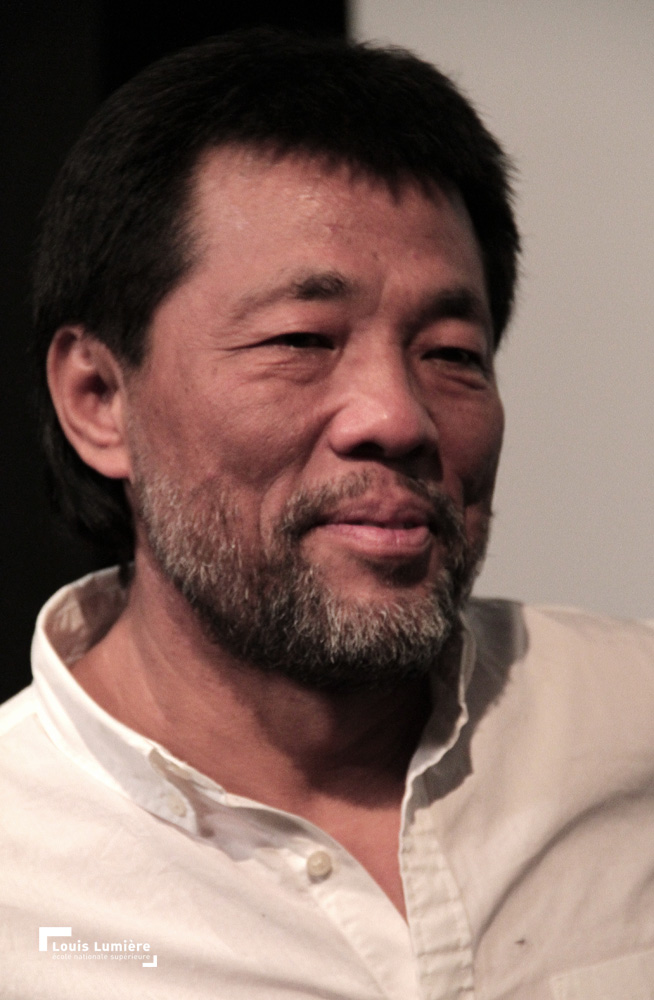
Mark Lee Ping Bin, Best Cinematography winner.

Best Feature Film	Achievement in Directing
(Thailand) Cemetery of Splendour: (South Korea) End of Winter; (Japan) Journey to the Shore; (Taiwan) The Assassin	(Russia) Aleksei Alekseivich German - Under Electric Clouds: (Thailand) Apichatpong Weerasethakul - Cemetery of Splendour; (Kazakhstan) Ermek Tursunov - Stranger; (Taiwan) Hou Hsiao-hsien - The Assassin; (South Korea) Park Jung-bum - Alive
Best Actor	Best Actress
(South Korea) Jung Jae-young - Right Now, Wrong Then: (Australia) Reef Ireland - Downriver; (Russia) Aleksei Guskov - The Find; (Georgia (country)) Misha Gomiashvili - The President; (China) Shide Nyima - Tharlo	(Japan) Kirin Kiki - Sweet Bean: (Iran) Fatemeh Motamed-Arya - Avalanche; (Philippines) Shamaine Buencamino - Lorna; (Russia) Evgeniya Mandzhieva - The Gulls; (South Korea) Lee Young-ran - End of Winter
Best Screenplay	Best Cinematography
(Turkey) Senem Tüzen - Motherland: (Turkey) Emin Alper - Frenzy; (Sri Lanka) Vimukthi Jayasundara - Dark in the White Light; (Kazakhstan) Kenzhebek Shaikakov - Tent; (China) Xin Yukun, Feng Yuanliang - The Coffin in the Mountain	(Taiwan) Mark Lee Ping Bin - The Assassin: (India) Jean-Marc Ferriére - Sunrise; (China) Miaoyan Zhang - A Corner of Heaven; (China) Songye Lu - Tharlo; (Kazakhstan) Murat Aliyev - Stranger
Best Animated Feature Film	Best Documentary Feature Film
(Japan) Miss Hokusai: (Japan) When Marnie Was There; (Russia) The Snow Queen 2: The Snow King; (South Korea) The Road Called Life; (Australia) Blinky Bill the Movie	(China) The Chinese Mayor: (Indonesia) The Look of Silence; (Iraq) A Flag without a Country; (Australia) Another Country; (Pakistan) Among the Believers
Best Youth Feature Film	UNESCO Award
(China) River: (South Korea) Set Me Free; (Turkey) Mustang; (Afghanistan) Mina Walking; (China) A Corner of Heaven	(Palestine) The Idol: (China) A Corner of Heaven; (Australia) Spear; (Turkey) Motherland; (Russia) The Gulls
FIAPF Award	NETPAC Award
(Egypt) Esaad Younis	(Kyrgyzstan) Heavenly Nomadic

=== Films and countries with multiple nominations ===
Films that received multiple nominations
Nominations	Film
3	A Corner of Heaven
3	The Assassin
2	Cemetery of Splendour
2	End of Winter
2	Motherland
2	Stranger
2	Tharlo
2	The Gulls

Countries that received multiple nominations
Awards	Country
8	China
6	South Korea
5	Russia
4	Australia
4	Japan
4	Turkey
3	Kazakhstan
3	Taiwan
2	Thailand
