= 6th Asia Pacific Screen Awards =

- Date: Late 2012
- Site: Queensland; Australia

Highlights
- Best Film: Beyond the Hill
- Best Actor: Choi Min-sik
- Best Actress: Nora Aunor

The 6th Asia Pacific Screen Awards were held in Queensland, Australia some time in late 2012.

== Awards ==
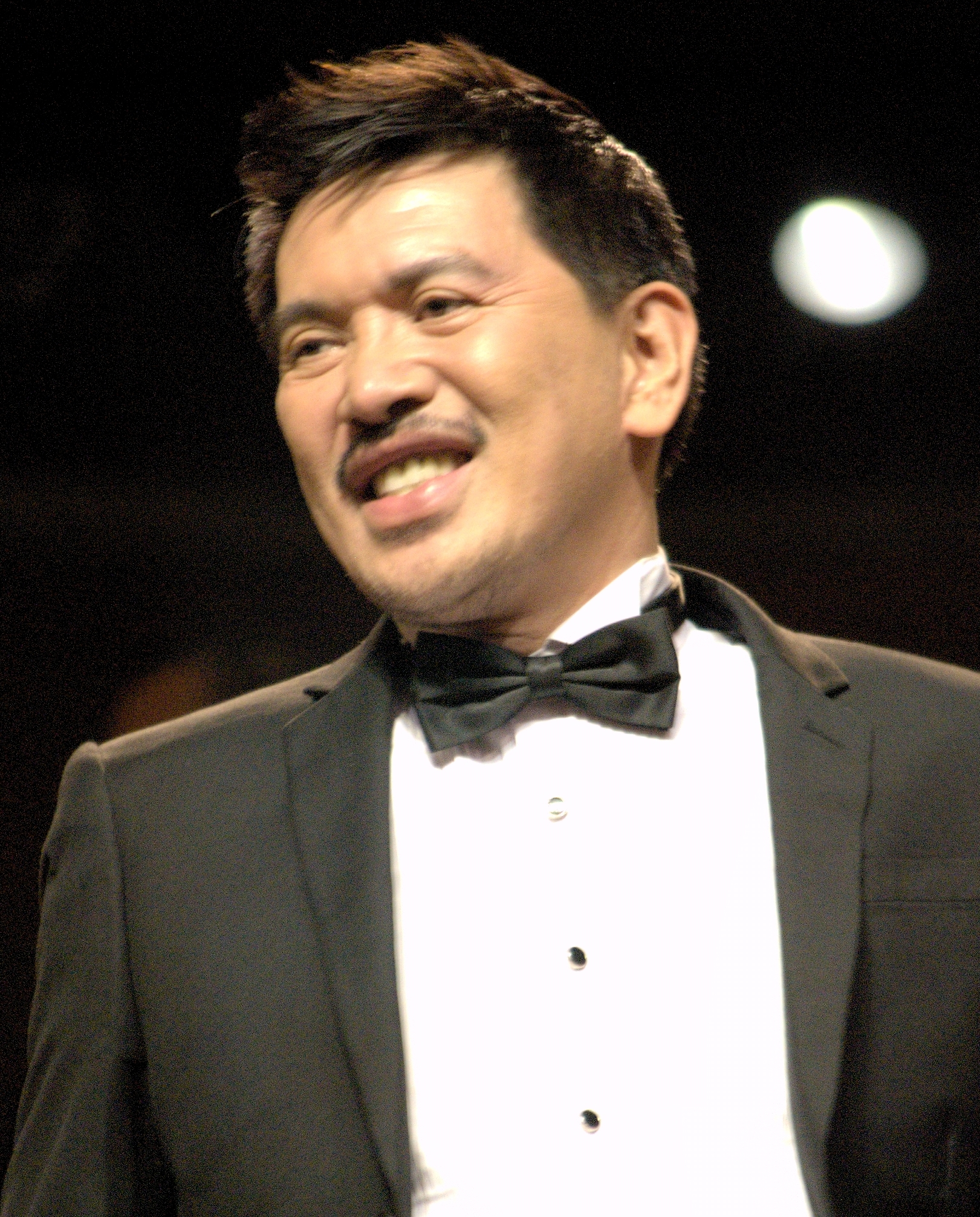
Brillante Mendoza, Achievement in Directing winner.

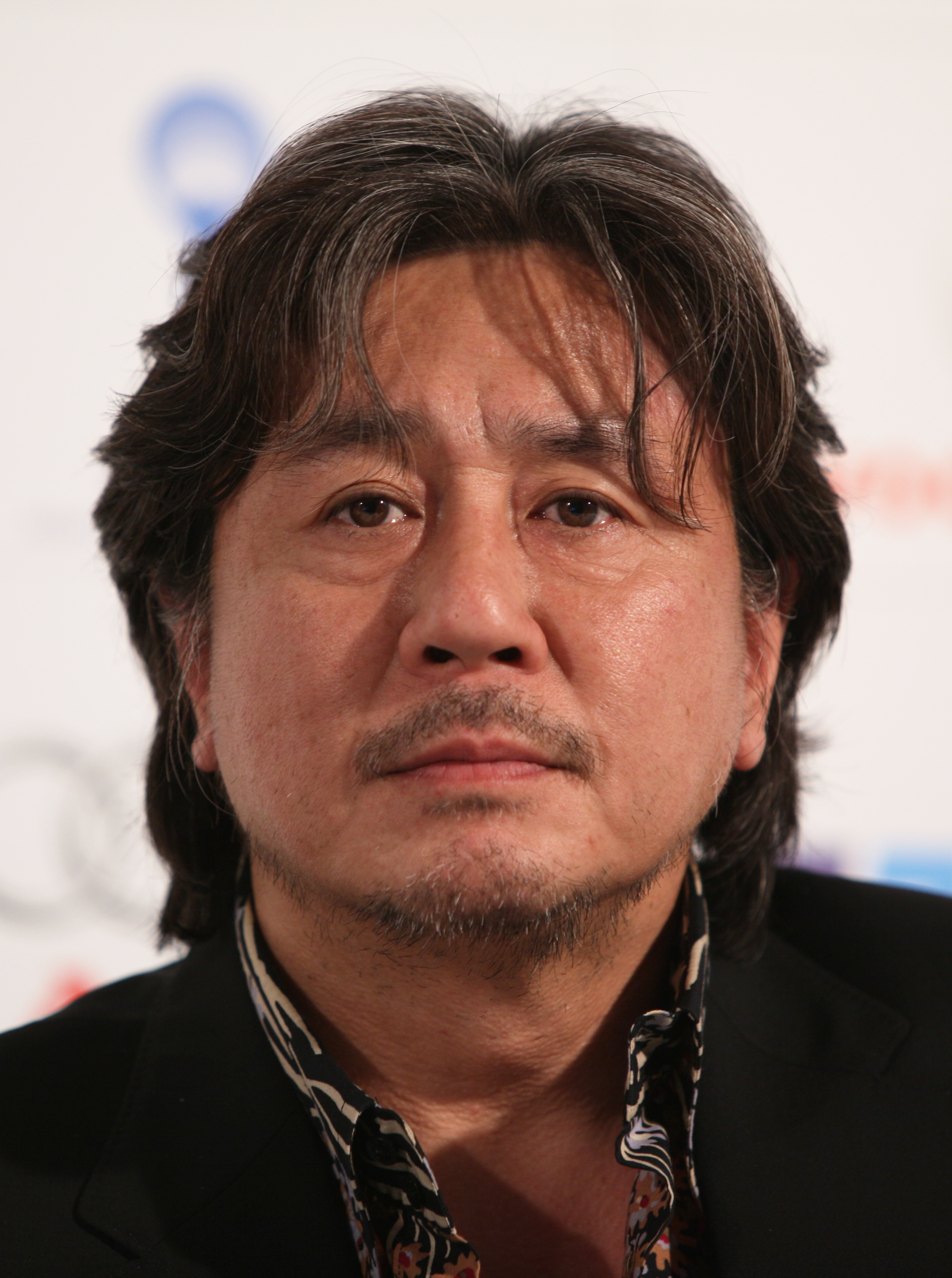
Choi Min-sik, Best Actor winner.

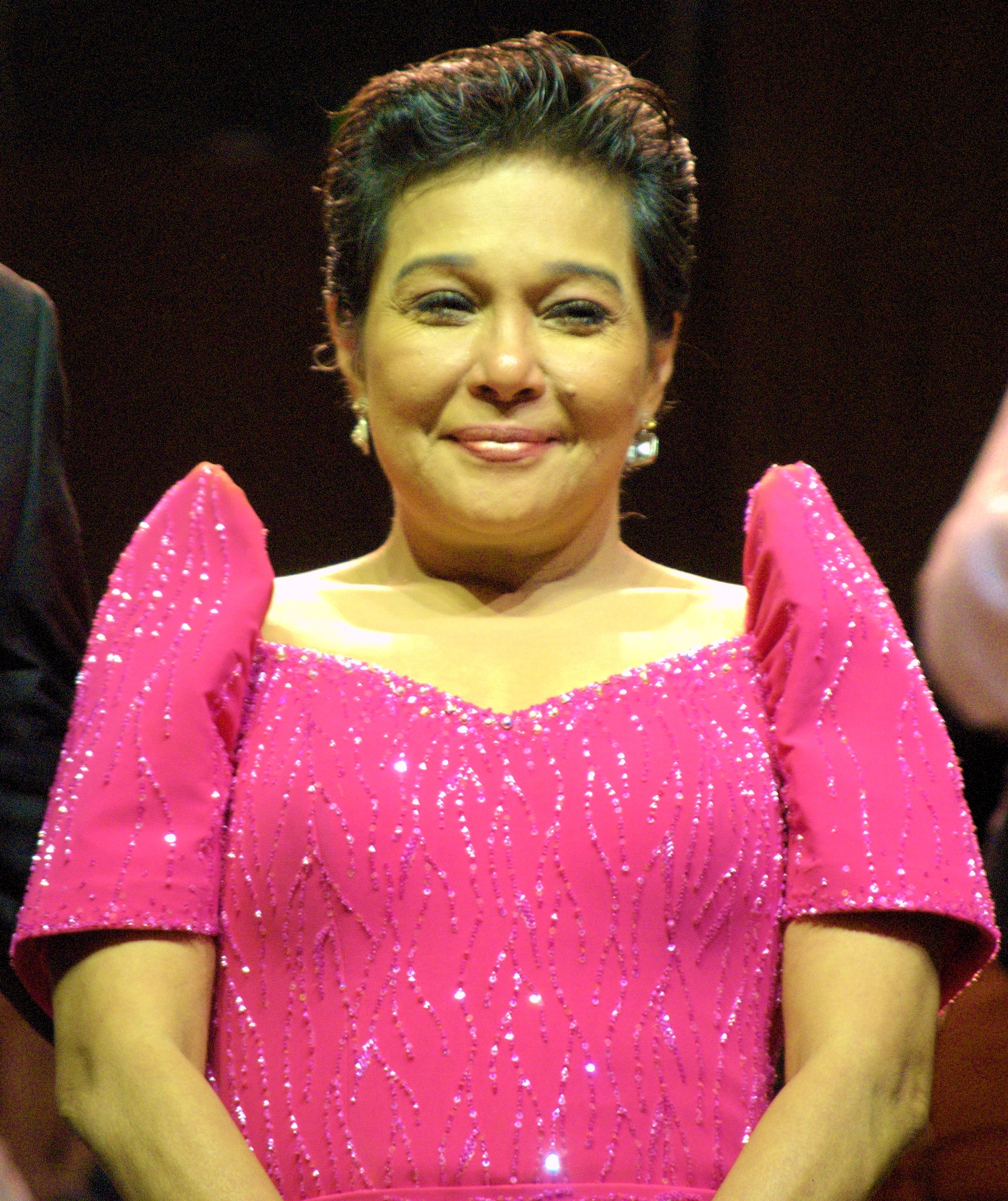
Nora Aunor, Best Actress winner.

Best Feature Film	Achievement in Directing
(Turkey) Beyond the Hill: (Hong Kong) Dragon; (South Korea) Nameless Gangster: Rules of the Time; (Russia) The Horde; (Iran) The Bear	(Philippines) Brillante Mendoza - Thy Womb: (Turkey) Reis Çelik - Night of Silence; (Iran) Khosro Masumi - The Bear; (China) Cheng Er - Lethal Hostage
Best Actor	Best Actress
(South Korea) Choi Min-sik - Nameless Gangster: Rules of the Time: (India) Manoj Bajpayee - Gangs of Wasseypur; (Turkey) Tamer Levent - Beyond the Hill; (China) Wu Tianming - Full Circle; (Israel) Lior Ashkenazi - Footnote	(Philippines) Nora Aunor - Thy Womb: (India) Vidya Balan - The Dirty Picture; (Russia) Darya Ekamasova - Once Upon a Time There Lived a Simple Woman; (Pakistan) Humaima Malick - Bol
Best Screenplay	Best Cinematography
(Turkey) Reis Çelik - Night of Silence: (China) Cheng Er - Lethal Hostage; (Turkey) Emin Alper - Beyond the Hill; (Pakistan) Shoaib Mansoor - Bol; (Philippines) Chris Martinez - The Woman in the Septic Tank	(Iran) Touraj Aslani - Rhino Season: (Malaysia) Jarin Pengpanich - Bunohan; (Taiwan) Chin Ting-chang - Seediq Bale; (Hong Kong) Jake Pollock, Lai Yiu-fai - Dragon; (Russia) Yury Raysky - The Horde
Best Animated Feature Film	Best Documentary Feature Film
(Japan) A Letter to Momo: (Japan) Wolf Children; (Japan) Rainbow Fireflies; (Australia) Happy Feet Two; (Japan) From Up on Poppy Hill	(Iraq) In My Mother's Arms: (Indonesia) The Land Beneath the Fog; (Israel) The Law in These Parts; (South Korea) Planet of Snail; (Palestine) 5 Broken Cameras
Best Youth Feature Film	UNESCO Award
(Indonesia) The Mirror Never Lies: (Japan) I Wish; (Israel) My Australia; (Israel) Off White Lies; (India) Gattu	(Taiwan) Seediq Bale
FIAPF Award	Jury Grand Prize
(Japan) Ryuichi Sakamoto	(India) Anurag Kashyap - Gangs of Wasseypur (South Korea) Jo Min-su - Pietà

=== Films and countries with multiple nominations ===
Films that received multiple nominations
Nominations	Film
3	Beyond the Hill
2	Bol
2	Dragon
2	Gangs of Wasseypur
2	Lethal Hostage
2	Nameless Gangster: Rules of the Time
2	Night of Silence
2	The Bear
2	The Horde
2	Thy Womb
2	Seediq Bale

Countries that received multiple nominations
Awards	Country
5	Japan
5	Turkey
4	India
4	Israel
4	South Korea
3	China
3	Iran
3	Philippines
3	Russia
2	Hong Kong
2	Indonesia
2	Pakistan
2	Taiwan
