= Asia Pacific Screen Award for Best Screenplay =

The winners and nominees of the Asia Pacific Screen Award for Best Screenplay

== 2000s ==
Year	Winner and nominees	English title	Original title
2007	(India) Feroz Abbas Khan	Gandhi, My Father	
2007	(Australia) Michael James Rowland, Helen Barnes	Lucky Miles	
2007	(Iran) Kiumars Pourahmad, Habib Ahmadzadeh	The Night Bus	Autobus-E Shab
2007	(South Korea) Lee Chang-dong	Secret Sunshine	Miryang
2007	(Turkey) Önder Çakar	Takva: A Man's Fear of God	Takva
2008	(Israel) (France) (Germany) Eran Riklis, Suha Arraf	Lemon Tree	Etz Halimon
2008	(Iran) Behnam Behzadi	Before the Burial	Tanha Do Bar Zendegui Mikonim
2008	(Turkey) Derviş Zaim	Dot	Nokta
2008	(Korea) Hong Sang-soo	Night and Day	Bamgua Nat
2008	(Japan) (Netherlands) (Hong Kong) Max Mannix, Kiyoshi Kurosawa and Sachiko Tanaka	Tokyo Sonata	
2009	(Iran) Asghar Farhadi	About Elly	Darbareye Elly
2009	(South Korea) Baek Seung-bin	Members of the Funeral	Jang-rye-sik-ui Member
2009	(Japan) Kundō Koyama	Departures	Okuribito
2009	(South Korea) Bong Joon-ho, Park Eun-kyo	Mother	Madeo
2009	(India) Yogesh Vinayak Joshi, Upendra Sidhaye	Mumbai my Life	Mumbai Meri Jaan

== 2010s ==
Year	Winner and nominees	English title	Original title
2010	(Israel) Samuel Maoz	Lebanon	
2010	(Israel) Nir Bergman	Intimate Grammar	Ha’dikduk ha’pnimi
2010	(South Korea) Lee Chang-dong	Poetry	Shi
2010	(Japan) (Japan) Hisako Kurosawa, Deru Deguchi	Caterpillar	
2010	(China) Su Xiaowei	Aftershock	
2011	(Russia) Aleksey Fedorchenko	Silent Souls	
2011	(South Korea) Yoon Sung-hyun	Bleak Night	Pa-soo-kkoon
2011	(Turkey) (Turkey) (Turkey) Nuri Bilge Ceylan, Ercan Kesal, Ebru Ceylan	Once Upon a Time in Anatolia	Bir Zamanlar Anadolu'da
2011	(Iran) Asghar Farhadi	A Separation	Jodái-e Náder az Simin
2011	(Russia) Aleksei Balabanov	The Stoker	Kochegar
2012	(Turkey) Reis Çelik	Night of Silence	Lal Gece
2012	(Turkey) Emin Alper	Beyond the Hill	Tepenin Ardi
2012	(Pakistan) Shoaib Mansoor	Bol	
2012	(China) Cheng Er	Lethal Hostage	
2012	(Philippines) Chris Martinez	The Woman in the Septic Tank	Ang Babae sa Septic Tank
2013	(India) Ritesh Batra	The Lunchbox	
2013	(Malaysia) U-Wei Haji Saari	Almayer's Folly	
2013	(Russia) Denis Osokin	Celestial Wives of the Meadow Mari	Nebesnye zheny lugovykh mari
2013	(Iran) Asghar Farhadi	The Past	Le Passé
2013	(India) (India) Mostofa Sarwar Farooki, Anisul Hoque	Television	
2014	(Iran) Nima Javidi	Melbourne	
2014	(Sri Lanka) Prasanna Jayakody	28	
2014	(Russia) (Russia) (Russia) Alexey Fedorchenko, Denis Osokin, Oleg Loyevsky	Angels of Revolution	Angely Revolucii
2014	(Philippines) Giancarlo Abrahan	Sparks	
2015	(Turkey) Senem Tüzen	Motherland (Ana Yurdu)	Ana Yurdu
2015	(China) (China) Xin Yukun, Feng Yuanliang	The Coffin In The Mountain	Xin Migong
2015	(Sri Lanka) Vimukthi Jayasundara	Dark In The White Light	Sulanga Gini Aran
2015	(Kazakhstan) Kenzhebek Shaikako	Tent	Kurko
2016	(Japan) (Japan) (Japan) Ryusuke Hamaguchi, Tadashi Nohara, Tomoyuki Takahashi	Happy Hour	
2016	(China) Yang Chao	Crosscurrent	
2016	(Iran) Mehran Kashani	Daughter	Dokhtar
2016	(India) (India) Gurvinder Singh, Waryam Singh Sandhu	The Fourth Direction	Chauthi Koot
2016	(India) (India) Leena Yadav, Supratik Sen	Parched	
2017	(India) (India) Amit V Masurkar, Mayank Tewari	Newton	
2017	(Russia) (Germany) Boris Khlebnikov, Natalia Meshchaninova	Arrhythmia	Aritmiya
2017	(Kyrgyzstan) (Kazakhstan) Dastan Zhapar Uulu, Bakyt Mukul	A Father's Will	Atanyn Kereezi
2017	(Australia) (Australia) David Tranter, Steven McGregor	Sweet Country	
2017	(Japan) Kore-eda Hirokazu	The Third Murder	Sandome no Satsujin
2018	(United States) (Israel) (Palestine) Dan Kleinman, Sameh Zoabi	Tel Aviv on Fire	
2018	(Iran) Payman Maadi	Bomb, A Love Story	
2018	(South Korea) (South Korea) Oh Jung-mi, Lee Chang-dong	Burning	
2018	(Kazakhstan) (Netherlands) Adilkhan Yerzhanov, Roelof Jan Minneboo	The Gentle Indifference of the World	
2018	(Japan) Kore-eda Hirokazu	Shoplifters	
2019	(Russia) Kantemir Balagov, Aleksandr Terekhov	Beanpole	Дылда
2019	(China) Pema Tseden	Balloon	气球
2019	(Iran) Mohsen Gharaie, Mohammad Davoudi	Castle of Dreams	
2019	(Georgia (country)) Tamar Shavgulidze	Comets	
2019	(China) A Mei, Wang Xiaoshua	So Long, My Son	地久天长
