= Alive (2014 film) =

- Theatrical poster
- Hangul: 산다
- RR: Sanda
- MR: Sanda
- Directed by: Park Jung-bum
- Written by: Park Jung-bum; Yoo Bo-ra
- Produced by: Lee Sang-yong
- Starring: Park Jung-bum; Lee Seung-yeon
- Cinematography: Kim Jong-seon
- Edited by: Cho Hyun-joo
- Music by: Park In-young
- Production company: Secondwind Film
- Release dates: May 4, 2014 (JIFF); May 21, 2015 (South Korea)
- Running time: 166 minutes
- Country: South Korea
- Language: Korean
- Box office: US$29,134

Alive (Korean: 산다) is a 2014 South Korean drama film starring Park Jung-bum and Lee Seung-yeon. Written and directed by Park, it tells the story of a broke laborer's struggle for survival.

After his friend's suicide, Park was troubled and started asking questions, such as why he was unable to help his friend and how he can help himself as he also has panic disorder. He concluded that humans should save humans. Although everyone may look like they're leading different lives, finding hope within everything is what he wanted his film to focus on.

It made its world premiere as one of the feature-length films for Jeonju Digital Project at the Jeonju International Film Festival in 2014. Since then, the film had a good start in the film festival scene, winning the Young Critics Award at the 67th Locarno International Film Festival, followed by a double crown for the Silver Astor for Best Actor Award and Obra Cine Award for Best First or Second Feature at the 29th Mar del Plata International Film Festival, a special mention at the 25th Singapore International Film Festival along with numerous other international film festival invites.

== Plot ==
Jung-chul, a laborer, toils away on a soybean paste factory as he tries to look after his dysfunctional family.

== Cast ==
- Park Jung-bum as Jung-chul
- Lee Seung-yeon as Soo-yeon
- Park Myung-hoon as Myung-hoon
- Shin Haet-bit as Ha-na
- Park Hee-von as Hyun-kyung
- Lee Na-ra as Jin-young

== Production ==
Filming starts in December 2011 in a small town in the mountainous Gangwon Province of Korea, where Park Jung-bum's parents live and run a small soybean paste factory, which acts as the main location for the film.

== Awards and nominations ==
| Year | Award | Category | Recipient | Result |
|---|---|---|---|---|
| 2014 | 67th Locarno International Film Festival | Young Critics Award | Alive | Won |
| 2014 | 29th Mar del Plata International Film Festival | Silver Astor for Best Actor | Park Jung-bum | Won |
| 2014 | 29th Mar del Plata International Film Festival | Obra Cine Award for Best First or Second Feature | Alive | Won |
| 2014 | 25th Singapore International Film Festival | Silver Screen Awards for Asian Feature Film - Special Mention | Alive | Won |
| 2015 | 24th Buil Film Awards | Best Actor | Park Jung-bum | Nominated |
| 2015 | 9th Asia Pacific Screen Awards | Best Feature Film | Alive | Nominated |
| 2015 | 9th Asia Pacific Screen Awards | Achievement In Directing | Park Jung-bum | Nominated |
| 2015 | 9th Asia Pacific Screen Awards | Jury Grand Prize | Park Jung-bum | Won |
| 2016 | 3rd Wildflower Film Awards | Grand Prize | Alive | Won |
| 2016 | 3rd Wildflower Film Awards | Best Director (Narrative Films) | Park Jung-bum | Nominated |
| 2016 | 3rd Wildflower Film Awards | Best Actor | Park Jung-bum | Nominated |
| 2016 | 3rd Wildflower Film Awards | Best Screenplay | Park Jung-bum | Nominated |
