= Cemetery of Splendour =

2015 film by Apichatpong Weerasethakul

- Film poster
- Thai: รักที่ขอนแก่น
- Directed by: Apichatpong Weerasethakul
- Written by: Apichatpong Weerasethakul
- Produced by: Apichatpong Weerasethakul; Keith Griffiths; Simon Field; Charles de Meaux; Michael Weber; Hans W. Geißendörfer
- Starring: Jenjira Pongpas Widner; Banlop Lomnoi; Jarinpattra Rueangram
- Cinematography: Diego García
- Edited by: Lee Chatametikool
- Production companies: Kick the Machine Films; Illuminations Films (Past Lives)
- Release date: 18 May 2015 (Cannes)
- Running time: 122 minutes
- Countries: Thailand; France; United Kingdom; Mexico; Germany; Norway
- Language: Thai
- Box office: $83,250

Cemetery of Splendour (Thai: รักที่ขอนแก่น, RTGS: Rak Ti Khon Kaen, lit. 'Love in Khon Kaen') is a 2015 drama film written, produced, and directed by Apichatpong Weerasethakul. The plot revolves around a spreading epidemic of sleeping sickness where spirits appear to the stricken and hallucination becomes indistinguishable from reality. The epidemic is a metaphor for personal and Thai social issues. The film premiered in the Un Certain Regard section at the 2015 Cannes Film Festival to critical acclaim. It’s an international co-production film between Thailand, France, the United Kingdom, Mexico, Germany and Norway.

== Plot ==
Soldiers suffering from a mysterious sleeping sickness are transferred to a temporary clinic set up in a former school. The memory-filled space becomes a revelatory world for housewife and volunteer Jen as she watches over Itt, a handsome soldier with no family visitors. Jen befriends young medium Keng, who uses her psychic powers to help loved ones communicate with the comatose soldiers. Doctors explore various methods, including colored light therapy, to ease the soldiers' troubled dreams. Jen discovers Itt's cryptic notebook of strange writings and blueprint sketches. There may be a connection between the soldiers' enigmatic syndrome and a mythic ancient site beneath the clinic. Magic, healing, romance and dreams are all part of Jen's path to a deeper awareness of herself and the world around her.

== Cast ==
- Banlop Lomnoi as Itt
- Jenjira Pongpas as Jenjira
- Jarinpattra Rueangram as Keng
- Petcharat Chaiburi as Nurse Tet

== Release ==
Cemetery of Splendour premiered at the 2015 Cannes Film Festival in the Un Certain Regard section.

== Reception ==
=== Critical response ===
On Rotten Tomatoes, the film holds a 97% approval rating based on 71 reviews, with an average rating of 8/10. The site's consensus reads, "Cemetery of Splendour gracefully eludes efforts to pin down its meaning while offering patient viewers another gently hypnotic wonder from writer/director Apichatpong Weerasethakul." On Metacritic, the film has a weighted average score of 87 out of 100 based on 17 reviews, indicating "universal acclaim".

=== Year-end lists ===
Cemetery of Splendour was ranked 5th in the Sight & Sound 20 best films of 2015, and 2nd in the Cahiers du Cinéma's 2015 Top Ten chart.

=== Accolades ===
List of accolades
Award / Film festival	Category	Recipient(s)	Result
Asia Pacific Screen Awards	Best Film	Apichatpong Weerasethakul	Won
Asia Pacific Screen Awards	Achievement in Directing	Apichatpong Weerasethakul	Nominated
2015 Cannes Film Festival	Un Certain Regard Award	Apichatpong Weerasethakul	Nominated
2016 International Cinephile Society Awards	ICS Award	Apichatpong Weerasethakul	Won
2015 London Film Festival	Best Film	Apichatpong Weerasethakul	Nominated
Online Film Critics Society Awards 2015	Best Non-U.S. Release	Apichatpong Weerasethakul	Won
2015 Pancevo Film Festival	Lighthouse Award	Apichatpong Weerasethakul	Won
2015 Catalan International Film Festival	Best Motion Picture	Apichatpong Weerasethakul	Nominated
