= Kang Eun-jin =

South Korean actress (born 1982)

- Born: September 16, 1982 (age 44); South Korea
- Occupation: Actress

Korean name
- Hangul: 강은진
- RR: Gang Eunjin
- MR: Kang Ŭnjin

Kang Eun-jin (Korean: 강은진; born September 16, 1982) is a South Korean actress.

== Filmography ==
Year	Title	Role
2005	King and the Clown	Court lady 1
2009	Lifting King Kong	Female at broadcasting company
2010	Poetry	Nurse
2011	The Journals of Musan	Young-sook
2011	Boy	Female employee at insurance company
2011	We Wish to Reincarnate in Paradise	Novelist 1 riding on boat
2011	War of the Arrows	Eun-yi
2012	Pietà	Myeong-ja
2013	Red Family	Chang-soo's mother

== Awards and nominations ==
Year	Award	Category	Nominated work	Result
2012	49th Grand Bell Awards	Best Supporting Actress	Pietà	Nominated
2012	49th Grand Bell Awards	Best New Actress	Pietà	Nominated
