= Bleak Night =

2010 South Korean coming-of-age psychological drama film by Yoon Sung-Hyun

- South Korean poster
- Hangul: 파수꾼
- Hanja: 把守꾼
- Lit.: The Lookout
- RR: Pasukkun
- MR: P'asukkun
- Directed by: Yoon Sung-hyun
- Written by: Yoon Sung-hyun
- Produced by: Yoon Sung-hyun; Kim Seung-june; Park Ki-yong; Jang Hyun-soo
- Starring: Lee Je-hoon; Seo Jun-young; Park Jeong-min; Jo Sung-ha
- Cinematography: Byeon Bong-seon
- Edited by: Yoon Sung-hyun
- Music by: Park Min-joon
- Production company: KAFA Films
- Distributed by: Filament Pictures; CJ Entertainment
- Release dates: October 9, 2010 (BIFF); March 3, 2011 (South Korea)
- Running time: 116 minutes
- Country: South Korea
- Language: Korean
- Box office: US$143,437

Bleak Night (Korean: 파수꾼; RR: Pasukkun; lit. 'The Lookout') is a 2010 South Korean coming-of-age psychological drama film written and directed by Yoon Sung-Hyun. The film is about a father's search for answers following his son's death, and the shifting dynamics at play among three high-school friends. A Korean Academy of Film Arts graduation project by Yoon Sung-hyun, it received rave reviews and won several Best New Actor awards for Lee Je-hoon, as well as Best New Director for Yoon at the Grand Bell Awards and Busan Film Critics Awards.

== Plot ==
Still mystified by his son's death, the father (Jo Sung-ha) of high school student Ki-tae (Lee Je-hoon) tries to track down his two best friends, classmates Hee-joon (Park Jeong-min) and Dong-yoon (Seo Jun-young), to try to find an explanation. Through Ki-tae's classmate Jae-ho, the father meets Hee-joon, who says he cannot help as he moved schools "weeks before what happened to Ki-tae." Afterwards, Hee-joon berates Jae-ho for giving his phone number to Ki-tae's father but Jae-ho tells him that Ki-tae "went crazy" after he moved away. Hee-joon manages to trace Dong-yoon and urges him to contact Ki-tae's father and provide some answers. In parallel, flashbacks to the time gradually reveal what really happened, starting with Ki-tae's needling and bullying of Hee-joon and the latter's response.

== Cast ==
- Lee Je-hoon as Ki-tae
- Seo Jun-young as Dong-yoon
- Park Jeong-min as Baek Hee-joon ("Becky")
- Jo Sung-ha as Ki-tae's father
- Bae Jae-ki as Jae-ho
- Lee Cho-hee as Se-jung, girlfriend of Dong-yoon

== Awards and nominations ==
Year	Award	Category	Recipients	Result	Ref.
2010	15th Busan International Film Festival	New Currents Award	Bleak Night	Won	
2011	20th Buil Film Awards	Best New Actor	Park Jeong-min	Nominated	
2011	20th Buil Film Awards	Best New Actor	Seo Jun-young	Nominated	
2011	20th Buil Film Awards	Best New Director	Yoon Sung-hyun	Nominated	
2011	20th Buil Film Awards	Best Screenplay	Yoon Sung-hyun	Nominated	
2011	35th Hong Kong International Film Festival	FIPRESCI Prize	Bleak Night	Won	
2011	35th Hong Kong International Film Festival	SIGNIS Award	Bleak Night	Nominated	
2011	40th International Film Festival Rotterdam	Tiger Award	Bleak Night	Nominated	
2011	48th Grand Bell Awards	Best New Director	Yoon Sung-hyun	Won	
2011	48th Grand Bell Awards	Best New Actor	Lee Je-hoon	Won	
2011	32nd Blue Dragon Film Awards	Best New Actor	Lee Je-hoon	Won	
2011	32nd Blue Dragon Film Awards	Best New Actor	Seo Jun-young	Nominated	
2011	32nd Blue Dragon Film Awards	Best New Director	Yoon Sung-hyun	Won	
2011	12th Busan Film Critics Awards	Best New Director	Yoon Sung-hyun	Won	
2011	5th Asia Pacific Screen Awards	Best Screenplay	Yoon Sung-hyun	Nominated	
2011	21st Black Movie Festival	Young Adults Jury Awards	Yoon Sung-hyun	Won	
2011	Cine 21 Awards	Best New Director	Yoon Sung-hyun	Won	
2011	Cine 21 Awards	Best New Actor	Lee Je-hoon	Won	
2011	19th Korean Culture and Entertainment Awards	Best New Actor	Lee Je-hoon	Won	
2012	3rd KOFRA Film Awards	Best New Actor	Lee Je-hoon	Won	
