= Fly with the Crane =

2012 Chinese film written and directed by Li Ruijun

- Film poster
- Chinese: 告訴他們，我乘白鶴去了
- Hanyu Pinyin: gào su tā men, wǒ chéng bái hè qù le
- Directed by: Li Ruijun
- Screenplay by: Li Ruijun
- Story by: Su Tong
- Based on: Tell Them I've Gone with the White Crane by Su Tong
- Produced by: Yang Cheng; Li Ruijun; Shen Xiaoping
- Starring: Ma Xingchun; Tang Long
- Cinematography: Yang Jin
- Edited by: Li Ruijun
- Music by: Xiao He
- Release date: 5 September 2012 (Venice International Film Festival)
- Running time: 99 minutes
- Country: China
- Language: Mandarin

Fly with the Crane (Chinese: 告訴他們，我乘白鶴去了; pinyin: gào su tā men, wǒ chéng bái hè qù le) is a 2012 Chinese drama film written and directed by Li Ruijun and adapted from the novel Tell Them I've Gone with the White Crane, by Su Tong. It made its premiere at the 69th Venice International Film Festival, in 2012.

== Synopsis ==
Old Ma, a 73-year-old carpenter, used to make and paint coffins. Believing that a person's spirit can only be preserved after death through burial, he plans to make a romantic ending of his life and longs to be taken to heaven by a white crane.

Following the implementation of mandatory cremation by the Chinese authorities, Old Ma feels hopeless, until one day, his grandchildren map out an extraordinary plan to set him free.

== Cast ==
- Ma Xingchun as Old Ma
- Tang Long as Zhi
- Wang Siyi as Miaomiao
- Zhang Min as Ma Chunhua, Old Ma's daughter
- Wu Renlin as Zhi's father
- Wang Cailan as Zhi's mother
- Wang Zhihang as Jun
- Wang Dazhi as Old Cao
- Li Shengjun as Old Cao's son

== Production ==
The cast of Fly with the Crane consists entirely of Li's family members and friends.

== Awards and nominations ==
Year	Award	Category	Recipient	Result
2013	20th Beijing College Student Film Festival	Artistic Exploration Award	Fly with the Crane	Won
2013	46th Brasilia Film Festival	Best Director	Li Ruijun	Won
2014	4th Golden Koala Chinese Film Festival	Best Actor	Ma Xingchun	Won
2014	4th Golden Koala Chinese Film Festival	Special Jury Award	Fly with the Crane	Won
2014	5th China Film Director's Guild Awards	Best Young Director	Li Ruijun	Won
