= The Summer Solstice (film) =

- Film poster
- Directed by: Li Ruijun
- Screenplay by: Li Ruijun
- Produced by: Li Ruijun
- Starring: Hui Zheng
- Cinematography: Liu Ganjun
- Edited by: Li Ruijun
- Music by: Li Ruijun
- Release date: 2007
- Running time: 105 minutes
- Country: China
- Language: Mandarin

The Summer Solstice (Chinese: 夏至; pinyin: xià zhì) is a 2007 Chinese drama film written, produced, and directed by first-time director Li Ruijun, who creates a portrait of a 21st-century Chinese family who pursue their dreams in a changing world.

== Synopsis ==
Hu Yang arrives in Beijing during a hot summer to make his fortune, but his company goes broke, and he becomes a monk, begging for alms.

== Cast ==
- Hui Zheng as Hu Yang
- Rina Duo as Hu Xiao
- Liangliang Pan as San'er
- Jinyang Song as Yang Hua
- Min Zhang as Zhang Aihua

== Awards and nominations ==
Year	Award	Category	Recipient	Result
2007	9th International Panorama of Independent Film and Video Makers	Special Feature Film Award	The Summer Solstice	Won
