= Eat Your Catfish =

2021 documentary film

- Directed by: Adam Isenberg; Noah Amir Arjomand; Senem Tüzen
- Written by: Adam Isenberg; Senem Tüzen
- Produced by: Adam Isenberg; Noah Amir Arjomand; Senem Tüzen
- Cinematography: Noah Amir Arjomand
- Edited by: Adam Isenberg; Senem Tüzen
- Music by: Daniel Whitworth
- Production company: Zela Film
- Distributed by: RAI Film (institutional, all territories); Grasshopper Film (North America)
- Release date: 2021
- Running time: 74 minutes
- Countries: United States; Turkey; Spain
- Language: English

Eat Your Catfish is a 2021 documentary film directed and produced by Adam Isenberg, Noah Amir Arjomand and Senem Tüzen. A co-production between the United States, Turkey and Spain, the film is constructed entirely from a fixed camera placed in the New York City apartment of Kathryn Arjomand, a woman in the late stages of amyotrophic lateral sclerosis (ALS). It follows Kathryn, her husband Saïd and their adult son Noah as they manage 24-hour care, financial strain and unresolved tensions around illness, disability and caregiving, while Kathryn focuses on living long enough to see her daughter's wedding.

Eat Your Catfish premiered in the Envision Competition at the 2021 International Documentary Film Festival Amsterdam (IDFA), where it was nominated for the festival's best documentary award. In 2022 it won Best Documentary at the Istanbul International Film Festival and Best International Documentary at the Antenna Documentary Film Festival in Sydney, and received further nominations at the Santa Barbara International Film Festival, Full Frame Documentary Film Festival, the Turkish Film Critics Association (SIYAD) Awards and Sheffield DocFest. The film had its U.S. television premiere on 24 July 2023 on the PBS documentary strand POV. In 2024, the POV broadcast of Eat Your Catfish received an Emmy for Outstanding Social Issue Documentary at the 45th News and Documentary Emmy Awards.

== Synopsis ==
The film is shot from a single, fixed camera positioned at the foot of Kathryn Arjomand’s bed, showing the confined space where she spends most of her time. Years of ALS have left her paralyzed and reliant on mechanical ventilation, with round-the-clock assistance from family members and paid caregivers.

Within this restricted frame, the film observes the daily rhythms and frictions of the household: nurses starting and quitting, arguments over money and care, and moments of gallows humour between Kathryn, her husband Saïd, and their son Noah. Kathryn, who communicates via an eye-tracking keyboard, offers a running, sardonic commentary on her situation, her marriage and the healthcare system.

The narrative gradually orients around Kathryn’s stated wish to stay alive long enough to attend the wedding of her daughter Minou. The approaching date of the ceremony becomes a loose temporal spine for the film, as caregiving crises, emotional confrontations and small moments of solidarity accumulate in the lead-up to the event. The camera never leaves Kathryn’s vantage point; glimpses of the outside world arrive only through visitors, phone calls and the offscreen sounds of New York City.

== Production ==
The project consists of filming by Noah Amir Arjomand, Kathryn’s son, who documented life in the family apartment as she entered late-stage ALS. Over several months the filmmakers accumulated around 930 hours of material, all shot without a crew present from a fixed camera locked to Kathryn’s point of view.

The film was produced by Zela Film, a company co-founded by Tüzen and Isenberg, with all three directors also serving as producers. Arjomand is credited as cinematographer, while Isenberg and Tüzen edited the film. The score was composed by Daniel Whitworth.

In interviews the directors have described the formal constraint of the fixed camera as both a practical solution to working in a small, medically intensive space and an ethical choice intended to foreground Kathryn’s subjective perspective rather than an external observational gaze.

== Release ==
=== Festival run ===
Eat Your Catfish had its world premiere in November 2021 in the Envision Competition at the International Documentary Film Festival Amsterdam (IDFA), where it was nominated for the festival’s best documentary award. The film subsequently screened at festivals including Full Frame, the Istanbul International Film Festival, Sheffield DocFest, the Santa Barbara International Film Festival and the Antenna Documentary Film Festival.

At the 41st Istanbul International Film Festival in 2022, Eat Your Catfish won the National Documentary Competition’s Best Documentary award. The same year it received the Grand Prize for Best International Feature Documentary at Antenna in Sydney.

=== Television and streaming ===
In the United States, Eat Your Catfish was broadcast on 24 July 2023 as part of season 36 of PBS’s POV series.

== Reception ==
=== Critical response ===
Critics praised Eat Your Catfish for its formal rigor and emotional intensity. In a review for Variety, Guy Lodge described the film as "an unusually unsentimental, everyday document of ALS, tender in the expressly painful manner of a fresh bruise." Writing for Screen International, Nikki Baughan called it "intimate, brutally honest" and emphasised how the single-point-of-view structure gives Kathryn control over the telling of her own story and highlights the contradictions of her anger, humour and desire to live.

Writing for Business Doc Europe, Mark Adams called it "an astonishingly open, moving, funny and challenging insight into the world of a woman paralysed but with her mind intact…an intimate and powerful portrait of a family stretched to its very breaking point.”

On review aggregator Rotten Tomatoes all reviews are positive, with critics highlighting both its ethical approach to disability representation and its formally constrained but inventive design.

== Accolades ==
Year	Award / Festival	Category	Result	Ref
2021	International Documentary Film Festival Amsterdam (IDFA)	Envision Competition – Best Documentary	Nominated	
2022	Istanbul International Film Festival	Best Documentary (National Documentary Competition)	Won	
2022	Antenna Documentary Film Festival (Sydney)	Best International / Best Feature Documentary (Grand Prize)	Won	
2022	Santa Barbara International Film Festival	Best Feature Documentary	Nominated	
2022	Full Frame Documentary Film Festival	Feature Competition	Nominated	
2022	SIYAD (Turkish Film Critics Association) Awards	Best Documentary	Nominated	
2022	Sheffield DocFest	Youth Jury Award	Nominated	
2024	News & Documentary Emmy Awards (via POV broadcast)	Outstanding Social Issue Documentary	Won	

== See also ==
- POV (TV series)
