= River Road (film) =

- Film poster
- Directed by: Li Ruijun
- Screenplay by: Li Ruijun
- Produced by: Yang Cheng; Geng Xiaonan; Li Ruijun
- Starring: Tang Long; Guo Songtao
- Cinematography: Liu Yonghong
- Edited by: Li Ruijun
- Music by: Peyman Yazdanian
- Release dates: 26 October 2014 (Tokyo International Film Festival); 23 October 2015
- Running time: 103 minutes
- Country: China
- Languages: Turkic; Mandarin

River Road (Chinese: 家在水草丰茂的地方; pinyin: jiā zài shuǐ cǎo fēng mào de dì fāng) is a 2014 Chinese drama film written and directed by Li Ruijun and starring Tang Long and Guo Songtao. It made its world premiere at the 27th Tokyo International Film Festival, in 2014.

== Synopsis ==
While their parents graze their sheep far from the town, Adikeer stays at a boarding school in town and his older brother, Bartel, lives with their grandfather, a sheep herder from the Buddhist Yugur ethnic minority. When their father fails to pick them up for summer break and their grandfather dies suddenly, the two brothers embark on a journey with their camels across the vast, dry expanse of western China alone, in search of their father, by following the path of a dried-up river bed.

== Cast ==
- Tang Long as Adikeer
- Guo Songtao as Bartel
- Bai Wenxin as Grandfather
- Guo Jianmin as Father
- Ma Xingchun as Monk

== Awards and nominations ==
Year	Award	Category	Recipient	Result
2014	27th Tokyo International Film Festival	Best Film	River Road	Nominated
2014	2nd International Film Festival of Colombo	Best Film (Asian Competition)	River Road	Won
2015	65th Berlin International Film Festival	Best Feature Film	River Road	Nominated
2015	39th Hong Kong International Film Festival	SIGNIS Award	River Road	Won

== Reception ==
With no big stars and a little-known director, River Road was largely overlooked at the box office, even though domestic film critics like Wei Junzi highly recommended it on Sina Weibo on the day of its premiere.
