= Eugenia Mandzhieva =

Russian model and actress

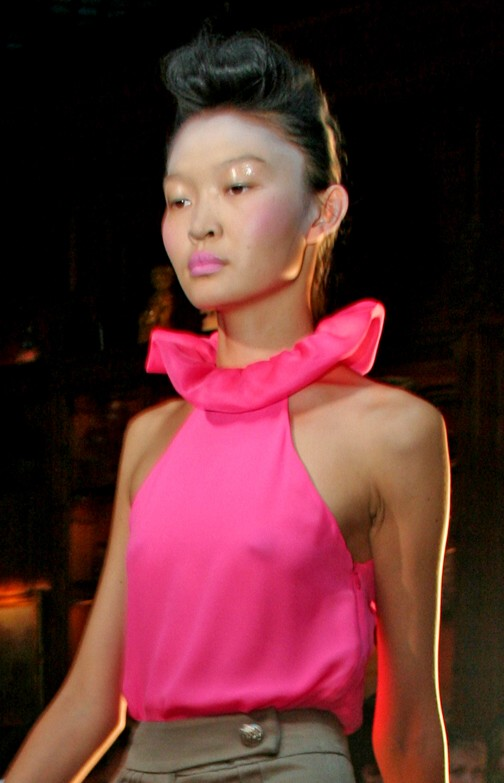
- Mandzhieva modeling in Ruffian spring 2008 show, New York Fashion Week, September 2007.
- Born: 2 September 1985 (age 39); Elista, Kalmyk ASSR, Soviet Union
- Modeling information
- Height: 5 ft 11 in (1.80 m)
- Hair color: Black
- Eye color: Brown

Eugenia Mandzhieva (Russian: Евгения Манджиева, born 2 September 1985) is a Russian fashion model and actress of Kalmyk descent. She has appeared on the cover of Russian Vogue and Vogue China and is a regular model on the runway for Jean-Paul Gaultier, Marc Jacobs, Hugo Boss, Vera Wang, Vivienne Westwood and others.

She has been featured in advertising campaigns for Costume National, MAC Cosmetics, Vera Wang, Garnier, Diesel, Moschino and Uniqlo. In 2008, Time referred to Mandzhieva as a rising star.

She made her big screen debut with the film The Gulls, a Russian drama in Kalmyk that premiered at the 2015 Berlinale.
