= Park Jung-bum =

South Korean filmmaker (born 1976)

- Born: 1976 (age 49–50); Seoul, South Korea
- Occupations: Film director; screenwriter; actor

Korean name
- Hangul: 박정범
- RR: Bak Jeongbeom
- MR: Pak Chŏngbŏm

Park Jung-bum (Korean: 박정범; born 1976) is a South Korean film director, screenwriter and actor. Park wrote, directed, and acted in his directorial debut The Journals of Musan (2011), which won the New Currents Award and FIPRESCI Award at the 15th Busan International Film Festival, Golden Star at the 10th Marrakech International Film Festival, Tiger Award at the 39th International Film Festival Rotterdam, Grand Prize and Young Critics Award at the 47th Pesaro International Film Festival, Jury Prize at the 13th Deauville Asian Film Festival, and more – a total of 17 awards were won at major film festivals around the world since it premiered at the Busan International Film Festival in 2010.

== Filmography ==
Year	Film	Credited as					Notes
Year	Film	Director	Writer	Producer	Cinematographer	Actor	Notes
2001	Templementary	Yes	Yes	Yes	No	Yes	Short film
2008	125 JEON Seung-chul	Yes	Yes	Yes	No	Yes	Short film
2010	Poetry	Assistant	No	No	No	No	
2011	The Journals of Musan	Yes	Yes	Executive	No	Yes	
2012	Jury	No	No	No	No	Yes	Short film
2013	If You; Were Me 6	Yes	Yes	No	No	No	Segment: "Dear Du-han"
2014	Alive	Yes	Yes	Yes	Yes	Yes	
2015	Now Playing	No	No	No	No	Yes	
2015	Family	No	No	No	No	Yes	
2016	A Quiet Dream	No	No	No	No	Yes	
2017	Daddy You, Daughter Me	No	No	No	No	Yes	
2019	Height of the Wave	Yes	No	No	No	Yes	
2019	Not in This World	Yes	No	No	No	Yes	
2020	All the Things We Never Said	No	No	No	No	Yes	
2021	The Asian Angel	No	No	Yes	No	No	
2022	The Policeman's Lineage	No	No	No	No	Yes	

== Awards ==
- 2008 34th Seoul Independent Film Festival: Award for Excellence (125 Jeon Seung-chul)
- 2011 10th Tribeca Film Festival: Best New Narrative Filmmaker (The Journals of Musan)
- 2011 20th Buil Film Awards: Best New Director (The Journals of Musan)
- 2011 31st Korean Association of Film Critics Awards: Best New Director (The Journals of Musan)
- 2014 29th Mar del Plata International Film Festival: Silver Astor for Best Actor (Alive)
- 2015 9th Asia Pacific Screen Awards: Jury Grand Prize (Alive)
