= Mano Khalil =

Kurdish-Swiss film director

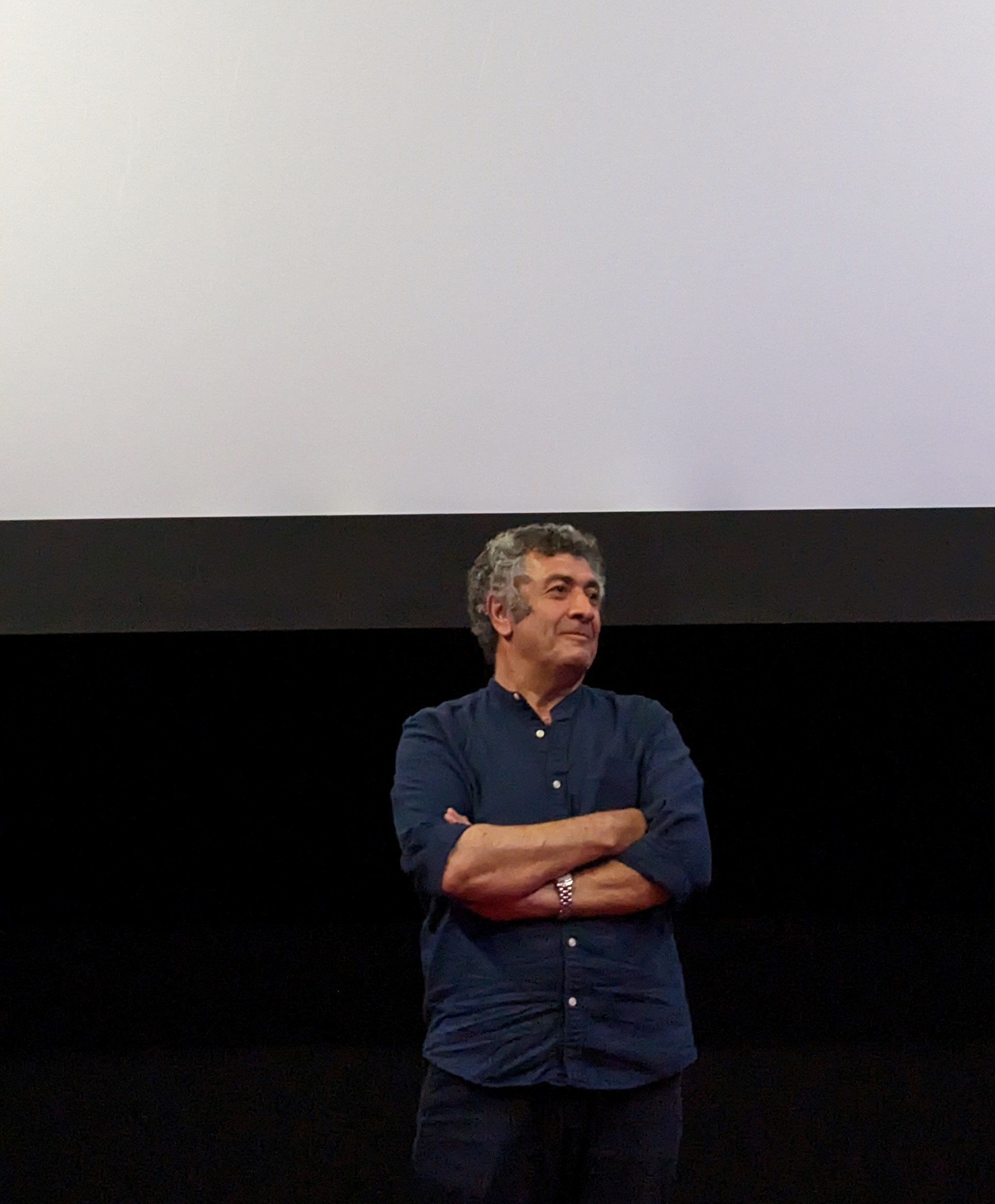

Mano Khalil is a Kurdish-Swiss film director living in Switzerland.

== Biography ==
He studied history and law at Damascus University and moved to Czechoslovakia in 1987 to study fiction and film direction. Between 1990 and 1995 he worked as an independent film director for Czechoslovak and later for Slovak Television. Since 1996, he has lived in Switzerland, working as an independent film director and producer.

== Filmography ==
- 2007 David der Tolhildan, Documentary, 54 Min. co production with Swiss TV SF, TSR, TSI.
- Neighbours, 2021 (Director)
