= Pietà (film) =

2012 film directed by Kim Ki-duk

- Theatrical release poster
- Hangul: 피에타
- RR: Pieta
- MR: P'iet'a
- Directed by: Kim Ki-duk
- Written by: Kim Ki-duk
- Produced by: Kim Soon-mo; Kim Ki-duk
- Starring: Lee Jung-jin; Jo Min-su
- Cinematography: Cho Young-jik
- Edited by: Kim Ki-duk
- Music by: Park In-young
- Distributed by: Next Entertainment World
- Release dates: September 3, 2012 (Venice); September 6, 2012 (South Korea)
- Running time: 104 minutes
- Country: South Korea
- Languages: Korean; English
- Box office: US$3,601,250

Pietà (Korean: 피에타) is a 2012 South Korean crime thriller film written and directed by Kim Ki-duk. It depicts the mysterious relationship between a brutal man who works for loan sharks and a middle-aged woman who claims that she is his mother, mixing Christian symbolism and highly sexual content.

It made its world premiere in the competition line-up of the 69th Venice International Film Festival, where it won the Golden Lion. It is the first Korean film to win the top prize at one of the three major international film festivals—Venice, Cannes and Berlin.

The title refers to the Italian Pietà (piety/pity), signifying depictions of the Virgin Mary cradling the corpse of Jesus.

== Plot ==
Kang-do leads a solitary life as a seemingly heartless and brutal debt collector for his clients, loan sharks who demand a 10x return on a one-month loan. To recover the massive interest, the debtors sign an insurance application for handicaps, and Kang-do injures them to file the claims.

In one such instance, Kang-do visits Hun-cheol, who works in a decrepit factory with his wife Myeong-ja. The small loan he took out a month ago has snowballed into a much larger figure, and Kang-do arrives to cripple him and file the claim. In an act of desperation, Myeong-ja tries to seduce Kang-do by stripping, begging him to give them another week to get the money for the interest. Kang-do strips her to her bra, but refuses to have sex with her. He cripples Hun-cheol and files for the insurance.

Later, he notices he is being followed by a middle aged woman. She claims that she is his biological mother, who abandoned him 30 years ago, and introduces herself as Mi-sun. Despite initially pushing her away, Kang-do eventually lets her into his life and opens up to her, mellowing in the process. He is less harsh in pursuing interest, on one occasion refusing to injure a young factory worker who is about to become a father. Seemingly innocent on the surface, Kang-do's relationship with Mi-sun is disturbed by his abandonment anxiety and his life growing up without a mother figure, which manifests itself in sexual ways. Kang-do molests her, asking "I came out of here? Can I go back in?". Another time he tries to get into bed with her and put his face against her breasts. Both times he is pushed away and she is uncomfortable.

On an outing with his mother, Kang-do is childishly excited and whimsical. When insulted by a bystander, he almost gets into a physical altercation. They are followed home by one of the debtors Kang-do has crippled, who is now a beggar. The beggar holds Kang-do's mother hostage as revenge for crippling him, but is mortally wounded in the altercation. Frightened by the situation, Kang-do asks Mi-sun not to go outside without him for her safety.

As Kang-do's birthday approaches, Mi-sun fakes a kidnapping and leaves the house. It is revealed that she isn't actually Kang-do's biological mother, but the mother of a debtor Kang-do crippled in the past, who subsequently committed suicide. Not knowing this, Kang-do desperately chases every person he crippled in the past in order to find Mi-sun. He finds Myeong-ja and Hun-cheol, who now live on Myeong-ja's earnings from selling food on the side of a highway to live after Hun-cheol was left crippled and unable to work. Kang-do is forced to face the consequences of his job as a loan shark, as many of his debtors either die or live in poverty.

Mi-sun commits suicide in front of Kang-do, but expresses pity for him before doing so. After her death Kang-do realizes she isn't his mother, and buries her next to her son. Kang-do commits suicide by tying himself underneath Myeong-ja's truck, which she unknowingly drives, leaving behind a steady trail of his blood.

== Cast ==
- Lee Jung-jin as Lee Kang-do
- Jo Min-su as Jang Mi-sun
- Kang Eun-jin as Myeong-ja, Hun-cheol's wife
- Woo Gi-hong as Hun-cheol
- Cho Jae-ryong as Tae-seung
- Lee Myeong-ja as Mother of man who committed suicide using drugs
- Heo Jun-seok as Man who committed suicide
- Kwon Se-in as Man with guitar
- Song Mun-su as Man who committed suicide by falling
- Kim Beom-jun as Myeongdong man
- Son Jong-hak as Loan shark boss
- Jin Yong-ok as Wheelchair man
- Kim Seo-hyeon as Old woman
- Yu Ha-bok as Container man
- Seo Jae-gyeong as Kid
- Kim Jae-rok as Monk
- Lee Won-jang as Sang-gu, committed suicide by hanging
- Kim Sun-mo as Jong-do's neighbour
- Kang Seung-hyeon as neighbouring shop owner
- Hwang Sun-hui as old woman

== Themes ==
=== Violence and sexual content ===
The film's depiction of the violence and sexuality between Kang-do and the woman who claims to be his long-lost mother have provoked intense reactions and is debated by critics. Some of the most controversial scenes in the film includes when Kang-do feeds the woman a piece of his own flesh from his thigh, and a scene when he molests her, and asking her "I came out of here? Can I go back in?". There is another subsequent scene when she gives Kang-do a handjob.

== Release ==
Pietà premiered in competition at the Venice Film Festival on September 4, 2012. It received theatrical release in South Korea on September 6, 2012.

The film has been sold to 20 countries for international distribution, including Italy, Germany, Russia, Norway, Turkey, Hong Kong, and Greece. Independent distributor, Drafthouse Films is doing a theatrical release in North America.

It was Korea's Foreign Language Film submission to the 85th Academy Awards, but it did not make the final shortlist.

== Reception ==
The film won the Golden Lion prize at the 69th Venice International Film Festival. At its Venice press screening, it reportedly "elicited extremely mixed reactions". Hollywood director Michael Mann, who presided over the jury, said the film stood out because it "seduced you viscerally."

On the review aggregator website Rotten Tomatoes, the film holds an approval rating of 73% based on 55 reviews, with an average rating of 6.6/10. The website's critics consensus reads, "It lacks subtlety and depth of character, but Pieta gets by with committed performances and a darkly ambitious, deceptively simple message." Metacritic, which uses a weighted average, assigned the film a score of 72 out of 100, based on 17 critics, indicating "generally favorable" reviews. Deborah Young of The Hollywood Reporter described it as "an intense and, for the first hour, sickeningly violent film that unexpectedly segues into a moving psychological study." Young gave high praises to the film's acting performances, however states "it's not an exaggeration to say there's not a single pleasant moment in the film's first half" and "Viewers will keep their eyes closed" for the majority of the film. Young further praised the visual style of the film with "Kim gives scenes a dark, hand-held look in which the frame edge disappears into black shadows. It's not a particularly attractive style but does reflect the ugliness of its subject."

Leslie Felperin of Variety describes it as the director's "most commercial pic in years" though it nonetheless features the director's usual trademarks of "brutal violence, rape, animal slaughter and the ingestion of disgusting objects." Felperin further states the film is a "blend of cruelty, wit and moral complexity."

Dan Fainaru of Screen International states "Starting with a grisly suicide and ending with a burial, this isn't an easy or pleasant film to watch."

Oliver Lyttelton of IndieWire praised the two lead actor's performances and their on-screen chemistry as mother and son: "there's a real tenderness to the two performances, particularly that of Lee, who reverts from a strong-and-silent brute to easing into the childhood that he never got to live. And the disturbing, vaguely Oedipal relationship at the core is a fascinating one..." However Lyttelton gave the film a C+, and criticizes "It's a shame then, that in the second half of the film, the twisted mother-son relationship shifts gears and becomes something closer to the kind of revenge movie that Korean cinema has become known for. It's not quite a full-on genre exercise, but it's probably the closest to such a thing that Kim's ever made, and while he has his own twists to provide, it's still a disappointingly conventional turn for the film to take."

== Awards ==
Awards	Category	Recipient	Result	Ref.
69th Venice International Film Festival	Golden Lion	Kim Ki-duk	Won	
69th Venice International Film Festival	Golden Mouse	Kim Ki-duk	Won	
69th Venice International Film Festival	Little Golden Lion	Kim Ki-duk	Won	
69th Venice International Film Festival	Nazareno Taddei Award	Kim Ki-duk	Won	
Black Movie Film Festival	Critics Prize	Kim Ki-duk	Nominated	
Tokyo Filmex	Audience Award	Kim Ki-duk	Won	
32nd Korean Association of Film Critics Awards	Best Film	Pietà	Won	
32nd Korean Association of Film Critics Awards	Best Director	Kim Ki-duk	Won	
32nd Korean Association of Film Critics Awards	Best Actress	Jo Min-su	Won	
32nd Korean Association of Film Critics Awards	FIPRESCI Award	Pietà	Won	
49th Grand Bell Awards	Best Film	Pietà	Nominated	
49th Grand Bell Awards	Best Director	Kim Ki-duk	Nominated	
49th Grand Bell Awards	Best Actress	Jo Min-su	Won	
49th Grand Bell Awards	Best Supporting Actress	Kang Eun-jin	Nominated	
49th Grand Bell Awards	Best New Actress	Kang Eun-jin	Nominated	
49th Grand Bell Awards	Best New Actor	Woo Gi-hong	Nominated	
49th Grand Bell Awards	Special Jury Prize	Kim Ki-duk	Won	
Korean Popular Culture and Art Awards	Order of Cultural Merit	Kim Ki-duk	Won	
Korean Popular Culture and Art Awards	Order of Cultural Merit	Jo Min-su	Won	
Korean Popular Culture and Art Awards	Order of Cultural Merit	Lee Jung-jin	Won	
6th Asia Pacific Screen Awards	Best Actress	Jo Min-su	Nominated	
6th Asia Pacific Screen Awards	Jury Grand Prize	Jo Min-su	Won	
33rd Blue Dragon Film Awards	Best Film	Pietà	Won	
33rd Blue Dragon Film Awards	Best Director	Kim Ki-duk	Nominated	
33rd Blue Dragon Film Awards	Best Leading Actress	Jo Min-su	Nominated	
2nd Shin Young-kyun Arts and Culture Foundation's Beautiful Artist Awards	Grand Prize (Daesang)	Kim Ki-duk	Won	
Korean Art Critics' Conference	Best Artist Award	Kim Ki-duk	Won	
Women in Film Korea Awards	Best Technical Award (Music Composer)	Park In-young	Won	
17th Satellite Awards	Best Director	Kim Ki-duk	Nominated	
17th Satellite Awards	Best Original Screenplay	Pietà	Nominated	
17th Satellite Awards	Best Foreign Language Film	Pietà	Won	
9th Dubai International Film Festival	Best Director (Muhr AsiaAfrica)	Kim Ki-duk	Won	
Korea Film Actor's Association	Lifetime Achievement Award	Kim Ki-duk	Won	
Korea Film Actor's Association	Achievement Award	Jo Min-su	Won	
Korea Film Actor's Association	Achievement Award	Lee Jung-jin	Won	
4th KOFRA Film Awards	Best Film	Pietà	Won	
4th KOFRA Film Awards	Best Actress	Jo Min-su	Won	
23rd Fantasporto Director's Week	Best Film	Pietà	Won	
23rd Fantasporto Director's Week	Best Actress	Jo Min-su	Won	
7th Asian Film Awards	Best Film	Pietà	Nominated	
7th Asian Film Awards	Best Director	Kim Ki-duk	Nominated	
7th Asian Film Awards	Best Actress	Jo Min-su	Nominated	
7th Asian Film Awards	Favorite Actress	Jo Min-su	Won	
49th Baeksang Arts Awards	Best Film	Pietà	Nominated	
49th Baeksang Arts Awards	Best Director	Kim Ki-duk	Nominated	
49th Baeksang Arts Awards	Best Actress	Jo Min-su	Nominated	
22nd Buil Film Awards	Best Actress	Jo Min-su	Nominated	
22nd Buil Film Awards	Best Art Direction	Lee Hyun-joo	Nominated	

== Remake ==
Theal, a 2022 Indian action film directed by Harikumar, liberally adapts the film with the action set in India.

== See also ==
- List of submissions to the 85th Academy Awards for Best Foreign Language Film
- List of South Korean submissions for the Academy Award for Best Foreign Language Film
