= Senem Tüzen =

Turkish film director (born 1980)

- Born: 1980 (age 45–46); Ankara, Turkey
- Occupations: Film director, Scriptwriter, Film Producer, Film Editor, Cinematographer
- Years active: 2004-present

Senem Tüzen (born 1980) is a Turkish film director, screenwriter, producer, cinematographer and editor. She is best known for her 2015 film Motherland. for which she earned the Best Screenplay award at the Asia Pacific Screen Awards in 2015, the Warsaw International Film Festival's FIPRESCI award, and the Tbilisi Film Festival's Golden Prometheus Award for Best Film. She co-directed the documentary Eat Your Catfish, which premiered at the IDFA International Documentary Film Festival, Envision Competition Section, in 2021.

== Personal life ==
Tüzen is married, and has two sons.

== Education ==
Tüzen is a graduate of the Mimar Sinan Fine Arts University, holding a degree in Cinema and Television.

== Career ==
Tüzen's film career has seen her in a variety of roles. She holds credits as a director, scriptwriter, producer, cinematographer and editor. Her work frequently features themes of women's role within society and how that applies within the family. A Life Without Words (una Vida Sin Palabras) focuses on the role of three deaf siblings living in rural Nicaragua, and looks at the intersections between disability, gender, and poverty, and how these things work into the family unit. Motherland especially, focuses on the uniqueness of mother-daughter relationships in Turkish culture, and how these relationships are reflective of the political landscape of Turkey. Her recent documentary Eat Your Catfish, which she co-directed, tells the story of Kathryn, a middle aged ALS patient living in New York and her family diveded by this terminal illness.

[13]

Tüzen and her husband co-founded the production company Zela Film which produced her feature film Motherland. Zela Film also produced her 2011 documentary A Life Without Words (Una Vida Sin Palabras). Zela Film's other projects include:

== Awards and Accolades ==
Tüzen's feature film, Motherland is by far her most well awarded film, in 2015 it won the Asia Pacific Screen Awards award for Best Screenplay, as well as the FIPRESCI award at the Warsaw International Film Festival, and the Tbilisi Film Festival's Golden Prometheus Award for Best Film. Previous to Motherland, Tüzen also won two IFSAK Best Short Film Awards for Rats (2005) and Milk and Chocolate (2008). Milk and Chocolate (2008) also received a nomination for the Turkish Film Critics Association's Best Short award. The same year, her other short film, named Unus Mundus won the best short film award. Her last feature documentary Eat Your Catfish (2021), which she co-directed, won best documentary at Istanbul Film Festival and Best International documentary at Atenna Film Festival.

== Filmography ==
Tüzen's early filmography contains primarily short films, only in the later part of her career has she worked on documentaries and feature films.

Yeah	Title	Type	Role
2004	Ali's Dream	Short	Writer, director
2005	Rats	Short	Writer, director
2007	Unus Mundus	Short	Writer, director
2008	Milk and Chocolate	Short	Writer, director
2010	Arpeggio ante lucem (pera berbangê)	Short	Cinematographer, editor
2011	A Life Without Words	Documentary	Director, Editor, Producer
2015	Motherland	Feature Film	Director, editor, producer, writer
2021	Eat Your Catfish	Feature Documentary	Co-director, co-producer, editor, writer
