= The Old Donkey =

- Film poster
- Chinese: 老驢頭
- Hanyu Pinyin: lǎo lǘ tóu
- Directed by: Li Ruijun
- Written by: Li Ruijun; Peng Tao
- Produced by: Zhang Xian-min; Zeng Wenwen; Cui Zi'en
- Starring: Ma Xingchun; Zhang Min
- Cinematography: Yang Jin
- Edited by: Zhang Jun; Li Ruijun
- Music by: Li Ruijun
- Release date: 9 October 2010 (BIFF)
- Running time: 112 minutes
- Country: China
- Language: Mandarin

The Old Donkey (Chinese: 老驢頭; pinyin: lǎo lǘ tóu) is a 2010 Chinese drama film written, edited, and directed by Li Ruijun. It made its world premiere at the 15th Busan International Film Festival in 2010.

== Synopsis ==
The film tells the story of Ma, nicknamed Old Donkey, an 84-year-old man who refuses to sell his land to a rich man who is buying up land in a small village in the northern Chinese province of Gansu, in order to build a chemical factory.

== Cast ==
- Ma Xingchun as Ma
- Zhang Min as Ma Lianhua
- Sun Chunyan as Zhang Yongfu
- Wang Dazhi as Ma Dazhi

== Awards and nominations ==
Year	Award	Category	Recipient	Result
2010	7th China Independent Film Festival	Narrative Feature Film (1st Prize)	The Old Donkey	Won

== Production ==
Li started filming The Old Donkey in 2006.
