= Jo Min-su =

South Korean actress (born 1965)

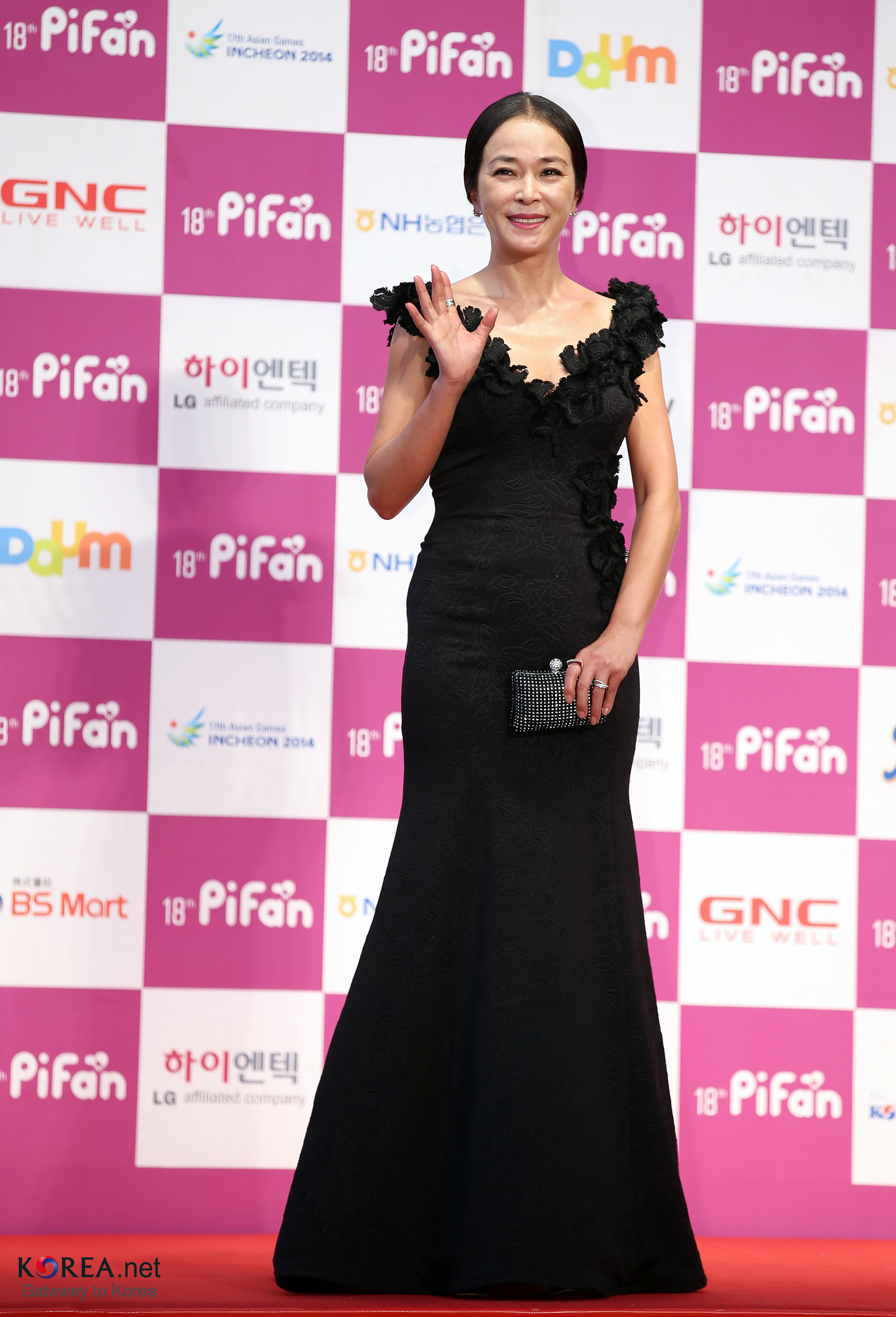
- Jo in 2014
- Born: January 29, 1965 (age 61); Seoul, South Korea
- Occupation: Actress
- Years active: 1983–present
- Agent: Management Koo
- Known for: Pietà

Korean name
- Hangul: 조민수
- Hanja: 趙敏修
- RR: Jo Minsu
- MR: Cho Minsu

Jo Min-su (Korean: 조민수; born January 29, 1965) is a South Korean actress. She is best known for her role in the Kim Ki-duk film Pietà.

== Career ==
Jo Min-su graduated from a vocational high school, Gyungbok Girls' Commercial High School, and first entered the entertainment business by doing a television commercial for ₩120 thousand (about US$100). She debuted in 1986 via the KBS TV Cultural Center, then appeared first on the big screen in Chung: Blue Sketch. But her public profile grew more through her television roles than movies, culminating in a Best Actress trophy in the 1989 KBS Drama Awards. Among her other notable TV series were Sandglass, Daemang (also known as Great Ambition), and Piano. After her marriage in 2005, she took a break from her acting career, but returned four years later with a memorable performance in Will It Snow for Christmas?.

But 2012 would prove to be the now-veteran actress's breakthrough year. Though she initially had reservations about doing a film by controversial auteur Kim Ki-duk, Jo became thankful to Kim for giving her the chance "to work with new material from what I was used to in the past. There aren't too many roles that women my age can do. They all seem the same. But this role was different." Her performance in Pietà brought her rave reviews and praise at the Venice Film Festival, as well as from domestic critics and audiences, notably a Best Actress trophy at the Grand Bell Awards. She was also awarded the prestigious Okgwan Order of Cultural Merit.

== Filmography ==
=== Film ===
| Year | Title | Role | Notes/Ref. |
|---|---|---|---|
| 1986 | Chung: Blue Sketch | Yu-mi | |
| 1986 | Son of God | Jeon Bo-bae | |
| 1990 | I'm Gonna Do Something Shocking | Jang-mi | |
| 1995 | Man? | Mi-ah | |
| 2005 | Boy Goes to Heaven | Ne-mo's mother | Cameo |
| 2012 | Pietà | Jang Mi-sun | |
| 2013 | The Stone | Lee Tae-sam | Cameo |
| 2014 | Venus Talk | Lee Hae-young | |
| 2018 | The Witch: Part 1. The Subversion | Doctor Baek | |
| 2022 | The Witch : Part 2. The Other One | General Baek | |
| 2023 | Love Reset | Bo-bae | |

=== Television series ===
| Year | Title | Role | Network |
|---|---|---|---|
| 1986 | TV Literature: "Fire" | | KBS1 |
| 1986 | TV Literature: "Tale of a Mad Painter" | Blind girl | KBS1 |
| 1986 | I'm Leaving for Ewha | | KBS2 |
| 1986 | Rich Artifacts | | KBS1 |
| 1987 | TV Literature: "Stairway of Green" | | KBS1 |
| 1987 | Door of Desire | Tan-sil, Chung Ju-yung's wife | KBS2 |
| 1987 | Where Does the Stream Go Flowing? | | KBS |
| 1988 | Sun Rising Over the Hill | | KBS2 |
| 1988 | Punggaek | Park Da-som | KBS2 |
| 1989 | Wang Rung's Family | Woman from Seoul | KBS2 |
| 1989 | Mount Jiri | Partisan Soon-yi | KBS1 |
| 1989 | Merry Go Round | | KBS1 |
| 1989 | Moonlight Family | Young-sook | KBS2 |
| 1990 | Pacheonmu | Yeon-shil | KBS2 |
| 1990–1998 | Love on a Jujube Tree | Myo-soon | KBS1 |
| 1991 | MBC Best Theater: "A Midsummer Night's; Dream - Desert Island Blues" | Baek Hye-young | MBC |
| 1992 | TV Literary Theater: "Doll Making" | Min Young-joo | KBS1 |
| 1992 | The Woman Who Won 100 Times | Jae-hee | KBS2 |
| 1992 | Wind Blowing in the Woods | Yoo Mi-sun | KBS2 |
| 1993 | Mountain Wind | Choi Yoon-hwa | MBC |
| 1993 | Lovers | Hye-in | KBS2 |
| 1993 | Marriage | Na Seo-young | SBS |
| 1995 | Sandglass | Sun-young | SBS |
| 1995 | Asphalt Man | Bae Jong-ok | SBS |
| 1996 | Until We Can Love | | KBS2 |
| 1996 | MBC Best Theater: "Seranade for Yeo-woon" | Jung-hoo | MBC |
| 1997 | MBC Best Theater: "Changing Partners" | Ae-ri | MBC |
| 1997 | Love and Farewell | Kang Min-joo | MBC |
| 1999 | House Above the Waves | So-ran | SBS |
| 1999 | Happy Together | Seo Chan-joo | SBS |
| 2000 | The Aspen Tree | | SBS |
| 2000 | Fireworks | Heo Min-kyung | SBS |
| 2001 | Piano | Shin Hye-rim | SBS |
| 2002 | My Name is Princess | Choi Hwa-young | MBC |
| 2002 | Great Ambition | Dan-ae | SBS |
| 2002 | Ice Flower | Shin Young-joo | SBS |
| 2004 | Proposal | Han Kyung-hee | SBS |
| 2009 | Will It Snow for Christmas? | Cha Chun-hee | MBC |
| 2011 | My Daughter the Flower | Jang Soon-ae | SBS |
| 2013 | Goddess of Marriage | Song Ji-sun | SBS |
| 2020 | The Cursed | Jin Kyung | OCN |

=== Hosting ===
| Year | Title | Role | Notes | Ref. |
|---|---|---|---|---|
| 2019–present | Diaspora Film Festival | Host | with Kim Hwan (2019–present) and Seon Jung-ah (2022) | |

=== Music video appearances ===
| Year | Song title | Artist |
|---|---|---|
| 1998 | "To Heaven" | Jo Sung-mo |
| 2000 | "Y" | Koyote |
| 2015 | "The Light" | The Ark |

== Awards and nominations ==
| Year | Award | Category | Nominated work | Result |
|---|---|---|---|---|
| 1987 | KBS Drama Awards | Excellence Award, Actress | | Won |
| 1989 | KBS Drama Awards | Top Excellence Award, Actress | Mount Jiri | Won |
| 1990 | 26th Baeksang Arts Awards | Most Popular Actress (TV) | | Won |
| 2012 | Korea Film Actor's Association | Achievement Award | Pietà | Won |
| 2012 | Ministry of Culture, Sports and Tourism | Okgwan Order of Cultural Merit | Pietà | Won |
| 2012 | 6th Asia Pacific Screen Awards | Best Actress | Pietà | Nominated |
| 2012 | 6th Asia Pacific Screen Awards | Jury Grand Prize | Pietà | Won |
| 2012 | 33rd Blue Dragon Film Awards | Best Leading Actress | Pietà | Nominated |
| 2012 | 32nd Korean Association of Film Critics Awards | Best Actress | Pietà | Won |
| 2012 | 49th Grand Bell Awards | Best Actress | Pietà | Won |
| 2012 | Cine 21 Awards | Best Actress | Pietà | Won |
| 2013 | 4th KOFRA Film Awards | Best Actress | Pietà | Won |
| 2013 | 23rd Fantasporto Director's Week | Best Actress | Pietà | Won |
| 2013 | 22nd Buil Film Awards | Best Actress | Pietà | Nominated |
| 2013 | 7th Asian Film Awards | Best Actress | Pietà | Nominated |
| 2013 | 7th Asian Film Awards | People's Choice Awards | Pietà | Won |
| 2013 | 49th Baeksang Arts Awards | Best Actress (Film) | Pietà | Nominated |
| 2018 | 27th Buil Film Awards | Best Supporting Actress | The Witch: Part 1. The Subversion | Nominated |
| 2018 | 2nd China Korea International Film Festival | Best Supporting Actress | The Witch: Part 1. The Subversion | Won |
| 2019 | 24th Chunsa Film Art Awards | Best Supporting Actress | The Witch: Part 1. The Subversion | Nominated |
| 2019 | 55th Baeksang Arts Awards | Best Supporting Actress (Film) | The Witch: Part 1. The Subversion | Nominated |
| 2021 | 8th Wildflower Film Awards | Best Actress | Jazzy Misfits | Nominated |
