= My Perestroika =

- Film poster
- Directed by: Robin Hessman
- Release dates: January 24, 2010 (Sundance); March 23, 2011
- Running time: 90 minutes
- Country: United States
- Language: Russian with English subtitles

My Perestroika is a 2010 American documentary film directed by Robin Hessman. It examines life during and after the USSR through the personal stories of five ordinary Russians, who speak about their Soviet childhood, the collapse of the USSR, and contemporary Russia.

The film premiered at the 2010 Sundance Film Festival. In 2011, the documentary was awarded a Peabody Award.

== Synopsis ==
There is no single narrator in the film. Instead, the stories are told by five inhabitants of Moscow, four of whom grew up together and were classmates from primary school through high school.

Borya and Lyuba are a married couple and history teachers at the Moscow school 57. Andrei has thrived in the new Russian capitalism and has just opened a new store of French men's shirts. Olga, the prettiest girl in the class, is a single mother and works for a company that rents out billiard tables to bars and clubs all over Moscow. Ruslan was a famous Russian punk rock musician who rejects society's structures.

Some of the topics that come up are conformity and rebellion, the attitudes towards the USSR and its collapse, the benefits and challenges of the transition to contemporary Russia, and the difference between the older and the younger generations.

To tell these stories, Hessman combines first-person recollections, often filmed at the homes of the five protagonists, with home movies from the 1970s and 1980s, canonical Soviet and Russian music, and Soviet archival footage.

== Production ==
Hessman spent about a decade living in Russia. She had lived in Russia in the 1990s, completing an MFA degree in Film Directing at the All-Russian State Institute of Cinematography (Russian: Всероссийский государственный университет кинематографии) and working as the producer of the Russian version of Sesame Street (Russian: Улица Сезам). She returned to Russia in 2005 to make a film that would convey the human aspect of Russian history and the impact of significant societal and political changes on "ordinary" Russians. It was pitched to the 2007 Sheffield Doc/Fest MeetMarket prior to completion.

== Release ==
The film premiered at the Sundance Film Festival in 2010, where it was nominated for the Grand Jury Prize. It has since been screened at a number of domestic and international film festivals, including the Rotterdam Film Festival, New Directors/New Films at MoMA and Lincoln Center in NYC, Hot Docs, Full Frame Documentary Film Festival, AFI Docs, Sheffield Doc/Fest, the Pusan International Film Festival, London International Documentary Festival, and Human Rights Film Festival in Sarajevo. It has been nominated for and won several awards. My Perestroika was released in cinemas in the US and Canada in 2011 in over 70 cities. It was nationally broadcast in the US on PBS on the series POV, and it was released on home DVD in 2012.

== Reception ==
The film has met with positive reception from critics and viewers. It has a 92% rating on Rotten Tomatoes and 90% on Metacritic. It became the #3 Best Critic Reviewed Movie of 2011 on Metacritic.

== See also ==
- Perestroika
