= Li Ruijun =

Chinese film director and screenwriter (born 1983)

- Born: 1983 (age 41–42); Gaotai, Gansu, China
- Occupation(s): Film director, screenwriter
- Spouse: Zhang Min

Chinese name
- Traditional Chinese: 李 叡 珺
- Simplified Chinese: 李 睿 珺
Transcriptions
Standard Mandarin
- Hanyu Pinyin: Lǐ Ruìjùn

Li Ruijun (Chinese: 李睿珺; pinyin: Lǐ Ruìjùn, born 1983) is a Chinese film director and screenwriter.

== Life and career ==
Born in Gansu province in 1983, Li Ruijun studied music and painting at the age of fourteen. In 2003, he graduated from the China National Ministry of Radio, Film, and Television. From 2003 to 2006, he worked as director for television stations and television program providers.

He started work on his debut feature film, The Summer Solstice, in 2006, writing the script as well as directing it, and finished the post-production in 2007. He has since made five more feature films as well as one short.

== Filmography ==
- The Summer Solstice 夏至 (2007) – director, screenwriter, actor, editor, production manager
- The Old Donkey 老驢頭 (2010) – director, screenwriter, composer, editor
- Fly with the Crane 告訴他們,我乘白鶴去了 (2012) – director, screenwriter
- Present 禮物 (short film, 2014) – director, screenwriter
- One Day (segment: "Present") 有一天 (segment: "禮物") (2014) – director, screenwriter
- River Road (家在水草豐茂的地方) (2015) – director, screenwriter, editor
- Walking Past the Future (2017) – director, screenwriter
- Return to Dust (2022) – director, screenwriter, editor.

== Awards ==
- 46th Brasilia Film Festival: Best Director – Fly with the Crane (2013)
- 5th China Film Director's Guild Awards: Best Young Director – Fly with the Crane (2014)
- 67th Valladolid International Film Festival: Golden Spike – Return to Dust (2022)
