= David der Tolhildan =

David the Tolhildan
- David the Tolhildan film poster
- Directed by: Mano Khalil
- Written by: Mano Khalil
- Produced by: Mano Khalil
- Starring: David Rouiller
- Cinematography: Mano Khalil
- Music by: Peter Scherer
- Release date: 2007
- Running time: 54 minutes
- Country: Switzerland
- Languages: French; German; Kurdish

David der Tolhildan is a 2007 documentary film directed by Mano Khalil and produced in Switzerland.

== Synopsis ==
David Rouiller, the son of Claude Rouiller a university Professor and a former President of the Swiss Federal Supreme Court, gives up a comfortable lifestyle in Switzerland and commits his life to the ideals of the Kurdish movement. The film, "David the Tolhildan" encourages viewers to confront their own outlook on oppression, respect, human dignity, freedom, and violence. It also provides a view of the situation of the Kurdish freedom movement at the time of its release.
