= Yoon Sung-hyun =

South Korean filmmaker (born 1982)

- Born: August 3, 1982 (age 42); Oakland, California
- Occupation(s): Film director, screenwriter

Korean name
- Hangul: 윤성현
- RR: Yun Seonghyeon
- MR: Yun Sŏnghyŏn

Yoon Sung-hyun (Korean: 윤성현; born August 3, 1982) is a South Korean film director and screenwriter. Yoon's directorial debut, a graduation project, Bleak Night received rave reviews and won several Best New Director awards at the 48th Grand Bell Awards, 32nd Blue Dragon Film Awards and 12th Busan Film Critics Awards.

== Filmography ==
- Boys (short film) (2008) - director, screenwriter, cinematographer, editor
- Daytrip (short film) (2008) - director
- Drink and Confess (short film) (2009) - director
- Bleak Night (2011) - director, screenwriter, costume designer, editor
- If You Were Me 5 (segment: "Banana Shake") (2011) - director, screenwriter
- Jury (short film) (2013) - actor
- Time to Hunt (2020) - director, screenwriter
- Newtopia (2025) - director

== Awards ==
- 2008 9th Jeonju International Film Festival: KT&G Sangsangmadang Award - Special Jury Award (Korean Short: Critics' Week) (Boys)
- 2010 15th Busan International Film Festival: Best New Director (Bleak Night)
- 2011 48th Grand Bell Awards: Best New Director (Bleak Night)
- 2011 32nd Blue Dragon Film Awards: Best New Director (Bleak Night)
- 2011 12th Busan Film Critics Awards: Best New Director (Bleak Night)
