= Passion Portrait =

- Theatrical poster for Passion Portrait (1991)
- Hangul: 젊은날의 초상
- Hanja: 젊은날의 肖像
- RR: Jeolmeunnarui chosang
- MR: Chŏlmŭnnarŭi ch'osang
- Directed by: Kwak Ji-kyoon
- Written by: Lee Mun-yeol
- Produced by: Lee Tae-won
- Starring: Jung Bo-seok
- Cinematography: Jung Il-sung
- Edited by: Kim Hyeon
- Music by: Kim Young-dong
- Distributed by: Tae Heung Films Co., Ltd.
- Release date: March 16, 1991
- Running time: 134 minutes
- Country: South Korea
- Language: Korean

Passion Portrait (Korean: 젊은날의 초상; RR: Jeolmeunnarui chosang; lit. 'Portrait of the Days of Youth') is a 1991 South Korean film directed by Kwak Ji-kyoon. It was chosen as Best Film at the Grand Bell Awards.

== Plot ==
Melodrama about a university student's experiences with love and political ideologies.

== Cast ==
- Jung Bo-seok
- Lee Hye-sook
- Bae Jong-ok
- Ok So-ri
- Jeon In-taek
- Lee Hee-do
- Cho Jae-hyun
- Yu Yeong
- O Seung-myeong
- Kook Jong-hwan

== Bibliography ==
- "JEOLMEUN NALUI CHOSANG". The Complete Index to World Film. Archived from the original on 2012-04-06.
- 젊은날의 초상. Cine21 (in Korean).

Preceded by All That Falls Has Wings	Grand Bell Awards for Best Film; 1991	Succeeded by Fly High Run Far
