= The Gulls =

- Russian: Чайки
- Directed by: Ella Manzheeva
- Produced by: Telesto Film Company
- Starring: Eugenia Mandzhieva
- Distributed by: Antipode Sales & Distribution
- Release dates: 7 February 2015 (Berlinale); 27 October 2015 (Russia)
- Running time: 87 minutes
- Country: Russia
- Languages: Kalmyk, Russian
- Budget: $1,200,000

The Gulls (Russian: Чайки, Chaiki) is a 2015 Russian drama directed by Ella Manzheeva and starring fashion model Eugenia Mandzhieva in her big screen debut. Set against the backdrop of modern-day Kalmykia, it has been presented in various international festivals including the Berlinale and was awarded Best Debut at Kinotavr.

== Plot ==
Unhappily married to a fisherman, Elza (Eugenia Mandzhieva) finds out she is pregnant just as her husband disappears at sea.

== Cast ==
- Eugenia Mandzhieva as Elza
- Sergey Adianov
- Evgeny Sangadzhiev
- Lyubov Ubushieva
- Dmitry Mukeyev

== Release ==
The Gulls premiered at the 2015 Berlinale and went on to be screened at various film festivals including Edinburgh, Warsaw and Karlovy Vary. It was awarded Best Debut at Kinotavr.

It was released in Russia in October/November 2015, the first film about Kalmykia in Kalmyk language to hit theaters in 30 years.

== Awards ==
- 2015 Kinotavr – winner, best debut
- 2015 Asia Pacific Screen Awards – nominee, UNESCO Award
