= Kwak Ji-kyoon =

South Korean filmmaker (1954–2010)

- Born: Kwak Jung-kyoon; November 10, 1954; Daejeon, South Korea
- Died: May 25, 2010 (aged 55); Daejeon, South Korea
- Occupations: Film director, screenwriter

Korean name
- Hangul: 곽정균
- Hanja: 郭楨均
- RR: Gwak Jeonggyun
- MR: Kwak Chŏnggyun

Pen name
- Hangul: 곽지균
- Hanja: 郭志均
- RR: Gwak Jigyun
- MR: Kwak Chigyun

Kwak Ji-kyoon (Korean: 곽지균; November 10, 1954 – May 25, 2010), birth name Kwak Jung-kyoon, was a South Korean film director and screenwriter. Kwak made his directorial debut in 1986 with the film Winter Wanderer, and later directed Portrait of the Days of Youth (1991) and Plum Blossom (2000). He committed suicide on May 25, 2010, after suffering from depression for 10 years.

== Filmography ==
- So Close Yet Far (1978) - assistant director
- When Sadness Takes Over a Wave (1978) - assistant director
- Yeosu (The Loneliness of the Journey) (1979) - assistant director
- Tomorrow After Tomorrow (1979) - assistant director
- The Divine Bow (1979) - assistant director
- Mrs. Speculator (1980) - assistant director
- The Hidden Hero (1980) - assistant director
- Mandala (1981) - assistant director
- Tears of the Idol (1982) - assistant director
- As Firm As A Stone (1983) - assistant director
- Deep Blue Night (1985) - assistant director
- Deer Hunting (1985) - screenwriter
- Winter Wanderer (1986) - director
- The Home of Two Women (1987) - director, screenwriter
- Wound (1989) - director
- Long After That (1989) - director
- Portrait of the Days of Youth (1991) - director
- The Woman Who Won't Divorce (1992) - director
- Rosy Days (1994) - director
- Deep Blue (1997) - director
- Plum Blossom (2000) - director, screenwriter
- Fly High (2006) - director, screenwriter

== Awards ==
- 1986 6th Korean Association of Film Critics Awards: Best New Director (Winter Wanderer)
- 1991 29th Grand Bell Awards: Best Director (Portrait of the Days of Youth)
