= Plum Blossom (film) =

- Theatrical release poster
- Directed by: Kwak Ji-kyoon
- Written by: Kwak Ji-kyoon
- Produced by: Lee Won-gi; Oh Eun-sil
- Starring: Kim Rae-won; Kim Jung-hyun; Jin Hee-kyung; Bae Doona
- Cinematography: Ham Sun-ho
- Edited by: Kim Hyeon
- Music by: Kim Seong-jun; Song Si-hyeon
- Production companies: Eye Pictures; Won Film
- Distributed by: Cinema Service
- Release date: October 14, 2000
- Running time: 113 minutes
- Country: South Korea
- Language: Korean

Plum Blossom (Korean: 청춘; RR: Cheongchun; lit. 'Youth') is a 2000 South Korean coming-of-age film written and directed by Kwak Ji-kyoon.

== Plot ==
Kim Ja-hyo, a teenage boy, moves to a new high school in his senior year. His classmate Jeong Ha-ra seduces him, and he loses his virginity with her. Afterwards, he becomes frightened when Ha-ra obsessively declares her love for him, so he begins to avoid her. Devastated by his indifference, Ha-ra commits suicide in front of the whole school. Since then, though Ja-hyo sleeps around in college, he is unable to form lasting attachments with women. Until he meets perky nurse Seo Nam-ok.

Meanwhile, Ja-hyo's best friend Lee Su-in develops a crush on the new teacher, Yun Jeong-hye. She unwillingly rejects him because a student-teacher relationship is socially taboo. Heartbroken, Su-in gets involved with an older woman in college, but continues to pine after Jeong-hye, sending her countless letters. To get closure, he hopes to see her face-to-face one last time.

== Cast ==
- Kim Rae-won as Kim Ja-hyo
- Kim Jung-hyun as Lee Su-in
- Jin Hee-kyung as Yun Jeong-hye
- Bae Doona as Seo Nam-ok
- Yoon Ji-hye as Jeong Ha-ra
- Kim Jae-young as Seo Wan-jae
- Ham Shin-young as Ha Jeong-tae
- Park Chan-im as Oh Dal-sun
- Lee Yong-nyeo as Ha-ra's mother
- Jo Han-hee as Su-in's mother
- Go Doo-shim as Nam-ok's mother
- Lee Yoon-geon as Homeroom teacher
- Lee Chun-woo as Drunk
- Ham Sun-ho as Professor
