= The Bear (2012 film) =

- Directed by: Khosro Masumi
- Written by: Khosro Masumi
- Starring: Parviz Parastui Merila Zarei Farhad Aslani
- Release date: 2012 (Iran)
- Running time: 105 minutes
- Country: Iran
- Language: Persian

The Bear (Persian: خرس, romanized: Khers) is a 2012 Iranian film directed and written by Khosro Masumi. It is about a carpenter who is abducted by the Iraqis during the Iran–Iraq War. When he is released, he discovers his wife has remarried. The Bear was nominated for the Asia Pacific Screen Award for Best Feature Film at the 2012 Asia Pacific Screen Awards, losing to Beyond the Hill.

== Plot ==
During Iran-Iraq war Noor Aldin who is a carpenter is missing. He is captured by Iraqi army. After 8 years he returns home, but finds out that in his absence his wife is married to another man...

== Cast ==
- Parviz Parastui
- Merila Zarei
- Farhad Aslani
- Maedeh Tahmasebi
- Alireza Osivand
- Naser Aghayi
