= Motherland (2015 film) =

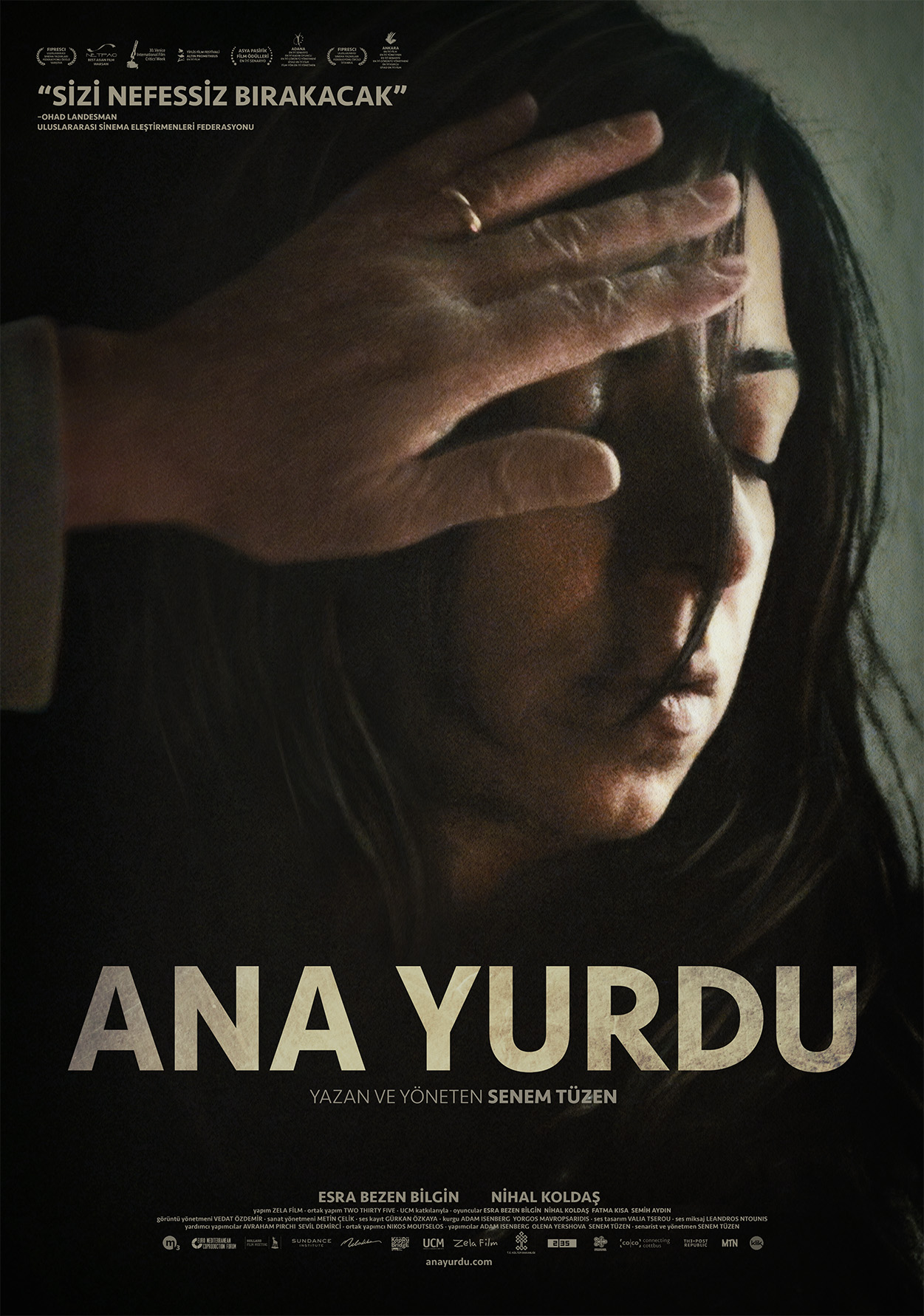
- poster
- Directed by: Senem Tüzen
- Written by: Senem Tüzen
- Produced by: Adam Isenberg; Olena Yershova; Senem Tüzen
- Starring: Esra Bezen Bilgin; Nihal Koldaş; Fatma Kısa; Semih Aydın
- Cinematography: Vedat Özdemir
- Edited by: Adam Isenberg; Yorgos Mavropsaridis
- Production company: Zela Film
- Release date: 6 September 2015 (30th Venice International Film Critics' Week)
- Running time: 98 minutes
- Countries: Turkey, Greece
- Language: Turkish

Motherland (Turkish: Ana Yurdu) is a 2015 Turkish drama film by director Senem Tüzen about a divorced, urban woman who goes to her ancestral village in Anatolia to write a book and is confronted by the unwelcomed arrival of her mother. The drama stars Esra Bezen Bilgin, Nihal Koldaş, Fatma Kısa and Semih Aydın.

Tüzen's debut feature premiered at the 72nd Venice International Film Festival in the International Film Critics' Week section in September, 2015.

== Plot ==
Nesrin is an urban, upper–middle-class woman recovering from a divorce. She's quit her office job, abandoned her house in Istanbul, and come to the village house of her deceased grandmother to finish a novel and live out her childhood dream of being a writer. When her conservative and increasingly unhinged mother turns up uninvited and refuses to leave, Nesrin's writing stalls and her fantasies of village life turn bitter as the two are forced to confront the darker corners of each other's inner worlds.

== Accolades ==
Awards				
Award	Date of ceremony	Category	Recipients and nominees	Result
Venice Film Festival	23 July 2015	Lion of the Future	Senem Tüzen	Nominated
Warsaw International Film Festival	19 October 2015	FIPRESCI Award	Senem Tüzen	Won
Warsaw International Film Festival	19 October 2015	NETPAC Award (Best Asian Film)	Senem Tüzen	Won
Tbilisi Film Festival	10 December 2015	Golden Prometheus (Best Film)	Senem Tüzen	Won
Asia Pacific Screen Awards	26 November 2015	Best Screenplay	Senem Tüzen	Won
Asia Pacific Screen Awards	5 October 2015	UNESCO Award	Senem Tüzen	Nominated
International Adana Film Festival	20 September 2015	SIYAD Best Film (Turkish Film Critics)	Senem Tüzen	Won
International Adana Film Festival	20 September 2015	Best Screenplay	Senem Tüzen	Won
International Adana Film Festival	20 September 2015	Best Lead Actress	Nihal Koldaş	Won
International Adana Film Festival	20 September 2015	Best Cinematography	Vedat Özdemir	Won
International Adana Film Festival	20 September 2015	FİLM-YÖN Best Director	Senem Tüzen	Won
Reykjavik International Film Festival	12 September 2015	Golden Puffin Award	Senem Tüzen	Nominated
Gothenburg Film Festival	12 January 2016	The Ingmar Bergman International Debut Award	Senem Tüzen	Nominated
