= Korean Association of Film Critics Awards =

South Korean Critics Choice Awards

- Hangul: 한국영화평론가협회상
- Hanja: 韓國映畫評論家協會賞
- RR: Hanguk yeonghwa pyeongnonga hyeophoesang
- MR: Han'guk yŏnghwa p'yŏngnon'ga hyŏphoesang
- Awarded for: Excellence in cinematic achievements
- Country: South Korea
- Presented by: Korean Association of Film Critics
- First award: 1980
- Final award: 2026

Highlights
- Best Film: Possible Love
- Best Director: Na Hong-jin
- Best Actor: Zo In-sung
- Best Actress: Jeon Do-yeon
- Website: http://fca.kr/

The Korean Association of Film Critics Awards (Korean: 한국영화평론가협회상), also known as the Critics Choice Awards (영평상), is an annual awards ceremony for excellence in film in South Korea. It was established in 1980 by the Korean Association of Film Critics (KAFC). The ceremony is usually held in November.

== Categories ==
- Best Film
- Best Director
- Best Actor
- Best Actress
- Best Supporting Actor
- Best Supporting Actress
- Best New Director
- Best New Actor
- Best New Actress
- Best Screenplay
- Best Cinematography
- Best Music
- Technical Award is given to achievement in visual effects, editing, art direction, lighting, or costume design
- CJ CGV Star Award
- Special Mention
- Special Achievement Award
- FIPRESCI Award (International Federation of Film Critics, Korean branch)
- Best New Critic
- Best Foreign Film
- Award for Contribution to Cinema

== Best Film ==
#	Year	Film	Director	Ref.
1	1980	Son of Man	Yu Hyun-mok	
2	1981	Three Times Each for Short and Long Ways	Kim Ho-sun	
3	1983	People of Kkobang Neighborhood	Bae Chang-ho	
4	1984	Whale Hunting	Bae Chang-ho	
5	1985	Deep Blue Night	Bae Chang-ho	
6	1986	Mulberry	Lee Doo-yong	
7	1987	Ticket	Im Kwon-taek	
8	1988	Now, We're Going to Geneva	Song Yeong-su	
9	1989	Rainbow Over Seoul	Kim Ho-sun	
10	1990	Road to Cheongsong Prison	Lee Doo-yong	
11	1991	Black Republic	Park Kwang-su	
12	1992	The Road to Racetrack	Jang Sun-woo	
13	1993	Sopyonje	Im Kwon-taek	
14	1994	Hwa-Om-Kyung	Jang Sun-woo	
15	1995	The Eternal Empire	Park Jong-won	
16	1996	Festival	Im Kwon-taek	
17	1997	Green Fish	Lee Chang-dong	
18	1998	Christmas in August	Hur Jin-ho	
19	1999	Spring in My Hometown	Lee Kwang-mo	
20	2000	Peppermint Candy	Lee Chang-dong	
21	2001	One Fine Spring Day	Hur Jin-ho	
22	2002	Oasis	Lee Chang-dong	
23	2003	Memories of Murder	Bong Joon-ho	
24	2004	Oldboy	Park Chan-wook	
25	2005	Duelist	Lee Myung-se	
26	2006	Family Ties	Kim Tae-yong	
27	2007	The Show Must Go On	Han Jae-rim	
28	2008	Night and Day	Hong Sang-soo	
29	2009	Mother	Bong Joon-ho	
30	2010	Poetry	Lee Chang-dong	
31	2011	The Front Line	Jang Hoon	
32	2012	Pietà	Kim Ki-duk	
33	2013	Snowpiercer	Bong Joon-ho	
34	2014	Hill of Freedom	Hong Sang-soo	
35	2015	The Throne	Lee Joon-ik	
36	2016	The Age of Shadows	Kim Jee-woon	
37	2017	The Fortress	Hwang Dong-hyuk	
38	2018	1987: When the Day Comes	Jang Joon-hwan	
39	2019	Parasite	Bong Joon-ho	
40	2020	The Man Standing Next	Woo Min-ho	
41	2021	The Book of Fish	Lee Jun-ik	
42	2022	Decision to Leave	Park Chan-wook	
43	2023	Next Sohee	Jung Ju-ri	
44	2024	A Wild Roomer	Lee Jeong-hong	
45	2025	The Final Semester	Lee Ran-hee	
46	2026	Possible Love	Lee Chang-dong	

== Best Director ==
#	Year	Director	Film	Ref.
1	1980	Yu Hyun-mok	Son of Man	
2	1981	Kim Ho-sun	Three Times Each for Short and Long Ways	
3	1983	Bae Chang-ho	People of Kkobang Neighborhood	
4	1984	Bae Chang-ho	Whale Hunting	
5	1985	Jung Jin-woo	Adultery Tree	
6	1986	Im Kwon-taek	Gilsoddeum	
7	1987	Im Kwon-taek	Ticket	
8	1988	Song Yeong-su	Now, We're Going to Geneva	
9	1989	Kim Ho-sun	Rainbow Over Seoul	
10	1990	Lee Doo-yong	Road to Cheongsong Prison	
11	1991	Park Kwang-su	Black Republic	
12	1992	Jang Sun-woo	Road to the Racetrack	
13	1993	Im Kwon-taek	Sopyonje	
14	1994	Jang Sun-woo	Hwa-Om-Kyung	
15	1995	Yu Hyun-mok	Mommy, Star, and Sea Anemone	
16	1996	Park Chul-soo	Farewell My Darling	
17	1997	—N/a		
18	1998	Hur Jin-ho	Christmas in August	
19	1999	Lee Kwang-mo	Spring in My Hometown	
20	2000	Lee Chang-dong	Peppermint Candy	
21	2001	Yim Soon-rye	Waikiki Brothers	
22	2002	Park Chan-wook	Sympathy for Mr. Vengeance	
23	2003	Bong Joon-ho	Memories of Murder	
24	2004	Park Chan-wook	Oldboy	
25	2005	Lee Myung-se	Duelist	
26	2006	Yoo Ha	A Dirty Carnival	
27	2007	Lee Myung-se	M	
28	2008	Kim Ki-duk	Dream	
29	2009	Kim Yong-hwa	Take Off	
30	2010	Jang Hoon	Secret Reunion	
31	2011	Jang Hoon	The Front Line	
32	2012	Kim Ki-duk	Pietà	
33	2013	Bong Joon-ho	Snowpiercer	
34	2014	Zhang Lu	Gyeongju	
35	2015	Ryoo Seung-wan	Veteran	
36	2016	Lee Kyoung-mi	The Truth Beneath	
37	2017	Hwang Dong-hyuk	The Fortress	
38	2018	Yoon Jong-bin	The Spy Gone North	
39	2019	Bong Joon-ho	Parasite	
40	2020	Lim Dae-hyung	Moonlit Winter	
41	2021	Ryoo Seung-wan	Escape from Mogadishu	
42	2022	Park Chan-wook	Decision to Leave	
43	2023	Ka Sung-moon	Dream Palace	
44	2024	Kim Sung-su	12.12: The Day	
45	2025	Jang Byung-ki	When This Summer is Over	
46	2026	Na Hong-jin	Hope	

== Best Actor ==
#	Year	Actor	Film	Ref.
1	1980	Choi Bool-am	The Last Witness	
2	1981	Jeon Moo-song	Mandala	
3	1983	Ahn Sung-ki	Polluted Ones	
4	1984	Ahn Sung-ki	Village in the Mist	
5	1985	Hah Myung-joong	Blazing Sun	
6	1986	Lee Dae-geun	Mulberry	
7	1987	Shin Seong-il	Lethe's Love Song	
8	1988	Yu In-chon	Diary of King Yeonsan	
9	1989	Park Joong-hoon	Chilsu and Mansu	
10	1990	Park Joong-hoon	The Lovers of Woomook-baemi	
11	1991	Lee Young-ha	Only Because You Are a Woman	
12	1992	Moon Sung-keun	Road to the Racetrack	
13	1993	Kim Myung-gon	Sopyonje	
14	1994	Ahn Sung-ki	Two Cops	
15	1995	Ahn Sung-ki	The Eternal Empire	
16	1996	Ahn Sung-ki	Festival	
17	1997	Han Suk-kyu	Green Fish	
18	1998	Song Kang-ho	No. 3	
19	1999	Lee Jung-jae	City of the Rising Sun	
20	2000	Park Joong-hoon	Nowhere to Hide	
21	2001	Choi Min-sik	Failan	
22	2002	Sul Kyung-gu	Oasis	
23	2003	Song Kang-ho	Memories of Murder	
24	2004	Choi Min-sik	Oldboy	
25	2005	Lee Byung-hun	A Bittersweet Life	
26	2006	Ahn Sung-ki	Radio Star	
27	2007	Song Kang-ho	The Show Must Go On	
28	2008	So Ji-sub	Rough Cut	
29	2009	Lee Beom-soo	Lifting King Kong	
30	2010	Gang Dong-won	Secret Reunion	
31	2011	Ha Jung-woo	The Yellow Sea	
32	2012	Ahn Sung-ki	Unbowed	
33	2013	Song Kang-ho	The Face Reader	
34	2014	Choi Min-sik	The Admiral: Roaring Currents	
35	2015	Jung Jae-young	Right Now, Wrong Then	
36	2016	Lee Byung-hun	Inside Men	
37	2017	Sul Kyung-gu	The Merciless	
38	2018	Lee Sung-min	The Spy Gone North	
39	2019	Shin Ha-kyun	Inseparable Bros	
40	2020	Lee Byung-hun	The Man Standing Next	
41	2021	Sul Kyung-gu	The Book of Fish	
42	2022	Jung Woo-sung	Hunt	
43	2023	Ryu Jun-yeol	The Night Owl	
44	2024	Lee Hee-joon	Handsome Guys	
45	2025	Park Jeong-min	The Ugly	
46	2026	Zo In-sung	Hope	

== Best Actress ==
#	Year	Actress	Film	Ref.
1	1980	Chang Mi-hee	Neumi	
2	1981	Woo Yeon-jeong	I Will Stand in Front of You Again	
3	1983	Na Young-hee	Sea Gull, Don't Fly Away	
4	1984	Won Mi-kyung	Mulleya Mulleya	
5	1985	Lee Mi-sook	The Winter That Year Was Warm	
6	1986	Lee Mi-sook	Mulberry	
7	1987	Kim Ji-mee	Ticket	
8	1988	Lee Bo-hee	You My Rose Mellow	
9	1989	Kang Soo-yeon	Come Come Come Upward	
10	1990	Kang Soo-yeon	All That Falls Has Wings	
11	1991	Lee Hye-sook	Silver Stallion	
12	1992	Yoon Jeong-hee	Flower in Snow	
13	1993	Shim Hye-jin	Marriage Story	
14	1994	Kim Seo-ra	The Story of Two Women	
15	1995	Choi Myung-gil	Rosy Life	
16	1996	Bang Eun-jin	301, 302	
17	1997	Kim Seon-jae	Time Lasts	
18	1998	Shim Eun-ha	Christmas in August	
19	1999	Lee Mi-sook	An Affair	
20	2000	Jeon Do-yeon	Happy End	
21	2001	Bae Doona	Take Care of My Cat	
22	2002	Moon So-ri	Oasis	
23	2003	Lee Mi-sook	Untold Scandal	
24	2004	Yum Jung-ah	The Big Swindle	
25	2005	Jeon Do-yeon	You Are My Sunshine	
26	2006	Jang Jin-young	Blue Swallow	
27	2007	Jeon Do-yeon	Secret Sunshine	
28	2008	Soo Ae	Sunny	
29	2009	Kim Hye-ja	Mother	
30	2010	Seo Young-hee	Bedevilled	
31	2011	Tang Wei	Late Autumn	
32	2012	Jo Min-su	Pietà	
33	2013	Uhm Ji-won	Hope	
34	2014	Chun Woo-hee	Han Gong-ju	
35	2015	Kim Hye-soo	Coin Locker Girl	
36	2016	Son Ye-jin	The Truth Beneath	
37	2017	Na Moon-hee	I Can Speak	
38	2018	Han Ji-min	Miss Baek	
39	2019	Kim Hyang-gi	Innocent Witness	
40	2020	Jung Yu-mi	Kim Ji-young: Born 1982	
41	2021	Moon So-ri	Three Sisters	
42	2022	Tang Wei	Decision to Leave	
43	2023	Kim Seo-hyung	Green House	
44	2024	Kim Jae-hwa	Blesser	
45	2025	Jang Sun	Red Nails	
46	2026	Jeon Do-yeon	Possible Love	

== Best Supporting Actor ==
#	Year	Actor	Film	Ref.
33	2013	Jo Jung-suk	The Face Reader	
34	2014	Kwak Do-won	The Attorney	
37	2017	Yoo Hae-jin	A Taxi Driver	
38	2018	Ju Ji-hoon	The Spy Gone North	
39	2019	Jin Seon-kyu	Extreme Job	
40	2020	Park Jeong-min	Deliver Us from Evil	
41	2021	Huh Joon-ho	Escape from Mogadishu	
42	2022	Jo Woo-jin	Kingmaker	
43	2023	Kim Jong-su	Smugglers	
44	2024	Hyun Bong-sik	Victory	
45	2025	Park Hee-soon	No Other Choice	
46	2026	Oh Jung-se	Wild Sing	

== Best Supporting Actress ==
#	Year	Actress	Film	Ref.
33	2013	Park Shin-hye	Miracle in Cell No. 7	
34	2014	Jo Yeo-jeong	Obsessed	
37	2017	Jeon Hye-jin	The Merciless	
38	2018	Kwon So-hyun	Miss Baek	
39	2019	Kim Sae-byuk	House of Hummingbird	
40	2020	Kim Mi-kyung	Kim Ji-young: Born 1982	
41	2021	Kim Sun-young	Three Sisters	
42	2022	Jeon Hye-jin	Hunt	
43	2023	Lee Yoon-ji	Dream Palace	
44	2024	Yeom Hye-ran	Citizen of a Kind	
45	2025	Kim Geum-soon	Yadang: The Snitch	
46	2026	Ye Soo-jung	People and Meat	

== Best New Director ==
#	Year	Director	Film	Ref.
6	1986	Kwak Ji-kyoon	Winter Wanderer	
7	1987	—N/a		
8	1988	Lee Kyu-hyung		
9	1989	Park Kwang-su	Chilsu and Mansu	
10	1990	Kang Woo-suk	Happiness Does Not Come In Grades	
11	1991	Hwang Qu-duk	Our Class Accepts Anyone Regardless of Grade	
12	1992	Kim Young-bin	Kim's War	
13	1993	Hong Ki-seon	Sorrow, Like a Withdrawn Dagger, Left My Heart	
14	1994	Lee Jung-gook	The Story of Two Women	
15	1995	Kim Hong-joon	Rosy Life	
16	1996	Hong Sang-soo	The Day a Pig Fell into the Well	
17	1997	Lee Chang-dong	Green Fish	
18	1998	Chang Yoon-hyun	The Contact	
19	1999	Lee Jeong-hyang	Art Museum by the Zoo	
20	2000	Jung Ji-woo	Happy End	
21	2001	Song Il-gon	Flower Island	
22	2002	Kim In-shik	Road Movie	
23	2003	Jang Joon-hwan	Save the Green Planet!	
24	2004	Choi Dong-hoon	The Big Swindle	
25	2005	Bang Eun-jin	Princess Aurora	
26	2006	Kim Dae-woo	Forbidden Quest	
27	2007	Jung Sik, Jung Beom-sik	Epitaph	
28	2008	Jang Hoon	Rough Cut	
29	2009	Kang Hyeong-cheol	Scandal Makers	
30	2010	Jang Cheol-soo	Bedevilled	
31	2011	Park Jung-bum	The Journals of Musan	
32	2012	Shin A-ga, Lee Sang-cheol	Jesus Hospital	
33	2013	Huh Jung	Hide and Seek	
34	2014	Yang Woo-suk	The Attorney	
35	2015	Kim Tae-yong	Set Me Free	
36	2016	Yoon Ga-eun	The World of Us	
37	2017	Kang Yoon-sung	The Outlaws	
38	2018	Jeon Go-woon	Microhabitat	
39	2019	Kim Bora	House of Hummingbird	
40	2020	Yoon Dan-bi	Moving On	
41	2021	Hong Eui-jeong	Voice of Silence	
42	2022	Lee Jung-jae	Hunt	
43	2023	Ahn Tae-jin	The Night Owl	
44	2024	Cho Hyun-chul	The Dream Songs	
45	2025	Park Joon-ho	3670	
46	2026	Kim Bo-sol	The Square	

== Best New Actor ==
#	Year	Actor	Film	Ref.
1	1980	Jung Han-yong	Outsiders	
2	1981	—N/a		
3	1983	—N/a		
4	1984	—N/a		
5	1985	—N/a		
6	1986	—N/a		
7	1987	—N/a		
8	1988	—N/a		
9	1989	—N/a		
10	1990	Lee Geung-young	Kuro Arirang	
11	1991	—N/a		
12	1992	—N/a		
13	1993	—N/a		
14	1994	Kim Byung-se	Rosy Days	
15	1995	Lee Jung-jae	The Young Man	
16	1996	—N/a		
17	1997	Jung Woo-sung	Beat	
18	1998	Park Shin-yang	The Letter	
19	1999	Lee Sung-jae	Art Museum by the Zoo	
20	2000	Sul Kyung-gu	Peppermint Candy	
21	2001	Yang Dong-geun	Address Unknown	
22	2002	Hwang Jung-min	Road Movie	
23	2003	Park Hae-il	Jealousy Is My Middle Name	
24	2004	Gang Dong-won	Temptation of Wolves	
25	2005	Ha Jung-woo	The Unforgiven	
26	2006	Lee Yeong-hoon	No Regret	
27	2007	Daniel Henney	My Father	
28	2008	Kang Ji-hwan	Rough Cut	
29	2009	Choi Jae-woong	The Sword with No Name	
30	2010	Song Sae-byeok	The Servant	
31	2011	Lee Je-hoon	The Front Line	
32	2012	Kim Sung-kyun	The Neighbor	
33	2013	Yeo Jin-goo	Hwayi: A Monster Boy	
34	2014	Park Yoochun	Haemoo	
35	2015	Choi Woo-shik	Set Me Free	
36	2016	—N/a		
37	2017	Park Seo-joon	Midnight Runners	
38	2018	Nam Joo-hyuk	The Great Battle	
39	2019	Park Hyung-sik	Juror 8	
40	2020	Kwak Min-gyu	Move The Grave	
41	2021	Lee Hong-nae	Made on the Rooftop	
42	2022	Son Suk-ku	The Roundup	
43	2023	Park Jin-young	A Christmas Carol	
44	2024	Lee Do-hyun	Exhuma	
45	2025	Cho You-hyun	3670	
46	2026	Park Ji-hoon	The King's Warden	

== Best New Actress ==
#	Year	Actress	Film	Ref.
1	1980	—N/a		
2	1981	Na Young-hee	Children of Darkness	
3	1983	—N/a		
4	1984	Lee Bo-hee	Declaration of Fools	
5	1985	—N/a		
6	1986	—N/a		
7	1987	—N/a		
8	1988	—N/a		
9	1989	Jin Yeong-mi	Come Come Come Upward	
10	1990	Lee Mi-yeon	Happiness Does Not Come In Grades	
11	1991	Choi Jin-sil	My Love, My Bride	
12	1992	Lee A-ro	Stairway to Heaven	
13	1993	Oh Jeong-hae	Sopyonje	
14	1994	Park Sun-young	The Man with Breasts	
15	1995	Lee Ji-eun	My Dear Keum-hong	
16	1996	Lee Jung-hyun	A Petal	
17	1997	Lee Hye-eun	Corset	
18	1998	Jeon Do-yeon	The Contact	
19	1999	Yunjin Kim	Shiri	
20	2000	Kim Min-sun, Park Ye-jin, Lee Young-jin	Memento Mori	
21	2001	Seo Joo-hee	Flower Island	
22	2002	Son Ye-jin	Lovers' Concerto	
23	2003	Im Soo-jung	A Tale of Two Sisters	
24	2004	Kang Hye-jung	Oldboy	
25	2005	Jung Yu-mi	Blossom Again	
26	2006	Han Hyo-joo	Ad-lib Night	
27	2007	Park Si-yeon	A Love	
28	2008	Seo Woo	Crush and Blush	
29	2009	Park Bo-young	Scandal Makers	
30	2010	Lee Min-jung	White Night	
31	2011	Yoo Da-in	Re-encounter	
32	2012	Kim Go-eun	A Muse	
33	2013	Jung Eun-chae	Nobody's Daughter Haewon	
34	2014	Lim Ji-yeon	Obsessed	
35	2015	Kwon So-hyun	Madonna	
36	2016	Jeong Ha-dam	Steel Flower	
37	2017	Choi Hee-seo	Anarchist from Colony	
38	2018	Kim Ga-hee	Park Hwayoung	
39	2019	Park Ji-hu	House of Hummingbird	
40	2020	Kang Mal-geum	Lucky Chan-sil	
41	2021	Gong Seung-yeon	Aloners	
42	2022	Lee Ji-eun	Broker	
43	2023	Kim Si-eun	Next Sohee	
44	2024	Kim Hyeong-seo	Hopeless	
45	2025	Na Ae-jin	Silver Apricot	
46	2026	Seo Su-bin	The World of Love	

== Best Screenplay ==
#	Year	Screenwriter	Film	Ref.
1	1980	—N/a		
2	1981	Yoon Sam-yook	The Hut	
3	1983	Song Kil-han	Sea Gull, Don't Fly Away	
4	1984	Im Choong	Mulleya Mulleya	
5	1985	Yoon Sam-yook, Heo Jin	The King's Poison	
6	1986	Song Kil-han	Gilsoddeum	
7	1987	Choi Geum-dong	Jung-kwang's Nonsense	
8	1988	Bae Chang-ho	Our Joyful Young Days	
9	1989	Jang Sun-woo	The Age of Success	
10	1990	Kwon Jae-woo	The Rooster	
11	1991	Lee Myung-se	My Love, My Bride	
12	1992	Park Kwang-su	Berlin Report	
13	1993	Hong Ki-seon	Sorrow, Like a Withdrawn Dagger, Left My Heart	
14	1994	Yoon Sam-yook	I Will Survive	
15	1995	Yook Sang-hyo	Rosy Life	
16	1996	Bae Chang-ho	Love Story	
17	1997	Lee Chang-dong	Green Fish	
18	1998	—N/a		
19	1999	Kang Je-gyu	Shiri	
20	2000	Lee Chang-dong	Peppermint Candy	
21	2001	Kim Ki-duk	Address Unknown	
22	2002	Park Chan-wook	Sympathy for Mr. Vengeance	
23	2003	Im Sang-soo	A Good Lawyer's Wife	
24	2004	Kim Ki-duk	3-Iron	
25	2005	Lee Won-jae, Kim Seong-je	Blood Rain	
26	2006	Kim Dae-woo	Forbidden Quest	
27	2007	Hur Jin-ho	Happiness	
28	2008	Hong Sang-soo	Night and Day	
29	2009	Park Eun-kyo, Bong Joon-ho	Mother	
30	2010	Lee Chang-dong	Poetry	
31	2011	Park Sang-yeon	The Front Line	
32	2012	Yoon Jong-bin	Nameless Gangster: Rules of the Time	
33	2013	Shin Yeon-shick	The Russian Novel	
34	2014	Lee Su-jin	Han Gong-ju	
35	2015	Cho Chul-hyun, Oh Seung-hyeon, Lee Song-won	The Throne	
36	2016	Shin Yeon-shick	Dongju: The Portrait of a Poet	
37	2017	Hwang Seong-gu	Anarchist from Colony	
38	2018	Kwak Kyung-taek, Kim Tae-gyun	Dark Figure of Crime	
39	2019	Yook Sang-hyo	Inseparable Bros	
40	2020	Lim Dae-hyung	Moonlit Winter	
41	2021	Kim Se-gyeom	The Book of Fish	
42	2022	Park Chan-wook, Jeong Seo-kyeong	Decision to Leave	
43	2023	Kim Hyun-jung	Flow	
44	2024	Kim Da-min	FAQ	
45	2025	The Final Semester	Lee Ran-hee	
46	2026	Good News	Byun Sung-hyun, Lee Jin-seong	

== Best Cinematography ==
#	Year	Cinematographer	Film	Ref.
1	1980	Jung Il-sung		
2	1981	Jung Il-sung	Mandala	
3	1983	Jeong Kwang-seok	People of Kkobang Neighborhood	
4	1984	Lee Seong-chun	Mulleya Mulleya	
5	1985	—N/a		
6	1986	—N/a		
7	1987	Koo Joong-mo	The Surrogate Woman	
8	1988	Park Seung-bae	The Man with Three Coffins	
9	1989	Seo Jeong-min	Rainbow Over Seoul	
10	1990	Yoo Young-gil	The Lovers of Woomook-baemi	
11	1991	Yoo Young-gil	Black Republic	
12	1992	Jung Il-sung	Road to the Racetrack	
13	1993	Jung Il-sung	Sopyonje	
14	1994	Yoo Young-gil	Hwa-Om-Kyung	
15	1995	Chun Jo-myoung	The Eternal Empire	
16	1996	Yoo Young-gil	A Petal	
16	1996	Park Hee-ju	The Gingko Bed	
17	1997	Kim Hyung-koo	Beat	
18	1998	Yoo Young-gil	Christmas in August	
19	1999	Kim Hyung-koo	Spring in My Hometown	
20	2000	Jung Il-sung	Chunhyang	
21	2001	Kim Hyung-koo	One Fine Spring Day	
22	2002	Jung Il-sung	Chi-hwa-seon	
23	2003	Lee Mo-gae	A Tale of Two Sisters	
24	2004	Hong Kyung-pyo	Taegukgi	
25	2005	Choi Young-hwan	Blood Rain	
26	2006	Yoon Hong-sik	Blue Swallow	
27	2007	Lee Du-nam	May 18	
28	2008	Byun Hee-sung	The Divine Weapon	
29	2009	Kim Young-ho	Haeundae	
30	2010	Choi Young-hwan	Jeon Woo-chi: The Taoist Wizard	
31	2011	Kim Tae-seong, Park Jong-chul	War of the Arrows	
32	2012	Choi Young-hwan	The Thieves	
33	2013	Hong Kyung-pyo	Snowpiercer	
34	2014	Choi Chan-min	Kundo: Age of the Rampant	
35	2015	Kim Woo-hyung	Assassination	
36	2016	Chung Chung-hoon	The Handmaiden	
37	2017	Kim Jee-yong	The Fortress	
38	2018	Hong Kyung-pyo	Burning	
39	2019	Hong Kyung-pyo	Parasite	
40	2020	Lee Hyung-deok	Peninsula	
41	2021	Choi Young-hwan	Escape from Mogadishu	
42	2022	Kim Ji-yong	Decision to Leave	
43	2023	Kim Tae-kyung	The Night Owl	
44	2024	Rodrigo Seh Park	Ms. Apocalypse	
46	2026	Hong Kyung-pyo	Hope	

== Best Music ==
#	Year	Composer	Film	Ref.
1	1980	Han Seong-ki		
2	1981	—N/a		
3	1983	Kim Young-dong	Polluted Ones	
4	1984	—N/a		
5	1985	—N/a		
6	1986	—N/a		
7	1987	Jung Sung-jo	Lethe's Love Story	
8	1988	Shin Byung-ha	You My Rose Mellow	
9	1989	Kim Jeong-ki	Come Come Come Upward	
10	1990	Kang In-won	Watercolor Painting in a Rainy Day	
11	1991	Kim Soo-chul	Black Republic	
12	1992	Jang Il-nam	Blood and Fire	
13	1993	Kim Soo-chul	Sopyonje	
14	1994	Lee Jong-gu	Hwa-Om-Kyung	
15	1995	Hwang Byungki	The Eternal Empire	
16	1996	Ok Kil-sung	The Day a Pig Fell into the Well	
17	1997	—N/a		
18	1998	Choi Man-sik, Jo Yeong-wook	The Contact	
19	1999	Won Il	Spring in My Hometown	
20	2000	Jo Seong-woo	Nowhere to Hide	
21	2001	Choi Kyung-shik	The Last Witness	
22	2002	Kim Dae-hong, Kim Yang-hee	The Way Home	
23	2003	Lee Byung-woo	Untold Scandal	
24	2004	Jo Yeong-wook	Oldboy	
25	2005	Jang Young-gyu, Dalpalan	A Bittersweet Life	
26	2006	Bang Jun-seok	Radio Star	
27	2007	Kunihiko Ryo	Beyond the Years	
28	2008	Kim Tae-seong	Crossing	
29	2009	Lee Jae-hak	Take Off	
30	2010	Kim Hong-jib	The Housemaid	
31	2011	Jo Seong-woo, Choi Yeong-rok	Late Autumn	
32	2012	Lee Ji-soo	Architecture 101	
33	2013	Lee Byung-woo	The Face Reader	
34	2014	Jo Yeong-wook	Kundo: Age of the Rampant	
35	2015	Bang Jun-seok	The Throne	
36	2016	Mowg	The Age of Shadows	
37	2017	Ryuichi Sakamoto	The Fortress	
38	2018	Kim Tae-sung	1987: When the Day Comes	
39	2019	Kim Jun-suk	Swing Kids	
40	2020	Kim Hae-won	Moonlit Winter	
41	2021	Bang Jun-seok	Escape from Mogadishu	
42	2022	Jo Yeong-wook	Decision to Leave	
43	2023	Chang Kiha	Smugglers	
44	2024	Dalpalan	Escape	
46	2026	Minhwi Lee	Pavane	

== Technical Award ==
#	Year	Recipient	Film	Ref.
1	1980	Go Hye-jin		
2	1981	Lee Kyung-ja (editing)	The Hut	
3	1983	—N/a		
4	1984	—N/a		
5	1985	—N/a		
6	1986	Kang Kwang-hee (lighting)	Into the Heat of the Night	
7	1987	—N/a		
8	1988	—N/a		
9	1989	Kim Byeong-su (sound)	Come Come Come Upward	
10	1990	Yang Dae-ho (sound effects)	Korean Connection	
11	1991	Do Yong-woo (art direction)	The General's Son	
12	1992	Hyeon Dong-chun (editing)	Death Song	
13	1993	Cho Young-sam (art direction)	First Love	
14	1994	Cha Jung-nam (lighting)	Rosy Days	
15	1995	Kim Hyeon (editing)	The Rules of the Game	
16	1996	Shin Cine Graphics (visual effects)	The Gingko Bed	
17	1997	Lee Kang-san	Beat	
18	1998	Yoon Woong-won (art direction)	The Quiet Family	
18	1998	Im Jae-young (lighting)	The Contact	
19	1999	Park Gok-ji (editing)	Shiri	
20	2000	Yoo Dong-ryeol (visual effects)	Phantom: The Submarine	
21	2001	Ahn Byeong-geun (editing)	Die Bad	
22	2002	Kang Seung-yong, Oh Sang-man (art direction)	YMCA Baseball Team	
23	2003	Jang Geun-young (art direction), Kim Kyung-hee (costume design)	Save the Green Planet!	
24	2004	Jeong Do-an (special effects)	Taegukgi	
25	2005	—N/a	Blood Rain	
26	2006	Cho Geun-hyun (art direction)	Forbidden Quest	
27	2007	Yoon Sang-yoon, Yoo Joo-ho (art direction)	M	
28	2008	Jo Sang-gyeong (art direction)	Modern Boy	
29	2009	Jeong Seong-jin (visual effects)	Take Off	
30	2010	Park Il-hyun (art direction)	The Servant	
31	2011	Han Young-woo (visual effects)	War of the Arrows	
32	2012	Oh Heung-seok (art direction)	Masquerade	
33	2013	Jeong Seong-jin (visual effects)	Mr. Go	
34	2014	Jang Choon-seob (art direction)	The Admiral: Roaring Currents	
35	2015	Ryu Seong-hee (art direction)	Assassination	
36	2016	—N/a	Train to Busan	
37	2017	Lee Hwo-kyoung (art direction)	The Battleship Island	
38	2018	Jin Jong-hyun (visual effects)	Along with the Gods: The Two Worlds	
39	2019	Park Il-hyun (art direction)	Swing Kids	
40	2020	Jeong Do-an (special effects)	Peninsula	
41	2021	Jeong Seong-jin, Jeong Chol-min (VFX)	Space Sweepers	
42	2022	Jeong Seong-jin, Jeong Chol-min (VFX)	Hansan: Rising Dragon	
43	2023	Lee Hoo-kyung	Smugglers	
44	2024	Jeong I-jin (art direction)	Cobweb	
46	2026	Kim Young-ho (sound)	Salmokji: Whispering Water	

== Best Independent Film Maker ==
#	Year	Film	Director	Ref.
34	2014	Futureless Things	Kim Kyung-mook	
36	2016	Tour of Duty	Kim Dong-ryung, Park Kyoung-tae	
37	2017	Troublers	Lee Young	
37	2017	Jane	Cho Hyun-hoon	
38	2018	Kim Il-ran	Lee Hyuk-sang	
39	2019	House of Hummingbird	Kim Bora	
39	2019	Kim-Gun	Kang Sang-woo	
40	2020	Han Ka-ram	Our Body	
40	2020	Kim Mi-re	East Asia Anti-Japan Armed Front	
41	2021	Park Yun-jin	People in Elancia	
41	2021	Kim Mi-jo	Gull	
42	2022	Kim Dong-ryeong, Park Gyeong-tae	The Pregnant Tree And The Goblin	
42	2022	Lee Il-ha	I am More	
43	2023	Kim Sae-in (Feature Film Category)	The Apartment with Two Women	
43	2023	Yang Young-hee (Documentary Category)	Soup and Ideology	
44	2024	Jeong Ji-hye (Feature Film Category)	Jeong-Sun	
44	2024	Sun Seon-bin, Nabaru (Documentary Category)	FC Sukhavati	

== FIPRESCI Award ==
#	Year	Film	Director(s)	Ref.
26	2006	Grain in Ear	Zhang Lu	
28	2008	My Dear Enemy	Lee Yoon-ki	
29	2009	Breathless	Yang Ik-june	
30	2010	A Brand New Life	Ounie Lecomte	
31	2011	Poongsan	Juhn Jai-hong	
32	2012	Pietà	Kim Ki-duk	
33	2013	Jiseul	O Muel	
34	2014	The Fake	Yeon Sang-ho	
35	2015	A Midsummer's Fantasia	Jang Kun-jae	
37	2017	Okja	Bong Joon-ho	
38	2018	Burning	Lee Chang-dong	
39	2019	House of Hummingbird	Kim Bora	
40	2020	The Woman Who Ran	Hong Sang-soo	
41	2021	The Book of Fish	Lee Joon-ik	
42	2022	Cassiopeia (Domestic)	Shin Yeon-shick	
42	2022	After Yang (Foreign)	Kogonada	
42	2022	Blue Bayou (Foreign)	Justin Chon	
43	2023	The Hill of Secrets (Domestic)	Lee Ji-eun	
43	2023	Riceboy Sleeps (Foreign)	Anthony Shim	
44	2024	Concerning My Daughter (Domestic)	Lee Mi-rang	
44	2024	Free Chol Soo Lee (Foreign)	Julie Ha and Eugene Yi	
45	2025	No Other Choice (Domestic)	Park Chan-wook	
45	2025	KPop Demon Hunters (Foreign)	Maggie Kang and Chris Appelhans	
46	2026	People and Meat (Domestic)	Yang Jong-hyun	
46	2026	Kokuho (Foreign)	Sang-il Lee	

== Special Mention ==
#	Year	Recipient	Film	Ref.
1	1980	Jung Jin-woo		
6	1986	Hwang Gi-seong	Mother	
7	1987	Kang Dae-jin		
7	1987	Kang Soo-yeon		
8	1988	Lee Tae-won (Taehung Pictures)		
9	1989	Kim So-dong		
10	1990	Lee Tae-won		
10	1990	—N/a	Why Has Bodhi-Dharma Left for the East?	
13	1993	Do Dong-hwan		
13	1993	Kim Hee-gap		
17	1997	Kim Soo-jung (animation)		
17	1997	Lee Kyung-soon (sound recording)		
19	1999	Kang Je-gyu, Byeon Mu-rim	Shiri	
20	2000	Byun Young-joo	My Own Breathing	
21	2001	—N/a	Friend	
22	2002	Jung So-young	Love Me Once Again	
24	2004	Kim Dong-won	Repatriation	
31	2011	Shim Jae-myung	Leafie, A Hen into the Wild	
32	2012	Oh Heung-seok (art direction)	Masquerade	
33	2013	Park Chul-soo		
38	2018	Hong Ki-seon	The Discloser	

== Lifetime achievement award ==
#	Year	Recipient	Ref.
3	1983	Seok Geum-seong (Sea Gull, Don't Fly Away)	
11	1991	Shin Seong-il	
11	1991	Hwang Gi-seong	
12	1992	Lee Woo-seok (Dong-A Export Co.)	
12	1992	Lee Chang-geun (senior cameraman)	
14	1994	Chung Ji-young	
15	1995	Lee Chang-geun	
16	1996	Boim (The Murmuring)	
18	1998	Kim Ki-young	
20	2000	Kim Ji-mee	
25	2005	Kim Jong-won	
25	2005	Byun In-shik	
26	2006	Lee Kyung-ja	
28	2008	Choi Eun-hee	
34	2014	Jung Il-sung (cinematographer)	
35	2015	Jung Jin-woo (director)	
38	2018	Yoon Jeong-hee (actress)	
39	2019	Um Aing-ran (actress)	
40	2020	Kim Jong-won (critic)	
41	2021	Yoon Il-bong	

== Award for Contribution to Cinema ==
#	Year	Recipient	Ref.
27	2007	Yu Hyun-mok	
29	2009	Kim Soo-yong	
30	2010	Shin Young-kyun	
30	2010	Jo Kwon-hee	
31	2011	Jeong Chang-hwa	
32	2012	Hwang Jeong-sun	
33	2013	Shin Seong-il	
36	2016	Im Kwon-taek	

== Other Awards ==
#	Year	Award	Recipient	Film	Ref.
33	2013	CJ CGV Star Award	Lee Jung-jae	The Face Reader, New World	
35	2015	Special Appreciation Plaque	Ahn Sung-ki		
42	2022	Korean Association of Film 10 selections of Kim Hyun-seung		Hansan: Rising Dragon	

== Best New Critic ==
#	Year	Critic	Ref.
29	2009	Ahn Seung-beom	
29	2009	Park Woo-sung	
30	2010	Lee Ji-hyun	
31	2011	Yoon Sung-eun	
32	2012	Lee Dae-yeon	
33	2013	Sung Jin-soo	
33	2013	Lee Soo-hyang	
34	2014	Song A-reum	
35	2015	Moon Sung-hoon	
38	2018	Cho Han-ki	
41	2021	Jung Woo-sung	
42	2022	Kim Hyun-seung	

== Best Foreign Film ==
#	Year	Film	Director	Ref.
1	1980	Kramer vs. Kramer	Robert Benton	
2	1981	Tess	Roman Polanski	
3	1983	Close Encounters of the Third Kind	Steven Spielberg	
4	1984	The Woman Next Door	François Truffaut	
