= 41st Grand Bell Awards =

2004 edition of award ceremony

- Official poster
- Date: June 4, 2004
- Site: Sejong Center for the Performing Arts, Seoul

The 41st Grand Bell Awards ceremony was held at the Sejong Center for the Performing Arts in Seoul on June 4, 2004.

== Nominations and winners ==
(Winners denoted in bold)

Best Film	Best Director
**Spring, Summer, Fall, Winter... and Spring**; A Good Lawyer's Wife; Oldboy; Silmido; Untold Scandal	**Park Chan-wook** - **Oldboy**; E J-yong - Untold Scandal; Kang Je-gyu - Taegukgi; Kang Woo-suk - Silmido; Kim Ki-duk - Spring, Summer, Fall, Winter... and Spring
Best Actor	Best Actress
**Choi Min-sik** - **Oldboy**; Jang Dong-gun - Taegukgi; Park Shin-yang - The Big Swindle; Ryoo Seung-bum - Arahan; Yang Dong-geun - Wild Card	**Moon So-ri** - **A Good Lawyer's Wife**; Jeon Do-yeon - Untold Scandal; Kim Ha-neul - Too Beautiful to Lie; Lee Mi-sook - Untold Scandal; Yum Jung-ah - A Tale of Two Sisters
Best Supporting Actor	Best Supporting Actress
**Huh Joon-ho** - **Silmido**; Ahn Suk-hwan - The Road Taken; Chun Ho-jin - The Big Swindle; Kim Soo-ro - Dance with the Wind; Lee Moon-sik - The Big Swindle	**Kim Ga-yeon** - **Mr. Handy**; Kim Soo-mi - The Greatest Expectation; Lee Kan-hee - Dance with the Wind; Yoo Sun - The Uninvited; Youn Yuh-jung - A Good Lawyer's Wife
Best New Actor	Best New Actress
**Kim Rae-won** - **My Little Bride**; Bae Yong-joon - Untold Scandal; Bong Tae-gyu - A Good Lawyer's Wife; Gong Hyung-jin - North Korean Guys; Gang Dong-won - Too Beautiful to Lie	**Moon Geun-young** - **My Little Bride**; Im Soo-jung - A Tale of Two Sisters; Kang Hye-jung - Oldboy; Kim Sun-a - The Greatest Expectation; Yoon So-yi - Arahan
Best New Director	Best Planning
**Choi Dong-hoon** - **The Big Swindle**; Kang Suk-bum - Mr. Handy; Lee Eon-hee - ...ing; Lee Soo-yeon - The Uninvited; Park Kyung-hee - A Smile	**Jonathan Kim** - **Silmido**; Jo Cheol-hyeon - Once Upon a Time in a Battlefield; Kang Je-gyu - Taegukgi; Lee Yoo-jin - Untold Scandal; Park Keon-seop - The Road Taken
Best Original Screenplay	Best Adapted Screenplay
**Choi Dong-hoon** - **The Big Swindle**; Im Sang-soo - A Good Lawyer's Wife; Kang Suk-bum, Shin Jung-goo - Mr. Handy; Lee Man-hee - Wild Card; Yoo Ha - Once Upon a Time in High School	**Kim Hee-jae** - **Silmido**; Kim Dae-woo, E J-yong, Kim Hyeon-jeong - Untold Scandal; Lee Youn-taek - Ogu: A Hilarious Mourning; Noh Hye-young - Singles; Park Chan-wook - Oldboy
Best Cinematography	Best Editing
**Hong Kyung-pyo** - **Taegukgi**; Chung Chung-hoon - Oldboy; Kim Byeong-il - Untold Scandal; Kim Woo-hyung - A Good Lawyer's Wife; Lee Mo-gae - A Tale of Two Sisters	**Kim Sang-bum** - **Oldboy**; Kim Hyeon - Wild Card; Ko Im-pyo - Silmido; Nam Na-yeong - Arahan; Park Gok-ji - Taegukgi; Shin Min-kyung - The Big Swindle
Best Art Direction	Best Lighting
**Shin Bo-kyeong, Kang Chang-gil, Kang Bo-kil** - **Taegukgi**; Cho Geun-hyun - A Tale of Two Sisters; Jang Geun-young, Kim Kyung-hee - Arahan; Jung Ku-ho - Untold Scandal; Ryu Seong-hui - Oldboy	**Park Hyun-won** - **Oldboy**; Go Nak-seon - A Good Lawyer's Wife; Oh Seung-chul - A Tale of Two Sisters; Park Jong-hwan - The Uninvited; Seo Jeong-dal - Arahan
Best Costume Design	Best Music
**Jung Ku-ho, Kim Hee-ju** - **Untold Scandal**; Kwon Yu-jin - Sword in the Moon; Lee Ja-young, Kim Jung-won - Taegukgi; Oh Seok-jun - Once Upon a Time in a Battlefield; Ok Su-gyeong - A Tale of Two Sisters	**Jo Yeong-wook** - **Oldboy**; Han Jae-kwon - Arahan; Lee Byung-woo - A Tale of Two Sisters; Lee Byung-woo - Untold Scandal; Lee Sang-ho - Dance with the Wind
Best Visual Effects	Best Sound Effects
**Moon Byeong-yong, Shin Jae-ho, Jeong Do-an** - **Natural City**; Kang Jong-ik, Jeong Do-an - Tube; Kang Jong-ik, Shin Jae-ho, Jeong Do-an - Taegukgi; Lee Jeon-hyeong, Shin Jae-ho, Jeong Do-an - Oldboy; Son Seung-hyeon, Shin Jae-ho, Jeong Do-an - Arahan	**Lee Tae-gyu, Kim Suk-won** - **Taegukgi**; Jeong Gun, Kim Suk-won (Blue Cap) - Arahan; Jung Kwang-ho, Korean Film Council - Natural City; Kim Kyung-taek, Choi Tae-young - A Tale of Two Sisters; Oh Se-jin, Blue Cap - Wild Card
Special Jury Prize	Popularity Award
**Plenus/Cinema Service** - **Silmido**	**Kwon Sang-woo** - **Once Upon a Time in High School**; **Moon Geun-young** - **My Little Bride**
Best Dressed
**Lee Mi-yeon**
