= The Last Witness =

The Last Witness may refer to:

- The Last Witness (1921 film), a German silent film
- The Last Witness (1925 film), a silent British film by Fred Paul
- The Last Witness (1960 film), a German film
- The Last Witness (1980 film), a South Korean film directed by Lee Doo-yong
- The Last Witness (1999 film), a made-for-TV movie directed by Graeme Clifford
- The Last Witness (2001 film), a South Korean film directed by Bae Chang-ho
- The Last Witness (2018 film), a British thriller film by Piotr Szkopiak
