= The Executioner (1975 film) =

- Theatrical release poster
- Hangul: 망나니
- RR: Mangnani
- MR: Mangnani
- Directed by: Byun Jang-ho
- Written by: Yoon Sam-yook
- Produced by: Kang Dae-jin
- Starring: Baek Il-seob; Park Ji-yeong
- Cinematography: Lee Seong-chun
- Edited by: Kim Yeong-hui
- Music by: Jeong Yoon-joo
- Distributed by: Sam Young Films Co., Ltd.
- Release date: April 12, 1975
- Running time: 86 minutes
- Country: South Korea
- Language: Korean

The Executioner (Korean: 망나니; RR: Mangnani) is a 1975 South Korean historical drama film directed by Byun Jang-ho. It was later remade as I Will Survive by Yoon Sam-yook, the original film's screenwriter.

== Plot ==
An executioner and his family try to survive from the dead.

== Cast ==
- Baek Il-seob
- Park Ji-yeong
- Heo Jang-kang
- Kim Mu-yeong
- Kim Nan-yeong

== Remake ==
The 1993 film I Will Survive is a remake of The Executioner, although there is a key difference, in which the main character Man-sook rapes Su-kyeong, the daughter of a nobleman whom he had executed. Despite this, Man-sook ultimately saves her from jail.
