= Lee Mi-sook =

South Korean actress (born 1960)

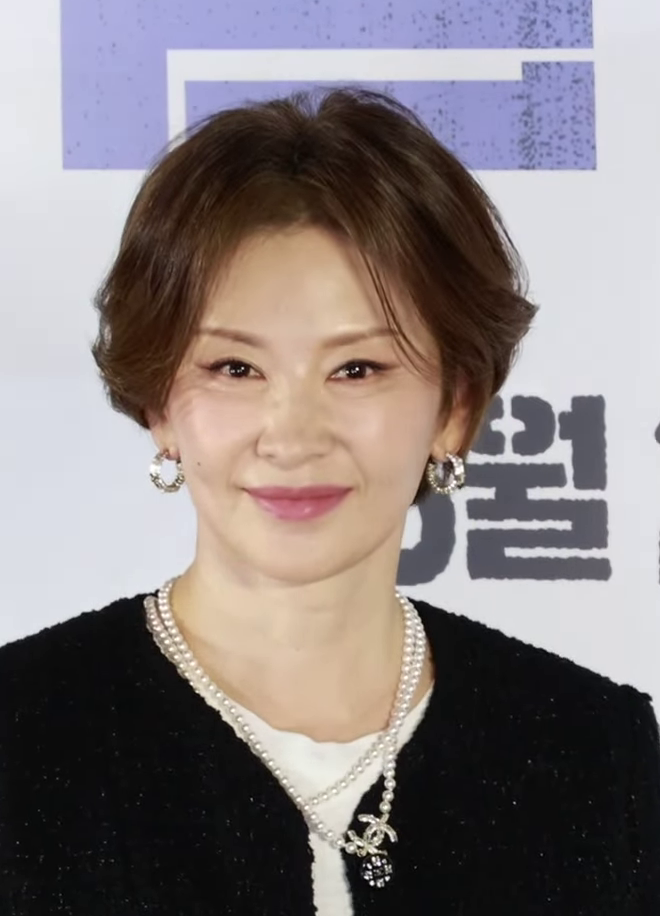
- Lee in April 2024
- Born: April 2, 1960 (age 66); Danyang County, North Chungcheong Province, South Korea
- Education: Korea University - Graduate School of Journalism and Mass Communication
- Occupation: Actress
- Years active: 1979–present
- Agent: Hunus Entertainment
- Spouse: Hong Sung-ho (m. 1987; div. 2007)
- Children: 2

Korean name
- Hangul: 이미숙
- Hanja: 李美淑
- RR: I Misuk
- MR: I Misuk

Lee Mi-sook (Korean: 이미숙; born April 2, 1960) is a South Korean actress. One of the best-known actresses of 1980s Korean cinema, Lee's most famous films from this era include Bae Chang-ho's Whale Hunting and The Winter That Year Was Warm, Lee Doo-yong's Mulberry and Eunuch, and Kwak Ji-kyoon's Wanderer in Winter. She retired from film after getting married in 1987, though she still appeared on television in dramas such as How's Your Husband? (1993). Then a decade later, Lee made her comeback with an award-winning leading role in E J-yong's feature debut An Affair (1998). She has since remained active in film and television, notably in the May–December romance Solitude (2002), the Dangerous Liaisons adaptation Untold Scandal (2003), the mockumentary Actresses (2009), the family dramas Smile, Mom (2010), and Queen of Tears (2024).

== Career ==
Lee Mi-sook debuted in film at the age of twenty in Thoughtless Momo in 1979. By the mid-1980s she had become one of the best-known actresses of her era. Together with Lee Bo-hee and Won Mi-kyung, they dominated the screen and were referred to as the "Troika of the 1980s." Her most famous films from this era include Bae Chang-ho's Whale Hunting and The Winter That Year Was Warm, Lee Doo-yong's Mulberry and Eunuch, and Kwak Ji-kyoon's Wanderer in Winter. Her early career lasted until the film Love Triangle in 1987, and then she retired from the cinema after getting married.

Over ten years later, in 1998, Lee returned with a widely praised role in E J-yong's award-winning film An Affair, about a woman who falls in love with her sister's fiancé. Using this film as a springboard, she re-launched her career.

In 2000, Lee was cast in the high-profile project The Legend of Gingko, which was considered to be production company Kang Je-gyu Film's followup to the successful Shiri (even though Kang himself was not directing). However the film proved to be a critical and commercial disappointment. Lee's next two films, Kiss Me Much and Oh! Lala Sisters, were also more or less ignored by audiences. In contrast, her appearances in TV dramas such as Solitude (2002) were more successful.

In 2003, Lee appeared in E J-yong's Untold Scandal, a retelling of the novel Dangerous Liaisons set in the Joseon period, and portrayed a single mother in Lee Eon-hee's melodrama ...ing.

Lee next starred in Hellcats, a 2008 romantic comedy that traces the lives and loves of three characters at different stages of womanhood. Then in 2009 Lee reunited with E J-yong in Actresses, a semi-improvisational mockumentary featuring six actresses each playing themselves.

In 2011, Lee launched her own lingerie line Starit, which was sold on home shopping channels. This would've been virtually unheard of in previous years with the fashion industry's historically narrow focus on young women. But since 2008 the sophisticated and stylish image of actresses such as Lee, Choi Myung-gil and Kim Hee-ae became aspirational for middle-aged women in Korea, and brands specifically targeting women in their 40s and 50s have increased. Lee remains a favorite in editorial spreads in fashion magazines, notably a 2010 Elle Korea feature opposite pop star TOP.

Lee continued to act on television, giving a vulgar, selfish, but human spin to her role as the stepmother in Cinderella's Sister, a ratings hit in 2010. 2012's Love Rain, a Yoon Seok-ho melodrama that jumps between the 1970s and the present, inked overseas distribution deals, but was unsuccessful domestically.

After a judging stint on reality acting talent program Miracle Audition, Lee hosted the cable talk show Bad Scene, which featured celebrities who reveal bad or embarrassing scenes from their past.

In August 2022, she left SidusHQ and signed with new agency Hunus Entertainment.

== Lawsuit ==
In 2012, Lee was embroiled in a controversy when she was sued by her former agency, The Contents Media, after she moved to a new agency, Hoya Spotainment. The Seoul High Court ruled that Lee was guilty of breach of contract and ordered her to pay ₩120 million (US$110,604) in damages. However, The Contents Media filed an appeal, stating that the agency was owed at least double the amount. They alleged that Lee had been involved in a romantic relationship with a man 17 years her junior in 2006, whom they claimed to have paid off in millions of won to keep him from talking to the press and tarnishing Lee's image. Lee counter-sued The Contents Media and the two reporters who broke the story for defamation. Lee lost her appeal in February 2013, and the Seoul High Court ruled for her to pay the amount in the original ruling.

In August 2013, she signed with another agency, SidusHQ.

== Personal life ==
In 2007, Lee and her husband Hong Sung-ho, a plastic surgeon, divorced after 20 years of marriage. They have a son and a daughter.

== Filmography ==
*Note; the whole list is referenced.

=== Film ===
Year	Title	Role
1980	Flame Bird	Eun-young
1980	Thoughtless Momo (aka An Innocent College Student)	Mal-ja
1981	Is There a Girl Like Her?	Yun Su-jin
1981	With Passion and Heat	Doh Do-hae
1981	An Embrace in the Dark Night	
1982	I Loved	
1982	Wild Horse	Lucia
1983	Strange Relationship	
1983	X	
1984	The Winter That Year Was Warm	Oh-mok / Soo-in
1984	The Broken Night	
1984	Whale Hunting	Chun-ja
1984	Women Wet Men Like Rain	
1984	Sleeping Out	
1985	Graduation Journey	Mi-seon
1985	When Tears Run Dry	
1985	City of Fast	
1986	Eunuch	Ja-ok
1986	Autumn After Love	
1986	Wanderer in Winter	Da-hye
1986	Mulberry	An-hyeop
1987	The Home of Two Women	Yoo-kyung
1987	Affection	
1987	A Street Musician	Seo-ha
1998	An Affair	Seo-hyun
2000	The Legend of Gingko	Soo
2001	Kiss Me Much	Young-hee
2002	Oh! LaLa Sisters	Jo Eun-ja
2003	...ing	Mi-sook
2003	Untold Scandal	Lady Cho
2008	Hellcats	Kim Young-mi
2009	Actresses	Lee Mi-sook
2013	Horny Family	Hye-kyung
2015	The Exclusive: Beat the Devil's Tattoo	News bureau head Baek
2018	Ode to the Goose	Dental clinic director
2024	The Plot	Jackie

=== Television series ===
Year	Title	Role	Notes/Ref.
1979	A Lonely Relationship		
1979	Mapo Harbor		
1980	A Sweet Neighborhood		
1981	Women's History: "Jang Hui-bin"	Jang Hui-bin	
1981	Embrace		
1981	Hello	Second daughter-in-law Eun-hee	
1982	Annals of Renunciation: "Yi Yong-ik"		
1982	Lingering Attachment	Kang Yeon-hee	
1982	Women's History: "Hwang Jin-yi"	Hwang Jini	
1983	Sunflower in Winter		
1983	That Star is My Star		
1984	I Miss		
1984	500 Years of Joseon: "The Ume Tree in the Midst of the Snow"	Jang Nok-su	
1984	Spray	Jang-hee	
1985	That's Right, You Bet	Ok-som	
1987	Firebird	Hyun-joo	
1988	The Land of Grace	Eun-hye	
1989	Wound	Ha-young	
1990	Emmy	Mother	
1991	Humble Men	Baek Jung-ran	
1992	Women's Room	Na Kyung-sun	
1993	How's Your Husband?	Ahn Jung-sook	
1994	The Goblin is Coming	Min Kang-ji	
1995	Elegy	Min Ji-sook	
1997	Snail	Yoon-joo	
1998	Crush	Young-ja	
1999	You Don't Know My Mind	Jeon Nam-ja	
1999	Queen	Hwang Choon-bok	
1999	Springtime		
2002	Solitude	Jo Kyung-min	
2005	Love and Sympathy	Kang Hee-soo	
2006	Great Inheritance	Go Ah-ra	
2009	Ja Myung Go	Wang Ja-shil	
2009	East of Eden	Yang Choon-hee	
2010	Smile, Mom	Jo Bok-hee	
2010	Cinderella's Stepsister	Song Kang-sook	
2011	A Thousand Days' Promise	Oh Hyun-ah	
2012	Can We Get Married?	Deul-ja	
2012	Love Rain	Kim Yoon-hee (2012)	
2013	Shining Romance	Jung Soon-ok	
2013	Miss Korea	Ma Ae-ri	
2013	You Are the Best!	Song Mi-ryung/Kim Kyung-sook	
2014	Rosy Lovers	Jung Shi-nae	
2014	Blade Man	Madam Yoon	
2016	Don't Dare to Dream	Kye Sung-sook	
2017	Money Flower	Jung Mal-ran	
2017	Temperature of Love	Yoo Yeong-mi	
2018	Let Me Introduce Her	Min Ja-young	
2018	Wok of Love	Jin Jung-hye / Kim Su-nyeo	
2022	The Law Cafe	Lee Yeon-joo	Cameo
2022	The Empire	Ham Kwang-jeon	
2023	Perfect Marriage Revenge	Cha Yeon-hwa	
2023	Family: The Unbreakable Bond	Butterfly	
2024	Queen of Tears	Mo Seul-hee	
2026	Tempest		

=== Variety shows ===
Year	Title	Role
2011	Miracle Audition	Judge
2011–2012	Lee Mi-sook's Bad Scene	Host
2013	Miracle Korea	Host
2017	Guesthouse Daughters	Permanent cast (Mom)

== Bibliography ==
- Lee Mi-sook's Diary: Dreaming of Deviation (이미숙의 DIARY 일탈을 꿈꾸며) (2003)

== Awards ==
Year	Award	Category	Nominated work
2017	MBC Drama Awards	Top Excellence Award, Actress in a Weekend Drama	Money Flower
2014	MBC Drama Awards	Golden Acting Award, Actress	Miss Korea, Shining Romance, Rosy Lovers
2013	KBS Drama Awards	Excellence Award, Actress in a Serial Drama	You Are the Best!
2011	SBS Drama Awards	Special Award, Actress in a Special Planning Drama	A Thousand Days' Promise
2008	MBC Drama Awards	Top Excellence Award, Actress	East of Eden
2003	23rd Korean Association of Film Critics Awards	Best Actress	Untold Scandal
2001	37th Baeksang Arts Awards	Most Popular Actress, Film category	The Legend of Gingko
1999	7th Chunsa Film Art Awards	Best Actress	An Affair
1999	19th Korean Association of Film Critics Awards	Best Actress	An Affair
1998	34th Baeksang Arts Awards	Most Popular Actress, TV category	Snail
1993	SBS Drama Awards	Grand Prize (Daesang) (Note: A Daesang (Korean: 대상), which translates to "Grand Prize", is the highest honor given out at South Korean award ceremonies.)	How's Your Husband?
1987	32nd Asia Pacific Film Festival	Best Actress	Love Triangle
1987	26h Grand Bell Awards	Special Jury Award	Love Triangle
1986	31st Asia Pacific Film Festival	Best Actress	Mulberry
1986	6th Korean Association of Film Critics Awards	Best Actress	Mulberry
1984	4th Korean Association of Film Critics Awards	Best Actress	The Winter That Year Was Warm
1984	23rd Grand Bell Awards	Best Actress	The Winter That Year Was Warm
1984	21st Baeksang Arts Awards	Best Actress	The Winter That Year Was Warm
1982	MBC Drama Awards	Grand Prize (Daesang)	Jang Hui-bin
1980	17th Baeksang Arts Awards	Best New Actress	Flame Bird
1979	TBC Drama Awards	Best Newcomer	Mapo Harbor
1978	3rd Miss Lotte Pageant	Popularity Award	
