= List of South Korean submissions for the Academy Award for Best International Feature Film =

Best International Feature Film submissions from South Korea

Highlights
- Debut: 1962
- Submissions: 38
- Nominations: 1
- Oscar winners: 1

The Republic of Korea (South Korea) has submitted films to compete for the Academy Award for Best International Feature Film (Note: The category was previously named the Academy Award for Best Foreign Language Film, but this was changed to the Academy Award for Best International Feature Film in April 2019, after the Academy deemed the word "Foreign" to be outdated.) since 1962. The award is handed out annually by the United States Academy of Motion Picture Arts and Sciences to a feature-length motion picture produced outside the United States that contains primarily non-English dialogue.

As of 2026, South Korea won once for Parasite (2019), which was also the first film not in English to win the Academy Award for Best Picture.

== Submissions ==
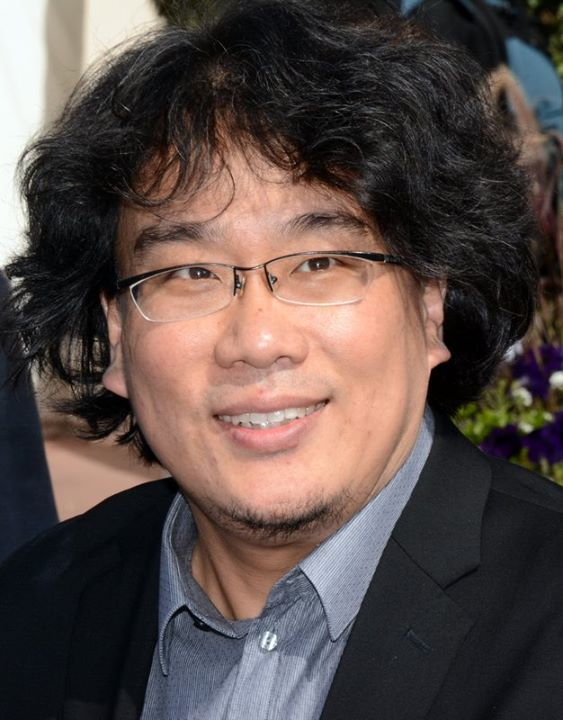
Bong Joon Ho directed South Korea's first film to be nominated for and win the award, Parasite (2019).

Every year, each country is invited by the Academy of Motion Picture Arts and Sciences to submit its best film for the Academy Award for Best International Feature Film. The International Feature Film Committee oversees the process and reviews all the submitted films. Following this, they vote via secret ballot to determine the five nominees for the award.

The Korean nominee is chosen annually by a special committee assembled by the Korean Film Council.

Shin Sang-ok and Lee Chang-dong are the most submitted filmmakers with four films selected each. Shin later became internationally famous after he was held hostage in North Korea between 1978 and 1986, and forced to make movies for Kim Jong Il. Seven other filmmakers (Lee Doo-yong, Kim Ki-duk, Kim Tae-kyun, Lee Joon-ik, Jang Hoon, Bong Joon Ho and Park Chan-wook), have had two of their films selected.

Bong Joon Ho's Parasite (2019) was the first Korean film to be nominated in the category. It won four Academy Awards, including: Best Picture, Best Director, Best Original Screenplay, and Best International Feature Film, alongside nominations for Best Film Editing and Best Production Design. As of 2026, the film remains the only non-English language Best Picture winner.

Burning (2018), Decision to Leave (2022), and No Other Choice (2025), advanced to the December shortlists, but were not nominated.

All the films submitted are primary in Korean. Below is a list of the films that have been submitted by South Korea for review by the Academy for the award since its conception.

Year (Ceremony)	Film title used in nomination	Original title	Director(s)	Result
1962 (35th)	My Mother and the Roomer	사랑방 손님과 어머니	Shin Sang-ok	Not nominated
1964 (37th)	The Dumb Samyong	벙어리 삼룡	Shin Sang-ok	Not nominated
1966 (39th)	Rice	쌀	Shin Sang-ok	Not nominated
1968 (41st)	Descendants of Cain	카인의 후예	Yu Hyun-mok	Not nominated
1969 (42nd)	The Old Craftsman of Jar	독 짓는 늙은이	Choi Ha-won	Not nominated
1973 (46th)	The Tragedy of Deaf Sam-yong	비련의 벙어리 삼룡	Byun Jang-ho	Not nominated
1984 (57th)	Mulleya Mulleya	여인잔혹사 물레야 물레야	Lee Doo-yong	Not nominated
1985 (58th)	Eoudong	어우동	Lee Jang-ho	Not nominated
1986 (59th)	Eunuch	내시	Lee Doo-yong	Not nominated
1990 (63rd)	Mayumi	마유미	Shin Sang-ok	Not nominated
1994 (67th)	Life and Death of the Hollywood Kid	헐리우드 키드의 생애	Chung Ji-young	Not nominated
1995 (68th)	301, 302	301 302	Park Chul-soo	Not nominated
2000 (73rd)	Chunhyang	춘향뎐	Im Kwon-taek	Not nominated
2002 (75th)	Oasis	오아시스	Lee Chang-dong	Not nominated
2003 (76th)	Spring, Summer, Fall, Winter... and Spring	봄, 여름, 가을, 겨울 그리고 봄	Kim Ki-duk	Not nominated
2004 (77th)	Taegukgi	태극기 휘날리며	Kang Je-gyu	Not nominated
2005 (78th)	Welcome to Dongmakgol	웰컴투 동막골	Park Kwang-hyun	Not nominated
2006 (79th)	King and the Clown	왕의 남자	Lee Joon-ik	Not nominated
2007 (80th)	Secret Sunshine	밀양	Lee Chang-dong	Not nominated
2008 (81st)	Crossing	크로싱	Kim Tae-kyun	Not nominated
2009 (82nd)	Mother	마더	Bong Joon-ho	Not nominated
2010 (83rd)	A Barefoot Dream	맨발의 꿈	Kim Tae-kyun	Not nominated
2011 (84th)	The Front Line	고지전	Jang Hoon	Not nominated
2012 (85th)	Pietà	피에타	Kim Ki-duk	Not nominated
2013 (86th)	Juvenile Offender	범죄소년	Kang Yi-kwan	Not nominated
2014 (87th)	Sea Fog	해무	Shim Sung-bo	Not nominated
2015 (88th)	The Throne	사도	Lee Joon-ik	Not nominated
2016 (89th)	The Age of Shadows	밀정	Kim Jee-woon	Not nominated
2017 (90th)	A Taxi Driver	택시운전사	Jang Hoon	Not nominated
2018 (91st)	Burning	버닝	Lee Chang-dong	Made shortlist
2019 (92nd)	Parasite	기생충	Bong Joon-ho	Won Academy Award
2020 (93rd)	The Man Standing Next	남산의 부장들	Woo Min-ho	Not nominated
2021 (94th)	Escape from Mogadishu	모가디슈	Ryoo Seung-wan	Not nominated
2022 (95th)	Decision to Leave	헤어질 결심	Park Chan-wook	Made shortlist
2023 (96th)	Concrete Utopia	콘크리트 유토피아	Um Tae-hwa	Not nominated
2024 (97th)	12.12: The Day	서울의 봄	Kim Sung-su	Not nominated
2025 (98th)	No Other Choice	어쩔수가없다	Park Chan-wook	Made shortlist
2026 (99th)	Possible Love	가능한 사랑	Lee Chang-dong	Pending

== Shortlisted Films ==
Year	Films
2005	3-Iron · Duelist · April Snow · Sympathy For Lady Vengeance · Marathon · Crying Fist · A Bittersweet Life
2014	A Girl at My Door · Han Gong-ju · A Hard Day
2017	Becoming Who I Was · The Fortress · The Mayor · Memoir of a Murderer · One Step · The Prison · A Stray Goat · V.I.P. · Vanishing Time: A Boy Who Returned · The Villainess
2019	Dark Figure of Crime · House of Hummingbird · Idol · Innocent Witness · Mal-Mo-E: The Secret Mission · A Resistance · Swing Kids
2020	Beasts Clawing at Straws · Bring Me Home · Confession · Deliver Us from Evil · Life Is Beautiful · Moving On · Night of the Undead · An Old Lady · Paper Flower · Peninsula · Samjin Company English Class · Steel Rain 2: Summit
2021	The Book of Fish · Dust-Man · I · Men Who Won't Pick Up Guns 2: Breaking a Taboo · Ten Months
2022	Broker · Contorted · Emergency Declaration · Hansan: Rising Dragon · Hommage · Yeonryeon
2023	Cobweb · The Devil's Deal · Don't Buy the Seller · Hero · The Hill of Secrets · Hopeless · The Moon · The Point Men · Ransomed · Road to Boston · Sleep · Smugglers
2024	Cabriolet · Citizen of a Kind · Escape · Exhuma · FAQ · House of the Seasons · I, the Executioner · The Land of Happiness · Noryang: Deadly Sea · Our Season · Picnic · Revolver · Victory · Yeonryeon
2025	About Family · Dark Nuns · Exorcism Chronicles: The Beginning · Harbin · Hi-Five · The Killers · Love in the Big City · Mimang · My Daughter Is a Zombie · A Normal Family · The Old Woman with the Knife · Omniscient Reader: The Prophecy · Secret: Untold Melody · Somebody · Spring Night · The Ugly · When This Summer is Over · Yadang: The Snitch
2026	Colony · Hope · Mr. Kim Goes to the Cinema · Project Y · Salmokji: Whispering Water

== See also ==
- List of Academy Award winners and nominees for Best International Feature Film
- List of Academy Award-winning foreign language films
- Cinema of Korea
- In the Absence
