= Mulberry (film) =

- Theatrical poster
- Hangul: 뽕
- RR: Ppong
- MR: Ppong
- Directed by: Lee Doo-yong
- Written by: Yoon Sam-yook
- Based on: Mulberry by Na Do-hyang
- Produced by: Lee Tae-won
- Starring: Lee Mi-sook; Lee Dae-geun; Lee Moo-jeong
- Cinematography: Son Hyun-chae
- Edited by: Lee Kyung-ja
- Music by: Choi Chang-kwon
- Production company: TaeHeung Pictures
- Release date: February 8, 1986
- Running time: 114 minutes
- Country: South Korea
- Language: Korean

Mulberry (Korean: 뽕) is a 1986 South Korean erotic drama film directed by Lee Doo-yong. Based on the eponymous classic story by Na Do-hyang, the film became known for its erotic subject matter, made possible by the government's gradual relaxation of censorship and control over the film industry during the 1980s. It was part of the wave of "Folk erotic" films that became popular in South Korea at this time.

== Plot ==
An-hyeop, a beautiful young woman, lives in a small village in Korea during the Japanese occupation. Her husband, Sam-bo, is a traveling gambler who returns home for short periods after months away. During his long absences, An-hyeop earns food, money and other goods by picking mulberry leaves (ppong in Korean) for a neighbor who raises silk-worms, and also by having sex with nearly every male in the village. Angered by An-hyeop's influence over their husbands, the village women conspire to drive her away, first by beating her, and then by convincing the village elder expel her.

When the elder visits An-hyeop's home to convince her to leave, she instead wins him over to her side by seducing him. The only man An-hyeop refuses to have sex with is Sam-dol, the village servant. Frustrated and infuriated, Sam-dol retaliates by telling An-hyeop's husband about her sexual promiscuity when he returns to the village. Sam-bo, An-hyeop's husband, reacts by beating Sam-dol for his verbal abuse of his wife. As Sam-bo again leaves to gamble, An-hyeop is again left to fend for herself, gathering mulberry leaves. The film closes with a lively, humorous ode to spring (봄 - bom) and mulberry (뽕 - ppong).

== Cast ==
- Lee Mi-sook as An-hyeop
- Lee Dae-geun as Sam-dol
- Lee Moo-jeong as Kim Sam-bo

== Background ==
Essentially a melodramic sex-farce, Lee Young-il, in his History of Korean Cinema (1988) points out that the film "depicts the agony of life under Japanese rule through sexual jests." Min, et al. write that the film symbolically shows that, with the husband gone to work with the Independence Movement, there was not much else going on in small villages during the Japanese Occupation but sex.

Mulberry was shot on location at Bossam Village, a small, traditional site in Samdong, Ulsan, which was also used in director Im Kwon-taek's Surrogate Womb (씨받이 - Ssibaji) (1986), a film which helped to bring international attention to the South Korean cinema. The Korean cinematic "tough guy" of the era, Lee Dae-geun played the role of the servant, Sam-dol, who is the one man in the village with whom An-hyeop will not have sex. Lee became a sex symbol through his role in the film, which caused the actor some consternation. He states that he took part in the film for its literary qualities. Because the erotic elements of the film upstaged the literary aspects in the public eye, he refused to appear in the first sequel, Mulberry 2 (뽕 2 - Ppong 2, 1988).

== Availability ==
Mulberry was released on Region 3 DVD in South Korea in 2005 with English subtitles. As of December 2007, it is currently still in print.

== Awards ==
- Best Film, Best Actress (Lee Mi-sook), Best Actor (Lee Dae-keun) at 6th Korean Film Critics Association (Yongpyong) Awards
- Best Director at 22nd Korea Drama and Film Art Awards
- Best Adaptation at 24th Dae Jong Awards
- Best Actress (Lee Mi-sook) at 31st Asian Pacific Film Festival
- Presented at 10th Montreal World Film Festival

== Later films ==
A sequel titled Mulberry 2 was released in 1988, followed by Mulberry 3 in 1992.

In 2014, a contemporary adaptation titled Mulberry 2014 and featuring different characters in a similar setting was released. The film was directed by Kong Ja-kwan and starred Kim Yeon-soo.
