= Deaf Sam-yong (1964 film) =

- Theatrical poster for Deaf Sam-yong (1964)
- Hangul: 벙어리 삼룡
- Hanja: 벙어리 三龍
- RR: Beongeori samnyong
- MR: Pŏngŏri samnyong
- Directed by: Shin Sang-ok
- Written by: Kim Kang-yoon
- Based on: Beongeori Samryong by Na Do-hyang
- Produced by: Shin Sang-ok
- Starring: Kim Jin-kyu; Choi Eun-hee
- Cinematography: Kim Jong-rae
- Edited by: Oh Seong-hwan
- Music by: Jeong Yoon-joo
- Production company: Shin Films
- Release date: November 13, 1964
- Running time: 86 minutes
- Country: South Korea
- Language: Korean
- Box office: $10,253

Deaf Sam-yong (Korean: 벙어리 삼룡) is a 1964 South Korean drama film directed, produced by Shin Sang-ok, based on the 1925 short story of the same title by Na Do-hyang. It was chosen as Best Film at the Grand Bell Awards. The film was also selected as the South Korean entry for the Best Foreign Language Film at the 37th Academy Awards, but was not accepted as a nominee.

It was previously filmed as Beongeoli Sam-ryong in 1929 by Na Woon-gyu.

== Plot ==
A deaf farmhand is in love with the landlord's daughter-in-law.

== Cast ==
- Kim Jin-kyu
- Choi Eun-hee
- Park No-sik
- Do Kum-bong
- Choi Nam-hyun
- Han Eun-jin
- Choe Seong-ho
- Seo Wol-yeong
- Park Jin-hyeon
- Jeong Deuk-sun

== See also ==
- List of submissions to the 37th Academy Awards for Best Foreign Language Film
- List of South Korean submissions for the Academy Award for Best Foreign Language Film
