= Won Mi-kyung =

South Korean actress (born 1960)

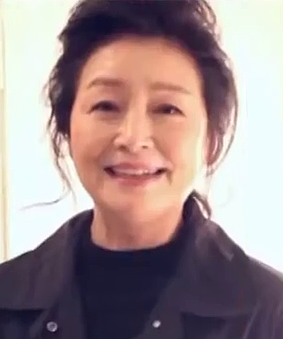
- Won in 2017
- Born: April 24, 1960 (age 66); Chuncheon, Gangwon, South Korea
- Occupation: Actress
- Years active: 1978–present
- Spouse: Lee Chang-soon (m. 1987)
- Children: 3

Korean name
- Hangul: 원미경
- Hanja: 元美京
- RR: Won Migyeong
- MR: Wŏn Migyŏng

Won Mi-kyung (Korean: 원미경; born April 24, 1960) is a South Korean actress. Won was born in Chuncheon, Gangwon, South Korea. She graduated from Seoul Girls' High School. Won is referred to as one of "The Troika of the 1980s" along with Lee Mi-sook, and Lee Bo-hee, all of whom dominated the screen of the period. Won's glamorous body attracted male audiences. After Won Mi-kyung won the Miss Lotte title in 1978, she started her acting career as a TV actress of TBC.

== Filmography ==
*Note; the whole list is referenced.

| Year | Title | Role |
|---|---|---|
| 1979 | You Are My Destiny | |
| 1979 | The Third Han-gang Bridge | |
| 1979 | The Trappings of Youth | |
| 1979 | Admiration of Nights | |
| 1980 | The Long Winter of the Idiots | |
| 1980 | Wild Woman | |
| 1980 | Colorful Woman | |
| 1980 | Outsiders | |
| 1981 | The Invited Ones | |
| 1981 | Subzero Point '81 | |
| 1981 | Brother Kim Du-han and Brother Sirasoni | |
| 1981 | Geniuses With the Grade F | |
| 1981 | Dear Friend, Please Leave Quietly | |
| 1982 | Applause | |
| 1982 | Iron Men | |
| 1982 | The Blues of Jong-ro | |
| 1982 | The Sesame Salt and the Ugly | |
| 1982 | Slave of Love | |
| 1982 | Rebellion | |
| 1982 | Dancing Snail | |
| 1983 | The Woman Without a Name | |
| 1983 | You are a Bad Person | |
| 1983 | Not Looks But The Heart | |
| 1983 | Human Market, Small Devil - An Autobiography of a Twenty-two-year-old | |
| 1983 | Spinning the Tales of Cruelty Towards Women | Gillye |
| 1983 | Theater of Life (인생극장) | |
| 1983 | My Pounding Heart | |
| 1983 | Kalmae-gi's Burning Passion | |
| 1984 | North and South | |
| 1984 | Divorce Court | |
| 1984 | A Bird Flying At Dawn | |
| 1984 | The Miss and the Cadet | |
| 1984 | Hanging Tree | |
| 1984 | Day and Night | |
| 1985 | Cabbage in a Pepper Field | |
| 1985 | Miss Kim | |
| 1985 | Human Market 2, Burning Desire | |
| 1986 | Byun Kang-swoi | |
| 1987 | Slaves | |
| 1987 | Byun Gang-soi Sequel | |
| 1988 | Chairman, Our Chairman | |
| 1989 | Happy Woman | Lee Soon-im |
| 1990 | Shinsa-dong Gigolo | |
| 1990 | Only Because You Are a Woman | |
| 1993 | Wild Chrysanthemum | Eun-seon |
| 1993 | Hwa-Om-Kyung | Lady of lotus |
| 1998 | Eunsil | Im Cheong-ok |
| 2000 | Ajumma | Oh Sam-sook |
| 2016 | Happy Home | Bae Sook-nyeo |
| 2017 | Whisper | Ahn Myung-sun |
| 2017 | The Most Beautiful Goodbye | Kim In-hee |
| 2020 | My Unfamiliar Family | Lee Jin-sook |
| 2024 | Wonderful World | Oh Go-eun |
| 2025 | Our Unwritten Seoul | Kim Ro-sa (fake)/ Hyeon Sang-wol |

== Awards and nominations ==
Name of the award ceremony, year presented, category, nominee of the award, and the result of the nomination
| Award ceremony | Year | Category | Nominee / Work | Result | Ref. |
|---|---|---|---|---|---|
| Baeksang Arts Awards | 1980 | Best New Actress –Film | You Are My Destiny | Won | |
| Baeksang Arts Awards | 1984 | Best Actress – Film | Mulleya Mulleya | Won | |
| Baeksang Arts Awards | 2001 | Best Actress – Television | Ajumma | Won | |
| Baeksang Arts Awards | 2026 | Best Supporting Actress – Television | Our Unwritten Seoul | Nominated | |
| Blue Dragon Film Awards | 1990 | Best Leading Actress | Only Because You Are a Woman | Won | |
| Grand Bell Awards | 1979 | Best New Actress | The Trappings of Youth | Won | |
| Grand Bell Awards | 1991 | Best Actress | Only Because You Are a Woman | Won | |
| Grand Bell Awards | 1994 | Best Supporting Actress | The Avatamska Sutra | Nominated | |
| Korean Association of Film Critics Awards | 1984 | Best Actress | Mulleya Mulleya | Won | |
| MBC Drama Awards | 1984 | Grand Prize (Daesang) | Love and Truth | Won | |
| MBC Drama Awards | 1989 | Grand Prize (Daesang) | A Happy Woman | Won | |
| MBC Drama Awards | 2000 | Top Excellence Award, Actress | Ajumma | Won | |
