= Actresses (film) =

2009 South Korean mockumentary-style drama film

- Theatrical release poster
- Hangul: 여배우들
- Hanja: 女排優들
- RR: Yeobaeudeul
- MR: Yŏbaeudŭl
- Directed by: E J-yong
- Written by: E J-yong; Youn Yuh-jung; Lee Mi-sook; Go Hyun-jung; Choi Ji-woo; Kim Min-hee; Kim Ok-vin
- Produced by: Seo Dong-hyeon; E J-yong
- Starring: Youn Yuh-jung; Lee Mi-sook; Go Hyun-jung; Choi Ji-woo; Kim Min-hee; Kim Ok-vin
- Cinematography: Hong Kyung-pyo
- Edited by: Hahm Sung-won; Go Ah-mo
- Music by: Jang Young-gyu; Lee Byung-hoon
- Production companies: Moongcle Pictures; Sponge Entertainment
- Distributed by: Showbox
- Release date: 10 December 2009 (South Korea)
- Running time: 104 minutes
- Country: South Korea
- Language: Korean
- Box office: US$3.4 million

Actresses (Korean: 여배우들; RR: Yeobaeudeul) is a 2009 South Korean mockumentary-style drama film directed by E J-yong.

== Plot ==
Six actresses—Youn Yuh-jung, Lee Mi-sook, Go Hyun-jung, Choi Ji-woo, Kim Min-hee and Kim Ok-vin, each portraying themselves—come together for a Vogue Korea magazine photo shoot at a studio in Cheongdam-dong, Seoul on Christmas Eve, resulting in a clash of egos between individuals not used to sharing the limelight.

== Production ==
Director E J-yong was first inspired to make the film after going out for a drink with actresses Youn Yuh-jung and Go Hyun-jung—both his close friends—and later recalled, "I wanted to create something unconventional. I wanted to show the public how charming actresses are in real life." Yoon and Go were cast in the film alongside Lee Mi-sook, Choi Ji-woo, Kim Min-hee and Kim Ok-vin, each of them agreeing to take part without a guarantee.

Actresses was made without a script, instead being filmed on a scene-by-scene basis with the actresses improvising their performances according to the given situation. E noted: "I provided the basis for conflict and the actresses took it from there. The six women represent Korean actresses as a whole, and instead of creating something fictional I thought it would be interesting to feature each actress' charms and show something real." The film includes a real-life confrontation between Go and Choi, with each admitting that their on-set relationship was strained, and Go saying that she felt envious of Choi's looks.

== Release ==
Actresses was released in South Korea on December 10, 2009. The film pulled in 508,243 admissions.
