= Golden Goblet Award for Best Director =

Chinese film award

The Golden Goblet Award for Best Director (Chinese: 金爵奖最佳导演) is a prize given in the main category of competition at the Shanghai International Film Festival.

== Award winners ==
Year	Film	Director
1993	Sopyonje	Kwon-taek Im
1995	Min fynske barndom	Erik Clausen
1997	The Woodlanders	Phil Agland
1999	Gakko III	Yōji Yamada
2001	Antitrust	Peter Howitt
2002	Mullet	David Caesar
2003	no award this year	
2004	Untold Scandal	E J-yong
2005	Young Andersen	Rumle Hammerich
2006	Sauf le respect que je vous dois	Fabienne Godet
2007	The Go Master	Zhuangzhuang Tian
2008	Loss	Māris Martinsons
2009	Normal: The Düsseldorf Ripper	Julius Ševčík
2010	Deep in the Clouds	Liu Jie
2011	Mr. Tree	Han Jie
2012	Beijing Blues	Gao Qunshu
2013	The Major	Yuri Bykov
2014	Mikra Anglia	Pantelis Voulgaris
2015	The Dead End	Cao Baoping
2016	Flowers of Evil	Antti Jokinen
2017	I'm a Killer	Maciej Pieprzyca
2018	A Translator	Rodrigo Barriuso/Sebastián Barriuso
2019	Castle of Dream	Reza Mirkarimi
2021	The Contrary Route	Abolfazl Jalili
2023	All Ears	Liu Jiayin
2024	Snowflakes in My Yard	Bakur Bakurazde
