= Obsessed (2014 film) =

- Theatrical release poster
- Hangul: 인간중독
- Hanja: 人間中毒
- RR: Inganjungdok
- MR: In'ganjungdok
- Directed by: Kim Dae-woo
- Written by: Kim Dae-woo; Oh Tae-kyung
- Produced by: Park Dae-hee; Kim Dae-woo
- Starring: Song Seung-heon; Lim Ji-yeon; Cho Yeo-jeong; On Joo-wan
- Cinematography: Byun Bong-seon
- Edited by: Kim Sang-bum; Kim Jae-bum
- Music by: Lee Jae-jin
- Production company: Iron Package
- Distributed by: Next Entertainment World
- Release date: May 14, 2014 (South Korea)
- Running time: 132 minutes
- Country: South Korea
- Language: Korean
- Box office: US$10.7 million

Obsessed (Korean: 인간중독; RR: Inganjungdok; lit. 'Human Addiction') is a 2014 South Korean erotic romance film written and directed by Kim Dae-woo, about a couple having a passionate affair in a military camp under tight surveillance in 1969.

== Plot ==
War hero Colonel Kim Jin-pyong is on the verge of his promotion to General. Both his Commander father-in-law and his wife are envious of this, but his affection for his wife subsided long ago, and due to post-traumatic disorder from the Vietnam War, he suffers mental breakdowns and nightmares of the fallen soldiers under his command.

One day, Captain Kyung Woo-jin is transferred to Jin-pyong's troop and he moves in next door with his wife Ga-heun. Jin-pyong encounters Ga-heun and instantly falls in love with her. He has never felt this emotion in his life and is confused by it. He is later invited to an event at an army hospital organized by the wives of commissioned officers, where they volunteer. A patient suffering from PTSD attacks Ga-heun, and Jin-pyong jumps in to help her. He saves her from the patient, but she gets shot in the process and is admitted to the hospital. She begins to develop cordial feelings for Jin-pyong for risking his own life to save her from the vicious attack.

Jin-pyong and Ga-heun meet in complete secrecy and share their own memories. Over time, their love for one another blossoms to maturity. As the two enjoy their secret love affair, Ga-heun receives a call that her mother is ill and immediately goes to the hospital and there they are met by Ga-heun's mother-in-law. Her mother-in-law raised Ga-heun when she lost her family as if she was one of her own children, and Ga-heun's guilt leads her to end her affair with Jin-pyong. He has no choice but to go along with her decision.

Jin-pyong has a hard time getting over her, and he schemes to falsely accuse Woo-jin for something he did not do, but the scheme does not work. It is a living hell to see Ga-heun giving him the cold shoulder, adding to the fact that she is so close by, being in the same base, and living next door to her.

Jin-pyong is finally promoted to general, and a celebration party is held. Ga-heun and Woo-jin also attend the party. Jin-pyong is surrounded by people congratulating him, but he can only scan the room for a glimpse of Ga-heun. It is also revealed that Jin-pyong's wife is pregnant. He gets drunk by the end of the night, and not being able to contain his feelings any longer, he shouts why she had to leave him, completely exposing their secret affair to the entire army.

In a fit of rage for insulting his daughter, his father-in-law decides to send Jin-pyong back to Vietnam. Jin-pyong pleads Ga-heun that he's willing to give up his army career for her. But she says she's not so in love with him that she's willing to give up her life. He is devastated by her response and attempts to commit suicide. He even fails that and leaves the base for Vietnam.

Two years later, while attending an official party, a group of Special Unit men from Vietnam approach Ga-heun. They tell her that Jin-pyong died on the battlefield while guiding them, and give her something. In his dying moment, he reached out for a polaroid photograph of Ga-heun and himself. Even though the affair was short, the polaroid captured a happy moment of the two ballroom dancing. On the back, a short phrase is written on it – "My Love". Ga heun cries in grief while Jin-pyoung is seen taken dead in a helicopter.

== Cast ==
- Song Seung-heon as Colonel Kim Jin-pyeong
- Lim Ji-yeon as Jong Ga-heun
- Jo Yeo-jeong as Lee Sook-jin, Jin-pyeong's wife
- On Joo-wan as Kyung Woo-jin, Ga-heun's husband
- Yoo Hae-jin as Im, the Renaissance Music Hall owner
- Park Hyuk-kwon as Colonel Choi, Jin-pyeong's office aide
- Jeon Hye-jin as Choi's wife
- Bae Seong-woo as Jo Hak-soo
- Uhm Tae-goo as Warrant officer Kim
- Ye Soo-jung as Woo-jin's mother
- Yoon Da-kyung as Ga-heun's mother
- Oh Hee-joon as Soldier on duty
- Jung Sang-chul as Chief of staff
- Jung Won-joong as Brigadier general
- Yeon Je-wook as Hospital patient
- Lee Seung-joon as Chief medical officer

== Marketing ==
When the film studio uploaded racy teaser photos from the movie on April 24, 2014, more than 4.7 million people logged onto the official website. Industry insiders noted that the interest in the film was remarkable, because the marketing team wasn't able to conduct any promotional activity due to the recent sinking of the MV Sewol incident. The hype was mostly attributed to actor Song Seung-heon, since Obsessed was his first R-rated romance film.

== Release ==
Obsessed was released on May 14, 2014. It debuted at No. 1 in the local box office, drawing 445,490 admissions and making ₩3.7 billion (US$3.6 million) on its first week.

== Music ==
The first teaser used "La Danse" by Stefano Barzan and "A Table for Two" by Didier Goret. The second teaser used "Regal Portrait" by Philip Sheppard. The trailer used "Les Abers" by Christophe Delabre and "Regal Portrait" by Philip Sheppard.

The music featured in the tennis match and car sex scene is the second movement of Alessandro Marcello's Concerto in D minor with piano performance by Moon Jin-tak and nylon guitar performance by Hwang Min-woong. "The Rose" in the closing credits is performed by Japanese singer Aoi Teshima.

== Awards and nominations ==
Year	Award	Category	Recipient	Result
2014	23rd Buil Film Awards	Best Supporting Actress	Jo Yeo-jeong	Nominated
2014	23rd Buil Film Awards	Best New Actress	Lim Ji-yeon	Won
2014	34th Korean Association of Film Critics Awards	Best Supporting Actress	Jo Yeo-jeong	Won
2014	34th Korean Association of Film Critics Awards	Best New Actress	Lim Ji-yeon	Won
2014	51st Grand Bell Awards	Best Supporting Actress	Jo Yeo-jeong	Nominated
2014	51st Grand Bell Awards	Best New Actress	Lim Ji-yeon	Won
2014	51st Grand Bell Awards	Best Costume Design	Kwak Jeong-ae	Nominated
2014	35th Blue Dragon Film Awards	Best Supporting Actress	Jo Yeo-jeong	Nominated
2014	35th Blue Dragon Film Awards	Best New Actress	Lim Ji-yeon	Nominated
2014	35th Blue Dragon Film Awards	Best Art Direction	Kim Ji-soo	Nominated
2014	35th Blue Dragon Film Awards	Popular Star Award	Song Seung-heon	Won
2015	6th KOFRA Film Awards	Best Supporting Actress	Jo Yeo-jeong	Won
2015	10th Max Movie Awards	Best New Actress	Lim Ji-yeon	Nominated
2015	51st Baeksang Arts Awards	Best Supporting Actress	Jo Yeo-jeong	Nominated
2015	51st Baeksang Arts Awards	Best New Actress	Lim Ji-yeon	Nominated
