= Eunuch (film) =

1986 film

- Film poster
- Hangul: 내시
- Hanja: 內侍
- RR: Naesi
- MR: Naesi
- Directed by: Lee Doo-yong
- Written by: Kwak Il-lo
- Produced by: Lee Doo-yong
- Starring: Ahn Sung-ki; Lee Mi-sook; Namkoong Won
- Cinematography: Son Hyeon-chae
- Edited by: Ree Kyoung-ja
- Music by: Jeong Yun-ju
- Production company: Doo Sung Cinema
- Release date: 18 September 1986
- Running time: 108 minutes
- Country: South Korea
- Language: Korean

Eunuch (Korean: 내시) is a 1986 South Korean drama film directed by Lee Doo-yong. The film was selected as the South Korean entry for the Best Foreign Language Film at the 59th Academy Awards, but was not accepted as a nominee.

== Cast ==
- Ahn Sung-ki
- Lee Mi-sook
- Namkoong Won
- Kim Jin-a
- Kil Yong-woo
- Do Kum-bong

== See also ==
- List of submissions to the 59th Academy Awards for Best Foreign Language Film
- List of South Korean submissions for the Academy Award for Best Foreign Language Film
