= Yoon Sam-yook =

South Korean film director (1937–2020)

- Born: 25 May 1937; South Korea
- Died: 2 July 2020 (aged 83)
- Occupations: Film director, screenwriter

Korean name
- Hangul: 윤삼육
- Hanja: 尹三六
- RR: Yun Samyuk
- MR: Yun Samyuk

Yoon Sam-yook (May 25, 1937 – July 2, 2020) was a South Korean film director and screenwriter. Yoon won Best Screenplay at the 1981, 1985 and 1994 Korean Association of Film Critics Awards for films, The Hut (1981), The King's Poison (1984) and I Will Survive (1993).

In 2016, he was awarded Lifetime Achievement Award at the 53rd Grand Bell Awards.

Yoon Sam-yook died on 2 July 2020, aged 83.

== Selected filmography ==
=== As director ===
- The Sparrow and the Scarecrow (1983)
- Does the American Moon Rise Over Itaewon? (1991)
- I Will Survive (1993)
- Piracy (1999)

=== As screenwriter ===
- Me, Myself and I (1973)
- The Executioner (1975)
- Flame (1975)
- Yalkae, a Joker in High School (1977)
- The Last Witness (1980)
- The Hut (1981)
- Suddenly at Midnight (1981)
- The Sparrow and the Scarecrow (1983)
- The King's Poison (1984)
- The Fool (1985)
- Mulberry (1986)
- Watcha Want? (1986)
- Milky Way in Blue Sky (1986)
- Those With Wings (1986)
- Closer, Further Closer (1986)
- The Fool 2 (1986)
- Slaves (1987)
- Adada (1987)
- Prince Yeonsan (1987)
- Gorgeous Transformation (1987)
- The Heat of the Green Season (1987)
- The Secret Diary (1987)
- Miri, Mari, Wuri, Duri (1988)
- Reality (1988)
- Karma (1988)
- The Wolf's Curiosity Stole Pigeons (1989)
- Mulberry 2 (1989)
- Korean Connection (1990)
- General's Son (1990)
- Does the American Moon Rise Over Itaewon? (1991)
- The Emperor of Romance (1992)
- I Will Survive (1993)
- Thief and a Poet (1995)
- Piracy (1999)

== Awards ==
- 1973 10th Blue Dragon Film Awards: Best Screenplay (Me, Myself and I)
- 1981 2nd Korean Association of Film Critics Awards: Best Screenplay (The Hut)
- 1985 5th Korean Association of Film Critics Awards: Best Screenplay (The King's Poison)
- 1994 14th Korean Association of Film Critics Awards: Best Screenplay (I Will Survive)
- 2016 53rd Grand Bell Awards: Lifetime Achievement Award
