= Mulleya Mulleya =

- Theatrical poster for Mulleya Mulleya (1984)
- Hangul: 여인 잔혹사 물레야 물레야
- Hanja: 女人 殘酷史 물레야 물레야
- RR: Yeoin janhoksa mulleya mulleya
- MR: Yŏin chanhoksa mulleya mulleya
- Directed by: Lee Doo-yong
- Written by: Im Choong
- Produced by: Jeong Woong-ki
- Starring: Won Mi-kyung; Shin Il-ryong
- Cinematography: Lee Seong-choon
- Edited by: Lee Kyung-ja
- Music by: Jeong Yoon-joo
- Production companies: HanRim Films Co., Ltd.
- Release date: February 25, 1984
- Running time: 100 minutes
- Country: South Korea
- Language: Korean

Mulleya Mulleya (Korean: 여인 잔혹사 물레야 물레야; also known as Spinning the Tales of Cruelty Towards Women), is a 1984 South Korean film directed by Lee Doo-yong. It was chosen as Best Film at the Grand Bell Awards. It was screened in the Un Certain Regard section of the 1984 Cannes Film Festival. The film was also selected as the South Korean entry for the Best Foreign Language Film at the 57th Academy Awards, but was not accepted as a nominee.

== Plot ==
A historical drama about the life of a widow. 15th century life was sometimes cruel to Korean women and this story depicts a lot of the injustices that could occur as happening to Kil-Rye, the heroine.

== Cast ==
- Won Mi-kyung: Gillye
- Shin Il-ryong: Yun-bo
- Moon Jung-suk: Mother
- Choe Sung-kwan: Father
- Park Min-ho
- Choe Seong-ho
- Moon Mi-bong
- Yang Chun
- Hyun Kill-soo
- Choe Jeong-won

== Critical reception ==
Comment on contemporary reactions to this film: There was a great deal of controversy in the Korean media when this film came out, saying that this work did not represent Korea well. Some objected to the shade of the lead actress' skin, saying that she looked too dark for a Korean. Whiteness of skin was and is still considered important among many in Korea.

Others scoffed that it was unlikely that all of the injustices depicted could have happened to one woman. However, it is a vivid and visually spectacular depiction of the struggles many women went through in that time period.

The film also polarized audiences and stirred controversy when it was shown at the East–West Center and the Fifth International Film Festival in Honolulu.

== See also ==
- List of submissions to the 57th Academy Awards for Best Foreign Language Film
- List of South Korean submissions for the Academy Award for Best Foreign Language Film

Preceded by Come Unto Down	Grand Bell Awards for Best Film; 1983	Succeeded by Adultery Tree
