= The Big Swindle =

- Theatrical release poster
- Hangul: 범죄의 재구성
- Hanja: 犯罪의 再構成
- RR: Beomjoeui jaeguseong
- MR: Pŏmjoeŭi chaegusŏng
- Directed by: Choi Dong-hoon
- Written by: Choi Dong-hoon
- Produced by: Lee Seok-won
- Starring: Park Shin-yang; Yum Jung-ah; Baek Yoon-sik
- Cinematography: Choi Young-hwan
- Edited by: Shin Min-kyung
- Music by: Han Jae-kwon
- Distributed by: Showbox
- Release date: April 16, 2004
- Running time: 116 minutes
- Country: South Korea
- Language: Korean
- Budget: US$3.5 million

The Big Swindle (Korean: 범죄의 재구성) is a 2004 South Korean heist film written and directed by Choi Dong-hoon. It was Choi's feature film directorial debut. It follows a group of four con men, one con woman, and one forger in a complex set of plots and counterplots against individual marks, against the Bank of Korea, against the police, and against each other.

== Plot ==
Choi Chang-hyeok is driving in his car, when he suddenly finds himself followed by the cops. In the following chase he tries to escape, but as his car emerges from a tunnel it goes over the side, down a cliff and is killed in the burning wreck. The reason he tried to escape, is that he had just left the Bank of Korea, where he was part of a scam, that got him and his four accomplices the neat sum of US$5 billion won. One of his accomplices was caught, and the other three disappeared – and so did all the money.

Eol-mae was the one caught by the cops, and they try to get him to talk and reveal the scam and his accomplices. In flashbacks we see how the plan was hatched, and get to know the suspects. The cops tries to find out more about the killed Chang-hyeok, and find his brother, who is the owner of a used book store. He has been at odds with his deceased brother, but now gets a big life insurance. This interests Seo In-kyeong. She has been living with Mr. Kim, who is a veteran con artist and the mastermind in the scam. In-kyeong learns about Chang-hyeok and now wants to get to know about his brother.

== Awards and nominations ==
2004 Busan Film Critics Awards

- Best Supporting Actor – Baek Yoon-sik
- Best New Director – Choi Dong-hoon

2004 Grand Bell Awards

- Best Original Screenplay – Choi Dong-hoon
- Best New Director – Choi Dong-hoon
- Nomination – Best Actor – Park Shin-yang
- Nomination – Best Supporting Actor – Chun Ho-jin
- Nomination – Best Supporting Actor – Lee Moon-sik
- Nomination – Best Editing – Shin Min-kyung

2004 Blue Dragon Film Awards

- Best Supporting Actress – Yum Jung-ah
- Best Screenplay – Choi Dong-hoon
- Best New Director – Choi Dong-hoon
- Nomination – Best Film
- Nomination – Best Actor – Park Shin-yang
- Nomination – Best Supporting Actor – Baek Yoon-sik
- Nomination – Best Cinematography – Choi Young-hwan
- Nomination – Best Art Direction – Lee Min-bok
- Nomination – Best Visual Effects – Kim Tae-hun

2004 Korean Film Awards

- Best Supporting Actor – Baek Yoon-sik
- Best Screenplay – Choi Dong-hoon
- Best New Director – Choi Dong-hoon
- Best Editing – Shin Min-kyung
- Nomination – Best Actor – Park Shin-yang
- Nomination – Best Art Direction – Lee Min-bok

2004 Director's Cut Awards

- Best New Director – Choi Dong-hoon
