= Kim Seong-jong =

South Korean author (born 1941)

Kim Seong Jong, also romanized as Kim Sung Jong (Korean: 김성종; born December 31, 1941) is a South Korean novelist. He made his literary debut in 1969 when his short story "Policeman" won The Chosun Daily's New Year's Literary Contest, and in 1970, upon recommendation from established writers, he published his work in Hyundae Munhak, a highly regarded contemporary literary journal in Korea. In 1974, when The Last Witness won The Hankook Ilbo's 20th anniversary long fiction contest, he gave up his life as a newspaper and magazine reporter and began his career as a full-time professional writer.

== Biography ==
He was born on December 31, 1941 in Jinan, Shandong, Republic of China. After the liberation of Korea in 1945, he returned to Korea and settled in Pil-dong, Jung District, Seoul. However, when the Korean War broke out in 1950 while he was in the third year of elementary school at Seoul Ilshin Elementary School, he had to live as a refugee.

After graduating from Yonsei University, he worked as an English reporter for the student magazine 'Jinhak' and as a reporter for 'Yeowon', 'Yeosung Joongangl', and 'Dokseo Shinmun', and also worked for the monthly magazine 'Chang-jo' published by Cardinal Kim Soo-hwan. Then, in 1969, his short story "Policeman" won The Chosun Daily's New Year's Literary Contest, in 1971 he was recommended by the contemporary literary journal in Korea, "Hyundae Moonhak", and in 1974, his mystery novel "The Last Witness" won The Hankook Ilbo's 20th anniversary long novel contest, marking his full-fledged path as a writer.

In particular, Eyes of Dawn, serialized in The Daily Sports from 1975 to 1981, became a bestseller, selling millions of copies, and was dramatized into 36 episodes by MBC TV Director Kim Jong-hak in 1990. The drama achieved a peak viewership rating of 58.4% per episode and an average viewership rating of 44.3%.

As Eyes of Dawn gained popularity, he began serializing The Fifth Column in the same newspaper in 1977, and it was also dramatized in 1989 by MBC's Director Kim Jong-hak. Kim Seong Jong's other dramatized works include:

- The Last Witness: in 1979 (MBC, '6.25 Special'), in 1987 (MBC Dreama, 10 episodes), in 1980 (film, directed by Lee Doo-yong), in 2001 'The Last Witness'(film, directed by Bae Chang-ho, starring Lee Jung-jae, also well-known for his role as Seong Gi-hun in Squid Game)
- White Man: in 1983 (MBC, 'Bestseller Theater')f
- Seven Roses: in 1984 (MBC, directed by Kim Jong-hak, 'Bestseller Theater')
- Piano Murder: in 1987 (MBC, 'Bestseller Theater')
- Beautiful Secret Love Affair: in 1987 (MBC miniseries, 4 episodes)
- The 5th Column: in 1989 (MBC miniseries, 8 episodes)
- The Fifth Man: in 1991 (film, directed by Nam Sang-jin)
- Murder in International Express: in 1993 as 'White Maze' (KBS Miniseries, 16 episodes)

After leaving Seoul in 1981 and settling in Busan, he began to write actively and has published over 80 compilations and 100 volumes of mystery novels to date, carrying on the lineage of Korean mystery novels that began with Kim Rae-seong before the Liberation from Japan

In March 1992, he used his own money to build a library specializing in mystery literature, the Library of Mystery Literature, at Dalmaji Hill in Haeundae, Busan. The Library of Mystery Literature was registered as the first private library specializing in mystery literature in the Republic of Korea. It has a collection of about 47,000 books, including domestic and international mystery novels as well as general books, and operates novel writing classes, reading discussions, and literature lectures for the general public and aspiring writers. In 1994, he received the Bongseng Cultural Award in recognition of his contribution to the development of local culture.

== Education ==
- Yonsei University, Department of Political Science and International Studies

== Awards ==
- Korean Mystery Literature Award (1986)
- Bongsaeng Cultural Award (1994)
- Busan City Cultural Award in the Literature Category (2004)
