= The Last Witness (1980 film) =

- Film poster
- Hangul: 최후의 증인
- Hanja: 最後의 證人
- RR: Choehuui jeungin
- MR: Ch'oehuŭi chŭngin
- Directed by: Lee Doo-yong
- Written by: Yoon Sam-yook
- Based on: The Last Witness by Kim Seong-jong
- Produced by: Kim Hwa-sik
- Starring: Hah Myung-joong; Jeong Yun-hui; Choi Bool-am
- Cinematography: Jeong Il-seong
- Edited by: Lee Kyung-ja
- Music by: Kim Hee-kap
- Production company: SeKyung Enterprises Inc.
- Release date: November 15, 1980
- Running time: 158 minutes
- Country: South Korea
- Language: Korean

The Last Witness (Korean: 최후의 증인; RR: Choehuui jeungin) is a 1980 South Korean mystery film directed by Lee Doo-yong, based on the 1974 novel of the same title by Kim Seong-jong. A remake with the same title was released in 2001.

== Plot ==
Detective Oh Byung-ho is assigned to investigate the murder of a brewer in Munchang. He learns that the brewer, Yang Dal-soo, helped capture four guerrillas and kill nine during the Korean War. Kang Man-ho, one of the guerrillas that surrendered, recalls that he was entrusted by Son, his eccentric commander at Jirisan, with the safety of his daughter, Son Ji-hye, as well as a map showing the location of a fortune inherited from Son's landlord family. The commander was removed from his post and executed for refusing an order from Pyongyang for an all-out attack from the mountains; all but thirteen people were wiped out in a following attack: ten guerillas including Man-ho, as well as Ji-hye, Hwang Bau, and Han Dong-ju. Hiding out in the basement of a school, Bau and Man-ho tried to prevent the others from sexually abusing Ji-hye and conspired to surrender to the enemy with the help of Yang, an old colleague of Man-ho. The guerrillas fired on the militia that surrounded the school, which set fire to the building and killed the escaping guerrillas. Ji-hye and Bau survived and were interrogated, while Man-ho served a two-year sentence and went on to live in isolation. Byung-ho accuses Man-ho of being the father to Ji-hye's child and allowing her to be raped to hide that fact, which causes Man-ho to die in a fit of shock.

Byung-ho wants to be taken off the case but is encouraged by his superior to continue, and is sent to Seoul to track down Ji-hye. Ji-hye recalls giving birth to her baby, named Taeyoung, and living happily with Bau. However, when they wanted to find out the fortune on the map left to them by Man-ho, they had seek assistance from Yang to access Jirisan. They find the fortune but Bau is arrested for the murder of Dong-ju, who died after Bau attacked him during the surrender. Ji-hye again seeks assistance from Yang, who leads her into the bedroom of Bau's prosecutor. When Bau is sent to prison regardless, Yang feigns shock, and Ji-hye, with nowhere to go, lives with Yang until his death, having a daughter with him and leaving Taeyoung with Bau's family. Believing the Ji-hye could not be the suspect, Byung-ho returns to Munchang, where an elder tells him that his son Yongjae had seen Dong-ju alive. He tracks down Dong-ju's brother Bong-ju, who insists that Dong-ju is dead. Byung-ho beats Bong-ju until he promises to gather men to dig up Dong-ju's grave, but they assault Byung-ho, who shoots Bong-ju dead. Compromised, Dong-ju has Yongjae killed.

Finding that Kim Jungyeop, who was murdered before Yang, was Bau's prosecutor, Byung-ho tracks down the family of Bau, who was released on parole for good behavior. Bau's sister and nephew raised Taeyoung. When Bau finally returned, Taeyoung became distant and inconsolable and then disappeared, and Bau left for Seoul to find him. Certain that Taeyoung is the murderer, Byung-ho finds that Ji-hye and Bau reunited and placed Taeyoung in a mental hospital for his instability and to protect him from prosecution. Eom, a friend of Byung-ho, publishes the news that Dong-ju alive and Bau is innocent, which is confirmed when Yongjae is found in Dong-ju's burial mound. Taeyoung is abducted from the mental hospital, but Eom tails an acquaintance of Dong-ju, and, joined by Byung-ho, rescues Taeyoung and arrests Dong-ju, who had been living off hush money from Yang and Kim and finally orchestrated their deaths through Taeyoung. However, Bau has left his home to commit suicide in an attempt to prove Taeyoung's innocence. Byung-ho postpones his detainment for the killing of Bong-ju, but cannot save Bau. At Bau's funeral, Ji-hye commits suicide while the mourners are asleep. Byung-ho scatters both their ashes in the river in front of his acquaintances and police. Despite their encouragement, he walks out onto the riverbank and commits suicide.

== Cast ==
- Hah Myung-joong
- Jeong Yun-hui
- Choi Bool-am
- Hyun Kill-soo
- Han Hye-sook
- Lee Dae-keun
- Han So-ryong
- Shin Woo-chul
- Sin Dong-uk
- Han Tae-il

== Release ==
The Last Witness is widely reported to have been censored due to its sensitive content with between forty minutes and an hour of footage cut from its original length; this is attributed to political repression by the Chun Doo Hwan regime which seized power the year before and perpetrated the Gwangju Massacre six months before the film's release. However, documents from the Ministry of Culture and Public Information and Korean Film Archive indicate that the film passed review on the condition of cuts totalling only four minutes: Son's gang rape, Prosecutor Kim's misconduct, and a court clerk openly demanding a bribe; and that in early November, producer Kim Hwa-sik submitted for review a new, shortened 120-minute cut which would have been favored by film exhibitors. Researcher Cho Jun-hyoung suggests that such documents could have been fabricated, but considers most plausible the conclusion that the production company transferred the blame for the cuts to pre-empt objections from Lee at the film being cut for commercial ends.

The film was restored in 4K by the Korean Film Archive for a retrospective exhibition of Lee Doo-yong's films at Busan International Film Festival in 2016. The Archive released a Blu-ray disc in 2017 with commentary from Lee as well as directors Park Chan-wook and Oh Seung-uk, and critic Inuhiko Yomota.
