= An Affair =

1998 South Korean romantic drama film

- Theatrical release poster
- Hangul: 정사
- Hanja: 情事
- RR: Jeongsa
- MR: Chŏngsa
- Directed by: E J-yong
- Written by: Kim Dae-woo; E J-yong
- Produced by: Oh Jeong-wan; Lee Se-ho
- Starring: Lee Mi-sook; Lee Jung-jae
- Cinematography: Kim Young-cheol
- Edited by: Hahm Sung-won
- Music by: Jo Seong-woo
- Release date: October 3, 1998 (South Korea)
- Running time: 108 minutes
- Country: South Korea
- Language: Korean

An Affair (Korean: 정사; RR: Jeongsa) is a 1998 South Korean romantic drama film. The quiet film about a woman who falls in love with her sister's fiancé was the seventh-highest-grossing Korean film of 1998 and won the Best Asian Film award at the 1999 Newport Beach International Film Festival.

== Plot ==
Seo-hyun is an ordinary housewife in her late thirties with a ten-year-old son and a successful architect husband. For Seo-hyun, life is a series of banal routines, but she is well provided with upper class comforts. Her sheltered life is suddenly threatened with the appearance of U-in, her much younger sister's attractive new fiancé. U-in approaches Seo-hyun and attraction evolves into a passionate affair. Seo-hyun is aware that falling for the younger man will destroy her and her family, but she cannot help herself and the new feelings that are stirring within.

== Cast ==
- Lee Mi-sook as Seo-hyun
- Lee Jung-jae as U-in
- Kim Min as Ji-hyun
- Song Young-chang as Jun-il
