= Untold Scandal =

- Theatrical release poster
- Hangul: 스캔들 - 조선남녀상열지사
- Hanja: 스캔들 - 朝鮮男女相悅之詞
- RR: Seukaendeul - Joseonnamnyeosangyeoljisa
- MR: Sŭk'aendŭl - Chosŏnnamnyŏsangyŏljisa
- Directed by: E J-yong
- Screenplay by: Kim Dae-woo; Kim Hyeon-jeong; E J-yong
- Based on: Les Liaisons dangereuses by Pierre Choderlos de Laclos
- Produced by: Lee Yoo-jin; Oh Jeong-wan
- Starring: Lee Mi-sook; Jeon Do-yeon; Bae Yong-joon
- Cinematography: Kim Byeong-il
- Edited by: Kim Yang-il; Han Seung-ryong
- Music by: Lee Byung-woo
- Production company: Bom Films
- Distributed by: CJ Entertainment
- Release date: October 2, 2003 (South Korea)
- Running time: 123 minutes
- Country: South Korea
- Language: Korean
- Budget: $5 million
- Box office: $5,762,801

Untold Scandal (Korean: 스캔들 - 조선 남녀 상열지사; lit. 'Scandal: The Love Story of Men and Women in Joseon') is a 2003 South Korean historical romantic drama film directed by E J-yong, and starring Lee Mi-sook, Jeon Do-yeon, and Bae Yong-joon. Loosely based on the 1782 French novel Les Liaisons dangereuses, this adaptation takes place in late 18th century Korea, during the Joseon dynasty.

In South Korea, the film was given an R-18 rating by the Korean Film Ethics Commission. The film was a major commercial success, and became the fourth-highest-grossing domestic film of 2003 with 3,522,747 tickets sold nationwide.

== Plot ==
In the Confucian society of Joseon, where men were expected to embody the virtues of a gentleman and women the virtues of a chaste and devoted wife, Lady Cho defies expectations. She has mastered the Confucian classics despite the constraints placed upon her gender. Resentful of her imposed role, she outwardly performs the duties of a virtuous wife but secretly indulges in a game of seduction, asserting control over the men who seek to control her. Her partner in this pursuit is her cousin, Jo-won, a poet, painter, and martial artist who rejects the path of political ambition in favor of a hedonistic lifestyle, openly scorning the patriarchal values of the era. Though bound by an unspoken past, they maintain an alliance in their mutual pursuit of conquest.

But their world of secret liaisons and whispered betrayals is upended when Lady Cho proposes a new challenge—corrupting her husband's young concubine, the innocent and untouched So-ok. Yet Jo-won's desires have already been captured by another: Lady Jeong, a widow revered for her chastity, who has remained faithful to her deceased husband for nine years and been awarded a yeolnyeomun (gate of virtuous women) for her devotion. Unlike his previous conquests, Lady Jeong is no easy prey. A devout Catholic and a woman of unwavering principles, she is as untouchable as she is alluring. Determined to break the unbreakable, Jo-won embarks on a relentless pursuit, setting the stage for a battle of wills between the era's most notorious libertine and the most unyielding of virtuous women.

== Cast ==
- Lee Mi-sook – Lady Cho (Marquise de Merteuil)
- Jeon Do-yeon – Lady Jeong (Présidente de Tourvel)
- Bae Yong-joon – Jo-won (Vicomte de Valmont)
- Jo Hyun-jae – Kwon In-ho (Cécile's music tutor, Chevalier Danceny)
- Lee So-yeon – Lee So-ok (Cécile de Volanges)
- Lee Mi-ji – So-ok's mother (Madame de Volanges, Cécile's mother)
- – Madam Jo's husband (Merteuil's former lover, the Comte de Gercourt)
- Choi Ban-ya – Chu Wol-yi
- Choi Sung-min – slave
- Jeon Yang-ja – Vice-Premier's wife
- Seo Yoon-ah – Jung-geum
- Han Yi-bin – Eun-sil
- Jung Jae-jin – elder 2
- Kong Ho-suk – elder 3
- Na Han-il – Nobleman Yoo

== Differences from the original novel ==
Monsieur de Tourvel (Madame de Tourvel / Lady Jeong's husband), who was away for a court case in the novel, is deceased in the film, making Lady Jeong a widow of nine years. Furthermore, Lady Jeong lived in Ganghwa Island, but is sojourning in Seoul to avoid a plague in her hometown.

Jo-won (Vicomte de Valmont) and Lady Jo (Marquise de Merteuil) cousins are in the film (Jo-won being the younger cousin), and it is revealed that Jo-won's first love was Lady Jo, whereas in the novel, they were former lovers and new rivals, yet using the same tools for their revenge: sex.

Marquise de Merteuil (Lady Jo)'s former lover, the Comte de Gercourt, is arranged to be Cécile's future husband in the novel, while in the film, his character is attributed to Lady Jo's husband. In So-ok's case, she is being made into a concubine of Lady Jo's husband for the continuity of the family lineage, with the elders' consent.

Lee So-ok (Cécile de Volanges) was ushered into Lady Jo's care to be the concubine of her husband. Lady Jo is conspiring with Jo-won to make her pregnant for revenge, intending to reveal to truth to her husband on his deathbed.

Chevalier Danceny was originally Cécile's music tutor in the novel, but in the film, Kwon In-ho is the youngest son of Lady Jo's neighbour, and also Lady Jeong's cousin.

== Awards and nominations ==
2003 Pusan International Film Festival

- NETPAC Award

2003 Blue Dragon Film Awards

- Best New Actor – Bae Yong-joon
- Nomination – Best Actress – Jeon Do-yeon
- Nomination – Best Actress – Lee Mi-sook

2004 Baeksang Arts Awards

- Best New Actor – Bae Yong-joon

2004 Verona Film Festival

- Stefano Reggiani Prize (from the Veneto's Order of Journalists)
- Best Artistic, Technical, or Creative Contribution

2004 Grand Bell Awards

- Best Costume Design – Jung Ku-ho, Kim Hee-ju
- Nomination – Best Film
- Nomination – Best Director – E J-yong
- Nomination – Best Actress – Jeon Do-yeon
- Nomination – Best Actress – Lee Mi-sook
- Nomination – Best New Actor – Bae Yong-joon
- Nomination – Best Planning – Lee Yoo-jin
- Nomination – Best Adapted Screenplay – Kim Dae-woo, E J-yong, Kim Hyeon-jeong
- Nomination – Best Cinematography – Kim Byeong-il
- Nomination – Best Art Direction – Jung Ku-ho
- Nomination – Best Music – Lee Byung-woo

2004 Shanghai International Film Festival

- Best Director – E J-yong
- Best Music – Lee Byung-woo
- Best Visual Effects – Lee Jeon-hyeong
- Best Sound Effects – Lee Seung-chul

2004 Korean Film Awards

- Best Art Direction – Jung Ku-ho
- Nomination – Best Actress – Lee Mi-sook
- Nomination – Best Director – E J-yong
- Nomination – Best Cinematography – Kim Byeong-il
- Nomination – Best Music – Lee Byung-woo
