= Kim Dae-woo =

South Korean filmmaker (born 1962)

- Born: 1962 (age 63–64); South Korea
- Occupations: Film director, screenwriter
- Years active: 1993-present

Korean name
- Hangul: 김대우
- RR: Gim Daeu
- MR: Kim Taeu

Kim Dae-woo (Korean: 김대우; born 1962) is a South Korean film director and screenwriter. Kim started his filmmaking career by winning the 1991 Korean Film Council Screenplay Contest. He was an accomplished screenwriter with a number of hit scripts, including The Girl for Love and The One for Marriage (1993), An Affair (1998), Rainbow Trout (1999), and Untold Scandal (2003). Making a switch to directing, he debuted with the hit period drama film Forbidden Quest (2006), followed by The Servant (2010) and Obsessed (2014). Forbidden Quest won the Best New Director at the 42nd Baeksang Arts Awards, and Best New Director and Best Screenplay at the 26th Korean Association of Film Critics Awards in 2006.

== Filmography ==
=== As screenwriter ===
- The Girl for Love and The One for Marriage (1993)
- Wedding Story 2 (1994)
- Pirates (1994)
- Kill the Love (1996)
- Ivan the Mercenary (1997)
- An Affair (1998)
- Rainbow Trout (1999)
- The Foul King (2000)
- Untold Scandal (2003)

=== As director ===
- Forbidden Quest (2006) (also credited as screenwriter)
- The Servant (2010) (also credited as screenwriter)
- Age of Milk (short film, 2011)
- Obsessed (2014) (also credited as screenwriter, producer, planner)
- The Witch (2016)
- Hidden Face (2024)

=== As script editor ===
- The Police, Chil-duk, and Buddhist Monk (1990)
- Final Blow (1996)
- Road Movie (2002)

=== As TV screenwriter ===
- Servant, The Untold Story of Bang-ja (Channel CGV, 2011) (also credited as executive producer)

== Awards ==
- 2006 42nd Baeksang Arts Awards: Best New Director (Forbidden Quest)
- 2006 26th Korean Association of Film Critics Awards: Best New Director (Forbidden Quest)
- 2006 26th Korean Association of Film Critics Awards: Best Screenplay (Forbidden Quest)
- 2010 11th Busan Film Critics Awards: Best Screenplay (The Servant)
