= Bae Chang-ho =

South Korean filmmaker (born 1953)

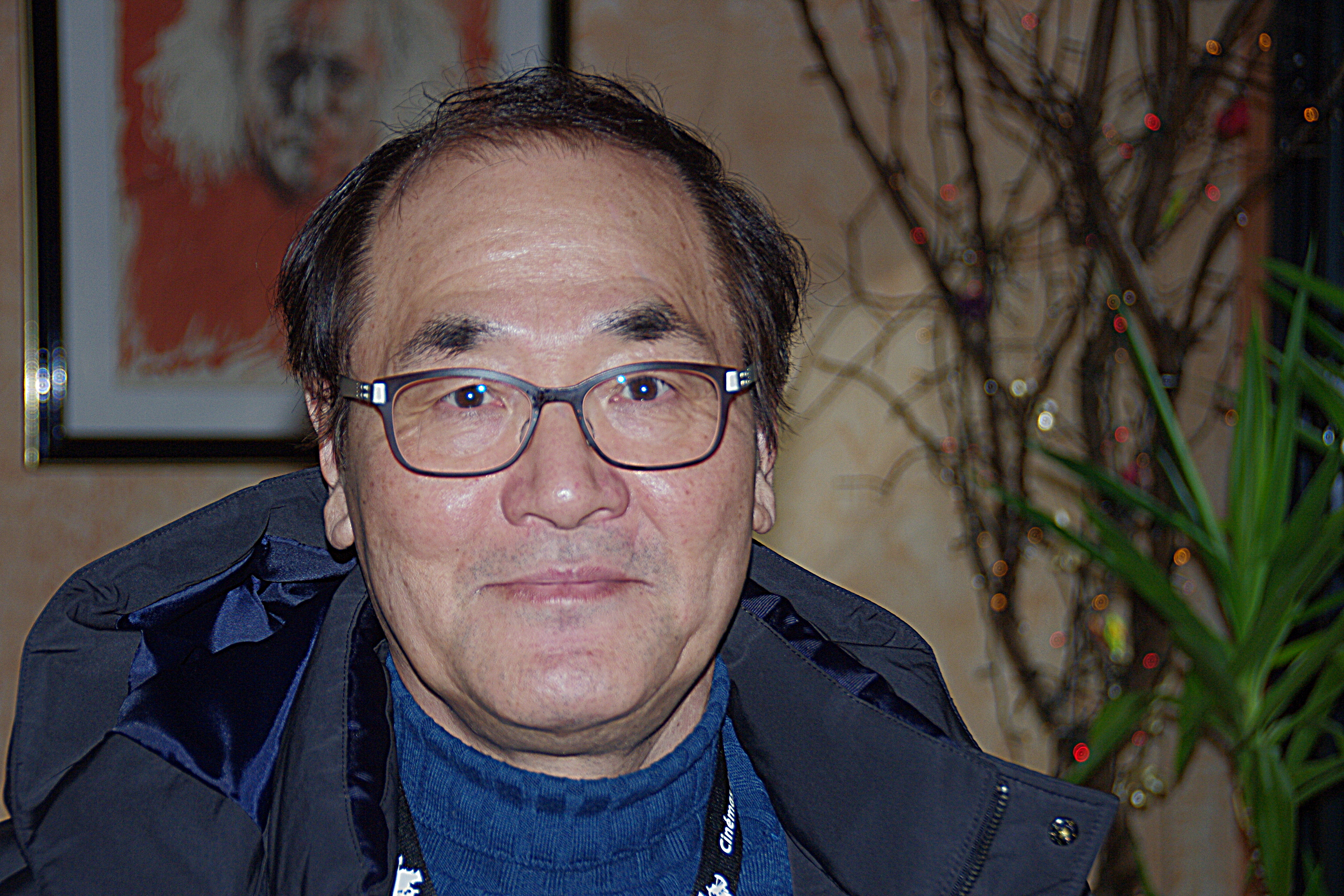
- Bae Chang-ho in 2019
- Born: May 16, 1953 (age 73); South Korea
- Occupations: Film director, screenwriter

Korean name
- Hangul: 배창호
- Hanja: 裵昶浩
- RR: Bae Changho
- MR: Pae Ch'angho

Bae Chang-ho (Korean: 배창호; born May 16, 1953) is a South Korean director and screenwriter.

== Filmography ==
- People of Kkobang Neighborhood (1982) - director, screenwriter
- Iron Men (1983) - director, screenwriter
- Flower on the Equator (1983) - director
- Whale Hunting (1984) - director
- The Winter That Year Was Warm (1984) - director
- Deep Blue Night (1985) - director
- Whale Hunting 2 (1985) - director
- Hwang Jin-yi (1986) - director
- Our Sweet Days of Youth (1987) - director, screenwriter
- Hello, God! (1987) - director
- Gagman (1989) - screenwriter, actor
- The Dream (1990) - director, screenwriter
- Stairways of Heaven (1992) - director
- The Young Man (1994) - director, screenwriter, producer
- Love Story (1996) - director, screenwriter, producer, actor
- My Heart (2000) - director, screenwriter, producer
- The Last Witness (2001) - director, screenwriter
- Road (2006) - director, screenwriter, actor
- The Trip (2010) - director, screenwriter
- Casa Amor: Exclusive for Ladies (2015) - actor

== Awards ==
- 1983 3rd Korean Association of Film Critics Awards: Best Director (People of Kkobang Neighborhood)
- 1984 4th Korean Association of Film Critics Awards: Best Director (Whale Hunting)
- 1985 24th Grand Bell Awards: Best Director (Deep Blue Night)
- 1988 8th Korean Association of Film Critics Awards: Best Screenplay (Our Sweet Days of Youth)
- 1996 16th Korean Association of Film Critics Awards: Best Screenplay (Love Story)
- 2000 1st Busan Film Critics Awards: Best Director (My Heart)
