= E J-yong =

South Korean film director and screenwriter

- Born: Lee Jae-yong; September 5, 1966 (age 60); Daejeon, South Korea
- Education: Hankuk University of Foreign Studies - Turkish; Korean Academy of Film Arts - Filmmaking
- Occupations: Film director, screenwriter
- Years active: 1990-present

Korean name
- Hangul: 이재용
- Hanja: 李在容
- RR: I Jaeyong
- MR: I Chaeyong

E J-yong (Korean: 이재용; born September 5, 1966) is a South Korean film director and screenwriter. His feature films include An Affair (1998), Untold Scandal (2003), Dasepo Naughty Girls (2006), and Actresses (2009).

== Early life ==
E J-yong (his preferred stylized, phonetic spelling; more conventionally romanized as Lee Jae-yong) was born in Daejeon, South Chungcheong Province in 1966. He studied Turkish at Hankuk University of Foreign Studies. After graduating from university, he went backpacking around the world in the late 1980s and fell in love with cinema. E said, "I saw Who Framed Roger Rabbit in Germany, Au revoir les enfants in London, and Barry Lyndon and Pelle the Conqueror in Australia. After I came home, I had to choose a job and movies were the only thing I was interested in. I couldn't imagine wearing a suit and working in a bank." E entered the Korean Academy of Film Arts in 1990 and studied filmmaking.

== Career ==
He first became known for his 19-minute short film, Homo Videocus (1990) which he co-directed with Daniel H. Byun (Byun Hyuk), and which won the Prix Recherche (Research Prize) and Prix de la Jeunesse (Youth Jury Prize) at the Clermont-Ferrand International Short Film Festival, and the Best Short Narrative award at the 1992 San Francisco International Film Festival. E went on to make other short films such as My Mother's Summer and Time in the Mirror. In 1994 his documentary project, The Story of a City, was stopped in mid-production due to problems with the production company.

Finally breaking his long silence in 1998, he presented his feature film debut An Affair, about a woman who starts an affair with her sister's fiance. It won great acclaim both from audiences and critics for E's minimalist, sophisticated sense of directing. The film, which resurrected the career of actress Lee Mi-sook, was presented at the third Pusan International Film Festival, and went on to become the seventh highest-grossing Korean film of the year. An Affair won the Grand Prize at the 1999 Fukuoka Asian Film Festival, as well as the Asian Cinema Kaleidoscope Prize at the Newport Beach Film Festival, and the Critics Prize and Best Artistic, Technical, or Creative Contribution at the Verona Film Festival.

E's second feature, Asako in Ruby Shoes in 2000, is one of the first instances of a Korean-Japanese co-production that utilized cast and crew members in both countries on more or less equal terms. Using a Korean crew for the scenes set in Seoul, and a Japanese crew for the shooting in Japan, the film starred Lee Jung-jae as the protagonist (he was also the lead actor of An Affair). Although not a commercial hit, the film played at several festivals, drawing notice among academics for its portrayal of the interplay between Japanese, Chinese and Korean cultures and receiving widely divergent critical assessments.

Then in the fall of 2003, E presented his costume drama Untold Scandal, based on the French novel Les Liaisons dangereuses but set in 18th-century Korea. An unexpected smash hit, it set a new record for the biggest opening weekend for a Korean film and went on to sell over three million tickets. The film also marked the first major film role of TV actor Bae Yong-joon, who would go on to become a popular sensation in Japan in 2004. Staying true to the spirit of the original novel while giving it an entirely new aesthetic, E kept a familiar story interesting with unexpected juxtapositions (for example, a mix of classical European and Korean music in the soundtrack), visual elegance, and efficient storytelling. The film won several awards at the 2004 Verona Film Festival and Shanghai International Film Festival, including Best Director for E.

E cast Jo Hyun-jae and Lee So-yeon (who played supporting roles in Untold Scandal) in his short titled Joy of Love, which was released online in late 2004.

Given his demonstrated flair for scandalous topics and his new-generation attitude towards moral issues, for his next film E adapted the controversial webcomic Dasepo Girls, which revolved around a high school where the students are sex addicts, the teachers are perverts, and virtually nothing was forbidden. His 2006 film Dasepo Naughty Girls was a campy and playful musical comedy, with a candy-colored palette and mildly racy content. Though praised for the diversity of its characters and their preferences, it grossed US$3.8 million, which for Korean films of average budget is considered a disappointing performance.

E's next project Homecoming was selected by the Hong Kong Asia Film Financing Forum (HAF) in 2007. He described it as a "long look through the past" in order to understand his own father more deeply, including the Korean War ("a world colonized and liberated, a war, a country divided, the loss of his hometown, and a family separated"), and the death of E's mother.

In 2009, E gathered an ensemble cast of six of Korea's top female thespians (Youn Yuh-jung, Lee Mi-sook, Go Hyun-jung, Choi Ji-woo, Kim Min-hee, Kim Ok-vin) for his low-budget, semi-improvisational mockumentary Actresses. Set during a fashion magazine shoot on Christmas Eve, the film depicted the celebrity and humanity of actresses, with the cast all using their real-life names and telling candid stories. It became the third of E's creations to be invited to the Berlin International Film Festival's Panorama section.

E, along with fellow directors Kang Hyeong-cheol and Jang Hoon were commissioned by the producers of the Samsung Galaxy Note in 2012 to make three short films for their PPL-frequent-film project Cine Note. The team also included Lee Seung-chul for the music, and noted webtoon artists Sohn Je-ho and Lee Gwang-soo who created the film's animated content.

But while shooting his Cine Note short How to Fall in Love in 10 Minutes, E simultaneously decided to expand the idea into an experimental feature about remote directing, i.e. making a movie via mobile devices and the Internet without being on set. The result was Behind the Camera, in which E took the mockumentary genre a surreal step further than Actresses by including himself in the cast. As E makes an unprecedented attempt to direct the film from Los Angeles via Skype, chaotic and unpredictable circumstances arise behind the scenes as the cast and crew become frustrated without a director to guide them on set, blurring the line between fiction and reality. E said it was "difficult to decide how to classify the film in terms of genre. The feature film seems to be a documentary about the production process of a short film, but it also has dramatic elements similar to a reality show."

In 2014, E directed and co-wrote My Brilliant Life, a film adaptation of Kim Aeran's novel My Palpitating Life. He cast Kang Dong-won and Song Hye-kyo as young parents of a boy with progeria, a genetic disorder that causes rapid aging. Members of E's crew were trained by Oscar-winning special make-up effects artist Greg Cannom.

E next wrote the screenplay of The Bacchus Lady, a film about a female senior citizens who sell sex and soft drinks to male senior citizens; it entered pre-production in 2015.

== Filmography ==
=== Film ===
| Year | Title | | Role | Note | Ref. |
| Year | English | Korean | Role | Note | Ref. |
|---|---|---|---|---|---|
| 1998 | An Affair | 정사 | director, screenplay | | |
| 2000 | Asako in Ruby Shoes | 순애보 | director, screenplay, editor | Korean-Japanese co-production | |
| 2003 | Untold Scandal | 스캔들 - 조선남녀상열지사 | director, screenplay | | |
| 2006 | Dasepo Naughty Girls | 다세포 소녀 | director, screenplay | | |
| 2009 | Actresses | 여배우들 | director, screenplay, producer | | |
| 2013 | Behind the Camera | 뒷담화: 감독이 미쳤어요 | director, screenplay, executive producer | | |
| 2014 | My Brilliant Life | 두근두근 내 인생 | director, screenplay | | |
| 2016 | The Bacchus Lady | 죽여주는 여자 | director, screenplay | | |
| 2019 | The Big Picture | | director | | |

=== Short film ===
- How to Fall in Love in 10 Minutes (short film from Cine Note, 2012) – director
- Homecoming (2008) – director
- Joy of Love (short film, 2004) – director
- My Mother's Summer (1999) – director
- Time in the Mirror – director
- Homo Videocus (short film, 1990) – director, screenplay, cinematographer

== Accolades ==
| Year | Award | Category | Recipient(s) and nominee(s) | Result | Reference |
|---|---|---|---|---|---|
| 2015 | Udine Far East Festival | Audience Award | My Brilliant Life | 3rd place | |
