= Na Dohyang =

Korean writer (1902–1927)

- Born: 30 March 1902; Seoul, Korean Empire
- Died: 26 August 1927 (aged 25)
- Writing career
- Language: Korean

Korean name
- Hangul: 나경손
- Hanja: 羅慶孫
- RR: Na Gyeongson
- MR: Na Kyŏngson

Art name
- Hangul: 빈
- Hanja: 彬
- RR: Bin
- MR: Pin

Pen name
- Hangul: 나도향
- Hanja: 羅稻香
- RR: Na Dohyang
- MR: Na Tohyang

Na Dohyang (Korean: 나도향, 30 March 1902 – 26 August 1927) was a Korean writer born in Seoul.

== Biography ==
He graduated from the Pai Chai School and entered Keijō Imperial University School of Medicine. However he went to Japan aspiring to find fame in literature. This pursuit of learning about literature didn't last long, because he didn't have the money to support himself. He became a high school teacher in Andong, Gyeongsang-do.

He started his career as a writer publishing A Young Man's Life (젊은이의 시절). His famous works include The Water Wheel (물레방아), Mulberry (뽕), and Deaf Samryongi (벙어리 삼룡이).

== Work ==
Na went by the art name Na Bin. His early works are sorrowful, romantic pieces: A Young Man's Life, Delight (환희). However his works changed from romanticism to realism: Haengnang Jasik <행랑 자식> and Before She Found Herself (자기를 찾기 전), in which he describes a man who overcomes difficulties by the strength of his will. His works depict Korean farm villages and people, and life during the 1920s. His last novel criticized the society and reality of his time.

The Literature Translation Institute of Korea analyzes his work:

Na Dohyang’s early works reveal romantic inclinations characteristic of an author who has yet to acquire a mature perspective. “Season of Youth” (Jeolmeuniui sijeol), his debut story, and “Do Not Cry Should You Embrace a Star” (Byeoreul angeodeun uljina malgeol) are full of emotional, dreamy sentimentalism, and have often been criticized for overabundance of modifiers. With the publication of “The Lady Barber” (Yeo-ibalsa, 1923), however, Na began to move away from the romantic vision to acquire a more objective perspective and realistic voice. “Samryong the Mute” (Beongeori samnyongi), one of his best-known works, gives a tragic account of an ugly, mute servant who falls in love with his beautiful, kind-hearted mistress. The servant’s ill-fated love is akin to man’s admiration and longing for ultimate beauty which cannot be attained. A naturalist as well as realist fiction in essence, the story also displays the author’s growing awareness of the class issues and concern for those who belong to the lowest rung in the social strata. Though Na Dohyang never embraced proletarian literature movement, he continued to explore the grim reality of the abject poor in “Mulberry” (Ppong), a story of a woman who prostitutes herself to villagers in order to support herself. The theme receives a more pronounced treatment in The Watermill (Mullaebanga); a tenant-farmer, whose wife is seduced by the landowner, ends up murdering his wife and committing suicide. Although love continues to be a dominant subject matter in Na Dohyang’s later works, it does not remain a mere romantic vision, but becomes a tool for investigating brutality nascent in human beings as well as the sexual corruption caused by unjust society.

== Deaf Samryongi ==
Deaf Samryongi is considered one of the best newspaper serial stories of Korean literature. The novel has been adapted into a movie by Na Woon-gyu in 1929, and Shin Sang-ok in 1964. For his work in the 1964 The Deaf Samryongi, leading actor Kim Jin-kyu was awarded Best Actor in the 12th Asian Film Festival.
