= Lee Doo-yong =

South Korean film director (1942–2024)

- 이두용
- Born: December 24, 1942; Keijō, Korea, Empire of Japan
- Died: January 19, 2024 (aged 81); Seoul, South Korea
- Occupations: Film director, screenwriter

Korean name
- Hangul: 이두용
- Hanja: 李斗鏞
- RR: I Duyong
- MR: I Tuyong

Lee Doo-yong (Korean: 이두용; December 24, 1942 – January 19, 2024) was a South Korean film director. After his debut in 1969 with the film The Lost Wedding Veil (1970), Lee made more than 60 films in a wide array of genres. In the 1970s, he introduced Korean-style action films, including The Korean Connection (1974) and Left Foot of Wrath (1974). His film Mulleya Mulleya (1984) created great controversy in the Korean media as well as in the West, due to the graphic portrayal of a woman's subjugated life during the Yi Dynasty. Lee Doo-yong died in Seoul from lung cancer on January 19, 2024, at the age of 81.

== Filmography ==
=== As director ===
- The Lost Wedding Veil (1970)
- Is Your Husband Like This Too? (1971)
- A Sudden Calamity (1971)
- My Older Brother (sequel) (1971)
- A Guilty Woman (1971)
- A Chinese Ghost (1971)
- Some Married Couple (1971)
- Don't Go (1972)
- Where Should I Go? (1972)
- Ever Smiling Mr. Park (1972)
- I Will Give It All (1972)
- A Warrant for an Arrest (1973)
- The General in Red Robes (1973)
- Manchurian Tiger (1974)
- Bridge of Death (1974)
- A Little Bird (1974)
- The Korean Connection (1974)
- Returned Single-Legged Man 2 (1974)
- Left Foot of Wrath (1974)
- A Betrayer (1974)
- Disarmament (1975)
- At The Risk of Life (1975)
- Byeong-Tae's Impressive Days (1975)
- Black Night (1975)
- Bruce Lee Fights Back from the Grave (1976)
- Secret Agents 2 (1977)
- 44th Street, New York (1977)
- The Early Years (1977)
- Confession of Life or Death (1978)
- The Last Heist (1979)
- Rely on Your Brother (1979)
- Muldori Village (1979)
- 49 Days in Hell (1979)
- Police Story (1979)
- Three Women Under the Umbrella (1980)
- The Last Witness (1980)
- Two Heroes (1980)
- The Haunted Villa (1981)
- The Hut (1981)
- The Trouble-solving Broker (1982)
- The Swamp of Desire (1982)
- Strange Relationship (1983)
- Mulleya Mulleya (1984)
- Day and Night (1984)
- The Oldest Son (1985)
- The Fool (1985)
- Mulberry (1986)
- The Fool 2 (1986)
- Eunuch (1986)
- Highway (1987)
- Karma (1988)
- Mulberry 2 (1989)
- Silent Assassins (1989)
- Road to Cheongsong Prison (1990)
- Black Snow (1991)
- Mulberry 3 (1992)
- Pro at Love, Amateur at Marriage (1994)
- The Great Hunter G. J. (1995)
- L'Amour (1999)
- Arirang (2003)
- A Journey with Korean Masters (2013)

=== As screenwriter ===
- The Lost Wedding Veil (1970)
- The General in Red Robes (1973)
- Manchurian Tiger (1974)
- Rely on Your Brother (1979)
- The Oldest Son (1985)
- The Fool 2 (1986)
- Karma (1988)
- Black Snow (1991)
- The Great Hunter G. J. (1995)
- L'Amour (1999)
- Arirang (2003)

== Awards ==
- 1983 22nd Grand Bell Awards: Best Director (Mulleya Mulleya)
- 1990 10th Korean Association of Film Critics Awards: Best Director (Road to Cheongsong Prison)
