= The Last Witness (2001 film) =

2001 South Korean thriller film by Bae Chang-ho

- Theatrical release poster
- Hangul: 흑수선
- RR: Heuksuseon
- MR: Hŭksusŏn
- Directed by: Bae Chang-ho
- Written by: Bae Chang-ho
- Based on: The Last Witness by Kim Seong-jong
- Produced by: Jeong Tae-won
- Starring: Lee Jung-jae; Lee Mi-yeon; Ahn Sung-ki; Jung Joon-ho
- Cinematography: Kim Yun-su
- Edited by: Kim Hyun
- Music by: Choi Kyung-shik
- Distributed by: Cinema Service
- Release date: November 16, 2001
- Running time: 106 minutes
- Country: South Korea
- Language: Korean

The Last Witness (Korean: 흑수선; RR: Heuksuseon) is a 2001 South Korean action thriller film written and directed by Bae Chang-ho, starring Lee Jung-jae, Lee Mi-yeon, Ahn Sung-ki, and Jung Joon-ho. It is based on the novel of the same name by Kim Seong-jong, and is the second adaptation of the book, the first being in 1980.

== Synopsis ==
A political prisoner, Hwang-seok is released after 50 years of solitary confinement. A day later, a body with stab wounds is recovered from a harbor. Detective Oh investigates the death and determines the body is that of Yang, a former soldier. Discovering a diary amongst Yang's possessions, Oh follows a trail of clues to a blind antique dealer, Ji-hye. It transpires that it was Yang who was responsible for the imprisonment of Hwang-seok, a suspected communist sympathizer in the Korean War. This makes Hwang-seok the prime suspect for the murder of Yang. But not all is as it seems, and a series of flashbacks back to the dark days of the Korean War and the infamous Geoje POW Camp on Geojedo leads Oh to Han, a former North Korean soldier living in Japan, and a final, tragic resolution for two ill-fated lovers.

== Cast ==
- Lee Jung-jae as Detective Oh
- Lee Mi-yeon as Ji-hye
- Ahn Sung-ki as Hwang-seok
- Jung Joon-ho as Han Dong-ju
- Lee Ki-young as Yang

== See also ==
- Cinema of Korea
