= I Will Survive (1993 film) =

- Film poster
- Hangul: 살어리랏다
- RR: Sareoriratda
- MR: Sarŏriratta
- Directed by: Yoon Sam-yook
- Written by: Yoon Sam-yook
- Produced by: Yun Tae-yeong; Lee Sang-woon; Kim Se-chang
- Starring: Lee Deok-hwa; Lee Mi-yeon
- Cinematography: Son Hyeon-chae
- Edited by: Hyeon Dae-won
- Music by: Lee Jong-sik
- Production companies: Koryo Films Co., Ltd.
- Release date: August 21, 1993
- Running time: 108 minutes
- Country: South Korea
- Language: Korean

I Will Survive is a 1993 South Korean historical drama film written and directed by Yoon Sam-yook. It was entered into the 18th Moscow International Film Festival where Lee Deok-hwa won the award for Best Actor.

== Plot ==
Man-seok is an executioner from the butcher caste and therefore discriminated against. One day, he receives a request from a noble family that one of their condemned be executed without his head being cut off. Man-seok does as instructed, but when his payment is delivered by Sug-young, the daughter of the executed, he rapes her, motivated by his deep resentment against the ruling elite. Later, she is arrested and sold into slavery. Feeling guilty, Man-seok buys her freedom, and the two eventually fall in love and settle down to a peaceful married life. However, their happiness is threatened when they are involved in a conspiracy against the enemies of Sug-young's family.

== Cast ==
- Lee Deok-hwa ... Man-seok
- Lee Mi-yeon ... Sug-young
- Jang Hang-sun
- Lee Il-woong
- Nam Bo-won
- Yang Taek-jo
- Sunwoo Yong-nyeo
