= 16th Busan International Film Festival =

2011 edition of film festival

- Opening film: Always
- Closing film: Chronicle of My Mother
- Location: Busan, South Korea
- Hosted by: Uhm Ji-won; Ye Ji-won
- Festival date: October 6 to October 14, 2011

Busan International Film Festival
- 17th 15th

The 16th Busan International Film Festival was held from October 6 to October 14, 2011, at the Busan Cinema Center and was hosted by actresses Uhm Ji-won and Ye Ji-won, making it the first year to be hosted by two women.

The 16th BIFF also marks the first year for Lee Yong-kwan as the festival director after the retirement of its founding director, Kim Dong-ho and is also the first to take place at the Busan Cinema Center which was opened on September 29, 2011.

A total of 307 films from 70 countries were invited to participate in the festival, with 86 world premieres and 39 international premieres. The event had a total audience of 196,177.

== Program ==
† World Premiere
†† International Premiere

=== Opening Film ===
English title	Original title	Director(s)	Production country/countries	
Always	오직 그대만; Ohjik Geudaeman (lit. "Only You")	Song Il-gon	South Korea	†

=== Gala Presentation ===
English title	Original title	Director(s)	Production country/countries	
Cut		Amir Naderi	Japan; France; United States	
Dragon	武俠; Wǔ xiá	Peter Chan	Hong Kong, China	
The Host 3D	괴물; Goemul (lit. "Monster")	Bong Joon-ho	South Korea	†
The Lady		Luc Besson	France; United Kingdom	
Life Without Principle	奪命金; Duó Mìng Jīn	Johnnie To	Hong Kong, China	
A Reason to Live	오늘; Oneul (lit. "Today")	Lee Jeong-hyang	South Korea	†
Unbowed	부러진 화살; Bureojin Hwasal	Chung Ji-young	South Korea	†

=== A Window on Asian Cinema ===
English title	Original title	Director(s)	Production country/countries	
11 Flowers	我11 wǒ shí yī	Wang Xiaoshuai	China	
Alms for a Blind Horse	Anhe Ghore Da Daan	Gurvinder Singh	India	
Amok		Lawrence Fajardo	Philippines	††
The Beetle Soldiers	Serdadu kumbang	Ari Shiasale	Indonesia	††
Celestial Kingdom	天国; Tian guó	Wang Chao	China	†
A Cube of Sugar	یک حبه قند; Yek habe ghand	Seyyed Reza Mir-Karimi	Iran	
Daughter...Father...Daughter	Dokhtar...Pedar...Dokhtar	Panahbarkhoda Rezaee	Iran	†
Death Is My Profession	Marg kasb va kare man ast	Amir Hossein Saghafi	Iran	†
Eternity	ชั่วฟ้าดินสลาย	Bhandevanov Devakula	Thailand	††
Fable of the Fish	Isda	Adolfo Alix, Jr.	Philippines	
Final Whistle	سوت پایان; Sout-e payan	Niki Karimi	Iran	††
Goodbye	به امید دیدار; Be omid e didar	Mohammad Rasoulof	Iran	
Guilty of Romance	恋の罪; Koi no Tsumi	Sion Sono	Japan	
Guzaarish	गुज़ारिश; Request	Sanjay Leela Bhansali	India	
Himizu	ヒミズ	Sion Sono	Japan	
Habibi		Susan Youssef	Palestine; Netherlands; United Arab Emirates; United States	
Hanaan	하나안	Ruslan Park	Uzbekistan; South Korea	
Hanezu	朱花の月; Hanezu no tsuki	Naomi Kawase	Japan	
Hankyu Railway - A 15-Minute Miracle	阪急電車 片道15分の奇跡; Hankyu Densha	Yoshishige Miyake	Japan	††
Hara-Kiri: Death of a Samurai	一命; Ichimei	Takashi Miike	Japan	
Here, There	这里，那里	Lu Sheng	China	
I Wish	奇跡; Kiseki (lit. "Miracle")	Hirokazu Koreeda	Japan	
Inseparable	形影不离	Dayyan Eng	China	†
Jakarta Twilight	Jakarta Maghrib	Salman Aristo	Indonesia	††
Jump Ashin!	翻滚吧！阿信	Lin Yu-hsien	Taiwan	††
Kausar		Gulsina Mirgaliyeva	Kazakhstan	†
Kotoko		Shinya Tsukamoto	Japan	
Life Back Then	アントキノイノチ; Antoki no Inochi	Takahisa Zeze	Japan	
Lost in Paradise	Hot boy nổi loạn (lit. "Rebellious Hot Boy")	Vũ Ngọc Đãng	Vietnam	
Lovely Man		Teddy Soeriaatmadja	Indonesia	†
Mask	Maskara	Laurice Guillen	Philippines	††
Mitsuko Delivers	ハラがコレなんで; Hara ga Kore Nande	Yuya Ishii	Japan	
Mother's Paradise	Ray dlya Mamy	Aktan Arym Kubat	Kazakhstan	
Mr. Tree	Hello，树先生！ Hello! Shu Xian Sheng	Han Jie	China	
My Back Page	マイ・バック・ページ; Mai Bakku Peji	Yamashita Nobuhiro	Japan	
Nobel Thief	নোবেল চোর; Nobel Chor	Suman Ghosh	India	†
Nono		Rommel Tolentino	Philippines	††
P-047	แต่เพียงผู้เดียว; Tae Peang Phu Deaw	Kongdej Jaturanrasmee	Thailand	
Scabbard Samurai	さや侍; Saya Zamurai	Hitoshi Matsumoto	Japan	
Seediq Bale	賽德克•巴萊; Sàidékè Balái	Wei Te-sheng	Taiwan	
Stanley Ka Dabba	स्टैनली का डब्बा	Amole Gupte	India	
The Address	Melvilasom	Madhav Ramadasan	India	†
The Sword Identity	倭寇的踪迹; Wo Kou De Zong Ji	Xu Haofeng	China	
The Temple	देऊळ; Deool	Umesh Vinayak Kulkarni	India	†
Tokyo Playboy Club	東京プレイボーイクラブ	Yosuke Okuda	Japan	†
Three and a Half	سه و نیم; Se o Nim	Naghi Nemati	Iran	†
Urumi - The Warriors Who Wanted to Kill Vasco Da Gama	ഉറുമി Urumi	Santosh Sivan	India	
The Woman in the Septic Tank	Ang Babae Sa Septic Tank	Marlon Rivera	Philippines	

=== New Currents ===
English title	Original title	Director(s)	Production country/countries	
August Drizzle	නිකිණි වැස්ස; Nikini Wessa	Aruna Jayawardana	Sri Lanka	†
Choked	가시; Gashi	Kim Joong-hyun	South Korea	†
Damn Life	ダムライフ	Kitagawa Hitoshi	Japan	††
Here...or There?	Do Hay Day	Siu Pham	Vietnam; Switzerland	†
I Carried You Home	ปาดังเบซาร์	Tongpong Chantarangkul	Thailand; Singapore	†
Lost in Mountain		Gao Zipeng	China	†
The Mirror Never Lies	Laut Bercermin ("The Ocean Reflects")	Kamila Andini	Indonesia	†
Mourning	Soog	Morteza Farshbaf	Iran	†
Niño		Loy Arcenas	Philippines	††
The Passion of a Man named Choe Che-u	동학, 수운 최제우; DongHwa, Soowoon Choe Che-u	Stanley Park	South Korea	†
Return to Burma		Midi Z	Myanmar; Taiwan	†
Starry Starry Night	星空	Tom Lin Shu-yu	Taiwan	
Watch Indian Circus	Dekh Indian Circus	Mangesh Hadawale	India	†

=== Korean Cinema Today - Panorama ===
English title	Original title	Director(s)	Production country/countries	
Amen	아멘	Kim Ki-duk	South Korea	
Come Rain, Come Shine	사랑한다, 사랑하지 않는다; Saranghanda, Saranghaji Anneunda (lit. "I Love You, I Love You Not")	Lee Yoon-ki	South Korea	
The Day He Arrives	북촌 방향; Bukchon Banghyang (lit. Bukchon-bound)	Hong Sang-soo	South Korea	
From Seoul to Varanasi	불륜의 시대; Bulryunui Sidae	Jeon Kyu-hwan	South Korea	
Glove	글러브; Geulreobeu	Kang Woo-suk	South Korea	
Hanji	달빛 길어올리기; Dalbit Kileoolrigi	Im Kwon-taek	South Korea	
Hindsight	푸른소금; Pureun Sogeum (lit. "Blue Salt")	Lee Hyun-seung	South Korea	
Kisses	키스; Kiseu	Directors: Kang Ho-joon; Kim Jin-hee; Hwang Hee-seong; Seo Yong-ho; Lee Jung-won; Moon In-dae; Lee Hyun-chul; Kim Doo-heon	South Korea	†
Pink	핑크; Pingkey	Jeon Soo-il	South Korea	†
Poongsan	풍산개; Pungsangae (lit. "Phungsan Dog")	Juhn Jai-hong	South Korea	
Red Vacance Black Wedding	붉은 바캉스 검은 웨딩; Buleun Bakangseu Geumeun Weding	Park Chul-soo; Kim Tai-sik	South Korea	†
Ryang-kang-do: Merry Christmas, North!	량강도 아이들; Ryangkangdo Aideul	Kim Sung-hoon	South Korea	†
Sunny (Director's Cut)	써니; Sseoni	Kang Hyeong-cheol	South Korea	
War of the Arrows	최종병기 활 Choejongbyeonggi Hwal	Kim Han-min	South Korea	

=== Korean Cinema Today - Vision ===
English title	Original title	Director(s)	Production country/countries	
Barbie	바비; Babi	Lee Sang-woo	South Korea	†
Beautiful Miss Jin	미스진은 예쁘다; Misseu Jineun Yeobbeuda	Jang Hee-chul	South Korea	†
Black Dove	검은 갈매기; Geumeun Katmaegi	Roh Gyeong-tae	South Korea	†
Dangerously Excited	나는 공무원이다; Naneun Kongmuwonida (lit. "I'm a Civil Servant")	Koo Ja-hong	South Korea	†
A Fish	물고기; Mulgogi	Park Hong-min	South Korea	†
Jesus Hospital	밍크코트; Mingkeu Koteu (lit. "Mink Coat")	Shin A-ga; Lee Sang-cheol	South Korea	†
The King of Pigs	돼지의 왕 Dwaejiui wang	Yeon Sang-ho	South Korea	†
The Peach Tree	복숭아나무; Boksunga namu	Ku Hye-sun	South Korea	†
Persimmon	감/Gam	Choo Sang-rok	South Korea	†
Romance Joe	로맨스 조 Romaenseu Jo	Lee Kwang-kuk	South Korea	†

=== Korean Cinema Retrospective ===
==== Kim Kee-duk, On the Front Line of Korean Genre Films ====
English title	Director(s)	Production country/countries
Barefooted Youth	Kim Ki-duk	South Korea
Buy My Fist	Kim Ki-duk	South Korea
Five Marines	Kim Ki-duk	South Korea
Horse-year Bride	Kim Ki-duk	South Korea
I Will Be a King for the Day	Kim Ki-duk	South Korea
Kinship	Kim Soo-yong	South Korea
Monster Yonggari	Kim Ki-duk	South Korea
The North and South	Kim Ki-duk	South Korea
Until That Day	Kim Ki-duk	South Korea

=== World Cinema ===
English title	Original title	Director(s)	Production country/countries	
170 Hz		Joost van Ginkel	Netherlands	††
18 Days	18 يوم	Directors: Marwan Hamed (19-19); Ahmad Alaa (Ashraf Seberto); Sherif El Bendari (Curfew); Kamla Abou Zikri (God’s Creation); Yousry Nasrallah (Interior/Exterior); Sherif Arafa (Retention); Khaled Marei (Revolution Cookies); Mariam Abou Ouf (Tahrir 2/2); Ahmad Abdallah (Window)	Egypt	
Almayer's Folly	La Folie Almayer	Chantal Akerman	France	
Alps	Άλπεις; Alpeis	Yorgos Lanthimos	Greece	
Baikonur		Veit Helmer	Germany; Kazakhstan; Russia	††
The Bad Intentions	Las malas intenciones	Rosario García-Montero	Peru; Germany; Argentina	
The Baron	O Barão	Edgar Pêra	Portugal	
Battle of Warsaw 1920	Bitwa warszawska 1920	Jerzy Hoffman	Poland	
The Beaver		Jodie Foster	United States	
Behold the Lamb		John McIlduff	United Kingdom	
Bellflower		Evan Glodell	United States	
Best Intentions		Adrian Sitaru	Romania	
Blood of My Blood	Sangue do Meu Sangue	João Canijo	Portugal	
Blue Bird		Gust Van Den Berghe	Belgium	
A Bottle in the Gaza Sea	Une bouteille à la mer	Thierry Binisti	France; Canada; Israel	†
Breathing	Atmen	Karl Markovics	Austria	
The Cardboard Village	Il villaggio di cartone	Ermanno Olmi	Italy	
Chicken with Plums	Poulet aux prunes	Marjane Satrapi; Vincent Paronnaud	France; Germany; Belgium	
Declaration of War	La Guerre est déclarée	Valérie Donzelli	France	
Donkeys	Burros	Odín Salazar Flores	Mexico	
The Double Steps	Los pasos dobles	Isaki Lacuesta	Spain; Switzerland	††
Early One Morning	De bon matin	Jean-Marc Moutout	France; Belgium	†
Easy!	Scialla!	Francesco Bruni	Italy	
The Enemy	Neprijatelj	Dejan Zečević	Serbia; Croatia; Hungary; Bosnia and Herzegovina	
Ephemeral Weddings	Noces éphémères ("The Momentary Marriage")	Reza Serkanian	France; Iran	††
Expecting	La Espera	Francisca Fuenzalida	Chile	†
Faust		Alexander Sokurov	Russia	
Footnote	הערת שוליים; He'arat Shulayim	Joseph Cedar	Israel	
Goodbye First Love	Un amour de jeunesse	Mia Hansen-Løve	France; Germany	
Gypsy	Cigán	Martin Šulík	Slovak Republic; Czech Republic	
Hard Core Logo 2		Bruce McDonald	Canada	††
Kinshasa Kids		Marc-Henri Wajnberg	Belgium	
Hot Hot Hot		Beryl Koltz	Luxembourg; Belgium; Austria	
The Hunter		Daniel Nettheim	Australia	
An Insignificant Harvey		Jeff Kopas	Canada	†
Karen Cries in a Bus	Karen llora en un bus	Gabriel Rojas Vera	Colombia	
The Kid with a Bike	Le gamin au vélo	Jean-Pierre Dardenne, Luc Dardenne	Belgium; France; Italy	
King of Devil's Island	Kongen av Bastøy	Marius Holst	Norway; Sweden; Poland; France	
Las Acacias		Pablo Giorgelli	Argentina; Spain	
Le Havre		Aki Kaurismäki	Finland; France; Germany	
Los Viejos		Martín Boulocq	Bolivia	††
Lucky		Gil Cates Jr.	South Africa; United Kingdom	
Mangrove		Julie Gilbert; Frédéric Choffat	Switzerland; France	††
Manipulation		Pascal Verdosci	Switzerland; Germany	
Melancholia		Lars von Trier	Denmark; Sweden; France; Germany	
Missione di pace		Francesco Lagi	Italy	††
On the Ice		Andrew Okpeaha MacLean	United States	
Otelo Burning		Sara Blecher	South Africa	††
Parked		Darragh Byrne	Ireland; Finland	
The Perfect Stranger	El Perfecto Desconocido	Toni Bestard	Spain	†
Pina		Wim Wenders	Germany; France	
Porfirio		Alejandro Landes	Colombia	
Rebellion	L'Ordre et la Morale	Mathieu Kassovitz	France	
Red Dog		Kriv Stenders	Australia	
Restless		Gus Van Sant	United States	
Rose	Róża	Wojciech Smarzowski	Poland	
Seven Acts of Mercy	Sette opere di misericordia	Gianluca De Serio; Massimiliano De Serio	Italy; Romania	
Sleep Tight	Mientras duermes	Jaume Balagueró	Spain	
Sleeping Sickness	Schlafkrankheit	Ulrich Köhler	Germany; France; Netherlands	
Stella Days		Thaddeus O'Sullivan	Ireland	††
Summer Games	Giochi d'estate	Rolando Colla	Switzerland; Italy	
SuperClásico		Ole Christian Madsen	Denmark	
Taj		Winston Furlong	Australia	††
Terraferma		Emanuele Crialese	Italy	
That Summer	Un été brûlant ("A Burning Hot Summer")	Philippe Garrel	France	
Three Sisters T	Trzy siostrzyczki trupki	Maciej Kowalewski	Poland	†
Today I Felt No Fear	Hoy No Tuve Miedo	Iván Fund	Argentina	††
The Tree of Life		Terrence Malick	United States	
Tyrannosaur		Paddy Considine	United Kingdom	
We Have a Pope	Habemus Papam	Nanni Moretti	Italy; France	
We Need to Talk About Kevin		Lynne Ramsay	United Kingdom	
Wetlands		Guy Édoin	Canada	
Yatasto		Hermes Paralluelo	Argentina	

=== Flash Forward ===
English title	Original title	Director(s)	Production country/countries	
Courage	Wymyk	Greg Zgliński	Poland	††
The Idiot	Idioot	Rainer Sarnet	Estonia	†
Joan and the Voices	Zhannan ev Dzajner	Mikayel Vatinyan	Armenia	†
Là-bas: A Criminal Education	Là-bas	Guido Lombardi	Italy	††
Memories Corner		Audrey Fouché	France; Canada	†
My Father is Baryshnikov	Moy papa Baryshnikov	Dmitry Povolotsky; Mark Drugoi	Russia	††
Nuit #1		Anne Émond	Canada	††
The Odds		Simon Davidson	Canada	††
Off White Lies	אורחים לרגע	Maya Kenig	Israel	††
Mesh (Walking)		Shiar Abdî	Turkey; Germany	††

=== Wide Angle ===
==== Korean Short Film Competition ====
English title	Director(s)	Production country/countries	
The Abortion	Shim Hyun-seok	South Korea	†
Anesthesia	Kim Seok-young	South Korea	†
Anywhere in Seoul, 2010	Kim Min-chul	South Korea	†
A Day Is Far Too Long	Lee Seung-yup	South Korea	†
Bugging Heaven; Listen to Her	Oh Hyun-ju	South Korea	†
Herstory	Kim Jun-ki	South Korea	†
No Land for the People	Ha Jung-su	South Korea	†
See You Tomorrow	Lee Woo-jung	South Korea	†
Night Market	Kim Tae-yong	South Korea	†
Spring on Campus	Ahn Seung-hyuk	South Korea	†

==== Asian Short Film Competition ====
English title	Director(s)	Production country/countries	
6 to 6	Aditya Assarat	Thailand	††
Bahiya & Mahmoud	Zaid Abu Hamdan	Jordan; United Arab Emirates	
Camels	Park Ji-youn	South Korea	
DIY Encouragement	Kohei Yoshino	Japan	†
Endless Joke	Baik Hyun-jhin	South Korea	
Five Numbers!	Hiroaki Ando	Japan	†
Fly by Night	Son Tae-gyum	South Korea	
I Am Happy	Abinash Bikram Shah	Nepal	†
Raw, Cooked, Burned	Shahram Mokri	Iran	††
Inventing Happy Days	Sandrine Dumas	France	††
Shelter	Ismail Basbeth	Indonesia	†
Starting From A	BW Purba Negara	Indonesia	††
Thieves	Eysham Ali	Singapore	†
Thug Beram	Venkat Amudhan	India	†
The Twin	Gustav Danielsson	Sweden	††

==== Short Film Showcase ====
English title	Director(s)	Production country/countries	
Modern Family	Kim Moon-gyeoung	South Korea	†
Modern Family	Kim Kwang-bin	South Korea	†
Peekaboo	Damien Power	Australia	††

==== Documentary Competition ====
English title	Director(s)	Production country/countries	
Golden Slumbers	Davy Chou	Cambodia; France	†
A Hundred-Year Journey of the Family	Kim Duk-chul	Japan; South Korea	†
Jam Docu KANGJUNG	Directors: Jung Yun-seok; Kim Tae-il; Choi Jin-sung; Choi Ha Dong-ha; Kyung Soon; Yang Dong-gyu; Kwon Hyo; Hong Hyung-sook; Chon Seung-il	South Korea	
Money and Honey	Lee Ching-hui	Taiwan	†
Please Don't Beat Me, Sir!	Shashwati Talukdar; P. Kerim Friedman	India; United States	†
Quarter No. 4/11	Ranu Ghosh	India	†
The Reason Why I Step	Kim Cheol-min	South Korea	†
Sea of Butterfly	Park Bae-il	South Korea	†
Shoji & Takao	Ide Yoko	Japan	†
The Sound of Old Rooms	Sandeep Ray	India; South Korea; United States	†
The Vanishing Spring Light	Xu Yun	China; Canada	†

==== Documentary Showcase ====
English title	Director(s)	Production country/countries	
311	Tatsuya Mori; Takaharu Yasuoka	Japan	†
Ari Ari the Korean Cinema	Heo Chul; Chung Ji-young	South Korea	†
Barzakh	Mantas Kvedaravičius	Finland; Lithuania	
Carte Blanche	Heidi Specogna	Switzerland; Germany	††
Corman's World: Exploits of a Hollywood Rebel	Alex Stapleton	United States	
Crulic: The Path to Beyond	Anca Damian	Romania; Poland	
El Gusto	Safinez Bousbia	Ireland; Algeria; France	†
El Médico - The Cubatón Story	Daniel Fridell	Sweden; Estonia; Finland; Cuba	†
The Golden Age of Korean Cinema & the Legend of Shin Film	Cho Jae-hong	South Korea	†
I Am	Tom Shadyac	United States	††
Indochina, Traces of a Mother	Idrissou Mora-Kpai	France; Benin; Vietnam	†
Jig	Sue Bourne	United Kingdom	
Karla's Arrival	Koen Suidgeest	Spain; Belgium; United States	
Mad As Hell: Peter Finch	Robert de Young	Australia	†
The Mystery of the Lagoons, Andean Fragments	Atahualpa Lichy	Venezuela	
No More Fear	Mourad Ben Cheikh	Tunisia	
Talking Architect	Jeong Jae-eun	South Korea	†
This Is Not a Film	Jafar Panahi; Mojtaba Mirtahmasb	France	
Yoyochu in the Land of the Rising Sex	Masato Ishioka	Japan	
Yulu	Directors: Chen Tao; Chen Zhi-heng; Song Fang; Wang Zi-zhao; Wei Tie; Tan Chui Mui; Jia Zhangke	China	

==== Animation Showcase ====
English title	Director(s)	Production country/countries
The Great Bear	Esben Toft Jacobsen	Denmark
Legend of a Rabbit	Sun Yijun	China
A Letter to Momo	Hiroyuki Okiura	Japan
Tatsumi	Eric Khoo	Singapore

=== Open Cinema ===
English title	Original title	Director(s)	Production country/countries	
The Artist		Michel Hazanavicius	France	
God's Own Child	Deiva Thirumagal	Vijay Amand.L.	India	
Leafie	마당을 나온 암탉; Madangeul Naon Amtak	Oh Sung-yoon	South Korea	
A Monster in Paris	Un monstre à Paris	Bibo Bergeron	France; Belgium	
Punch	완득이; Wan-deuki	Lee Han	South Korea	†
Wunderkinder		Marcus Otto Rosenmull	Germany	

=== Special Program in Focus ===
==== Yonfan, A Touch of Sensuality ====
English title	Director(s)	Production country/countries
A Certain Romance	Yonfan	South Korea
Double Fixation	Yonfan	South Korea
In Between	Yonfan	South Korea
Promising Miss Bowie	Yonfan	South Korea
Bishonen	Yonfan	South Korea
Peony Pavilion	Yonfan	South Korea
Colour Blossoms	Yonfan	South Korea

==== Extreme Portuguese Cinema: Six Auteurs in Focus ====
English title	Director(s)	Production country/countries
Past and Present	Manoel de Oliveira	Portugal
Doomed Love	Manoel de Oliveira	Portugal
Francisca	Manoel de Oliveira	Portugal
Val Abraham	Manoel de Oliveira	Portugal
The Convent	Manoel de Oliveira	Portugal
Blood of My Blood	João Canijo	Portugal
Get a Life	João Canijo	Portugal
In the Darkness of the Night	João Canijo	Portugal
Misbegotten	João Canijo	Portugal
The Phantom	João Pedro Rodrigues	Portugal
To Die Like a Man	João Pedro Rodrigues	Portugal
Perpetual Movements:Cine-Tribute to Carlos Paredes	Edgar Pêra	Portugal
The Baron	Edgar Pêra	Portugal
Our Beloved Month of August	Miguel Gomes	Portugal
The Sword and the Rose	João Nicolau	Portugal

==== Asian Western: Man of the East ====
English title	Director(s)	Production country/countries	
The Rambling Guitarist	Buichi Saitō	Japan	
The Rambler Rides Again	Buichi Saitō	Japan	
Gun in My Hand	Fernando Poe, Jr.	Philippines	
San Bernardo	Fernando Poe, Jr.	Philippines	
Eagle of Wild Field	Im Kwon-taek	South Korea	†
Sholay	Ramesh Sippy	India	
Tears of the Black Tiger	Wisit Sasanatieng	Thailand	
The Good, the Bad, the Weird	Kim Jee-woon	South Korea	
Let the Bullets Fly	Jiang Wen	China; Hong Kong, China	

==== Asian Western: Man of the East ====
English title	Director(s)	Production country/countries	
Snowtown	Justin Kurzel	Australia	
Mad As Hell: Peter Finch	Robert de Young	Australia	†
The Hunter	Daniel Nettheim	Australia	
Taj	Winston Furlong	Australia	††
Red Dog	Kriv Stenders	Australia	
Peekaboo	Damien Power	Australia	††

==== Special Screening ====
English title	Original title	Director(s)	Production country/countries
The 14 Amazons	十四女英豪; Shí Sì Nǚ Yīng Háo	Cheng Gang; Charles Tung	Hong Kong, China
Chingachgook: The Great Snake	Chingachgook, die große Schlange	Richard Groschopp	Germany
The Seventh Bullet	Седьмая пуля Sedmaya pulya	Ali Khamraev	Uzbekistan

=== Midnight Passion ===
English title	Original title	Director(s)	Production country/countries	
The Caller		Matthew Parkhill	Puerto Rico	
The Catechism Cataclysm		Todd Rohal	United States	††
Elite Squad 2: The Enemy Within	Tropa de Elite 2 – O Inimigo Agora é Outro (lit. "Elite Troop 2: It's Another Enemy Now")	José Padilha	Brazil	
Grave Encounters		The Vicious Brothers	Canada	
Hard Romantic-er	ハードロマンチッカー	Gu Su-yeon	Japan	†
The Kick	더 킥 วอนโดนเตะ!!	Prachya Pinkaew	South Korea; Thailand	†
Laddaland	ลัดดาแลนด์	Sophon Sakdaphisit	Thailand	††
The Raid	Serbuan Maut (lit. "The Deadly Raid")	Gareth Evans	Indonesia	
Red State		Kevin Smith	United States	
Smuggler	スマグラー おまえの未来を運べ; Sumagura	Katsuhito Ishii	Japan	
Snowtown		Justin Kurzel	Australia	
The Sorcerer and the White Snake	白蛇傳說之法海; Bái Shé Chuán Shuō Zhī Fǎ Hǎi	Ching Siu-tung	China	
Urban Explorer		Andy Fetscher	Germany	
Vampire		Shunji Iwai	United States; Canada	
The Woman		Lucky McKee	United States	

=== Closing Film ===
English title	Original title	Director(s)	Production country/countries
Chronicle of My Mother	わが母の記; Waga Haha no Ki	Masato Harada	Japan

== Awards ==
- New Currents Award
  - Mourning - Morteza Farshbaf (Iran)
  - Nino - Loy Arcenas (Philippines)
- Flash Forward Award
  - Là-bas: A Criminal Education - Guido Lombardi (Italy)
- Sonje Award
  - See You Tomorrow - Lee Woo-jung (South Korea)
  - Thug Beram - Venkat Amudhan (India)
  - Special Mention: Bugging Heaven; Listen to Her - Oh Hyun-ju (South Korea)
  - Special Mention: DIY Encouragement - Kohei Yoshino (Japan)
- BIFF Mecenat Award
  - Sea of Butterfly - Park Bae-il (South Korea)
  - Shoji & Takao - Ide Yoko (Japan)
- KNN Movie Award
  - Watch Indian Circus - Mangesh Hadawale (India)
- FIPRESCI Award
  - Mourning - Morteza Farshbaf (Iran)
- NETPAC Award
  - The King of Pigs - Yeon Sang-ho (South Korea)
- Busan Cinephile Award
  - The Twin - Gustav Danielsson (Sweden)
- Citizen Reviewers' Award
  - Romance Joe - Lee Kwang-kuk (South Korea)
- DGK Award
  - Director: Yeon Sang-ho (The King of Pigs) (South Korea)
  - Actor: Ha Hyun-kwan (Beautiful Miss Jin) (South Korea)
  - Actress: Han Song-hee, Hwang Jung-min (Jesus Hospital) (South Korea)
- CGV Movie Collage Award
  - The King of Pigs - Yeon Sang-ho (South Korea)
- Asian Filmmaker of the Year
  - Tsui Hark (Hong Kong)
- Korean Cinema Award
  - Julietta Sichel (Czech Republic)
