= 19th Busan International Film Festival =

2014 edition of film festival

2014 Busan International Film Festival
- Opening film: Paradise in Service
- Closing film: Gangster Payday
- Location: Busan Cinema Center
- Founded: 1995
- Hosted by: Ken Watanabe; Moon So-ri
- Festival date: October 2–11, 2014

Busan International Film Festival
- 20th 18th

The 19th Busan International Film Festival was held in South Korea from October 2 to October 11, 2014, and was hosted by Ken Watanabe and Moon So-ri. A total of 312 films from 79 countries were screened with total attendance of 226,473. Hong Kong director Ann Hui receives the Asian Filmmaker of the Year award. The closing film was Gangster Payday.

== Program ==
=== Opening ===
- Paradise in Service - Doze Niu (Taiwan)

=== Gala Presentation ===
- Coming Home - Zhang Yimou (China)
- The President - Mohsen Makhmalbaf (Georgia/France/United Kingdom/Germany)
- Revivre - Im Kwon-taek (South Korea)
- The Golden Era - Ann Hui (China/Hong Kong, China)

=== A Window on Asian Cinema ===
- Dearest - Peter Chan (Hong Kong, China/China)
- Haider - Vishal Bhardwaj (India)
- Song of the Phoenix - Wu Tianming (China)
- Bwaya - Francis Xavier Pasion (Philippines)
- Gentle - Le-Van Kiet (Vietnam/United States)
- The Continent - Han Han (China/Hong Kong, China)
- Suntali - Bhaskar Dhungana (Nepal)
- Sun Station - Saman Salur (Iran)
- Don't Go Breaking My Heart 2 - Johnnie To (Hong Kong, China)
- Fires on the Plain - Shinya Tsukamoto (Japan)
- Over Your Dead Body - Takashi Miike (Japan)
- Flapping in The Middle of Nowhere - Nguyen Hoang Diep (Vietnam/France/Germany/Norway)
- The Furthest End Awaits - Chiang Hsiu-chiung (Japan/Taiwan/Korea)
- So Be It - Kongdej Jaturanrasmee (Thailand)
- Tokyo Tribes - Sion Sono (Japan)
- W - Chonlasit Upanigkit (Thailand)
- Taksu - Kiki Sugino (Japan/Indonesia/Thailand/United States)
- A Corner of Heaven - Zhang Miaoyan (China/France)
- Sharing - Makoto Shinozaki (Japan)
- Second Life of Thieves - Woo Ming Jin (Malaysia/Netherlands/Switzerland)
- The Inseminator - Bui Kim Quy (Vietnam)
- Finding Fanny - Homi Adajania (India)
- Margarita with a Straw - Shonali Bose (India)
- The Monk - The Maw Naing (Myanmar/Czech Republic)
- Trench 143 - Narges Abyar (Iran)
- Black Coal, Thin Ice - Diao Yinan (China/Hong Kong, China)
- Labour of Love - Adityavikram Sengupta (India)
- A Few Cubic Meters of Love - Jamshid Mahmoudi (Iran/Afghanistan)
- Red Amnesia - Wang Xiaoshuai (China)
- Still the Water - Naomi Kawase (Japan)
- Fah-Gam-Toh - Parm Rangsi (Thailand)
- Kabukicho Love Hotel - Ryūichi Hiroki (Japan)
- The Sacred Arrow - Pema Tseden (China)
- The Move - Marat Sarulu (Kyrgyzstan)
- Goli Soda - Vijay Milton (India)
- Our Family - Yuya Ishii (Japan)
- My Man - Kazuyoshi Kumakiri (Japan)
- We Have a Guest - Mohammad Mehdi Asgarpour (Iran)
- Zahir - Sidhartha Siva (Iran)
- Sensitive Floor - Kamal Tabrizi (India)
- Fantasia - Wang Chao (China)
- Partners in Crime - Chang Jung-Chi (Taiwan)
- The Owners - Adilkhan Yerzhanov (Kazakhstan)
- Daughter..Mother.. Daughter - Panahbarkhoda Rezaee (Iran)
- Men Who Save the World - Liew Seng Tat (Malaysia/Netherlands/Germany/France)
- Dukhtar - Afia Nathaniel (Pakistan/United States/Norway)
- The Coffin in the Mountain - Xin Yukun (China)
- Teacher's Diary - Nithiwat Tharathorn (Thailand)
- Taxi and Telephone - Ernest Abdyjaparov (Kyrgyzstan/Germany)
- Tales - Rakhshan Bani-E'temad (Iran)
- Ant Story - Mostofa Sarwar Farooki (Bangladesh)
- Exit - Chienn Hsiang (Taiwan/Hong Kong, China)
- Memories on Stone - Shawkat Amin Korkiv (Kurd/Germany)
- Journey to the West - Tsai Ming-liang (France/Taiwan)
- 2030 - Minh Nguyen-Vo (Vietnam)
- One Summer - Yang Yishu (China)

=== New Currents ===
- Mariquina - Milo Sogueco (Philippines)
- Jalal's Story - Abu Shahed Emon (Bangladesh)
- We Will Be Ok - Baek Jae-ho (South Korea)
- End of Winter - Kim Dae-hwan (South Korea)
- Ghadi - Amin Dora (Lebanon/Qatar)
- Don't Say that Word - Takuma Sato (Japan)
- Nezha - Li Xiaofeng (China)
- What's the Time in Your World? - Safi Yazdanian (Iran)
- (Sex) Appeal - Wang Wei-ming (Taiwan)
- Sunrise - Partho Sen-Gupta (India/France)
- 13 - Hooman Seyedi (Iran)
- The Face of the Ash - Shakhwan Idrees (Iraq)

=== Korean Cinema Today - Panorama ===
- Han River - Lee Moo-young (South Korea)
- Alive - Park Jung-bum (South Korea)
- Thread of Lies - Lee Han (South Korea)
- Venus Talk - Kwon Chil-in (South Korea)
- Haemoo - Shim Sung-bo (South Korea)
- Love Never Fails - Min Byung-hun (South Korea)
- The Pirates - Lee Seok-hoon (South Korea)
- The Admiral: Roaring Currents - Kim Han-min (South Korea)
- The Tenor – Lirico Spinto - Kim Sang-man (South Korea)
- Mother - Bong Joon-ho (South Korea)
- Half - Kim Se-yeon (South Korea)
- Kundo: Age of the Rampant - Yoon Jong-bin (South Korea)
- Hill of Freedom - Hong Sang-soo (South Korea)
- Timing - Min Kyung-jo (South Korea)
- Gyeongju - Zhang Lu (South Korea)
- One on One - Kim Ki-duk (South Korea)
- A Girl at My Door - July Jung (South Korea)
- A Hard Day - Kim Seong-hun (South Korea)
- Daughter - Ku Hye-sun (South Korea)
- The Target - Chang (South Korea)
- The Fatal Encounter - Lee Jae-kyoo (South Korea)

=== Korean Cinema Today - Vision ===
- A Midsummer's Fantasia - Jang Kun-jae (South Korea)
- Socialphobia - Hong Seok-jae (South Korea)
- Set Me Free - Kim Tae-yong (South Korea)
- So Very Very - Park Je-wook (South Korea)
- The Liar - Kim Dong-myung (South Korea)
- Entangled - Lee Don-ku (South Korea)
- Shadow Island - Son Seung-ung (South Korea)
- Wild Flowers - Park Suk-young (South Korea)
- A Matter of Interpretation - Lee Kwang-kuk (South Korea)
- Gifted - Juhn Jai-hong (South Korea)

=== Korean Cinema Retrospective ===
==== Reminiscing the timeless filmmaker, Jung Jin-woo ====
- The MA-NIM - Jung Jin-woo (South Korea)
- Does Cuckoo Cry at Night - Jung Jin-woo (South Korea)
- The Rose That Swallowed Thorn - Jung Jin-woo (South Korea)
- Oyster Village - Jung Jin-woo (South Korea)
- Green Rain - Jung Jin-woo (South Korea)
- The White Crow - Jung Jin-woo (South Korea)
- The Student Boarder - Jung Jin-woo (South Korea)
- Border Line - Jung Jin-woo (South Korea)

==== Archeology of Korea Cinema ====
- Sad Story of Self Supporting Child (aka Sorrow in the Heavens) - Kim Soo-yong (South Korea)

=== World Cinema ===
- The Cut - Fatih Akin (Germany)
- A Pigeon Sat on a Branch Reflecting on Existence - Roy Andersson (Sweden)
- Gurov and Anna - Rafaël Ouellet (Canada)
- Cymbeline - Michael Almereyda (United States)
- The November Man - Roger Donaldson (United States)
- Getúlio - João Jardim (Brazil/Portugal)
- Return to Ithaca - Laurent Cantet (France)
- The Drop - Michaël R. Roskam (United States)
- Kill Me Three Times - Kriv Stenders (Australia)
- Eden - Mia Hansen-Løve (France)
- The Homesman - Tommy Lee Jones (United States)
- Waste Land - Pieter Van Hees (Belgium)
- X+Y - Morgan Matthews (United Kingdom)
- Hungry Hearts - Saverio Costanzo (Italy)
- Manglehorn - David Gordon Green (United States)
- Ciudad Delirio - Chus Gutierrez (Colombia/Spain)
- Black Souls - Francesco Munzi (Italy)
- The Kindergarten Teacher - Nadav Lapid (Israel/France)
- The Absent - Nicolás Pereda (Mexico)
- The Dinner - Ivano De Matteo (Italy)
- Leopardi - Mario Martone (Italy)
- Life of Riley - Alain Resnais (France)
- The Price of Fame - Xavier Beauvois (France/Switzerland/Belgium)
- Pasolini - Abel Ferrara (France/Italy/Belgium)
- Métamorphoses - Christophe Honoré (France)
- The Face of an Angel - Michael Winterbottom (United Kingdom)
- Inferno - Vinko Möderndorfer (Slovenia)
- Queen and Country - John Boorman (United Kingdom/France/Ireland/Romania)
- Misunderstood - Asia Argento (Italy/France)
- Jimmy's Hall - Ken Loach (United Kingdom)
- Alleluia - Fabrice Du Welz (France/Belgium)
- Goodbye to Language - Jean-Luc Godard (France)
- Bridges of Sarajevo - Jean-Luc Godard, Aida Begić, etc. (a total of 13 directors) (France/Bosnia and Herzegovina/Switzerland/Italy/Germany/Portugal)
- These Are the Rules - Ognjen Sviličić (Croatia/France/Serbia/Macedonia)
- Clouds of Sils Maria - Olivier Assayas (France)
- Corn Island - Giorgi Ovashvili (Georgia/Germany/France/Czech Republic/Kazakhstan)
- The Wonders - Alice Rohrwacher (Italy/Germany/Switzerland)
- Leviathan - Andrey Zvyagintsev (Russia)
- Stations of the Cross - Dietrich Brüggemann (Germany)
- The Fool - Yuri Bykov (Russia)
- Behavior - Ernesto Daranas (Cuba)
- Mommy - Xavier Dolan (Canada)
- Timbuktu - Abderrahmane Sissako (France/Mauritania)
- White God - Kornél Mundruczó (Hungary)
- Saint Laurent - Bertrand Bonello (France)
- Jauja - Lisandro Alonso (Argentina/Denmark/Mexico/United States)
- Two Days, One Night - Luc Dardenne, Jean-Pierre Dardenne (Belgium)
- Maps to the Stars - David Cronenberg (Canada)
- Chagall-Malevich - Alexander Mitta (Russia)
- Winter Sleep - Nuri Bilge Ceylan (Turkey/Germany/France)
- The Lamb - Kutluğ Ataman (Turkey/Germany)
- Aloft - Claudia Llosa (Spain/Canada/France)
- Boyhood - Richard Linklater (United States)

=== Flash Forward ===
- Cruel - Eric Cherriere (France)
- Fair Play - Andrea Sedláčková (Czech Republic/Slovak Republic/Germany)
- Aurora - Rodrigo Sepúlveda (Chile)
- Chubby - Bruno Deville (Switzerland/Belgium)
- Sebastian - Carlos Ciurlizza (Peru)
- Next to Her - Asaf Korman (Israel)
- Kafka's The Burrow - Jochen Alexander Freydank (Germany)
- Self Made - Shira Geffen (Israel)
- Gente de bien - Franco Lolli (France/Colombia)
- Love the One You Love - Jenna Cato Bass (South Africa)
- Atlantic - Jan-Willem van Ewijk (Netherlands/Belgium/Germany/Morocco)
- Warsaw 44 - Jan Komasa (Poland)
- Cast No Shadow - Christian Sparkes (Canada)
- Sitting on the Edge of Marlene - Ana Valine (Canada)
- With Child - Titus Heckel (Canada)
- The Boss, Anatomy of a Crime - Sebastián Schindel (Argentina/Venezuela)
- You (Us) Me - Max Sobol (United Kingdom)
- Mr. Kaplan - Álvaro Brechner (Uruguay/Spain/Germany)
- In Silence - Zdeněk Jiráský (Czech Republic/Slovak Republic)
- The High Pressures - Angel Santos (Spain)
- Hammer and Oranges - The Market - Diego Bianchi (Italy)
- Schmitke - Štěpán Altrichter (Germany/Czech Republic)
- The Barber - Basel Owies (United States)
- The Mule - Angus Sampson, Tony Mahony (Australia)
- Rocks in My Pockets - Signe Baumane (United States/Latvia)
- Magical Girl - Carlos Vermut (Spain)
- My Brother's Keeper - Maximilian Leo (Germany)
- Challat of Tunis - Kaouther Ben Hania (Tunisia/France/United Arab Emirates/Canada)
- Hope - Boris Lojkine (France)
- Party Girl - Marie Amachoukeli, Claire Burger, Samuel Theis (France)
- The Tribe - Myroslav Slaboshpytskyi (Ukraine)
- Before I Disappear - Shawn Christensen (United States)
- Natural Sciences - Matias Lucchesi (Argentina/France)
- Lock Charmer - Natalia Smirnoff (Argentina)
- Viktoria - Maya Vitkova (Bulgaria/Romania)

=== Wide Angle ===
==== Korean Short Film Competition ====
- A Familiar Taste - Kim In-seon (South Korea)
- Before the Moving - Kim Rae-won (South Korea)
- Happy Together - Lee Jeong-min (South Korea)
- The Giving-heart - Jung Jae-woong (South Korea)
- The Night - Choi Ki-yun (South Korea)
- The Strait Gate - Son Min-young (South Korea)
- Flayed - Kim Eun-ji (South Korea)
- Working Day - Lee Han-jong (South Korea)
- We'll Live! - Go Sang-hoon (South Korea)
- Cartwheel - Ahn Ju-young (South Korea)
- Visit - Seo Hyung-won (South Korea)
- 19:19 - Lee Yun-mee (South Korea)
- Horn - Byun Sung-bin (South Korea)
- Spring Colds - Kim Dong-ha (South Korea)
- As the Sun Sets - Ko Myoung-sung (South Korea)
- Mrs. Young - Bang Woo-ri (South Korea)
- Hurdle - Bak Sung-jin (South Korea)

==== Asian Short Film Competition ====
- Two Halves of a Truth - Neda Assef (Iran)
- White Sparrow - Dilovar Sultonov (Tajikistan)
- Son - Subarna Thapa (Nepal/France)
- Stairway - Matt Wu (Taiwan)
- Stone Heart - Martika Ramirez Escobar (Philippines)
- That Day of the Month - Jirassaya Wongsutin (Thailand)
- Xing - Liew Bradley (Malaysia)
- The Old Tree - Farnoush Abedirenani (Iran)
- Summer Secret - Zeng Zeng (China)
- Gyges - He Wenchao (China)

==== Short Film Showcase ====
- The Tide Keeper - Alyx Duncan (New Zealand)
- A Rose Reborn - Park Chan-wook (Italy)
- One Armed Man - Tim Guinee (United States)
- Rowboat - CJ Wang Hsi-Chieh (Taiwan)
- The Singers - Nonzee Nimibutr (Thailand)
- Molehill - Joanna Zastróżna (Poland)
- The Bicycle Thief - Min Yong-keun (South Korea)
- True Love Story - Gitanjali Rao (India)
- Cambodia 2099 - Davy Chou (France)
- The Actress - Moon So-ri (South Korea)
- Awaiting - Kang Je-gyu (South Korea)

==== Documentary Competition ====
- Collapse - Mun Jeong-hyun, Lee Won-woo (South Korea)
- A Lullaby Under the Nuclear Sky - Tomoko Kana (Japan)
- Strangers on the Field - Kim Myeong-joon (South Korea)
- The Storm Makers - Guillaume Suon (Cambodia/France)
- Nick and Chai - Cha Escala, Wena Sanchez (Philippines)
- Factory Complex - Im Heung-soon (South Korea)
- The Anxious Day Out - Kim Cheol-min (South Korea)
- The Hospice - Lee Chang-jae (South Korea)
- Our Metropolis - Gautam Sonti, Usha Rao (India)
- Cotton - Hao Zhou (China/France)
- 03-Flats - Lei Yuan Bin (Singapore)

==== Documentary Showcase ====
- The Look of Silence - Joshua Oppenheimer (Denmark)
- Flowers of Taipei - Taiwan New Cinema - Hsieh Chin Lin (Taiwan)
- Garuda Power : The Spirit Within - Bastian Meiresonne (France/Indonesia)
- Fluid Boundaries - Vladimir Todorovic, Mun Jeong-hyun, Daniel Rudi Haryanto (Singapore/Indonesia/Korea)
- Y/our Music - Waraluck Every, David Reeve (Thailand/United Kingdom)
- Foot Prints in the Desert - Balaka Ghosh (India)
- My Fair Wedding - Jang Hee-sun (South Korea)
- The Salt of the Earth - Wim Wenders, Juliano Ribeiro Salgado (Brazil/Italy/France)
- Southeast Asian Cinema - When the Rooster Crows - Leonardo Cinieri Lombroso (Italy/Singapore)
- The Truth Shall Not Sink with Sewol - Lee Sang-ho, Ahn Hae-ryong (South Korea)
- Little Pond in Main Street - Lee Kang-gil (South Korea)
- We Come as Friends - Hubert Sauper (France/Austria)
- Daddy's School - Hassan Solhjou (United Kingdom)
- National Gallery - Frederick Wiseman (France/United States)
- Red Army - Gabe Polsky (United States/Russia)
- Silvered Water, Syria Self-Portrait - Usama Muhammad, Wiam Simav Bedirxan (Syria/France)
- Parallel - Kay Kim (South Korea)
- Concerning Violence - Göran Hugo Olsson (Sweden/Finland/Denmark/United States)
- Is the Man Who Is Tall Happy? - Michel Gondry (France)

==== Cinekids ====
- Song of the Sea - Tomm Moore (Ireland)
- Paper Planes - Robert Connolly (Australia)
- Millionaire Dog - Tom Fernandez (Spain)
- Bamse and the City of Thieves - Christian Ryltenius (Sweden/Taiwan)
- That Boy Emil - Per Åhlin, Alicja Jaworski Bjork, Lasse Persson (Sweden)

=== Open Cinema ===
- The Gate - Régis Wargnier (France/Belgium/Cambodia)
- Therapy for a Vampire - David Ruehm (Austria/Switzerland)
- Five Minutes to Tomorrow - Isao Yukisada (China)
- Cart - Boo Ji-young (South Korea)
- Geronimo - Tony Gatlif (France)
- Brotherhood of Blades - Lu Yang (China)
- Mary Kom - Omung Kumar (India)
- Whiplash - Damien Chazelle (United States)

=== Special Programs in Focus ===
==== New Turkish Cinema: Faces of the 21st Century ====
- The Extremely Tragic Story of Celal Tan and His Family - Onur Ünlü (Turkey)
- Cold - Uğur Yücel (Turkey)
- I am not Him - Tayfun Pirselimoglu (Turkey/Greece/France)
- Mold - Ali Aydın (Turkey/Germany)
- Inside - Zeki Demirkubuz (Turkey)
- Black and White - Ahmet Boyacıoğlu (Turkey)
- Singing Women - Reha Erdem (Turkey)

==== The Power of Georgian Women Filmmakers ====
- Day Is Longer Than Night - Lana Gogoberidze (Georgia)
- Story of Mountainous Racha - Lana Gogoberidze (Georgia)
- Felicita - Salome Alexi (Georgia/Georgia)
- The Lullaby - Nana Janelidze (Georgia)
- Salt White - Keti Machavariani (Georgia)
- Susa - Rusudan Pirveli (Georgia)
- Keep Smiling - Rusudan Chkonia (Georgia/France/Luxembourg)
- Bakhmaro - Salome Jashi (Germany/Georgia)
- The Machine Which Makes Everything Disappear - Tinatin Gurchiani (Georgia/Germany)
- Brother - Teona Mghvdeladze, Thierry Grenade (Georgia/France)
- Brides - Tinatin Kajrishvili (Georgia/France)
- In Bloom - Nana Ekvtimishvili, Simon Gross (Georgia)

=== Midnight Passion ===
- Live TV - Kim Sun-ung, Son Kwang-soo (South Korea)
- The World of Kanako - Tetsuya Nakashima (Japan)
- Nymphomaniac - Lars von Trier (Denmark/Belgium/France/Germany/United Kingdom)
- Exists - Eduardo Sánchez (United States)
- The Incident - Isaac Ezban (Mexico/United States)
- Wyrmwood - Kiah Roache-Turner (Australia)
- It Follows - David Robert Mitchell (United States)
- Hungry Ghost Ritual - Nick Cheung (Malaysia)
- The Canal - Ivan Kavanagh (Ireland/United Kingdom)
- Creep - Patrick Brice (United States)

=== Closing ===
- Gangster Payday - Lee Po-cheung (Hong Kong)

== Awards ==
- New Currents Award
  - End of Winter - Kim Dae-hwan (South Korea)
  - Special Mention : 13 - Hooman Seyedi (Iran)
- BIFF Mecenat Award
  - The Storm Makers - Guillaume Suon (Cambodia)
  - Collapse - Mun Jeong-hyun, Lee Won-woo (South Korea)
- Sonje Award
  - Stairway - Matt Wu (Taiwan)
  - The Night - Choi Ki-yun (South Korea)
- Actor & Actress of the Year Award
  - Choi Woo-shik - Set Me Free (South Korea)
  - Cho Soo-hyang - Wild Flowers (South Korea)
- Daemyung Culture Wave Award
  - The Liar - Kim Dong-myung (South Korea)
- FIPRESCI Award
  - What's the Time in Your World? - Safi Yazdanian (Iran)
- NETPAC Award
  - Socialphobia - Hong Seok-jae (South Korea)
- KNN Award
  - Ghadi - Amin Dora (Lebanon)
- Busan Bank Award
  - The Boss, Anatomy of a Crime - Sebastián Schindel (Argentina)
- Citizen Critics’ Award
  - Set Me Free - Kim Tae-yong (South Korea)
- Busan Cinephile Award
  - The Look of Silence - Joshua Oppenheimer (Denmark)
- CGV Movie Collage Award
  - A Matter of Interpretation - Lee Kwang-kuk (South Korea)
- DGK Award
  - A Midsummer's Fantasia - Jang Kun-jae (South Korea)
  - Socialphobia - Hong Seok-jae (South Korea)
- The Asian Filmmaker of the Year
  - Ann Hui (Hong Kong)
- Korean Cinema Award
  - Corinne Siegrist-Oboussier (Switzerland)
