= 3rd Wildflower Film Awards =

2016 edition of award ceremony

- Date: April 7, 2016
- Site: Literature House, Seoul

The 3rd Wildflower Film Awards (Korean: 들꽃영화상) is an awards ceremony recognizing the achievements of Korean independent and low-budget films. It was held at the Literature House in Seoul on April 7, 2016.

22 films were nominated across 10 categories, each with a budget under ₩1 billion (US$860,000) and released theatrically between January 1 and December 31, 2015.

Best New Actor and Actress categories had been merged, with Best Supporting Performer being included.

== Nominations and winners ==
(Winners denoted in bold)

Grand Prize
**Alive**
Best Director (Narrative Films)	Best Director (Documentaries)
**Shin Su-won** - **Madonna**; Hong Sang-soo - Right Now, Wrong Then; Jang Kun-jae - A Midsummer's Fantasia; Lee Kwang-kuk - A Matter of Interpretation; Park Jung-bum - Alive; Albert Shin - In Her Place; Shin Yeon-shick - The Avian Kind	**E Il-ha** - **A Crybaby Boxing Club**; Gu Ja-hywan - Red Tomb; Im Heung-soon - Factory Complex; Jang Hee-sun - My Fair Wedding; Park Bae-il - Miryang Arirang: Legend of Miryang 2
Best Actor	Best Actress
**Jung Jae-young** - **Right Now, Wrong Then**; Iwase Ryo - A Midsummer's Fantasia; Jang Hyun-sung - Love Never Fails; Lee Joo-seung - Socialphobia; Park Jung-bum - Alive	**Lee Jung-hyun** - **Alice in Earnestland**; Kim Min-hee - Right Now, Wrong Then; Kim Sae-byuk - A Midsummer's Fantasia; Shin Dong-mi - A Matter of Interpretation; Yoon Da-gyeong - In Her Place
Best Screenplay	Best Cinematography
**Shin Yeon-shick** - **The Avian Kind**; Hong Sang-soo - Right Now, Wrong Then; Jang Kun-jae - A Midsummer's Fantasia; Lee Kwang-kuk - A Matter of Interpretation; Park Jung-bum - Alive	**Fujii Masayuki** - **A Midsummer's Fantasia**; Cho Young-jik - Love and...; Im Heung-soon - Factory Complex; Moon Myeong-hwan - In Her Place; Park Bae-il - Miryang Arirang: Legend of Miryang 2
Best New Director (Narrative Films)	Best New Director (Documentaries)
**Hong Seok-jae** - **Socialphobia**; Ahn Gooc-jin - Alice in Earnestland; Baek Jae-ho - We Will Be Ok; Han Ji-won - Clearer Than You Think; Kwon Oh-kwang - Collective Invention	**Gu Ja-hywan** - **Red Tomb**; Kim Cheol-min - The Anxious Day Out; Kim Hyoung-ju - The Basement Satellite
Best New Actor/Actress	Best Supporting Actor/Actress
**Kwon So-hyun** - **Madonna**; Ahn Ji-hye - In Her Place; Jeong Ha-dam - Wild Flowers; Ryu Jun-yeol - Socialphobia; Seong Ho-jun- Pascha	**Gil Hae-yeon** - **In Her Place**; Kang Bong-sung - Wild Flowers; Kim Kang-hyun - A Matter of Interpretation; Lee Paul - Wild Flowers; Yoo Jun-sang - A Matter of Interpretation
Jury Honorable Mention	Special Achievement Award
**Jang Hee-sun** - **My Fair Wedding**	**Gu Yun-hee** - **Scary House**
Appreciation Award	
**Lee Seong-gyou (1963–2013)**	
