= Shin Dong-mi =

South Korean actress (born 1977)

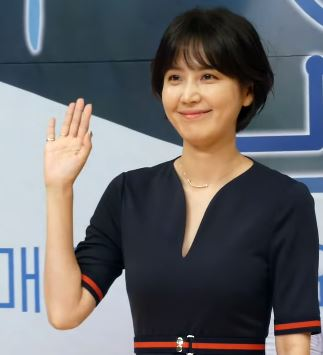
- Shin in July 2019
- Born: September 13, 1977 (age 49); Gapyeong County, Gyeonggi Province, South Korea
- Education: Dankook University (Department of Theater and Film)
- Occupation: Actress
- Years active: 1998–present
- Agent: JUST Entertainment
- Height: 170 cm (5 ft 7 in)
- Spouse: Hur Gyu (m. 2014)

Korean name
- Hangul: 신동미
- RR: Sin Dongmi
- MR: Sin Tongmi
- Website: justent.co.kr

Shin Dong-mi (Korean: 신동미; born September 13, 1977) is a South Korean actress. She made her debut as a theater actor in 1998. She started her career as a television actress in 2001 and later made her film debut in a supporting role in Don't Look Back (2006). She had her first leading role in Lee Kwang-kuk's highly acclaimed debut Romance Joe (2002). She starred as a lead in Lee's second feature A Matter of Interpretation (2015) again and earned acclaim for her calibrated and humorous performance. More recently, she has appeared in drama titles such as Hi Bye, Mama! (2020), Record of Youth (2020), The Good Detective (2020–2022) and Welcome to Samdal-ri (2023–2024).

== Personal life ==
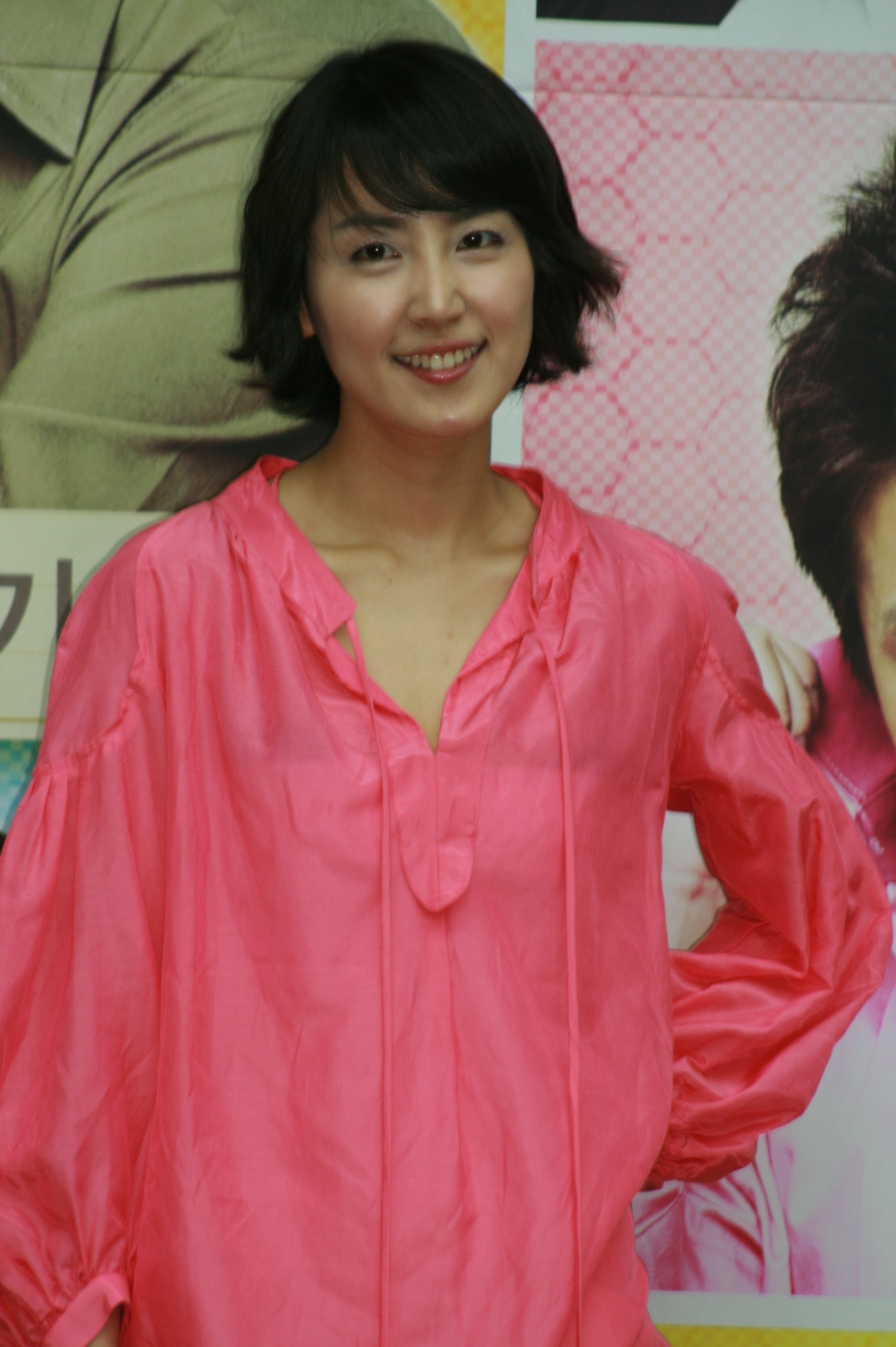
Shin in April 2008

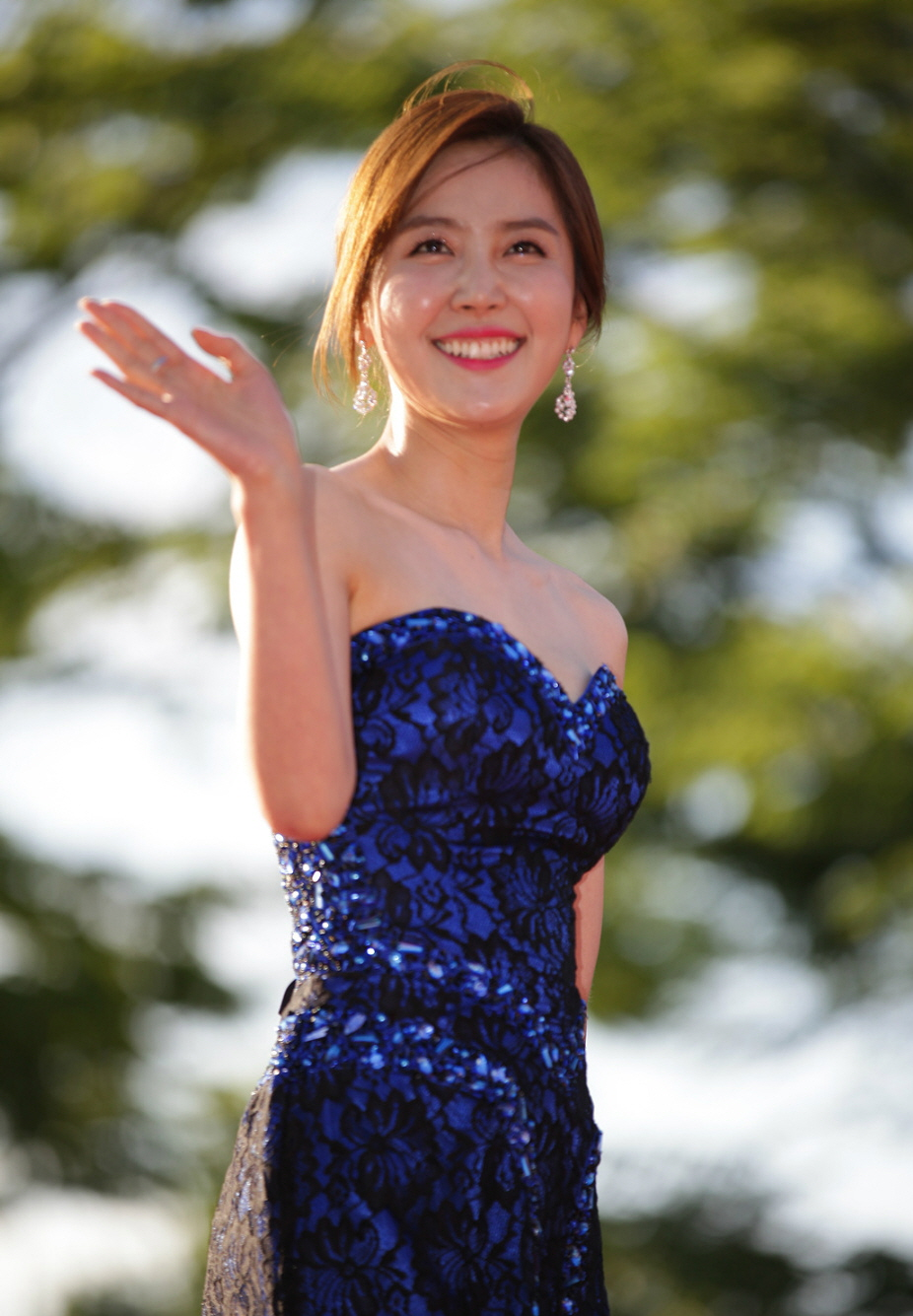
Shin during 2015 Bucheon International Fantastic Film Festival

Shin studied theater in Dankook University. She married musical actor and singer Hur Gyu on December 8, 2014. They have released a song together titled Dream of a Doll and Feel so good and also performed together on Immortal Songs: Singing the Legend.

== Filmography ==
=== Film ===
Key
†	Denotes films that have not yet been released

Film appearances
Year	Title	Role	Ref.
2006	Don't Look Back		
2008	Little Prince	Eun Hee-soo	
2009	A Million	Professor An	
2011	Drifting Away	Mi-seon	
2012	Romance Joe	Teashop girl	
2012	Code Name: Jackal	Seon-young	
2012	Don't Cry Mommy	Ahn Hye-soo	
2013	Novel Meets Movie	Young-seon	
2014	A Hard Day	Ko Gun-su's younger sister	
2014	Santa Barbara	Ho-kyung	
2015	The Beauty Inside	Department head	
2015	Island		
2015	A Matter of Interpretation	Yeon-sin	
2016	Elephant in the Room (segment: "Chicken Game")	Actress	
2016	The Hunt	Moon Jeong-sook	
2016	The Map Against The World	Woman from Yeonju	
2017	The Picture (segment: "Lim Dong-mi")	Kim Mi-seon (Cameo)	
2019	The Package		
2019	A Boy and Sungreen	Bo-Hee's mother	
2019	Sub-zero Wind	Eun-Suk.	
2020	Me and Me	Jeon Ji Hyun.	
2020	Si, Nario	Voice of webtoon team leader	
2020	The Golden Holiday	Mi-Yeon.	

=== Television series ===
Key
†	Denotes television productions that have not yet been released

Television series appearances
Year	Title	Role	Notes	Ref.
2001	The Merchant			
2002	Since We Met			
2002	My Love Patzzi	Noh Ji-young		
2003	Country Princess	In Moon-go		
2003	Something About 1%			
2003	Women Next Door			
2004	Say You Love Me	Nurse		
2004	Tropical Nights in December			
2005	5th Republic	Shim Soo-bong		
2005	Young-jae's Golden Days	Joo Young-joo		
2006	Drama City: "First Love"			
2007	Bad Woman, Good Woman	Jang Ji-seon		
2007	A Happy Woman	Huh Jong-mi		
2007	New Heart	Jo Min-ah		
2007	Drama City: "Mellow Bare-skin in Outskirts"			
2007	Drama City: "When Her Star Shines"			
2008	You Stole My Heart	Jo Min-sun		
2010	Grudge: The Revolt of Gumiho	So-yeon's mother		
2012	Drama Special Series: "Just an Ordinary Love Story"	Kyeong-ja		
2012	Golden Time	Jo Dong-mi		
2012	KBS Drama Special: "Culprit Among Friends"	Seon-joo		
2013	Drama Special Series: "Their Perfect Day"			
2013	Empire of Gold	Choi Jeong-yoon		
2013	Drama Festival: "Haneuljae's Murder"	In-boon		
2014	12 Years Promise	Yeo-ok		
2014	Steal Heart	Hong Gye-sook		
2014	Family Secret	Go Tae-ran		
2015	Divorce Lawyer in Love	Ri Book-nyeo		
2015	Ex-Girlfriends' Club	Kim Soo-kyung		
2015	Warm and Cozy	Special appearance		
2015	Hello Monster	Yang Eun-jung		
2015	She Was Pretty	Cha Joo-young		
2015	The Three Witches	Gong Se-shil		
2016	Cinderella with Four Knights	Park Ok-Seon		
2016	The K2	Kim Dong-mi		
2016	Father, I'll Take Care of You	Kang Hee-sook		
2017	Radiant Office	Jo Seok-kyung's ex-husband's fiancée		
2017	Children of the 20th Century	Choi Jung-eun		
2017	Avengers Social Club	Han Soo-ji		
2019	Liver or Die	Kan Boon-shil		
2019	Doctor John	Chae Eun-jeong		
2020	Hi Bye, Mama!	Go Hyun-jung		
2020	Find Me in Your Memory	Writer Hwang	cameo (episode 11)	
2020	Record of Youth	Lee Min-jae		
2020–2022	The Good Detective	Yoon Sang-mi	Season 1 – Recurring; Season 2 – Cameo	
2021	Bossam: Steal the Fate	Jo Sang-goong		
2021	Drama Stage: "Park Seong Shil's Fourth Industrial Revolution"	Park Sung-Sil		
2022	It's Beautiful Now	Shim Hae-jun		
2022	The Fabulous	CEO Oh		
2023	Joseon Attorney	Lady Hong		
2023–2024	Welcome to Samdal-ri	Jo Jin-dal		
2026	Sold Out on You			
2026	Fifties Professionals †	Kwon Oh-ran		

== Awards and nominations ==
Year	Award	Category	Nominated work	Result
2007	KBS Drama Awards	Excellence Award, Actress in a One-Act/Special/Short Drama	Drama City "When Her Star Shines"	Nominated
2015	MBC Drama Awards	Best Supporting Actress in a Miniseries	She Was Pretty	Nominated
2016	3rd Wildflower Film Awards	Best Actress	A Matter of Interpretation	Nominated
2017	MBC Drama Awards	Golden Acting Award, Actress in a Weekend Drama	Father, I'll Take Care of You	Won
2019	KBS Drama Awards	Best Supporting Actress	Liver or Die	Won
2019	KBS Drama Awards	Netizen Award, Actress	Liver or Die	Nominated
2019	KBS Drama Awards	Best Couple Award with Yoo Jun-sang	Liver or Die	Won
2022	8th APAN Star Awards	Excellence Award, Actress in a Serial Drama	It's Beautiful Now	Nominated
2022	KBS Drama Awards	Best Supporting Actress	It's Beautiful Now	Nominated
2024	60th Baeksang Arts Awards	Best Supporting Actress – Television	Welcome to Samdal-ri	Nominated
