= Gangster Payday =

2014 Hong Kong film by Lee Po-cheung

- Film poster
- Directed by: Lee Po-cheung
- Written by: Lee Po-cheung; Lily He
- Produced by: Shirley Yung
- Starring: Anthony Wong; Charlene Choi; Wong You-nam
- Cinematography: Yuen Chun-Wah
- Edited by: Azrael Chung
- Music by: Mak Chun Hung
- Production companies: Star Alliance Movies (HK) Co Ltd; Sundream Motion Pictures Ltd
- Release dates: 7 October 2014 (Busan); 6 November 2014 (Hong Kong)
- Running time: 97 minutes
- Country: Hong Kong
- Language: Cantonese

Gangster Payday (Chinese: 大茶飯) is a 2014 Hong Kong action comedy drama film directed by Lee Po-cheung. It was the closing film at the 19th Busan International Film Festival. It was released on 6 November.

== Cast ==
- Anthony Wong
- Charlene Choi
- Wong You-nam
- Michael Chan
- Ng Chi-hung
- Philip Keung
- Deep Ng
- Wilson Tsui
- Joe Cheung
- Carrie Ng
- Arthur Wong
- Law Wing-cheung
