= Là-bas: A Criminal Education =

2011 drama film

- Directed by: Guido Lombardi
- Screenplay by: Guido Lombardi
- Produced by: Gaetano Di Vaio; Gianluca Curti; Pietro Pizzimento
- Starring: Abdou Kader Alassane
- Cinematography: Francesca Amitrano
- Edited by: Annalisa Forgione; Beppe Leonetti
- Release date: 2011
- Language: Italian

Là-bas: A Criminal Education (Italian: Là-bas - Educazione criminale) is a 2011 Italian crime drama film written and directed by Guido Lombardi, in his feature film debut.

It premiered at the 68th edition of the Venice Film Festival, in the Venice International Film Critics' Week sidebar, in which it was awarded the Lion of the Future for best debut film. For this film Lombardi was nominated for the David di Donatello for best new director and for the Nastro d'Argento in the same category. The film also won the Flash Forward Audience Award at the 16th Busan International Film Festival.

== Cast ==
- Abdou Kader Alassane as Yussouf
- Moussa Mone as Moses
- Esther Elisha as Suad
- Salvatore Ruocco as Peppe Setola
- Billi Serigne Faye as Germain
- Alassane Doulougou as Idris
- Nelson Iyere as Jackson
