= Lee Joo-seung =

South Korean actor

- 이주승
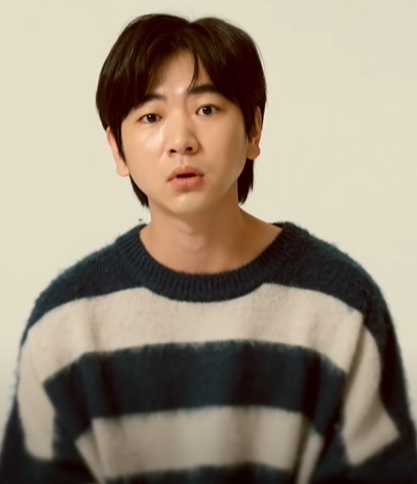
- Lee for Marie Clarie Korea in November 2021
- Born: July 20, 1989 (age 37); Seoul, South Korea
- Education: Seoil University; – Theatre
- Occupation: Actor
- Years active: 2007–present
- Agent: Big Boss Entertainment

Korean name
- Hangul: 이주승
- Hanja: 李柱昇
- RR: I Juseung
- MR: I Chusŭng

Lee Joo-seung (Korean: 이주승, born July 20, 1989) is a South Korean actor. He is best known for starring in independent films, notably Shuttlecock (2014), and drama series such as Pinocchio (2014), The Producers (2015) and Happiness (2021). He is a cast member of the variety show I Live Alone since 2021.

== Early life and education ==
Lee Joo-seung was born on July 20, 1989, in Seoul, South Korea. He studied and graduated from the Department of Theater at the Seoul University.

== Filmography ==
=== Film ===
Year	Title	Role
2008	A Cheonggyecheon Dog	Min-Soo (young)
2009	Members of the Funeral	Noh Hee-Joon
2010	One Night Stand	Young man (segment: "First Night")
2010	A Fever (short film)	Young man
2011	A Confession	Yoon Kyung-Ho
2011	Ordinary Days	Lee Soo-Hyuk (segment: "Distance")
2012	U.F.O.	Jung Soon-Kyu
2013	A Boy's Sister	Jin-Ho
2013	Farewell	Yong-Kyu
2014	Broken	Jo Doo-Shik
2014	Shuttlecock	Baek Min-Jae
2014	Futureless Things	Lee Ji-Yong
2014	Remarkable Woman (web film)	Joo-Seung
2014	Sabra (Short film)	Han Sol
2015	Socialphobia	Yong-Min
2016	Duel: Final Round	Choi Poong-Ho
2016	Graduating Class	Jung-Woo
2022	Unknown World season 1–2 (TVING Short Film)	
2024	Citizen of a Kind	Gyeong-cheol
2024	Dauren's Wedding	
2026	K-Short Drama Awards	

=== Television series ===
Year	Title	Role	Notes/Ref.
2013	KBS Drama Special – "My Friend Is Still Alive"	Chi-hyun	
2013	KBS Drama Special – "Outlasting Happiness"	Dong-soo	
2014	Golden Cross	Oh Chang-hee	
2014	High School King of Savvy	Ji Dae-han	
2014	Prominent Woman	Lee Joo-seung	
2014	Flirty Boy and Girl	Man #4	
2014	Blade Man	Joo Hong-joo	
2014	Pinocchio	Ahn Chan-soo	
2014	Bland You	Sung-tae	
2015	KBS Drama Special – "Let's Stand Still"	Yang Joon-shik	
2015	Let's Eat 2	Lee Joo-seung / Ahn Chan-soo	
2015	The Producers	FD Kim Joon-bae	
2015	The Time We Were Not in Love	Oh Dae-bok	
2015	9 Seconds - Eternal Time	Kang Yoo-chan	
2016	KBS Drama Special – "Explicit Innocence"	Cha Joon-ho	
2017	Voice	Hwang Kyung-il	Season 1; Cameo (episode 4–6)
2017	Distorted	Yoon Sun-woo	
2017	Drama Stage – "Assistant Manager Park's Private Life"	Park Jong-hyuk	
2018	Let's Eat 3	Ahn Chan-soo	Cameo (episode 1)
2019	Doctor Prisoner	Kim Seok-woo	Cameo (episode 3)
2021	Happiness	Andrew	
2023–2024	Like Flowers in Sand	Jo Seok-hee	

=== Web series ===
Year	Title	Role	Notes	Ref.
2018	Top Management	Joo Seung-ri		
2023	Black Knight	Useless		
2026	She Lives Upstairs	Lee Jeong-woo	As director and scriptwriter	

=== Television show ===
Year	Title	Role	Notes	Ref.
2021–present	I Live Alone	Cast member	Episodes 427–present	
2026	Director's Arena	Contestant		

== Theater ==
Year	Title	Role	Ref.
2010	A Nap	Han Young-Jin (young)	
2022	Vincent River	Davy	
2023	Tebas Land	Martin Federico	

== Awards and nominations ==
Year	Award	Category	Nominated work	Result
2013	39th Seoul Independent Film Festival	Independent Star Award	Shuttlecock	Won
2014	23rd Buil Film Awards	Best New Actor	Shuttlecock	Won
2014	13th Mise-en-scène Short Film Festival	Jury's Special Award for the Actor	Sabra	Won
2016	3rd Wildflower Film Awards	Best Actor	Socialphobia	Nominated
2022	2022 MBC Entertainment Awards	Rookie Award in Variety Category	I Live Alone	Nominated
2026	1st Korea Short Drama Awards	Grand Prize	The Killer Woman Upstairs	Won
