= Socialphobia =

- Theatrical release poster
- Hangul: 소셜포비아
- RR: Sosyeolpobia
- MR: Sosyŏlp'obia
- Directed by: Hong Seok-jae
- Written by: Hong Seok-jae; Jo Seul-ye; Kwon O-rang; Koo Sung-mo
- Produced by: Yu Yeong-sik; Choi Equan
- Starring: Byun Yo-han; Lee Joo-seung; Ryu Jun-yeol
- Cinematography: Lee Sung-joong
- Edited by: Park Min-seon
- Music by: Kim Hae-won
- Distributed by: CJ Entertainment
- Release date: March 12, 2015
- Running time: 102 minutes
- Country: South Korea
- Language: Korean
- Box office: US$1.8 million

Socialphobia (Korean: 소셜포비아; RR: Sosyeolpobia) is a 2015 South Korean mystery thriller film starring Byun Yo-han, Lee Joo-seung, and Ryu Jun-yeol. It was co-written and directed by Hong Seok-jae in his directorial debut, based on a real-life story that explores the social issues within internet culture among the Korean youth of the 21st century.

== Plot ==
A group of youngsters investigate a girl who died after being targeted in a witch-hunt on social networking sites, in an attempt to determine whether her death was suicide or murder. A member of the group at first becomes suspect but later the death was proven as a suicide. The film explores internet addiction, cyber bullying, social phobia and lack of morale - self-esteem among youngsters.

== Cast ==
- Byun Yo-han as Ji-woong
- Lee Joo-seung as Yong-min
- Ryu Jun-yeol as Yang-ge
- Ha Yoon-kyung as Ha-young/Re-na
- Yoo Dae-hyeong as Byung-moo
- Park Geun-Rok as Moon-hyuk
- Jung Jae-woo as Gi-seop
- Jeon Shin-hwan as Jang Se-min
- Lee Kang-wook as Hyung-joo
- Byun Jin-soo as Jin-goo
- Oh Hee-joon as Soldier
- Bae Yoo-ram as Jung-bae

== Accolades ==
Year	Award	Category	Recipient	Result
2014	40th Seoul Independent Film Festival	Independent Star Award	Byun Yo-han	Won
2014	19th Busan International Film Festival	NETPAC Award	Socialphobia	Won
2014	19th Busan International Film Festival	DGK Award for Best Director	Hong Seok-jae	Won
2015	51st Paeksang Arts Awards	Best New Director (Film)	Hong Seok-jae	Nominated
2015	51st Paeksang Arts Awards	Best New Actor (Film)	Byun Yo-han	Nominated
2015	24th Buil Film Awards	Best New Director	Hong Seok-jae	Won
2015	24th Buil Film Awards	Best New Actor	Byun Yo-han	Won
2015	36th Blue Dragon Film Awards	Best New Director	Hong Seok-jae	Nominated
2015	36th Blue Dragon Film Awards	Best New Actor	Byun Yo-han	Nominated
2016	3rd Wildflower Film Awards	Best Actor	Lee Joo-seung	Nominated
2016	3rd Wildflower Film Awards	Best New Director (Narrative Films)	Hong Seok-jae	Won
2016	3rd Wildflower Film Awards	Best New Actor	Ryu Jun-yeol	Nominated
2016	21st Chunsa Film Art Awards	Best New Director	Hong Seok-jae	Won
