= Glass Garden =

- International poster
- Hangul: 유리정원
- RR: Yurijeongwon
- MR: Yurijŏngwŏn
- Directed by: Shin Su-won
- Written by: Shin Su-won
- Produced by: Francis Choong-keun Lim
- Starring: Moon Geun-young; Kim Tae-hoon; Seo Tae-hwa; Lim Jung-woon; Park Ji-soo
- Cinematography: Yun Ji-woon
- Music by: Ryu Jae-ah
- Production company: June Film
- Distributed by: Little Big Pictures
- Release dates: October 12, 2017 (BIFF); October 25, 2017 (South Korea)
- Running time: 116 minutes
- Country: South Korea
- Language: Korean
- Box office: US$150,152

Glass Garden (Korean: 유리정원) is a 2017 South Korean mystery drama film directed by Shin Su-won. The film stars Moon Geun-young, Kim Tae-hoon, Seo Tae-hwa, Lim Jung-woon and Park Ji-soo.

== Synopsis ==
Ph.D. student and researcher Jae-yeon has been studying human photosynthesis in the hope that humans could lose their reliance on external air. One day, she retreats to the countryside where she is approached by a novelist who is interested in her research.

== Cast ==
- Moon Geun-young as Jae-yeon
- Kim Tae-hoon as Ji-hoon
- Seo Tae-hwa as Professor Jeong
- Lim Jung-woon
- Park Ji-soo as Soo-hee
- Lee Ki-hyuk as Sung-nae
- Lee Seung-chan as Myeong-ho
- Go Eun-chong as Hyeon-woo
- Lee Gi-hyeok as Seong-nae
- Park Ye-won as Young Jae-yeon
- Song Jae-saeng as Si-eun
- Kim Joong-ki as Biotech chairman

== Release ==
Glass Garden was shown at the opening night of the 22nd Busan International Film Festival on October 12, 2017. It was released in theaters on October 25, 2017.

== Reception ==
The Hollywood Reporter and Variety reviewed the movie, both praising the way the film was shot, with The Hollywood Reporter highlighting the performance of Moon Geun-young.

== Awards and nominations ==
Awards	Category	Recipient	Result	Ref.
38th Fantasporto	Best Screenplay	Shin Su-won	Won	
