= Hong Seok-jae =

South Korean film director and screenwriter

- Born: 1983 (age 42–43); South Korea
- Occupations: Film director; screenwriter

Korean name
- Hangul: 홍석재
- RR: Hong Seokjae
- MR: Hong Sŏkchae

Hong Seok-jae (Korean: 홍석재; born 1983) is a South Korean film director and screenwriter. Hong wrote and directed his thriller feature debut Socialphobia (2015), which won the NETPAC Award and DGK Award for Best Director at the 19th Busan International Film Festival in 2014, and the Best New Director and Best New Actor (for Byun Yo-han) at the 24th Buil Film Awards in 2015. His short film Keep Quiet (2011) won the Special Jury Prize and I love Shorts! Audience Award at the Mise-en-scène Short Film Festival in 2012.

== Filmography ==
- Grandma and Wrestling (short film, 2007) - editor
- 8/10000 (short film, 2008) - assistant director
- Election (short film, 2010) - director, screenwriter, editor
- Keep Quiet (short film), 2011) - director, screenwriter, script editor
- Heart Vibrator (short film, 2012) - actor
- The Phishing (short film, 2012) - assistant director
- LOVE FEE for last month (short film, 2012) - director, screenwriter
- Ingtoogi: The Battle of Internet Trolls (2013) - actor
- Socialphobia (2015) - director, screenwriter

== Awards ==
- 2014 19th Busan International Film Festival: DGK Award for Best Director (Socialphobia)
- 2015 24th Buil Film Awards: Best New Director (Socialphobia)
- 2016 3rd Wildflower Film Awards: Best New Director (Narrative Films) (Socialphobia)
- 2016 21st Chunsa Film Art Awards: Best New Director (Socialphobia)
