= A Tiger in Winter =

- Directed by: Lee Kwang-kuk
- Screenplay by: Lee Kwang-kuk
- Produced by: An Bo-young
- Starring: Lee Jin-wook; Go Hyun-jung
- Cinematography: Kim Hyung-koo
- Edited by: Son Yeon-ji
- Music by: Yeon Ri-mok
- Production company: A Byeokdol Films
- Release dates: October 2017 (BIFF); 12 April 2018 (South Korea)
- Running time: 107 minutes
- Country: South Korea
- Language: Korean

A Tiger in Winter (Korean: 호랑이보다 무서운 겨울손님) is a 2017 South Korean comedy drama film written and directed by Lee Kwang-kuk and starring Lee Jin-wook and Go Hyun-jung. It made its world premiere in the Korean Cinema Today at the 22nd Busan International Film Festival in 2017.

== Plot ==
Gyeong-yu (Lee Jin-wook) has nowhere to stay when his girlfriend asks him to vacate her apartment for a few days while her parents visit. While working as a substitute driver, he meets his ex-girlfriend Yoo-jung (Go Hyun-jung). Can they start over as they face challenges in their lives?

== Cast ==
- Lee Jin-wook as Gyeong-yu
- Go Hyun-jung as Yoo-jung
- Seo Hyun-woo as corrupt
- Ryu Hyun-kyung as Hyeon-ji
- Kim Dae-gon as Fast-food restaurant manager
- Kim Ye-eun as substitute guest
- Moon Chang-gil as middle-aged guest
