= A Midsummer's Fantasia =

- Theatrical poster
- Directed by: Jang Kun-jae
- Written by: Jang Kun-jae
- Produced by: Naomi Kawase; Jang Kun-jae
- Starring: Kim Sae-byuk; Iwase Ryo; Lim Hyung-kook
- Cinematography: Fujii Masayuki
- Edited by: Jang Kun-jae; Lee Yeon-jung
- Music by: Lee Min-whee
- Production company: Mocushura
- Release dates: September 2014 (5th Nara International Film Festival); June 11, 2015 (South Korea)
- Running time: 97 minutes
- Countries: South Korea; Japan
- Languages: Korean; Japanese
- Box office: US$255,211

A Midsummer's Fantasia (Korean: 한여름의 판타지아; RR: Hanyeoreumui pantajia) is a 2014 Korea-Japan co-production film commissioned by the Nara International Film Festival (NIFF). Written and directed by Jang Kun-jae, the film was co-produced with world-renowned filmmaker Naomi Kawase. It made its debut as the opening film of the 5th Nara International Film Festival in September 2014.

== Plot ==
The film is structured into two halves. Part one First Love, Yoshiko, shot in monochrome and documentary-like, deals with a Korean filmmaker researching to shoot a film in Gojo City, Japan. While Part two Well of Sakura, in colour, tells a tale of romance between a Korean actress and a Japanese man from the area inspired by the research from Part one.

== Cast ==
- Kim Sae-byuk as Hye-jeong
- Iwase Ryo
- Lim Hyung-kook

== Production ==
A Midsummer's Fantasia is a film commission for the Nara International Film Festival (NIFF). The NARAtive is a project to make an original film in Nara prefecture, funded by NIFF.

It was shot in Gojo, a small city in the Nara prefecture, for 11 days during a monthlong stay.

== Awards and nominations ==
Year	Award	Category	Recipient	Result
2014	19th Busan International Film Festival	DGK Award	A Midsummer's Fantasia	Won
2015	24th Buil Film Awards	Best New Actress	Kim Sae-byuk	Nominated
2015	35th Korean Association of Film Critics Awards	FIPRESCI Award	A Midsummer's Fantasia	Won
2015	16th Asiatica Film Mediale - Encounters with Asian Cinema	Jury Prize for Best Film	A Midsummer's Fantasia	Won
2015	16th Busan Film Critics Awards	Best Screenplay	Jang Kun-jae	Won
2015	Association of Korean Independent Film & Video	Best Independent Film	A Midsummer's Fantasia	Won
2016	3rd Wildflower Film Awards	Best Director (Narrative Films)	Jang Kun-jae	Nominated
2016	3rd Wildflower Film Awards	Best Actor	Iwase Ryo	Nominated
2016	3rd Wildflower Film Awards	Best Actress	Kim Sae-byuk	Nominated
2016	3rd Wildflower Film Awards	Best Screenplay	Jang Kun-jae	Nominated
2016	3rd Wildflower Film Awards	Best Cinematography	Fujii Masayuki	Won
2016	52nd Baeksang Arts Awards	Best New Actress (Film)	Kim Sae-byuk	Nominated
