= Lee Ki-hyuk =

South Korean actor

- Born: Lee Ki-hyuk; 27 May 1985 (age 41); South Korea
- Other name: Lee Gi-hyeok
- Education: Dongguk University (BA in Theater and Film)
- Occupations: Actor; model; director
- Years active: 2004–present
- Agent: El Julai Entertainment
- Known for: Your Honor; Wok of Love; Sweet Home

Lee Ki-hyuk is a South Korean actor, model and director. He is known for his roles in dramas such as Your Honor, Wok of Love and Sweet Home. He also appeared in movies A Better Tomorrow, Temptation of Wolves and Glass Garden.

== Filmography ==
=== Television series ===
Year	Title	Role	Ref.
2017	Prison Playbook	Junior guard	
2018	Sketch	Lee Jin-yeong's husband	
2018	Your Honor	Choi Min-kook	
2018	Wok of Love	Na Oh-jik	
2019	Confession	Lee Hyun-joon	
2020	Tell Me What You Saw	Won Se-yoon	
2020	She Knows Everything	Lee Myung-won	
2020	Sweet Home	Hwang Seung-jae	
2022	Business Proposal	Jung woo	
2022	Tomorrow	Park Hae-il	

=== Film ===
Year	Title	Role	Ref.
2004	Temptation of Wolves	Hae-won's member	
2010	A Better Tomorrow	Combat police	
2017	Glass Garden	Sung-nae	
2019	Brake	Ha-joon	
2021	Little Bird	Do-yeong	
2022	Mind Universe	Seon-woo	
