= Pluto (2012 film) =

2012 South Korean film by Shin Su-won

- Film poster
- Hangul: 명왕성
- Hanja: 冥王星
- RR: Myeongwangseong
- MR: Myŏngwangsŏng
- Directed by: Shin Su-won
- Written by: Shin Su-won
- Produced by: Shin Sang-han; Francis Lim
- Starring: Lee David; Sung Joon; Kim Kkot-bi
- Cinematography: Yun Ji-woon
- Edited by: Lee Do-hyun
- Music by: Ryu Jae-ah
- Production company: SH Film
- Distributed by: Sidus FNH
- Release dates: October 5, 2012 (Busan International Film Festival); July 11, 2013 (South Korea)
- Running time: 107 minutes
- Country: South Korea
- Language: Korean
- Box office: ₩114,721,500

Pluto (Korean: 명왕성; RR: Myeongwangseong) is a 2012 South Korean film written and directed by Shin Su-won about the severity of competition among students at an elite high school, and how far one will go to be at the top.

The film made its world premiere at the 17th Busan International Film Festival and was also screened at the 63rd Berlin International Film Festival where director Shin Su-won received a special mention in the Generation 14plus Section.

== Plot ==
Kim Joon, a transfer student of a prestigious high school, is arrested for the murder of one of his classmates. Yoo jin, the top student of his class, was found dead in the woods behind the school and strong evidence and a group of students' testimonies point to Joon, but after some questioning with the police, he is released. Upon returning to the school, he holds the group of students as prisoners in a hidden basement. The students are members of an elite group of students, composed of the top 1% of the school who have access to certain privileges that allows them to keep their ranking high. Dark secrets of the group begin to unfold with flashbacks of how Joon, an ambitious student from an ordinary high school who was desperate to become a member, was asked to perform a series of cruel tasks in order to get in.

In the end, the study group known as 'Rabbit Hunt'(토끼사냥)'s cruelty and crimes are exposed, and Kim Joon takes them hostage. Before that, his friend, Sujin, attempted to expose their crime to schoolmates but beaten by them to unconsciousness. While she was hospitalized, her mother discovered a letter in her hand written by Kim Joon - implying his death. At that time, Sujin sheds tear, indicating she comes back to consciousness. Meanwhile, after he turns the evidence of the study group's crime and cruel commitment as stored in USB flash memory drive over to detectives, he gives 1 minute to them to escape the room where he and hostages are in with the other one student. After they escaped, the Total Solar eclipse begins, making the room completely dark for several minutes. During the Totality phase, Joon sets the fuze of his improvised explosive device made with nitroglycerin on fire, killing himself and the study group students as well. After it ends, the total solar eclipse ends as well.

== Cast ==
- Lee David as Kim Joon
- Sung Joon as Yoo-jin Taylor
- Kim Kkot-bi as Jung Soo-jin
- Jo Sung-ha as Chief detective Park
- Kim Kwon as Han Myung-ho
- Sun Joo-ah as Kang Mi-ra
- Nam Tae-boo as Choi Bo-ram
- Ryu Kyung-soo as Park Jung-jae
- Kim Mi-jung as Eun-joo
- Park Tae-sung as Literature teacher
- Gil Hae-yeon as Joon's mother
- Oh Jung-woo as Kang Chang-min
- Hwang Jung-min as Han Myung-ho's mother
- Kim Jae-rok as Principal
- Park Hae-joon as Detective Choi

== Awards and nominations ==
Year	Award	Category	Recipient	Result
2013	63rd Berlin International Film Festival	Special Mention (Youth Jury Generation 14plus)	Pluto	Won
2014	1st Wildflower Film Awards	Best Film	Pluto	Nominated
2014	1st Wildflower Film Awards	Best Director	Shin Su-won	Nominated
2014	1st Wildflower Film Awards	Best Actor	Lee David	Nominated
2014	1st Wildflower Film Awards	Best Cinematography	Yun Ji-woon	Nominated
2014	50th Baeksang Arts Awards	Best New Actress	Sun Joo-ah	Nominated
