= Shin Su-won =

South Korean film director and screenwriter

- Born: 1967 (age 58–59); South Korea
- Education: Seoul National University; Korea National University of Arts
- Occupations: Film director, screenwriter
- Years active: 2002-present

Korean name
- Hangul: 신수원
- Hanja: 申守元
- RR: Sin Suwon
- MR: Sin Suwŏn

Shin Su-won (born 1967) is a South Korean film director and screenwriter. Shin wrote and directed Passerby #3 (2010), Pluto (2013) and Madonna (2015). Her short film Circle Line won the Canal+ Prize for Best Short Film at the 2012 Cannes Film Festival.

== Early life ==
Shin Su-won studied German language education at Seoul National University, and after graduating, she worked as a middle school teacher in Seoul for 10 years, mostly teaching social studies subjects such as geography, world history and political economy. During this time, she also wrote two books focused on teens. Then in 2010, she enrolled at Korea National University of Arts initially because she wanted to become a novelist. But Shin fell in love with the cinema and filmmaking, and changed her major to screenwriting. At the age of 34, she decided to quit her teaching job and become a film director.

== Career ==
Using ₩25 million from her own pension, Shin had begun working on her feature directorial debut since 2007. The self-produced independent film Passerby #3, released in 2010, was derived from her own experiences as a thirty-something woman trying break into the industry and become a filmmaker. Passerby #3 won the JJ-Star Award at the 11th Jeonju International Film Festival and the Best Asian-Middle Eastern Film award at the 23rd Tokyo International Film Festival.

Her next project was the short film Circle Line, which tells the story of a middle-aged man killing time on a Seoul subway train as he tries to keep from his family the fact that he was recently laid off. Circle Line was invited to participate in the 65th Cannes Film Festival and won the Canal+ Prize for best short film. It screened in theaters as part of the four-film omnibus Modern Family.

Pluto, Shin's sophomore feature, was a 2012 thriller that explores the competitive nature of the Korean education system. It premiered at the 17th Busan International Film Festival, and Shin received a special mention at the Generation 14plus Section of the 63rd Berlin International Film Festival.

In 2015, her third feature Madonna, about a nurse's aide trying to secure an organ donation, was invited to screen in the Un Certain Regard section of the 68th Cannes Film Festival. Her next film, Glass Garden, is a mystery drama film, which was released in 2017.

Her fourth feature film, Light for the Youth, is a drama film about the social issues of the youth such as those who are suffering from poor working conditions in South Korea. The film was partly inspired by the news of a 20-year old worker who was hit and killed by a train while working alone to fix a door at Guui station in eastern Seoul. The film's setting is a call center, which was also inspired by an incident in 2017 where a 19-year-old South Korean intern working at a call center committed suicide due to being overworked. Shin shared that working 10 years as a middle school teacher helped her empathize with the younger generation. In 2022, she wrote and directed Hommage, a film about a middle-aged film director who had fallen in a slump due to box office failures and crosses the past and the present after receiving a project to restore a film by a fictional first-generation Korean female director who was active in the 1960s. It was invited to the International Competition section at the 34th Tokyo International Film Festival where it had its world premiere on October 31, 2021. The film also won the Jury Award, the highest award at the 20th Florence Korean Film Festival.

== Filmography ==
- Sweeter Than Candy (short film, 2002) - director, screenwriter
- Shave (short film, 2003) - director, screenwriter, music director
- Home Sweet Home (short film, 2004) - co-screenwriter
- Passerby #3 (2010) - director, screenwriter, producer
- Circle Line (short film, 2012) - director, screenwriter
- Pluto (2013) - director, screenwriter
- Madonna (2015) - director, screenwriter
- Glass Garden (2017) - director, screenwriter
- Light for the Youth' (2020) - director, screenwriter
- Hommage (2022) - director, screenwriter

== Awards ==
- 2010 11th Women in Film Korea Awards: Best Female Director/Screenwriter of the Year (Passerby #3)
- 2012 65th Cannes Film Festival: Canal+ Prize for Best Short Film (Circle Line)
- 2013 63rd Berlin International Film Festival: Special Mention from Youth Jury Generation 14plus (Pluto)
- 2016 3rd Wildflower Film Awards: Best Director (Narrative Films) (Madonna)

=== Honours ===
- Jury member at the 2024 Busan International Film Festival for its competition section 'Kim Jiseok Award'.
