= Romance Joe =

- Film poster
- Hangul: 로맨스 조
- RR: Romaenseu Jo
- MR: Romaensŭ Cho
- Directed by: Lee Kwang-kuk
- Written by: Lee Kwang-kuk
- Produced by: Yim Soon-rye
- Starring: Kim Young-pil; Shin Dong-mi; Lee Chae-eun
- Cinematography: Ji Yun-jeong
- Edited by: Son Yeon-ji
- Music by: Park Jin-seok
- Release dates: October 2011 (BIFF); 8 March 2012 (South Korea)
- Running time: 115 minutes
- Country: South Korea
- Language: Korean

Romance Joe (Korean: 로맨스 조) is a 2011 South Korean comedy drama film written and directed by first-time director Lee Kwang-kuk and stars Kim Young-pil, Shin Dong-mi and Lee Chae-eun. It made its world premiere in the Korean Cinema Today and won the Citizen Critics' Award at the 16th Busan International Film Festival in 2011.

== Plot ==
The story focuses on the plight of a suicidal man.

== Cast ==
- Kim Young-pil as Romance Joe
  - Lee David as young Romance Joe
- Shin Dong-mi as teashop girl
- Lee Chae-eun as Cho-hee
- Jo Han-chul as Director Lee
- Kim Dong-hyeon as Seo-dam/police
- Kim Sae-byuk as nurse

== Awards and nominations ==
| Year | Award | Category | Recipient | Result |
|---|---|---|---|---|
| 2012 | 21st Buil Film Awards | Best New Director | Lee Kwang-kuk | Won |
| 2012 | 16th Busan International Film Festival | Citizen Critics' Award | Romance Joe | Won |
| 2012 | 13th Busan Film Critics Awards | Best Screenplay | Lee Kwang-kuk | Won |
