= A Matter of Interpretation =

- Film poster
- Directed by: Lee Kwang-kuk
- Written by: Lee Kwang-kuk
- Produced by: Lee Kwang-kuk; Do Young-hoon
- Starring: Shin Dong-mi; Yoo Jun-sang; Kim Kang-hyun
- Cinematography: Kang Dae-hui
- Edited by: Son Yeon-ji
- Music by: Jeong Yong-jin
- Production company: Byeokdol Films
- Release dates: 2014 (BIFF); 2 December 2015 (South Korea)
- Running time: 99 minutes
- Country: South Korea
- Language: Korean

A Matter of Interpretation (Korean: 꿈보다 해몽; RR: Kkumboda haemong) is a 2014 South Korean comedy drama film, written and directed by Lee Kwang-kuk.

== Plot ==
Yeon-sin (Shin Dong-mi) is devastated and storms out of the theatre when no one shows up at her play. She calls her boyfriend Woo-yeon (Kim Kang-hyun) and in a fit of anger breaks up with him. She then meets an unorthodox detective (Yoo Jun-sang) with a gift for interpreting dreams.

== Cast ==
- Shin Dong-mi as Yeon-sin
- Yoo Jun-sang as Detective
- Kim Kang-hyun as Woo-yeon
- Lee David as ticket's agent
- Lee Bong-ryun as Landlady

== Awards and nominations ==
| Year | Award | Category | Recipient | Result |
|---|---|---|---|---|
| 2014 | 19th Busan International Film Festival | CGV Movie Collage Award | A Matter of Interpretation | Won |
| 2014 | 40th Seoul Independent Film Festival | Best Film | A Matter of Interpretation | Won |
| 2015 | Vesoul International Film Festival of Asian Cinema | Coup de Coeur Inalco Award | A Matter of Interpretation | Won |
| 2015 | 24th Buil Film Awards | Best Film | A Matter of Interpretation | Nominated |
| 2016 | 3rd Wildflower Film Awards | Best Director (Narrative Films) | Lee Kwang-kuk | Nominated |
| 2016 | 3rd Wildflower Film Awards | Best Actress | Shin Dong-mi | Nominated |
| 2016 | 3rd Wildflower Film Awards | Best Screenplay | Lee Kwang-kuk | Nominated |
| 2016 | 3rd Wildflower Film Awards | Best Supporting Actor | Kim Kang-hyun | Nominated |
| 2016 | 3rd Wildflower Film Awards | Best Supporting Actor | Yoo Jun-sang | Nominated |
