= Lee David =

South Korean actor (born 1994)

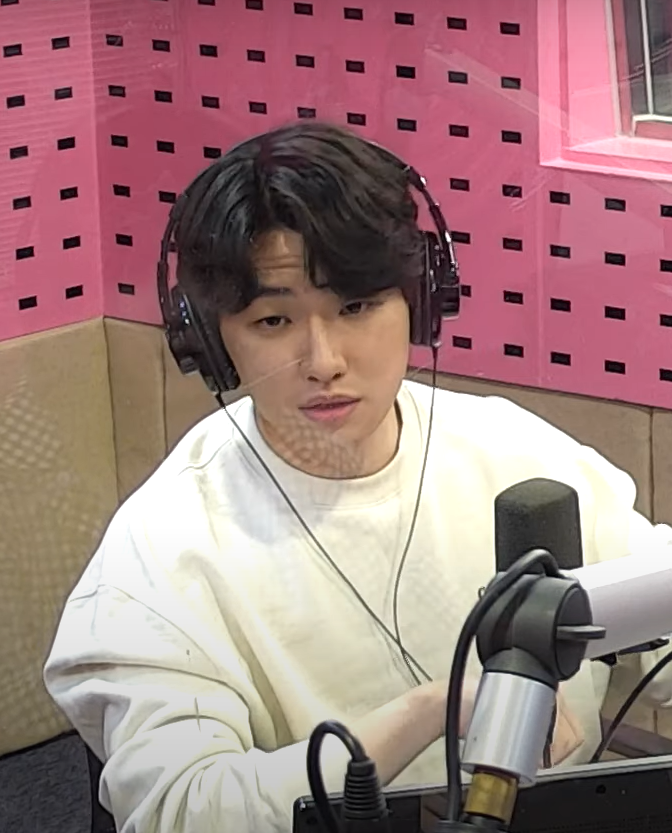
- Lee in 2021
- Born: Lee Da-wit; March 3, 1994 (age 32); Incheon, South Korea
- Occupation: Actor
- Years active: 2005–present
- Agent: SEM Company

Korean name
- Hangul: 이다윗
- Hanja: 李다윗
- RR: I Dawit
- MR: I Tawit

Lee Da-wit (Korean: 이다윗; born March 3, 1994), anglicized as Lee David, is a South Korean actor. He is best known for his supporting roles in Itaewon Class (2020) and Squid Game (2024–2025). He also starred in the films Poetry (2010), The Front Line (2011), Romance Joe (2011) and Pluto (2012).

== Biography ==
Lee Da-wit was born on March 3, 1994 in Gyeyang District, Incheon, South Korea. He enlisted in the military on October 18, 2021, posting a picture on Instagram and was discharged on April 17, 2023.

== Filmography ==
=== Film ===
Year	Title	Role	Notes/Ref.
2002	School Story		
2005	A Stirring Ripple	In-ho	Short film
2006	Platform	Dong-soo	Short film
2006	Mighty Man	Kim Young-kwang	Short film
2006	Head-butt King	Choi Chi-young	
2008	Paradise Murdered	Tae-ki	
2009	Why Did You Come to My House?	young Ji-min	
2009	Infernal Affair	Private	Short film
2010	Poetry	Jong-wook	
2010	Bloody Innocent	16-year-old Seung-ho	Chapter 1, Year 1985
2011	In Love and War	Dong-woo	
2011	The Front Line	Nam Seong-shik	
2011	War of the Arrows	young Choi Nam-yi	Guest role
2012	Romance Joe	young Romance Joe	
2013	Pluto	Kim Joon	
2013	The Terror Live	Park Shin-woo	
2014	Mad Sad Bad	Seung-ho	segment: "Ghost"
2014	Kundo: Age of the Rampant	Jo Seo-in	Guest role
2015	A Matter of Interpretation	Ticket agent	Guest role
2016	Unforgettable	Gae-deok	
2016	Split	Young-hoon	
2017	The Fortress	Chil-bok	
2018	Swing Kids	Kwang-gook	
2019	Svaha: The Sixth Finger	Joseph	
2025	Holy Night: Demon Hunters	Kim Gun	

=== Television series ===
Year	Title	Role	Notes/Ref.
2001	KBS TV Novel: Flower Story		
2002	Magic Kid Masuri		
2003	Age of Warriors	Choe Woo	
2003	The King's Woman	Prince Sunhwa	
2006	Yeon Gaesomun	young Kim Yushin	
2007	Bad Woman, Good Woman		
2007	Lee San, Wind of the Palace	Prince Euneon	
2008	Iljimae	young Cha-dol/Shi-hoo	
2008	My Pitiful Sister	Ji-ho	
2009	Hometown Legends "The Grudge Island"	Seok-yi	
2011	Deep Rooted Tree	Park Se-myung	Guest role
2012	The Great Seer	young Mok Ji-sang	
2013	Gu Family Book	Yoon Jung-yoon	Cameo appearance - Ep. 1
2015	Who Are You: School 2015	Park Min-joon	
2016	Secret Healer	King Myeongjong	
2016	Bring It On, Ghost	In-rang	
2016	Be Positive	Hwang In-guk	Web drama
2017	Save Me	Woo Jung Hoon	
2018	Bad Papa	Kim Yong-dae	
2019	Hotel del Luna	Seol Ji-won	
2020	Itaewon Class	Lee Ho-jin	
2020	SF8	Nam-woo	Episode: "Baby It's Over Outside"
2021	Law School	Seo Ji-ho	
2024–2025	Squid Game	Park Min-su (Participant 125)	In Season 2–3

=== Music video appearances ===
Year	Song title	Artist
2014	"The Story of Our Lives"	g.o.d
2019	"Ballade" (발라드)	ATONE (에이톤)

== Awards and nominations ==
Year	Award	Category	Nominated work	Result
2010	8th Korean Film Awards	Best New Actor	Poetry	Nominated
2011	32nd Blue Dragon Film Awards	Best New Actor	The Front Line	Nominated
2014	1st Wildflower Film Awards	Best Actor	Pluto	Nominated
2018	MBC Drama Awards	Best Supporting Actor in a Monday-Tuesday Miniseries	Bad Papa	Nominated
