= Mise-en-scène Short Film Festival =

- Location: Seoul, South Korea
- Founded: 2002
- Festival date: June 2025
- Language: International
- Website: www.msff.or.kr

The Mise-en-scène Short Film Festival (MSFF) is a Korean short film festival, intended to support upcoming young filmmakers. Since its launch in 2002, it is held every June in Seoul, South Korea.

== Official Program Sections ==
The Mise-en-scène Short Film Festival is organised into various sections:

- Opening Film: Moving Self-Portrait contains video clips shot by the entrants in the Competition in order to introduce themselves.
- Competition: The films are grouped into five genres.
  - A City of Sadness - Comments on Society
  - A Short Film About Love - Focus on Relationship
  - The King of Comedy - From Chaplin to Steven Chow
  - The Extreme Nightmare - World of Horror & Fantasy
  - The 40000 Blows - Action & Thriller on Mean Streets
- Invitation Programs for Domestic Films
- Awarded Films from last year

== Awards ==
=== Grand prize ===
No.	Year	Film	Director
11	2012	Forest	Um Tae-hwa

=== Best Film in A City of Sadness ===
No.	Year	Film	Director
1	2002	Rotation	Noh Jin-sung
2	2003	The End of the Road	Park In-je
3	2004	Feel Good Story	Lee Kyoung-mi
4	2005	Garivegas	Kim Sun-min
5	2006	Illegal Parking	Jeong Chung-hwan
6	2007	One Shiny Day	Yu Young-dae
7	2008	Enemy's Apple	Lee Su-jin
8	2009	Worst Friends	Namkoong Sun
9	2010	Richard, the Elite University Student from London	Lee Yong-seung
10	2011	Social Service Agent	Kim Tae-yong
11	2012	Anesthesia	Kim Souk-young
12	2013	The Way Back	Kim Hal-la
13	2014	The First Grade	Lee Jung-ho
17	2018	The Monologue	Kim Do-young

=== Best Film in A Short Film About Love ===
No.	Year	Film	Director
1	2002	Mario N' Ette	Park Jae-woong
2	2003	Wonderful Day	Kim Hyeon-pil
3	2004	Kite. Flies on the Road	Kim Young-june
4	2005	Getting Married to a Vietnamese Girl	Lee Mi-rang
5	2006	Gahee & B.H.	Shin Dong-seok
6	2007	Twins	Mun Che-yong
7	2008	Solo 36'	Park Bum-soo
8	2009	Empty Lies	Lim Oh-jeong
9	2010	Be with Me	Kang Jin-a
10	2011	Promise	Yang Hyun-ah
11	2012	A Flowers Does Not Wilt, But...	Oh Tae-heon
12	2013	Two Boys and a Sheep	Lee Hyung-suk
13	2014	In the Summer	Son Tae-gyum
17	2018	Passing Over the Hill	Bang Sung-jun

=== Best Film in The King of Comedy ===
No.	Year	Film	Director
1	2002	A Talented Boy Lee Jun-seop	Shin Jane
2	2003	New Asian Superman (episode: Modernization of Fatherland)	Lim Sung-woon
3	2004	Identification of a Man	Yoon Jong-bin
4	2005	My Really Big Mike	Woo Seon-ho
5	2006	Do You Wanna Baby?	Lee Sang-geun
6	2007	Young-gil's Angels	Lee Ho-kyong
7	2008	Shaggy-dog Story	Jeong Seung-koo
8	2009	Stand Up	Park Terry
9	2010	The Brass Quintet	Yoo Dae-eol
10	2011	Chatter	Kim Han-kyul
11	2012	Feeling of Winning	Han Seung-hun
12	2013	A Joyful Gathering Day	Yoon Jae-sang
13	2014	Where is my DVD?	Koo Kyo-hwan
17	2018	Morning of the Dead	Lee Seung-ju

=== Best Film in The Extreme Nightmare ===
No.	Year	Film	Director
1	2002	Adolescence	Je Chang-gyu
2	2003	His Truth Is Marching on	Shin Jane
3	2004	Jul-gui	Park Si-won
4	2005	A Perfect Red Snapper Dish	Na Hong-jin
5	2006	My Small Doll House	Jung Yu-mi
6	2007	The French Lieutenant's Woman	Baek Seung-bin
7	2008	The Dream of Cortazar	Lee Jin-woo
8	2009	Don't Step Out of the House	Jo Sung-hee
9	2010	The Cursed	Huh Jung
10	2011	Ghost	Dahci Ma
11	2012	Forest	Um Tae-hwa
12	2013	Grecoroman	Shin Hyun-tak
13	2014	12th Assistant Deacon	Jang Jae-hyun
17	2018	Hysteria	Jang Man-min

=== Best Film in The 40000 Blows ===
No.	Year	Film	Director
1	2002	Isib-il Segi Sonyeo Dock-bon	Park Kyo-sun
2	2003	Cowardly Vicious	Lee Kwon
3	2004	Memorise of Oldboy	Kim Min-suk
4	2005	Save My Earth	Kim Bejay
5	2006	2Minutes	Jung Tae-kyung
6	2007	Art of War	Kwon Hyeok-jae
7	2008	Cold Blood	Park Mi-hee
8	2009	A Prelude to an Emotional Fight	Shin Jae-young, Kim Dong-hu
9	2010	Last Homecoming	Kim Joon-sung
10	2011	The Hideout	Lee Chang-hee
11	2012	My Fighting Life	Kim Do-kyoung
12	2013	The Line	Kim Soo-jin
13	2014	Greed	Song Woo-jin
14	2015	Janus	Kim Sung Hwan
17	2018	Shadower	Kwak Ki-bong

=== Jury's Special Award ===
No.	Year	Film	Director
5	2006	Illegal Parking	Jung In-gi
7	2008	125 Jeon Seung-chul	Park Jung-bum
7	2008	The Things She Can't Avoid in the City	Park Jee-yeon
8	2009	Alien Blues	Kim Tae-yeoup
8	2009	Dust Kid	Jung Yu-mi
9	2010	C-Kal	Kim Tae-yoon
9	2010	The Key	Kim Hyun-chul
9	2010	The Most Beautiful	Hwang Sang-jun
9	2010	Mr. Tap's Holiday	Lee Sang-geun
10	2011	Dog	Hong Sung-won
10	2011	The Recorder Exam	Kim Bo-ra
11	2012	Keep quiet	Hong Seok-jae
11	2012	Poison Frog	Koh Jung-wook
12	2013	A Room of One’s Own	Yoo Jae-wook
12	2013	The Wish	Huh Jung
13	2014	Hosanna	Na Young-kil
13	2014	A Moral Boy	Kim Do-hoon
13	2014	The World of If	Lim Dae-hyeong
17	2018	A Grand Day Out	An Hyoung-hye
17	2018	New Record	Heo Ji-eun, Lee Kyoung-ho
17	2018	Tail	Kim Hu-jung

=== Jury's Special Award for the Actor ===
No.	Year	Actor/Actress	Film
7	2008		Neighbor
7	2008	Han Ye-ri	Giraffe & Africa
8	2009		Empty Lies
9	2010	Jeong Young-ki	The Key
9	2010		Be with Me
10	2011		Jihye's Fable
10	2011		Paprika Feast
10	2011		The Recorder Exam
11	2012	Min Ho-yul	Min-ho Win!
12	2013	Nam Ho-seop	Squid
12	2013	Lee Sang-hee	Choongshim, Soso
13	2014	Lee Joo-seung	Sabra
13	2014	Park Joo-hee	The girl, The World of If
17	2018	Gang Mal-geum	Passing Over the Hill
17	2018	Lee Won-jong	Tail
17	2018	Shim Dal-gi	Dong-a

=== Mise-en-scène Award ===
No.	Year	Category	Recipient	Film
7	2008	Best Cinematography	Lee Su-jin	Enemy's Apple
8	2009	Best Cinematography		Climatic Change
8	2009	Best Art Direction		Don't Step Out of the House
9	2010	Best Cinematography	Lee Sang-geun	Mr. Tap's Holiday
9	2010	Best Visual Effect	NO.474 (Kim Yong-min, Lee Han-beet, Choi Bong-jun)	Debris
10	2011	Best Art Direction		Paprika Feast
11	2012	Best Film	—	Noodle Fish
12	2013	Best Cinematography	Kim Hyun-guen, Um Tae-sikh	Sign
13	2014	Best Cinematography	Lee Jae-woo	One Day 2014
13	2014	Best Film	—	Mister Lonely
17	2018	Best Editing	Kim Min-ju	KIM Heesun

=== Audience Award ===
No.	Year	Film	Director
7	2008	A Coffee Vending Machine and Its Sword	Chang Hyung-yun
8	2009	Bon Appetit	Kim Eui-suk
9	2010	The Brass Quintet	Yoo Dae-eol
10	2011	A Day	Han Jae-bin
11	2012	Keep quiet	Hong Seok-jae
12	2013	When September Ends	Ko Hyung-dong
13	2014	The First Grade	Lee Jung-ho
17	2018	The Monologue	Kim Do-young

=== Ollehtv Audience Award ===
No.	Year	Film	Director
10	2011	Jihye's Fable	Choi Bon-jun
11	2012	Anesthesia	Kim Souk-young
12	2013	Lie	Jeong Seong-im
13	2014	A Dangerous Woman	Yi Ok-seop

=== Other Awards ===
No.	Year	Category	Film	Director
8	2009	Future Award	Orgel	Chung Da-young
8	2009	Lee Doo-young's Special Award	Thirsty	Ryu Geon-hawn
9	2010	Kim Soo-yong Director's Special Award	Dear Lara	Sin I-su
9	2010	The Best of Moving Self Portrait 2010	Mackerel Go to a Tennis Court	Lim Cheol-bin
9	2010	The Best of Moving Self Portrait 2010	My Mom's Great Kimchi Stew	Han Seung-hun
10	2011	Im Kwon-taek's Director's Special Award	The Driving Lesson	Choi Jai-young
10	2011	Jung Il-sung's Special Award: Best Cinematography	Broken Night	Yang Hyo-joo
12	2013	Park Chan-wook Director's Special Award	When the Moon Is On the Wane	Jung So-young
