= Joanna Zastróżna =

Polish photographer and filmmaker

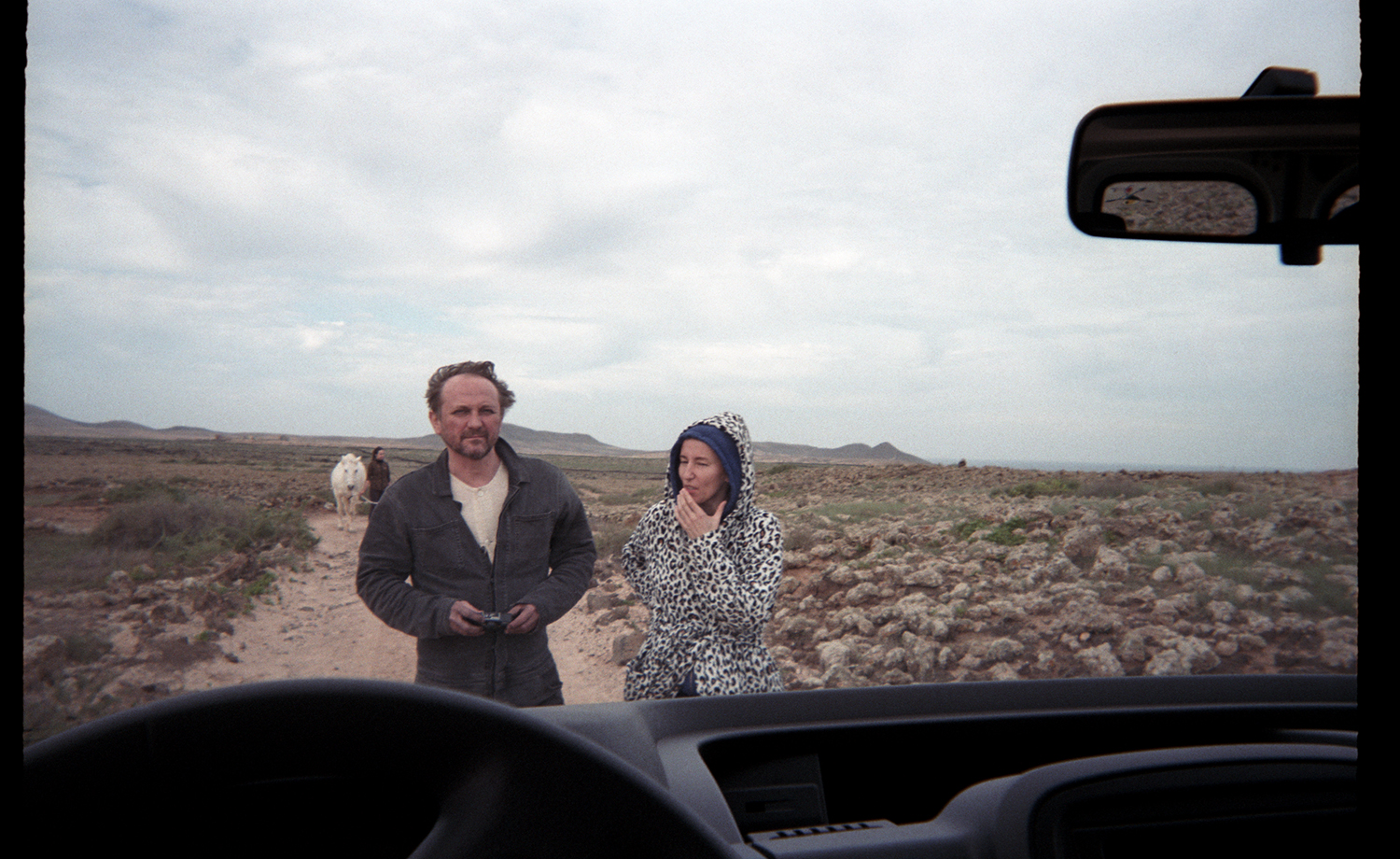
Zastróżna with Andrzej Chyra, film set, film Las, work in progress

Joanna Zastróżna (born 1972) is a Polish photographer and filmmaker. She graduated in 1997 from the Academy of Fine Arts in Gdańsk. Zastróżna resides in Sopot and in Sidi Ifni.

== Life and work ==
Zastróżna was born in Sopot. She started exhibiting in 1999, showing the series "Messenger" which was her graduation project. Two more series, "Condensation" and "Marocco", followed. Her distinctive technique is to paint over negatives, with extensive usage of color. Sometimes she uses negative montage as well. The style has been described as "an ambience of surrealism" and "artificial reality". The subjects are typically human figures, and Zastróżna is not interested in their realistic depiction but rather in psychological analysis.

Zastrozhna participated in a number of major photographical group exhibitions in Poland in the 2000s and the 2010s. Her works are in the collection of The Museum of Art in Łódź.

In 2013, she directed a short film "Molehill". It was presented at the 19th Busan International Film Festival.

== Exhibitions ==
=== Solo exhibitions ===
- Messenger, Mała Galeria ZPAF, CSW Zamek Ujazdowski, Warsaw, Poland (1999)
- Buby, Messenger, Nadbałtyckie Centrum Kultury, Gdańsk, Poland (2000)
- NR2, Replica Art Center, Stockholm, Sweden (2000)
- NR3, Państwowa Galeria Sztuki, Sopot, Poland (2001)
- NR3 Mała Galeria ZPAF, CSW Zamek Ujazdowski, Warsaw, Poland (2001)
- NR3, BWA, Bydgoszcz, Poland (2002)
- NR3, FF Gallery, Łódź, Poland (2002)
- NR3, Leigh on Sea, Art Trail, the UK (2003)
- NR3, Druskininkai, Lithuania (2003)
- NR3, Month of Photography, Kraków, Poland (2003)
- Zagęszczanie, Państwowa Galeria Sztuki, Sopot, Poland (2004)
- Zagęszczanie, Wizytująca Gallery, Warsaw, Poland (2006)
- Zagęszczanie, Photography Museum, Saint Petersburg, Russia (2008)
- MMK, CSW Zamek Ujazdowski, Warsaw, Poland (2010)
- MMK, Państwowa Galeria Sztuki, Sopot, Poland (2011)
- MMK, Centrum Kultury ZAMEK, Galeria PF, Poznań, Poland (2013)

=== Group exhibitions ===
- Jutro jest dziś, Osaka, Nara, and Kyoto, Japan (1999)
- Relacje, House of Photography, Poprad, Slovakia (1999)
- 7th Courant D’Art, Deauville, France (2000)
- Przenikanie, Month of photography, Bratislava, Slovakia (2000)
- Archipelag, Month of photography, Herten, Germany (2001)
- Fotografia polska lat 90. − "Around Decade− Polish Photography of 90’s", Muzeum Sztuki Łodzi; Galeria FF; Galeria Pusta, Katowice; Galeria Bielska BWA, Bielsko-Biała, Poland (2002)
- Cztery Elementy. Ziemia, Galeria DAP OW ZPAP, Warsaw, Poland (2003)
- GlobAll, Woman Kraft Gallery, Tucson, Arizona, USA (2004)
- XX w. w fotografii polskiej, Shoto Museum of Art, Tokyo, Japan (2006)
- Czas Zapamiętany, CSW Zamek Ujazdowski, Warsaw, Poland (2007)
- Forum Fotografii, wystawa na 25lecie Galerii FF, Łódź, Poland (2008)
- Festiwal Sztuki ARTLOOP 00, "Wypas" instalacja, Sopot, Poland (2011)
- Festiwal Sztuki ARTLOOP 02, "Pralnia Chemiczna" instalacja, Sopot, Poland (2013)
