= Gaetano Di Vaio =

Italian film director, screenwriter, and actor (1968–2024)

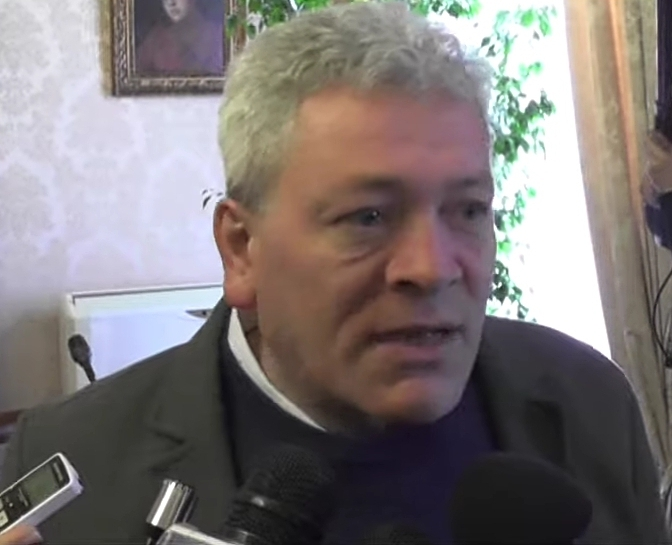
- Di Vaio in 2015
- Born: 27 February 1968; Naples, Italy
- Died: 22 May 2024 (aged 56); Giugliano in Campania, Italy
- Occupations: Film director Screenwriter; Actor

Gaetano Di Vaio (27 February 1968 – 22 May 2024) was an Italian film director, screenwriter, and actor.

== Biography ==
Born in the Piscinola of Naples on 27 February 1968, Di Vaio's family was very poor. His father worked as a caretaker at a school in the outskirts of Naples. Due to his family's economic circumstances, he was forced to live away at a special school, where he suffered from abuse and violence. After leaving school, he turned to a life of drug trafficking and crime, although he never joined the Camorra. He was eventually sent to the Poggioreal Prison, where he stayed until his release in 1998.

In 2001, Di Vaio joined the theatre company founded by Peppe Lanzetta. Afterwards, he founded the cultural association Figli del Bronx, which later became a filmmaking company. In his works, Di Vaio described the problems of the slums and the world of drug trafficking and addiction, focusing on minorities, migrants, youth unemployment, and the fight against crime.

Di Vaio died from injuries he sustained in a scooter accident in Giugliano in Campania on 22 May 2024, aged 56.

== Filmography ==
=== As a director ===
- Il loro Natale (2010)
- Interdizione perpetua (2012)

=== As a producer ===
- Sotto la stessa luna (2005)
- 4-4-2 - Il gioco più bello del mondo (2006)
- Napoli, Napoli, Napoli (2009)
- Vomero Travel (2009)
- Radici (2011)
- Là-bas: A Criminal Education (2011)
- L’uomo con il megafono (2012)
- Take Five (2013)
- Per amor vostro (2015)
- Neapolitan Staycation (2023)

=== Television ===
- Gomorrah (2014)
