= The Sword Identity =

- Directed by: Xu Haofeng
- Starring: Song Yang
- Release dates: September 11, 2011 (Toronto International Film Festival); February 24, 2012 (China)
- Running time: 108 minutes
- Country: China

The Sword Identity is a 2011 Chinese film directed by Xu Haofeng.

== Plot ==
Once upon a time in the Southern Chinese city of Guancheng, there lived four families, each of them faithful keepers of martial arts. Anyone who wanted to establish a new sect, or a new form of kung fu, had to fight his way through the family's gates. But when Liang Henlu requests a competition, he is rejected and driven out of town, his strange new weapon mistaken for a Japanese sword and therefore forbidden by purist Chinese masters as a foreign fighting device. Liang is taken for a Japanese pirate and forced to hide in a boat filled with gypsy dancers. After a series of fights prove Liang's sword invincible, the Guancheng masters start to question their assumptions regarding the weapon's origins. They finally recognize that it is none other than the famous sword called 'Made in China' (modeled on a Japanese weapon), which the celebrated General Qi Jiguang used in his glorious defeat of the Japanese invasion.

== Cast ==
- Song Yang as Liang Henlu
