= Karen Cries on the Bus =

2011 film

- Poster
- Directed by: Gabriel Rojas Vera
- Written by: Gabriel Rojas Vera
- Produced by: Alejandro Prieto
- Starring: Angela Carrizosa
- Cinematography: Manuel Castañeda
- Release dates: 16 February 2011 (Berlin); 28 February 2011 (Colombia)
- Running time: 98 minutes
- Country: Colombia
- Language: Spanish

Karen Cries on the Bus (Spanish: Karen llora en un bus) is a 2011 Colombian drama film written and directed by Gabriel Rojas Vera. It premiered at the Berlin International Film Festival on 16 February 2011.

== Plot ==
Karen, a housewife in her late thirties, leaves her troubled marriage and moves into a cheap room in a crumbling neighborhood where she tries to start a new life. Unskilled, she is unable to find work. Her troubles only increase when her purse is stolen with all her money, forcing her to beg for money at bus stops and shoplift from grocery stores. Her mother and her husband both try to convince her to give the marriage a second chance, but she would rather be on her own.

Karen's new friend Patricia introduces her to a playwright with whom she begins a relationship. Karen is offered a job at a bookstore where she had applied much earlier, but before she can begin work her new boyfriend informs her that he has been offered a job in Argentina and he wants her to join him there. She accepts, and in doing so turns down the job at the bookstore. But before they leave, she realizes that the move would keep her from living her own life as she intended, and she chooses not to go.

The film ends with Karen riding on the bus, still uncertain of the future, but content to finally be living on her own terms. As she gets off the bus, another woman gets on, destitute and crying, just as Karen had done at the start of the film.

== Cast ==
- Angela Carrizosa as Karen
- Juan Manuel Diaz Oroztegui as Eduardo
- Diego Galindo as César
- Angelica Sanchez as Patricia
