= Joan and the Voices =

2011 film

- Directed by: Mikayel Vatinyan
- Written by: Armine Anda; Mikayel Vatinyan
- Produced by: Armine Anda
- Starring: Armine Anda
- Cinematography: Tammam Hamza
- Release date: October 2011 (Busan IFF)
- Running time: 67 minutes
- Country: Armenia
- Language: Armenian

Joan and the Voices (Armenian: Zhannan ev Dzajner) is a 2011 Armenian drama film directed by Mikayel Vatinyan. The film had its world premiere at the 2011 Busan International Film Festival.

== Cast ==
- Armine Anda
- Mikayel Vatinyan
