= Jang Kun-jae =

South Korea film director (born 1977)

- Born: November 26, 1977 (age 48); South Korea
- Education: Korean Academy of Film Arts - cinematography Chung-Ang University
- Occupations: Film director, screenwriter, cinematographer
- Spouse: Kim Woo-ri

Korean name
- Hangul: 장건재
- Hanja: 張建宰
- RR: Jang Geonjae
- MR: Chang Kŏnjae

Jang Kun-jae (born November 26, 1977) is a South Korean film director, screenwriter and cinematographer. Jang debuted with Eighteen (2010) which won the grand prize win as part of the 2009 Vancouver International Film Festival's Dragons and Tigers Award. His second feature Sleepless Night (2013) picked up JJ-Star Award (Grand Prize) and JIFF Audience Award (Korean Film Competition) at the 2012 Jeonju International Film Festival. His third feature A Midsummer's Fantasia (2015) received several nominations, including Best Director (Narrative Films) and Best Screenplay at the 3rd Wildflower Film Awards.

== Personal life ==
Jang studied cinematography at the Korean Academy of Film Arts and received an M.F.A. in Film & Image Production from Chung-Ang University. In 2009, he and producer-cum-wife Kim Woo-ri founded the independent film production company Mocushura and has produced films including Eighteen (2010), Sleepless Night (2013), A Midsummer's Fantasia (2015)., Mom's Song (2020), Vestige (2020) and Juhee From 5 to 7 (2022).

== Filmography ==
- Die Bad (2000) - Actor
- Smoke-flavored Life (short film, 2004) - Still photographer
- Waiting for Young-jae (short film, 2005) - Cinematographer
- Grumpy (2006) - Actor
- Voice of a Murderer (2007) - Actor
- Who's That Knocking at My Door? (2007) - Cinematography department
- Time in Heaven (short film, 2007) - Director
- Eighteen (2010) - Director, executive producer, screenwriter, editor
- Myselves: The Actress No Makeup Project (2012) - Cinematographer
- Sleepless Night (2013) - Director, executive producer, screenwriter, editor, camera operator
- A Midsummer's Fantasia (2015) - Director, producer, screenwriter, editor
- Mom's Song (2020) - Executive producer
- Vestige (2020) - Co-director
- Monstrous (TV Series, 2022) - Director
- Juhee From 5 to 7 (2022) - Director, executive producer, screenwriter, editor, cinematographer
- Because I Hate Korea (2023) – Selected as the opening film at the 28th Busan International Film Festival.

== Awards ==
- 2016 3rd Wildflower Film Awards : Best Cinematography (A Midsummer's Fantasia)
- 2015 Best Korean Independent Film (The Association Korean Independent Film & Video) (A Midsummer's Fantasia)
- 2015 16th Busan Film Critics Awards: Best Screenplay (A Midsummer's Fantasia)
- 2015 16th Asiatica Film Mediale : MIGLIOR Film Award (A Midsummer's Fantasia)
- 2015 35th The Korean Association of Film Critics : FIPRESCI Award (A Midsummer's Fantasia)
- 2015 3rd Muju Film Festival : Jeonbuk Critic Forum Award (A Midsummer's Fantasia)
- 2015 3rd Muju Film Festival : New Vision Award (A Midsummer's Fantasia)
- 2014 40th Seoul Independent Film Festival : Special Mention (A Midsummer's Fantasia)
- 2014 19th Busan International Film Festival : DGK(Directors Guild of Korea) Award (A Midsummer's Fantasia)
- 2012 34th Festival des 3 Continents : Special Mention of Jury (Sleepless Night)
- 2012 66th Edinburgh International Film Festival : The Student Critics Award (Sleepless Night)
- 2012 13th Jeonju International Film Festival : Audience Award (Sleepless Night)
- 2012 13th Jeonju International Film Festival : Grand prize for Korean Film (Sleepless Night)
- 2010 1th Anaheim International Film Festival : Best Feature Film (Eighteen)
- 2010 45th Pesaro International Film Festival : Nouvo Cinema Award (Eighteen)
- 2009 35th Seoul Independent Film Festival : Independent Star Award (Eighteen)
- 2009 28th Vancouver International Film Festival : Dragons & Tigers Award (Eighteen)
