= Frédéric Choffat =

- Born: June 9, 1973 (age 52); Switzerland

Frédéric Choffat (born June 9, 1973) is a French-speaking Swiss director.

== Filmography ==
Year	Film	Length	Note
2011	Mangrove	67 min.	fiction, 35mm / DCP, Les Films du Tigre, co-directed by Julie Gilbert.
2007	Sages Femmes	45 min.	documentary – produit par les films Oeil-Sud.
2006	La vraie vie est ailleurs (Real Life Is Elsewhere)	84 min.	film, Rita Production, Oeil-Sud Films, co-written by Julie Gilbert.
2003	Genève-Marseille	39 min.	fiction Dvcam – les films Oeil-Sud, co-written by Julie Gilbert. Premiere: Locarno 2003, Sélection Officielle internationale vidéo, Festival Rotterdam, Marché du Film Cannes, Trieste, Milan, New-York, Lyon, Soleure
2003	Ocumicho sauvé par les diables	26 min.	co-directed with Julie Gilbert– documentary BetaSP – Oeil-Sud Cinéastes du présent, Locarno, Premier prix du festival du Film scientifique d’Oullins/Lyon, Prix spécial du Jury du festival CNRS du chercheur, Nancy, Bilan du film ethnographique, Paris, Muestra Documentales de América Latina, Grenoble, Soleure, Estonie, Mexico. Ventes TV: Canal 4mas, canal 22 (Mexico)
2000	Monde Provisoire	11 min.	short film – 35 mm co-directed with Julie Gilbert – produit par les films Oeil-Sud. Prix TV5, Cinéma tout écran, Genève - Riga - Trieste - Achat TV5 - Danish TV - Locarno
1998	A Nedjad	15 min.	short film – 35 mm – DAVI / Oeil-Sud. Locarno: Léopard de demain, prix SSR Nouveaux talents suisses. Nomination pour le meilleur court–métrage suisse 99, Prix Trieste pour la Paix 99 – Prime d’étude de l’OFC. Compétition: Locarno – Trieste – Poitiers – Grenoble – Sofia – Kraków – Soleure – Lausanne – Stockholm – London ..., Distribution en France (7 copies). Achat: ARTE – Télévision Suisse Romande – Télévision Suisse Italienne – Télévision danoise – TV Canada – TV australienne...
1997	Beaivi	5 min.	short film – 16 mm N/B – OEil-Sud – co-directed with Christophe Chammartin et Anette Niia compétition: Visions du Réel documentary film festival, Nyon, Switzerland - Soleure - Nordisk Festival Kiruna - Autrans – Split – Soleure ... Achat: Pro Helvetia
1997	La dernière Nuit d’Eva Anderson	9 min.	short film – 16mm – OEil-Sud – co-directed with Christophe Chammartin
1997	Luchando Frijoles	52 min.	co-direction – documentary – Beta SP – DAVI – Festival de Mexico: Prix du meilleur docu d’école & prix de la meilleure réalisation vidéo. Compétition: Locarno – Paris – Lisbonne... Achat: Planète Europe et Planète Afrique – Télévision Suisse Romande – Télévision Suisse Italienne...
