= The Old People =

2011 film

- Directed by: Martín Boulocq
- Written by: Martín Boulocq; Rodrigo Hasbún
- Produced by: Alba Balderrama
- Starring: Roberto Guilhon
- Release date: 2011
- Running time: 80 minutes
- Country: Bolivia
- Language: Spanish

The Old People (Spanish: Los viejos) is a 2011 Bolivian drama film directed by Martín Boulocq.

== Cast ==
- Andrea Camponovo as Ana
- Fabricio Camponovo as Fabricio
- Roberto Guilhon as Tono
- Julio Iglesias as Tio Mario
