= Lee Kwang-kuk =

South Korean filmmaker (born 1975)

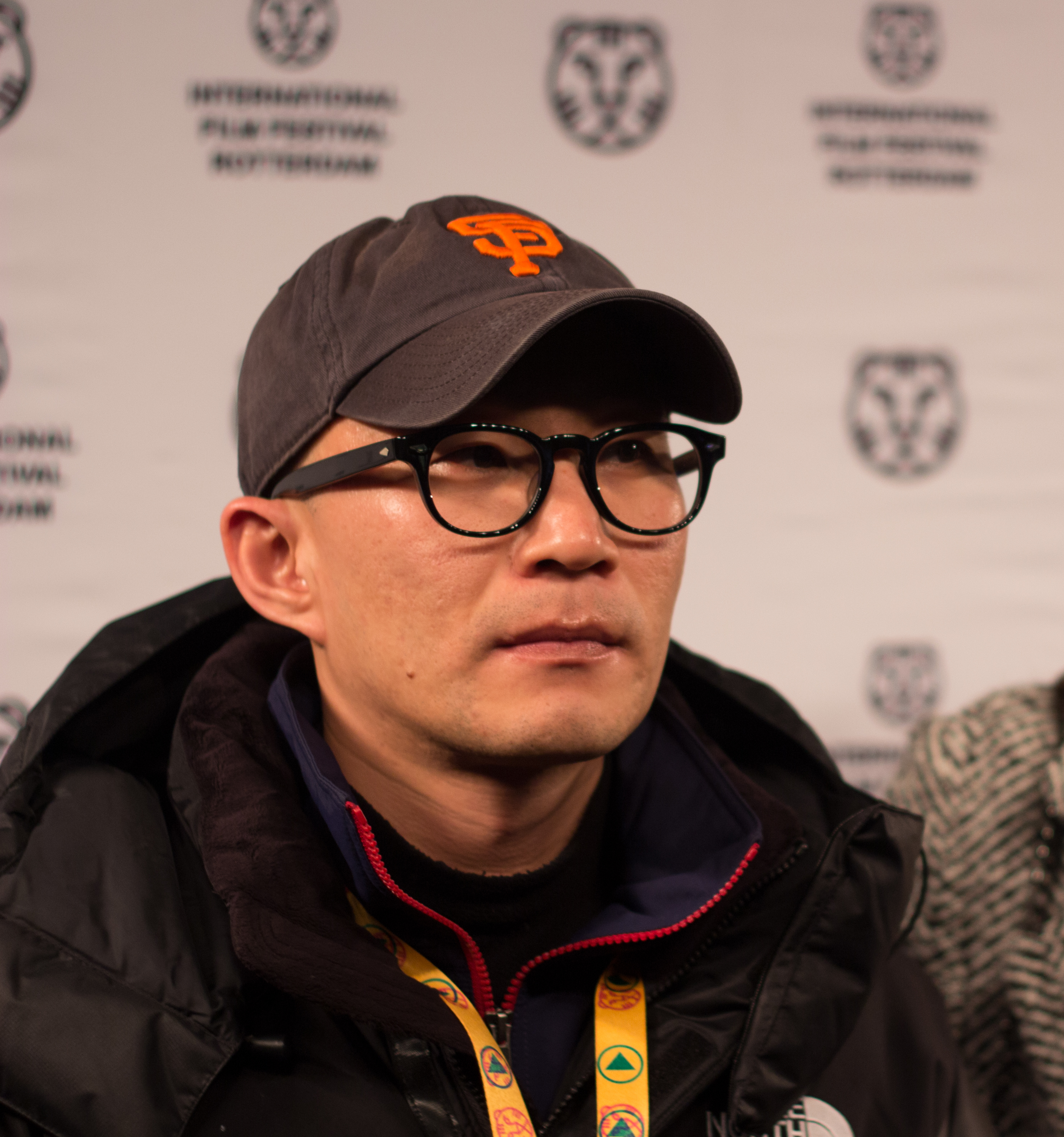
- Born: 1975 (age 50–51); South Korea
- Education: Seoul Institute of the Arts
- Occupations: Film director, screenwriter

Korean name
- Hangul: 이광국
- RR: I Gwangguk
- MR: I Kwangguk

Lee Kwang-kuk (Korean: 이광국; born 1975) is a South Korean film director and screenwriter. An acclaimed indie filmmaker who was a former assistant director to Hong Sang-soo, Lee debuted with Romance Joe (2011), and has since directed another two features A Matter of Interpretation (2014) and A Tiger in Winter (2017).

== Career ==
Born in 1975, Lee graduated with a degree in film from the Seoul Institute of the Arts. He was a former assistant director to Hong Sang-soo before he made his feature debut with Romance Joe (2011) where it made its world premiere and won Citizen Reviewers' Award at the 16th Busan International Film Festival in 2011.

== Filmography ==
- Tale of Cinema (2005) - directing dept
- Woman on the Beach (2006) - assistant director
- Like You Know It All (2009) - assistant director
- Hahaha (2010) - assistant director
- Romance Joe (2011) - director, screenwriter
- Hard to Say (short film, 2013) - director, screenwriter, producer
- A Matter of Interpretation (2014) - director, screenwriter, producer
- If You Were Me (omnibus film, 2016) - director, screenwriter, producer
- A Tiger in Winter (2017) - director, screenwriter, producer
- Beautiful Dreamer (단잠) (2025)

== Awards ==
- 2012 21st Buil Film Awards: Best New Director (Romance Joe)
- 2012 13th Busan Film Critics Awards: Best Screenplay (Romance Joe)
- 2025: CGV Award at the 30th Busan International Film Festival for Beautiful Dreamer.
