= Blue Dragon Film Award for Best Supporting Actress =

Blue Dragon South Korean Film Awards

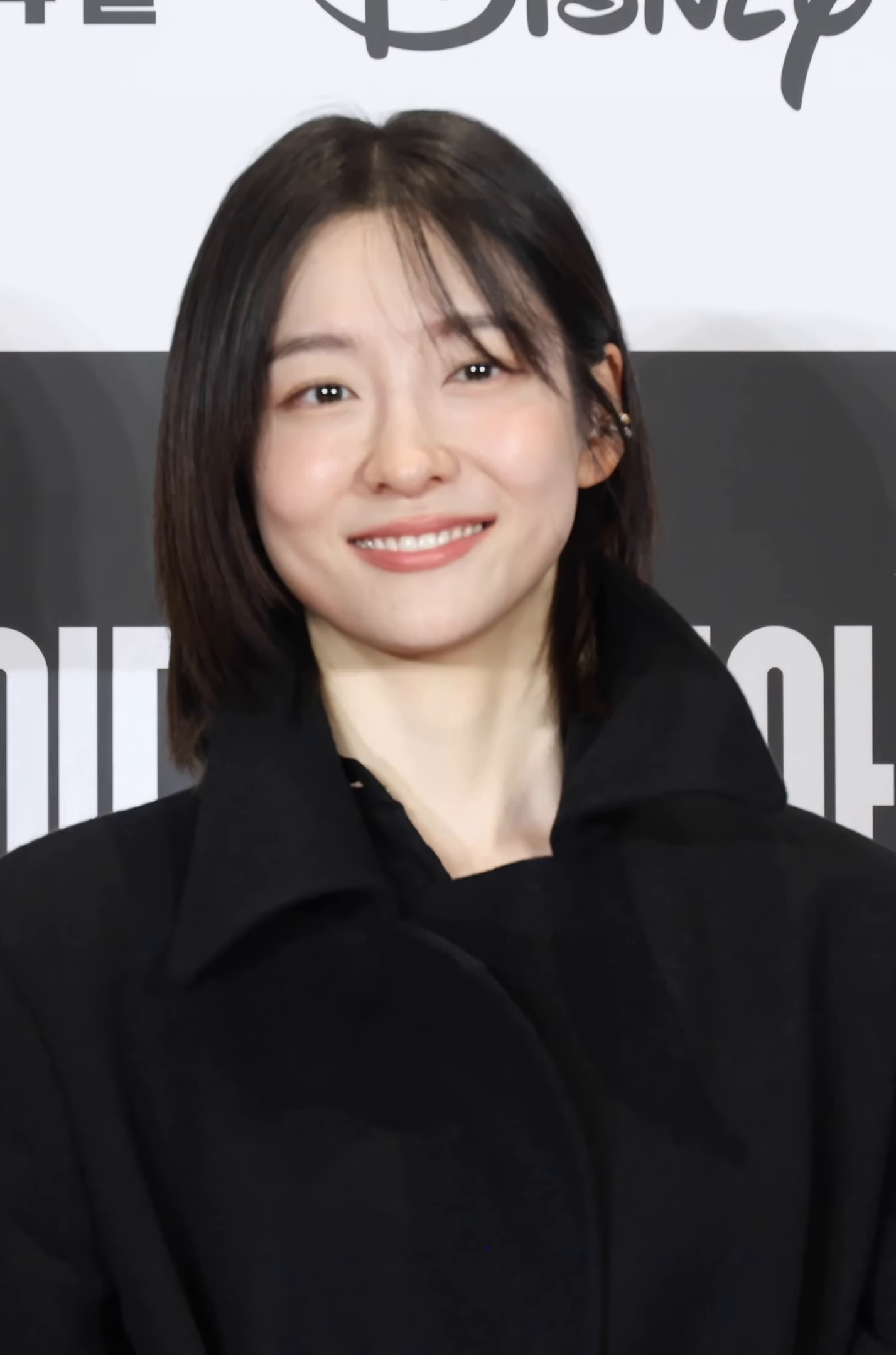
- The 2025 recipient: Park Ji-hyun
- Awarded for: Best Supporting Actress
- Country: South Korea
- Presented by: Blue Dragon Film Awards
- First award: 1963
- Winner: Park Ji-hyun
- Website: blueaward.co.kr

The Blue Dragon Film Award for Best Supporting Actress is one of the awards that is presented annually at the Blue Dragon Film Awards by Sports Chosun, which is typically held at the end of the year.

== Winners and nominees ==
Table key
‡	Indicates the winner

=== 1960s ===
Year	Winner	Film	Original title	Role(s)
1963 (1st)	Choi Ji-hee	The Daughters of Kim's Pharmacy	김약국의 딸들	Yeongnan
1964 (2nd)	Hwang Jung-sun	Extra Human Being	잉여인간	Ms. Kim
1965 (3rd)	Hwang Jung-sun	Madam Wing	날개부인	
1966 (4th)	Jo Mi-ryeong	The Life of Na Woon-gyu	나운규 일생	Ms. Jo
1967 (5th)	Han Eun-jin	Sound of Magpies	까치 소리	Ms. Song
1969 (6th)	Hwang Jung-seun	Women's Quarters	규방	Stepmother

=== 1970s ===
Year	Winner	Film	Original title	Role(s)
1970 (7th)	Sa Mi-ja	What's Parents?	떠나야 할 사람은	Jeombun
1971 (8th)	Jeon Gye-hyeon	Woman of Fire	화녀	Jeongsuk
1972 (9th)	Ahn In-sook	Wolves and Cats	늑대와 고양이들	
1973 (10th)	Choi Jeong-min	Gate of Women	홍살문	Oknyeo

=== 1990s ===
Year	Winner	Film	Original title	Role(s)
1990 (11th)	Son Suk	Only Because You Are a Woman	단지 그대가 여자라는 이유만으로	Lawyer
1990 (11th)	Kim Ae-kyung	Rooster	수탉	
1990 (11th)	Yoo Hye-ri	The Lovers of Woomook-baemi	우묵배미의 사랑	Sae‑daek
1990 (11th)	Lee Hye-young	Nambugun	남부군	Kim Hee-suk
1990 (11th)	Choi Jin-sil	Nambugun	남부군	Park Min‑ja
1991 (12th)	Kim Bo-yeon	Silver Stallion	은마는 오지 않는다	Yong-nyeo
1991 (12th)	Kim Yun-gyeong	Susanne Brink's Arirang	수잔 브링크의 아리랑	
1991 (12th)	Bang Eun-hee	Silver Stallion	은마는 오지 않는다	Soon-deok
1991 (12th)	Bae Jong-ok	Passion Portrait	젊은날의 초상	
1991 (12th)	Ok So-ri	Passion Portrait	젊은날의 초상	
1992 (13th)	Lee Hye-young	Myong-ja Akiko Sonia	명자 아끼꼬 쏘냐	Katsuko
1992 (13th)	Kim Bo-yeon	The Road to Racetrack	경마장 가는 길	
1992 (13th)	Kim Sung-ryung	A Room in the Woods	숲속의 방	Mi Yang
1992 (13th)	Bang Eun-hee	From Barefoot To Benz	발에서 벤츠까지	
1992 (13th)	Song Ok-sook	Walking Up to Heaven	걸어서 하늘까지	
1993 (14th)	Kim Hye-sun	Love Is Oh Yeah!	참견은 노 사랑은 오예	Teacher Choi
1993 (14th)	Kim Keum-yong	The 101st Proposition	백한번째 프로포즈	
1993 (14th)	Lee Hye-young	Passage to Buddha	화엄경	Ma-ni
1993 (14th)	Choi Yu-ra	The Blue in You	그대안의 블루	
1993 (14th)	Ha Yoo-mi	The woman, The man	그여자 그남자	
1994 (15th)	Jung Kyung-soon	The Taebaek Mountains	태백산맥	Sang-jin's Wife
1994 (15th)	Bang Eun-hee	The Fox with Nine Tails	구미호	Agent from Underworld
1994 (15th)	Oh Yeon-soo	The Rules Of The Game	게임의 법칙	Tae-suk
1994 (15th)	Ji Su-won	Two Cops	투캅스	Soo‑won
1994 (15th)	Oh Jung-hae	The Taebaek Mountains	태백산맥	Sohwa
1995 (16th)	Song Ok-sook	A Hot Roof	개같은 날의 오후	Kim Gyeong-suk
1995 (16th)	Kim Bo-yeon	A Hot Roof	개 같은 날의 오후	
1995 (16th)	Uhm Jung-hwa	How to Top My Wife	마누라 죽이기	Kim Hye-ri
1995 (16th)	Ji Su-won	The Hair Dresser	헤어드레서	
1995 (16th)	Jin Hee-kyung	Deep Scratch	손톱	
1996 (17th)	Jo Eun-sook	The Day a Pig Fell into the Well	돼지가 우물에 빠진 날	Min‑jae
1996 (17th)	Moon Soo-jin	Corset	코르셋	Jang Su-in
1996 (17th)	Bang Eun-jin	Farewell My Darling	학생부군신위	
1996 (17th)	Jung Kyung-soon	Festival	축제	
1996 (17th)	Jin Hee-kyung	The Gingko Bed	은행나무 침대	Mi-dan
1997 (18th)	Jung Kyung-soon	Downfall	창	Misuk
1997 (18th)	Park Sang-ah	Ghost Mamma	고스트 맘마	
1997 (18th)	Bang Eun-hee	No. 3	넘버3	Ji-na
1997 (18th)	Jo Eun-sook	Gangster Lessons	깡패수업	Sam-soon
1997 (18th)	Chu Sang-mi	The Contact	접속	Eun-hee
1998 (19th)	Yoo Hye-jung	First Kiss	키스할까요	Kyoung-hee
1998 (19th)	Kim Min	An Affair	정사	Ji‑hyun
1998 (19th)	Park Jin-hee	Whispering Corridors	여고괴담	Park So-young
1998 (19th)	Oh Yeon-soo	The Happenings	기막힌 사내들	Y
1998 (19th)	Yoon Ji-hye	Whispering Corridors	여고괴담	Kim Jung-sook
1999 (20th)	Lee Mi-yeon	The Harmonium in My Memory	내 마음의 풍금	Yang Eun-hee
1999 (20th)	Kim Ha-neul	Doctor K	닥터K	Oh Sae-yeon
1999 (20th)	Song Seon-mi	Tell Me Something	텔 미 썸딩	
1999 (20th)	Yoo Hye-jung	Ghost in Love	자귀모	Baek

=== 2000s ===
Year	Winner	Film	Original title	Role(s)
2000 (21st)	Ha Ji-won	Ditto	동감	Seo Hyeon-ji
2000 (21st)	Kim Sung-nyu	Chunhyang	춘향뎐	Wolmae
2000 (21st)	Kim Yoon-jin	The Legend of Gingko	단적비연수	Yeon
2000 (21st)	Yoon Ji-hye	Plum Blossom	청춘	Jeong Ha-ra
2000 (21st)	Choi Jung-yoon	Nightmare	가위	Seon-ae
2001 (22nd)	Oh Ji-hye	Waikiki Brothers	와이키키 브라더스	In-hee
2001 (22nd)	Gong Hyo-jin	Guns & Talks	킬러들의 수다	Yeo-il
2001 (22nd)	Bang Eun-jin	Address Unknown	수취인불명	Chang-Guk's Mother
2001 (22nd)	Choi Kang-hee	Wanee & Junah	와니와 준하	So-young
2001 (22nd)	Choi Eun-joo	My Wife Is a Gangster	조폭 마누라	Sheri
2002 (23rd)	Song Yun-ah	Jail Breakers	광복절 특사	Han Gyeong-sun
2002 (23rd)	Gong Hyo-jin	Volcano High	화산고	So Yo-seon
2002 (23rd)	Kim Yeo-jin	Chi-hwa-seon	취화선	Jin-jong
2002 (23rd)	Kim Yoo-mi	Phone	폰	Ho-jung
2002 (23rd)	Park Sun-young	Addicted	중독	He-jin
2003 (24th)	Kang Hye-jung	Oldboy	올드보이	Mi-do
2003 (24th)	Gong Hyo-jin	Conduct Zero	품행제로	Na-young
2003 (24th)	Kim Hye-na	Into the Mirror	거울 속으로	Lee Ji-hyun
2003 (24th)	Yum Jung-ah	A Tale of Two Sisters	장화, 홍련	Heo Eun-joo
2003 (24th)	Jeon Mi-seon	Memories of Murder	살인의 추억	Kwok Seol‑yung
2004 (25th)	Yum Jung-ah	The Big Swindle	범죄의 재구성	Seo In-kyeong
2004 (25th)	Go Doo-shim	My Mother, the Mermaid	인어 공주	Yeon‑soon
2004 (25th)	Kim Hae-sook	My Brother	우리 형	their mother
2004 (25th)	Uhm Ji-won	The Scarlet Letter	주홍글씨	Su‑hyeon
2004 (25th)	Chu Sang-mi	Everybody Has Secrets	누구나 비밀은 있다	Han Ji-yeong
2005 (26th)	Kang Hye-jung	Welcome to Dongmakgol	웰컴 투 동막골	Yeo-il
2005 (26th)	Kim Eul-dong	Mapado	마파도	Mrs. Yeo‑su
2005 (26th)	Kim Soo-mi	Mapado	마파도	Mrs. Jin‑an
2005 (26th)	Na Moon-hee	You Are My Sunshine	너는 내 운명	Seok-joong's mother
2005 (26th)	Seo Young-hee	All for Love	내 생애 가장 아름다운 일주일	Ha Seon-ae
2006 (27th)	Jung Yu-mi	Family Ties	가족의 탄생	Chae-hyun
2006 (27th)	Bae Doona	The Host	괴물	Park Nam-joo
2006 (27th)	Kang Sung-yeon	King and the Clown	왕의 남자	Jang Nok-su
2006 (27th)	Uhm Ji-won	Traces of Love	가을로	Yoon Se-jin
2006 (27th)	Yoon Ji-hye	No Mercy for the Rude	예의없는 것들	Her
2007 (28th)	Na Moon-hee	Cruel Winter Blues	열혈남아	Kim Jeom‑sim
2007 (28th)	Im Jung-eun	Shadows in the Palace	궁녀	Ok-jin
2007 (28th)	Park Si-yeon	A Love	사랑	Mi-ju
2007 (28th)	Park Sol-mi	Paradise Murdered	극락도 살인사건	Jang Gwi‑nam
2007 (28th)	Yoo Sun	Black House	검은 집	Shin Yi-hwa
2008 (29th)	Kim Ji-young	Forever the Moment	우리 생애 최고의 순간	Song Jeong-ran
2008 (29th)	Kim Hae-sook	Open City	무방비 도시	Kang Man-ok
2008 (29th)	Kim Mi-sook	Seven Days	세븐 데이즈	Han Sook-hee
2008 (29th)	Park Si-yeon	Dachimawa Lee	다찌마와 리: 악인이여 지	Ma-ri
2008 (29th)	Seo Young-hee	The Chaser	추격자	Kim Mi-jin
2009 (30th)	Kim Hae-sook	Thirst	박쥐	Lady Ra
2009 (30th)	Choo Ja-hyun	Portrait of a Beauty	미인도	Seol-hwa
2009 (30th)	Jang Young-nam	My Girlfriend Is an Agent	7급 공무원	Team leader Hong
2009 (30th)	Kim Bo-yeon	Possessed	불신지옥	Mother
2009 (30th)	Kim Young-ae	Goodbye Mom	애자	Young-hee

=== 2010s ===
Year	Winner	Film	Original title	Role(s)
2010 (31st)	Youn Yuh-jung	The Housemaid	하녀	Byeong-sik
2010 (31st)	Kang Ye-won	Harmony	하모니	Kang Yu-mi
2010 (31st)	Na Moon-hee	Harmony	하모니	Kim Moon-ok
2010 (31st)	Ryu Hyun-kyung	The Servant	방자전	Hyang-dan
2010 (31st)	Yoo Sun	Moss	이끼	Lee Yeong-ji
2011 (32nd)	Kim Soo-mi	Late Blossom	그대를 사랑합니다	Jo Soon-yi
2011 (32nd)	Chun Woo-hee	Sunny	써니	Sang-mi
2011 (32nd)	Jang Young-nam	Hello Ghost	헬로우 고스트	Crying Ghost
2011 (32nd)	Ryu Hyun-kyung	Petty Romance	쩨쩨한 로맨스	Ma Kyun-sung
2011 (32nd)	Yoo Sun	Glove	글러브	Na Joo-won
2012 (33rd)	Moon Jeong-hee	Deranged	연가시	Gyung-seon
2012 (33rd)	Jang Young-nam	The Neighbor	이웃사람	Ha Tae-seon
2012 (33rd)	Kim Hae-sook	The Thieves	도둑들	Chewing Gum
2012 (33rd)	Park Hyo-joo	Punch	완득이	Lee Ho-jeong
2012 (33rd)	Ra Mi-ran	Dancing Queen	댄싱퀸	Myung-ae
2013 (34th)	Ra Mi-ran	Hope	소원	Young-seok's mother
2013 (34th)	Go Ah-sung	Snowpiercer	설국열차	Yona
2013 (34th)	Jang Young-nam	A Werewolf Boy	늑대소년	Sun-yi's mother
2013 (34th)	Jeon Mi-seon	Hide and Seek	숨바꼭질	Min-ji
2013 (34th)	Kim Hye-soo	The Face Reader	관상	Yeon-hong
2014 (35th)	Kim Young-ae	The Attorney	변호인	Choi Soon-ae
2014 (35th)	Han Ye-ri	Haemoo	해무	Hong-mae
2014 (35th)	Jo Yeo-jeong	Obsessed	인간중독	Lee Sook-jin
2014 (35th)	Lee Hanee	Tazza: The Hidden Card	타짜: 신의 손	President Woo
2014 (35th)	Ra Mi-ran	My Love, My Bride	나의 사랑 나의 신부	Madam
2015 (36th)	Jeon Hye-jin	The Throne	사도	Consort Yeong
2015 (36th)	Jang Young-nam	The Classified File	극비수사	Eun-joo's aunt
2015 (36th)	Jin Kyung	Veteran	베테랑	Joo-yeon
2015 (36th)	Moon Jeong-hee	Cart	카트	Hye-mi
2015 (36th)	Ra Mi-ran	Ode to My Father	국제시장	Deok-soo's paternal aunt
2016 (37th)	Park So-dam	The Priests	검은 사제들	Young-shin
2016 (37th)	Bae Doona	The Tunnel	터널	Se-hyun
2016 (37th)	Chun Woo-hee	The Wailing	곡성	Moo-myung
2016 (37th)	Jung Yu-mi	Train to Busan	부산행	Seong-kyeong
2016 (37th)	Ra Mi-ran	The Last Princess	덕혜옹주	Bok-soon
2017 (38th)	Kim So-jin	The King	더 킹	Ahn Hee-yeon
2017 (38th)	Jeon Hye-jin	The Merciless	불한당: 나쁜 놈들의 세상	Chun In-sook
2017 (38th)	Kim Hae-sook	New Trial	재심	Soon-im
2017 (38th)	Lee Jung-hyun	The Battleship Island	군함도	Oh Mal-nyeon
2017 (38th)	Yeom Hye-ran	I Can Speak	아이 캔 스피크	Woman from Jinju
2018 (39th)	Kim Hyang-gi	Along with the Gods: The Two Worlds	신과함께: 죄와 벌	Lee Deok-choon
2018 (39th)	Jin Seo-yeon	Believer	독전	Bo-ryeong
2018 (39th)	Lee Joo-young	Believer	독전	Joo-yeong
2018 (39th)	Kim Sun-young	Herstory	허스토리	President Shin
2018 (39th)	Kwon So-hyun	Miss Baek	미쓰백	Joo Mi-kyung
2019 (40th)	Lee Jung-eun	Parasite	기생충	Gook Moon-gwang
2019 (40th)	Kim Sae-byuk	House of Hummingbird	벌새	Yong-ji
2019 (40th)	Park So-dam	Parasite	기생충	Kim Ki-jeong
2019 (40th)	Lee Hanee	Extreme Job	극한직업	Detective Jang
2019 (40th)	Jang Young-nam	Metamorphosis	변신	Myung-joo

=== 2020s ===
Year	Winner	Film	Original title	Role(s)
2020 (41st)	Esom	Samjin Company English Class	삼진그룹 영어토익반	Jung Yoo-na
2020 (41st)	Kim Mi-kyung	Kim Ji-young: Born 1982	82년생 김지영	Mi-sook
2020 (41st)	Park Hye-su	Samjin Company English Class	삼진그룹 영어토익반	Shim Bo-ram
2020 (41st)	Bae Jong-ok	Innocence	결백	Chae Hwa-ja
2020 (41st)	Lee Re	Peninsula	반도	Jooni
2021 (42nd)	Kim Sun-young	Three Sisters	세 자매	Hee-sook
2021 (42nd)	Jang Yoon-ju	Three Sisters	세 자매	Miok
2021 (42nd)	Lee Jung-eun	The Day I Died: Unclosed Case	내가 죽던 날	Suncheondaek
2021 (42nd)	Lee El	The Call	콜	Ja-ok
2021 (42nd)	Lee Soo-kyung	Miracle: Letters to the President	기적	Bo-kyeong
2022 (43rd)	Oh Na-ra	Perhaps Love	장르만 로맨스	Mi-ae
2022 (43rd)	Lee Jung-hyun	Decision to Leave	헤어질 결심	Jung-an
2022 (43rd)	Jeon Hye-jin	Hunt	헌트	Bang Joo-kyung
2022 (43rd)	Kim So-jin	Emergency Declaration	비상선언	Hee-jin
2022 (43rd)	Seo Eun-soo	The Witch: Part 2. The Other One	마녀(魔女) Part2. The Other One	Jo-hyeon
2023 (44th)
2023 (44th)	Jeon Yeo-been	Cobweb	거미집	Shin Mi-do
2023 (44th)	Krystal Jung	Cobweb	거미집	Han Yu-rim
2023 (44th)	Kim Sun-young	Concrete Utopia	콘크리트 유토피아	Geum-ae
2023 (44th)	Han Sun-hwa	Honey Sweet	달짝지근해: 7510	Eun-sook
2023 (44th)	Lee Yoon-ji	Dream Palace	드림팰리스	Su-in
2024 (45th)
2024 (45th)	Lee Sang-hee	My Name Is Loh Kiwan	로기완	Seon-ju
2024 (45th)	Gong Seung-yeon	Handsome Guys	핸섬가이즈	Kim Mi-na
2024 (45th)	Yeom Hye-ran	Citizen of a Kind	시민덕희	Bong-rim
2024 (45th)	Lim Ji-yeon	Revolver	리볼버	Jeong Yoon-sun
2024 (45th)	Han Sun-hwa	Pilot	파일럿	Han Jung-mi
2025 (46th)
2025 (46th)	Park Ji-hyun	Hidden Face	히든페이스	Kim Mi-jo
2025 (46th)	Shin Hyun-been	The Ugly	얼굴	Jung Young-hee
2025 (46th)	Yeom Hye-ran	No Other Choice	어쩔수가없다	Lee A-ra
2025 (46th)	Lee Jung-eun	My Daughter is a Zombie	좀비딸	Kim Bam-sun
2025 (46th)	Jeon Yeo-been	Dark Nuns	검은 수녀들	Sister Michaela

== Multiple wins and nominations ==
The following individuals received two or more Best Supporting Actress awards:

Wins	Actress
3	Hwang Jung-seun
2	Jung Kyung-soon
2	Kang Hye-jung

The following individuals received four or more Best Supporting Actress nominations:

Nominations	Actress
6	Jang Young-nam
5	Kim Hae-sook
5	Ra Mi-ran
4	Bang Eun-hee
4	Kim Bo-yeon

== General references ==
- "Winners and nominees lists". Blue Dragon Film Awards (in Korean). Archived from the original on 27 January 2022.
- "Blue Dragon Film Awards". Naver (in Korean).
