= 17th Buil Film Awards =

2008 South Korean award ceremony

- Date: October 9, 2008
- Site: Haeundae Grand Hotel, Haeundae, Busan
- Hosted by: Kwak Kyung-taek; Ye Ji-won

The 17th Buil Film Awards (Korean: 부일영화상) ceremony was hosted by the Busan-based daily newspaper Busan Ilbo. It was held on October 9, 2008 at the Haeundae Grand Hotel's Grand Ballroom in Busan.

== Nominations and winners ==
Complete list of nominees and winners:

(Winners denoted in bold)

Best Film	Best Director
**Night and Day**; The Chaser; Sunny	**Na Hong-jin** - **The Chaser**; Hong Sang-soo - Night and Day; Hur Jin-ho - Happiness; Kim Hyun-seok - Scout
Best Actor	Best Actress
**Kim Yoon-seok** - **The Chaser**; Ha Jung-woo - The Chaser, Beastie Boys; Han Suk-kyu - Eye for an Eye; Jung Woo-sung - The Good, the Bad, the Weird; Kim Young-ho - Night and Day	**Soo Ae** - **Sunny**; Im Soo-jung - Happiness; Kim Hae-sook - Viva! Love
Best Supporting Actor	Best Supporting Actress
**Kim Min-jun** - **A Love**; Gi Ju-bong - Viva! Love; Jung Jae-young - Going by the Book; Park Hee-soon - Seven Days; Song Young-chang - The Good, the Bad, the Weird, M	**Kim Hae-sook** - **Open City**; Gong Hyo-jin - M; Kim Ji-young - Forever the Moment; Seo Young-hee - Shadows in the Palace
Best New Actor	Best New Actress
**Im Ji-kyu** - **Milky Way Liberation Front**, **Who's That Knocking at My Door?**; Jang Keun-suk - The Happy Life; Shin Myung-cheol - Crossing	**Yoo Yeon-mi** - **With a Girl of Black Soil**; Ahn So-hee - Hellcats; Lee Ha-na - Le Grand Chef; Nam Gyu-ri - Death Bell
Best New Director	Best Screenplay
**Oh Joum-kyun** - **Viva! Love**; Kim Mee-jung - Shadows in the Palace; Na Hong-jin - The Chaser; Yang Hea-hoon - Who's That Knocking at My Door?; Yoon Seong-ho - Milky Way Liberation Front	**Kim Hyun-seok** - **Scout**; Hong Sang-soo - Night and Day; Na Hong-jin - The Chaser; Na Hyun - Forever the Moment
Best Cinematography	Best Editing
**Lee Mo-gae** - **The Good, the Bad, the Weird**; Kim Hyung-koo - Happiness; Hong Kyung-pyo - M, Eye for an Eye; Lee Sung-jae - The Chaser	**Kim Sun-min** - **The Chaser**, **Who's That Knocking at My Door?**, **Hellcats**; Nam Na-yeong - The Good, the Bad, the Weird, Dachimawa Lee; Shin Min-kyung - The Guard Post, Open City, Seven Days
Best Art Direction	Best Lighting
**Cho Hwa-sung** - **The Good, the Bad, the Weird**; Yoon Sang-yoon, Yoo Joo-ho - M	**Choi Chul-soo** - **M**; Park Se-mun - Shadows in the Palace, Sunny; Park Soon-hong - Death Bell; Lee Cheol-oh - The Chaser; Yoon Dong-woo - The Guard Post
Best Music	Technical Award
**Bang Jun-seok** - **Sunny**, **Eye for an Eye**; Jang Young-gyu, Dalpalan - The Good, the Bad, the Weird; Lee Byung-hoon - Sunny, The Happy Life	**Jeong Do-an** - **The Good, the Bad, the Weird (Special Effects)**; Hong Jang-pyo - Sunny (Special Effects); Kim Dong-won - The Guard Post (Special Effects); Lee Chang-man - Seven Days (Special Make-up)
Special Jury Prize	Achievement Award in Film Development
**Ji Jung-hyeon** - **The Good, the Bad, the Weird**	**Shin Seong-il**
Buil Readers' Jury Award
**The Chaser**; Forever the Moment; The Good, the Bad, the Weird; Night and Day; Sunny
