= Blue Dragon Film Award for Best Music =

Honor awarded to film scores deemed the best in South Korea

- Awarded for: The best score in South Korean cinema
- Country: South Korea
- Presented by: Blue Dragon Film Awards
- First award: 1963
- Website: www.blueaward.co.kr

The Blue Dragon Film Award for Best Music is one of the awards that is presented annually at the Blue Dragon Film Awards by Sports Chosun, which is typically held at the end of the year.

== Winners ==
#	Year	Composer	Film
1	1963	Kim Hee-jo	Bloodline
2	1964	Lee Bong-jo	Barefooted Youth
3	1965	Jeon Jeong-geun	Heukmaek
4	1966	Kim Dong-jin	The Sun Rises Again
5	1967	Jeong Yoon-joo	The Fishing Boats are Full
6	1969	Jeong Yoon-joo	Starting Point
7	1970	Hwang Mun-pyeong	A Queen of Misfortune
8	1971	Han Sang-ki	Frozen Spring
9	1972	Kim Hee-jo	Patriotic Martyr An Jung-gun
10	1973	Jeong Yoon-joo	Gate of Woman
25	2004	Jo Seong-woo	When Spring Comes
26	2005	Kim Jun-seong	Marathon
27	2006	Lee Byung-woo	The King and the Clown
28	2007	Lee Byung-hoon, Bang Jun-seok	The Happy Life
29	2008	Lee Byung-hoon, Bang Jun-seok	Sunny
30	2009	Jo Yeong-wook	Thirst
31	2010	Mowg	I Saw the Devil
32	2011	Mowg	Silenced
33	2012	Jo Yeong-wook	Nameless Gangster: Rules of the Time
34	2013	Mowg	Hwayi: A Monster Boy
35	2014	Jo Yeong-wook	Kundo: Age of the Rampant
36	2015	Bang Jun-seok	The Throne
36	2016	Jang Young-gyu & Dalpalan	The Wailing
38	2017	Jo Young-wook	A Taxi Driver
39	2018	Dalpalan	Believer
40	2019	Kim Tae-seong	Svaha: The Sixth Finger
41	2020	Dalpalan	Samjin Company English Class
42	2021	Bang Jun-seok	The Book of Fish
43	2022	Jo Yeong-wook	Decision to Leave
44	2023	Chang Kiha	Smugglers
45	2024	Primary	Love in the Big City
46	2025	Jo Yeong-wook	No Other Choice

== General references ==
- "Winners and nominees lists". Blue Dragon Film Awards (in Korean). Archived from the original on 27 January 2022.
- "Blue Dragon Film Awards". Naver (in Korean).
