= 45th Grand Bell Awards =

2008 edition of award ceremony

- Date: June 27, 2008
- Site: COEX Convention Hall, Seoul
- Hosted by: Kim Ah-joong; Choi Ki-hwan

The Grand Bell Awards (Korean: 대종상 영화제; RR: Daejongsang Yeonghwajae), also known as Daejong Film Awards, are determined and presented annually by The Motion Pictures Association of Korea for excellence in film in South Korea. The Grand Bell Awards were first presented in 1962 and have gained prestige as the Korean equivalent of the American Academy Awards.

== 45th ceremony ==
The 45th Grand Bell Awards ceremony was held at the COEX Convention Hall in Seoul on June 27, 2008 and hosted by Kim Ah-joong and announcer Choi Ki-hwan.

== Nominations and winners ==
(Winners denoted in bold)

Best Film	Best Director
**The Chaser**; Happiness; The Happy Life; Secret Sunshine; Seven Days	**Na Hong-jin** - **The Chaser**; Hur Jin-ho - Happiness; Lee Chang-dong - Secret Sunshine; Lee Joon-ik - The Happy Life; Won Shin-yun - Seven Days
Best Actor	Best Actress
**Kim Yoon-seok** - **The Chaser**; Ha Jung-woo - The Chaser; Hwang Jung-min - Happiness; Im Chang-jung - Scout; Song Kang-ho - Secret Sunshine	**Yunjin Kim** - **Seven Days**; Im Soo-jung - Happiness; Jeon Do-yeon - Secret Sunshine; Kim Hae-sook - Viva! Love; Park Jin-hee - Shadows in the Palace
Best Supporting Actor	Best Supporting Actress
**Yoo Jun-sang** - **Wide Awake**; Gi Ju-bong - Viva! Love; Kang Shin-il - Black House; Park Chul-min - May 18; Son Hyun-joo - The Devil's Game	**Kim Hae-sook** - **Open City**; Gong Hyo-jin - Happiness; Kim Ji-young - Forever the Moment; Kim Sung-ryung - Shadows in the Palace; Seo Young-hee - The Chaser
Best New Actor	Best New Actress
**Daniel Henney** - **My Father**; Jang Keun-suk - The Happy Life; Kim Young-min - Viva! Love; Lee Dong-gun - Love Now; Oh Man-seok - Our Town	**Han Ye-seul** - **Miss Gold Digger**; Han Chae-young - Love Now; Kim Hye-na - Viva! Love; Lee Ha-na - Le Grand Chef; Lee Tae-ran - Love Exposure
Best New Director	Best Screenplay
**Oh Joum-kyun** - **Viva! Love**; Jung Gil-young - Our Town; Gina Kim - Never Forever; Kim Mee-jung - Shadows in the Palace; Na Hong-jin - The Chaser	**Park Yoon** - **Viva! Love**; Hur Jin-ho, Lee Suk-yeon, Seo Yoo-min, Shin Joon-ho - Happiness; Kim Hyun-seok - Scout; Na Hong-jin - The Chaser; Yoon Jae-gu - Seven Days
Best Cinematography	Best Editing
**Lee Sung-jae** - **The Chaser**; Choi Young-hwan - Seven Days; Kim Hyung-koo - Happiness; Lee Hyung-deok - Shadows in the Palace; Park Hee-ju - Le Grand Chef	**Shin Min-kyung** - **Seven Days**; Kim Sang-bum, Kim Jae-bum - The Happy Life; Kim Sun-min - The Chaser; Ko Im-pyo - M; Moon In-dae - Forever the Moment
Best Art Direction	Best Lighting
**Yoo Joo-ho, Yoon Sang-yoon** - **M**; Cho Hwa-sung - Black House; Jung Ku-ho, Kim Jin-cheol - Hwang Jin-yi; Lee Ha-jun - Shadows in the Palace; Lee Tae-hun - Muoi: The Legend of a Portrait	**Park Se-mun** - **Shadows in the Palace**; Kim Sung-kwan - Seven Days; Choi Chul-soo - M; Im Jae-young - Hwang Jin-yi; Nam Jin-a - Muoi: The Legend of a Portrait
Best Costume Design	Best Music
**Jeong Jeong-eun** - **Hwang Jin-yi**; Kim So-hyun - Love Now; Lee Sung-hoon - Le Grand Chef; Shim Hyun-sub - Shadows in the Palace; Yang Min-hye - Once Upon a Time	**Won Il** - **Hwang Jin-yi**; Bang Jun-seok, Lee Byung-hoon - The Happy Life; Park Yeong-ran - Epitaph; Kim Jun-seong - Seven Days; Choi Seung-hyun - Wide Awake
Best Visual Effects	Best Sound Effects
**Younggu Art Studios** - **D-War**; Kim Dong-won - The Guard Post; Jeon Geon-ik - Seven Days; Jeong Do-an, Yu Yeong-jae - M; Kim Gwang-su - Epitaph	**Lee Seung-chul, Lee Eun-ju** - **Seven Days**; Im Hyung-geun - The Happy Life; Kim Sin-yong - The Chaser; Oh Seong-jin - Shadows in the Palace; Park Jun-oh - M
Best Planning	Popularity Award
**Kim Su-jin, Yun In-beom** - **The Chaser**; Choi Seok-hwan - The Happy Life; Han Gi-joong, Kim Mi-young - Off Road; Park Heung-sik, Bang Chu-sung - The Railroad; Shim Jae-myung, Kim Hyeon-cheol, Kim Kyun-hee - Forever the Moment	**Kim Yoon-seok** - **The Chaser**; **Han Ye-seul** - **Miss Gold Digger**
Overseas Popularity Award	Lifetime Achievement Award
**Cha Tae-hyun** - **BA:BO**	**Yoo Dong-hun** (Screenwriter)
