= Kim Hae-sook =

South Korean actress (born 1955)

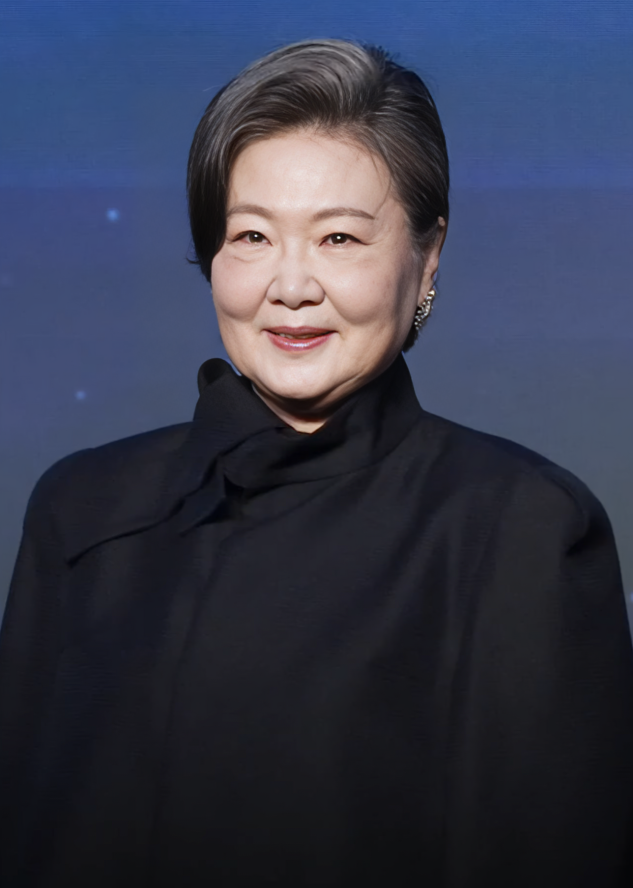
- Kim in November 2024
- Born: December 30, 1955 (age 70); Busan, South Korea
- Education: Kyung Hee University
- Occupation: Actress
- Years active: 1975–present
- Children: 2
- Honours: Eungwan Order of Cultural Merit (2025)

Korean name
- Hangul: 김해숙
- Hanja: 金海淑
- RR: Gim Haesuk
- MR: Kim Haesuk

Kim Hae-sook (Korean: 김해숙; born December 30, 1955) is a South Korean actress.

== Career ==
In 1974, she made her acting debut in MBC's Chief Inspector. Over the past decade, she has won over 10 awards and appeared in over 30 films. Kim Hae-sook has published a book entitled Mother of Hallyu Stars: Kim Hae-sook's Story.

== Filmography ==
Key
†	Denotes films that have not yet been released

=== Film ===
Year	Title	Role	Notes	Ref.
1976	Angry Apple			
1981	A Battle Journal			
1981	The One Love			
1981	The Door to the Flesh			
1982	Mistress			
1982	Die to Live			
1982	Woman of Fire '82			
1983	I Like Women Better			
1984	Road to Peace			
1984	The Beloved, Part 3			
1984	No More Sexual Life, Part 2			
1985	Love in the Dark			
1985	The Headless Murderess			
1986	Rain Falling on Youngdong Bridge			
1987	Eve's Second Bedroom			
1992	Winter Galaxy			
2000	The Legend of Gingko			
2001	My Sassy Girl			
2002	Marrying the Mafia	Dae-seo's mother		
2003	Oh! Happy Day	Yang Mi-sook		
2003	Scent of Love	In-ha's mother		
2004	Dead Friend	Ji-won's mother		
2004	My Brother	Mother		
2005	Wet Dreams 2	Sung-eun's mother		
2005	My Girl and I	Su-ho's mother		
2006	Sunflower	Yang Deok-ja		
2008	Open City	Kang Man-ok		
2008	Viva! Love	Bong-soon		
2008	Eye for an Eye	Do-soo's mother		
2009	Thirst	Mrs. Ra		
2010	A Long Visit	Mother		
2011	Mama	Ok-joo		
2012	Wonderful Radio	Mrs. Lee		
2012	The Thieves	Chewing Gum		
2012	Tone-deaf Clinic	Dong-joo's mother		
2013	Tough as Iron	Soon-i		
2013	Hope	Song Jung-sook		
2014	Kundo: Age of the Rampant	Dolmuchi's mother		
2015	Helios	Park Young-sook		
2015	Assassination	Cafe Anemone owner	Cameo	
2015	The Throne	Queen Inwon		
2016	The Handmaiden	Sasaki		
2016	The Tunnel	Minister	Special appearance	
2016	Miss Butcher	Necropsic		
2017	Along With the Gods: The Two Worlds	God of Indolence Hell		
2017	New Trial	Soon-im		
2017	RV: Resurrected Victims	Choi Myung-sook		
2018	Herstory	Bae Jeong-gil		
2022	Alienoid	Old woman		
2023	Our Season	Bok-ja		
2026	No Other Choice	Ok Sang-yep	Cameo	
TBA	Portrait of a Family	Lee Gi-sik		

=== Television series ===
Year	Title	Role	Notes	Ref.
1974	Chief Inspector			
1974	Class 3			
1979	Become a Mountain and a River			
1979	Last Witness	Son Ji-hye		
1980	One Hundred Years' Guests	Jung-ah		
1980	Kanyangrok	Ah-ji		
1981	Sae-ah			
1982	Annals of Denial - Kim Kap-soon			
1982	Mi-ryeon	Kim So-hyo		
1982	Mother			
1982	Nari House			
1983	Portrait of You			
1983	500 Years of Joseon – "The King of Chudong Palace"	Queen Jeongan		
1984	Nongmu (Farm Dance)			
1984	500 Years of Joseon – "The Ume Tree in the Midst of the Snow"	Jeong Gwi-in		
1984	MBC Bestseller Theater – "Let's Borrow Your Ears"	Yoon-ae	one act-drama	
1986	Oppa, My Oppa			
1986	Ggurugi			
1986	Morning Dew on Every Blade of Grass			
1988	500 Years of Joseon – "Queen Inhyeon"	Queen Myeongseong		
1988	MBC Bestseller Theater – "Widow"		one act-drama	
1988	Forget Tomorrow	Ji-sook		
1990	Love Opened in Every Room	Lee Sang-hoon's mother		
1990	500 Years of Joseon – "Daewongun"	Na-hab Yang		
1990	The Dancing Gayageum			
1991	Another's Happiness	Soon-mi		
1991	Yushimcho			
1992	Rainbow in Mapo			
1993	To Live	Soo-jung		
1993	The Third Republic	Park Jae-hee		
1993	Love and Farewell			
1993	Our Paradise	Dong-gun's mother		
1994	Parting	Na Jeong-im		
1994	The Moon of Seoul	Sang-guk's mother		
1995	Sukhee	Oh In-shil		
1995	West Palace			
1995	Same Period	Yong-ja's mother		
1995	Confession	Chae-young		
1995	LA Arirang			
1996	Full Heart			
1996	Under Seoul's Sky			
1996	White Dandelion			
1997	Brothers			
1997	Because I Really	Yang Dong-hee		
1997	Because I Love You	Hyeon-yi's mother		
1998	Purity			
1998	For Love	Young-joon's mother		
1998	My Love by My Side	Kim Young-joo		
1998	The Age of the 3 Kim's	Kim Ok-suk		
1999	Encounter			
1999	Did We Really Love?	Jae-ho's mother		
1999	You	Dong-seo		
1999	Queen	Jang-mi's mother		
1999	You Don't Know My Mind			
1999	Hur Jun	Ham Ahn's woman		
2000	Fireworks	Min-kyung's aunt		
2000	Autumn in My Heart	Kim Soon-im		
2000	The More I Love	Maeng Soon-ja		
2000	Some Like It Hot			
2001	Ladies of the Palace	Madam Park		
2001	Law of Marriage	Oh Mi-ja		
2001	Her House	Young-soon		
2001	This is Love	Jang Oh-bok		
2002	Winter Sonata	Lee Young-hee		
2002	Romance	Lee Young-sook		
2002	Golden Wagon	Kim Jin-bun		
2002	To Be with You	Kang Young-sook		
2002	Confession			
2003	Like a Flowing River	Sang-hee's mother		
2003	Country Princess	Kim Kil-nyeo		
2003	Summer Scent	Min-woo's mother		
2003	Wedding Gift	Park Jin-sook		
2003	Pearl Necklace	Jung In-sook		
2004	Sweet 18	Jung-sook's mother		
2004	Little Women	Yoon-ja		
2004	Passion	Ms. Jung		
2004	Oh Feel Young	Park Ok-ja		
2004	Precious Family	Kim Ok-hwa		
2005	My Rosy Life	Soon-yi's birth mother		
2005	Bizarre Bunch	Kang Min-sook		
2006	End of Love	Jang Yong-shil		
2006	Spring Waltz	Jo Yang-soon		
2006	Infamous Chil Princesses	Kyung Myung-ja		
2006	Stranger than Paradise	Kim Bok-ja		
2006	My Love Dal-ja	Oh Dal-ja		
2007	Surgeon Bong Dal-hee	Yang Eun-ja		
2007	Moon Hee	Jang Han-na		
2007	Likeable or Not	Oh Dong-ji		
2007	First Wives' Club	Ahn Yang-soon		
2008	Robber	Lee Soon-seom		
2008	White Lie	Shin Jung-ok		
2009	Cain and Abel	Na Hye-joo		
2009	Good Job, Good Job	Wang Young-soon		
2010	Life Is Beautiful	Kim Min-jae		
2011	A Thousand Days' Promise	Kang Soo-jung		
2011	Saving Mrs. Go Bong-shil	Go Bong-shil		
2012	Can't Live Without You	Jang In-ja		
2012	My Kids Give Me a Headache	Lee Ji-ae		
2013	I Can Hear Your Voice	Eo Choon-shim		
2013	Wang's Family	Lee Ang-geum		
2013	The Suspicious Housekeeper	Housekeeping Agency director Hong		
2014	Wonderful Day in October	Kang Yoon-geum		
2014	Hotel King	Baek Mi-nyeo		
2014	Marriage, Not Dating	Shin Bong-hyang		
2014	Pinocchio	Park Rosa		
2014	You Are the Only One	Oh Mal-soo		
2015	Make a Woman Cry	Park Hwa-soon		
2016	Yeah, That's How It Is	Han Hye-kyung		
2017	Saimdang, Memoir of Colors	Kim Jung-hee		
2017	Whisper	Kim Sook-hee		
2017	My Father Is Strange	Na Young-shil		
2017	Judge vs. Judge	Yoo Myung-hee		
2018	About Time	Oh So-nyeo		
2018	Room No. 9	Jang Hwa-sa		
2019	Babel	Sin Hyeon-sook		
2019	Mother of Mine	Park Seon-ja		
2020	Hospital Playlist	Jung Ro-sa	Season 1–2	
2020	Start-Up	Choi Won-deok		
2021	Inspector Koo	Yong Guk-jang		
2022	Tomorrow	Jade Hwang		
2022	Under the Queen's Umbrella	Queen Dowager		
2023	Divorce Attorney Shin	Kim So-yeon's mother	Cameo	
2023	Revenant	Na Byung-hee		
2023	Strong Girl Nam-soon	Gil Joong-gan		
2023	My Demon	Joo Cheon-sook		
2024	Who Is She	Oh Mal-soon		
2026	My Royal Nemesis	Nam Ok-soon		
2026	The Wonderfools	Kim Jeon-bok		

=== Web series ===
Year	Title	Role	Ref.
2023–2024	Gyeongseong Creature	Mrs. Nawol	
2024	Mr. Plankton	Beom Ho-ja	
2025	Tempest	Chae Kyeong-sin	

== Bibliography ==
Year	Title	Notes	Ref.
2005	Mother of Hallyu Stars: Kim Hae-sook's Story	Memoir	

== Accolades ==
=== Awards and nominations ===
Year	Award	Category	Nominated work	Result	Ref.
2000	KBS Drama Awards	Best Supporting Actress	Autumn in My Heart	Won	
2004	25th Blue Dragon Film Awards	Best Supporting Actress	My Brother	Nominated	
2004	3rd Korean Film Awards	Best Actress	My Brother	Nominated	
2004	KBS Drama Awards	Best Supporting Actress	Oh Feel Young	Won	
2005	KBS Drama Awards	Top Excellence Award, Actress	My Rosy Life	Won	
2006	KBS Drama Awards	Top Excellence Award, Actress	Infamous Chil Princesses, Spring Waltz	Nominated	
2007	16th Japan Movie Critics Awards	International Cooperation Award	—N/a	Won	
2007	SBS Drama Awards	Best Supporting Actress in a Serial Drama	First Wives' Club	Nominated	
2008	2nd Korea Drama Awards	Special Jury Prize	First Wives' Club	Won	
2008	SBS Drama Awards	Top Excellence Award, Actress	First Wives' Club	Nominated	
2008	17th Buil Film Awards	Best Supporting Actress	Open City	Won	
2008	17th Buil Film Awards	Best Actress	Viva! Love	Nominated	
2008	7th Korean Film Awards	Best Actress	Viva! Love	Nominated	
2008	45th Grand Bell Awards	Best Actress	Viva! Love	Nominated	
2008	45th Grand Bell Awards	Best Supporting Actress	Open City	Won	
2008	29th Blue Dragon Film Awards	Best Supporting Actress	Open City	Nominated	
2009	6th Max Movie Awards	Best Supporting Actress	Open City	Won	
2009	45th Baeksang Arts Awards	Best Actress (Film)	Viva! Love	Nominated	
2009	17th Chunsa Film Art Awards	Best Supporting Actress	Thirst	Won	
2009	5th University Film Festival of Korea	Best Supporting Actress	Thirst	Won	
2009	46th Grand Bell Awards	Best Supporting Actress	Thirst	Nominated	
2009	30th Blue Dragon Film Awards	Best Supporting Actress	Thirst	Won	
2009	SBS Drama Awards	Best Supporting Actress in a Drama Special	Cain and Abel	Nominated	
2010	3rd Korea Drama Awards	Best Supporting Actress	Life Is Beautiful	Won	
2011	SBS Drama Awards	Special Award, Actress in a Special Planning Drama	A Thousand Days' Promise	Nominated	
2012	MBC Drama Awards	Golden Acting Award, Actress	Can't Live Without You	Nominated	
2012	33rd Blue Dragon Film Awards	Best Supporting Actress	The Thieves	Nominated	
2012	21st Buil Film Awards	Best Supporting Actress	The Thieves	Nominated	
2012	49th Grand Bell Awards	Best Supporting Actress	The Thieves	Won	
2013	4th KOFRA Film Awards	Best Supporting Actress	The Thieves	Won	
2013	SBS Drama Awards	Special Award, Actress in a Miniseries	I Can Hear Your Voice	Nominated	
2013	KBS Drama Awards	Top Excellence Award, Actress	Wang's Family	Nominated	
2015	52nd Grand Bell Awards	Best Supporting Actress	The Throne	Won	
2016	SBS Drama Awards	Top Excellence Award, Actress in a Serial Drama	Yes, That's How It Is	Won	
2017	Korean Film Shining Star Awards	Star Award	New Trial	Won	
2017	54th Grand Bell Awards	Best Supporting Actress	New Trial	Nominated	
2017	38th Blue Dragon Film Awards	Best Supporting Actress	New Trial	Nominated	
2017	KBS Drama Awards	Top Excellence Award, Actress	My Father is Strange	Nominated	
2017	KBS Drama Awards	Excellence Award, Actress in a Serial Drama	My Father is Strange	Nominated	
2018	55th Grand Bell Awards	Best Actress	Herstory	Nominated	
2018	6th Marie Claire Asia Star Awards	Actress of the Year	Herstory	Won	
2019	12th Korea Drama Awards	Grand Prize (Daesang)	Mother of Mine	Nominated	
2019	27th Korean Culture and Entertainment Awards	Grand Prize (Daesang)	Mother of Mine	Won	
2019	KBS Drama Awards	Top Excellence Award, Actress	Mother of Mine	Nominated	
2019	KBS Drama Awards	Excellence Award, Actress in a Serial Drama	Mother of Mine	Nominated	
2022	MBC Drama Awards	Best Character Award	Tomorrow	Nominated	
2023	SBS Drama Awards	Best Supporting Performance in a Miniseries Genre/Action Drama	Revenant	Nominated	

=== State honors ===
Name of country, year given, and name of honor
Country	Year	Honor	Ref.
South Korea (Note: Honors are given at the Korean Popular Culture and Arts Awards, arranged by the Korea Creative Content Agency and hosted by the Ministry of Culture, Sports and Tourism. They are awarded to those who have contributed to the arts and South Korea's pop culture.)	2010	Prime Minister's Commendation	
South Korea	2025	Eungwan Order of Cultural Merit	

=== Listicles ===
Name of publisher, year listed, name of listicle, and placement
Publisher	Year	Listicle	Placement	Ref.
Gallup Korea	2023	Gallup Korea's Television Actor of the Year	8th (Note: Tied with Kim Hye-soo and Han Suk-kyu with 2.4% point)	
Korean Film Council	2021	Korean Actors 200 (Note: Introduces 200 actors that best represent the present and future of Korean cinema to the people in the film industry all over the world.)	Included	
