= The Divine Weapon =

- Theatrical poster
- Hangul: 신기전
- Hanja: 神機箭
- RR: Singijeon
- MR: Sin'gijŏn
- Directed by: Kim Yoo-jin
- Written by: Lee Man-hee
- Produced by: Kang Woo-suk
- Starring: Jung Jae-young; Han Eun-jung; Huh Joon-ho; Ahn Sung-ki
- Cinematography: Byun Hee-sung
- Edited by: Kim Hyeon
- Music by: Jo Seong-woo
- Production companies: Cinema Service; KnJ Entertainment
- Distributed by: CJ Entertainment
- Release date: 4 September 2008
- Running time: 134 minutes
- Country: South Korea
- Language: Korean
- Box office: US$19,991,573

The Divine Weapon (Korean: 신기전; RR: Singijeon) is a 2008 South Korean action drama film starring Jung Jae-young and Han Eun-jung. It was released on September 4, 2008.

== Plot ==
During the reign of King Sejong the Great, Joseon Korea faces increasing hostility from Ming China. Ming China, without restraint, mounts unrelenting demands against the Korean crown, further entrenching distrust and aversion to subservience. Ming China has especially been provoked by leaked news that Korea had underway an arms development program that would undermine theirs. Mounting pressure by the threat of invasion and sending down the Emperor's commands requesting tribute of young Korean girls to be sent to China, to reduce Korea's manpower and debilitate its military capacity, the grip around the throat becomes ever tighter. It seems Joseon's fate is dependent on completing an unfinished project – that of making Singijeon or the Divine Weapon a reality.

In the final battle, severely outnumbered Korean forces (less than 100 men) successfully defeated the thousands of Ming Chinese in armed combat with spears, bombs, and several finished Singijeon via several hwachas. Thousands of Ming Chinese foot soldiers are killed as the arrows in the Singijeon are launched. More are killed with the gunpowder packed inside the arrows (standard Singeijeons). Those in the Ming Chinese army who remained are finished off with the large model Singijeons (대신기전, Grand Singijeon), except one of the nobles who prefers peace over warfare.

== Cast ==
- Jung Jae-young as Seol-joo
- Han Eun-jung as Hong-ri
- Huh Joon-ho as Chang-kang
- Ahn Sung-ki as King Sejong
- Jeong Seong-mo as Sa Ma-soon
- Kim Myeong-soo as Ggya Oh-ryung
- Lee Do-kyeong as Hong-man
- Do Yi-seong as In-ha
- Ryu Hyun-kyung as Bang-wook
- Seo Joo-seong as Moo-saeng
- Cha Soon-bae as Ming1

== Release ==
The Divine Weapon was released in South Korea on 4 September 2008, topping the box office on its opening weekend with 630,257 admissions. It led the box office for a further two weeks, and as of 9 November had accumulated a total of 3,749,611 admissions. As of 16 November, the film had grossed a total of US$19,991,573. making it the seventh most popular domestic film that year.

== Reception ==
The film was heavily criticized by Chinese audiences for historical inaccuracies and revisionism. For example, the movie depicted Ming China and Joseon Korea in conflict around 1448, however in reality the two nations never fought and were in fact allies in resisting Japanese invasion. The depicted tribute of young girls occurred under the Mongol-led Yuan dynasty (1271–1368). The movie also suggested that the Ming dynasty tried to steal multiple rocket carts blueprints from Korea, despite in reality China developing rocket arrows and rocket carts that predate Korean efforts.

== Awards and nominations ==
2008 Blue Dragon Film Awards

- Nomination – Best Director – Kim Yoo-jin
- Nomination – Best Art Direction – Min Eon-ok
- Nomination – Best New Actress – Han Eun-jung

2008 Korean Film Awards

- Nomination – Best Actor – Jung Jae-young
- Nomination – Best Sound – Oh Se-jin

2009 Fajr International Film Festival, "World Panorama" section

- Best Technical and Artistic Achievement

2009 Grand Bell Awards

- Best Film
- Best Editing – Kim Hyeon
- Best Sound – Oh Se-jin
- Nomination – Best Actor – Jung Jae-young
- Nomination – Best Lighting – Im Jae-young
- Nomination – Best Visual Effects – Jeong Seong-jin, Han Young-woo
- Nomination – Best Planning – Lee Young-in

Preceded by The Chaser	Grand Bell Awards for Best Film; 2009	Succeeded by Poetry
