= 29th Blue Dragon Film Awards =

2008 edition of award ceremony

- Date: November 20, 2008
- Site: KBS Hall, Yeouido, Seoul, South Korea
- Hosted by: Jung Joon-ho; Kim Hye-soo

Television coverage
- Network: KBS

The 29th Blue Dragon Film Awards ceremony was held on November 20, 2008 at the KBS Hall in Yeouido, Seoul, South Korea. Hosted by actors Jung Joon-ho and Kim Hye-soo, it was presented by Sports Chosun and broadcast on KBS.

== Nominations and winners ==
Complete list of nominees and winners:

(Winners denoted in bold)

Best Film	Best Director
**Forever the Moment**; The Chaser; Crossing; The Good, the Bad, the Weird; Seven Days	**Kim Jee-woon** - **The Good, the Bad, the Weird**; Kim Tae-kyun - Crossing; Kim Yoo-jin - The Divine Weapon; Won Shi-yeon - Seven Days; Yim Soon-rye - Forever the Moment
Best Actor	Best Actress
**Kim Yoon-seok** - **The Chaser**; Ha Jung-woo - The Chaser; Kim Joo-hyuk - My Wife Got Married; Lee Byung-hun - The Good, the Bad, the Weird; Sul Kyung-gu - Public Enemy Returns; Song Kang-ho - The Good, the Bad, the Weird	**Son Ye-jin** - **My Wife Got Married**; Gong Hyo-jin - Crush and Blush; Yunjin Kim - Seven Days; Moon So-ri - Forever the Moment; Soo Ae - Sunny
Best Supporting Actor	Best Supporting Actress
**Park Hee-soon** - **Seven Days**; Im Won-hee - Le Grand Chef; Jung Kyung-ho - Sunny; Ko Chang-seok - Rough Cut; Uhm Tae-woong - Forever the Moment	**Kim Ji-young** - **Forever the Moment**; Kim Hae-sook - Open City; Kim Mi-sook - Seven Days; Park Si-yeon - Dachimawa Lee; Seo Young-hee - The Chaser
Best New Actor	Best New Actress
**Kang Ji-hwan** - **Rough Cut**; **So Ji-sub** - **Rough Cut**; Kim Nam-gil - Public Enemy Returns; Lee Yeong-hoon - The Guard Post; Ryu Tae-joon - Girl Scout	**Han Ye-seul** - **Miss Gold Digger**; Han Eun-jung - The Divine Weapon; Hwang Woo-seul-hye - Crush and Blush; Lee Ha-na - Le Grand Chef; Seo Woo - Crush and Blush
Best New Director	Best Screenplay
**Lee Kyoung-mi** - **Crush and Blush**; Jang Hoon - Rough Cut; Lee Sang-gi - Open City; Na Hong-jin - The Chaser; Oh Joum-kyun - Viva! Love	**Lee Kyoung-mi** - **Crush and Blush**; Na Hong-jin - The Chaser; Na Hyun - Forever the Moment; Song Hye-jin - My Wife Got Married; Yoon Jae-gu - Seven Days
Best Cinematography	Best Lighting
**Lee Mo-gae** - **The Good, the Bad, the Weird**; Hong Kyung-pyo - M; Kim Byeong-seo - Go Go 70s; Kim Tae-gyeong - Modern Boy; Lee Sung-jae - The Chaser	**Kang Dae-hee** - **Modern Boy**; Choi Chul-soo - M; Lee Cheol-oh - The Chaser; Oh Seung-chul - The Good, the Bad, the Weird; Shin Kyung-man - Go Go 70s
Best Art Direction	Best Music
**Cho Hwa-sung** - **The Good, the Bad, the Weird**; Jo Sang-gyeong - Modern Boy; Kang Seung-yong - Sunny; Min Eon-ok - The Divine Weapon; Yoo Joo-ho, Yoon Sang-yoon - M	**Bang Jun-seok, Lee Byung-hoon** - **Sunny**; Bang Jun-seok - Go Go 70s; Dalpalan, Jang Young-gyu - The Good, the Bad, the Weird; Kim Jun-seok, Choi Yong-rak - The Chaser; Lee Jae-jin - Modern Boy
Technical Award	Best Short Film
**Insight Visual** - **Modern Boy (CG)**; DTI - The Good, the Bad, the Weird (CG); Kim Sun-min - The Chaser (Editing); Lee Chang-man - The Guard Post (Special Make-up); Shin Min-kyung - Seven Days (Editing)	**The Unbearable Heaviness of Nagging**
Popular Star Award	Best Couple Award
**Jung Woo-sung** - **The Good, the Bad, the Weird**; **Kim Ha-neul** - **Lovers of Six Years**; **Sul Kyung-gu** - **Public Enemy Returns**; **Son Ye-jin** - **My Wife Got Married**	**Kim Joo-hyuk** and **Son Ye-jin** - **My Wife Got Married**
Honorary Popular Star Award	Audience Choice Award for Most Popular Film
**Choi Jin-sil**	**The Good, the Bad, the Weird**
