= Bang Jun-seok =

South Korean film score composer (1970–2022)

- Born: 1 August 1970; South Korea
- Died: 26 March 2022 (aged 51) New York City, U.S.
- Occupations: Film score composer; music director
- Years active: 1994–2022
- Formerly of: U&Me Blue

Korean name
- Hangul: 방준석
- RR: Bang Junseok
- MR: Pang Chunsŏk

Bang Jun-seok (Korean: 방준석; 1 August 1970 – 26 March 2022) was a South Korean film score composer and music director. He was also a member of the experimental band U&Me Blue.

Bang died of stomach cancer on March 26, 2022, in New York City.

== Filmography ==
- Tell Me Something (1999)
- Bloody Beach (2000)
- Joint Security Area (2000)
- The Coast Guard (2002)
- Who Are You? (2002) – also producer
- A Bizarre Love Triangle (2002)
- YMCA Baseball Team (2002)
- The Uninvited (2003) – music department staff
- ...ing (2003)
- Oh! Brothers (2003)
- Three... Extremes (2004)
- So Cute (2004) – music department staff
- R-Point (2004) – music department staff
- Hi! Dharma 2: Showdown in Seoul (2004)
- You Are My Sunshine (2005)
- Mr. Socrates (2005) – music department staff
- Peso (2005; short film) – also actor
- Crying Fist (2005)
- The Fox Family (2006)
- The City of Violence (2006)
- Dasepo Naughty Girls (2006) – music department staff
- The Old Garden (2006)
- Radio Star (2006)
- Drawing Paper (2007)
- Nowhere to Turn (2007) – actor
- A Good Day to Have an Affair (2007)
- Paradise Murdered (2007)
- The Happy Life (2007)
- Two Faces of My Girlfriend (2007)
- Viva! Love (2008)
- Like Father, Like Son (2008) – music department staff
- Sunny (2008)
- Eye for an Eye (2008)
- Go Go 70s (2008) – also screenwriter
- Lies (2009; short film) – actor
- If You Were Me 4 (2009) – segment "Blue Birds on the Desk"
- Timeless (2009; short film)
- Comfortable Distance (2009; short film)
- Girlfriends (2009)
- Dance Of Time (2009; documentary)
- Insadong Scandal (2009)
- A Little Pond (2009)
- Camellia (2010) – segment "Love for Sale"
- Troubleshooter (2010)
- Heartbeat (2011)
- Always (2011)
- Couples (2011)
- The Thieves (2012) – music department staff
- Jury (2013; short film) – music department staff
- Hope (2013)
- Manshin: Ten Thousand Spirits (2013; documentary) – music department staff
- Thuy (2013)
- The Throne (2015)
- Veteran (2015)
- The Magician (2015)
- A Man and a Woman (2016)
- Luck Key (2016)
- Spy Nation (2016; documentary)
- Misbehavior (2016)
- The Prison (2017)
- Becoming Who I Was (2017; documentary)
- Reset (2017)
- The Battleship Island (2017)
- Anarchist from Colony (2017)
- The Swindlers (2017)
- Along with the Gods: The Two Worlds (2017)
- Be with You (2018)
- Sunset in My Hometown (2018)
- Along with the Gods: The Last 49 Days (2018)
- Cheer Up, Mr. Lee (2019)
- Tazza: One Eyed Jack (2019)
- The Book of Fish (2021)
- Escape from Mogadishu (2021)

== Awards and nominations ==
Year	Award	Category	Nominated work	Result	Ref.
2005	26th Blue Dragon Film Awards	Best Music	You Are My Sunshine	Nominated	
2005	42nd Grand Bell Awards	Best Music	Crying Fist	Nominated	
2005	13th Chunsa Film Art Awards	Best Music	Crying Fist	Won	
2006	27th Blue Dragon Film Awards	Best Music	Radio Star	Nominated	
2006	26th Korean Association of Film Critics Awards	Best Music	Radio Star	Won	
2006	5th Korean Film Awards	Best Music	The City of Violence	Nominated	
2007	44th Grand Bell Awards	Best Music	Radio Star	Nominated	
2007	6th Korean Film Awards	Best Music	Radio Star	Won	
2007	28th Blue Dragon Film Awards	Best Music	The Happy Life	Won	
2008	29th Blue Dragon Film Awards	Best Music	Sunny	Won	
2008	29th Blue Dragon Film Awards	Best Music	Go Go 70s	Nominated	
2008	7th Korean Film Awards	Best Music	Go Go 70s	Won	
2008	17th Buil Film Awards	Best Music	Sunny	Won	
2008	45th Grand Bell Awards	Best Music	The Happy Life	Nominated	
2009	46th Grand Bell Awards	Best Music	Go Go 70s	Nominated	
2013	34th Blue Dragon Film Awards	Best Music	Hope	Nominated	
2015	36th Blue Dragon Film Awards	Best Music	The Throne	Won	
2015	36th Blue Dragon Film Awards	Best Music	Veteran	Nominated	
2015	35th Korean Association of Film Critics Awards	Best Music	The Throne	Won	
2015	52nd Grand Bell Awards	Best Music	The Throne	Nominated	
2015	19th Tallinn Black Nights Film Festival	Best Music	The Throne	Won	
2016	10th Asian Film Awards	Best Composer	The Throne	Nominated	
2016	25th Buil Film Awards	Best Music	The Throne	Nominated	
2016	25th Buil Film Awards	Best Music	Veteran	Nominated	
2017	Korean Film Producers Association Awards	Best Music	The Battleship Island	Won	
2017	26th Buil Film Awards	Best Music	The Battleship Island	Nominated	
2017	54th Grand Bell Awards	Best Music	Anarchist from Colony	Nominated	
2018	27th Buil Film Awards	Best Music	Sunset in My Hometown	Nominated	
2018	55th Grand Bell Awards	Best Music	Sunset in My Hometown	Nominated	
2021	30th Buil Film Awards	Best Music Award	Escape from Mogadishu	Won	
2021	42nd Blue Dragon Film Awards	Best Music	Escape from Mogadishu	Nominated	
2021	42nd Blue Dragon Film Awards	Best Music	The Book of Fish	Won	
2021	8th Korean Film Writers Association Awards	Best Music	The Book of Fish	Won	

=== State honors ===
Name of country, year given, and name of honor
Country	Year	Honor Or Award	Ref.
South Korea (Note: Honors are given at the Korean Popular Culture and Arts Awards, arranged by the Korea Creative Content Agency and hosted by the Ministry of Culture, Sports and Tourism. They are awarded to those who have contributed to the arts and South Korea's pop culture.)	2022	Presidential Commendation	
