= The Prison (2017 film) =

- Theatrical release poster
- Hangul: 프리즌
- RR: Peurijeun
- MR: P'ŭrijŭn
- Directed by: Na Hyun
- Written by: Na Hyun
- Produced by: Choi Ji-yoon
- Starring: Han Suk-kyu; Kim Rae-won
- Cinematography: Hong Jae-sik
- Edited by: Kim Chang-ju
- Music by: Bang Jun-seok
- Production company: Curo Holdings
- Distributed by: Showbox
- Release date: March 23, 2017
- Running time: 125 minutes
- Country: South Korea
- Language: Korean
- Box office: US$21.2 million

The Prison (Korean: 프리즌; lit. 'Prison') is a 2017 South Korean action crime film directed by Na Hyun and starring Han Suk-kyu and Kim Rae-won. It follows Yoo-gun, a former cop imprisoned for corruption, as he gets entangled in the schemes of Ik-ho, the ruthless kingpin of a prison where inmates commit perfect crimes by night. The film was released on March 23, 2017.

== Plot ==
At night, prisoners leave the walls of their jail to commit perfect crimes across South Korea—an institution that has become a hub for flawless criminal operations. Jung Ik-ho, the undisputed power and kingpin within the prison, rules over this underworld. One day, Song Yoo-gun, a former police officer with a reputation for a 100% arrest rate, is incarcerated for charges of hit-and-run, evidence tampering, and bribing the police. With his fearless attitude and hot-tempered nature, Yoo-gun quickly catches Ik-ho's attention. Ik-ho begins to pull Yoo-gun into his latest criminal schemes, gradually revealing his ruthless ambitions.

== Cast ==
- Han Suk-kyu as Jung Ik-ho
- Kim Rae-won as Song Yoo-gun
- Jung Woong-in as Governor Kang
- Jo Jae-yoon as Lee Hong-pyo
- Kim Sung-kyun as Dr. Kim
- Shin Sung-rok as Chang-gil
- Lee Geung-young as Head correctional officer Bae
- Han Sung-Yong as Gye-shik
- Han Joo-wan
- Cha Yup as Baek-jung
- Choi Sung-won
- Song Kyung-chul as Mr. Yang
- Kwak Min-ho as Hak-gyu
- Park Jin-woo as Teacher Oh
- Jeon Bae-soo
- Lee Chang-hee as Control room prison officer 1
- Na Kwang-hoon
- Yeon Song-ha
- Kim Kwang-hyun
- Seo Ho-chul
- Yoo Jung-ho as Seo Ki-tae
- Hyun Bong-shik as Agupae
- Kim Seung-hoon
- Park Jong-soo
- Byun Jung-hyun
- Lee Yong-jik
- Yun Byung-hee
- Bae Myung-jin
- Kang Shin-il
- Lee Sang-min

== Production ==
The film marks the directing debut of Na Hyun, a veteran scriptwriter in the Korean film industry.

According to its distribution company Showbox, The Prison has been sold to 62 countries. Showbox has sealed several deals on the film. After the film's launch at AFM, it goes to Well Go USA for North America; JBG Pictures for Australia, New Zealand and the UK; Lemon Tree for China; Viva Communication for the Philippines; and Movie Cloud for Taiwan. Showbox held a market screening for film on February 11, 2017 during EFM.

The Prison was invited to compete in the Brussels International Fantastic Film Festival that ran from April 4–16, 2017 and the Far East Film Festival that ran from April 21–29, 2017 in Udine, Italy.

Test shoots began on January 27, 2016. Filming began on February 14 and ended on May 22, 2016.
