= Kim Yoo-jin (director) =

South Korean film director

- Born: South Korea
- Occupation: Film director
- Years active: 1986-present

Korean name
- Hangul: 김유진
- Hanja: 金裕珍
- RR: Gim Yujin
- MR: Kim Yujin

Kim Yoo-jin (Korean: 김유진) is a South Korean film director. His films include A Promise (1998), Wild Card (2003) and The Divine Weapon (2008).

== Career ==
Kim Yoo-jin said he began his filmmaking career to "voice social opinion," notably in Only Because You Are a Woman (1990), where Won Mi-kyung played a raped housewife who faces doubt and victim blaming from her family, neighbors and inside the courtroom. But most of Kim's films have been commercial fare, with a string of box office hits from the 1980s through the 2000s. He won Best Director at the 14th Blue Dragon Film Awards for Love Is Oh Yeah! (1993), which starred Shin Hyun-joon and Kim Hye-sun. In 1995, he directed My Dear Keumhong in which Kim Kap-soo and Kim Soo-chul played the painter Koo Bon-woong and the poet Yi Sang, friends who both fall for the same concubine. Kim then cast Park Shin-yang and Jeon Do-yeon in A Promise, a melodrama about the romance between a gangster and a doctor; it drew critical acclaim for its actors and became the top-grossing Korean film of 1998. In 2003, Jung Jin-young and Yang Dong-geun played detectives determined to find a young killer and his gang in Kim's gritty cop drama Wild Card.

Kim took on a more ambitious project for his eighth feature film, which had a ₩10 billion budget and took nearly six years to produce: period action blockbuster The Divine Weapon. Starring Jung Jae-young, Ahn Sung-ki and Han Eun-jung, the Korean title Singijeon refers to a multi-launch fire arrow rocket system, a sophisticated military weapon that was secretly developed in the Joseon era during King Sejong's reign to fight off foreign invasion. The Divine Weapon was the seventh top-grossing Korean film of 2008 with 3.75 million admissions and won Best Film at the 46th Grand Bell Awards in 2009, while Kim was nominated for Best Director at the 29th Blue Dragon Film Awards and the 45th Baeksang Arts Awards.

== Filmography ==
- Hero's Love Song (1986)
- The Isle of Shiro (1988)
- Only Because You Are a Woman (1990)
- Love Is Oh Yeah! (1993)
- My Dear Keumhong (1995)
- Seven Reasons Why Beer Is Better Than a Lover (1996)
- A Promise (1998)
- Wild Card (2003) (also credited as executive producer and producer)
- The Divine Weapon (2008)

== Awards ==
- 1993 14th Blue Dragon Film Awards: Best Director (Love Is Oh Yeah!)
- 2003 11th Chunsa Film Art Awards: Special Jury Prize (Wild Card)
- 2009 Fajr International Film Festival, "World Panorama" section: Best Technical and Artistic Achievement (The Divine Weapon)
