= Gi Ju-bong =

South Korean actor

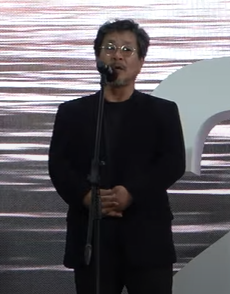
- Gi in 2019
- Born: September 3, 1955 (age 71); South Korea
- Education: Sorabol College of Arts – Theater and Film
- Occupation: Actor
- Years active: 1977–present
- Agent: PK Entertainment
- Family: Gi Guk-seo (brother)

Korean name
- Hangul: 기주봉
- Hanja: 奇周峰
- RR: Gi Jubong
- MR: Ki Chubong

Gi Ju-bong (born September 3, 1955) is a South Korean actor.

== Career ==
Gi began acting in 1977 and is notable for Offending the Audience, Sorum (2001), Viva! Love (2008) and The Spy Gone North (2018).

== Filmography ==
=== Film ===
| Year | Title | Role |
|---|---|---|
| 1981 | Children of Darkness Part 1, Young-ae the Songstress | Hyun-bae |
| 1982 | Geniuses With the Grade F | Lee Gwan-doo/Kant |
| 1982 | Come Unto Down | Friend 1 |
| 1983 | Human Market, Small Devil - An Autobiography of a Twenty-two-year-old | |
| 1988 | Sunshine at Present | Friend |
| 1991 | Who Saw the Dragon's Toenail? | |
| 1992 | Myung-ja, Akiko, Sonya | |
| 1995 | My Old Sweetheart | |
| 1997 | Bad Movie | Traveling performer |
| 1998 | The Quiet Family | Lonely man |
| 1999 | Judgement (short film) | Morgue employee |
| 1999 | A Great Chinese Restaurant | Man in his forties |
| 1999 | Nowhere to Hide | Serious crime squad chief |
| 2000 | Kilimanjaro | Suit |
| 2000 | Bichunmoo | Kwak-jung |
| 2000 | Die Bad | Auto repair boss (cameo) |
| 2000 | Joint Security Area | General Pyo |
| 2000 | Asako in Ruby Shoes | Woo-in's brother-in-law |
| 2001 | Red Heart (short film) | Park Je-myung |
| 2001 | A Woman Off Her Uniform (short film) | Man |
| 2001 | Bungee Jumping of Their Own | Dean of student affairs |
| 2001 | Friend | "Mustache" |
| 2001 | Sorum | Writer Lee |
| 2001 | Say Yes | Manager |
| 2001 | My Boss, My Hero | Sang Chun-man |
| 2002 | Driving Mrs. Park (short film) | |
| 2002 | Public Enemy | Song Haeng-ki |
| 2002 | Sympathy for Mr. Vengeance | Driver Pang |
| 2002 | Chow Yun-fat Boy Meets Brownie Girl | Yong-baek |
| 2002 | Boss X-File | 간부 prosecutor |
| 2002 | Saving My Hubby | Han Joo-tae's father |
| 2002 | Baby Alone | Yang-geun |
| 2002 | Sex Is Zero | OB/Gyn doctor |
| 2002 | Every Angel Dreams of Being a Janitor (short film) | Shoe shiner |
| 2003 | Dying Puppy | Truck driver |
| 2003 | The First Amendment of Korea | Commissioner Byun (cameo) |
| 2003 | Taxidriver Catches Taxi (short film) | Taxi driver Park Dong-sik |
| 2003 | Save the Green Planet! | Squad leader Lee |
| 2003 | Wild Card | Squad leader Kim |
| 2003 | Tube | Jungbu chief of police |
| 2003 | Sword in the Moon | Officer Jang |
| 2003 | Wonderful Days | Noah |
| 2003 | Into the Mirror | Jeon Il-seong |
| 2004 | Mokpo, Gangster's Paradise | Jo Tae-beom (cameo) |
| 2004 | Mr. Handy | Chairman Yoon |
| 2004 | Liar | Lieutenant detective |
| 2004 | Foolish Game | Director Kim |
| 2004 | Clementine | Hwang Jong-chul |
| 2004 | Dead Friend | Detective 1 |
| 2004 | Our Teatime (short film) | |
| 2004 | A Happy Day (short film) | |
| 2004 | R-Point | Captain Park |
| 2005 | Crying Fist | Yu Sang-hwan's father |
| 2005 | Spying Cam | |
| 2005 | The Crescent Moon | Uncle |
| 2006 | The Romance | Squad leader Hwang |
| 2006 | Ad-lib Night | Myung-eun's father (cameo) |
| 2007 | Pruning the Grapevine | Father Moon |
| 2007 | Fish on Land | |
| 2008 | His Last Gift | Class monitor (cameo) |
| 2008 | Night and Day | Mr. Jang |
| 2008 | Viva! Love | Mr. Ha |
| 2008 | My Dear Enemy | Man at cousin's house 1 (cameo) |
| 2008 | Heartbreak Library | Hong-soo |
| 2009 | Where is Ronny... | Choong-sik (cameo) |
| 2009 | Lifting King Kong | Director Baek (cameo) |
| 2009 | Never Belongs to Me | Catholic priest (cameo) |
| 2009 | Mom's Vacation (short film) | |
| 2010 | Vegetarian | Ji-hye's father (cameo) |
| 2010 | Saying Good-bye | Kim Joon-sik |
| 2010 | Hahaha | Curator of Tongyeong's local history museum |
| 2010 | A Good Night's Sleep for the Bad | Pornography buyer (cameo) |
| 2011 | The Day He Arrives | Producer |
| 2012 | Woosoossi | Company president Wang |
| 2013 | Nobody's Daughter Haewon | Hoo-won |
| 2013 | Norigae | Hyun Sung-bong |
| 2013 | Dear Dolphin | Therapist |
| 2013 | Montage | Ear doctor Han |
| 2013 | Hide and Seek | Sung-soo's father (cameo) |
| 2013 | Rough Play | Theater director (cameo) |
| 2013 | Steel Cold Winter | Young-jun's father (cameo) |
| 2013 | Friend: The Great Legacy | Hyung-doo |
| 2013 | The Suspect | Coroner |
| 2014 | Apostle: He Was Anointed by God | Agency official (cameo) |
| 2014 | A Hard Day | Company president Kim (cameo) |
| 2014 | Haemoo | Ship owner |
| 2014 | Hill of Freedom | Byeong-joo |
| 2015 | Empire of Lust | Jo Jun |
| 2015 | The Deal | Subsection chief Choi |
| 2015 | Coin Locker Girl | Man in suit (cameo) |
| 2015 | The Treacherous | Butcher Mr. Kim |
| 2015 | Office | Chief |
| 2015 | Right Now, Wrong Then | Kim Won-ho |
| 2015 | Hiya | |
| 2016 | Misbehavior | Shin Byung-soo |
| 2016 | The End of April | Real estate agency boss |
| 2017 | Merry Christmas Mr. Mo | Mo Geum-san |
| 2017 | The First Lap | Ji-yeong's father |
| 2017 | The Battleship Island | Ahn |
| 2018 | The Soup | President |
| 2018 | Grass | Chang-soo |
| 2018 | Hotel by the River | Yeong-hwan |
| 2018 | The Spy Gone North | Kim Jong Il |
| 2022 | The Novelist's Film | |
| 2025 | Choir of God | Standing committee member |

=== Television series ===
| Year | Title | Role |
|---|---|---|
| 2003 | All In | Bae Sang-doo |
| 2003 | Drama City: The Reason I Want to Get Married | Hagwon administrator |
| 2003 | Good Person | Detective Park |
| 2004 | Immortal Admiral Yi Sun-sin | Yoon Hwan-shi |
| 2005 | Drama City: Mr. Camel's Disappearance | Father |
| 2005 | Resurrection | Jung Sang-gook |
| 2005 | Sweet Spy | Han Yoo-il's assistant |
| 2006 | Alone in Love | Lee Dae-hoon |
| 2007 | Merry Mary | Hwang Do-chul |
| 2007 | Lobbyist | Park Joon-gil |
| 2008 | KPSI 1 | Team leader Park Won-oh |
| 2008 | Drama City: In the Name of the Father | Gap-soo |
| 2008 | Get Up | Dean of student affairs |
| 2008 | Who Are You? | Cha Chul-soo |
| 2008 | KPSI 2 | Team leader Park Won-oh |
| 2008 | Night After Night | Noh Jung-pil |
| 2009 | Partner | Ji Nam-chul |
| 2010 | You Don't Know Women | Company president Park |
| 2011 | Heartstrings | Professor |
| 2011 | Drama City: Men Cry | |
| 2011 | Me Too, Flower! | Dispatch chief |
| 2012 | Glass Mask | Shin Ki-tae |
| 2012 | KBS Drama Special: Do You Know Taekwondo? | Teacher Im |
| 2012 | KBS Drama Special: Mellow in May | Lee Ki-kwan |
| 2014 | Golden Cross | Jung Gyu-jik |
| 2014 | Reset | Department head Choi |
| 2015 | KBS Drama Special: Let's Stand Still | Kim Jong-seob |
| 2015 | The Superman Age | Director Gi Ju-bong |
| 2015 | The Producers | Park Choon-bong |
| 2016 | Lucky Romance | Je Mool-po |

== Theater ==
| Year | Title | Role | Reprised |
|---|---|---|---|
| 1978 | Krapp's Last Tape | | |
| 1979 | Offending the Audience | | 2004, 2014 |
| | Danton's Death | | |
| | "Master Harold"...and the Boys | | |
| | Woza Albert! | | |
| | Hamlet | | |
| | The Balcony | | |
| | Cheongbu | | |
| | King Lear | | |
| | Theresa's Dream | | |
| | 지피족들 | | |
| | Death of a Salesman | | |
| | Try Lying to Me | | |
| | Jeongseon Arirang Changgeuk - The Sound of the Gods | | |
| 2010 | 사나이 와타나베... 완전히 삐지다 | Watanabe | |
| 2012-2013 | Letters to My Parents | Bong-gu | |
| 2015 | Song of Water | Watanabe | |

== Awards and nominations ==
| Year | Award | Category | Nominated work | Result | Ref. |
|---|---|---|---|---|---|
| 2008 | 17th Buil Film Awards | Best Supporting Actor | Viva! Love | Nominated | |
| 2008 | 45th Grand Bell Awards | Best Supporting Actor | Viva! Love | Nominated | |
| 2018 | 5th Wildflower Film Awards | Best Actor | Merry Christmas Mr. Mo | Won | |
| 2018 | 27th Buil Film Awards | Best Actor | Merry Christmas Mr. Mo | Nominated | |
| 2018 | 2018 Locarno Festival | Best Actor | Hotel by the River | Won | |
| 2018 | 55th Grand Bell Awards | Best Supporting Actor | The Spy Gone North | Nominated | |
| 2018 | 26th Korea Culture Entertainment Awards | Best Supporting Actor | The Spy Gone North | Won | |
