= Viva! Love =

- Theatrical poster
- Directed by: Oh Joum-kyun
- Written by: Park Yoon
- Produced by: Lee Hyung-seung
- Starring: Kim Hae-sook; Gi Ju-bong; Kim Young-min; Kim Hye-na
- Cinematography: Jang Seong-baek
- Edited by: Lee Eun-soo
- Music by: Bang Jun-seok
- Production companies: IB Pictures; Sponge Entertainment
- Distributed by: Studio 2.0
- Release date: April 9, 2008
- Running time: 100 minutes
- Country: South Korea
- Language: Korean
- Box office: US$69,431

Viva! Love (Korean: 경축! 우리사랑; RR: Gyeongchuk! urisarang; lit. 'Celebrate! Our Love') is a 2008 South Korean romance film directed by Oh Joum-kyun. It won Best Film at the 45th Baeksang Arts Awards, as well as several Best New Director prizes for Oh.

== Plot ==
Bong-soon is a middle-aged housewife who runs a lodging house. She lives with her good-for-nothing husband who's quietly having an affair, and her selfish, unemployed daughter Jeong-yoon whose boyfriend Gu-sang is a tenant who owns the neighborhood laundromat. When Jeong-yoon finally lands a job, she moves out and abruptly breaks up with Gu-sang. Bong-soon sees the heartbroken Gu-sang drinking away his sorrows, and taking pity on him, she takes him home and attempts to comfort him. One thing leads to another, and the two sleep together. To her great surprise, Bong-soon ends up pregnant with Gu-sang's baby. Despite the age gap and the neighbors' disapproval, the two fall in love and Gu-sang makes Bong-soon feel like a giddy teenage girl again.

== Cast ==
- Kim Hae-sook as Bong-soon
- Gi Ju-bong as Mr. Ha, Bong-soon's husband
- Kim Young-min as Gu-sang
- Kim Hye-na as Jeong-yoon
- Bang Eun-hee as Hairdresser
- Min Kyeong-jin as Mr. Choi
- Jeong Jae-jin as Mr. Lee
- Shin Cheol-jin as Mr. Yoon
- Hong Seok-yeon as Mr. Kim
- Jo Han-hee as Mr. Choi's wife
- Oh Joo-hee as Mr. Lee's wife
- Kim Yong-seon as Mr. Yoon's wife
- Lee Yong-nyeo as Mr. Kim's wife
- Yang Ik-june as Student boarder 1
- Im Yong-jae as Student Boarder 2
- Lee Jun-sik as Redevelopment site employee
- Han Gyu-nam as Young man
- Shim Hye-gyu as Single bodhisattva
- Geum Dong-hyeon as Pharmacist
- Lee Eung-jae as Male customer at noraebang
- Jang Gyeong-jin as Female customer at noraebang

== Awards and nominations ==
| Year | Award | Category | Recipient | Result |
|---|---|---|---|---|
| 2008 | 45th Grand Bell Awards | Best Actress | Kim Hae-sook | Nominated |
| 2008 | 45th Grand Bell Awards | Best Supporting Actor | Gi Ju-bong | Nominated |
| 2008 | 45th Grand Bell Awards | Best New Director | Oh Joum-kyun | Won |
| 2008 | 45th Grand Bell Awards | Best New Actor | Kim Young-min | Nominated |
| 2008 | 45th Grand Bell Awards | Best New Actress | Kim Hye-na | Nominated |
| 2008 | 45th Grand Bell Awards | Best Screenplay | Park Yoon | Won |
| 2008 | 17th Buil Film Awards | Best Actress | Kim Hae-sook | Nominated |
| 2008 | 17th Buil Film Awards | Best Supporting Actor | Gi Ju-bong | Nominated |
| 2008 | 17th Buil Film Awards | Best New Director | Oh Joum-kyun | Won |
| 2008 | 9th Busan Film Critics Awards | Best New Director | Oh Joum-kyun | Won |
| 2008 | 29th Blue Dragon Film Awards | Best New Director | Oh Joum-kyun | Nominated |
| 2008 | 7th Korean Film Awards | Best Actress | Kim Hae-sook | Nominated |
| 2008 | 7th Korean Film Awards | Best New Director | Oh Joum-kyun | Nominated |
| 2009 | 45th Baeksang Arts Awards | Best Film | Viva! Love | Won |
| 2009 | 45th Baeksang Arts Awards | Best Actress (Film) | Kim Hae-sook | Nominated |
| 2009 | 45th Baeksang Arts Awards | Best Screenplay (Film) | Park Yoon | Nominated |
