= Seven Days (2007 film) =

- Theatrical release poster
- Hangul: 세븐 데이즈
- RR: Sebeun deijeu
- MR: Sebŭn teijŭ
- Directed by: Won Shin-yun
- Written by: Yoon Jae-gu
- Produced by: Lee Seo-yeol; Im Choong-geun
- Starring: Yunjin Kim; Kim Mi-sook; Park Hee-soon
- Cinematography: Choi Young-hwan
- Edited by: Shin Min-kyung
- Music by: Kim Jun-seong
- Production companies: Prime Entertainment; Yoon & Joon Films
- Distributed by: Prime Entertainment
- Release date: November 14, 2007
- Running time: 125 minutes
- Country: South Korea
- Language: Korean
- Box office: US$14,391,750

Seven Days (Korean: 세븐 데이즈) is a 2007 South Korean crime thriller film directed by Won Shin-yun and starring Yunjin Kim.

The film had 2,107,849 admissions nationwide and was the 9th most-attended domestic film of 2007. In 2008, Kim won Best Actress at the Grand Bell Awards, and Park won Best Supporting Actor at the Blue Dragon Film Awards and Korean Film Awards.

The film was also been remade in Bollywood as the 2015 film Jazbaa.

== Plot ==
Yoo Ji-yeon (Yunjin Kim) is a prominent lawyer, who has yet to lose a case. While Ji-yeon is taking part in a parents-only race at her daughter's field day, her daughter disappears.

Later in the day, Ji-yeon receives a phone call from the man who abducted her daughter. The man makes it clear that he is not interested in her money. Rather, he tells her that the only way she will ever see her daughter again is to defend a five-time convicted felon who is appealing his conviction for rape and murder. Ji-yeon has only seven days before his trial ends.

== Cast ==
- Yunjin Kim as Yoo Ji-yeon, a lawyer and mother
- Kim Mi-sook as Han Sook-hee, a professor of psychology
- Park Hee-soon as Kim Seong-yeol, a police detective
- Choi Moo-sung as Jeong Cheol-jin
- Jang Hang-sun
- Seo Dong-soo as Dr. Jo
- Shin Hyeon-jong as Mr. Oh
- Kwon Byeong-gil as Park Ki-bok
- Yang Jin-woo as Kang Ji-won, a rock singer
- Jung Dong-hwan as Kang Sang-man
- Lee Jeong-heon as a public prosecutor
- Oh Kwang-rok as Yang Chang-goo

== Awards and nominations ==
| Award | Category | Recipient(s) | Result | Ref(s) |
|---|---|---|---|---|
| 2nd Asian Film Awards | Best Actress | Yunjin Kim | Nominated | |
| 44th Baeksang Arts Awards | Best Actress | Yunjin Kim | Nominated | |
| 9th Busan Film Critics Awards | Best Supporting Actor | Park Hee-soon | Won | |
| 4th University Film Festival of Korea | Best Supporting Actor | Park Hee-soon | Won | |
| 17th Buil Film Awards | Best Supporting Actor | Park Hee-soon | Nominated | |
| 17th Buil Film Awards | Best Editing | Shin Min-kyung | Nominated | |
| 17th Buil Film Awards | Technical Award | Lee Chang-man | Nominated | |
| 45th Grand Bell Awards | Best Film | Seven Days | Nominated | |
| 45th Grand Bell Awards | Best Director | Won Shin-yun | Nominated | |
| 45th Grand Bell Awards | Best Actress | Yunjin Kim | Won | |
| 45th Grand Bell Awards | Best Screenplay | Yoon Jae-gu | Nominated | |
| 45th Grand Bell Awards | Best Cinematography | Choi Young-hwan | Nominated | |
| 45th Grand Bell Awards | Best Lighting | Kim Sung-kwan | Nominated | |
| 45th Grand Bell Awards | Best Editing | Shin Min-kyung | Won | |
| 45th Grand Bell Awards | Best Music | Kim Jun-seong | Nominated | |
| 45th Grand Bell Awards | Best Sound Effects | Lee Seung-chul, Lee Eun-ju | Won | |
| 45th Grand Bell Awards | Best Visual Effects | Jeon Geon-ik | Nominated | |
| 29th Blue Dragon Film Awards | Best Film | Seven Days | Nominated | |
| 29th Blue Dragon Film Awards | Best Director | Won Shin-yun | Nominated | |
| 29th Blue Dragon Film Awards | Best Leading Actress | Yunjin Kim | Nominated | |
| 29th Blue Dragon Film Awards | Best Supporting Actor | Park Hee-soon | Won | |
| 29th Blue Dragon Film Awards | Best Supporting Actress | Kim Mi-sook | Nominated | |
| 29th Blue Dragon Film Awards | Best Screenplay | Yoon Jae-gu | Nominated | |
| 29th Blue Dragon Film Awards | Technical Award | Shin Min-kyung | Nominated | |
| 7th Korean Film Awards | Best Actress | Yunjin Kim | Nominated | |
| 7th Korean Film Awards | Best Supporting Actor | Park Hee-soon | Won | |
| 7th Korean Film Awards | Best Supporting Actress | Kim Mi-sook | Nominated | |
| 7th Korean Film Awards | Best Screenplay | Yoon Jae-gu | Nominated | |
| 7th Korean Film Awards | Best Cinematography | Choi Young-hwan | Nominated | |
| 7th Korean Film Awards | Best Editing | Shin Min-kyung | Nominated | |
| 7th Korean Film Awards | Best Sound | Lee Seung-chul, Lee Seong-jin | Nominated | |
| 5th Max Movie Awards | Best Actress | Yunjin Kim | Won | |

== Remake ==
A Bollywood remake titled Jazbaa (lit. "Passion") starring Aishwarya Rai and Irrfan Khan was released on October 9, 2015.
