= Wild Card (2003 film) =

- Film poster
- Directed by: Kim Yoo-jin
- Written by: Lee Man-hee; Shin Geun-ho
- Produced by: Chang Yoon-hyun; Kim Yoo-jin
- Starring: Jung Jin-young; Yang Dong-geun; Han Chae-young
- Cinematography: Byun Hee-sung
- Edited by: Kim Hyeon
- Music by: Jo Seong-woo
- Production companies: C&Film; Yoojin E & C
- Distributed by: Cinema Service
- Release date: May 16, 2003
- Running time: 114 minutes
- Country: South Korea
- Language: Korean

Wild Card (Korean: 와일드 카드) is a 2003 South Korean film directed by Kim Yoo-jin. The crime drama received mixed reviews.

== Premise ==
Veteran detective Oh Young-dal and his younger, loose-cannon partner Bang Jae-su are investigating the serial's rape-murders of young women in Seoul. They begin to close in on gang leader Kim Min-ki, a psychopath who carries a metal ball and chain.

== Cast ==
- Jung Jin-young as Oh Young-dal
- Yang Dong-geun as Bang Je-su
- Han Chae-young as Kang Na-na
- Gi Ju-bong as Squad leader Kim
- Kim Myeong-gook as Jang Chil-sun
- Hwang Jun-yeong as Go Myeong-hwan
- Yu Ha-bok as Hwang Cheol-gu
- Bang Guk-hyeon as Shim Young-man
- Lee Dong-kyu as Noh Jae-bong
- Seo Jae-kyeong as Kim Min-ki
- Kim Gi-se as Wang Su-chang
- Kim Chang-gyu as Go Du-man
- Lee Do-kyeong as Do Sang-chun
- Jo Kyung-hoon as Gomtaeng-i
- Chae Min-seok as Gal-chi
- Shin Jung-geun as Neob-chi ("Halibut")
- Lee Dol-hyung as Sun-dae ("Blood sausage")
- Yang Han-seok as Kang Il-man
- Shin Kyeong-ah as Kang Suk
- Lee Jeong-in as Shin Suk-jeong
- Baek Shin as Detective Kim
- Han Seong-sik as Delivery guy of Chinese restaurant
- Cha Soon-bae

== Reception ==
Wild Card received mixed reviews.

Derek Elley, writing for Variety, states that although there is "nothing new" about the premise or plot, the film has "well-written and well-played characters whose ensemble chemistry pays off in the final reels." Andrew Robertson, from Eye For Film, called the film "exciting" with an "almost Seventies feel."
