= Night and Day (2008 film) =

- Theatrical poster
- Hangul: 밤과 낮
- RR: Bamgwa nat
- MR: Pamgwa nat
- Directed by: Hong Sang-soo
- Written by: Hong Sang-soo
- Produced by: Kang Dong-goo; Kim Yeong-deok; Oh Jeong-wan; Jo Kwang-hee
- Starring: Kim Young-ho; Park Eun-hye; Hwang Soo-jung
- Narrated by: Kim Yeong-ho
- Cinematography: Kim Hoon-kwang
- Edited by: Hahm Seong-won
- Music by: Jeong Yong-jin
- Production company: Bom Films
- Distributed by: Sponge Entertainment
- Release dates: 12 February 2008 (Berlinale); 28 February 2008
- Running time: 144 minutes
- Country: South Korea
- Language: Korean
- Box office: $208,859

Night and Day (Korean: 밤과 낮) is a 2008 South Korean comedy-drama film written and directed by Hong Sang-soo, starring Kim Young-ho and Park Eun-hye. The film competed for the Golden Bear at the 58th Berlin International Film Festival.

== Storyline ==
In the summer of 2007, Kim Seong-nam, a painter in his forties, travels to Paris, France, to escape arrest for smoking marijuana, leaving his wife behind in Korea. While there he meets an ex-girlfriend, Min-seon, and is introduced to a small community of Korean artists.

== Cast ==
- Kim Young-ho as Kim Seong-nam, a painter
- Park Eun-hye as Lee Yoo-jeong, a student in painting major at the ENSB-A
- Hwang Soo-jung as Han Seong-in, Seong-nam's wife
- Gi Ju-bong as Mr. Jang, a host of the guest house
- Kim Yoo-jin as Jang Min-seon, Seong-nam's ex-girlfriend
- Seo Min-jeong as Jo Hyeon-joo, Yoo-jeong's roommate
- Jeong Ji-hye as Jeong Ji-hye, Yoo-jeong's college junior
- Lee Sun-kyun as Yoon Kyeong-soo, a student from North Korea
- Lee Jeong-hoon as Teacher Jang

== Release ==
Night and Day premiered at the 58th Berlin International Film Festival on 12 February 2008. It was released in South Korean theatres on 28 February, and as of 13 July had received a total of 13,928 admissions with a gross of $75,557.

== Awards and nominations ==
Night and Day won the award for Best Film at the 17th Buil Film Awards, held on 9 October 2008. Hong was nominated for Best Screenplay at the 2008 Asia Pacific Screen Awards.
