= Na Hong-jin =

South Korean filmmaker (born 1974)

- 나홍진
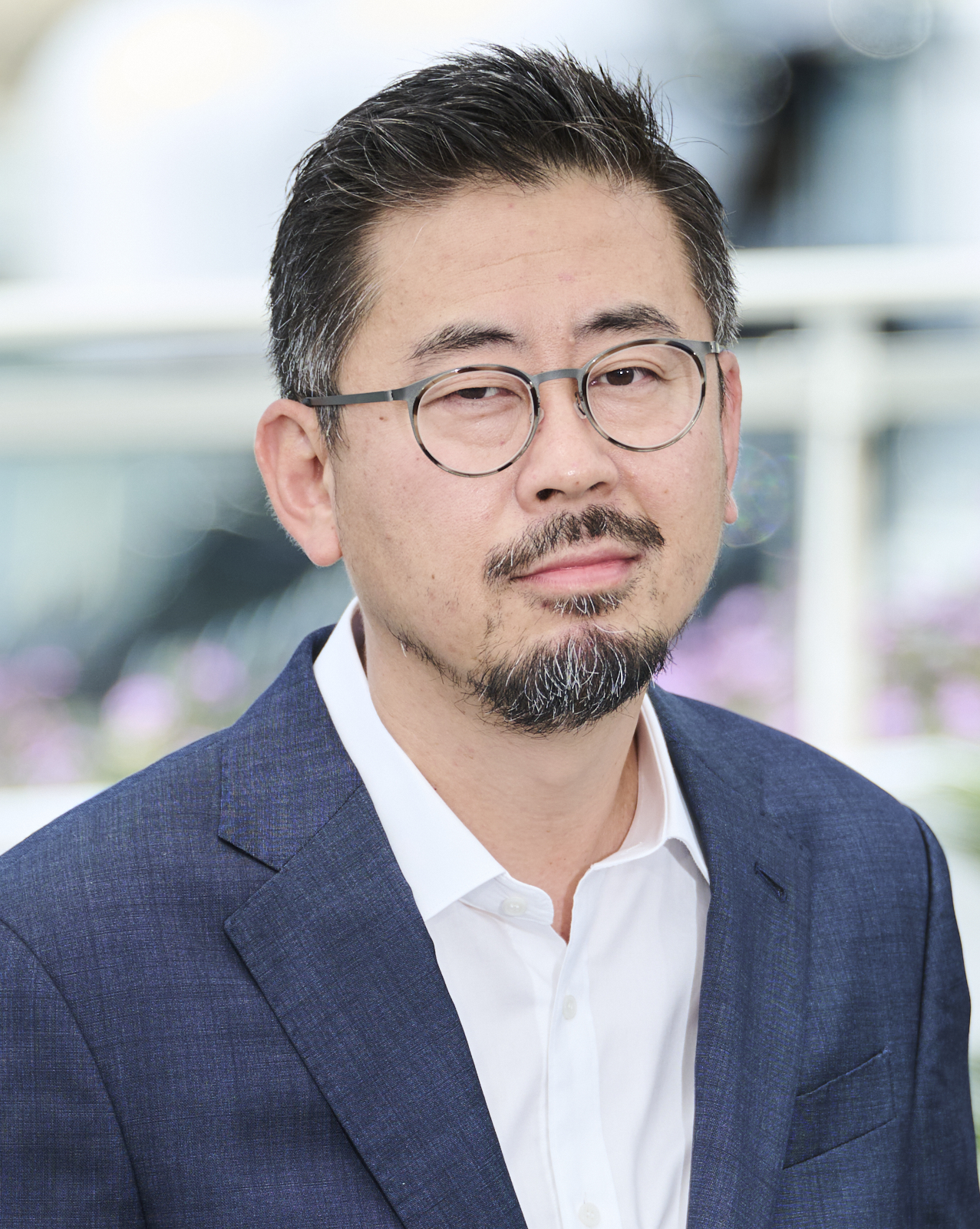
- Na in 2026
- Born: 20 July 1974 (age 52); Seoul, South Korea
- Education: Korea National University of Arts
- Occupations: Film director; screenwriter; film producer
- Years active: 2003–present

Korean name
- Hangul: 나홍진
- Hanja: 羅泓軫
- RR: Na Hongjin
- MR: Na Hongjin

Na Hong-jin (Korean: 나홍진, born 20 July 1974) is a South Korean filmmaker. His films are characterized by the incorporation of violent thriller and horror elements.

Na's emergence in the film industry began with his feature film debut, The Chaser (2008), which achieved both critical and commercial success, ranking as the third-highest-grossing film in South Korea for its release year. His subsequent film, The Yellow Sea (2010), was presented in the Un Certain Regard section at the 2011 Cannes Film Festival. The Wailing (2016) further contributed to Na's critical and commercial standing, earning accolades that included the Best Director award at the 37th Blue Dragon Film Awards and recognition at the Bucheon International Film Festival. Na's fourth film, Hope (2026), was screened at the main competition section of the 2026 Cannes Film Festival.

== Early life ==
Na Hong-jin was born on 20 July 1974 in Seoul, South Korea. He graduated from Hanyang University ERICA Campus Department of Crafts studying industrial arts and, at first, started in the advertisement industry, until he decided to pursue his dream as a filmmaker. He then enrolled in Korea National University of Arts.

== Career ==
=== Early work ===
Na began making short films before he would go on to make his large feature films. Na's debut short film was titled 5 Minutes (2003). It was until his second short film, A Perfect Red Snapper Dish (2005), that Na started to gain recognition. Na won best film in The Extreme Nightmare section at the Mise-en-scène Short Film Festival. He would then go on to make his third short film, Sweat (2007) that would win the best short film director prize at the Grand Bell Awards and jury prize at the Bucheon International Film Festival awards.

=== Feature films ===
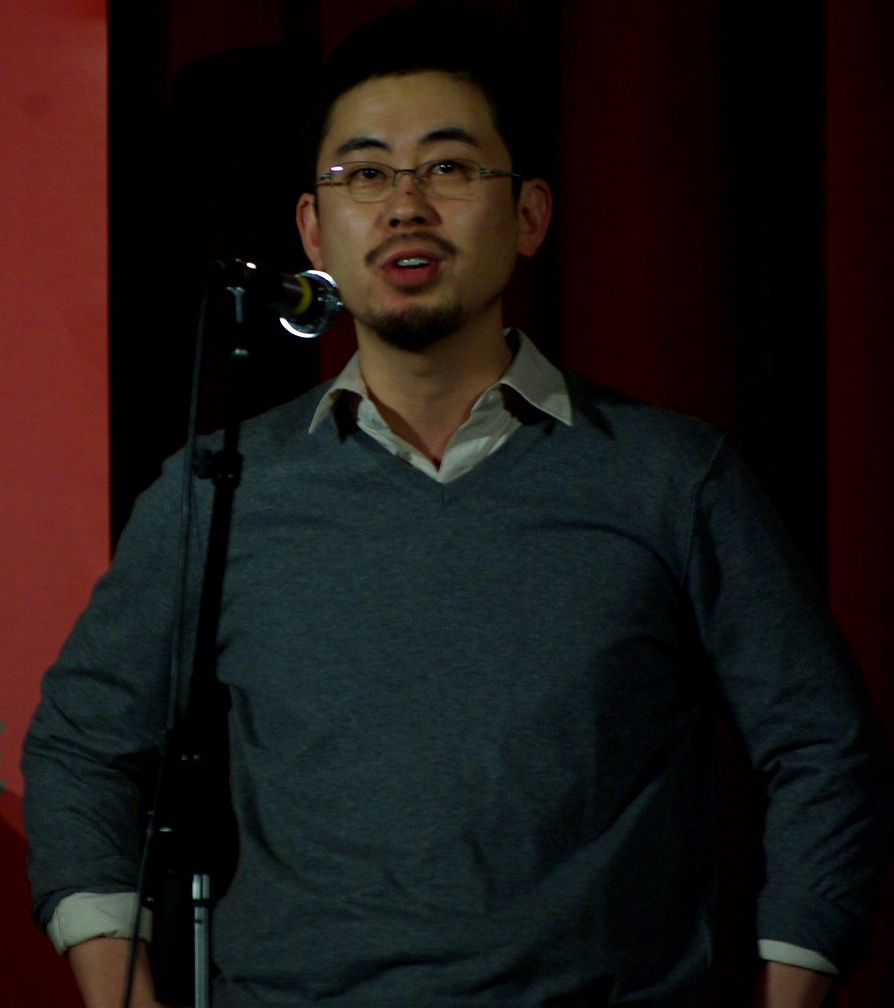
Na in 2009

Na's debut feature film was titled The Chaser (2008), which was met with critical acclaim as well as commercial success. The Chaser became one of the most watched films in Korea, peaking at the third highest grossing film of 2008. The film was also screened at the Cannes Film Festival where reviewers hailed it as an "instant classic" in Korean thrillers. The film took home many awards such as the 16th Chunsa Film Art Awards for Best Director and Best Screenplay.

The Yellow Sea (2010) was released and entailed a more ambitious vision from Na. The Yellow Sea became the first Korean film to ever have a Hollywood studio collaboration, with the 20th Century Fox studio. Na's second film achieved positive reviews but "lacking" compared to The Chaser. The film was screened under the Un Certain Regard section at the 2011 Cannes Film Festival and received positive critical reviews on Metacritic.

Na's critically acclaimed third feature film, The Wailing (2016). The film encompasses a deep weave of many themes such as religion, perception, comedy, and horror. The Wailing succeeded commercially and critically, again winning Na many film wards such as Best Director at the 37th Blue Dragon Film Awards, Best of Bucheon award at the Bucheon international fantastic film festival, the top film of the year of the 36th Korean Association of Film Critics Awards, and many more. The film premiered at the Cannes Film Festival and was shortly released onto streaming services.

Na co-wrote and produced Thai director Banjong Pisanthanakun's supernatural horror film The Medium. It premiered at the 25th Bucheon international fantastic film festival on 11 July 2021. When writing the story, Na explained in an interview that The Medium was initially a sequel to The Wailing with Hwang Jung-min's shaman character. However, this rendition did not come to light. As quoted by Na himself, "The Medium has no relation to The Wailing."

In 2025, Na served as the president of the Competition jury at the 30th Busan International Film Festival.

His fourth feature film, Hope (2026), started production in 2023, and spent nearly three years in post-production. It had its world premiere at the main competition of the 2026 Cannes Film Festival.

== Filmography ==
=== Feature film ===
Year	Title	Director	Writer	Producer	Ref.
2008	The Chaser	Yes	Yes	No	
2010	The Yellow Sea	Yes	Yes	No	
2016	The Wailing	Yes	Yes	No	
2021	The Medium	No	Yes	Yes	
2026	Hope	Yes	Yes	Yes	

=== Short film ===
Year	Title	Credited as			Notes
Year	Title	Director	Screenplay	Producer	Notes
2004	River Side	No	No	No	as cinematographer, editor, storyboard
2005	A Perfect Red Snapper Dish	Yes	Yes	No	also sound
2007	Sweat	Yes	Yes	Yes	also editor
2007	Carnival	No	No	No	Cameo (Food stall owner)
2023	Faith	Yes	Yes	Yes	

== Awards and nominations ==
Year	Award	Category	Nominated work	Result	Ref.
2005	The 6th Korea Video Contest	Encouragement Award	5 Minutes	Won	
2005	The 4th Mise-en-scène Short Film Festival	Absolute Nightmare Best Film Award	A Perfect Red Snapper Dish	Won	
2007	11th Bucheon International Fantastic Film Festival	Jury Prize	A Perfect Red Snapper Dish	Won	
2007	8th Respest Digital Film Festival	Audience Award	A Perfect Red Snapper Dish	Won	
2007	8th Korea Video Contest	Excellence Award	A Perfect Red Snapper Dish	Won	
2007	44th Grand Bell Awards	Best Short Film Director	A Perfect Red Snapper Dish	Won	
2008	Los Angeles Asian Pacific Film Festival	New Visions Award (New Director)	Han	Won	
2008	61st Cannes Film Festival	Caméra d'Or	The Chaser	Nominated	
2008	44th Baeksang Arts Awards	Grand Prize (Daesang)	The Chaser	Won	
2008	44th Baeksang Arts Awards	Best Film	The Chaser	Nominated	
2008	44th Baeksang Arts Awards	Best Director	The Chaser	Nominated	
2008	44th Baeksang Arts Awards	Best New Director	The Chaser	Won	
2008	44th Baeksang Arts Awards	Best Screenplay (Note: Team: Na Hong-jin and Shinho Lee)	The Chaser	Nominated	
2008	16th Chunsa Film Art Awards	Best New Director	The Chaser	Won	
2008	16th Chunsa Film Art Awards	Best Screenplay	The Chaser	Won	
2008	9th Busan Film Critics Awards	Best Screenplay	The Chaser	Won	
2008	17th Buil Film Awards	Best Film	The Chaser	Nominated	
2008	17th Buil Film Awards	Best Director	The Chaser	Won	
2008	17th Buil Film Awards	Best New Director	The Chaser	Nominated	
2008	17th Buil Film Awards	Best Screenplay	The Chaser	Nominated	
2008	17th Buil Film Awards	Buil Readers' Jury Award	The Chaser	Won	
2008	45th Grand Bell Awards	Best Film	The Chaser	Won	
2008	45th Grand Bell Awards	Best Director	The Chaser	Won	
2008	45th Grand Bell Awards	Best New Director	The Chaser	Nominated	
2008	45th Grand Bell Awards	Best Screenplay	The Chaser	Nominated	
2008	29th Blue Dragon Film Awards	Best Film	The Chaser	Nominated	
2008	29th Blue Dragon Film Awards	Best Screenplay	The Chaser	Nominated	
2008	7th Korean Film Awards	Best Film	The Chaser	Won	
2008	7th Korean Film Awards	Best Director	The Chaser	Won	
2008	7th Korean Film Awards	Best New Director	The Chaser	Won	
2008	7th Korean Film Awards	Best Screenplay	The Chaser	Won	
2008	11th Director's Cut Awards	Best New Director	The Chaser	Won	
2008	Cine 21 Awards	Best New Director	The Chaser	Won	
2008	Cine 21 Awards	Best Screenplay	The Chaser	Won	
2008	12th Bucheon International Fantastic Film Festival	Best of Puchon	The Chaser	Won	
2008	12th Bucheon International Fantastic Film Festival	EFFFF Asian Award	The Chaser	Won	
2009	3rd Asian Film Awards	Best Screenplay	The Chaser	Nominated	
2009	Deauville Asian Film Festival	Lotus Action Asia Award	The Chaser	Won	
2011	48th Grand Bell Awards	Best Film	The Yellow Sea	Nominated	
2011	48th Grand Bell Awards	Best Director	The Yellow Sea	Nominated	
2011	47th Baeksang Arts Awards	Best Film	The Yellow Sea	Nominated	
2011	47th Baeksang Arts Awards	Best Director	The Yellow Sea	Nominated	
2011	5th Asian Film Awards	Best Director	The Yellow Sea	Nominated	
2011	5th Asia Pacific Screen Awards	Achievement in Directing	The Yellow Sea	Nominated	
2011	64th Cannes Film Festival	Un Certain Regard	The Yellow Sea	Nominated	
2011	15th Puchon International Fantastic Film Festival	Best Director	The Yellow Sea	Won	
2011	15th Puchon International Fantastic Film Festival	Best of Puchon	The Yellow Sea	Nominated	
2011	Chicago International Film Festival	Gold Hugo	The Yellow Sea	Nominated	
2016	25th Buil Film Awards	Best Film	The Wailing	Nominated	
2016	25th Buil Film Awards	Best Director	The Wailing	Nominated	
2016	37th Blue Dragon Film Awards	Best Film	The Wailing	Nominated	
2016	37th Blue Dragon Film Awards	Best Director	The Wailing	Won	
2016	37th Blue Dragon Film Awards	Best Screenplay	The Wailing	Nominated	
2016	Bucheon International Fantastic Film Festival	Audience Award	The Wailing	Won	
2016	Bucheon International Fantastic Film Festival	Best of Bucheon Award	The Wailing	Won	
2016	16th Director's Cut Awards	Best Director	The Wailing	Won	
2016	Fantasia International Film Festival	Prix AQCC	The Wailing	Won	
2016	Fantasia International Film Festival	Audience Award for Best Asian Feature	The Wailing	3rd place	
2016	53rd Grand Bell Awards	Best Film	The Wailing	Nominated	
2016	53rd Grand Bell Awards	Best Director	The Wailing	Nominated	
2016	36th Korean Association of Film Critics Awards	Top Films of the Year	The Wailing	Won	
2016	Korean Film Actor's Association Awards	Top Director Award	The Wailing	Won	
2016	Korean Film Producers Association Awards	Best Director	The Wailing	Won	
2016	Phoenix Critics Circle	Best International Film	The Wailing	Nominated	
2016	Sitges Film Festival	Focus Asia Award	The Wailing	Won	
2016	BloodGuts UK Horror Awards	Best International Film	The Wailing	Nominated	
2016	BloodGuts UK Horror Awards	Best Director	The Wailing	Nominated	
2016	Molins de Rei Horror Film Festival	Best Film	The Wailing	Nominated	
2016	Saskatoon Fantastic Film Festival	Honourable Mention	The Wailing	Won	
2016	CPH:PIX	Politiken's Audience Award	The Wailing	Nominated	
2017	11th Asian Film Awards	Best Film	The Wailing	Nominated	
2017	11th Asian Film Awards	Best Director	The Wailing	Won	
2017	Central Ohio Film Critics Association Awards	Best Foreign Language Film	The Wailing	Nominated	
2017	8th KOFRA Film Awards	Best Film	The Wailing	Won	
2017	8th KOFRA Film Awards	Best Director	The Wailing	Won	
2017	Seattle Film Critics Awards	Best Foreign Language Film	The Wailing	Nominated	
2017	Korea Cable TV Awards	Cable VOD Grand Prize (Film)	The Wailing	Won	
2017	Fangoria Chainsaw Awards	Best Foreign-Language Film	The Wailing	Nominated	
2017	53rd Baeksang Arts Awards	Best Film	The Wailing	Won	
2017	53rd Baeksang Arts Awards	Best Director	The Wailing	Nominated	
2017	53rd Baeksang Arts Awards	Best Screenplay	The Wailing	Nominated	
2017	22nd Chunsa Film Awards	Best Director	The Wailing	Won	
2017	22nd Chunsa Film Awards	Best Screenplay	The Wailing	Nominated	
2017	Academy of Science Fiction, Fantasy and Horror Films	Best DVD/Blu-Ray Release	The Wailing	Nominated	
2017	iHorror Awards	Best Foreign Horror	The Wailing	Nominated	
2021	Bucheon Choice Features	Best Film	The Medium	Won	
2021	Maniatic Fantastic Film Festival	Best Film	The Medium	Won	
2021	San Sebastian Horror and Fantasy Film Week	Best Film	The Medium	Won	
2026	47th Blue Dragon Film Awards	Best Film	Hope	Pending	
2026	47th Blue Dragon Film Awards	Best Director	Hope	Pending	
2026	35th Buil Film Awards	Best Film	Hope	Nominated	
2026	35th Buil Film Awards	Best Director	Hope	Won	
2026	Cannes Film Festival	Palme d'Or	Hope	Nominated	
2026	Korean Association of Film Critics Awards	Best Director	Hope	Won	
2026	Marie Claire Asia Star Awards	Director of the Year	Hope	Won	
2026	New York Asian Film Festival	Daniel A. Craft Award for Excellence in Action Cinema	Hope	Won	
2026	59th Sitges Film Festival	Time Machine Award	In recognition of the lifetime achievement and having a special relationship with the fantastic genre.	Honored	

== Listicles ==
Name of publisher, year listed, name of listicle, and placement
Publisher	Year	Listicle	Placement	Ref.
Variety	2026	Horror Impact Report	Included	
The Hollywood Reporter	2026	30 Most Influential Genre Filmmakers	Included	
