= M (2007 film) =

- Theatrical poster
- Hangul: 엠
- RR: Em
- MR: Em
- Directed by: Lee Myung-se
- Written by: Lee Myung-se; Lee Hae-kyeong; Jo Jin-guk
- Produced by: Oh Su-mi
- Starring: Gang Dong-won; Lee Yeon-hee; Gong Hyo-jin
- Cinematography: Hong Kyung-pyo
- Edited by: Ko Im-pyo
- Music by: Jo Seong-woo; Choe Yong-rak
- Production company: Production M
- Distributed by: Chungeoram Film
- Release date: October 25, 2007 (South Korea)
- Running time: 109 minutes
- Country: South Korea
- Language: Korean
- Box office: US$2,929,249

M (Korean: 엠) is a 2007 South Korean psychological drama film starring Gang Dong-won, Lee Yeon-hee and Gong Hyo-jin. The film premiered at the Toronto International Film Festival, and the final cut had its Korean premiere at the Pusan International Film Festival.

Using visual effects, complex dream sequences, and gliding camerawork, director Lee Myung-se describes his film as "a dark labyrinth of dream and reality," and that instead of using computer graphics, he prefers to "capture the fantasy elements through lighting and emotions."

== Plot ==
A prominent up-and-coming author Min-woo readies his new much anticipated follow-up novel while suffering from writer's block, as well as frequent nightmares and hallucinations. This unexplainable condition affects both his personal and professional life. Soon he can't differentiate reality from fantasy and continues to have feelings of being chased. His paranoia leads him to a café in a dark, unassuming alley and encounters a charming young woman named Mimi. Min-woo starts to wonder how he and this girl in front of him are connected and traces long-forgotten memories of his first love.

== Cast ==
- Gang Dong-won as Min-woo
- Lee Yeon-hee as Mimi
- Gong Hyo-jin as Eun-hye
- Jeon Moo-song as bartender
- Song Young-chang as Company president Jang
- Im Won-hee as Sung-woo
- Lim Ju-hwan as umbrella man
- Seo Dong-soo as editor
- Jung In-gi as doctor
- Kim Dong-hwa
- Yoon Ga-hyun as groom's sister
- Jung Sun-hye
- Choi Dae-sung as Min-woo's friend

== Awards and nominations ==
2007 Korean Film Awards

- Best Cinematography – Hong Kyung-pyo
- Best Art Direction – Yoon Sang-yoon, Yoo Joo-ho
- Nomination – Best Film
- Nomination – Best Director – Lee Myung-se
- Nomination – Best Editing – Ko Im-pyo
- Nomination – Best Visual Effects – Jang Seong-ho
- Nomination – Best New Actress – Lee Yeon-hee

2008 Baeksang Arts Awards

- Nomination – Best Director – Lee Myung-se
- Nomination – Best New Actress – Lee Yeon-hee

2008 Buil Film Awards

- Best Art Direction – Yoon Sang-yoon, Yoo Joo-ho
- Best Lighting – Choi Chul-soo
- Nomination – Best Supporting Actress – Gong Hyo-jin
- Nomination – Best Cinematography – Hong Kyung-pyo

2008 Grand Bell Awards

- Best Art Direction – Yoon Sang-yoon, Yoo Joo-ho
- Nomination – Best Editing – Ko Im-pyo
- Nomination – Best Visual Effects – Jeong Do-an, Yu Yeong-jae
- Nomination – Best Sound – Park Jun-oh

2008 Blue Dragon Film Awards

- Nomination – Best Cinematography – Hong Kyung-pyo
- Nomination – Best Art Direction – Yoon Sang-yoon, Yoo Joo-ho
- Nomination – Best Lighting – Choi Chul-soo

== Adaptation ==
Mimi, a four-episode miniseries inspired by the film, aired on Mnet in 2014.
