= The Happy Life =

- Film poster
- Hangul: 즐거운 인생
- Hanja: 즐거운人生
- RR: Jeulgeoun insaeng
- MR: Chŭlgŏun insaeng
- Directed by: Lee Joon-ik
- Written by: Choi Seok-hwan
- Produced by: Jo Cheol-Hyeon
- Starring: Jung Jin-young; Kim Yoon-seok; Kim Sang-ho; Jang Keun-suk
- Cinematography: Kim Yeong-chul
- Edited by: Kim Sang-bum; Kim Jae-bum
- Music by: Bang Jun-seok; Lee Byung-hoon
- Distributed by: CJ Entertainment
- Release date: September 12, 2007
- Running time: 112 minutes
- Country: South Korea
- Language: Korean
- Box office: US$8.7 million

The Happy Life (Korean: 즐거운 인생) is a 2007 South Korean film directed by Lee Joon-ik. The film sold 1,263,835 tickets nationwide .

== Synopsis ==
Sang-woo, the leader of college rock band Active Volcano, dies and sets up a reunion for Gi-yeong and the other members of the group. Former bass player Seong-wook lives a hand-to-mouth existence working two jobs. Drummer Hyeok-su is a single father struggling to make a living as a car salesman. The jobless lead guitarist Gi-yeong dreams of taking over Volcano as the new frontman. When he suggests they reform the band while the old friends reminisce at the funeral, they all spurn the idea. But Gi-yeong persists and gets each to relent, setting the stage for a rock and roll reunion.

== Cast ==
- Jung Jin-young
- Kim Yoon-seok
- Kim Sang-ho as Hyuk-soo
- Jang Keun-suk
- Go Ah-sung
- Kim Ho-jung
- Chu Kwi-jung

== Musical theatre adaptation ==
It was adapted into a stage musical in 2008, with film/theater actor Oh Man-seok debuting as director. Oh was also the lyricist and polished the script. The story centers around two guys who are crazy about music. One is a high school music teacher, Beom-jin, who has broken up with his girlfriend and now eats sadly alone in front of his mirror out of habit. Another is the younger Sae-ki, whose mother left and whose father died in a sudden accident, leaving him an orphan. In this rather dull world, the only thing that makes these two feel alive is music, offering them their "happy life". Yoo Jun-sang and Im Choon-gil alternated as Beom-jin, and Kim Mu-yeol and Ryan alternated as Sae-ki.

== Awards and nominations ==
Year	Award	Category	Nominated work	Result	Ref.
2007	10th Director's Cut Awards	Best New Actor	Jang Keun-suk	Won	
2007	28th Blue Dragon Film Awards	Best Supporting Actor	Kim Sang-ho	Won	
2007	28th Blue Dragon Film Awards	Best Music	Bang Jun-seok; Lee Byung-hoon	Won	
2007	28th Blue Dragon Film Awards	Best New Actor	Jang Keun-suk	Nominated	
2007	6th Korean Film Awards	Best New Actor	Jang Keun-suk	Nominated	
2008	44th Baeksang Arts Awards	Best New Actor (Film)	Jang Keun-suk	Won	
2008	17th Buil Film Awards	Best New Actor	Jang Keun-suk	Nominated	
2008	45th Grand Bell Awards	Best Film	The Happy Life	Nominated	
2008	45th Grand Bell Awards	Best Director	Lee Joon-ik	Nominated	
2008	45th Grand Bell Awards	Best New Actor	Jang Keun-suk	Nominated	
2008	45th Grand Bell Awards	Best Editing	Kim Jae-beom; Kim Sang-beom	Nominated	
2008	45th Grand Bell Awards	Best Music	Bang Jun-seok; Lee Byung-hoon	Nominated	
2008	45th Grand Bell Awards	Best Sound Effects	Bang Jun-seok; Lee Byung-hoon	Nominated	
2008	45th Grand Bell Awards	Best Planning	Choi Seok-hwan	Nominated	
