= Forever the Moment =

- Theatrical release poster
- Hangul: 우리 생애 최고의 순간
- Hanja: 우리 生涯 最高의 瞬間
- RR: Uri saengae choegoui sungan
- MR: Uri saengae ch'oegoŭi sun'gan
- Directed by: Yim Soon-rye
- Written by: Na Hyun
- Produced by: Shim Jae-myung; Kim Hyeon-cheol; Kim Kyun-hee
- Starring: Kim Jung-eun; Moon So-ri; Uhm Tae-woong; Kim Ji-young; Jo Eun-ji
- Cinematography: Hwang Ki-seok
- Edited by: Moon In-dae
- Music by: Yoon Min-hwa
- Production companies: Myung Films; MK Pictures; KD Media; Pancinema; OCN
- Distributed by: Sidus FNH
- Release date: January 10, 2008 (South Korea)
- Running time: 124 minutes
- Country: South Korea
- Language: Korean
- Box office: US$27.3 million

Forever the Moment (Korean: 우리 생애 최고의 순간) is a 2008 South Korean sports drama film directed by Yim Soon-rye and written by Na Hyun. It is a fictionalized account of the South Korean women's handball team which competed in the 2004 Summer Olympics. The Korean title translates as "The Best Moment in Our Lives," and it is believed to be the first film that revolves around the sport of handball.

== Plot ==
Kim Hye-kyeong is a retired handball player who has been successfully coaching in the Japan Handball League. When the coach of South Korea's women's national team suddenly quits, she is asked to fill in but is faced with an undisciplined squad of players. Hye-kyeong tries to improve the team by recruiting some of her old teammates, including two-time Olympic gold medalist Han Mi-sook. However, Hye-kyeong's aggressiveness causes friction amongst the players, and she is replaced by former men's handball star Ahn Seung-pil, though she decides to stay with the team as a player. Seung-pil introduces modern European training methods which bring him into conflict with the older players, and things get worse when they lose a game against a high school boys' team.

== Cast ==
- Kim Jung-eun as Kim Hye-kyeong
- Moon So-ri as Han Mi-sook
- Uhm Tae-woong as Ahn Seung-pil
- Kim Ji-young as Song Jeong-ran
- Jo Eun-ji as Oh Soo-hee
- Cha Min-ji as Jang Bo-ram
- Namgoong Eun-sook as Jin-joo
- Lee Mi-do as Hyeon-ja
- Jo Yeong-jin as Director Song
- Lee Bong-gyoo as Chairman
- Jeong Seok-yong as Choong-sik, the office chief
- Ha Jung-woo as Blind date man
- Choi Wook as Coach Kang
- Jeong Se-hyeong as Trainer Jeong
- Kim Kang-mi as Dong-yoon
- Kim Jong-eon as Kim Goon
- Park Hyeong-jae as Myeong-seok
- Jo Deok-jae as Boss Bae
- Oh Chang-kyeong as Sang-yeol
- Kim Do-yeon as Jong-mi
- Woo Yong as Nutritionist
- Na Hyun as Director Hakiboo
- Kim Jin-hyeok as Real estate poker man
- Sung Ji-ru as Jin-gook, Jeong-ran's husband (cameo)
- Park Won-sang as Gyu-cheol, Mi-sook's husband (cameo)
- Ryu Seung-soo as Supermarket manager (cameo)

Danish and French team

- The Danish and French team players were played by real players from Danish women's handball club SK Aarhus.
- Miles Meili as Danish coach 1
- Tore Hogas as Danish coach 2
- Martin Lord Cayce as French coach
- Iwona Niedźwiedź-Cecotka as French player #3 (V. Pons)
- Mária Tóth as French player #20 (A. Olivier)

== Background ==
South Korea won the silver medal in women's handball at the 2004 Summer Olympics, following a close game against Denmark that was decided by a penalty shootout. The Koreans had lost a three-point lead in the second half, and at the end of normal time both sides were level at 25–25, taking the game into overtime. After the first overtime the score was still locked at 29–29, but South Korea was leading 34–33 in the second overtime until a late equaliser by Katrine Fruelund in the final ten seconds forced the game into a shootout, which Denmark won 4–2. In a poll conducted by Gallup Korea, 50.2% of respondents said that the women's handball finals was their favourite event of the 2004 Summer Olympics.

== Reception ==
Forever the Moment was released in South Korea on January 10, 2008. It topped the box office on its opening weekend, grossing $4,407,643, and remained at the top for a further two weeks, ahead of Hollywood films Enchanted, Sweeney Todd: The Demon Barber of Fleet Street, and Cloverfield, all released during the same period. By March 23 the film had grossed a total of $27,258,370, and as of July 13 the total number of admissions was 4,043,293.

== Awards and nominations ==
| Award | Category | Recipient | Result |
|---|---|---|---|
| 3rd Asian Film Awards | Best Supporting Actress | Kim Ji-young | Nominated |
| 44th Baeksang Arts Awards | Best Film | Forever the Moment | Won |
| 44th Baeksang Arts Awards | Best Director (film) | Yim Soon-rye | Nominated |
| 44th Baeksang Arts Awards | Best Actress (film) | Kim Jung-eun | Nominated |
| 44th Baeksang Arts Awards | Best Screenplay (film) | Na Hyun | Nominated |
| 44th Baeksang Arts Awards | Most Popular Actress (film) | Kim Jung-eun | Won |
| 29th Blue Dragon Film Awards | Best Film | Forever the Moment | Won |
| 29th Blue Dragon Film Awards | Best Director | Yim Soon-rye | Nominated |
| 29th Blue Dragon Film Awards | Best Actress | Moon So-ri | Nominated |
| 29th Blue Dragon Film Awards | Best Supporting Actor | Uhm Tae-woong | Nominated |
| 29th Blue Dragon Film Awards | Best Supporting Actress | Kim Ji-young | Won |
| 29th Blue Dragon Film Awards | Best Screenplay | Na Hyun | Nominated |
| 17th Buil Film Awards | Best Supporting Actress | Kim Ji-young | Nominated |
| 17th Buil Film Awards | Best Screenplay | Na Hyun | Nominated |
| 17th Buil Film Awards | Buil Readers' Jury Award | Forever the Moment | Nominated |
| 9th Busan Film Critics Awards | Best Supporting Actress | Kim Ji-young | Won |
| 9th Busan Film Critics Awards | Special Jury Prize | Yim Soon-rye | Won |
| 16th Chunsa Film Art Awards | Best Actress | Moon So-ri | Nominated |
| 16th Chunsa Film Art Awards | Best Supporting Actress | Kim Ji-young | Won |
| 16th Chunsa Film Art Awards | Best New Actress | Jo Eun-ji | Won |
| 45th Grand Bell Awards | Best Supporting Actress | Kim Ji-young | Nominated |
| 45th Grand Bell Awards | Best Editing | Moon In-dae | Nominated |
| 45th Grand Bell Awards | Best Planning | Shim Jae-myung, Kim Hyeon-cheol and Kim Kyun-hee | Nominated |
| 7th Korean Film Awards | Best Supporting Actress | Kim Ji-young | Won |
| 2008 Seoul International Women's Film Festival | Park Namok Award | Forever the Moment | Won |
| 2008 Women in Film Korea Festival | Woman in Film of the Year | Yim Soon-rye | Won |
| 2008 Women in Film Korea Festival | PR and Marketing Award | Forever the Moment | Won |
