= Na Hyeon =

South Korean screenwriter and film director

- Born: November 4, 1970 (age 55); Busan, South Korea
- Education: Dong-a University - Politics, Chung-Ang University - Multimedia and Film
- Occupations: Screenwriter; film director; script editor; actor

Korean name
- Hangul: 나현
- RR: Na Hyeon
- MR: Na Hyŏn

Na Hyeon (Korean: 나현, born 1970) is a South Korean screenwriter and film director.

== Career ==
A veteran screenwriter in the Korean film industry, Na made his directorial debut with the crime thriller The Prison (2017). Highly rated as an action genre film, its distribution rights were sold to 62 countries even before its release in local theatres.

== Filmography ==
=== As screenwriter ===
- Mokpo, Gangster's Paradise (2004)
- Spin Kick (2004)
- May 18 (2007)
- Forever the Moment (2008)
- Heartbreak Library (2008)
- Leafie, A Hen into the Wild (2011)
- My Way (2011)
- South Bound (2013)
- The Prison (2017)
- Yaksha: Ruthless Operations (2022)

=== As director ===
- I Don't Know You (short film, 2012)
- The Prison (2017)
- Yaksha: Ruthless Operations (2022)

=== As script editor ===
- Spin Kick (2004) - storyboard
- Summer Snow (2015)

=== As actor ===
- Spin Kick (2004)
- Forever the Moment (2008)
- Heartbreak Library (2008)
- The Room Nearby (2009)
- Fly, Penguin (2009)
- Re-Encounter (2010)
- Summer Snow (2015)
