= The Chaser (2008 film) =

2008 South Korean action thriller film

- Theatrical release poster
- Hangul: 추격자
- Hanja: 追擊者
- RR: Chugyeokja
- MR: Ch'ugyŏkcha
- Directed by: Na Hong-jin
- Written by: Na Hong-jin; Shinho Lee; Hong Won-chan
- Produced by: Kim Su-jin; Yun In-beom
- Starring: Kim Yoon-seok; Ha Jung-woo
- Cinematography: Lee Sung-jae
- Edited by: Kim Sun-min
- Music by: Kim Joon-seok; Choi Yong-rak
- Production companies: Big House; Finecut
- Distributed by: Showbox
- Release date: 14 February 2008
- Running time: 124 minutes
- Country: South Korea
- Language: Korean
- Box office: US$35.8 million

The Chaser (Korean: 추격자) is a 2008 South Korean action thriller film starring Kim Yoon-seok and Ha Jung-woo. It was directed by Na Hong-jin in his directorial debut. Inspired by real-life Korean serial killer Yoo Young-chul, certain scenes were shot on location around Mangwon-dong in the Mapo District, Seoul.

Labeling it a "thrilling and inventive action movie", American entertainment publication Collider has considered it one of the most disturbing South Korean films of all time.

== Plot ==
Joong-ho is a dishonest pimp and former police detective who is in financial trouble because two of his prostitutes have gone missing. One night, he commands Mi-jin to service a customer, despite her protests over her sickness. Joong-ho then realizes this customer was the last to see his missing girls. Believing that this customer is trafficking his women, Joong-ho nevertheless sends Mi-jin in so that she can forward the customer's address to him. Joong-ho contacts his old police task force for help, but they cannot assist because the mayor of Seoul, whom they were guarding, has been attacked with feces; this results in the police suffering a media firestorm.

The customer, Yeong-min, takes Mi-jin back to the house but Mi-jin fails to contact Joong-ho due to the bathroom having no cell service. Yeong-min binds Mi-jin, but her struggles prevent her murderer with a chisel, so Yeong-min hits her with a hammer, knocking her out. Just then, an elderly couple from the local church arrives, inquiring about the real house owner, Mr. Park; they recognize his dog. Yeong-min then invites the elderly couple in and murders them.

Joong-ho, only aware of the customer's district, searches. Yeong-min tries to ditch the couple's car, but collides with Joong-ho's car. Joong-ho's suspicions are aroused as Yeong-min has blood on his shirt and refuses to give his phone number. Joong-ho calls the customer's number and Yeong-min's phone rings. Yeong-min flees but is caught and beaten by Joong-ho. Both men are arrested by a local cop. At the station, Yeong-min casually admits that he committed nine murders. Competing police divisions argue over who will investigate the high-profile unsolved murders in the area.

Despite the confession, the police have no physical evidence so they cannot detain Yeong-min for long. Yeong-min reveals Mi-jin is alive, but the police doubt it. Joong-ho goes to Mi-jin's apartment to collect DNA samples, and from there he takes Mi-jin's daughter Eun-ji with him while he follows up a lead in Yeong-min's hometown. Joong-ho learns that Yeong-min was jailed for three years for lobotomizing his nephew. Another prostitute informs Joong-ho that Yeong-min is impotent. When Yeong-min is questioned about his impotency being part of his motive, he attacks the interrogator. Joong-ho's assistant finds a room where Yeong-min had once lived; Joong-ho discovers religious drawings on the room's walls. Eun-ji wanders off while following a woman who looks like her mother, then meets with an accident and is brought to a hospital by Joong-ho.

Yeong-min provides a false lead after being beaten again by Joong-ho. The prosecutor discovers Yeong-min's injuries and demands Yeong-min's release, refusing to wait for DNA test results. Saying that Yeong-min's arrest will be seen as the police's attempt to save face, the prosecutor demands Joong-ho's arrest for injuring Yeong-min. Joong-ho is handcuffed and attacks his former teammates to escape; one of them frees him.

Meanwhile, Mi-jin frees herself and escapes from the house. Badly injured, she finds help at a nearby corner shop and hides in the back. The police are informed, but the nearest officers are fast asleep. Yeong-min stops at the same shop to buy cigarettes. Not knowing Yeong-min is the attacker himself, the shopkeeper tells him about Mi-jin's story, asking him to stay to protect them from the attacker while they await the police. Yeong-min uses the shopkeeper's hammer to murder both her and Mi-jin. Alerted by police sirens, Joong-ho arrives to find the police have cordoned off the bloody shop. Yeong-min escapes off-camera back to Mr. Park's house, where he stores Mi-jin's severed head and hands in a fish tank. Yeong-min buries the elderly couple and kills Mr. Park's dog.

The humiliated police throw everything into the search for Yeong-min, while the story is leaked to the public. A distraught Joong-ho follows a lead to the local church and then notices that a church statue matches the drawings he had seen in Yeong-min's old room. As Mr. Park was the sculptor and Yeong-min his "assistant", the deacon points Joong-ho to Mr. Park's house.

Joong-ho enters the residence, interrupting Yeong-min's departure. They fight, with Joong-ho ultimately getting the upper hand, but the police arrive and restrain Joong-ho from killing Yeong-min. Yeong-Min is taken away while the police excavate the yard, finding several bodies.

The film ends with Joong-ho sitting silently by Eun-ji in her hospital room, holding her hand.

== Cast ==
- Kim Yoon-seok as Eom Joong-ho, a dishonest pimp and former police detective
- Ha Jung-woo as Ji Yeong-min, a serial killer
- Seo Young-hee as Kim Mi-jin, a prostitute
- Park Hyo-joo as Detective Oh Eun-shil
- Jung In-gi as Detective Lee Gil-woo
- Kim You-jung as Eun-ji, Mi-jin's daughter
- Koo Bon-woong as Oh-jot, Eom Joong-ho's assistant
- Kim Sun-young as Ji Yeong-min's sister
- Choi Jung-woo as Flag bearer
- Min Kyeong-jin as Captain
- Oh Yeon-ah as Sung-hee
- Jeong Gi-seop as Public prosecutor
- Yeo Mu-yeong as Commissioner of police
- Jung Doo-kyum as Mayor

== Release ==
The film had special screening in the Korean Horizons section of the 25th New York Asian Film Festival on 26 July 2026 as part of the 25th anniversary of the festival.

== Reception ==
=== Box office ===
The Chaser was released in South Korea on February 14, 2008. On its opening weekend it grossed US$3,914,847 and was ranked second at the box office, behind American film Jumper. It then topped the box office for three consecutive weekends, and as of June 1, 2008, had grossed a total of US$35,760,133. The Chaser received a total of 5,120,630 admissions nationwide, which made it the third most popular film in South Korea in 2008, after The Good, the Bad, the Weird and Scandal Makers.

=== Critical response ===
On review aggregator Rotten Tomatoes, The Chaser holds an approval rating of 80%, based on 30 reviews, and an average rating of 6.7/10. Its consensus reads, "A frantic and taut Korean serial killer thriller. One classy, if bloody and messy, gut wrencher of a movie." On Metacritic, the film has a weighted average score of 64 out of 100, based on 11 critics, indicating "generally positive reviews".

=== Awards and nominations ===
| Year | Award | Category | Recipients | Result | Ref. |
|---|---|---|---|---|---|
| 2008 | 61st Cannes Film Festival | Caméra d'Or | Na Hong-jin | Nominated | |
| 2008 | 44th Baeksang Arts Awards | Grand Prize (Daesang) | The Chaser | Won | |
| 2008 | 44th Baeksang Arts Awards | Best Film | The Chaser | Nominated | |
| 2008 | 44th Baeksang Arts Awards | Best Director | Na Hong-jin | Nominated | |
| 2008 | 44th Baeksang Arts Awards | Best Actor | Kim Yoon-seok | Nominated | |
| 2008 | 44th Baeksang Arts Awards | Best Actor | Ha Jung-woo | Nominated | |
| 2008 | 44th Baeksang Arts Awards | Best New Director | Na Hong-jin | Won | |
| 2008 | 44th Baeksang Arts Awards | Best Screenplay | Na Hong-jin and Shinho Lee | Nominated | |
| 2008 | 16th Chunsa Film Art Awards | Best Actor | Kim Yoon-seok | Won | |
| 2008 | 16th Chunsa Film Art Awards | Best Actor | Ha Jung-woo | Won | |
| 2008 | 16th Chunsa Film Art Awards | Best New Director | Na Hong-jin | Won | |
| 2008 | 16th Chunsa Film Art Awards | Best Screenplay | Na Hong-jin and Shinho Lee | Won | |
| 2008 | 16th Chunsa Film Art Awards | Technical Award | Choi Tae-young | Won | |
| 2008 | 9th Busan Film Critics Awards | Best Actor | Kim Yoon-seok | Won | |
| 2008 | 9th Busan Film Critics Awards | Best Screenplay | Na Hong-jin and Shinho Lee | Won | |
| 2008 | 17th Buil Film Awards | Best Film | The Chaser | Nominated | |
| 2008 | 17th Buil Film Awards | Best Director | Na Hong-jin | Won | |
| 2008 | 17th Buil Film Awards | Best Actor | Kim Yoon-seok | Won | |
| 2008 | 17th Buil Film Awards | Best Actor | Ha Jung-woo | Nominated | |
| 2008 | 17th Buil Film Awards | Best New Director | Na Hong-jin | Nominated | |
| 2008 | 17th Buil Film Awards | Best Screenplay | Na Hong-jin | Nominated | |
| 2008 | 17th Buil Film Awards | Buil Readers' Jury Award | The Chaser | Won | |
| 2008 | 17th Buil Film Awards | Best Editing | Kim Sun-min | Won | |
| 2008 | 17th Buil Film Awards | Best Cinematography | Lee Sung-jae | Nominated | |
| 2008 | 17th Buil Film Awards | Best Lighting | Lee Cheol-oh | Nominated | |
| 2008 | 45th Grand Bell Awards | Best Film | The Chaser | Won | |
| 2008 | 45th Grand Bell Awards | Best Director | Na Hong-jin | Won | |
| 2008 | 45th Grand Bell Awards | Best Actor | Kim Yoon-seok | Won | |
| 2008 | 45th Grand Bell Awards | Best Actor | Ha Jung-woo | Nominated | |
| 2008 | 45th Grand Bell Awards | Best Supporting Actress | Seo Young-hee | Nominated | |
| 2008 | 45th Grand Bell Awards | Best New Director | Na Hong-jin | Nominated | |
| 2008 | 45th Grand Bell Awards | Best Screenplay | Na Hong-jin | Nominated | |
| 2008 | 45th Grand Bell Awards | Best Editing | Kim Sun-min | Nominated | |
| 2008 | 45th Grand Bell Awards | Best Cinematography | Lee Sung-jae | Won | |
| 2008 | 45th Grand Bell Awards | Best Planning | Kim Su-jin, Yun In-beom | Won | |
| 2008 | 45th Grand Bell Awards | Best Sound | Kim Sin-yong | Nominated | |
| 2008 | 29th Blue Dragon Film Awards | Best Film | The Chaser | Nominated | |
| 2008 | 29th Blue Dragon Film Awards | Best Actor | Kim Yoon-seok | Won | |
| 2008 | 29th Blue Dragon Film Awards | Best Actor | Ha Jung-woo | Nominated | |
| 2008 | 29th Blue Dragon Film Awards | Best Supporting Actress | Seo Young-hee | Nominated | |
| 2008 | 29th Blue Dragon Film Awards | Best New Director | Na Hong-jin | Nominated | |
| 2008 | 29th Blue Dragon Film Awards | Best Screenplay | Na Hong-jin and Shinho Lee | Nominated | |
| 2008 | 29th Blue Dragon Film Awards | Best Cinematography | Lee Sung-jae | Nominated | |
| 2008 | 29th Blue Dragon Film Awards | Best Music | Kim Jun-seok, Choi Yong-rak | Nominated | |
| 2008 | 29th Blue Dragon Film Awards | Technical Award | Kim Sun-min (Editing) | Nominated | |
| 2008 | 7th Korean Film Awards | Best Film | The Chaser | Won | |
| 2008 | 7th Korean Film Awards | Best Actor | Kim Yoon-seok | Won | |
| 2008 | 7th Korean Film Awards | Best Supporting Actress | Seo Young-hee | Nominated | |
| 2008 | 7th Korean Film Awards | Best Director | Na Hong-jin | Won | |
| 2008 | 7th Korean Film Awards | Best New Director | Na Hong-jin | Won | |
| 2008 | 7th Korean Film Awards | Best Screenplay | Na Hong-jin and Shinho Lee | Won | |
| 2008 | 7th Korean Film Awards | Best Editing | Kim Sun-min | Won | |
| 2008 | 7th Korean Film Awards | Best Cinematography | Lee Sung-jae | Nominated | |
| 2008 | 7th Korean Film Awards | Best Music | Kim Jun-seok, Choi Yong-rak | Nominated | |
| 2008 | University Film Festival of Korea | Best Actor | Kim Yoon-seok | Won | |
| 2008 | 11th Director's Cut Awards | Best Actor | Ha Jung-woo | Won | |
| 2008 | 11th Director's Cut Awards | Best New Director | Na Hong-jin | Won | |
| 2008 | Cine 21 Awards | Best Actor | Ha Jung-woo | Won | |
| 2008 | Cine 21 Awards | Best New Director | Na Hong-jin | Won | |
| 2008 | Cine 21 Awards | Best Screenplay | Na Hong-jin and Shinho Lee | Won | |
| 2008 | 2nd Asia Pacific Screen Awards | Best Actor | Kim Yoon-seok | Nominated | |
| 2008 | 12th Bucheon International Fantastic Film Festival | Best of Puchon | The Chaser | Won | |
| 2008 | 12th Bucheon International Fantastic Film Festival | Best Actress | Seo Young-hee | Won | |
| 2008 | 12th Bucheon International Fantastic Film Festival | EFFFF Asian Award | The Chaser | Won | |
| 2009 | 3rd Asian Film Awards | Best Actor | Ha Jung-woo | Nominated | |
| 2009 | 3rd Asian Film Awards | Best Screenplay | Na Hong-jin and Shinho Lee | Nominated | |
| 2009 | 3rd Asian Film Awards | Best Editing | Kim Sun-min | Won | |

== Remakes and similar productions ==
In March 2008, the remake rights to The Chaser were bought by Warner Bros. for US$1 million. William Monahan was in early discussions to write the script, with Leonardo DiCaprio named as a potential star; no deals have been set. Monahan and DiCaprio were both involved in Martin Scorsese's The Departed, a successful remake of the classic Hong Kong thriller Infernal Affairs. Murder 2, a 2011 Indian Bollywood psychological thriller film, is an unofficial remake of The Chaser.
