= Eye for an Eye (2008 film) =

- Theatrical poster
- Hangul: 눈에는 눈 이에는 이
- RR: Nuneneun nun ieneun i
- MR: Nunenŭn nun ienŭn i
- Directed by: Ahn Gwon-tae; Kwak Kyung-taek
- Written by: Ahn Gwon-tae; Kwak Kyung-taek
- Produced by: Jeong Tae-won
- Starring: Han Suk-kyu; Cha Seung-won
- Cinematography: Hong Kyung-pyo; Oh Hyun-je
- Edited by: Kyung Min-ho
- Music by: Bang Jun-seok
- Production company: Taewon Entertainment
- Distributed by: Lotte Entertainment
- Release date: July 30, 2008
- Running time: 101 minutes
- Country: South Korea
- Language: Korean
- Box office: US$12.4 million

Eye for an Eye (Korean: 눈에는 눈 이에는 이) is a 2008 South Korean neo-noir action thriller film. The film was directed by Ahn Gwon-tae and Kwak Kyung-taek. Starring Han Suk-kyu and Cha Seung-won.

== Plot ==
Veteran police detective Baek Seong-chan is on the verge of retiring to set up his own business. But he is forced to put his plans on hold when ₩1.8 billion is stolen from a bank truck, and then 600 kg of gold from an airport, with the thief having impersonated Baek. The following day, he receives a package of the stolen money from the thief, who identifies himself as Ahn Hyeon-min. Baek pursues Ahn, only to discover that he is being used as a pawn in a greater scheme of revenge.

== Cast ==
- Han Suk-kyu as Baek Seong-chan
- Cha Seung-won as Ahn Hyeon-min
- Song Yeong-chang as Kim Hyeon-tae
- Lee Byung-joon as Antonio
- Jung In-gi as Hwang Min-cheol
- Kim Ji-seok as Song Yoo-gon
- Son Byeong-wook as Kim Do-soo
- Im Sung-kyu as Cha Yeong-jae
- Lee Jae-goo as Detective Park
- Kim Yoon-tae as Detective Kim

== Production ==
The first half of Eye for an Eye was directed by Ahn Gwon-tae, with the rest completed by Kwak Kyung-taek. Filming took place over a period of seven months on location in Seoul, Jeju Island and Busan, and wrapped on 13 January 2008.

== Release ==
Eye for an Eye was released in South Korea on 30 July 2008, and on its opening weekend was ranked third at the box office with 590,494 admissions. As of 29 September it had received a total of 2,073,158 admissions, with a gross of US$12,358,100.
