= Open City (film) =

- Theatrical poster
- Hangul: 무방비 도시
- Hanja: 無防備 都市
- RR: Mubangbi dosi
- MR: Mubangbi tosi
- Directed by: Lee Sang-gi
- Written by: Lee Sang-gi
- Produced by: Jeon Ho-jin
- Starring: Kim Myung-min; Son Ye-jin
- Cinematography: Shin Ok-hyun
- Edited by: Shin Min-kyung
- Music by: Angelo Lee
- Distributed by: CJ Entertainment
- Release date: January 10, 2008
- Running time: 112 minutes
- Country: South Korea
- Language: Korean
- Box office: US$11.1 million

Open City (Korean: 무방비 도시; RR: Mubangbi dosi) is 2008 South Korean neo-noir action thriller film directed by Lee Sang-gi, starring Kim Myung-min and Son Ye-jin as a main character.

== Plot ==
Jo Dae-yeong is a police officer investigating a pickpocket ring with ties to the Japanese crime syndicate, Yakuza. One day he rescues Baek Jang-mi from danger, only to discover that she is the boss of the gang he has been tracking.

== Cast ==
- Kim Myung-min as Jo Dae-yeong
- Son Ye-jin as Baek Jang-mi
- Kim Hae-sook as Kang Man-ok
- Son Byong-ho as Oh Yeon-soo
- Shim Ji-ho as Choi Seong-soo
- Yoon Yoo-sun as Jo Soo-hyeon
- Kim Byeong-ok as Hong Ki-taek/Hong Yong-taek
- Ji Dae-han as Kim Kwang-seob
- Park Gil-soo as Son Yong-soo
- Do Gi-seok as Lee Won-jong
- Kim Joon-bae as Franken

== Release ==
Open City was released in South Korea on 10 January 2008, and on its opening weekend was ranked second at the box office with 449,669 admissions. The film sold a total of 1,613,728 admissions nationwide, and as of 24 February 2008 had grossed a total of US$11,095,236.
