= 2012 in webcomics =

Notable events of 2012 in webcomics.

== Events ==
- Chang Kim launches Tapastic in October 2012.
- Andrew Hussie's Hiveswap becomes the most successful webcomic-related Kickstarter project of all time, raising over US$2,000,000.

=== Awards ===
- Eagle Awards, "Favourite Web-Based Comic" won by Warren Ellis and Paul Duffield's FreakAngels.
- Eisner Awards, "Best Digital Comic" won by Mike Norton's Battlepug.
- Harvey Awards, "Best Online Comics Work" won by Kate Beaton's Hark! A Vagrant.
- Ignatz Awards, "Outstanding Online Comic" won by Jillian Tamaki's SuperMutant Magic Academy.
- Joe Shuster Awards, "Outstanding Web Comics Creator" won by Emily Carroll.
- Reuben Awards, "On-Line Comic Strips" won by Jonathan Rosenberg's Scenes from a Multiverse.
- Aurora Awards, "Best Graphic Novel" won by Tarol Hunt's Goblins.
- Hugo Award for Best Graphic Story won by Ursula Vernon's Digger.

=== Webcomics started ===
- January 2 — Polar by Victor Santos
- January 25 — As the Crow Flies by Melanie Gillman
- January 25 — O Human Star by Blue Delliquanti
- March 14 — The Young Protectors by Alex Woolfson
- April 18 — Mob Psycho 100 by One
- May 21 — Snarlbear by Natalie Riess
- June 17 — Junior Scientist Power Hour by Abby Howard
- June — Nimona by ND Stevenson
- July – August — The Cliff by Oh Seong-dae
- August 8 — Thunderpaw: In the Ashes of Fire Mountain by Jen Lee
- Ability by Son Jae-ho and Lee Gwang-su
- Ava's Demon by Michelle Czajkowski
- It's Geek 2 Me by Francis Cleetus
- MediaEntity by Emilie Tarascou and Simon Kansara
- Misaeng by Yoon Tae-ho
- Strong Female Protagonist by Brennan Lee Mulligan and Lee Knox Ostertag
- Soul Cartel by Kim Eun-hyo and Kim Yeong-ji
- Yarichin Bitch Club by Ogeretsu Tanaka

=== Webcomics ended ===
- Theater Hopper by Tom Brazelton, 2002 – 2012
- Rob and Elliot by Clay and Hampton Yount, 2004 – 2012
- Sin Titulo by Cameron Stewart, 2007 – 2012
- Along with the Gods by Joo Ho-min, 2010 – 2012
- Bucko by Jeff Parker and Erika Moen, 2011 – 2012
- Artifice by Alex Woolfson, 2011 – 2012
