= Ye-rin =

- Hangul: 예린
- RR: Yerin
- MR: Yerin

Ye-rin is a Korean given name.

== People ==
People with this name include

- Mun Ye-rin (born 1990), South Korean pentathlete, silver medalist in modern pentathlon at the 2010 Asian Games
- Yerin (entertainer) (born 1996), South Korean singer, member of girl group GFriend
- Baek Ye-rin (born 1997), South Korean singer
- Bang Ye-rin (born 1996), South Korean actress (Seol In-ah)
- Yerin Ha (born 1998), Australian actress

== Fictional characters ==
Fictional characters with this name include:

- Ye-rin, in South Korean online manhwa Ability
- Seo Ye-rin, in 2012 South Korean film Almost Che
- Lee Ye-rin, in 2013 South Korean television series A Tale Of Two Sisters
- Yerin Arelius, in progression fantasy novel series Cradle by Will Wight

== See also ==
- List of Korean given names
