= Yahoo Music =

Music service by Yahoo!, 2001 to 2018

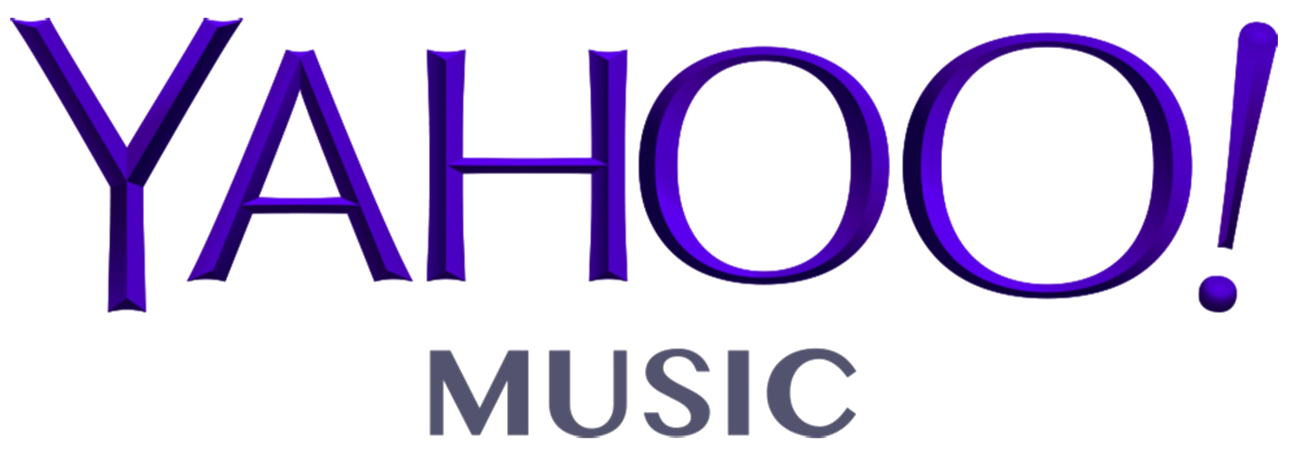
- Website type: Internet radio, digital music store, music streaming service, media player software
- Available in: Multilingual
- Commercial: Yes
- Registration: Optional (required for most)
- Current status: Defunct (merged into Yahoo! Chat Yahoo!)

Previous Yahoo! Music logo used until 2013

Yahoo Music was a brand under which Yahoo provided music services including Internet radio, a digital music store, music streaming service, media player software, and original programming. Yahoo Music was sold to Rhapsody in early 2008.

== Products ==
=== Yahoo Music Radio ===
In June 2001, after the bursting of the dot-com bubble, Yahoo acquired LAUNCH Media, which was facing financial difficulty, for $12 million. In addition to a website with music news and videos, it provided an Internet radio service that allowed users to create personalized Internet radio stations by rating songs selected by a recommender system. Users were also able to listen to music from 150 preset Internet radio stations. The service offered both an advertising supported free version and a subscription fee-based premium version. At the time of the acquisition by Yahoo, the service had 7.4 million users.

In December 2008, the service was integrated into CBS Radio due to a rise in royalty rates, with CBS taking full control of the service, including advertising and sales and adding compatibility with Firefox and Safari.

The service was integrated with iHeartRadio in June 2012, providing listeners exclusive access to music events such as the iHeartRadio Music Festival. The service was shut down in early 2014 without any announcement.

=== Musicmatch Jukebox ===
Musicmatch was a media player software that also operated an internet radio service, which allowed users choose the artist they want to listen to but not the song. MusicMatch Jukebox was launched in 1997 and was bundled with the iPod Classic as its music manager until the introduction of iTunes for Microsoft Windows in 2003. In September 2003, the company launched a digital music store with 200,000 songs available. It had a partnership with Dell to promote the service and software.

On September 14, 2004, Yahoo acquired Musicmatch Jukebox for $160 million. However, the service was not integrated well, instead stagnating. It was shut down on August 31, 2007.

=== Yahoo Music Unlimited ===
Yahoo Music Unlimited
- Launched: May 10, 2005; 21 years ago
- Discontinued: September 30, 2008; 18 years ago
- Platforms: Windows: XP, Vista
- Pricing model: Subscription business model

In May 2005, Yahoo Music launched Yahoo Music Unlimited, a music streaming service and digital music store. Users paid a subscription fee to access a library of over two million songs which could be either streamed or downloaded as DRM-protected Windows Media Audio files and played from a computer in near CD quality sound. Subscribers could also download songs for transfer to CD or supported portable devices with an additional per-song payment. Yahoo Music Jukebox was the software used for the service. The service required an active Internet connection. It was discontinued on September 30, 2008. The service was praised for its music quality, interface, and cheaper price than competitors.

=== Yahoo Music Jukebox ===
Yahoo Music Jukebox
- Other names: Yahoo Music Engine
- Developer: Yahoo
- Release: 2005; 21 years ago
- Final release: 2.2.2.058 / February 6, 2008; 18 years ago
- Operating system: Windows 98, Windows ME, Windows 2000, Windows XP, Windows Vista
- Type: Media player Music streaming service Online radio
- License: Proprietary
- Website: music.yahoo.com/jukebox

Yahoo Music Jukebox, formerly known as Yahoo Music Engine, was a freeware media player software released by Yahoo in 2005 to compete with iTunes and Rhapsody in the digital music market.
