= Delusion (manhwa) =

South Korean graphic novel

- Delusion webtoon cover art

현혹 RR: Hyeonhok MR: Hyŏnhok
- Genre: Fantasy, Horror, Mystery, Romance
- Author: Hongjacga
- Publisher: Story B
- English publisher: Inklore
- Webtoon service: Naver Webtoon (Korean); Line Webtoon (English)
- Original run: September 29, 2019 – November 20, 2020
- Volumes: 3 volumes (in Korean); 2 volumes (in English)

Delusion (Korean: 현혹) is a South Korean manhwa released as a graphic novel written and illustrated by Hongjacga. It was serialized via Naver Corporation's webtoon platform, Naver Webtoon, from June 2019 to November 2020. The chapters were subsequently collected and published in three volumes in July 2022. An English-language print edition is published in September 2026.

A live-action adaptation, titled Portraits of Delusion, has been announced. The series is directed by Han Jae-rim and is scheduled for release as a Disney+ original series in the second half of 2026.

== Plot ==
Set in Gyeongseong in 1935, the narrative centers on Song Jeong-hwa, a mysterious woman who has not ventured outside the Nammun Hotel for decades. As she commissions a new portrait every ten years, she enlists the artist Yun I-ho to capture her likeness. Through their private sessions, Yun I-ho begins to uncover the truth of her existence: Jeong-hwa is a vampire.

== Characters ==
=== Main ===
Yun I-ho
Yun I-ho (윤이호; Yun I-ho) is the primary protagonist of the series. He is an aspiring painter.

Song Jeong-hwa
Song Jeong-hwa (송정화; Song Jeong-hwa) is the main protagonist of the series. She is the proprietor of the Nammun Hotel.

=== Supporting ===
Chen Jin-ren
Chen Jin-ren is a skilled Chinese vampire hunter who becomes Song Jeong-hwa's lover and plays a pivotal role in her survival and transition to Joseon.

Bayarma
Bayarma is a cold, capable vampire hunter operating in Gyeongseong who maintains a complex, protective, and long-standing association with Song Jeong-hwa.

K (Gheorghe Balasa)
K is a centuries-old vampire from Wallachia who serves as the primary antagonist of the flashbacks and the biological father of Song Jeong-hwa.

Xiao Lun
Xiao Lun is a skilled martial artist and the devoted sidekick of Chen Jin-ren who protects a powerful silver sword to assist in the fight against corrupt hunters.

Ludmila
Ludmila is a formidable vampire hunter and the mentor of Chen Jin-ren who serves as a tactical leader until her death at the hands of Xiaolun.

Cheol-sun
Cheol-sun is a former artist who abandoned his personal life to serve as Song Jeong-hwa's butler, ultimately succumbing to despair and suicide after his dismissal.

Myeong-ja
Myeong-ja is a hotel employee and the wife of Cheol-sun who infiltrates the Nammun Hotel in a desperate attempt to find her missing husband.

Marisa Biella
Marisa Biella is a French-Italian noble whose identity and life are stolen by Song Jeong-hwa after their encounter on a ship heading to Gyeongseong.

Song Jeong-hwa's Mother
Song Jeong-hwa's mother is a former maid at K's residence who escapes her captor to raise her daughter in hiding while suffering from severe trauma.

== Media ==
=== Original release ===
Serialization began on Naver Webtoon on September 29, 2019, for a total of 60 chapters. It rose to the top ranks of Friday webtoons within a month of its serialization beginning, thanks to its unique themes of vampires and art. The preview ended on October 9, 2020, and the series concluded on November 13, 2020. On December 15, 2020, the free access period ended and it became a paid service.

=== International release ===
The series has been serialized globally on the Webtoon platform under various titles and schedules. The Traditional Chinese version, titled 魅惑, began serialization on November 23, 2019. The English version, titled Delusion, launched on March 25, 2021, and is available as a Daily Pass Original, providing users access to one episode every 24 hours. The Thai translation, ปริศนามาดามซง, commenced on September 4, 2021, followed by the Spanish version, Delirio, on October 26, 2021. The Indonesian translation of Delusion began serialization on October 21, 2024. It was also published in France in 2024 by Albin Michel in their Koda collection.

=== Printed edition ===
The chapters were subsequently collected and published in three volumes in July 2022.

| No. | Korean release date | Korean ISBN |
|---|---|---|
| 1 | April 15, 2022 | 979-1-18-723987-1 |
Chapter 1 to 20
| 2 | April 15, 2022 | 979-1-18-723988-8 |
Chapter 21 to 40
| 3 | April 15, 2022 | 979-1-18-723989-5 |
Chapter 41 to 60

=== English publication ===
Inklore, an imprint of Random House, announced on July that it has acquired the global English-language print rights for the webtoon Delusion. The agreement was facilitated by Chiara Tognetti of the Chiara Tognetti Rights Agency, representing Story Company Co., with Clara Heathcock of UK and US brokering the deal. The initial volume is scheduled for release in the summer of 2026.

| No. | English release date | English ISBN |
|---|---|---|
| 1 | September 1, 2026 | 979-8-21-709293-2 |
Chapter 1 to 20
| 2 | March 16, 2027 | 979-8-21-709293-2 |
Chapter 21 to 40

== Reception ==
The series began serialization on Naver Webtoon on September 29, 2019. Driven by its unique exploration of vampire themes and art, it reached the top of the platform's Friday rankings within its first month. The webtoon recorded 2.07 million views and maintains a 9.97 rating, establishing a dedicated following.

== Adaptation ==
=== OTT Series ===
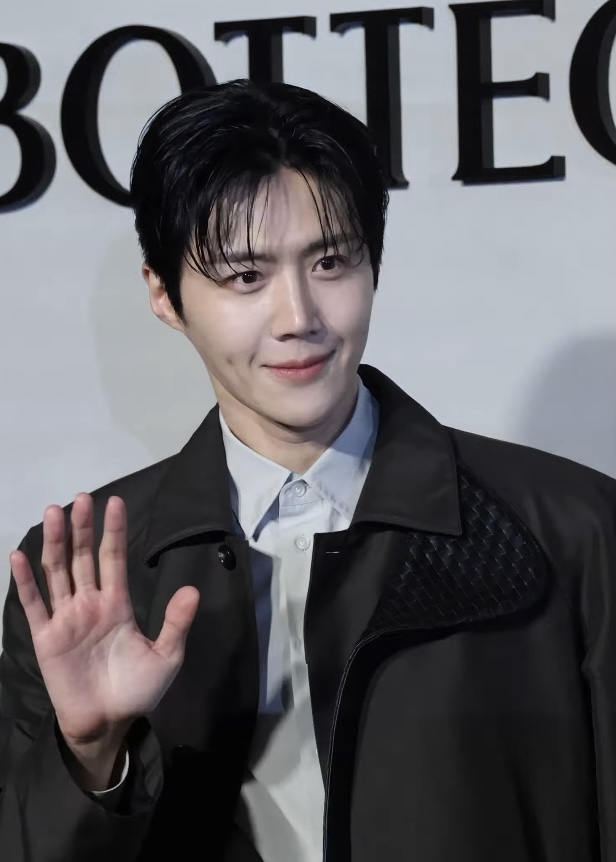
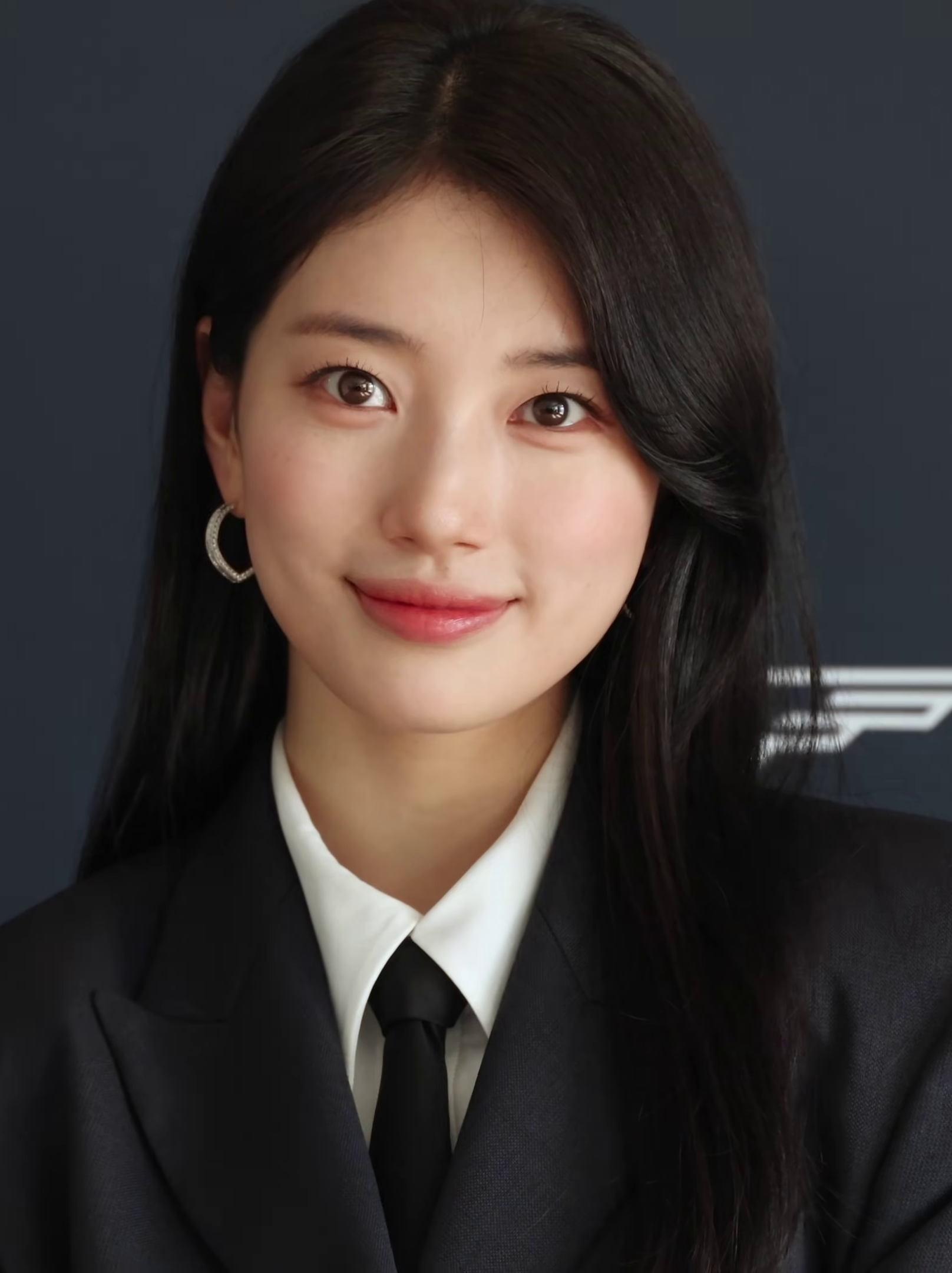
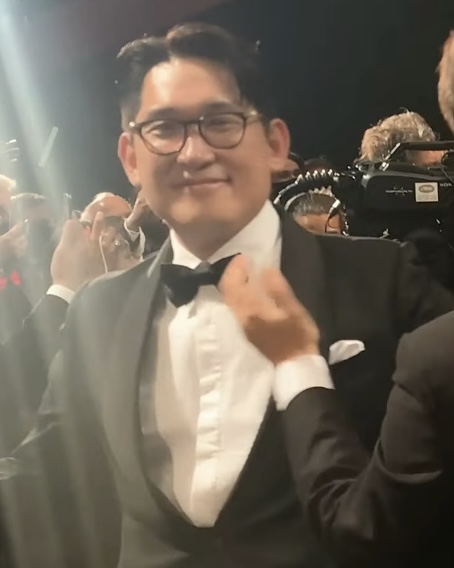
Kim Seon-ho (left), Bae Suzy (middle) and Han Jae-rim (right)

In June 2021, Showbox initially included Delusion in its announced lineup for upcoming drama production plans. By September 2021, reports from film industry insiders indicated that director Han Jae-rim had begun producing a drama adaptation, though the distribution platform and filming timeline remained unconfirmed at that time. The adaptation was officially confirmed as a Disney+ original series on May 23, 2025, with a scheduled release window in 2026. The production budget for the series was estimated at ₩45 billion. On November 13, 2025, during the Disney+ Originals Preview event at the Hong Kong Disneyland Hotel Conference Center, the adaptation's official English title was announced as Portraits of Delusion.

=== Musical adaptation ===
In February 2024, Library Company announced it had finalized a performance rights contract with writer Hongjacga to adapt Delusion into a musical. The project was selected for a large-scale musical competition organized by the Arts Management Support Center in 2026, with a staged reading subsequently scheduled. The full production is set to premiere in 2028.
