= Francis Cleetus =

American cartoonist, creative director

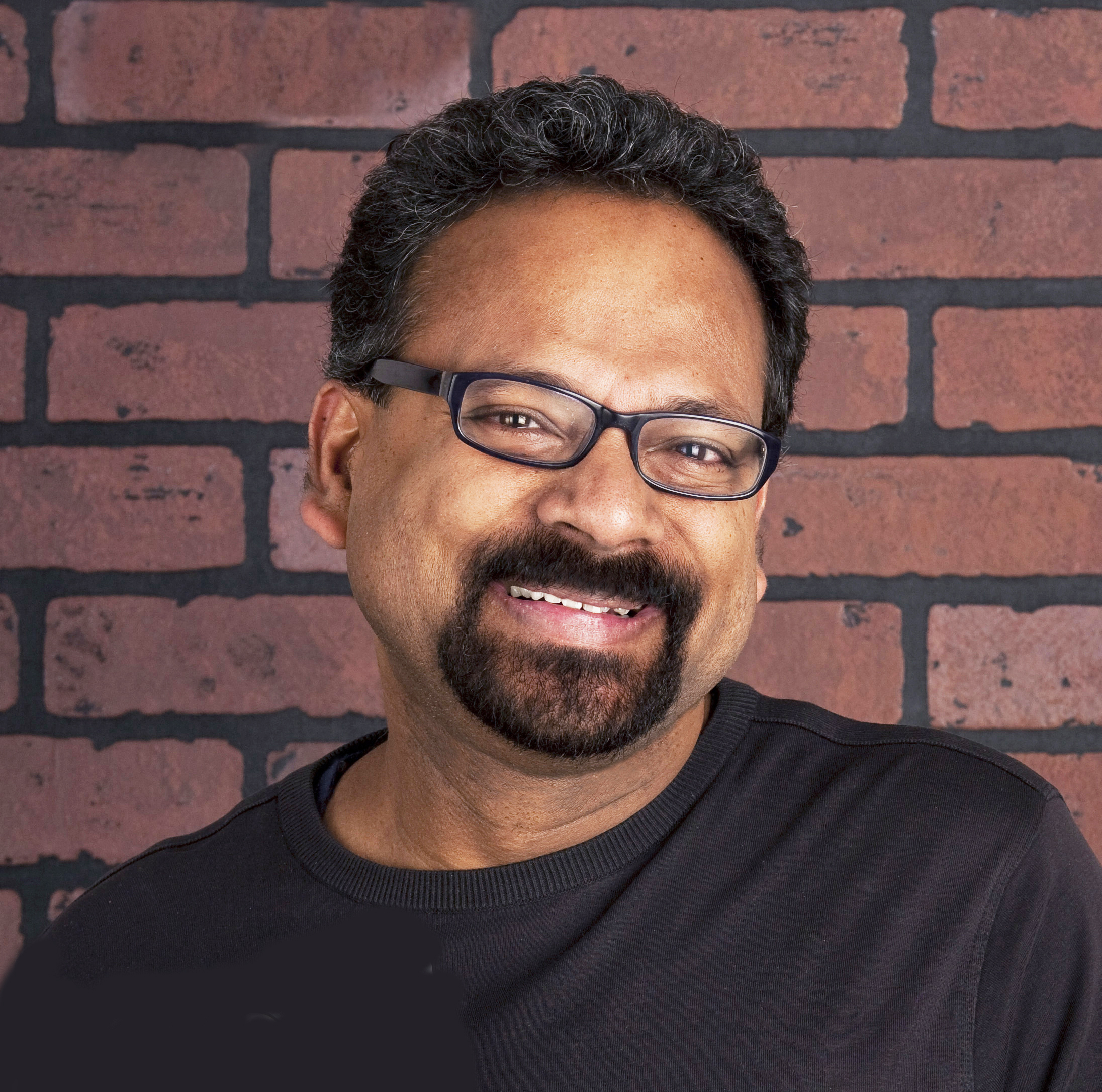
- Cleetus at a book launch event
- Occupations: Cartoonist, painter, sculptor, creative director, graphic designer, copywriter
- Notable work: It's Geek 2 Me
- Website: franciscleetus.com

Francis Cleetus (/ˈkliːtəs/) is an American cartoonist, painter, and sculptor. He is also a creative director, graphic designer, and copywriter, who has worked at various ad agencies including FCB Global, Ogilvy, Wunderman Thompson and Doe-Anderson in India, Hong Kong and the US.

A member of the National Cartoonists Society of America, Cleetus is the author of two It's Geek 2 Me tech cartoon compilations. He has created contemporary art inspired by Indian themes for multiple art shows in the US. He has also developed advertising campaigns for global brands including Moen, Maker's Mark, and MTV.

Cleetus lives in Pittsburgh, Pennsylvania, USA, and continues to work on visual art, brand advertising, corporate communications and pro bono projects.

== It's Geek 2 Me Cartoons ==
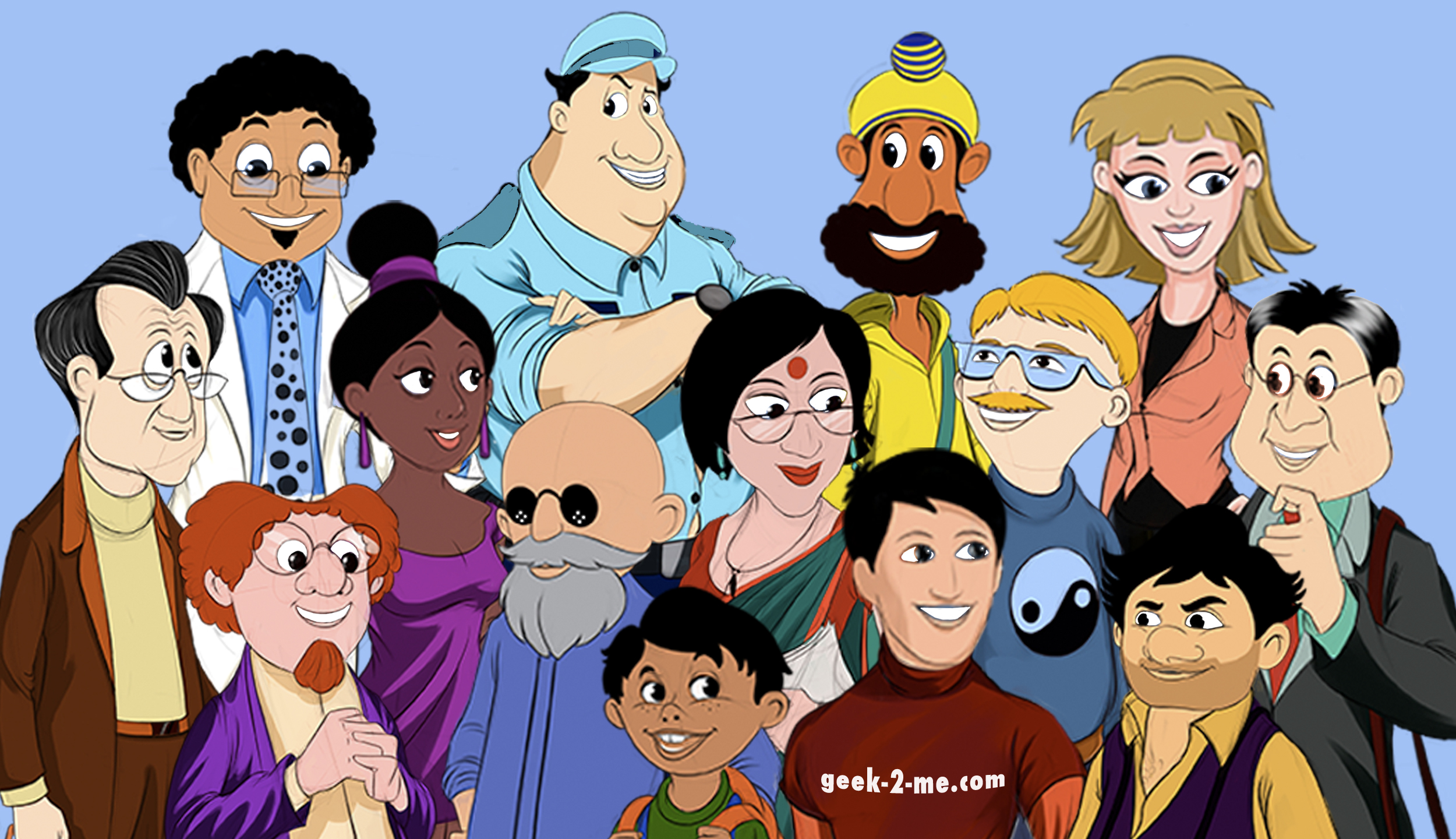
Cast of cartoon characters

A tech cartoon about people and their off-center relationships with technology, "It's Geek 2 Me" pokes fun at its ubiquity in people's lives. Cleetus self-published his first compilation of tech cartoons in 2012 titled Wish Your Mouth Had A Backspace Key in the United States through Amazon.com. In 2013, a new compilation titled It's Geek 2 Me – Total Timepass Tech Toons was published by Hachette India for the Indian subcontinent. He has also drawn tech cartoons for the Pittsburgh Tech Council's TEQ magazine, Tata Consultancy Services' @TCS magazine and other publications.

== Contemporary Art ==
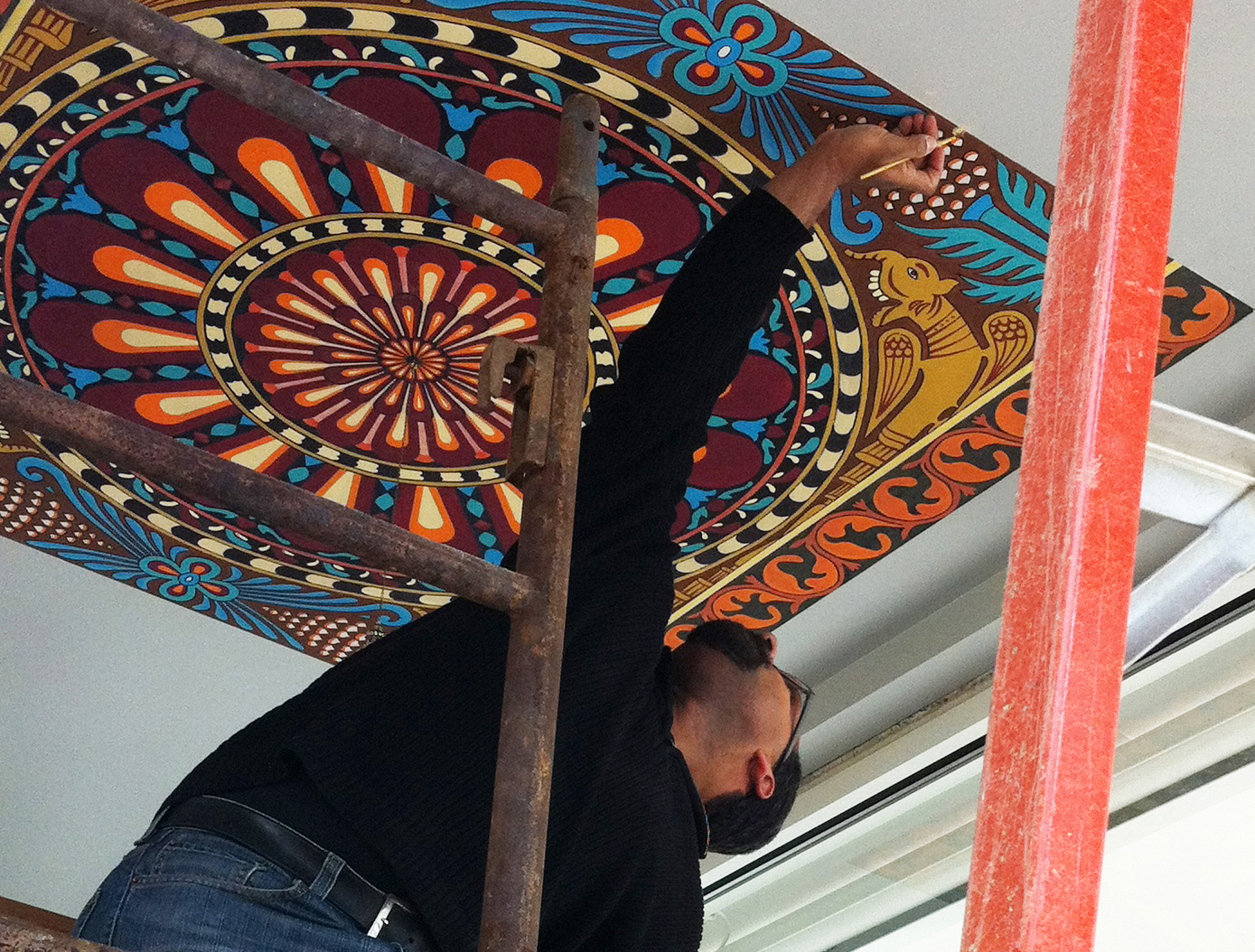
Adding finishing touches to a mural

In February 2012, the Phipps Conservatory and Botanical Gardens in Pittsburgh commissioned Cleetus to recreate ceiling murals from a 16th-century palace for their Tropical Forest India exhibit. The Asia Institute – Crane House in Louisville invited him to host a solo exhibition in June 2017. Pittsburgh's Not-white Collective featured his paintings in their 2018 juried exhibition "In Between the Middle". In January 2018, the Greater Pittsburgh Arts Council (GPAC) showcased "Karmalogue", a themed show around Cleetus' paintings, drawings and sculptures as part of the Gallery Crawl organized by the Pittsburgh Cultural Trust. In August 2018, the Westmoreland Cultural Trust put together "Conglomeration", a group show that included his work. The RAW artists organization invited Cleetus in November 2018 to participate in their Pittsburgh creative showcase "Ovation" that featured over 60 artists. In January 2020, his paintings were part of the "Past, Present, Future" exhibit organized by GPAC along with 140 other visual artists.

== Advertising Campaigns ==
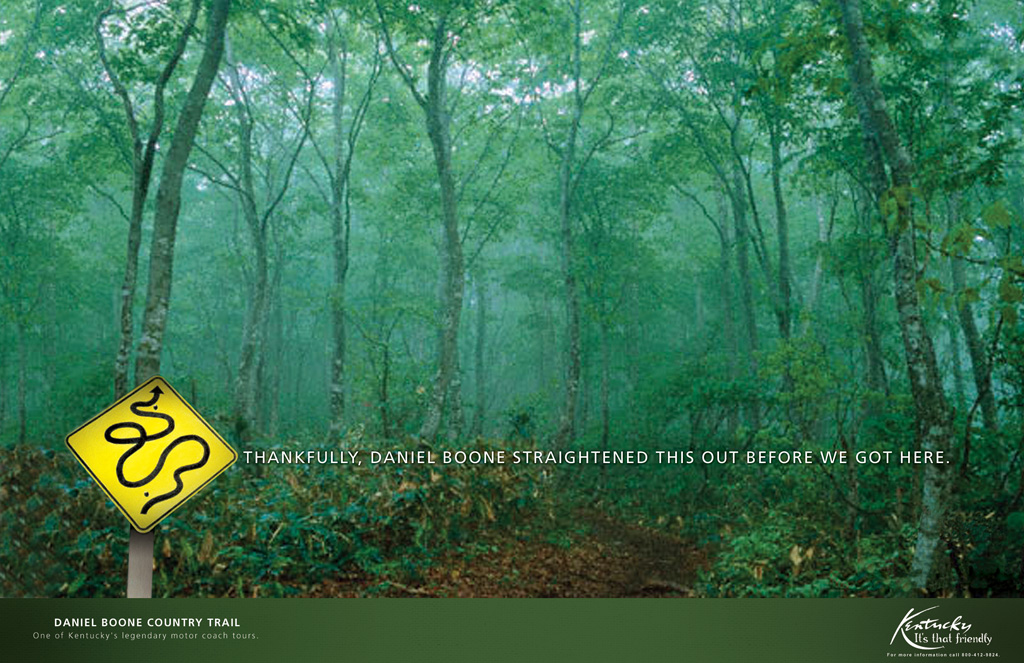
Kentucky tourism poster campaign

Cleetus has created integrated advertising campaigns for global brands at ad agencies in three countries. After spending his formative years at FCB Global in India, he moved in the mid-nineties to Hong Kong and worked at Ogilvy, Wunderman Thompson and DMB&B, before relocating to the United States in 2001 to work at Doe-Anderson. In 2007, he moved to Pittsburgh-based agency MARC USA. His advertising campaigns for Maker's Mark bourbon, Moen faucets, Epilepsy Foundation and Mohawk flooring have crossed cultural borders and won creative awards in Asia, Europe and the US.

== Pro Bono Work ==
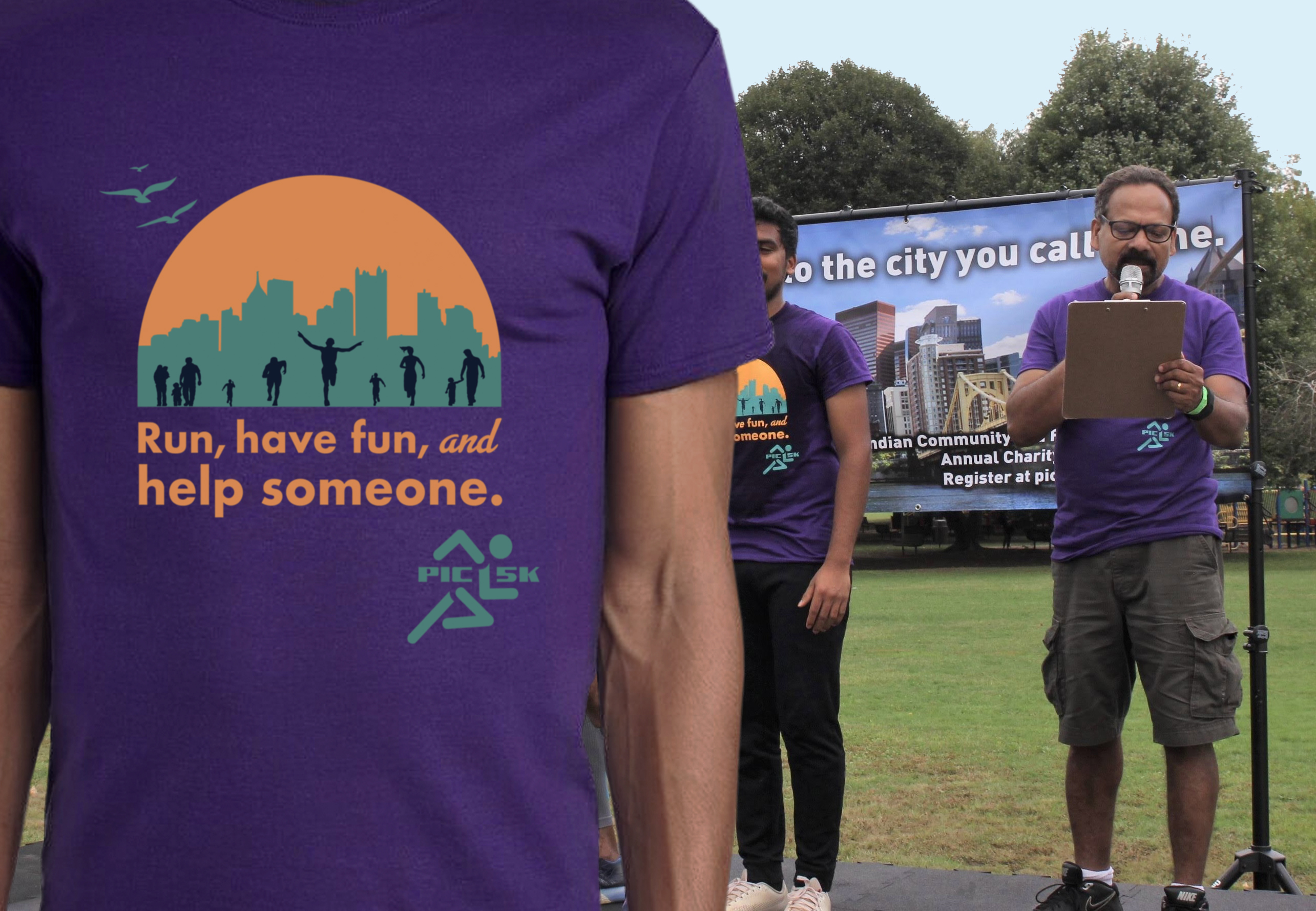
Hosting the 2019 PIC5K event.

Since 2013, Cleetus has been on the executive committee at Pittsburgh Indian Community & Friends, a non-profit that hosts the Annual PIC5K Run in the city. The organization has raised over $650,000 for local charities including the Greater Pittsburgh Community Food Bank and the Allegheny County Fire Academy, among others. In 2015, he joined AHINSA (Alliance for Humanitarian Initiatives Nonviolence and Spiritual Advancement), an intercultural forum for peace, nonviolence, and spirituality. The non-profit organized the "Music for Peace"concert featuring Grammy-winning artist Chandrika Tandon and Pittsburgh-based MCG Jazz at Carnegie Music Hall. In 2021, Cleetus was invited to participate in the FISA Foundation’s “Southwest PA Says No More” initiative in partnership with the Heinz Endowments and United Way. He joined a diverse group of Pittsburgh dads to take a Father’s Day Pledge to help prevent sexual assault and domestic violence.

== Compilations ==
1. Total Timepass Tech Toons (August 2013, Hachette India, ISBN 978-93-5009-624-6)
2. Wish Your Mouth Had a Backspace Key (October 2006, Amazon.com, ISBN 978-14495-8712-3)
