= Portraits of Delusion =

Upcoming South Korean television series

- Hangul: 현혹
- Hanja: 眩惑
- Lit.: Delusion
- RR: Hyeonhok
- MR: Hyŏnhok
- Genre: Period drama; Mystery
- Based on: Delusion by Hongjacga
- Written by: Han Jae-rim
- Directed by: Han Jae-rim
- Starring: Bae Suzy; Kim Seon-ho
- Country of origin: South Korea
- Original language: Korean

Production
- Cinematography: Hong Kyung-pyo
- Production companies: Showbox; Magnum Nine
- Budget: ₩45 billion

Original release
- Network: Disney+

Portraits of Delusion (Korean: 현혹) is an upcoming South Korean television series based on the eponymous graphic novel by Hongjacga, directed by Han Jae-rim, and starring Bae Suzy and Kim Seon-ho. It is co-produced by Showbox and Magnum Nine, and scheduled for release on Disney+ in the first half of 2027.

== Premise ==
Set in 1935 Gyeongseong, the story follows struggling artist Yun I-ho, who is commissioned by the reclusive elderly Madam Song Jeong-hwa to create a portrait. In a rare moment, she allows him to see her, revealing a young woman before him. However, she requests that he paint an elderly version of herself. Hidden among the previous artist's paint tubes is a troubling letter. Yun I-ho discovers that no artist has left Madam Song Jeong-hwa's home alive or in a sound state of mind. The mystery deepens as he contemplates what she is concealing and the potential consequences of completing the portrait.

== Cast ==
=== Main ===
- Bae Suzy as Madam Song Jeong-hwa, a vampire.
- Kim Seon-ho as Yun I-ho, a painter.
- Huh Joon-ho as Bayarma
- Choi Hyun-wook

=== Supporting ===
- Lee Hak-joo
- Shin Su-hyun as Eun-chae
- Geum Hae-na

=== Special appearance ===
- Kim Young-kwang as K

== Production ==
=== Development ===
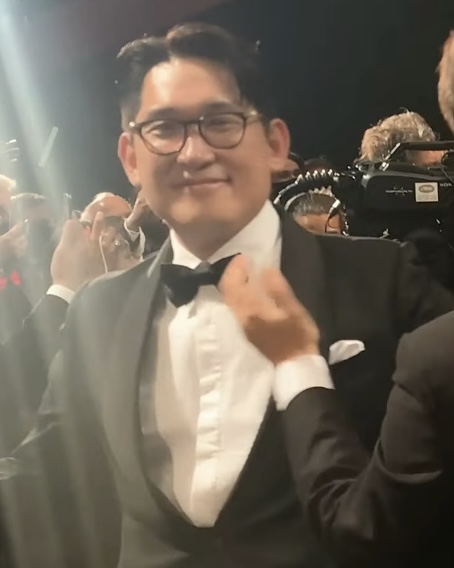
Director Han Jae-rim (pictured)

In June 2021, Showbox announced plans to produce drama adaptations of several webtoons, including Delusion by Hongjacga. On September 2, 2021, a film industry insider reported that director Han Jae-rim had begun development on the series. The specific platform for release and the timeline for filming had yet to be determined at the time.

On May 23, 2025, Disney+ confirmed that it would release Delusion as an original series in 2026. The project has an estimated production budget of ₩45 billion. During the Disney+ Originals Preview 2025 event held on November 13, 2025, at the Hong Kong Disneyland Hotel Conference Center, the official English title was revealed as Portraits of Delusion.

To adapt the webtoon for the screen, the production team opted to move away from the original Shanghai setting in favor of a fictional location referred to as "K's City". This space was designed to reflect the worldview and desires of the character K through its specific aesthetic, texture, and atmosphere. To offer a unique perspective on the vampire genre, production designers blended the cold, architectural textures of medieval Europe with a mysterious, humid ambiance. The narrative structure for the past sequences was designed to move beyond a standard flashback format. Instead, these segments are structured to allow the audience to track the emotional progression of Jeonghwa’s transformation. The city functions as a pivotal setting for this evolution, serviung as the threshold where Jeonghwa loses her innocence and transitions into a vampire.

Regarding the adaptation process, the original webtoon author Hongjacga expressed strong support for director Han Jae-rim's creative vision, specifically noting Han's accurate understanding of the story's final scene. The author welcomed creative expansions of the source material for the screen adaptation, stating that "as long as the core essence that runs through the work remains intact."

=== Casting ===
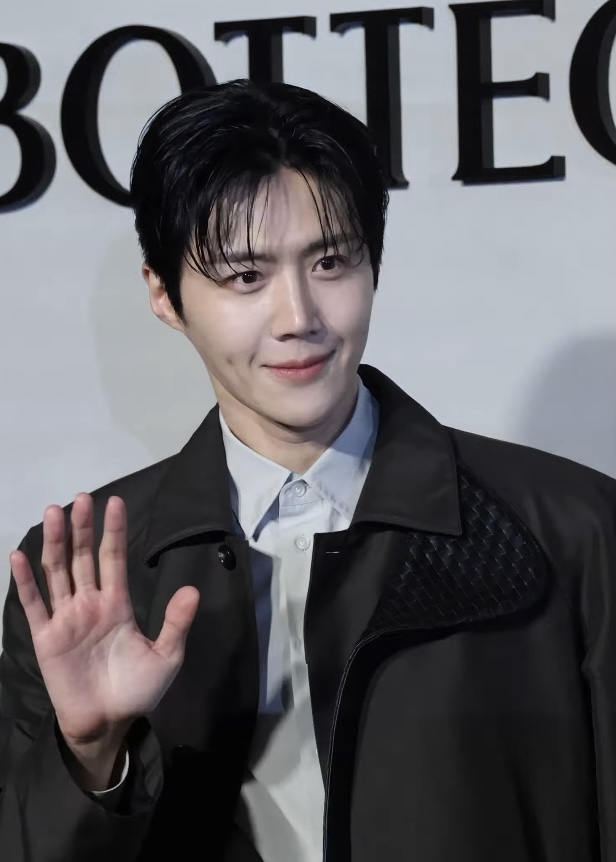
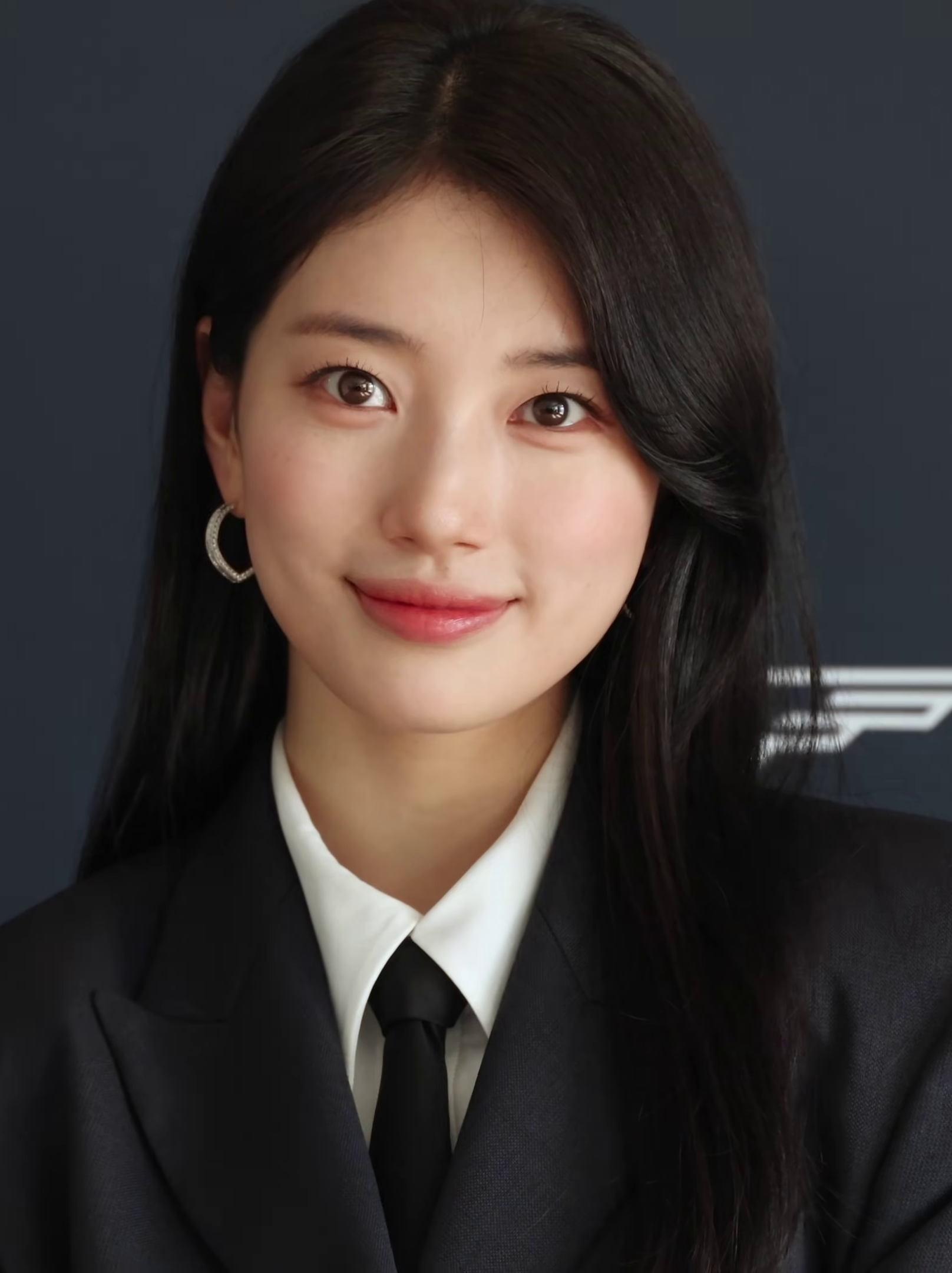
Kim Seon-ho (left) and Bae Suzy (right)

Ryu Jun-yeol and Han So-hee were initially considered for the lead roles of Yun I-ho and Song Jeong-hwa respectively. However, they withdrew from the project following the end of their relationship in March 2024. On July 30, 2024, a representative from Management Soop confirmed to Sports Chosun that Bae Suzy was reviewing an offer for the lead role Song Jeong-hwa. Although she had been approached for the role prior to Han So-hee, she initially declined due to scheduling conflicts. In August, reports emerged that Kim Seon-ho was in talks to star opposite Bae, marking a reunion for the pair after their 2020 collaboration in Start-Up. Their casting was officially confirmed on May 23, 2025, when Disney+ released photos from the script reading.

Director Han Jae-rim noted that Jeonghwa is defined by a beauty that serves as both a narrative driver and a personal burden. Conversely, I-ho hides deep-seated conflicts and past trauma beneath a calm exterior. The director sought actors capable of navigating the subtle asymmetry between these characters' outward appearances and inner lives. In an interview with Bangkok Business News, Yeonu Choi, Head of Local Content at The Walt Disney Company Korea, expressed how pleased they are to have Kim Seon-ho join the project, praising him for delivering an outstanding and handsome performance on screen.

=== Filming ===
In October 2025, the production team canceled its scheduled on-location filming in Shanghai, China, due to local conditions. Production shifted entirely to provincial locations within South Korea to represent the series' setting. In December 2025, leads Bae and Kim were spotted running near West Lake, Hanoi, sparking speculation that they were filming in Vietnam.

== Release ==
Portraits of Delusion is produced as a 12-episode series and was scheduled to be released on Disney+ in the second half of 2026. On November 18, 2026, Disney+ unveiled its 2027 lineup of original Korean content during the "Disney+ Media Day" held at Conrad Seoul in Yeongdeungpo-gu, Seoul. Portraits of Delusion has been included in the lineup for the first half of next year.
