= Atran =

ATRAN may refer to:

- ATRAN, a Russian cargo airline
- ATRAN (Automatic Terrain Recognition And Navigation), a radar map-matching system developed by Goodyear Aircraft Corporation in the 1950s and used in the MGM-13 Mace missile

Atran may refer to:

- Ätran (river), river in south-western Sweden
- Ätran (locality), locality in Falkenberg Municipality, Sweden, named after the river
- Scott Atran (born 1952), American and French anthropologist
- Atran, an organisation in the Ability webcomic

== See also ==
- Atrane, a heterocyclic organic compound
- Atrans, the Roman name for Trojane, a town in Slovenia
