= Project Makeover =

- Theatrical poster
- Hangul: 언니가 간다
- RR: Eonniga ganda
- MR: Ŏnniga kanda
- Directed by: Kim Chang-rae
- Written by: Choi Mil; Hwang Jo-yoon; Kim Chang-rae; Kim Hyeon-jin; Park Ye-jeong
- Produced by: Kim Tae-eun; Im Seung-yong
- Starring: Ko So-young; Yoo Gun; Jo An
- Cinematography: Kim Young-no
- Edited by: Kim Sang-bum; Kim Jae-bum
- Music by: Yoon Jong-sin; Lee Geun-ho
- Distributed by: Cinema Service
- Release date: January 4, 2007
- Running time: 112 minutes
- Country: South Korea
- Language: Korean
- Box office: $986,264

Project Makeover (Korean: 언니가 간다; RR: Eonniga ganda; also known as Operation Makeover or Go Go Sister) is a 2007 South Korean film. In an online poll conducted by web portal Daum, Korean netizens named Project Makeover as the worst film of 2007.

== Plot ==
Na Jung-ju is a 30-year-old woman whose life is going nowhere, and she blames her misery on a failed high school romance with Jo Ha-ni, who has since become a famous singer. Her old schoolfriend Oh Tae-hun, who used to have a big crush on her, is now a successful and wealthy businessman, and she regrets not having gone out with him. After being given the chance to travel back in time, Jung-ju goes back to 1994 where she tries to convince her younger self to date the future businessman.

== Cast ==
- Ko So-young as Na Jung-ju (age 30)
  - Jo An as Na Jung-ju (age 18)
- Yoo Gun as Oh Tae-hun (age 18)
  - Lee Beom-soo as Oh Tae-hun
- Lee Joong-moon as Jo Ha-ni (age 18)
- Oh Mi-hee as Jung-ju's mother
- Ok Ji-yeong as Jung-ju's friend (?)
- Oh Dal-su as Jung-ju's father

== Release ==
Project Makeover was released in South Korea on January 4, 2007, and on its opening weekend was ranked fifth at the box office with 110,708 admissions. The film received a total of 174,543 admissions nationwide, and as of February 24, 2008 had grossed a total of US$986,264.
