= Yoo Gun =

South Korean actor (born 1983)

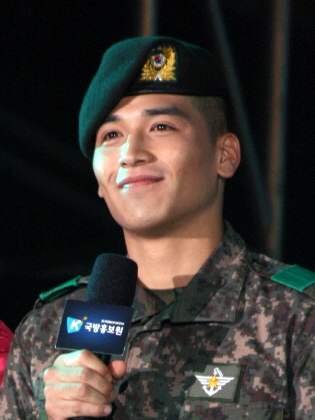
- Yoo in 2014
- Born: Jo Jeong-ik; 21 January 1983 (age 43); Arizona, United States
- Other name: U Gun
- Citizenship: South Korea
- Education: Seoul Institute of the Arts – Broadcasting Entertainment; Konkuk University – Film Art
- Occupations: Actor; singer
- Agent: L&Company

Korean name
- Hangul: 조정익
- RR: Jo Jeongik
- MR: Cho Chŏngik

Stage name
- Hangul: 유건
- Hanja: 劉建
- RR: Yu Geon
- MR: Yu Kŏn

Jo Jeong-ik (born 21 January 1983), better known by his stage name Yoo Gun, is an American-born South Korean actor.

== Early life ==
Jo Jeong-ik was born in Arizona, United States to Korean American parents. He came to South Korea in the 1990s as a teenager. He is a first cousin of coloratura soprano Sumi Jo.

== Career ==
Under the stage name Yoo Gun, he began his entertainment career in 1997 as a singer in South Korean boy band Oppa. Yoo rose to popularity through his first leading role in the 2006 television drama Hello, God! (안녕하세요 하느님); he played a mentally challenged character based on "Charlie" in the novel Flowers for Algernon. Supporting roles followed in the comedy films Dasepo Naughty Girls, Project Makeover, Mission Possible: Kidnapping Granny K, and My Mighty Princess. Yoo underwent six months of martial arts training for his next leading role in the action drama Fight, which aired on cable in 2008. Besides appearing in the TV series Bad Couple, Can't Stop Now, and Prosecutor Princess, he also made his theater debut in 2010 in the stage play Thief's Diary.

In 2011, he renounced his U.S. citizenship in order to serve in the South Korean army. Yoo enlisted as an ordinary soldier in March 2011, and was later transferred to the Defense Media Agency in October 2011, where he took over as DJ of the military radio program This is Friends FM Yoo Gun. He also appeared on the KFN (Korean Forces Network) TV program March in 2012.

After his discharge in December 2012, Yoo quickly resumed his career, appearing on the travel program The World is Delicious (오감만족 세상은 맛있다) in an episode about Brazil, followed by a cameo on the melodrama That Winter, the Wind Blows. Yoo then headlined the KBS1 daily drama A Tale of Two Sisters in 2013.

== Filmography ==
Note: the whole section is referenced.

=== Television series ===
- Graceful Friends (JTBC, 2020)
- 365: Repeat the Year (MBC, 2020) (cameo, ep. 1–2)
- I Wanna Hear Your Song (KBS2, 2019)
- The Last Empress (SBS, 2018–2019)
- Sweet Enemy (SBS, 2017)
- Dr. Frost (OCN, 2014)
- Hotel King (MBC, 2014)
- Steal Heart (jTBC, 2014)
- A Tale of Two Sisters (KBS1, 2013)
- That Winter, the Wind Blows (SBS, 2013) (cameo, ep. 4)
- KBS Drama Special – "Texas Hit" (KBS2, 2010)
- Prosecutor Princess (SBS, 2010)
- Can't Stop Now (MBC, 2009)
- Drama City – "LoveForSale.com" (KBS2, 2008)
- Fight (tvN, 2008)
- Here He Comes (MBC, 2008)
- Bad Couple (SBS, 2007)
- Hello, God! (KBS2, 2006)
- Something About 1% (MBC, 2004)

=== Film ===
- Insane (2016)
- Where are To Go? (2013)
- My Mighty Princess (2008)
- Mission Possible: Kidnapping Granny K (2007)
- Project Makeover (2007)
- Dasepo Naughty Girls (2006)

=== Variety show ===
- Buy Together (MBC Every 1, 2009)
- Yoo Gun's Love Fighter (Mnet, 2007–2008)

=== Music video appearances ===
- "As a Man, Not a Friend" (Lee Seok-hoon, 2013)
- "Love Actually" (JJ, 2007)
- "Handkerchief" (Kim Dong-wan, 2007)

== Theater ==
- Crash Course in Love (2010)
- Thief's Diary (2009)
