= Gangkiz =

South Korean girl group

- Origin: Seoul, South Korea
- Genres: K-Pop
- Years active: 2012–2014
- Labels: Core Contents Media; GM Contents Media (2012)
- Past members: Jihyun; Sooeun; Somin; Eunbyul; Haein; Hyeji; Esther

Gangkiz (Korean: 갱키즈) was a South Korean girl group formed by Core Contents Media. Consisting of members Jihyun, Sooeun, Hae-in, Somin, Eunbyul, Esther, and Hyeji, the group debuted in May 2012, with their first extended play, We Became Gang. In April 2013, it was revealed that all members, with the exception of Esther and Hyeji, had departed the group. The remaining members are presumed to have disbanded sometime in 2014. No official announcement regarding the group's dissolution was ever made.

== Career ==
=== 2012: We Became Gang and MAMA ===
Gangkiz was originally created by Core Contents Media, but later moved to a subsidiary label, GM Contents Media, before their debut. The group officially debuted on May 15, 2012, with the release of their debut album We Became Gang. They held their debut live performance on May 18 through KBS Music Bank. Gangkiz released a seven-part music video for their debut song "Honey Honey", which is described as an "upgraded version of T-ara's "Roly-Poly" and "Lovey-Dovey" with a more mature concept".

The group released a repackaged mini-album titled "MAMA" on June 26, 2012. The music video for "MAMA" was released on June 22, 2012. The group was transferred from GM Contents Media back to Core Contents Media in October 2012.

=== 2013–2014 Member Departures and Disbandment ===
With no releases for the remainder of 2012, Gangkiz was scheduled to make a comeback in early 2013. However, after opening CCM's official fancafé, it was revealed that most of the original line-up had quietly withdrawn from the group, and that only Esther and Hyeji remained. Haein subsequently confirmed her departure. In 2014, Hyeji's Twitter account was deleted, Esther's went inactive, and the group's official fancafé was shut down. Although Core Contents Media has never released an official statement, the group is believed to have completely disbanded.

== Members ==
- Jihyun (지현)
- Choi Soo-eun (수은)
- Lee Hae-in (해인)
- Somin (소민)
- Jo Eun-byul (은별)
- Esther (에스더)
- Hyeji (혜지)

== Discography ==
=== Extended plays ===
Title	Album details	Peak chart positions	Sales
Title	Album details	KOR	Sales
We Became Gang	Released: May 16, 2012; Label: GM Contents Media; Formats: CD, digital download; Track listing: 1. Honey Honey; 2. 오늘밤 (Tonight); 3. 슈퍼러브 (SUPER LOVE); 4. 쉿 (Shh); 5. 난 이별을 모를래요 (I Would Never Think of Goodbye)	15	KOR: 3,000
MAMA (We Became Gang repackaged)	Released: June 25, 2012; Label: GM Contents Media; Formats: CD, digital download; Track listing: 1. MAMA; 2. Honey Honey; 3. 오늘밤 (Tonight); 4. 슈퍼러브 (SUPER LOVE); 5. 쉿 (Shh); 6. 난 이별을 모를래요 (I Would Never Think of Goodbye)	22	KOR: 1,182

=== Singles ===
Title	Year	Peak chart positions		Album
Title	Year	KOR Gaon	KOR Billboard	Album
"Honey Honey"	2012	167	—	We Became Gang
"MAMA"	2012	106	95	MAMA
"—" denotes release did not chart.

== Videography ==
=== Music videos ===
Year	Title	Length	Notes
2012	Honey Honey (Europe Ver.)	7:18	
2012	Honey Honey (Lipsync Ver.)	3:03	
2012	Honey Honey (Dance Ver.)	4:54	
2012	Mama (Drama Ver.)	5:01	
2012	Mama (Dance Ver.)	3:35	
