= The Cat Funeral =

- Poster
- Directed by: Lee Jong-hoon
- Written by: Lee Jong-hoon
- Based on: The Cat Funeral by Hong
- Produced by: Lee Jong-hoon
- Starring: Kangin; Park Se-young
- Cinematography: Kim Mu-yu
- Edited by: Son Yeon-ji
- Music by: Yiruma
- Production companies: Indieplug; Home Choice
- Distributed by: Indieplug
- Release date: January 15, 2015
- Running time: 107 minutes
- Country: South Korea
- Language: Korean
- Box office: US$20,726

The Cat Funeral (Korean: 고양이 장례식; RR: Goyangi jangnyesik) is a 2015 South Korean romantic drama film written, directed and produced by Lee Jong-hoon, based on the webtoon of the same name by Hongjacga.

== Plot ==
Indie musician Dong-hoon and cartoonist Jae-hee broke up a year ago. The former couple meet again after the death of the cat they owned together, and go on a night's trip to hold a funeral for their pet.

== Cast ==
- Kangin as Dong-hoon
- Park Se-young as Jae-hee
- Jung Gyu-woon as Hyeon-seok
- Hong Wan-pyo as Jin-hyeok
- Kim Byeong-choon as Dong-hoon's father
- Cha Min-ji as Eun-kyeong
