= Standing Egg =

South Korean indie pop band

Standing Egg (스탠딩 에그)
- Origin: South Korea
- Genres: Pop, indie, acoustic
- Years active: 2010–present
- Label: Von Entertainment
- Members: Egg 1; Egg 2; Egg 3
- Website: www.standingegg.com

Standing Egg (Korean: 스탠딩 에그; stylized as Standing EGG or STANDING EGG) is a South Korean indie acoustic pop band that debuted in 2010 under Von Entertainment. The band consists of three members, pseudonymously known as Egg 1, Egg 2, and Egg 3, who produce and compose the music. As they do not have a vocalist or musicians, they feature various guest artists such as Clover (guitar, vocals), Windy (vocals), Han Gyul (double bass), or Hana (djembe) for their songs and performances.

== Career ==
Standing Egg debuted with a self-titled EP in 2010 that consisted of three songs. The band did not promote its release, so the album reached the public through the group's Twitter, as they used the account to share their music and jokingly asked one of their followers to create a music video for one of their songs, "La La La". The follower agreed to the request and created a music video that quickly became popular and ranked on several music charts.

Their first full-length album, released in November 2010, climbed to the top of Melon Indie Music Chart, the equivalent of Billboard charts in the United States. Since then, they have consistently released an album and a few singles every year. Their latest album, Voice, along with a music video for the eponymous title track, was released in November 2016.

Standing Egg is currently one of the most well-known Korean indie musicians, and notable for their ability to rank in music charts with few to no promotions.

== Members ==
- Egg 1 (에그1호) – composition
- Egg 2 (에그2호) – composition, vocals
- Egg 3 (에그3호) – lyrics

=== Live performance team ===
- Windy (윈디) – vocals
- Lee Ye-seul (이예슬) – vocals
- Clover (클로버) – vocals, guitar
- Lee Ye-ni (이예니) – keyboard
- Lee Han-kyul (이한결) – double bass, electric bass
- Song Ha-na (송하나) – djembe, percussion

== Discography ==
=== Studio albums ===
Title	Album details	Peak chart positions	Sales
Title	Album details	KOR	Sales
With	Released: November 25, 2010; Label: Von Entertainment, NHN Entertainment; Formats: CD, digital download	—	—N/a
Like	Released: April 10, 2012; Label: Von Entertainment, CJ E&M; Formats: CD, digital download	29	KOR: 809
Shine	Released: October 4, 2013; Label: Von Entertainment, Sony Music Korea; Formats: CD, digital download	27	KOR: 1,151
Us	Released: December 5, 2014; Label: Von Entertainment, NHN Entertainment; Formats: CD, digital download	24	KOR: 736
Dramatic	Released: December 1, 2017; Label: Von Entertainment, LOEN Entertainment; Formats: CD, digital download	57	—N/a
Letters from My Old Friend	Released: March 20, 2021; Label: Von Entertainment, LOEN Entertainment; Formats: CD, digital download	—	—N/a

=== Special albums ===
Title	Album details	Peak chart positions	Sales
Title	Album details	KOR	Sales
Moment	Released: December 13, 2013; Label: Von Entertainment, NHN Entertainment; Formats: CD, digital download	53	KOR: 667

=== Extended plays ===
Title	Album details	Peak chart positions	Sales
Title	Album details	KOR	Sales
Lucky	Released: July 7, 2011; Label: Von Entertainment, NHN Entertainment; Formats: CD, digital download	—	—N/a
Ballad With Windy	Released: December 21, 2012; Label: Von Entertainment, NHN Entertainment; Formats: CD, digital download	83	—N/a
Ambler	Released: April 16, 2013; Label: Von Entertainment, Sony Music Korea; Formats: CD, digital download	31	—N/a
36.5	Released: May 8, 2014; Label: Von Entertainment, NHN Entertainment; Formats: CD, digital download	24	KOR: 492
Young	Released: May 22, 2015; Label: Von Entertainment, NHN Entertainment; Formats: CD, digital download	26	KOR: 412
Inner	Released: December 4, 2015; Label: Von Entertainment, NHN Entertainment; Formats: CD, digital download	54	—N/a
Voice	Released: November 11, 2016; Label: Von Entertainment, LOEN Entertainment; Formats: CD, digital download	47	—N/a
Poetic	Released: October 10, 2019; Label: Von Entertainment, Windmill Entertainment; Formats: CD, digital download	—	N/A
"—" denotes releases that did not chart.

=== Singles ===
Title	Year	Peak chart positions	Sales (DL)	Album
Title	Year	KOR	Sales (DL)	Album
"La La La"	2010	—	—N/a	With
"Farewell For You, Not Yet For Me" (넌 이별 난 아직) (feat. Han So-hyun)	2010	—	—N/a	With
"Have You Ever Been In Love?" (사랑에 빠져본 적 있나요) (feat. Ra.D)	2011	—	—N/a	With
"Fly" (경기국제항공전 테마송) (feat. Clover)	2011	—	—N/a	Non-album single
"Ache" (앓이) (feat. Windy)	2011	—	—N/a	Ballad With Windy
"One Love" (사랑한대) (feat. Windy)	2011	—	—N/a	Ballad With Windy
"Rest" (휴식)	2011	—	—N/a	Lucky
"Comfortable Relationship" (편한사이) (feat. Windy)	2011	—	—N/a	Non-album single
"Not Just Two" (둘이 아닌가봐) (feat. Christina Love Lee)	2012	80	KOR: 73,160	Like
"The Sunlight Hurts" (햇살이 아파) (feat. Han So-hyun)	2012	73	KOR: 41,297	Like
"Keep Going"	2012	—	—N/a	Shine
"An Old Song" (오래된 노래)	2012	6	KOR: 36,329	Shine
"A Perfect Day" (Forest Project Theme Song) (feat. Windy)	2012	—	—N/a	Ballad With Windy
"Everyday With You" (매일 그대를) (feat. Windy)	2012	—	—N/a	Ballad With Windy
"Stay There" (그 자리에 있어) (feat. Windy)	2012	60	KOR: 41,496	Ballad With Windy
"Because Of Different Times" (시간이 달라서)	2013	72	KOR: 41,247	Ambler
"Miss Flower	2013	—	KOR: 24,943	Ambler
"Once Again" (feat. Han So-hyun)	2013	46	KOR: 107,151	Shine
"Break Up for You, Not Yet for Me" (넌 이별 난 아직) (featuring Park Shin-hye and Hwasa) (Note: Credited as Maria)	2013	34	KOR: 95,026	Non-album single
"The Words I Love You" (사랑한다는 말)	2013	—	—N/a	Moment
"Confession" (고백)	2014	35	KOR: 124,988	36.5
"Lean On Me" (내게 기대) (feat. Park Se-young)	2014	17	KOR: 181,112	Non-album single
"Yes, You" (그래, 너)	2014	21	KOR: 146,275	36.5
"She Is Back"	2014	—	KOR: 24,263	Us
"It's Hanging" (맘에 걸려)	2014	84	KOR: 27,055	Us
"Kiss Me"	2014	—	KOR: 29,639	Us
"The Sunlight Hurts" (햇살이 아파) (feat. Wheein of Mamamoo, Yundak of OBroject)	2014	61	KOR: 24,384	Non-album single
"Starry Night"	2015	83	KOR: 34,732	Young
"Crazy"	2015	92	KOR: 36,159	Young
"Nobody Knows"	2015	99	KOR: 25,494	Inner
"Miss You"	2015	—	KOR: 24,859	Inner
"Rainbow" (무지개) (feat. Yundak of OBroject)	2016	21	KOR: 148,536	Non-album single
"Drip Drip Drip" (뚝뚝뚝) (feat. Yeseul)	2016	14	KOR: 176,980	Dramatic
"Summer Night You And I" (여름밤에 우린)	2016	1	KOR: 570,915	Dramatic
"Voice"	2016	55	KOR: 71,221	Voice
"Second Person" (두 번째 사람)	2016	—	KOR: 17,927	Voice
"I Thought of You" (네 생각 나더라)	2017	69	KOR: 64,699	Dramatic
"Cuz It's You" (너라면 괜찮아)	2017	36	KOR: 74,368	Dramatic
"Tonight" (오늘 밤은) (feat. Jisim)	2017	84	KOR: 39,729	Dramatic
"Fool" (바보야) (feat. Lee Hae-ri of Davichi)	2017	39	KOR: 86,561	Dramatic
"From the Star" (별의 조각)	2017	—	KOR: 13,687	Dramatic
"Travel to You" (너라는 세상)	2019	74	—N/a	Poetic
"A Song Only I Wanna Know" (나만 알고 싶은 노래)	2019	157	—N/a	Poetic
"I Know What Is the Love After Broke Up" (헤어져야 사랑을 알죠)	2020	94	—N/a	Non-album singles
"Distance" (멀어진 만큼)	2022	147	—N/a	Non-album singles
"—" denotes releases that did not chart.

=== Collaborations ===
Year	Title	Other artist(s)
2013	"Shall We Dance" (쉘 위 댄스)	Park Se-young
2017	"Those Were the Days"	OBroject

=== Soundtrack appearances ===
Year	Title	Album
2016	"I'll Pick You Up" (데리러 갈게)	Weightlifting Fairy Kim Bok-joo OST
2017	"How Would It Be?" (어떨까)	Strong Girl Bong-soon OST
2017	"Map of Heart" (마음의 지도)	Man to Man OST
2017	"Ordinary Day" (보통의 날)	Children of the 20th Century OST
2017	"You Are In My Heart" (넌 내 안에)	Andante OST
2018	"Always Be With You" (항상 너의 곁에 내가 있을게)	Feel Good to Die OST
2022	"Prettiest One" (너만 예뻐)	Soundtrack #1 OST
2023	"You're Precious" (그대가 소중해)	Twinkling Watermelon OST

== Awards and nominations ==
Year	Awards	Category	Recipient	Result
2014	Melon Music Awards	Best Indie Musician	"Lean on Me" (feat. Park Se-young)	Won
2015	Melon Music Awards	Best Indie Musician	"The Sunlight Hurts" (feat. Wheein of Mamamoo and Yundak of OBroject)	Won
2016	Golden Ticket Awards	Best Indie Musician	Standing Egg	Won
