= Say Yes (film) =

2001 South Korean film directed by Kim Seong-hong

- Theatrical poster
- Hangul: 세이 예스
- RR: Sei yeseu
- MR: Sei yesŭ
- Directed by: Kim Sung-hong
- Written by: Yeo Hye-young
- Produced by: Hwang Gi-seong
- Starring: Park Joong-hoon; Chu Sang-mi; Kim Joo-hyuk
- Cinematography: Lee Dong-sam
- Edited by: Park Gok-ji
- Music by: Jo Seong-woo
- Distributed by: Cinema Service
- Release date: August 17, 2001
- Running time: 105 minutes
- Country: South Korea
- Language: Korean

Say Yes (Korean: 세이 예스; RR: Sei yeseu) is a 2001 South Korean psychological thriller film.

== Plot ==
Young married couple Yoon-hee and Jung-hyun go on a road trip, and along the way they pick up a lone drifter, Em (or M) to aid him so he does not crash and get hurt.

Although M acts kind to the couple at first, as time goes on M turns out to be a violent and sadistic psychopath who torments and abuses the couple, who try in vain to escape him.

After capturing Jung-hyun, M gives him a choice: submit to torture and eventual death or watch and allow M to kill Yoon-hee.

== Cast ==
- Park Joong-hoon ... M
- Chu Sang-mi ... Yoon-hee
- Kim Joo-hyuk ... Jung-hyun
- Gi Ju-bong ... Manager
- Lee Chan-young ... Detective
- Hwang In-seong
- Park Yong-woo
- Kim Chae-yeon
- Lee Seok-gu
- Kim Jong-min
- Ryu Seung-soo

== Release ==
Say Yes was released in South Korea on 17 August 2001, and received a total of 55,200 admissions in Seoul.

== See also ==
- The Hitcher, a 1986 psychological thriller with a similar premise
