= Silla University =

Private university in Busan, South Korea

Coordinates: 35.1675°N 128.9967°E

- 신라대학교
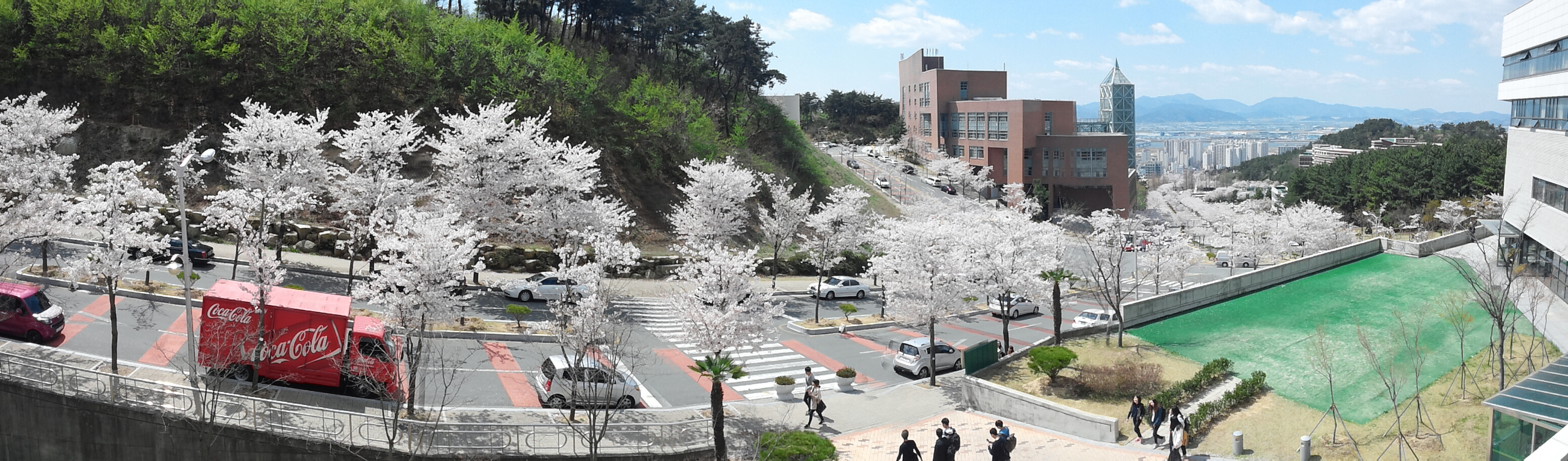
- View in front of Hwarang Hall (2014)
- Former names: Busan Women's University
- Motto: 진리 · 창조 · 사랑
- Motto in English: Truth, Creation, Love
- Type: Private university
- Established: 1954; 72 years ago
- Academic staff: Full-time faculty: 309 (2022)
- Students: 9,061 (2022)
- Undergraduates: 8,352 (2022)
- Postgraduates: 709 (2022)
- Location: 140 Baegyang-daero 700beon-gil, Sasang-gu, Busan, South Korea
- Colors: Blue

Silla University (Korean: 신라대학교) is a private university located in the second largest city of Busan, South Korea. To encourage international careers, collaborations and exchanges, Silla University maintains strong international links with 175 universities in 28 countries.

== Notable people ==
- Kim Chae-yeon, actress
