= Hongjacga =

South Korean webtoon artist (born 1980)

- 홍작가
- Born: Hong Seong-hyeok; 1980 (age 45–46); Seoul, South Korea
- Education: National Gugak High School
- Years active: 2006–present
- Organization: Korea Cartoonists Association
- Notable work: Dr. Brain; Delusion

Korean name
- Hangul: 홍성혁
- RR: Hong Seonghyeok
- MR: Hong Sŏnghyŏk

Pen name
- Hangul: 홍작가
- RR: Hongjakga
- MR: Hongjakka

Hongjacga (Korean: 홍작가; born in Seoul), is a South Korean webtoon artist. Hong began his career as a cartoonist in 2006 with the serialization of the webtoon Dorothy Band. In addition to comics, he works as an illustrator for various advertisements and books. His serialized works include Cat Funeral, Hwa-ja, It's Not Possible, Aneima, and Dr. Brain. He also worked on Lucasfilm's first official webtoon, Star Wars: The Story Before The Force Awakens. His works have been adapted into film, drama and musical.

== Early life and education ==
Born Hong Seong-hyeok in Seoul in 1980, he majored in daegeum at the National Gugak Middle School and High School in Gangnam, Seoul. Despite his musical studies, he was primarily recognized for his drawing skills.

== Career ==
After graduating from high school in 2002, he was recruited as animator for film My Beautiful Girl, Mari.

In 2006, he made his debut as a storyteller and webtoonist with the fantasy occult series Dorothy Band on Daum Webtoon. Inspired from The Wizard of Oz, the webtoon has minimal similarities to the original beyond its character archetypes and adventure structure. It has its own unique characters, including a guitarist scarecrow and a large cat named Tango.

Hong's 2011 webtoon, Hwaja, is set in the late 1980s and centers on Lee Yu. After encountering the mysterious Hwa-ja, Lee Yu is plagued by dreams of her. Years later, a cryptic message from a friend in a car accident draws the adult Lee Yu back to Hwaja's village. Published by Middle House, it received a strong reader rating of 9.7 on Daum.

Hong gained wider recognition after working on Lucasfilm's first official webtoon, "Star Wars: The Story Before The Force Awakens." Serialized on Daum Webtoon since April 2015, it was marketing content created by Disney in collaboration with Daum Webtoon. The webtoon was based on the story of Star Wars Episodes 4–6, released from 1977 to 1983.

In 2016, Hong created Dr. Brain. It amassed over 20 million views on Daum Webtoon and Kakao Page. The series centers on Se-won, a gifted brain scientist who, after a family tragedy, performs "brain syncs" with the deceased to access their memories and uncover the truth behind the mysterious accident.

Director Kim Jee-woon expressed interest in adapting the webtoon shortly after its completion. In May 2019, he officially began the development on the series with YG Studioplex, initially under the working title Mr. Robin. The project gained momentum, and by March 2021, actor Lee Sun-kyun was confirmed to star. This also marked a significant milestone as Apple acquired the series for its streaming service, Apple TV+, making it their inaugural Korean-language production. The six-episode series debuted on November 4, 2021, aligning with the Apple TV+ launch in South Korea, and concluded on December 9, 2021, with weekly episode releases.

The Space Sweepers Universe project began in 2019, originating from a decade-long concept by director Jo Sung-hee and Silk Road. From its inception, the project aimed to be a multimedia endeavor, with a webtoon planned alongside the film in collaboration with Merry Christmas and Kakao Page. Hongjacka was specifically brought in to develop the webtoon component of this ambitious universe. This project is a groundbreaking "IP collaboration" in Korea, as it's the first time a film and webtoon have branched concurrently from the same intellectual property. It's also notable as Korea's first "space opera." For Hongjacka, this undertaking offered a new experience.

Showbox announced in June 2021 plans to produce a drama based on Hongjacga's popular Naver webtoon, Delusion. By September of that year, director Han Jae-rim was already working on the series. It is a mystery horror period drama set in 1935 Gyeongseong and 1800s Shanghai, revolving around a mysterious vampire. The estimated production cost is said to be ₩45 billion. On May 23, 2025, Disney+ confirmed it would release Portraits of Delusion as an original series in 2026.

== Work ==
=== As animator ===
Film adapted from Hongjacka's webtoon
Year	Title		Director	Notes	Ref.
Year	English	Korean	Director	Notes	Ref.
2002	My Beautiful Girl, Mari	마리이야기	Lee Sung-gang		

=== As webtoon artist ===
Serial webtoons
Year	Title		Notes	Ref.
Year	English	Korean	Notes	Ref.
2006	Dorothy Band	도로시 밴드		
2009	The Cat Funeral	고양이 장례식		
2011	Hwaja	화자		
2012	What's not possible is not possible	안 되는 건 안 되는 거다		
2013	Anemia	아네미아		
2015	Star Wars: The Force Awakens	스타워즈: 깨어난 포스 그 이전의 이야기		
2016	Dr. Brain	Dr. 브레인		
2016	The Necromancer	네크로맨서		
2017	Wimp	—N/a		
2018	Ghost	고스트		
2019	Delusion	현혹		
2019	FLOWAR	플라워		
2020	Space Sweepers	승리호		
2021	Dr. Brain Season 2	Dr. 브레인 시즌2		
2021	Mechanical proliferation	기계증식증		
2023	Elf	엘프		
2024	Cold Blood	냉혈		

== Screen and stage adaptations ==
=== Film ===
Film adapted from Hongjacka's webtoon
Year	Title		Director	Notes	Ref.
Year	English	Korean	Director	Notes	Ref.
2015	The Cat Funeral	고양이 장례식	Lee Jong-hoon		

=== Web series ===
Web series adapted from Hongjacka's webtoon
Year	Title		Director	Notes	Ref.
Year	English	Korean	Director	Notes	Ref.
2021	Dr. Brain	Dr. 브레인	Kim Jee-woon		
2026	Portraits of Delusion	현혹	Han Jae-rim		

=== Musical ===
Musical adapted from Hongjacka's webtoon
Year	Title		Notes	Ref.
Year	English	Korean	Notes	Ref.
2021	Dorothy Band	도로시 밴드		
2026	Delusion	현혹		

== Accolades ==
As an animator, Hong contributed to an animated film that was awarded the Grand Prix (Best Feature Film) at the 26th Annecy International Animation Film Festival.

=== Awards and nominations ===
Awards and nominations
Year	Award	Category	Nominated work	Result	Ref.
2018	International Content Market SPP 2018	Best Creativity Award	Flowar	Won	
