= Park Se-young =

South Korean actress (born 1988)

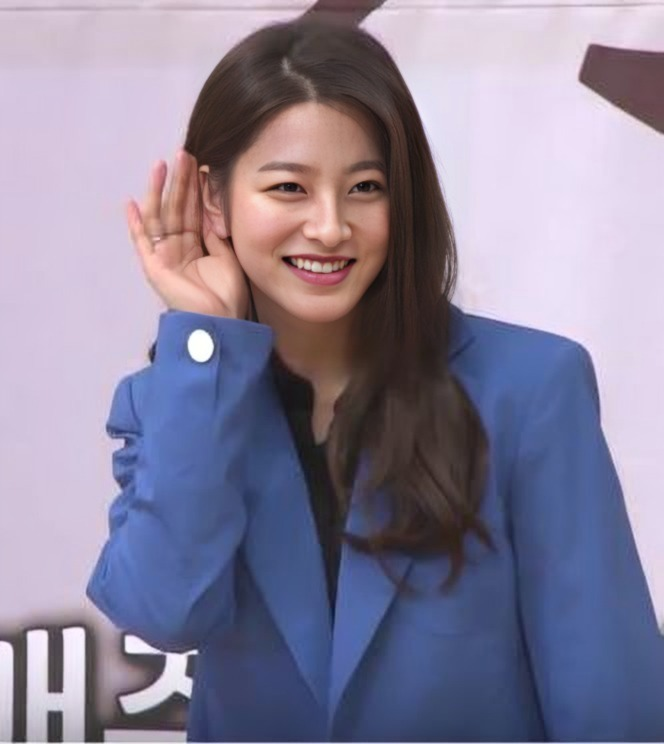
- Park in 2017
- Born: July 30, 1988 (age 38); Seoul, South Korea
- Education: Sangmyung University – Film and Media Studies
- Occupations: Actress; singer
- Years active: 2002–2003; 2011–present
- Agent: CL& Company
- Spouse: Kwak Jung-wook (m. 2022)
- Children: 1

Korean name
- Hangul: 박세영
- Hanja: 朴世榮
- RR: Bak Seyeong
- MR: Pak Seyŏng

Park Se-young (Korean: 박세영; born July 30, 1988) is a South Korean actress. She rose to fame in 2012 with supporting roles in the television dramas Faith and School 2013. Park has since played leading roles in A Tale Of Two Sisters (2013) and Glorious Day (2014), as well as the film The Cat Funeral (2015).

== Career ==
Park Se-young made her acting debut in a TV drama in 2002 when she was still a child, but left show business to concentrate on her studies. She returned to acting in 2011, and first drew attention after appearing in Jay Park's "Know Your Name (Acoustic)" music video. She then played supporting roles in family drama If Tomorrow Comes, revenge thriller Man from the Equator, melodrama Love Rain, period epic Faith, and teen drama School 2013.

In 2013, Park was cast in her first leading role in the daily drama A Tale of Two Sisters. She was also designated as one of the MCs on Music Bank.

Park appeared on the fourth season of We Got Married in 2014, a variety/reality show that paired celebrities into fake wedded couples (Park's partner was Jang Wooyoung from boyband 2PM). Another leading role followed in weekend drama Glorious Day. Park then starred in two webtoon film adaptations – Fashion King (2014) and The Cat Funeral (2015).

After ending a contract dispute with S.A.L.T Entertainment, Park signed with new agency Hunus Entertainment in 2015. The same year Park was cast in her villainous role in the daily drama My Daughter, Geum Sa-wol and she won Excellence Award, Actress in 9th Korea Drama Awards for her performance.

In 2016, Park starred in the medical thriller A Beautiful Mind.

After a supporting role in the 2017 legal thriller Whisper, Park played the leading role in melodrama Money Flower.

In June 2018, Park signed with new agency CL& Company.

In 2019, Park was cast in the comedy drama Special Labor Inspector as a judo athlete turned civil servant.

In 2022, Park is confirmed to make her small screen comeback after three years through tvN drama Mental Coach Jegal, for which she was cast along with Jung Woo, Lee Yoo-mi, and Kwon Yul.

== Personal life ==
On January 24, 2022, Park's agency confirmed that she and Kwak Jung-wook are getting married in mid-February, and the wedding ceremony will be held privately in Seoul. They had first become acquainted with one another after starring in School 2013. On January 7, 2025, it was confirmed that the couple was expecting their first child in June, and the child, a daughter, was born on May 13, 2025.

== Filmography ==
=== Television series ===
Year	Title	Role
2002	Inspector Park Mun-su	Yang Soo-kyung
2003	MBC Best Theater: "Do You Love Me?"	Yoon-ju
2011	If Tomorrow Comes	Seo Yoo-jin
2012	Man from the Equator	young Choi Soo-mi
2012	Love Rain	Lee Mi-ho
2012	Faith	Princess Noguk
2012	School 2013	Song Ha-kyung
2013	Flower Boys Next Door	new artist (cameo, episode 16)
2013	A Tale of Two Sisters	Choi Se-young
2014	Glorious Day	Jung Da-jung
2015	My Daughter, Geum Sa-wol	Oh Hye-sang
2016	A Beautiful Mind	Kim Min-jae
2017	Whisper	Choi Soo-yeon
2017	Money Flower	Na Mo-hyun
2019	Special Labor Inspector	Joo Mi-ran
2022	Mental Coach Jegal	Park Seung-ha
2026	Family Register	Na Ji-ni

=== Film ===
Year	Title	Role
2014	Fashion King	Park Hye-jin
2015	The Cat Funeral	Jae-hee

=== Variety show ===
Year	Title	Notes
2013	Music Bank	Host
2014	We Got Married – Season 4	with Jang Wooyoung (Episodes 204–237)
2016	Law of the Jungle in Mongolia	Cast member (Episodes 234–237)

=== Music video appearances ===
Year	Song title	Artist
2012	"Know Your Name" (Acoustic ver.)	Jay Park

== Discography ==
=== Singles ===
Year	Song title	Artist
2013	"Shall We Dance"	Standing Egg (feat. Park Se-young)
2014	"Holding Hands Together"	Jang Wooyoung & Park Se-young

== Awards and nominations ==
Year	Award	Category	Nominated work	Result	Ref.
2012	KBS Drama Awards	Best New Actress	Love Rain, Man from the Equator	Nominated	
2012	SBS Drama Awards	New Star Award	Faith	Won	
2013	49th Baeksang Arts Awards	Best New Actress (TV)	Faith	Nominated	
2013	KBS Drama Awards	Excellence Award, Actress in a Daily Drama	A Tale Of Two Sisters	Nominated	
2013	KBS Drama Awards	Best New Actress	A Tale Of Two Sisters	Nominated	
2014	SBS Drama Awards	Top Excellence Award, Actress in a Serial Drama	Glorious Day	Nominated	
2015	MBC Drama Award	Best New Actress in a Special Project Drama	My Daughter, Geum Sa-wol	Nominated	
2016	9th Korea Drama Awards	Excellence Award, actress	My Daughter, Geum Sa-wol	Won	
2017	SBS Drama Awards	Excellence Award, Actress in a Monday-Tuesday Drama	Whisper	Won	
2018	11th Korea Drama Awards	Excellence Award, actress	Money Flower	Nominated	
2018	6th APAN Star Awards	Excellence Award, Actress in a Serial Drama	Money Flower	Nominated	
2019	MBC Drama Awards	Excellence Award, Actress in a Monday-Tuesday Miniseries	Special Labor Inspector	Won	
