= Kim Chae-yeon (actress) =

South Korean actress (born 1977)

- Born: September 12, 1977 (age 49); Busan, South Korea
- Education: Silla University; Busan Dong Girls' High School
- Occupations: Actress; party planner
- Years active: 1999–2003, 2013–2015

Korean name
- Hangul: 김채연
- RR: Gim Chaeyeon
- MR: Kim Ch'aeyŏn

Kim Chae-yeon (Korean: 김채연; born September 12, 1977) is a South Korean actress. Kim was cast in the lead role in RNA (2000), Reservation for Love (2002) and Hello! Balbari (2003).

She changed her name in 2021 to Kim Seong-Gyeong.

== Filmography ==
=== Film ===
Year	Title	Role
2001	Say Yes	
2002	Break Out	

=== Television series ===
Year	Title	Role	Network
1999–2000	LA Arirang	Joo Da-young	SBS
2000	RNA	Hong Soo-ji	KBS2
2001	Pretty Lady	Jean Dokgo	KBS2
2001	Tender Hearts	Suh Mi-yun	KBS1
2002	Reservation for Love	Jang Seung-ri	MBC
2003	Hello! Balbari	Mi-na	KBS2
2013	A Tale of Two Sisters	Choi Yi-young	KBS1
2013	Nail Shop Paris	Geum Mi-rye	MBC Dramanet
2013	Fantasy Tower	Go Yoo-mi	tvN
2015	Flower of Queen	Shin Ji-soo	MBC

=== Music video appearances ===
Year	Artist	Title	Role
2000	Jo Sung-mo	"To the Next Person"	
2001	As One	"You're Welcome"	
