= Choi Soo-eun =

South Korean singer and actress (born 1985)

- 최문주
- Born: Choi Moon-ju; August 4, 1985 (age 41); Seoul, South Korea
- Other name: Choi Soo-eun
- Occupations: Actress; singer
- Years active: 2007–present
- Musical career
- Genre: K-pop
- Instrument: Vocals
- Years active: 2012–2013
- Label: MBK Entertainment (2009–2015)
- Formerly of: Gangkiz

Korean name
- Hangul: 최문주
- RR: Choe Munju
- MR: Ch'oe Munju

Stage name
- Hangul: 최수은
- RR: Choe Sueun
- MR: Ch'oe Suŭn

Choi Moon-ju (Korean: 최문주; born August 4, 1985), better known as Choi Soo-eun (최수은), is a South Korean actress and singer. She is a former member of South Korean girl group Gangkiz.

== Music career ==
Soo-eun debuted as a member of the girl group Gangkiz in 2012, their group released mini album "We Became Gang" and repackaged mini album "Mama" in the same year. A year later, she left the group and became an actress.

== Filmography ==
=== Television drama ===
Year	Title	Role	Network
2007	9 End 2 Outs	Herself (Cameo)	MBC
2009	You're Beautiful	Wang Ko-di	SBS
2009	Hon	Jang Mi-ra	MBC
2012	The King of Dramas	Yoon Bit-na	SBS

=== Television show ===
Year	Title
2007	Gogosing! Deonjeon School
2011	The Victory with doctor
