= Lee Hae-in (actress) =

South Korean singer and actress (born 1986)

Lee Ji
- 이지영
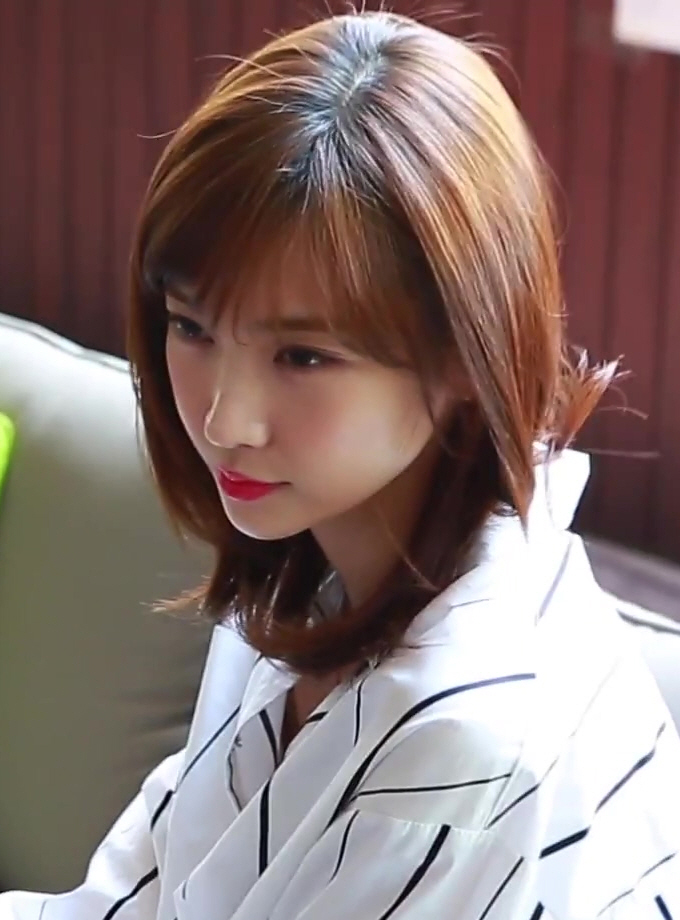
- Lee in 2016
- Born: Lee Ji-young; April 19, 1986 (age 40); Masan, South Korea
- Other names: Lee Hae-in (formerly); Leezy
- Occupations: Actress; singer; pianist
- Years active: 2007–present
- Musical career
- Genre: K-pop
- Instrument: Vocals
- Years active: 2012–2013
- Formerly of: Gangkiz

Korean name
- Hangul: 이지영
- Hanja: 李芝英
- RR: I Jiyeong
- MR: I Chiyŏng

Lee Ji-young (born April 19, 1986), known as Lee Ji, is a South Korean actress, singer and pianist. She is a former member of South Korean girl group Gangkiz.

== Biography ==
Hae-in was born as Lee Ji-young on April 19, 1986, in Masan, South Korea. She has studied at Masan Gapo High School and Seoul Arts National University.

== Music career ==
Hae-in debuted as a member of the girl group Gangkiz in 2012; their group released the mini album We Became Gang and repackaged mini album Mama in the same year. A year later, she left the group and became an actress.

Since September 2020, Hae-in started to post piano-playing videos on YouTube.

== Filmography ==
=== Film ===
Year	Title	Role	Ref.
2011	Quick	Chun-shim's alumni	
2016	Female Wars: The Man Who Moved In	Min-jeong	
2019	Gangsters	Soo-yeon	

=== Television series ===
Year	Title	Role	Ref.
2007	HIT		
2007	Drama City: "Einstein Found Love"		
2010	Golden Fish	Seo Joo-hee	
2011	Welcome to the Show	assistant director	
2011	Vampire Idol	Hae-in	
2012	Bayside Shakedown: Special	Shin Soo-hyeon	
2012	Five Fingers	Jung So-yeol	
2013	A Tale of Two Sisters	Lee Ye-rin	
2014	Inspiring Generation	Seon Woo-jin	
2015	The Three Witches	Moon Hee-jae	
2018	A Poem a Day	Park Yeon-hee (Cameo)	

=== Music video appearances ===
Year	Song title	Artist	Ref.
2012	"Lovey-Dovey"	T-ara	
2013	"Bikini"	T-ara, Davichi (feat. Skull)	

== Theater ==
Years	Title	Ref.
2011	Coyote Ugly	
