= Glorious Day (TV series) =

- Promotional poster
- Also known as: Very Good Day; Feel-Good Day
- Genre: Romance; Family; Drama
- Written by: Moon Hee-jung
- Directed by: Hong Sung-chang
- Starring: Park Se-young; Lee Sang-woo; Kim Mi-sook; Hwang Woo-seul-hye
- Country of origin: South Korea
- Original language: Korean
- No. of episodes: 44

Production
- Executive producers: Kim Young-sup; Lee Jang-soo
- Producers: Jo Eun-jung; Im Byung-hoon
- Running time: 60 minutes
- Production company: Logos Film

Original release
- Network: SBS TV
- Release: 26 April – 5 October 2014

Glorious Day (Korean: 기분 좋은날; RR: Gibun joeunnal; lit. Good Day) is a 2014 South Korean weekend television drama series starring Park Se-young, Lee Sang-woo, Kim Mi-sook, Hwang Woo-seul-hye, and Go Woo-ri. It premiered on April 26, 2014, airing on SBS every Saturday and Sunday at 20:45 for 44 episodes.

== Plot ==
Han Song-jung is a novelist and single mother. She raised three daughters on her own and is determined to marry them off to decent men. But in the end, Song-jung finds herself getting married as well.

Jung Da-ae is the eldest daughter; she is the perfect bride material—not only beautiful and smart, she also helped raise her younger sisters with loving care. Jung Da-jung is the middle daughter, a girl overflowing with warmth and boundless optimism, who cheers up anyone around her. Jung Da-in is the youngest daughter.

The family next door runs a rice cake store, and their eldest grandson is Seo Jae-woo. Jae-woo earns a steady income as a salaryman at a large company, and has some brusque and conservative traits he inherited from his grandfather, but also some sweet gentlemanly traits from his father. It makes him rather stuffy and old-fashioned, but he's a good guy, and becomes romantically involved with Da-jung.

== Cast ==
- Park Se-young as Jung Da-jung
- Lee Sang-woo as Seo Jae-woo
- Kim Mi-sook as Han Song-jung
- Hwang Woo-seul-hye as Jung Da-ae
- Go Woo-ri as Jung Da-in
- Son Chang-min as Namgung Young
- Choi Bool-am as Kim Chul-soo
- Na Moon-hee as Lee Soon-ok
- Kang Seok-woo as Seo Min-sik
- Lee Mi-young as Kim Shin-ae
- Kim Hyung-kyu as Seo In-woo
- Jung Man-sik as Kang Hyun-bin
- Kim Min-young as Mina
- Jung Hye-sung as Lee So-yi
- Lee Hong-bin as Yoo Ji-ho
- Kwak Si-yang as Jung Hee-joo
- Kang Nam-gil as Da-jung's father
- Leo as himself (Ep. 43)
- Hyuk as himself (Ep. 43)
- Jeon Soo-kyeong as House owner (cameo)

== Awards and nominations ==
Year	Award	Category	Recipient	Result
2014	22nd SBS Drama Awards	Top Excellence Award, Actor in a Serial Drama	Lee Sang-woo	Nominated
2014	22nd SBS Drama Awards	Top Excellence Award, Actress in a Serial Drama	Park Se-young	Nominated
2014	22nd SBS Drama Awards	Special Award, Actor in a Serial Drama	Kang Seok-woo	Nominated
2014	22nd SBS Drama Awards	Special Award, Actress in a Serial Drama	Kim Mi-sook	Nominated
