= Space Battle Lunchtime =

Comic Book

- Cover to issue #1; Art by Natalie Riess

Publication information
- Publisher: Oni Press
- Schedule: Monthly
- Format: Ongoing series
- Publication date: May 2016

Creative team
- Written by: Natalie Riess
- Artist: Natalie Riess

Collected editions
- Lights, Camera, Snacktion!: ISBN 1620103133
- A Recipe for Disaster: ISBN 1620104040
- A Dish Best Served Cold: ISBN 9781620107850

Space Battle Lunchtime is an American comic book created by Natalie Riess and published through Oni Press. The first issue of the eight-issue monthly miniseries was released May 4, 2016. The story is about Peony, a young pastry chef who is chosen to participate in an interstellar cooking competition.

== Publication history ==
Riess, creator of the webcomic Snarlbear, originally planned to pitch Space Battle Lunchtime to webcomic host Hiveworks, but it was too short. Instead, she was one of 2,500 creators who sent a proposal to Oni Press during their 2015 open submission window. Her pitch used the log line: "Space Battle Lunchtime is a comic about a young pastry chef from Earth who enters an intergalactic TV cooking competition. Think of it as a delicious combo of goofy science fiction, shōjo manga and Food Network". When it was accepted by Oni editor Robin Herrera, who had specifically requested a food comic from applicants, it became the first contracted project from the submission pool.

Space Battle Lunchtime was a working title, but Riess never thought of a good replacement. After publication, she said she wished she had chosen something shorter. She began with a "flexible idea" of how the space world would work and decided on the details as the story progressed. The initial plan was to tell the story in a short graphic novel, but it was changed to be an eight-issue miniseries. Riess researched Food Network shows, magazine photos, and animation from Studio Ghibli movies for the steps involved in making dishes and how they look at each stage of the process. The extraterrestrial food gave her many opportunities to draw different substances and textures, which is one of her interests.

The first issue was released May 4, 2016. It had four variant covers: two by Riess, one by Leila del Duca, and one by Carey Pietsch. Sales were estimated just below 5000 copies. The series has been collected into two trade paperbacks. A new edition of the first issue was released at a discounted retail price to coincide with the release of the second collection.

A third trade paperback was released on October 6, 2020.

== Critical reception ==
The art received mostly positive reviews, although some critics said the plot was slow or thin.

The first issue received an average score of 7.4 out of 10 based on 9 critical reviews as review aggregation website Comic Book Roundup. It received attention for its focus on food preparation, a subject largely ignored in American comics. Although some reviewers found the plot thin or slow, the art received mostly positive comments. Multiversity Comics called it "dynamic" and Comics Worth Reading described it as "purposely unpolished". Adventures in Poor Taste reviewer David Brooke liked the creative panel layouts, and Jon Erik Christianson praised Riess' use of color to convey emotion in his review for Panels.net. Oliver Sava, a reviewer for The A.V. Club, said Space Battle Lunchtime "features a strong, confident, and creative vision that is extremely impressive considering Riess’ youth".
