= MARC USA =

Advertising agency

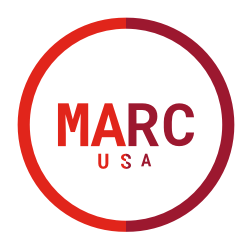
- Type: Privately Held
- Industry: Advertising/Media
- Founded: 1955
- Headquarters: 225 W. Station Square Drive; Pittsburgh, Pennsylvania
- Key people: Tony Bucci (Chairman & CEO); Michele Fabrizi (President/CEO, Advertising Division); Cari Bucci Hulings (EVP/General Manager); Chris Heitmann (EVP/Chief innovation Officer); Karen Leitze (EVP/Research & Strategic Planning); Dave Buklarewicz (EVP/Media Director)
- Number of employees: 250
- Website: www.marcusa.com

MARC USA is a privately held United States–based advertising agency with more than $350 million in billings and 250 employees. MARC USA operates full-service offices in Chicago, Illinois, Boston, Massachusetts, and Pittsburgh. MARC USA also partners with MARCA Hispanic in Miami, Florida.

Clients include Rite Aid, True Value Hardware, Cooper Tire & Rubber Company, and Pennsylvania Lottery MARC USA is headquartered in Pittsburgh, Pennsylvania.

It has done pro-bono campaigns for the Andy Warhol Museum and Pittsburgh Opera.

MARC USA is also recognized for its philanthropic work, having undertaken pro-bono campaigns for institutions such as the Andy Warhol Museum and the Pittsburgh Opera. This indicates the agency's involvement in supporting cultural and artistic endeavors within its community.

== Management ==
- Tony Bucci – Chairman
- Cari Bucci –
- Dave Buklarewicz – Executive Media Director
- TJ Crawford – Digital Strategy, MarTech and Analytic Solutions Director
- Amy Nixon – Strategy Director
- Jon Galatis – Group Account Director
- Matt Sullivan – Group Creative Director
- Josh Blasingame – Group Creative Director
- Karen Leitze – Research Director
- Josh Magcarty – of Analytics and Data Science
- Jenny Brenner – Associate Director
- Jerry Thompson – Public Relations Director
- Patti Mulligan – Director of Digital Delivery
- Barbara Stefanis-Israel – Director of Marketing
- Jason Haag –
- Sadie Barlow – Media Director
- Snake Roth – of Integrated Production
