= Alex Woolfson =

American comics writer and publisher

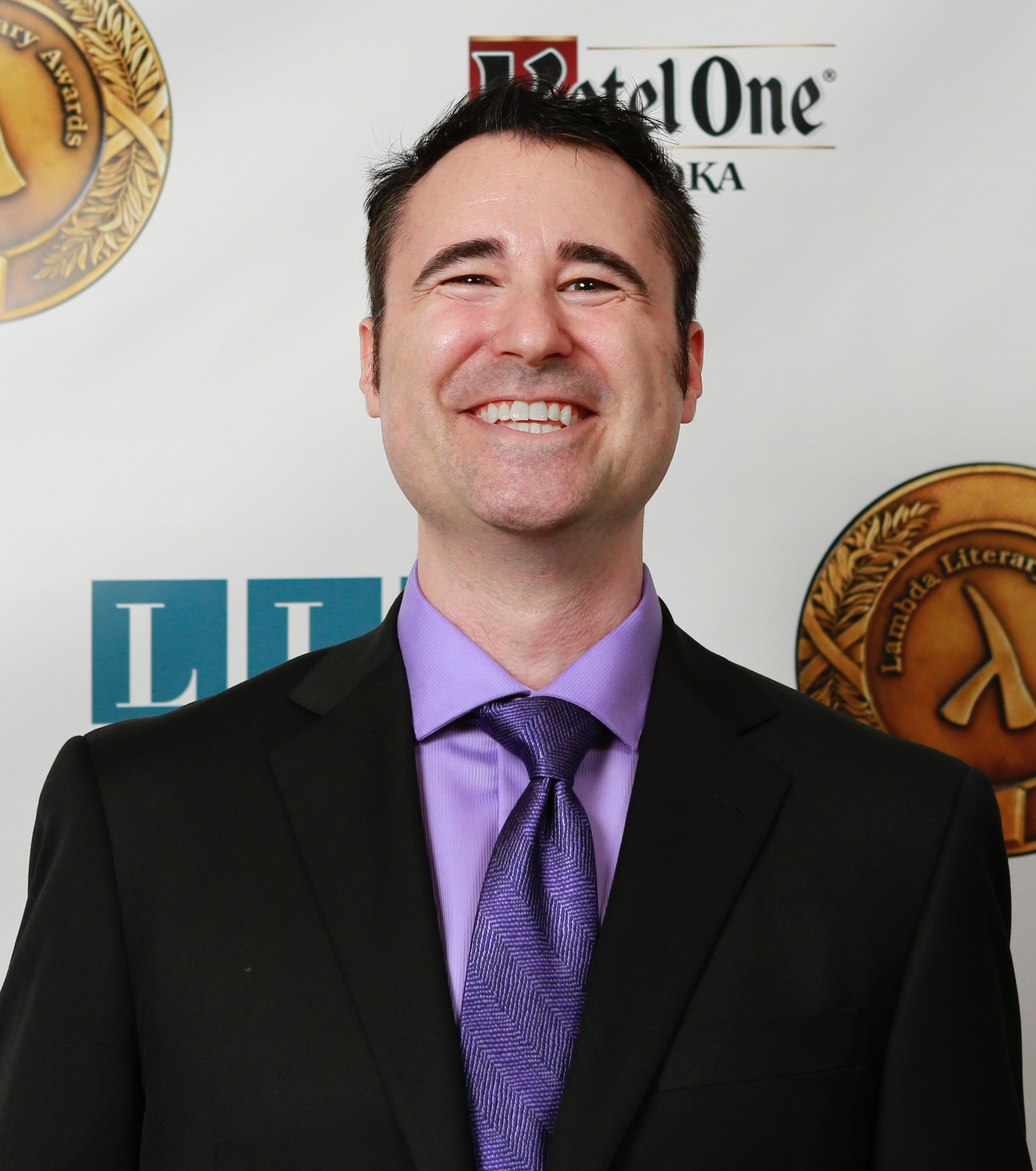
- Alex Woolfson at Lambda Literary Awards 2014
- Born: Alex Woolfson Vermont
- Areas: Writer, Publisher
- Notable works: Artifice; The Young Protectors

Alex Woolfson is an American comics writer and publisher, known for his graphic novels Artifice (with illustrator Winona Nelson) and The Young Protectors (with Adam DeKraker and Veronica Gandini), and his Young Protectors Webcomics site. Woolfson is openly gay.

== Biography ==
Woolfson grew up in Vermont, and pursued playwriting in college. After moving to the San Francisco Bay Area and making a short film – he also works as a video editor – he turned his attention to writing comics, as a more practical medium for him to be able to tell the stories he wanted to write. His first comic was titled "A Shot in the Dark", which Woolfson describes as a "magic school rescue story".

His first long-form work was Artifice, which he serialized on his blog Yaoi 911, before publishing it in print. Illustrated by Winona Nelson, it's the story of an android assassin who falls in love with the young man his owners assign him to kill. The book was a finalist for a Lambda Literary Award for LGBT Graphic Novel in 2014.

Woolfson followed up on this in 2012 by beginning The Young Protectors, an ongoing superhero story illustrated by Adam DeKraker, with colors by Veronica Gandini (a 2011 Harvey Award nominee). This series is about a teenage, closeted gay superhero (a member of the titular team) who finds himself in a conflicted relationship with a middle-aged gay supervillain. He has published a print collection of the first part of the series as The Young Protectors: Engaging the Enemy. As of 2020, three story arcs have been completed: Engaging the Enemy with five chapters, Legendary with two and Spooky Jones: Past Sins with one, with a fourth one (Double-Cross) ongoing publication, and a teaser for a fifth one (Fallen).

He has financed the publication of print volumes through Kickstarter, reaching the funding goal for the first Young Protectors volume in less than 24 hours.
