= Snarlbear =

Webcomic by Natalie Riess

- Author: Natalie Riess
- Website: www.snarlbear.com
- Current status/schedule: Concluded
- Launch date: May 21, 2012
- End date: February 10, 2017
- Genre: Fantasy

Snarlbear is a 2012 webcomic by Natalie Riess. It follows the adventures of a teenage girl who is transported to a fantasy world, where she becomes a monster hunter.

== Synopsis ==
Snarlbear follows a teenage grocery store employee named Daisy who is transported to another world, the Rainbow Dimension. After fighting and killing a bear monster, she is dubbed "Snarlbear" and becomes a professional monster hunter. She is joined by the elf Flint, who appoints himself her agent and manager. The two become involved in a conflict between the exiled unicorn prince Narcisso and his usurper sister Cassiopeia. Meanwhile, Snarl finds herself becoming absorbed in violence.

== Development ==
Riess started Snarlbear with the intention of it being a relatively short project in order to produce a complete story and improve her art skills. She created the setting of the Rainbow Dimension in order to practice coloring. According to Riess, she became more serious about the comic after joining Hiveworks in 2015.

When beginning the comic, Riess made a rough outline of each chapter, which was deliberately flexible to allow for later changes. Each chapter was scripted and thumbnailed before the process of page-drawing began.

Riess began developing Space Battle Lunchtime while working on Snarlbear.

== Reception ==
io9 and ComicsBeat remarked on the comic's bright yet sinister setting. ComicsBeat noted the expressionist use of color in emphasizing mood and action, and praised the monster designs.
