= Doe-Anderson Inc. =

American advertising agency

Doe-Anderson
- Company type: Employee-owned advertising agency
- Industry: Advertising, Marketing
- Founded: 1915
- Founder: Elmer H. Doe
- Headquarters: Louisville, KY, U.S., Columbus, OH, U.S.
- Key people: Todd Spencer (Executive Chairman); John Birnsteel (Chief Executive Officer); Leyla Touma Dailey (President, Chief Creative Officer); Brittany Campisano (Chief Financial Officer); Lee Dorsey (President, Chief Operations Officer)
- Services: Communications, brand positioning, strategic planning, creative execution, media buying and planning digital services, print and broadcast production, public relations.
- Number of employees: 140
- Website: www.doeanderson.com

Doe-Anderson is one of the oldest continuously operating advertising agencies in the United States; and it is the oldest independent agency in the US. The agency has served some of its clients for more than 50 years, including Maker's Mark bourbon and Hillerich & Bradsby, makers of Louisville Slugger bats and equipment. In business since 1915, Doe-Anderson currently has 130+ employees and offers communication services including brand positioning, strategic planning, creative execution, media buying and planning, digital services, print and broadcast production and public relations. The agency is a member of the Advertising and Marketing International Network (AMIN), and of the American Association of Advertising Agencies (4A's).

In 2024, the agency earned B Corp certification joining a global network of businesses who have met high standards for social and environmental impact. Doe-Anderson also official updated their registration to a Public Benefits Corporation (PBC).

== Background ==
Doe-Anderson was founded as the Elmer H. Doe Agency in 1915 after Elmer Doe left his post as J. Walter Thompson Copy Chief when he met and married a woman in Louisville, Kentucky In 1925, Doe hired family friend and former paint salesman Warwick Anderson as an unpaid copy trainee. After attempting to fire him multiple times, Doe took a liking to Anderson and promoted him to partner on January 1, 1934. The agency officially changed its name to Doe-Anderson in 1939 and was incorporated in 1958.

The agency uses an acorn as its symbol, representing the concept that ideas can develop into business-changing forces. Or, as Warwick Anderson related it, "Giant oaks from tiny acorns grow."

Though Doe-Anderson has always been headquartered in Louisville, its street address has changed many times. When the agency opened in 1915, it was located in the Keller Building. Doe-Anderson moved to the Columbia Building in 1927, to the Starks Building in 1932, and to the Martin Brown Building in 1936. After the Ohio River Flood of 1937, the agency moved to the Commonwealth Building where it stayed until moving to a Victorian home on East Broadway in 1972. After a stint on Main Street, home to whiskey row, Doe Anderson moved to 680 S. 4th Street on the same land they once occupied in the 1930s. In 2016 a branch location of Doe Anderson was opened in Columbus, Ohio at 629 N. High Street.

== History ==
- In 1950, Doe-Anderson hired Louisville's first female media director, Pat Porter.
- In 1958, Warwick Anderson established the Doe-Anderson Profit Sharing Trust, offering company equity to all employees.
- Doe-Anderson won the Hillerich & Bradsby account in 1971, beginning its long relationship with the Louisville Slugger brand. The agency still holds this account today, with H&B brands now including Bionic Gloves and PowerBilt Golf.
- In 1973, Doe-Anderson began working with Maker's Mark.
- The agency ran its first advertisement featuring an A-list celebrity in 1981, a radio campaign for North American Van Lines starring Orson Welles.
- In 1985, the agency opened Kentucky's first separate public relations division, which still operates today.
- In 1988, Doe-Anderson's TV campaign for Ashland Oil, which promoted keeping kids in school, was honored for its effectiveness by being read into the US Congressional Record, and by being incorporated into a nationwide public service campaign. Ashland Oil was also invited to a ceremony at the White House in recognition of its efforts.
- After the Affordable Care Act passed, Kentucky became the only Southern state to host its own health benefit exchange. In 2013, the Commonwealth of Kentucky awarded Doe-Anderson a multimillion-dollar contract to market kynect – the state's first-ever health benefit exchange – to Kentuckians. kynect has since been cited as a national success story and was praised by President Barack Obama in his State of the Union address.
- In 2013, Doe-Anderson received international acclaim for its "Prepare for Real Life" campaign for Mercy Academy. The campaign was featured on NBC's TODAY show, among other national and international outlets.
- For Doe-Anderson's 100th anniversary in business, Louisville's Frazier History Museum is showcasing the firm's history with the exhibit "The Power of Persuasion: 100 Years of Doe-Anderson" from August 1, 2015, to February 14, 2016.
- The All Hands Black Owned Small Business Program was launched in 2023 offering pro-bono services to local business owners.
- In 2024, ADWEEK covered Doe-Anderson's 50-year client-agency relationship with iconic bourbon brand, Maker's Mark.

== Awards and achievements ==
- Ad Age Small Agency Awards
  - Healthcare Campaign of the Year, Silver, OhioHealth, "Keep Making Plans", 2024
  - Executive of the Year, Leyla Touma Dailey, Chief Creative Officer, 2024
- David Ogilvy Award, Silver, Beverages and Alcohol, Maker's Mark, "It Is What it Isn't," 2012
- Effie Awards,
  - Finalist, Healthcare Services/Health & Wellness, OhioHealth, "Keep Making Plans", 2023
  - Gold, Government, Institutional & Recruitment, kynect: Kentucky's Healthcare Connection, "kynect: For Every Kentuckian", 2015
  - Bronze, Beverage and Alcohol Spirits, Maker's Mark, "Stories," 2003
- Graphis' Advertising Annual Showcases Award, Gold, Promotion, "Maker's Mark Ambassador Holiday Mailer," 2012
- Muse Creative Awards
  - 6x Gold & 2 silver, 2024
  - 3x Gold & 2 Silver, 2023
- OBIE Awards
- David Ogilvy Award, Silver, Beverages and Alcohol, Maker's Mark, "It Is What it Isn't," 2012
- PRSA Silver Anvil Award, 1997
- Shorty Award, Best Use of a Promoted Tweet, Promoted Trend or Promoted Account, 2012
- Best Advertising Agency in Kentucky, Adweek, 2013
- CLIO Award, North American Van Lines, 1981

== Notable campaigns ==
- American Air Filter, "Pollution Control," "Silencing Systems," "Stop Static," etc.
- Ashland Oil, "You Have the Power"
- First National Bank of Louisville (later National City, now PNC Bank)
- Fischer Packing, "Good Dog," "Eggs Benefit," etc.
- Commonwealth of Kentucky, "Introducing kynect: Kentucky's Health Benefit Exchange."
- kynect: Kentucky's Healthcare Connection, "kynect: For Every Kentuckian"
- Louisville Slugger, "The Bat of Champions"
- Maker's Mark, "Stories," "Welcome to the North End," "South Station Domination," etc.
- Mercy Academy, "Prepare for Real Life"
- North American Van Lines, "Take Charge"
- Paramount Pickles, "The Pickles Pickle People Pick"

== Featured celebrities ==
- Hank Aaron (Louisville Slugger)
- Lou Brock (Louisville Slugger)
- John Calipari (Maker's Mark, Northwestern Mutual)
- James Carville (Maker's Mark)
- Phyllis Diller (Paramount Pickles)
- Jimmy Fallon (Maker's Mark)
- Jeff Foxworthy (Shoney's)
- Josh Hamilton (Louisville Slugger)
- Kid Rock (Jim Beam)
- Harmon Killebrew (Louisville Slugger)
- Mila Kunis (Jim Beam)
- William H. Macy (First National Bank)
- Mary Matalin (Maker's Mark)
- Stan Musial (Louisville Slugger)
- Rick Pitino (Maker's Mark, Northwestern Mutual)
- Pee Wee Reese (Louisville Slugger)
- Enos Slaughter (Louisville Slugger)
- Bobby Thompson (Louisville Slugger)
- Orson Welles (North American Van Lines)
- Ted Williams (Louisville Slugger)
- Robin Yount (Louisville Slugger)
