= Ava's Demon =

2012 science-fantasy webcomic

- Logo used for the Kickstarter campaign
- Author: Michelle Czajkowski Fus
- Website: www.avasdemon.com
- Current status/schedule: Sporadic
- Launch date: 2012
- Genre(s): Sci-fi, Fantasy

Ava's Demon is a science fantasy webcomic written and drawn by Michelle Czajkowski Fus and colored by a number of colorists. The comic, which has been ongoing since 2012, is known for its painted art style and animations. The first physical publication of Ava's Demon was released in 2013 after a successful Kickstarter project, and another Kickstarter in 2020 became the most-backed webcomic Kickstarter at the time.

== Premise ==
Ava's Demon is set in the year 3031 AD, in a universe of interplanetary travel and advanced medical science, where some people have obtained god-like powers through science. The comic follows Ava Ire, a teenager that has a personal demon that has tormented her since her birth. The demon, Wrathia, can briefly possess her and make her scream violent insanities, and has urged her to commit suicide.

After Ava comes close to death, Wrathia reveals what she truly is – the ghost of an alien queen – and offers Ava a pact. The pact requires Ava to bind more closely to Wrathia, and to help Wrathia defeat a being with numerous followers. Wrathia seeks revenge on Titan, a god-like figure who destroyed Wrathia's empire. Ava also learns that other people have demons as well.

== Development ==
=== Inspiration ===
Fus said that they wanted to create comics since childhood, but to make money went into 3D animation and worked for both Pixar and DreamWorks. While interning at Pixar, they were taught the process of creating successful stories. Fus started working on Ava's Demon during their spare time while working at DreamWorks – at the time, they did not expect it to make a sustainable career. Fus described the original idea for Ava's Demon as "a collage of stuff I’ve absorbed that I really like, like The Fifth Element and Alien and Kubrick films."

=== Production and format ===
According to its website, the art of Ava's Demon, Fus' illustrations are colored by Fus and five "official colorists", two of whom also run their own webcomics.

The webcomic includes some pages which are a single panel, advanced by a button, which io9 said "give [their] comic a rhythmic, almost animated quality." In addition, occasional panels are animated, and some key scenes have more elaborate animations, played over music on Vimeo and YouTube videos.

=== Physical printing ===
In 2013, Fus started a crowdfunding project through Kickstarter to self-publish the first volume of Ava's Demon. Besides a full-color book, Fus offered downloads for the animated comics. The webcomic successfully raised $217,036 USD by June 2013. In 2015, another Kickstarter campaign was launched to publish the second volume of Ava's Demon, as well as to re-print the first volume. Along with donation perks, an animated chapter video would be created by Studio Yotta, known for their animated videos for internet comedy group Starbomb. The campaign was successfully funded.

Fus has opened up a shop for Ava's Demon where the first two books can be purchased, alongside a variety of printed art and novelty items. Fus is active on a variety of social platforms including Twitter, Instagram, Tumblr, and Discord. On their Twitter, Fus posts update announcements as well as any notices about hiatuses the comic will take.

In 2020, it was announced the comic would be republished by Skybound Entertainment. A Kickstarter campaign was held for a new hardcover edition of the first volume. It became the most-funded webcomic Kickstarter, later beaten by Check, Please!

== Reception ==
In a 2013 review, Lauren Davis of io9 said that the comic "promises to be a funny and gorgeous epic", saying that the multimedia experience complements Fus' sense of humor and that she enjoyed the surreal aspects of Fus' storytelling. Davis described the comic as "gorgeous," but specified that Ava's Demon is "more than just a pretty face." Paste Magazine rated Ava's Demon among the best webcomics of 2014 for the way it combined "gorgeous panels with an intriguing story," and in 2015, Juliet Kahn of ComicsAlliance described Ava's Demon as "one of the most luminously lovely comics currently produced."

Kris Straub, creator of various webcomics, praised Ava's Demon for its animation and its painted look.

By 2015, Ava's Demon had raised over half a million dollars over two Kickstarter campaigns.
