= It's Geek 2 Me =

Technology-themed comic strip

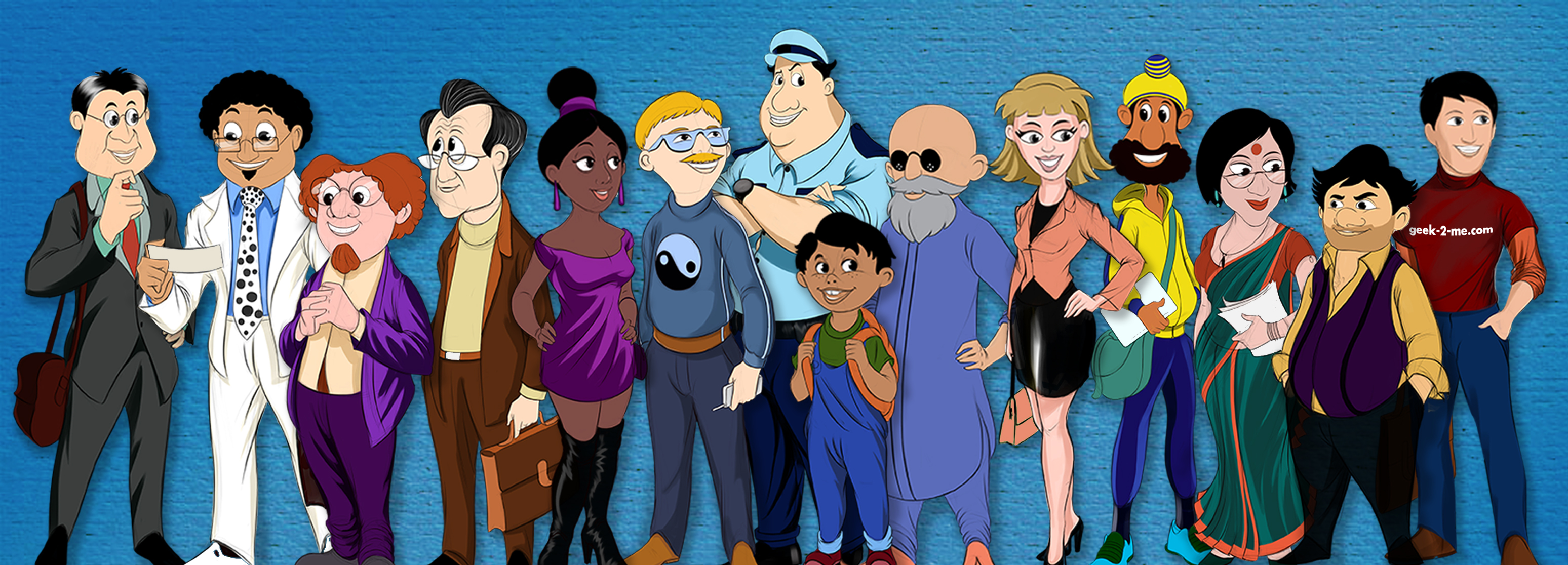
- The strip's fictional technology-company employees
- Author: Francis Cleetus
- Genre: Technology humor

It's Geek 2 Me is a technology-themed comic strip created by Pittsburgh cartoonist Francis Cleetus.

== Premise ==
The strip is set at the fictional Paradox Software Corporation. Its humor concerns people's interactions with technology, including computers, the Internet, smartphones, social networks, gaming devices, e-book readers and GPS systems. Cleetus said that its characters and stories were inspired by his experiences.

== Collections ==
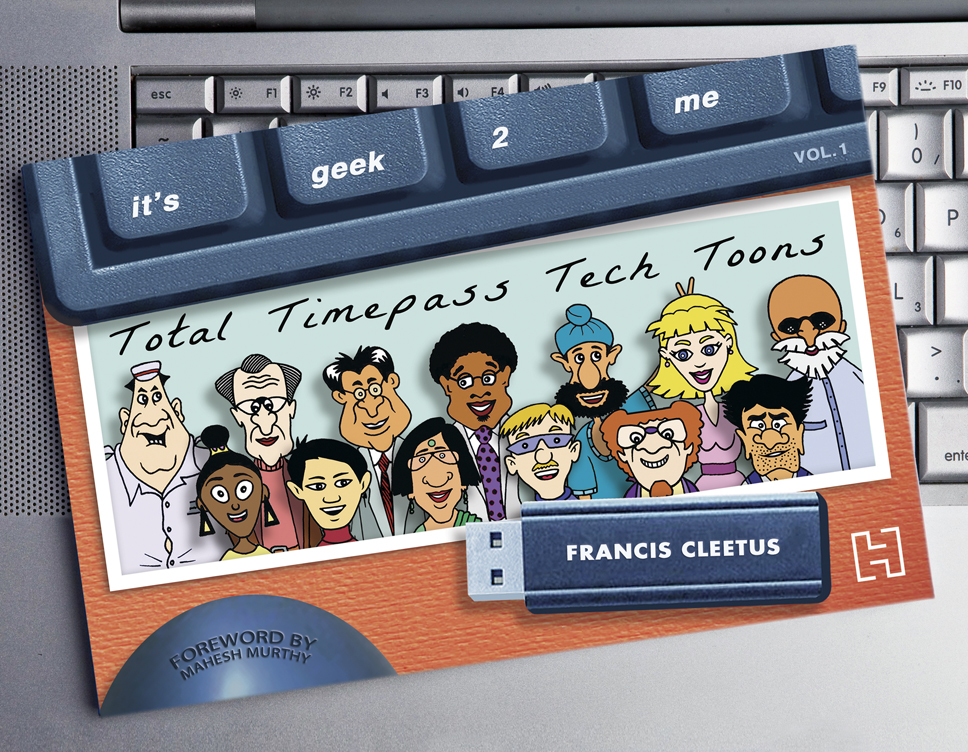
The 2013 collection It's Geek 2 Me: Total Timepass Tech Toons

Wish Your Mouth Had a Backspace Key, a collection of cartoons from the online strip, was launched at the Toonseum in downtown Pittsburgh in 2012. Hachette India published It's Geek 2 Me: Total Timepass Tech Toons in 2013.

- Wish Your Mouth Had a Backspace Key (2012; ISBN 978-1449587123)
- Cleetus, Francis (2013). It's Geek 2 Me: Total Timepass Tech Toons (PDF). Hachette India. ISBN 978-9350096246 – via Hachette India catalogue.
