= A Tale of Two Sisters (TV series) =

2013 South Korean television series

- Also known as: Sincerity is the Way of Heaven; Faith Moves Heaven; Moving Heaven
- Genre: Drama, Romance, Family
- Written by: Kim Hyun-hee; Kang Sung-jin
- Directed by: Kim Myung-wook
- Starring: Park Se-young; Lee Hae-in; Yoo Gun; Park Jae-jung
- Composer: Jung Sang-hoon
- Country of origin: South Korea
- Original language: Korean
- No. of episodes: 135

Production
- Executive producer: Kim Hyung-il
- Cinematography: Wi Chang-seok
- Editor: Kim Choong-yeol
- Running time: 30 minutes

Original release
- Network: KBS1
- Release: 29 April – 1 November 2013

A Tale of Two Sisters (Korean: 지성이면 감천; RR: Jiseongimyeon gamcheon; lit. Sincerity Moves Heaven) is a 2013 South Korean television daily drama starring Park Se-young, Lee Hae-in, Yoo Gun, and Park Jae-jung. It aired on KBS1 from April 29 to November 1, 2013, airing every Monday to Friday at 20:25 for 135 episodes.

== Plot ==
Choi Se-young works part-time for a broadcasting company, and dreams of becoming an announcer. She was adopted when she was a young child. After she reunites with her birth mother, she becomes torn between her adoptive family and biological family. She goes through hardships between Yerin, but still forgives her.

== Cast ==
=== Main characters ===
- Park Se-young as Choi Se-young / Lee Yeon-joo (27)
- Lee Hae-in as Lee Ye-rin / Kim Shin-hye (27)
- Yoo Gun as Han Jae-sung (30)
- Park Jae-jung as Ahn Jung-hyo (30)

=== Supporting characters ===
Choi Se-young's family

- Jung Hye-sun as Shim Ae-gi (80)
- Lee Ki-young as Choi Jin-sa (60)
- Im Ji-eun as Choi Il-young (39)
- Kim Chae-yeon as Choi Yi-young (35)
- Lee Do-yeon as Noh Ji-hyun (9)

Lee Ye-rin's family

- Shim Hye-jin as Kim Joo-hee (54)
- Lee Jung-ho as Lee Min-gook (32)
- Oh Seung-eun as Oh Young-ah (30)

Han Jae-sung's family

- Jeon Moo-song as Han Ki-seok
- Kil Yong-woo as Han Yong-deok (57)
- Yang Geum-seok as Lee Mi-sook (54)
- Lee Se-chang as Lee Sung-soo (43)
- Ha Yeon-joo as Han Ki-eun

Extended cast

- Hong Jin-hee as Jang Mi-hwa (50)
- Lim Yoon-ho as Jang Dong-wook (25)
- Choi Su-rin as Sarah Kim
- Lee Jung-hoon as Seo Dong-won (40)
- Im Hyuk-pil as Kye Goo-man (40)
- Yoon Chae-yi as Han Seol-hee (33)
- Im Soo-hyun as Kim Na-ri (27)
- Son Woo-hyuk

== Awards and nominations ==
Year	Award	Category	Nominee	Result
2013	27th KBS Drama Awards	Excellence Award, Actress in a Daily Drama	Park Se-young	Nominated
2013	27th KBS Drama Awards	Best New Actress	Park Se-young	Nominated
