= Natalie Riess =

American artist, illustrator, and webcomic creator

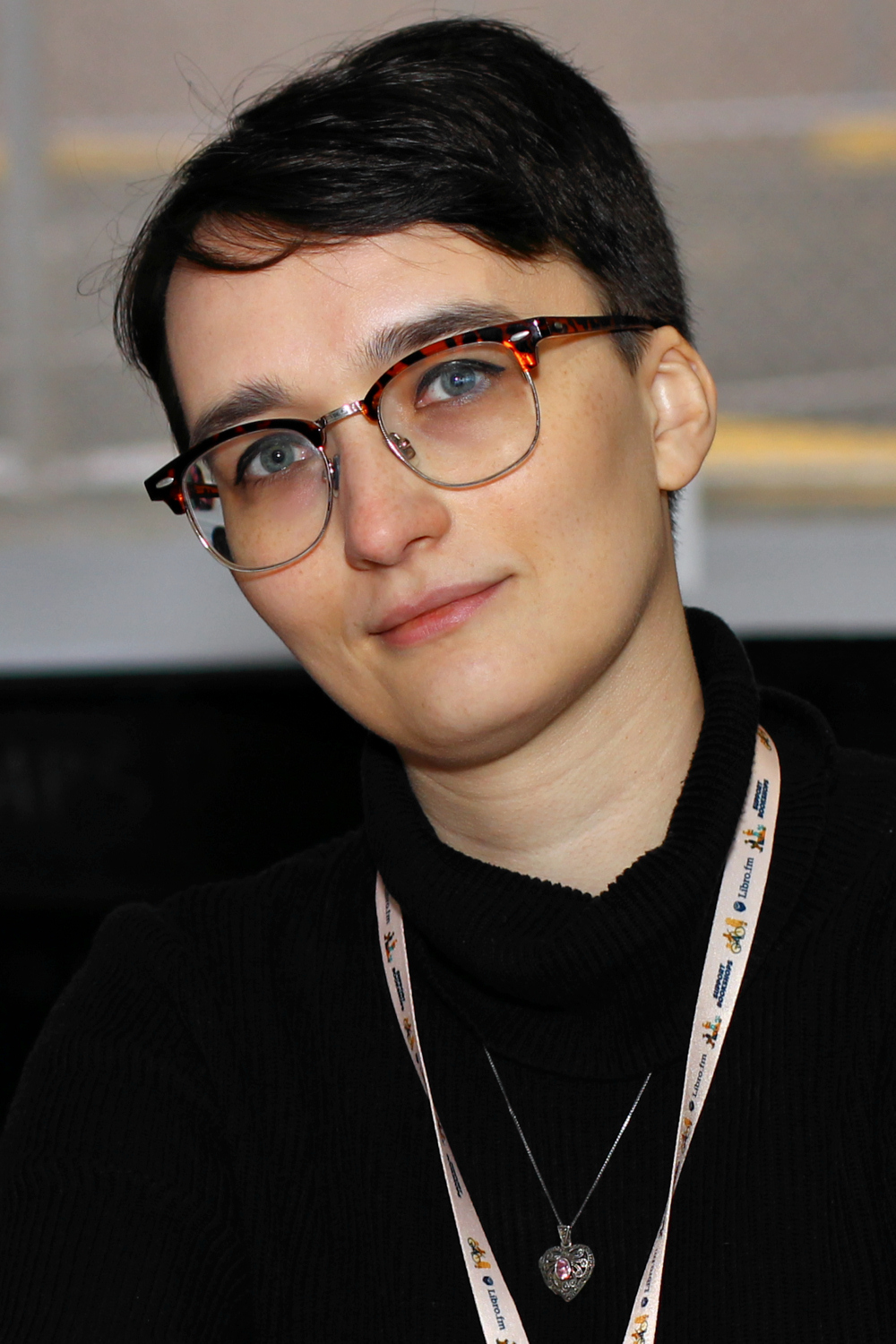
Riess at the 2023 Texas Book festival

Natalie Riess is an American artist, illustrator, and webcomic creator. She gained public recognition after her comic Space Battle Lunchtime was published by Oni Press in 2016. Her webcomic Dungeon Critters created with Sara Goetter was published by First Second Books in 2020.

== Personal life ==
Riess was born in New York and grew up in Pennsylvania. She earned a Bachelor of Fine Arts degree from Syracuse University's illustration program.

Her early comic inspirations were Jeff Smith's Bone and Bryan Lee O'Malley's Scott Pilgrim. Her favorite comic artists include E. M. Carroll, Gigi D. G., Kerascoët, Sam Bosma, and Juanjo Guarnido. She was also inspired by Studio Ghibli, especially for their depictions of cartoon fantasy food.

She currently resides in Austin, Texas.

== Works ==
Riess creates whimsical, colorful stories in digital media or watercolor. She created the webcomic Snarlbear in 2012 and it was originally intended to be a short project to improve her skills in art and story-creating. She got more serious about the project in 2015 after signing on with Hiveworks Comics.

She created Space Battle Lunchtime, which was an eight-issue miniseries that she wrote, illustrated, colored, and lettered all herself. Originally, she was going to pitch it to Hiveworks, however, it was too short. Instead, she submitted it to Oni Press in 2015 and it was Riess' first printed comic. It was published in May 2016.

In 2018, Riess created The Power Within, which is a customizable children's graphic novel that features different versions of three different heroes. Riess wrote and illustrated it, with coloring and painting assistance by Aliza Layne. It was released by Wonderbly in March 2018.

Riess started the comic Dungeon Critters as a collaborative project with Sara Goetter in the summer of 2016. It was published by First Second Books in 2020. Riess created the backgrounds and colors.

She illustrated the graphic novel adaptation of the first arc of Warriors with Sara Goetter.
