= Original programming =

First-run television programs produced by and for a network or streaming platform

Original programming (also called originals or original programs, and subcategorized as "original series", "original movies", "original documentaries" and "original specials") is a term used for in-house broadcast, cable, and streaming television series, telemovie, and feature film productions to which the exclusive domestic and — if the originating service operates non-domestic versions of the service outside of their home country — international broadcast rights are held by traditional and over-the-top content providers. The term was coined by HBO in 1983 when the premium service began producing its slate of in-house series and film productions. HBO initially branded the original series on the network under "HBOriginal" until 1986, and by 1993, the "originals" term had expanded to encompass most of its original productions. The term eventually expanded into use by various cable-originated television networks (including, among others, Disney Channel, TNT and USA Network) to identify their in-house productions. It also advertises them as being distinct from the acquired content offered to fill out the remainder of their programming schedule.

Most original made-for-cable or made-for-streaming productions are produced solely in conjunction with independent production companies that also hold day-to-day management responsibilities for the program, although some series (such as The Larry Sanders Show, Queer as Folk, The Leftovers and Power) share financial interests with major television studios—such as 20th Television, Warner Bros. Television and Lionsgate Television—that may also handle distribution responsibilities for domestic and international syndication on behalf of the originating network. Television networks and digital content providers that produce original programming include Cinemax, Netflix, Showtime, Amazon Prime, and YouTube. In October 2020, CBS became the first American broadcast network to identify all of its entertainment programming under the term, branding them as "CBS Originals"; however, the network uses the "original" term for both series produced by sister production company CBS Studios and series produced by third-party production companies. (ABC had previously marketed the 2016 miniseries Madoff and the 2019 made-for-TV movie Same Time, Next Christmas as "ABC Originals".)

== See also ==
- Broadcast syndication § First-run syndication
- Streaming media
- Video on demand
