= Ability (manhwa) =

South Korean webtoon by Son Je-ho and Lee Kwang-soo

- Cover of Ability volume 1

어빌리티 RR: Eobilliti MR: Ŏbillit'i
- Genre: Fantasy, action, supernatural fiction
- Author: Son Je-ho
- Illustrator: Lee Kwang-soo
- Publisher: Naver WEBTOON
- Magazine: Naver WEBTOON
- Original run: 2012
- Collected volumes: 1

Ability (Korean: 어빌리티) is a South Korean webtoon written by Son Je-ho and illustrated by Lee Kwang-soo. Started in 2012, the webtoon manhwa was released on Naver WEBTOON and is said to have taken a break after season one which lasted 60 chapters, but from several sources it is said the author has dropped the webtoon because he was sick. The author and artist of Ability also created the manhwa Noblesse. Despite being sick, he did announce he would keep continuing Noblesse. Ability therefore not get a season two until further notice from the author who had initially claimed to work on it after Noblesse ends.

== Plot ==
Under the backdrop of a city with a mysterious killer on the loose, story introduces to an exceptional young cafe owner, who possess the ability of rapid healing along with heightened physical abilities. The story begins with his encounter with a strange-looking little girl who asks to borrow his phone. He gladly obliges but, as he is appreciating the evening breeze, the girl's hat is blown off and she chases it out into traffic. He dives in front of the child to protect her and is hit by a truck. Some distance away a jewel cracks and a shadowy figure celebrates finding something.

== Characters ==
=== Han Yu-Hwa ===
Han Yu-Hwa is the main protagonist of the series. After saving Su-Jin Ji from a truck accident and an Another, he is drawn into the world of the supernatural. Yu-Hwa has average looks. His blonde hair is tied back in a ponytail. He wears metal earrings on both ears. Irrationally selfless, he throws himself into life or death situations with almost no regard for his own well-being, doing what he can to assist someone. Back when he was a kid, his contemporaries threw him out, once they noticed his unusual ability. He has stayed away from any sort of company since then.

=== Sa-Ryun ===
Sa-Ryu is the primary antagonist in the series. He saves Han Yu-Hwa from an Another, and helps him develop his abilities. Han Yu-Hwa believes this as an act of selflessness, but in reality, Sa-Ryun is only helping him develop his abilities so that he can steal them later on. He was a former member of the organization of Atran which is supposed to be an ally of Hon. He was given the title 'Hunter' for being an extraordinary assassin of Atran and is somewhere on the top of the Most dangerous list. Yet he was deemed a traitor after killing the heir of Atran's ruler because he found out about the whereabouts of the Pandora's box and was about to report it to Atran. This would be bad for extremely powerful Anothers like Sa-Ryun, Mase and Jacra. Despite not being allies, they do not seem to be attacking each other because of this very same reason. Once Atran would get their hands on Pandora's box and open it, the Ruler of Atran would become the ruler of the world which would strip every high level Another of their title because their powers would be useless. Sa-Ryun has many abilities he uses and also some hidden ones we don't know about. His favorite technique is Sa-Ryun Spheres which are red spheres appearing mid air, attacking his enemy with beams of light.

=== Su-Jin Ji ===
Su-Jin Ji (also called as "The Young Lady") is the head of Hon. At the start of series, she is saved by Han Yu-Hwa. She looks like a child in her early tens. She has a short figure with long brown hairs, is very bright and intelligent for her age. In the begin of the manhwa you really would not take her for the type to lead a whole organization, but instead like a spoiled rich girl. Despite being just a kid, she is also the key to open the pandora's box which Atran found and therefore planned on attacking Hon so they could capture the Young Lady.

=== Mase ===
Mase is a mysterious character running the Hon. He acts as a protector to Su-Jin Ji, the head of Hon. He seems very strict and tries to keep a stable relationship between Hon and Atran. Yet he did not know about Atran's ulterior motive of attacking Hon if it weren't for Sa-Ryun taking away their focus and making Atran focus on him instead. Mase decided to use Han Yu-Hwa as bait to lure out Sa-Ryun before, because he found out they were connected after Yu-Hwa used Sa-ryuns spheres to defeat some Anothers who were about to kill Un. Mase was willing to give both Sa-Ryun and Han Yu-Hwa to Atran to avoid a conflict with Atran. After Sa-Ryun's fight with Lector (it is not sure if Mase was watching until the end to dive in and snatch away Lector's orb), he dove in to fight the heavily wounded Sa-Ryun and to capture him. Yet during this fight, Lectors orb got absorbed by Han Yu-Hwa, making both Mase and Sa-Ryun stop fighting. That is when Sa-Ryun explained why he was being chased by Atran being him having killed the heir of Atran's ruler. It was all to prevent them getting their hands on the Pandora's box, which Mase did not seem to know about. Until the end Mase is an overpowered character who seems to be able to hold his own, even with Atran's top Anothers.

=== Ye Rin ===
Ye Rin is high-ranking member of Hon and shows a small attraction towards Han Yu-Hwa. Has ability to see footprints left behind by spiritual energy and uses hand-to-hand combat. She is supposed to be on the Most Dangerous List, but was left out on purpose to be one of Hon's secret weapons. She is a halfling.

=== Un ===
Un is a high-ranking member of Hon and is seen protecting Han Yu-Hwa quite often along with Yu Rin. Un uses a pair of tonfa like weapons to channel his energy into to make more concentrated and deadly attacks.

=== Jacra ===
Head of the Salamander's, some aggressive-type group, still not connected to Atran. For him, the perfect world is where the strong consume the weak and that's how it should be. He seems intrigued by Han Yu-Hwa being able to withstand his attacks even though any other person or Another would have died right away. He joins Atran's attack on Hon because he was being paid, but when he heard about Atran's real motive of capturing Pandora's key, he has a change of heart and decides to give Han Yu-Hwa a fight with his disciple Tar, a highly dangerous Another, with the condition they'd leave if Han Yu-Hwa would defeat him. Jacra is said to be right next to Sa-Ryun on the most dangerous list, it is not known which one of them is superior in strength, yet both seem to respect and acknowledge each other's power.

== Organisations ==
=== Hon ===
Hon is an organisation headed by Su Jin to protect weaker Anothers. While providing a policy of non-harming weaker ones, Hon has plenty of enemies among other organisations. Authorities in the human world know about the existence of Hon.

=== Atran ===
Atran is an organisation that acts under a motto of strong rules over the weaker ones. Atran opposes Hon's work. Sa-Ryun previously worked as an assassin in Atran until he killed the Heir of the ruler and was deemed a traitor.

=== Salamander ===
Ruled by Jacra, this is some aggressive-type group, still not connected to Atran.
