= Our Twisted Hero =

1987 novel by Yi Munyol

- Hangul: 우리들의 일그러진 영웅
- Hanja: 우리들의 일그러진 英雄
- RR: Urideurui ilgeureojin yeongung
- MR: Uridŭrŭi ilgŭrŏjin yŏngung

Our Twisted Hero
- Author: Yi Munyol
- Original title: 우리들의 일그러진 영웅
- Language: Korean
- Genre: Novel
- Publisher: World Literature (세계의 문학); Mineumsa (민음사)
- Publication date: June 1987
- Publication place: South Korea
- Media type: Quarterly magazine

Our Twisted Hero (Korean: 우리들의 일그러진 영웅) is a South Korean novel written by Yi Munyol. It is a political allegory of Korea's transition from dictatorship to democracy, with themes of how totalitarianism can crush intellectual opposition, either by intimidation or assimilation.

It was first published by World Literature (세계의 문학) in June 1987. Yi Munyol was awarded the 1987 Yi Sang Literary Award for the novel.

This book was a big hit in South Korea and was later made into the 1992 film adaptation, Our Twisted Hero, directed by Park Jong-won. It was translated into English by Kevin O'Rourke and published by Minumsa Publishing in 1988 and Hyperion East in 2001.

== Characters ==
- Han Pyongtae - protagonist
- Om Sokdae - class monitor of the 5th grade
- 5th grade teacher
- 6th grade teacher
- 8th grade teacher
- Pyongtae's Wife

== Plot ==
This story is told by a man named Han Byeong-tae (or Pyŏngt'ae), recalling his memories when he was in 5th grade and part of 6th grade.

Due to Byeong-tae's father failing in business, they move to a low town and go to Y Elementary School. There, he meets Eom Seokdae (or Ŏm Sŏkdae), a president of the 5th grade and one who holds everything in his grade, more than his teacher. However, Eom Seokdae forces students with threats and violence to follow him. Byeong-tae fights Soekdae's reign and tries everything in his power to overthrow the bully. However, every single student in their class supports Soekdae. Therefore, everything goes wrong for him; his parents misunderstand him, his grades go down and his power ranking also goes down. Hence he loses, gives up, and gives up under Seokdae's power.

After, Seokdae treats him specially, granting him more power and allowing him to gain popularity. First, he restores Byeong-tae's fighting rank to even higher than before. Second, he makes everyone hang out with Byeong-tae so he is not alone. Byeong-tae also gets his grades back up. At this point, the narrator begins to have mixed feelings for Seokdae, ranging from gratitude to fear. "I was thankful to Seokdae. But when I think it back, those things were the things I had lost to Seokdae. He had just given it back."

But when Byeong-tae goes to 6th grade, Seokdae's power breaks, because the new teacher takes action against the strange distribution of power among the classmates. After Seokdae's cheating and bullying have been outed by the teacher, he leaves school and is never heard from again.

The story turns back to the present. Byeong-tae, now grown up, ends up seeing a familiar man getting dragged down by the police in a station. As the man turns his face, Byeong-tae recognizes the distinctive features as Seokdae. Seokdae seems unchanged, still controlling people or at least trying to.

== Analysis ==
Han Byeong-tae fights against Eom Seokdae until he is left with nothing. At this point he breaks and gives up his principles, in a scene reminiscent of a parallel one in Orwell's 1984, turning instead to fight to gain Eom's respect. He is rewarded for this turn by being made Eom's second-in-command, a privileged position. When the new teacher breaks Seokdae's power in the school, while all the other students turn on Seokdae, only Byeong-tae refuses to admit to Seokdae's wrongdoings. This is seemingly because he cannot give up the power that cost him all of his original beliefs of freedom.

Seokdae's orderly rule is an allegory of Korea under its corrupt dictatorial regimes of the 1950s to 1980s, where freedom and human rights were sacrificed for social stability and economic growth. In the novel, under Sokdae's discipline, his class is one of the best-performing at the school and therefore earn many perks, and Sokdae also defends the students under his control from external threats. The new order that ousts Seokdae is an unromanticised representation of early democracy in Korea, which were idealistic and unsuccessful compared to the dictatorships. Yi asserts that, though the people should contest corrupt leadership and the appearance of order and success, good political intentions are not enough on their own.

== See also ==
- Korean literature
