= Choi Min-sik =

South Korean actor (born 1962)

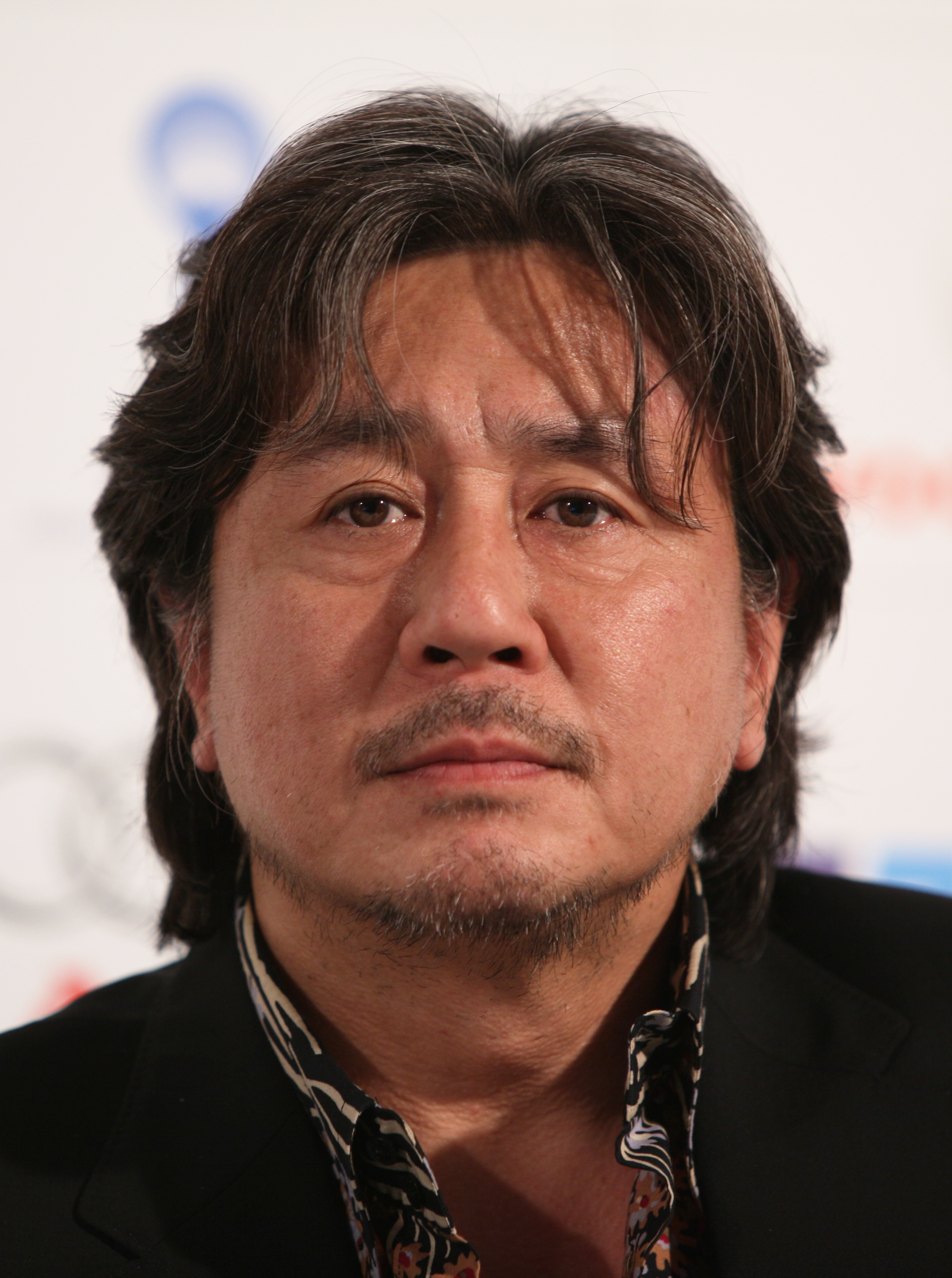
- Choi in 2009
- Born: May 30, 1962 (age 64); Ihwa-dong, Seoul, South Korea
- Occupation: Actor
- Years active: 1982–present
- Spouses: Lee Hwa-young (m. 1990; div. 1993) Kim Hwal-ran (m. 1999)
- Awards: Okgwan Order of Cultural Merit (2004)

Korean name
- Hangul: 최민식
- Hanja: 崔岷植
- RR: Choe Minsik
- MR: Ch'oe Minsik

Choi Min-sik (Korean: 최민식; born May 30, 1962) is a South Korean actor. Known for his intense and transformative performances, he first gained recognition with the television series The Moon of Seoul (1994). His film breakthrough came with Shiri (1999), which established Choi as a leading actor. However, it was his role in Oldboy (2003) that cemented his status as one of South Korea's greatest actors. His performance was critically acclaimed and won him Best Actor at the Baeksang Arts Awards, the Blue Dragon Film Awards, and the Grand Bell Awards.

Choi continued to star in high-profile films such as Lady Vengeance (2005), I Saw the Devil (2010), Nameless Gangster: Rules of the Time (2012), New World (2013), and The Admiral: Roaring Currents (2014), which became the highest-grossing film in South Korea. For his performance in the latter, Choi won the Grand Prize at the 51st Baeksang Arts Awards.

In 2014, Choi came to prominence in Hollywood with his role in Lucy (2014). He was also listed as Gallup Korea's Film Actor of the Year. Following this, he remained active in Korean cinema with works such as Forbidden Dream (2019) and Exhuma (2024). Choi also made his return to television with Big Bet (2022), his first drama series in over two decades.

== Early life ==
Choi was born on May 30, 1962, in Ihwa-dong, Jongno District, Seoul, South Korea. In the third grade of elementary school, he was diagnosed with tuberculosis and told that he could not be cured. However, he claims to have regained his health after spending a month at a Buddhist temple in the mountains.

While attending his third year of Daeil High School in Seoul, Choi began acting as a research student at a theater company. The young Choi was deeply moved by Ha Gil-jong's films and initially aspired to become a director. After graduating from high school, Choi enrolled in the Department of Theatre and Film at Dongguk University in 1982. He eventually changed his career path to become an actor while studying under Professor Ahn Min-soo, whom he had long admired.

== Career ==
=== 1982–1993: Early career ===
Choi began his professional career as a theatre actor by joining a theater company named 'Ppuri' (극단 뿌리) in 1982. His debut was a play named Our Town. Choi was so engrossed in theater that he spent nearly every day in the small theater. In 1984, he was offered the role of Alan in Equus, but was forced to hand it over to the actor Choi Jae-seong because Choi was drafted for mandatory military enlistment.

Choi and Han Suk-kyu were classmates at Dongguk University's Department of Theater and Film. During their time in school, they had the opportunity to perform together in plays like Ecstasy and For My Son. In 1988, while Choi was in his fourth year at the university, his college senior Park Jae-ho invited him to audition for Park Jong-won's early film Kuro Arirang. The film, released in 1989, was an adaptation of Lee Mun-yeol's 1987 novel of the same name, portraying the harsh working conditions of female workers in the sewing factory at the Kuro Industrial Complex. During that same year, Choi acted alongside Son Chang-min, who portrayed law student Hyung-bin, in director Jang Gil-soo's youth melodrama All That Falls Has Wings. In the film, Choi played the role of Hyung-bin's friend, an art student, and he eagerly put a lot of thought to his character's costumes.

After six years, in 1990, Choi was back onstage with the role of Alan in the Korean adaptation of Peter Shaffer's Equus. With this play, Choi Min-sik's name began to be known in Daehak-ro. Writer Na Yeon-suk saw his play, fell in love with Choi, and insisted on giving him a role in her next drama The Years of Ambition. The role of Lee Hwi-hyang's son, who is called 'Ku-chong' in the drama, was originally set to be played by Yoon Da-hoon. The Years of Ambition was a KBS hit weekend drama with an average viewer rating of close to 40%, and it aired for one year starting in October 1990. Choi, who practiced method acting in his portrayal of a tough rebellious child with a human side, 'Ku-chong', enjoyed popularity for the first time in his life. He quickly vaulted from a career as an unknown actor who was lucky to receive 500,000 won a month for a play to a talent who received 7 million won per advertisement.

Aside from his role as Teacher Kim in Park Jong-won's second film Our Twisted Hero (1992), in which he received the Best Actor Award at the 38th Asia-Pacific Film Festival, his activities in films were not particularly successful. The French location shoot film "Our Love as It Was" (1991) was a dark chapter he wanted to forget, and although he had a special appearance, the film "Sara Is Guilty" (1993), where his face prominently appeared on the poster, only taught him the lesson of not choosing projects lightly. After appearing in director Yoo Hyun-mok's "Mom, the Star, and the Sea Anemone" (1995), he spent four years away from films.

Although busy acting onstage as well as on the small and big screens, Choi was able to finish his studies at Dongguk University and graduated with a bachelor's degree in Theater and Film.

=== 1994–2002: Breakthrough ===
In 1994, Choi starred alongside Han Suk-kyu in MBC television dramas titled The Moon of Seoul. The plot revolves around the lives and hardships of commoners in Seoul. Choi portrayed Chun-seop, a single man who moves from the countryside to Seoul with dreams of success. He falls in love at first sight with Chae Shi-ra, his fellow tenant in a boarding house. However, he ultimately ends up marrying Ho-soon (Kim Won-hee), who is also from the countryside. This drama achieved remarkable success with a viewership rating of 48.7% (according to MSK survey), earning it the title of a masterpiece drama. The immense popularity of the show propelled Choi Min-shik and Han Suk-kyu to become top stars.

In 1996, while filming the MBC drama Their Embrace, Choi suffered an achilles tendon injury. Due to the lasting effects of this injury, he took a break from acting for some time.

In 1997, Choi returned to the stage after a seven-year hiatus in Jang Jin's play Taxi Driver. In this play, Choi portrayed a taxi driver, Jang Deok-bae, with Uhm Jung-hwa and several theater actors, including Woo Hyeon-joo, Kwon Seong-deok, Lee Yong-yi, Im Won-hee, Shin Ha-kyun, Jung Jae-young, and Yu In-chon, portraying his passengers. The play was produced by the theater troupe Yu Inchon Repertory Company and was staged at the Small Theater of Daehangno Culture and Arts Center in Seoul from February 28 to March 18. Choi stated his reason to comeback to theater as follows.

"When I was young, I made many mistakes and got caught up in worldly desires. I would commute to the broadcasting station every day, checking only if I had scenes to film and living my life like clockwork. Even if I had just one line of dialogue or stood like a screen, I would still receive my appearance fee for that day. I lived like that for 7-8 years until I felt a sense of desperation, thinking, 'I can't let myself continue to deteriorate like this.' That's why I appeared in Jang Jin's play 'Taxi Driver' with the mindset of grasping at straws."

In the same year, He also took part in the SBS sitcom Miss & Mister, which was directed by Ju Byeong-dae, a renowned director considered a pioneer of Korean sitcoms. In this sitcom, Choi portrayed a CF director, while Lee Jin-woo played the role of an assistant director.

It was his junior, Han Suk-kyu, who played a pivotal role in bringing Choi back to the film industry after his time away from the film scene. Han Suk-kyu called Choi and asked if he would be interested in doing another movie. Choi Min-shik replied, "Of course, why wouldn't I? Are you the only one doing it?" Encouraged by this call, Choi Min-shik joined Han Suk-kyu to act in director Song Song Neung-han's No. 3 (1997) and made a fiery return to the screen, portraying Ma Dong-pal, a hot-tempered prosecutor.

Additionally, Choi acted in the MBC morning drama Love and Separation, consisting of 122 episodes that aired from August 4, 1997, to January 3, 1998. In this drama, Choi played the lead character Kim Chan-ki, a divorced man who lives with his son and encounters a female kindergarten teacher. In between doing the drama, In October, Choi reprised his role as taxi driver, Jang Deok-bae in the 21st Seoul Theater Festival and received individual awards as the South Korean representative actor.

I had been involved in a TV drama for eight years. However, in 1996, after being greatly inspired by the play 'Taxi Driver,' I found myself in a state of deep contemplation. Having devoted my twenties to stage acting, I began questioning the true essence of my work. While the broadcasting fees had certainly fattened my bank account and provided a comfortable life, I couldn't help but feel that I hadn't truly grown or learned through this experience.

In 1998, Choi was honored with the DongA Theater Award for his performance in Taxi Driver. Subsequently, he accepted a role in Kim Jee-woon's debut film The Quiet Family. It was during this time that he made the decision to give up his television activities and focus solely on films. This was a decision he had been contemplating since his time in the theater production of Taxi Driver.

"In the beginning, I was involved in theater, and then I went through a divorce [in 1993]. When doing regular theater, we would spend around seven hours practicing the script, discussing, and analyzing it. However, when it comes to broadcasting, there is no such thing as rehearsal. After nine years of script acting, I couldn't bear it anymore. It wasn't a situation where I could analyze or do anything structurally. I felt like it wasn't right. If I had a family back then, I wouldn't have quit. But since I was alone, I thought about the essence, wondering if I couldn't endure it and if I had lost sight of why I started theater and what kind of actor I wanted to become. During a time when I was reflecting on my personal life after going through a divorce, [Han] Suk-kyu happened to suggest doing [film] No. 3. So, I made a bold decision to quit."

Choi's first major success came with his role as a North Korean agent in the 1999 film Shiri. Not only was the film critically acclaimed, but it also achieved significant box office success. Choi's portrayal earned him the Best Actor award at the Grand Bell Awards. In the same year, he also participated in the production of Hamlet 1999 by Theater Troupe You. The play premiered on April 20 as the inaugural production of 'You Theater,' a small theater dedicated to performances in Cheongdam-dong, Gangnam District, Seoul. It ran until June 20.

Following that, Choi starred in Happy End, where he depicted a man who is betrayed by his wife. In 2001, he took on the role of a gangster opposite Cecilia Cheung in Failan.

A year later, Choi portrayed Jang Seung-eop, a Joseon-era painter, in Im Kwon-taek's Chihwaseon, which was awarded the Best Director prize at the Cannes Film Festival.

=== 2003–2005: Oldboy and international recognition ===
In 2003, Choi starred in Park Chan-wook's Oldboy. Choi's exceptional and composed performance in the film propelled his fame in Korea to great heights and introduced him to international audiences.

In the next two years, he played a trumpet player in Springtime, a struggling former boxer in Ryoo Seung-wan's Crying Fist, and a child murderer in Sympathy for Lady Vengeance, the last film in Park Chan-wook's vengeance trilogy.

In Springtime, Choi takes on a role Hyon-woo, a dissatisfied classically trained trumpet player, who fails to achieve his desired career path and settles for part-time teaching at an academy. His personal life is fraught with arguments with his mother and unresolved feelings for his ex-girlfriend. Seeking change, he accepts a job as a band teacher in a small town, where the music program's success is crucial for its survival. Despite challenges, Hyon-woo embraces his new role, connecting with the locals, including pharmacist Soo-yon and troubled student Jae-il. This role demands a greater sense of tranquility and gentleness compared to his typical emotionally intense characters.

In 2005, Choi and Song Kang-ho were accused by director and Cinema Service head Kang Woo-suk of demanding a share of profits for so-called "contributions" when no contributions were made. Kang later rescinded the statement and apologized.

=== 2006–2009: Hiatus and activism ===
At various points during 2006, Choi and other South Korean film industry professionals, together and separate from Choi, demonstrated in Seoul and at the Cannes Film Festival against the South Korean administration's decision to reduce the Screen Quotas from 146 to 73 days as part of the Free Trade Agreement with the United States. As a sign of protest, Choi returned the prestigious Okgwan Order of Cultural Merit which had been awarded to him, saying, "To halve the screen quota is tantamount to a death sentence for Korean film. This medal, once a symbol of pride, is now nothing more than a sign of disgrace, and it is with a heavy heart that I must return it."

Over the next four years, Choi went on a self-imposed exile from making films, begun in protest over the screen quota but also partly due to the studios' reluctance to hire the outspoken and politically active actor. Instead he returned to his theater roots in 2007. He also starred in the 2003 London production of Martin McDonagh's The Pillowman, his first play in seven years.

During the retrospective on Choi held at the 14th Lyon Asian Film Festival in November 2008, the actor was asked his reaction to the upcoming remake of Oldboy, and he admitted to the French reporters present that he was upset at Hollywood for using what he described as pressure tactics on Asian and European filmmakers so they could remake foreign movies in the United States.

Choi made his comeback in Jeon Soo-il's 2009 art film Himalaya, Where the Wind Dwells, in which he was the only South Korean actor working with locally cast Tibetan actors.

=== 2010–2021: Resurgence and international work ===
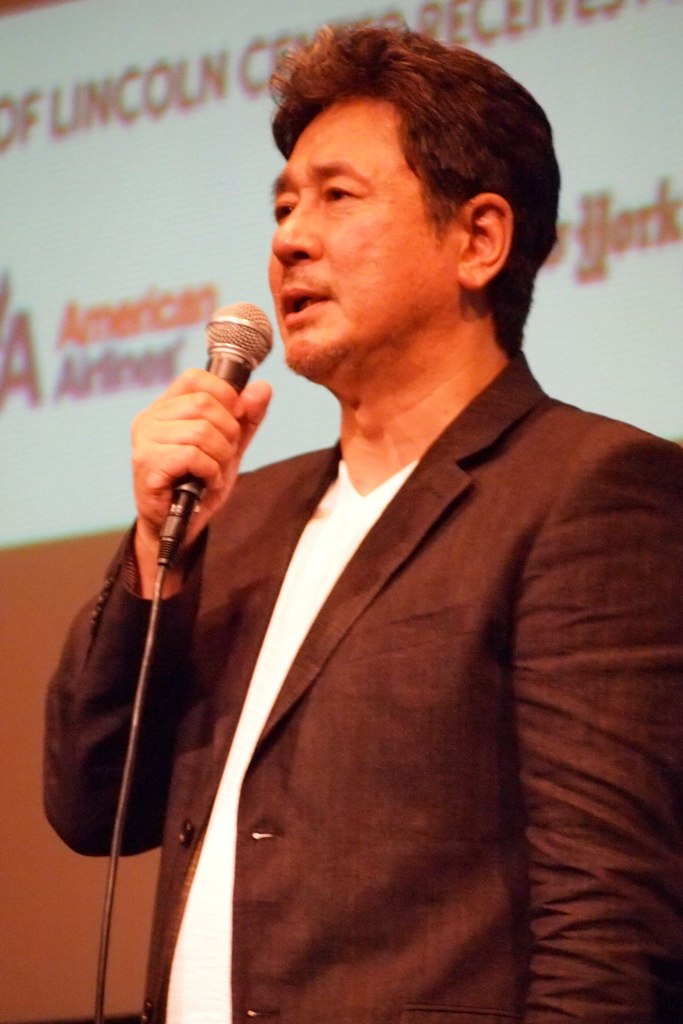
Choi attending an event for Nameless Gangster: Rules of the Time at the New York Asian Film Festival, on June 30, 2012

Though Kim Jee-woon's 2010 action thriller I Saw the Devil drew criticism from some quarters for its ultra-violent content, reviewers agreed that Choi's performance as a serial killer was memorable and the film emerged as a box office success. Choi did voice acting for Leafie, A Hen into the Wild, which in 2011 became the highest grossing South Korean animated film in history.

In his 2012 follow-up Nameless Gangster: Rules of the Time, Choi played another complex, layered antihero, and the Yoon Jong-bin film was both a critical and box office hit and earned him the Best Performance by an Actor award at the 2012 Asia Pacific Screen Awards. The film gave rise to numerous unforgettable moments and quotable lines, becoming a frequent target for parody in popular television variety shows like Gag Concert and Infinite Challenge. Comedians would imitate the hairstyles, fashion, and even the catchthe phrase sara itne (Korean: 살아 있네, loosely translated as 'feeling alive') uttered by Choi Min-sik's character Choi Ik-yun. The song "I Heard a Rumor" also became popular.

Choi's next film was Park Hoon-jung's New World, a 2013 noir about an undercover cop in the world of gangsters, which also became successful critically and commercially.

For his English-language debut, Choi appeared in Luc Besson's Lucy (2014), in the role of Mr. Jang, a Korean drug lord who kidnaps a girl and forces her to become a drug mule, but she inadvertently acquires superhuman powers. In order to secure Choi's involvement, Besson and his team traveled to Korea to meet with the actor, discuss the story, and it was only towards the end of their conversation that Choi expressed his interest in joining the project. Director Luc Besson praised Choi's performance, stating that he was the "best villain" Besson had scripted since Gary Oldman's character Norman Stansfield. Besson described Mr. Jang as the embodiment of ultimate evil, contrasting Lucy, the film's protagonist, who represents ultimate intelligence.

He then played Yi Sun-sin in the blockbuster period epic The Admiral: Roaring Currents about the Battle of Myeongnyang, regarded as one of the admiral's most remarkable naval victories. Roaring Currents became the all-time most watched film in South Korean film history, the first ever to reach 15 million admissions and the first local film to gross more than US$100 million.

Choi next starred in the period film The Tiger: An Old Hunter's Tale, where he played a hunter.

Choi had two films in 2017; he played an unscrupulous mayor in the political film The Mayor, and headlined the remake crime thriller Heart Blackened.

In 2019, Choi and Han Suk-kyu joined forces once again in Hur Jin-ho's period film Forbidden Dream. Written by Jung Bum-shik and Lee Ji-min, the movie is a true story adaptation that explores the dynamic between Sejong the Great (Han Suk-kyu), king of the Joseon dynasty of Korea, and his relationship with his greatest scientist, Jang Yeong-sil (Choi Min-sik).

On December 10, 2021, Choi contract with C-JeS Entertainment ended. He decided to stay as free agent afterward.

=== 2022–present: Return to small screen and continued success ===
In 2022, Choi starred in the Disney+ series Big Bet, marking his first drama series appearance in 26 years since Love and Separation in 1997. Seventy percent of the filming was conducted in the Philippines. Choi earned nominations for best actor in 59th Baeksang Arts Awards and 2nd Blue Dragon Series Award for his role as Cha Mu-sik.

In 2023, the 27th Bucheon International Fantastic Film Festival organized a special actor exhibition titled 'I Saw Choi Min-sik'. The exhibition showcased the acting career of Choi Min-sik spanning over 30 years. Ten feature films personally selected by Choi Min-sik were screened, including films Our Twisted Hero, Shiri, Happy End, Failan, Oldboy, Springtime, I Saw the Devil, Nameless Gangster: Rules of the Time, Forbidden Dream, and In Our Prime. In addition, two of his short films, Steam and Winter Road, were digitally restored and released in collaboration with the Korean Film Archive as part of the exhibition.

== Personal life ==
Choi Min-shik married actress Lee Hwa-young in 1990. Lee was also studying the same major at Chung-Ang University. They met while collaborating on a play. However, their marriage ended in 1993.

In 1999, Choi married for the second time, this time with Kim Hwal-ran. Choi was introduced to Kim by his alum at Dongguk University and Jeon Young-min, the representative of his agency. It was through their connections that brought Choi and Kim together.

== Filmography ==
=== Film ===
Key
†	Denotes films that have not yet been released

Year	Title	Role	Notes	Ref.
1989	Kuro Arirang	Jin-seok		
1990	That Which Falls Has Wings	Tae-sik		
1992	Our Twisted Hero	Kim Jung-won		
1992	May Our Love Stay This Way	Joon-hyuk		
1993	Sara is Guilty	Music teacher		
1995	Mom, the Star, and the Sea Anemone	Mam-bo	Cameo	
1997	No. 3	Ma Dong-pal		
1998	The Quiet Family	Kang Chang-gu		
1999	Shiri	Park Mu-young		
1999	Happy End	Seo Min-ki		
2001	Failan	Lee Kang-jae		
2002	Chi-hwa-seon	Jang Seung-eop		
2003	Oldboy	Oh Dae-su		
2004	Taegukgi	North Korean commander	Cameo	
2004	Springtime	Hyun-woo		
2005	Crying Fist	Kang Tae-sik		
2005	Lady Vengeance	Baek Han-sang		
2009	Himalaya, Where the Wind Dwells	Choi		
2010	I Saw the Devil	Jang Kyung-chul		
2011	Leafie, A Hen into the Wild	Drifter	Voice	
2012	Nameless Gangster: Rules of the Time	Choi Ik-hyun		
2013	New World	Kang Hyung-chul		
2013	In My End Is My Beginning	Doctor	Voice cameo	
2014	Lucy	Mr. Jang	English-language debut	
2014	The Admiral: Roaring Currents	Yi Sun-sin		
2015	The Tiger	Chun Man-duk		
2017	The Mayor	Byeon Jong-gu		
2017	Heart Blackened	Im Tae-san		
2019	The Battle: Roar to Victory	Hong Beom-do	Cameo	
2019	Forbidden Dream	Jang Yeong-sil		
2021	Heaven: To the Land of Happiness	203		
2022	In Our Prime	Lee Hak-seong		
2024	Exhuma	Kim Sang-deok		
2026	The Intern	Kim Ki-ho		

=== Television ===
Key
†	Denotes television productions that have not yet been released

Year	Title	Role	Notes	Ref.
1990	Years of Ambition	Kuchon		
1990	500 Years of Joseon	Park Seung-hwan		
1992	The Beloved	Lee Dong-wook		
1992	Sons and Daughters	—N/a		
1994	The Moon of Seoul	Park Chun-seob		
1995	Till We Meet Again	Han Suk-jin		
1995	The Fourth Republic	Kim Dae-joong		
1995	MBC Best Theatre - If you love			
1996	Their Embrace	Ahn Dong-chul		
1996	Dad is the Boss	—N/a		
1997	Miss and Mister	—N/a		
1997	Love and Separation	Kim Chan-gi		
2022–2023	Big Bet	Cha Mu-sik	Season 1–2	
2026	Notes from the Last Row	Heo Mun-oh		

=== Documentary ===
Year	Title	Role
2011	Ari Ari the Korean Cinema	Himself
2016	Old Days	Himself

=== Music video appearances ===
Year	Title	Artist(s)	Ref.
2023	"Stranger"	Zion.T	

== Theater ==
Year	Title		Role	Theater	Date	Ref.
Year	English	Korean	Role	Theater	Date	Ref.
1982	Our Town	우리 읍내	—N/a	Theater Ppuri	—N/a	
1989	Real Name - Insult	실비명 - 모욕	Jung-woo	Culture and Art Hall Small Theater	September 23 to October 5	
1989	(7th) Gyeongsangnam-do Theater Festival: Blood in the Basin	(제7회) 경상남도연극제 : 분지의 피	Chief	Gyeongsangnam-do Theater	April 18	
1990	Equus	에쿠우스	Alan Strang	Exclusive Theater for Experimental Theater	September 20 to October 21	
1997	Taxi Driver - Where are you going?	택시 드리벌 - 당신은 어디까지 가십니까?	Taxi driver Jang Deok-bae	Arts and Culture Center Small Theater	February 27–March 18	
1997	(21st) Seoul Theater Festival: Taxi Driver - Where are you going?	(제21회) 서울연극제: 택시 드리벌 - 당신은 어디까지 가십니까?	Taxi driver Jang Deok-bae	Arts and Culture Center Small Theater	October 10–15	
1999	Hamlet 1999	햄릿 1999	Laertes	U Theater	April 20 to June 20	
1999	Gyeongbuk Pohang Jecheol Seo Elementary School 'Cat in a Mousetrap' - The 8th National Children's Play Contest	경북 포항제철 서초등학교 '쥐덫에 걸린 고양이' - 제8회 전국어린이 연극경연대회	The Rats	Dongsoong Art Center Dongsoong Hall	November 6	
2000	Leave When They're Applauding	박수칠 때 떠나라	Choi Yeon-ki (detective)	LG Arts Center	June 16–30	
2007	The Pillowman	필로우맨	K. Katurian	LG Arts Center	May 1–20	

== Accolades ==
=== Awards and nominations ===
Year	Award	Category	Nominated work	Result	Ref.
1990	KBS Drama Awards	Best New Actor	Years of Ambition	Won	
1991	27th Baeksang Arts Awards	Best New Actor – Television	Years of Ambition	Nominated	
1992	13th Blue Dragon Film Awards	Best Supporting Actor	Our Twisted Hero	Nominated	
1993	31st Grand Bell Awards	Best Supporting Actor	Our Twisted Hero	Nominated	
1993	38th Asia Pacific Film Festival	Best Supporting Actor	Our Twisted Hero	Won	
1994	MBC Drama Awards	Top Excellence Award, Actor	The Moon of Seoul	Nominated	
1997	21st Seoul Theater Festival	Best Actor	Taxi Driver	Won	
1997	34th DongA Theater Award	Best Actor	Taxi Driver	Won	
1997	35th Grand Bell Awards	Best Supporting Actor	No. 3	Nominated	
1999	22nd Golden Cinematography Awards	Most Popular Actor	Shiri	Won	
1999	35th Baeksang Arts Awards	Best Actor – Film	Shiri	Won	
1999	36th Grand Bell Awards	Best Actor	Shiri	Won	
1999	20th Blue Dragon Film Awards	Best Actor	Shiri	Nominated	
1999	2nd Director's Cut Awards	Best Actor	Shiri, Happy End	Won	
2000	45th Asia Pacific Film Festival	Best Actor	Happy End	Won	
2000	36th Baeksang Arts Awards	Best Actor – Film	Happy End	Nominated	
2001	2nd Busan Film Critics Awards	Best Actor	Failan	Won	
2001	22nd Blue Dragon Film Awards	Best Actor	Failan	Won	
2001	21st Korean Association of Film Critics Awards	Best Actor	Failan	Won	
2001	4th Director's Cut Awards	Best Actor	Failan	Won	
2002	38th Baeksang Arts Awards	Best Actor – Film	Failan	Nominated	
2002	39th Grand Bell Awards	Best Actor	Failan	Nominated	
2002	4th Deauville Asian Film Festival	Best Actor	Failan	Won	
2002	23rd Blue Dragon Film Awards	Best Actor	Chi-hwa-seon	Nominated	
2003	24th Blue Dragon Film Awards	Best Actor	Oldboy	Won	
2004	40th Baeksang Arts Awards	Best Actor – Film	Oldboy	Won	
2004	41st Grand Bell Awards	Best Actor	Oldboy	Won	
2004	12th Chunsa Film Art Awards	Best Actor	Oldboy	Won	
2004	24th Korean Association of Film Critics Awards	Best Actor	Oldboy	Won	
2004	1st Max Movie Awards	Best Actor	Oldboy	Won	
2004	49th Asia Pacific Film Festival	Best Actor	Oldboy	Won	
2004	7th Director's Cut Awards	Best Actor	Oldboy	Won	
2004	1st University Film Festival of Korea	Best Actor	Oldboy	Won	
2004	3rd Korean Film Awards	Best Actor	Oldboy	Won	
2004	3rd Korean Film Awards	Best Actor	Springtime	Nominated	
2004	25th Blue Dragon Film Awards	Best Actor	Springtime	Nominated	
2005	9th Fantasia Festival	Best Actor	Crying Fist	Won	
2005	5th Korea World Youth Film Festival	Favorite Actor	Crying Fist	Won	
2010	13th Director's Cut Awards	Best Actor	I Saw the Devil	Won	
2010	47th Grand Bell Awards	Best Actor	I Saw the Devil	Nominated	
2010	8th Korean Film Awards	Best Actor	I Saw the Devil	Nominated	
2011	Scream Awards	Best Villain	I Saw the Devil	Nominated	
2012	Fangoria Chainsaw Awards	Best Actor	I Saw the Devil	Nominated	
2012	48th Baeksang Arts Awards	Best Actor – Film	Nameless Gangster: Rules of the Time	Nominated	
2012	21st Buil Film Awards	Best Actor	Nameless Gangster: Rules of the Time	Won	
2012	6th Asia Pacific Screen Awards	Best Actor	Nameless Gangster: Rules of the Time	Won	
2012	49th Grand Bell Awards	Best Actor	Nameless Gangster: Rules of the Time	Nominated	
2012	33rd Blue Dragon Film Awards	Best Actor	Nameless Gangster: Rules of the Time	Won	
2013	4th KOFRA Film Awards	Best Actor	Nameless Gangster: Rules of the Time	Won	
2013	7th Asian Film Awards	Best Actor	Nameless Gangster: Rules of the Time	Nominated	
2013	7th Asian Film Awards	Favorite Actor	Nameless Gangster: Rules of the Time	Nominated	
2014	13rd Firenze Korea Film Awards	Achievement Award	—N/a	Won	
2014	2nd Marie Claire Asia Star Awards	Actor of the Year	The Admiral: Roaring Currents	Won	
2014	23rd Buil Film Awards	Best Actor	The Admiral: Roaring Currents	Nominated	
2014	34th Korean Association of Film Critics Awards	Best Actor	The Admiral: Roaring Currents	Won	
2014	51st Grand Bell Awards	Best Actor	The Admiral: Roaring Currents	Won	
2014	4th SACF Artists of the Year Awards	Grand Prize (Daesang) (Note: A Daesang (Korean: 대상), which translates to "Grand Prize", is the highest honor given out at South Korean award ceremonies.)	The Admiral: Roaring Currents	Won	
2014	35th Blue Dragon Film Awards	Best Actor	The Admiral: Roaring Currents	Nominated	
2014	3rd Korea Film Actors Association Awards	Top Star Award	The Admiral: Roaring Currents	Won	
2015	6th KOFRA Film Awards	Best Actor	The Admiral: Roaring Currents	Won	
2015	10th Max Movie Awards	Best Actor	The Admiral: Roaring Currents	Won	
2015	20th Chunsa Film Art Awards	Best Actor	The Admiral: Roaring Currents	Nominated	
2015	9th Asian Film Awards	Best Actor	The Admiral: Roaring Currents	Nominated	
2015	51st Baeksang Arts Awards	Best Actor – Film	The Admiral: Roaring Currents	Nominated	
2015	51st Baeksang Arts Awards	Grand Prize (Daesang) – Film	The Admiral: Roaring Currents	Won	
2016	21st Chunsa Film Art Awards	Best Actor	The Tiger: An Old Hunter's Tale	Nominated	
2016	53rd Grand Bell Awards	Best Actor	The Tiger: An Old Hunter's Tale	Nominated	
2017	6th Korea Film Actors Association Awards	Top Star Award	Heart Blackened	Won	
2022	58th Baeksang Arts Awards	Best Actor – Film	In Our Prime	Nominated	
2023	21st Director's Cut Awards	Best Actor in the Series	Big Bet	Nominated	
2023	59th Baeksang Arts Awards	Best Actor – Television	Big Bet	Nominated	
2023	2nd Blue Dragon Series Awards	Best Actor	Big Bet	Nominated	
2023	18th Seoul International Drama Awards	Golden Bird Prize (Individual)	Big Bet	Won	
2023	59th Grand Bell Awards	Best Actor in a Series	Big Bet	Won	
2023	1st Fundex Awards	Top Excellence Award for OTT Series	Big Bet	Won	
2024	22nd Director's Cut Awards	Best Actor in the Series	Big Bet 2	Nominated	
2024	60th Baeksang Arts Awards	Best Actor – Film	Exhuma	Nominated	
2024	45th Blue Dragon Film Awards	Best Actor	Exhuma	Nominated	
2024	25th Busan Film Critics Awards	Best Actor	Exhuma	Won	
2025	18th Asian Film Awards	Best Actor	Exhuma	Nominated	
2025	23rd Director's Cut Awards	Best Actor in Film	Exhuma	Nominated	

=== State honors ===
Name of country, year given, and name of honor
Country/Organization	Year	Honor	Ref.
South Korea	2004	Okgwan (Jeweled Crown), 4th Class	

=== Listicles ===
Name of publisher, year listed, name of listicle, and placement
Publisher	Year	Listicle	Placement	Ref.
Cine21	2003–2004	50 in Powerful People in Film Industry	11th	
Cine21	2005	50 in Powerful People in Film Industry	16th	
Dong-A Ilbo	2001	Dong-A Ilbo's Actor of the Year	1st	
Dong-A Ilbo	2002	Dong-A Ilbo's Actor of the Year	2nd	
Dong-A Ilbo	2003	Dong-A Ilbo's Actor of the Year	3rd	
Dong-A Ilbo	2004	Dong-A Ilbo's Actor of the Year	1st	
Dong-A Ilbo	2004	Most Influential Actor	2nd	
Gallup Korea	2004	Film Actor of the Year	4th	
Gallup Korea	2014	Film Actor of the Year	1st	
Gallup Korea	2023	Film Actor of the Year	11th	
Herald Economy	2014	Pop Culture Power Leader Big 30	7th	
Herald Economy	2015	Pop Culture Power Leader Big 30	24th (Note: Tied with Lee Woo-jung)	
Korean Film Council	2021	Korean Actors 200 (Note: Introduces 200 actors that best represent the present and future of Korean cinema to the people in the film industry all over the world.)	Included	
Max Movie	2004	Preferred Actor by Scriptwriter	1st	
Premiere (Note: Premier, a monthly film magazine, conducted a survey of 148 film experts and workers, including directors, producers, staff, critics, and reporters)	2003	Actor of the Year	2nd	
Premiere	2004	Actor of the Year	1st	
Sisa Journal (Note: Sisa Journal is one of the major weekly news magazines in Korea. Established in 1989, its annually conducted 'Who Moves Korea' survey determines the most influential figures in the country and highlights next-generation leaders of Korea. The survey is conducted on a total of 1000 experts across 10 fields, including professors, journalists, politicians, businessmen, and cultural artists.)	2005	Actor with the Best Acting Skills	1st	
Sisa Journal	2010	Next Generation Leader — Film Industry	4th	
Sisa Journal	2014	Next Generation Leader — Film Industry	9th (Note: Tied with Ha Jung-woo)	
The Screen	2009	1984–2008 Top Box Office Powerhouse Actors in Korean Movies	6th	
The Screen	2019	2009–2019 Top Box Office Powerhouse Actors in Korean Movies	14th	
The Village Voice Annual Film Critics Poll	2005	Best Performance	40th	
