= No. 3 =

1997 South Korean comedy film

- Theatrical release poster
- Hangul: 넘버3
- RR: Neombeo3
- MR: Nŏmbŏ3
- Directed by: Song Neung-han
- Written by: Song Neung-han
- Starring: Han Suk-kyu; Choi Min-sik; Lee Mi-yeon
- Cinematography: Park Seung-bae
- Edited by: Park Gok-ji; Nam Na-yeong
- Music by: Cho Dong-ik
- Production company: Free Cinema
- Distributed by: Cinema Service
- Release date: July 10, 1997
- Running time: 108 minutes
- Country: South Korea
- Language: Korean

No. 3 (Korean: 넘버3) is a 1997 South Korean crime comedy film starring Han Suk-kyu as the titular no. 3 man of a gang who aspires to rise up the ranks and become the leader of his own gang. It was writer-director Song Neung-han's feature directorial debut.

== Plot ==
Tae-ju is a low-level gangster in the Do-gang faction. After successfully helping his boss escape during an internal coup, he rises to become the third-in-command. He becomes rivals with Jae-cheol, who wields an ashtray as a weapon and is vying for the top position. Five years later, Tae-ju is assigned to oversee the acquisition of the Peace Hotel, the gang's most critical mission. However, his plans are thwarted by a notorious prosecutor named Ma Dong-pal, known as a figurative nuclear bomb in the legal world. Tae-ju attempts to bribe Dong-pal, but fails. Meanwhile, Tae-ju's wife Hyun-ji, a former hostess, dreams of becoming a poet. She engages in an unexpected affair with a third-rate poet named Rimbaud. Though she finds sexual fulfillment with him, she eventually hands him over to Ji-na, the madam of a nightclub and the boss's wife.

Elsewhere, Jo-pil, who had previously failed in an assassination attempt on the Do-gang boss five years earlier, trains rigorously with his three loyal subordinates deep in the mountains. Together, they form the Bul-sa-pa gang, seeking vengeance. Tae-ju, who has spent fifteen years as a thug with nothing but a knife, begins to solidify his determination to become the number one in the organization. He studies foreign languages to adapt to the increasingly globalized underworld, but his efforts yield little success. Jae-cheol, the simple-minded number two, continues to solve all his problems with brute force and his ashtray. Living in the same apartment complex as Tae-ju, Dong-pal constantly picks fights with him, causing endless irritation. Hyun-ji grows dissatisfied with her husband's dangerous lifestyle. She discovers a fraudulent publishing company that promises to debut her as a poet if she buys 500 copies of her own book, leading her to pursue her literary dreams.

Dong-pal holds a unique belief: "The person who commits a crime is bad; the crime itself is innocent". Feared by gangsters for his brutal approach to justice, he often resorts to physical violence. Known for his foul-mouthed outbursts, his favorite pastime is provoking Tae-ju whenever they cross paths in their apartment building. Amidst this chaotic web of characters, including Jae-cheol, who mistakes the internet for an international police agency, and the boss who preaches about creating a globalized gang for the 21st century, the underworld becomes a stage for betrayal, deception, and power struggles.

== Cast ==
- Han Suk-kyu as Seo Tae-ju
- Choi Min-sik as Ma Dong-pal
- Lee Mi-yeon as Kim Hyun-ji
- Park Kwang-jung as Rimbaud
- Park Sang-myun as Park Jae-cheol
- Song Kang-ho as Jo-pil
- Bang Eun-hee as Ji-na

== Themes ==
In Korean Film: History, Resistance, and Democratic Imagination, Min Eung-jun et al. state that through his portrayal of gangster society in this film, Song allegorically criticizes all of contemporary South Korean society. Calling the film a "black comedy employing satire and self-reflexivity", Min says the film represents a revisionist impulse in contemporary Korean cinema for several reasons. It uses violence allegorically not as an expression of repressed sexuality, but as an expression of the absurdity of Korean society. Also, rather than focus exclusively on male aspirations, it simultaneously shows the desires of its female characters as well. Furthermore, in satirizing Korean society, it does not exclude the bourgeoisie from its critical eye.

Rather than employ the straightforward narrative techniques and "ruthless logic" of the traditional gangster film such as director Im Kwon-taek's General's Son trilogy, No. 3 uses a purposely artificial and stylized technique to satirize both the gangster genre and society at large. Like Green Fish, released the same year, and other "new" gangster films, No. 3 refuses to deal with a story built around the traditional Korean concept of han, a concept which Min calls "endurance and acceptance of painful life within the community". No. 3 replaces han with "new values" such as materialism and individualism, which are then held up for ridicule.

Min singles out the last segment of the film, "Chaos", for analysis, calling it one of the major achievements of the new Korean cinema. In this part of the film, the Korean gang boss has invited his Japanese gangster associates for a meeting in a room salon. While the meeting is in progress, the wife of the Korean boss is having sex with her poetry tutor in another room. An argument over the ownership of the Liancourt Islands breaks out between the lower strata of Japanese and Korean gangsters just as a rival gang breaks in to assassinate the Korean boss. Police then show up to arrest the entire group. Min says that this kaleidoscopic portrayal of the chaos of contemporary society "portrays in a tongue-in-cheek manner the anarchic blending of gangland with business, loyalty... with infidelity, sex with poetry, and violence with nationalism".

== See also ==
- Cinema of South Korea
- Kkangpae
