= Our Twisted Hero (film) =

- Theatrical poster for Our Twisted Hero (1992)
- Hangul: 우리들의 일그러진 영웅
- Hanja: 우리들의 일그러진 英雄
- RR: Urideurui ilgeureojin yeongung
- MR: Uridŭrŭi ilgŭrŏjin yŏngung
- Directed by: Park Jong-won
- Screenplay by: Park Jong-won; Jang Hyun-soo
- Based on: Our Twisted Hero by Yi Munyol
- Produced by: Do Dong-hwan
- Starring: Hong Kyung-in
- Cinematography: Chung Kwang-suk
- Edited by: Ree Kyoung-ja
- Music by: Song Byeong-joon
- Distributed by: Dae Dong Enterprises Co., Ltd.
- Release date: August 15, 1992
- Running time: 119 minutes
- Country: South Korea
- Language: Korean

Our Twisted Hero (Korean: 우리들의 일그러진 영웅; RR: Urideurui ilgeureojin yeongung) is a 1992 South Korean drama film directed by Park Jong-won. It was chosen as Best Film at the Chunsa Film Art Awards. It is based on the short novel Our Twisted Hero by Yi Munyol.

== Synopsis ==
A man traveling to the funeral of his fifth-grade teacher recalls his life at the time. As a city boy transferred to a country school, he encountered an unexpectedly old-fashioned hierarchical bullying system. When he tried to create a rebellion against the system, both those oppressed by it and the teachers and parents opposed him. When change finally came to the school, it was in an equally harsh form.

== Cast ==
- Hong Kyung-in: Eom Seok-dae
- Go Jeong-il: Han Byeong-tae
- Choi Min-sik: Teacher Kim
- Shin Goo: Teacher Choi
- Shin Cheol-jin: Kim Young-pal
- Lee Jin-seon: Woman teacher
- U Sang-jeon: Byeong-tae's father
- Kim Hye-ok: Byeong-tae's mother
- Jeong Un-bong: Kyo-gam
- Park Kwang-jin: Old teacher

== Bibliography ==
=== English ===
- "OUR TWISTED HERO". [The Complete Index to World Film].
- Urideului ilgeuleojin yeongung (1992) at IMDb
- "Our Twisted Hero (Ulideul-ui ilgeuleojin yeong-ung) (1992)". Korean Movie Database (KMDb).

=== Korean ===
- 우리들의 일그러진 영웅. Cine21 (in Korean).
- 우리들의 일그러진 영웅 (1992). Korean Movie Database (in Korean).

=== Contemporary reviews ===
- "「우리들의 일그러진 영웅」/한국영화 첫 아랍수출" (1992-09-28). Kukmin Ilbo
