= Han Suk-kyu =

South Korean actor (born 1964)

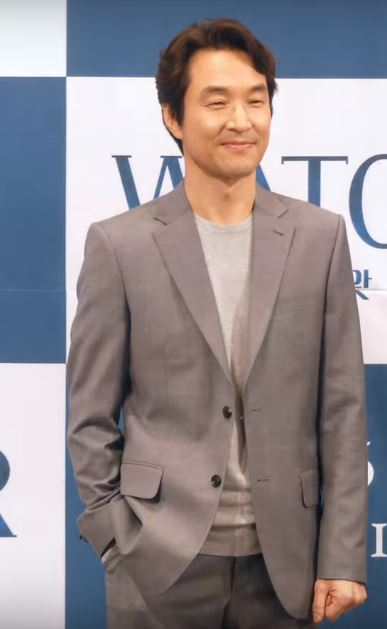
- Han in 2019
- Born: November 3, 1964 (age 62); Seoul, South Korea
- Education: Dongguk University - Theater and Film
- Occupation: Actor
- Years active: 1990–present
- Spouse: Im Myung-ju (m. 1998)
- Children: 4

Korean name
- Hangul: 한석규
- RR: Han Seokgyu
- MR: Han Sŏkkyu

Han Suk-kyu (Korean: 한석규; born November 3, 1964) is a South Korean actor. One of the leading actors of Korean cinema in the 1990s, he rose to prominence with a string of critically acclaimed films, including Green Fish (1997), No. 3 (1997), The Contact (1997), Christmas in August (1998), and the action thriller Shiri (1999), which was a major box office success and marked a turning point for the Korean film industry. Following this successful period, Han took a hiatus from acting due to a herniated disc.

Upon his return, Han re-established himself as a versatile actor with roles in both film and television. His notable later works include the historical drama Deep Rooted Tree (2011), the espionage thriller The Berlin File (2013), and the crime drama The Prison (2017). He is also well known for his portrayal of Teacher Kim in the popular medical drama Dr. Romantic (2016–2023). In addition, he appeared in the thriller series Watcher (2019) and the psychological drama Doubt (2024).

== Career ==
=== 1990–1994: Early work and breakthrough ===
While a student at the Theater and Film department of Dongguk University, he sang in an amateur folk rock band. He took a brief, year-long contract as voice actor at KBS, before moving on to TV and film acting.

After a debut in the 1990 MBC campus drama Our Paradise, Han rose to stardom as "Hong-shik" in The Moon of Seoul (1994), a charming gigolo from the slums determined to attain wealth at all cost in the big city. "Choon-seop", an old friend from hometown played by Choi Min-sik, struggles hopelessly to stop "Hong-shik" from his self-ruin. The partnership of Han and Choi as uneasy allies or foes, parlayed into two flagship films of the 1990s: No. 3 and Shiri. Both the series and "Hong-shik" character have since become beloved icons, as part of the Korean television's golden era before the advent of Korean Wave.

=== 1995–1999: Prominence ===
Before the end of the 20th century, Han headlined films that were critically acclaimed (Green Fish, No. 3) and commercially successful (The Contact, Christmas in August, Shiri — the latter two making particular impact in Japan).

Han's experience in the early stages of Korean cinema renaissance in the 1990s, cemented his belief in a script-driven model for movie-making. Thus the founding of "Makdong Script Festival" (named after his role in Green Fish), with co-sponsor film magazine Cine 21. Winners may claim two cash prizes funded by Han, with the potential to launch directing careers based from their own scripts. The annual contest is now extant over 10 years, with two titles produced so far: the comedy 2424 (2002) and Private Eye (2009) starring Hwang Jung-min.

=== 2000–2010: Hiatus and career fluctuations ===
Han went into an extended hiatus in 1999 declining several lucrative opportunities with name directors as he suffered disc problem.

Han returned in 2003 with espionage film Double Agent. The film, which netted one million admissions, was seen as a failure for a star labeled by the media as "box office guarantee." This was followed by a sizable backlash from netizens and the press, who rushed to bury the co-self-produced spy thriller as the public disgrace of a former golden boy.

His press and image took further beating in the next two, even more polarizing films: the unforeseen tragedy surrounding The Scarlet Letter, and the incendiary political content of The President's Last Bang. Nonetheless, these controversial works screened at Cannes, and were featured in a tribute to the actor at the Austrian FilmAsia festival.

Despite this rocky return to feature films, Han remains well regarded by such major directors as Park Chan-wook, Lee Joon-ik, Kang Woo-suk and Jang Jin. Compared to his peak popularity in the 90s, his work may seem an acquired taste for general audiences, although some cult following ensued for his ultra-sadistic turn in A Bloody Aria.

He remained self-managed until as late as 2006, before joining the KM Culture agency due to increased regimentation of the industry. Making 2006 a busy year, Han starred in period sex comedy Forbidden Quest, followed by black comedy film A Bloody Aria and melodrama film Solace. Stylish thrillers followed, where Han starred alongside Cha Seung-won in Eye for an Eye and Son Ye-jin in the adaptation of Keigo Higashino novel of White Night. Han then starred in Villain and Widow with Kim Hye-soo.

=== 2011–2015: Resurgence and return to small screen ===
Han returned to the spotlight with his performance in historical drama Deep Rooted Tree, where his performance of King Sejong earned him the Grand Award at the 2011 SBS Drama Awards.

In 2013, Han starred in the action thriller film The Berlin File, playing a South Korean agent. He then starred in musical film My Paparotti, playing a music teacher who is stuck in a rut until he meets a delinquent teenager.

He returned to the small screen in the historical drama Secret Door, playing King Yeongjo. This was followed by period film The Royal Tailor, about a rivalry between two tailors at the Sangŭiwŏn. However, both projects were less successful.

=== 2016–present: Established actor ===
Han bounced back with the hit medical drama Dr. Romantic, written by acclaimed screenwriter Kang Eun-kyung. The drama garnered over 20% viewership ratings, and Han received positive reviews for his performance. He also won the Grand Prize (Daesang) Award at the 2016 SBS Drama Awards.

Han returned to the big screen in crime drama film The Prison. Han is slated to star in upcoming thrillers Idol and Father's War, and period drama film Astronomy.

In 2019, Han starred in OCN's thriller drama Watcher as a detective.

In 2020, Han reprised his role of Teacher Kim in Dr. Romantic 2.

== Image and influence ==
Known for his distinctive voice and diction, Han has been a long-time mentor to Kam Woo-sung, including coaching the latter's enunciation for his film debut in Marriage is a Crazy Thing. Actors of the younger generation also continue to cite him as an influence; among them: Hwang Jung-min, Ryoo Seung-bum, Kim Myung-min, Kim Joo-hyuk of Blue Swallow, Kim Ji-soo of This Charming Girl, Tsuyoshi Kusanagi (who famously began a second career in Korea after seeing Han in Shiri), Rain, Lee Sung-jae of Barking Dogs Never Bite, Lee Jin-wook, and Im Ji-kyu. He also remains well respected among major peers for his distinctive style (a cerebral and intricate minimalism driven by semantics and implosive restraint): Kim Hye-soo, Song Kang-ho, Oh Dal-su (especially for their collaboration in Forbidden Quest and A Bloody Aria), Sul Kyung-gu, and Choi Min-sik.

For his part, Han has cited influences by Korean actor Kim Seung-ho, Al Pacino, Ken Takakura, The Godfather trilogy, and Hayao Miyazaki.

== Personal life ==
On November 22, 1998, Han married KBS 21st voice actor Im Myung-ju, whom he dated from the days of the KBS Voice Actor Association. The couple have two sons and two daughters.

== Filmography ==
=== Film ===
Year	Title	Role	Notes	Ref.
1995	Mom, the Star, and the Sea Anemone		Special appearance	
1995	Doctor Bong	Bong Joon-soo		
1996	The Ginkgo Bed	Soo-hyeon/Jong-moon		
1997	Green Fish	Kim Mak-dong		
1997	No. 3	Seo Tae-ju		
1997	The Contact	Kwon Dong-hyeon		
1998	Christmas in August	Jung-won		
1999	Shiri	Yoo Joong-won		
1999	Tell Me Something	Detective Jo		
2003	Double Agent	Rim Byeong-ho		
2004	The Scarlet Letter	Lee Ki-hoon		
2005	The President's Last Bang	KCIA Chief Agent Joo		
2005	Quiz King	Jo Jin-man		
2006	Forbidden Quest	Kim Yoon-seo		
2006	A Bloody Aria	Lee Moon-jae		
2006	Solace	Shim In-gu		
2008	Eye for an Eye	Baek Seong-chan		
2009	White Night	Han Dong-soo		
2010	Villain and Widow	Kang Chang-in		
2013	The Berlin File	Jeong Jin-soo		
2013	My Paparotti	Na Sang-jin		
2014	The Royal Tailor	Jo Dol-seok		
2017	The Prison	Jung Ik-ho		
2019	Idol	Goo Myeong-hoe		
2019	Forbidden Dream	King Sejong		

=== Television ===
Year	Title	Role	Notes	Ref.
1990	Our Paradise	Hyun Chul		
1991	Eyes of Dawn	Young Man from Seobuk		
1992–1993	Sons and Daughters	Han Suk-ho		
1993	Pilot	Park Sang-hyun		
1994	The Moon of Seoul	Kim Hong-shik		
1994	Challenge			
1994	Kareisky	Yoo Jae-sang		
1995	Hotel	Im Hyung-bin		
2011	Deep Rooted Tree	Lee Do / King Sejong		
2014	Secret Door	King Yeongjo		
2016–2023	Dr. Romantic	Teacher Kim / Boo Yong-joo	Season 1–3	
2019	Watcher	Do Chi-kwang		
2022	Recipe for Farewell	Kang Chang-wook		
2024	Doubt	Jang Tae-su		
2025	Shin's Project	Mr. Shin		
TBA	When the Day Breaks			

== Accolades ==
=== Awards and nominations ===
Name of the award ceremony, year presented, category, nominee of the award, and the result of the nomination
Award ceremony	Year	Category	Nominee / Work	Result	Ref.
APAN Star Awards	2012	Top Excellence Award, Actor	Deep Rooted Tree	Nominated	
APAN Star Awards	2023	Top Excellence Award, Actor in a Serial Drama	Dr. Romantic 3	Nominated	
Asian Film Critics Association Awards	1999	Best Actor	Christmas in August	Nominated	
Asian Film Critics Association Awards	2004	Best Actor	The Scarlet Letter	Nominated	
Baeksang Arts Awards	1994	Best New Actor – Television	Pilot	Nominated	
Baeksang Arts Awards	1995	Best Actor – Television	The Moon of Seoul	Nominated	
Baeksang Arts Awards	1996	Best New Actor – Film	The Ginkgo Bed	Won	
Baeksang Arts Awards	1996	Best Actor – Film	Doctor Bong	Nominated	
Baeksang Arts Awards	1997	Best Actor – Film	Green Fish	Won	
Baeksang Arts Awards	1998	Best Actor – Film	Christmas in August	Nominated	
Baeksang Arts Awards	1999	Best Actor – Film	Shiri	Nominated	
Baeksang Arts Awards	2005	Best Actor – Film	The President's Last Bang	Nominated	
Baeksang Arts Awards	2012	Best Actor – Television	Deep Rooted Tree	Nominated	
Baeksang Arts Awards	2017	Best Actor – Television	Dr. Romantic	Nominated	
Baeksang Arts Awards	2020	Best Actor – Film	Forbidden Dream	Nominated	
Baeksang Arts Awards	2025	Best Actor – Television	Doubt	Nominated	
Blue Dragon Film Awards	1995	Best Actor	Doctor Bong	Nominated	
Blue Dragon Film Awards	1996	Best Actor	The Ginkgo Bed	Nominated	
Blue Dragon Film Awards	1997	Popular Star Award	Green Fish / The Contact / No. 3	Won	
Blue Dragon Film Awards	1997	Best Actor	Green Fish	Won	
Blue Dragon Film Awards	1998	Popular Star Award	Christmas in August	Won	
Blue Dragon Film Awards	1998	Best Actor	Christmas in August	Nominated	
Blue Dragon Film Awards	1999	Popular Star Award	Shiri / Tell Me Something	Won	
Blue Dragon Film Awards	1999	Best Actor	Tell Me Something	Nominated	
Blue Dragon Film Awards	2004	Best Actor	The Scarlet Letter	Nominated	
Buil Film Awards	2008	Best Actor	Eye for an Eye	Nominated	
Buil Film Awards	2019	Best Actor	Idol	Nominated	
Buil Film Awards	2020	Best Actor	Forbidden Dream	Nominated	
Chunsa Film Art Awards	1995	Best New Actor	Doctor Bong	Won	
Chunsa Film Art Awards	2020	Best Actor	Forbidden Dream	Nominated	
Cine21 Film Awards	1996	Best New Actor	Doctor Bong	Won	
Cine21 Film Awards	1998	Best Actor	Christmas in August	Won	
Cine21 Film Awards	2024	Actor of the Year (Series)	Doubt	Won	
Director's Cut Awards	1998	Best Actor	Christmas in August	Won	
Director's Cut Awards	2019	Best Actor	Idol	Nominated	
Director's Cut Awards	2023	Best Actor in Television	Recipe for Farewell	Nominated	
Fantasia International Film Festival	2019	Best Actor	Idol	Won	
Golden Cinematography Awards	1997	Most Popular Actor	Green Fish	Won	
Grand Bell Awards	1996	Best New Actor	Doctor Bong	Nominated	
Grand Bell Awards	1996	Best Actor	The Ginkgo Bed	Nominated	
Grand Bell Awards	1997	Popularity Award	Green Fish / The Contact / No. 3	Won	
Grand Bell Awards	1997	Best Actor	Green Fish	Won	
Grand Bell Awards	1999	Popularity Award	Christmas in August / Shiri	Won	
Grand Bell Awards	1999	Best Actor	Christmas in August	Nominated	
Grand Bell Awards	2000	Popularity Award	Tell Me Something	Won	
Grand Bell Awards	2017	Best Actor	The Prison	Nominated	
Grand Bell Awards	2020	Best Actor	Forbidden Dream	Nominated	
Grimae Awards	2024	Best Actor	Doubt	Won	
Italia Global Series Festival	2025	Best Actor	Doubt	Won	
Korea Drama Awards	2012	Grand Prize (Daesang)	Deep Rooted Tree	Nominated	
Korea Drama Awards	2017	Grand Prize (Daesang)	Dr. Romantic	Nominated	
Korea Drama Awards	2023	Grand Prize (Daesang)	Dr. Romantic 3	Nominated	
Korean Association of Film Critics Awards	1997	Best Actor	Green Fish	Won	
Korean Culture and Entertainment Awards	1999	Best Actor	Shiri / Tell Me Something	Won	
Korean Film Awards	2006	Best Actor	Forbidden Quest	Nominated	
Korea Broadcasting Association Awards	1994	Best Actor	The Moon of Seoul	Nominated	
MBC Drama Awards	1993	Best New Actor	Pilot, Sons and Daughters	Won	
MBC Drama Awards	1994	Top Excellence Award, Actor	The Moon of Seoul	Won	
MBC Drama Awards	2024	Grand Prize (Daesang)	Doubt	Won	
MBC Drama Awards	2024	Top Excellence Award, Actor in a Miniseries	Doubt	Nominated	
MBC Gangbyeon Song Festival	1984	Encouragement Award	Han Suk-kyu	Won	
SBS Drama Awards	2011	Grand Prize (Daesang)	Deep Rooted Tree	Won	
SBS Drama Awards	2011	Top 10 Stars	Deep Rooted Tree	Won	
SBS Drama Awards	2011	Top Excellence Award, Actor in a Drama Special	Deep Rooted Tree	Nominated	
SBS Drama Awards	2014	Grand Prize (Daesang)	Secret Door	Nominated	
SBS Drama Awards	2014	Top Excellence Award, Actor in a Serial Drama	Secret Door	Nominated	
SBS Drama Awards	2016	Grand Prize (Daesang)	Dr. Romantic	Won	
SBS Drama Awards	2016	Top 10 Stars	Dr. Romantic	Won	
SBS Drama Awards	2016	Top Excellence Award, Actor in a Genre & Fantasy Drama	Dr. Romantic	Nominated	
SBS Drama Awards	2020	Grand Prize (Daesang)	Dr. Romantic 2	Nominated	
SBS Drama Awards	2020	Top Excellence Award, Actor in a Miniseries Genre/Action Drama	Dr. Romantic 2	Nominated	
SBS Drama Awards	2023	Grand Prize (Daesang)	Dr. Romantic 3	Nominated	
SBS Drama Awards	2023	Top Excellence Award, Actor in a Seasonal Drama	Dr. Romantic 3	Nominated	
TV Journal Star of the Year	1994	Excellence Award	The Moon of Seoul	Won	
Women Viewers Film Awards	1998	Best Actor	Christmas in August	Won	

=== State honors ===
Name of country, year given, and name of honor
Country or organization	Year	Honor	Ref.
South Korea (Note: Honors are given at the Korean Popular Culture and Arts Awards, arranged by the Korea Creative Content Agency and hosted by the Ministry of Culture, Sports and Tourism. They are awarded to those who have contributed to the arts and South Korea's pop culture.)	2012	Presidential Commendation	

=== Listicles ===
Name of publisher, year listed, name of listicle, and placement
Publisher	Year	Listicle	Placement	Ref.
Gallup Korea	2004	Gallup Korea's Film Actor of the Year	5th	
Gallup Korea	2011	Gallup Korea's Film Actor of the Year	10th	
Gallup Korea	2013	Gallup Korea's Film Actor of the Year	17th	
Gallup Korea	2023	Gallup Korea's Television Actor of the Year	8th (Note: Tied with Kim Hae-sook and Kim Hye-soo with 2.4% point)	
The Screen	2009	1984–2008 Top Box Office Powerhouse Actors in Korean Movies	3rd	
