= Tell Me Something (film) =

- Theatrical release poster
- Hangul: 텔 미 썸딩
- RR: Tel mi sseomding
- MR: T'el mi ssŏmding
- Directed by: Chang Yoon-hyun
- Written by: Kong Su-chang; In Eun-ah; Shim Hye-won; Kim Eun-jeong; Chang Yoon-hyun
- Produced by: Koo Bon-han; Chang Yoon-hyun
- Starring: Han Suk-kyu; Shim Eun-ha
- Cinematography: Kim Sung-bok
- Edited by: Kim Sang-bum
- Music by: Jo Yeong-wook; Bang Jun-seok
- Release date: November 13, 1999 (South Korea)
- Running time: 116 minutes
- Country: South Korea
- Language: Korean

Tell Me Something (Korean: 텔 미 썸딩) is a 1999 South Korean crime thriller film directed by Chang Yoon-hyun. It was an early South Korean film to find success abroad as part of the Korean Wave, and was selected to appear in the 2001 New York Korean Film Festival.

== Plot ==
The story begins with Detective Jo returning to work after the death of his mother. He is accused of accepting money from a dubious source to pay for his mother's medical treatment. He denies the accusation but becomes disgraced nevertheless and it is left ambiguous whether he is really innocent of this charge.

Detective Jo is put on the case of a serial killer who amputates the limbs and heads of his victims and mixes body parts – swapping a new part into the body of each new victim. The trail of victims leads to a beautiful young woman, Chae Soo-yeon, the daughter of a famous painter, as it becomes apparent that she knew each of the victims and had dated them in the past. Soo-yeon's past is gradually revealed as she becomes close to Jo. Her only close friend, Seung-min, a doctor she has known since high school, reveals that Soo-yeon had tried to kill herself several times in the past. This apparent fragility is picked up by a painting in her country retreat, which depicts her as Ophelia drowning (a recreation of the Pre-Raphaelite painting of the same name by Millais, seen earlier in the film). The body count mounts and Soo-yeon moves into Jo's apartment for safety.

Suspicion moves to Soo-yeon's absent father as it emerges that her father had abused her over a long period of time. It is suggested that Jo will be the next victim due to his growing closeness to Soo-yeon. Jo's colleague, Detective Oh, finds the apartment where the killings have taken place but is murdered. However, he manages to procure a photograph that provides a crucial clue for Jo. A showdown occurs, in which both Soo-yeon and Jo survive. Soo-yeon bids a warm farewell to Jo, thanking him, and sets off for Paris.

Jo realizes that Soo-yeon is in fact the killer, and has sewn together limbs from each body into one which Jo finds suspended in a tall aquarium in her living room. He breaks the glass, causing the water to knock him down. He is shown on his back, wet in a recreation of the Ophelia pose. Soo-yeon's plane takes off to Paris, and she tells the man sitting next to her that it is her first time to Paris despite having stated earlier that she had studied there.

== Cast ==
- Han Suk-kyu as Detective Jo / Jo Min-seok
- Shim Eun-ha as Chae Soo-yeon
- Ahn Suk-hwan as Coroner Gu
- Jang Hang-sun as Detective Oh
- Yum Jung-ah as Oh Seung-min
- Yoo Jun-sang as Kim Ki-yeon

== Critical reception ==
In his essay "Horror as Critique in Tell Me Something and Sympathy for Mr. Vengeance," Kyu Hyun Kim writes that Tell Me Something plays with the idea of scopophilia in order to comment on both male gaze and the horror genre. He cites Laura Mulvey as asserting of the horror genre that "the female body tends to be objectified by the male viewer... resulting in 'fetishistic scopophilia', the pleasure derived from looking at the female body, idealized as a beautiful and perfect object, and sadistic voyeurism, which stems from the fear of castration" (Kim, 107). Soo-yeon's father derives fetishistic pleasure from making the young Soo-yeon stand for painting and photographing her. Her college acquaintance and stalker also photographs her to build a shrine, and Detective Jo repeatedly gazes at her via surveillance camera. The painting that scared Su-Yeon as a child and appears over the opening credits is a recreation of The Anatomy Lesson of Dr. Nicolaes Tulp by Rembrandt, which in turn references De humani corporis fabrica, recalling the anatomy theater of the Renaissance. Kim writes that Tell Me Something directly engages the idea of scopophilia to purposefully draw attention to horror spectatorship and play with the voyeuristic nature of the viewer.
