= Ku Sang =

South Korean poet (1919–2004)

- Born: September 16, 1919; Ihwa-dong, Keijō, Korea, Empire of Japan
- Died: May 11, 2004 (aged 84)
- Occupation: Poet

- Korean name
- Hangul: 구상
- Hanja: 具常
- RR: Gu Sang
- MR: Ku Sang

Ku Sang (Korean: 구상; September 16, 1919 – May 11, 2004) was a Korean poet, considered one of Korea's most respected and trusted poets.

== Life ==
Ku Sang was born in Keijō (Seoul), Keiki Province, Korea, Empire of Japan. He was raised in Wonsan, Kankyōnan Province (now in North Korea). His parents were Catholic and his older brother was a priest, but after studying in Japan he had a crisis of faith and only returned to Catholicism later in life. Ku returned to the area of his up-bringing, working as a journalist and writer. His efforts to publish his poetry just after the end of the Second World War were met with resistance from the Communist authorities and he fled to the south. Ku served as assistant director of the writers' group that was deployed to cover the activities of the South Korean military during the Korean War. He also served as editor-in-chief of The Yeongnam Ilbo, editorial writer for the Kyunghyang Shinmun, and as a lecturer on poetry at Chung-Ang University. He was a member of the Korean Academy of Arts. Ku Sang died on May 11, 2005.

Ku suffered from tuberculosis.

== Work ==
Ku Sang began writing poetry as a university student. His first poetic publications were in a volume put out by the Wonsan Writers League. These poems were severely criticized by the Communist party in the north, and he fled south.

He also wrote essays on literature, social issues and religion. Later in life, he edited anthologies of literature. A number of his poetic works trace his life in Korea's history. Many of these poems are collected in Even the Knots on Quince Trees.

Scholars have remarked on the directness and lack of linguistic play in his poetry (e.g., "Ku Sang's poetic language is extremely clear for he uses very direct and candid expressions",). According to Brother Anthony, an authority on Korean poetry, his "poetry is marked by a rejection of the refined symbolism and artificial rhetoric found in the often more highly esteemed work of poets such as So Chong-ju. Instead, Ku Sang ...[often] begins his poems with the evocation of a personal moment of perception, in the midst of the city or of nature, and moves from there to considerations of more general import, where the poem frequently turns into a meditation on the presence of Eternity in the midst of time". Some of the themes of his poetry include pollution of the environment, health, and spirituality.

Ku Sang also wrote plays.

The poetry of Ku Sang is a potent commentary of the injustice, inequity, and absurdity of modern society. His work is concurrently grounded in his Christian faith, which offers the poet a perennial source of personal repentance. Thus Ku's work is immersed in the poet's search for a poetic aesthetic that arises from a solid ontological foundation. Ku rejects both an artistic sensibility that lacks spiritual depth and a crude intellect that lacks a historical consciousness. Thus the poet's stance manifests itself vividly in his collection of poetry entitled Wasteland Poems (Chotoui Si).

These poems draw upon Ku's own experience of the Korean War, and describe the process of surmounting the suffering engendered by war and of achieving salvation. Though Ku grounds his poetic undertakings in his firm Christian faith, he also embraces a wide variety of other spiritual and religious influences. His poems also allude to the legends of the founding of Korean people, Korean traditional culture, the elite culture of Chinese letters, the workings of nature, the tradition of contemplation in Seon (Chan in Chinese) Buddhism, and Taoist thought. Ku seamlessly fuses these diverse strands of thought with the Christian belief of salvation. Thus, in his constant examination of both Korean tradition and religious faith, Ku's poetry probes the depths of human existence with a constant awareness of the meaning of history. At the same time, his poetry attempts to capture the realm of absolute faith.

== Works in Korean (partial) ==
Collections of Poems

- Poems of Ku Sang (Ku Sang Sijip)
- Wasteland Poems (Chotoui Si)
- Even the knots on Quince Trees (Mogwa ongdurieseo sayeoni)
- On Dreyfus' Bench (Deurepwiseuui benchieseo)
- A Cycle of Poems by Ku Sang (Ku Sang Yeonjak Sijip)

== Works in Translation ==
English

- WASTELANDS OF FIRE: Poems by Ku Sang, translated by Brother Anthony. Forest Books: London. 1989 (ISBN 0-948259-82-5)
- Infant Splendor: Poems and Paintings, translated by Brother Anthony. Samseong: Seoul. 1990
- River and Fields: A Korean Century, translated by Brother Anthony. Forest Books: London, 1991

German

- Auf der Bank von Dreyfus (Deurepwiseu-ui benchi-eseo)

Swedish

- Det eviga livet: dikter (Gusangsiseon <Yeongwonhi>)

Italian

- Il fiume di Cristoforo (Gusangsiseon)

French

- Terre Brûlée (Choto-ui si)
- DOUZE POÈTES CORÉENS CONTEMPORAINS (Hanguk hyeondaesi)

== Secondary literature ==
- Brother Anthony, "From Korean History to Korean Poetry: Ko UN and Ku Sang," World Literature Today, Vol. 71, 1997,
- Chung, Kum-chul, "The Poetic Representation of Anxiety and Warlike Experiences in Koo Sang's Early Poetry," publication of The Society for Korean Language & Literary Research, No. 129 / Vol. 34, no. 1 (March, 2006), pp. 151–172.

== See also ==
- Korean Literature
- List of Korean-language poets
