= Shiri (film) =

- Theatrical release poster
- Hangul: 쉬리
- RR: Swiri
- MR: Shwiri
- Directed by: Kang Je-gyu
- Written by: Kang Je-gyu
- Produced by: Byeon Moo-rim; Lee Kwan-hak
- Starring: Han Suk-kyu; Choi Min-sik; Song Kang-ho; Yunjin Kim
- Cinematography: Kim Seong-bok
- Edited by: Park Gok-ji
- Music by: Lee Dong-joon
- Production companies: Frontier Works Comic; Kang Je-Kyu Film Co. Ltd.; Samsung Entertainment
- Distributed by: Samsung Entertainment
- Release date: February 13, 1999
- Running time: 125 minutes
- Country: South Korea
- Language: Korean
- Budget: $8.5 million (est.)

Shiri (Korean: 쉬리; RR: Swiri) is a 1999 South Korean action spy film, written and directed by Kang Je-gyu. It was the first Hollywood-style big-budget blockbuster to be produced in the new Korean film industry (i.e. after Korea's major economic boom in the late 1990s). Created as a deliberate homage to the "high-octane" action film made popular by Hollywood through the 1980s, it also contained a story that draws on strong Korean national sentiment to fuel its drama. Much of the film's visual style is shared with that of Asian action cinema, particularly Hong Kong action cinema such as John Woo, Tsui Hark, Ringo Lam, and the relentless pace of the second unit directors, like Vic Armstrong and Guy Hamilton, in the James Bond films.

The film was released under the name Shiri outside of South Korea; in South Korea the title was spelled Swiri. The name refers to Coreoleuciscus splendidus, a fish found in Korean fresh-water streams. At one point in the film antagonist Park Mu-young has a monologue wherein he describes how the waters from both North and South Korea flow freely together, and how the fish can be found in either water without knowing to which it belongs. This ties into the film's ambitions to be the first major-release film to directly address the still-thorny issue of Korean reunification.

== Plot ==
In September 1992, an elite group of North Korean soldiers are put through a brutal training regime. Under the auspices of their commander, Park Mu-young, they will be sent into South Korea as sleeper agents, to be reactivated at some later date. The most promising of the group is Lee Bang-hee, a female sniper who assassinates several key South Korean figures over the next six years.

Over six years later, in September 1998, South Korea is searching for Bang-hee. OP Center, a South Korean intelligence agency, is tasked with hunting her down. The agent in charge of her case, Yu Jung-won has nightmares about her murdering both him and his partner, Lee Jang-gil. Jung-won is also engaged to a young woman, Lee Myung-hyun, a former alcoholic and the owner of a fish and aquarium supply store. Myung-hyun symbolically gives Jung-won a pair of kissing gourami, a species that cannot live without its mate. Jung-won is worried that he cannot tell her about the real nature of his job due to his security clearance.

Jung-won and Jang-gil are contacted by an arms dealer who claims to have information about their quarry, but he is shot dead by Bang-hee before he can give them any information. After digging a bit deeper, they determine that he had been contacted by the assassin at some point, in the effort to acquire something. That something turns out to be CTX, a binary liquid explosive developed by the South Korean government. In its ground state, CTX is indistinguishable from water, but when placed under the right temperature conditions for long enough, a 200mL worth of CTX has a 1 km blast radius. The agents begin to suspect its intended use by the assassins, when Kim, a scientist working at a lab connected to CTX, is assassinated by Bang-hee.

Mu-young and his agents ambush a military convoy with several liters of CTX, killing all the soldiers and making off with the dangerous liquid before the agents could arrive in time to warn them. Jung-won and Jang-gil suspect a leak, as they are always one step too slow. Bang-hee is ordered to eliminate the 'kissing gourami' obstacle. Jung-won meets with Police Chief Ho to borrow outside forces, but Ho accidentally stands in the path of a bullet fired by Bang-hee's sniper rifle.

Mu-young calls Jung-won and issues an ultimatum: he has concealed several CTX bombs around Seoul, and will give him just enough time to find each one before setting them off. He also mockingly mentions Jung-won's fiancé. It is revealed that Mu-young and Jung-won have a history: Mu-young once hijacked a civilian airliner and killed many civilians, but managed to escape by disguising himself as a wounded member of the flight crew.

The first of the CTX bombs is found on top of a department store, but Mu-young lied about the time factor. The bomb explodes just as the bomb disposal team discovers its exact location, resulting in dozens of deaths. Jung-won takes Myung-hyun to hide out at a hotel, and she begins drinking again.

Jung-won suspects Jang-gil as the leak - who suspects the same thing, as Jung-won has twice survived encounters with Bang-hee he should have died in, and bugged Jung-won's car and phone to see if he could learn anything. Jung-won sets a trap by telling Jang-gil he has new information - which Mu-young and his fellow agents step into - but the situation quickly escalates into a firefight, resulting in police and civilian casualties. Several of the Northern agents are killed, while others escape. When Mu-young is cornered, Bang-hee comes in to save him. Jung-won, having survived his stand-off with Mu-young and Bang-hee, follows a wounded Bang-hee. He loses her, but notices the light to the aquarium turn on and covertly enters, discovering a bleeding Myung-hyun removing her disguise. Jung-won walks away, shocked, and conducts a solo investigation into her history with the real, sick Myung-hyun. Mu-young confronts Bang-hee about her hesitancy and constant failure to kill Jung-won, reminding her of their primary objective.

Mu-young calls OP Center, demanding millions as well as a plane for an escape at 2pm in return for the remaining CTX. Myung-hyun's identity is confirmed by the agency later when electronic surveillance devices are discovered in fish decorating the OP Center's office, supplied by her. Jang-gil confronts her in her shop, and is shot by Mu-young. Jung-won suddenly appears with officers, who engage in a firefight with Mu-young and his agents. Mu-young and Myung-hyun escape, while a dying Jang-gil hands Myung-hyun's soccer match ticket to Jung-won, set to start at 2pm.

The terrorists aim to detonate a CTX bomb directly over the Royal Box, housing all senior North and South Korean politicians, at a soccer stadium in the midst of an international friendly match played between North Korea and South Korea. Jung-won attempts to tell OP Center of the ruse and the danger in the stadium but is ignored. He defies orders and rushes to the stadium, where Mu-young, Bang-hee, and other terrorists mingle with the crowd. They find a total ban on all liquids, but enter easily as the CTX and weapons were already planted in the stadium beforehand.

Bang-hee retrieves a hidden Steyr AUG from a restroom cubicle, while Mu-young and his agents tail several patrolling South Korean SWAT officers, who later adjourn to the restrooms. There, the policemen are killed, and their bodies quickly dragged away. Myung-hyun advances into the grandstand with her rifle, while Mu-young and three other men, now disguised as SWAT officers in uniforms stolen from the dead policemen, enter the stadium control room, killing all but one there and forcing the remaining staff to switch on the stadium lights to trigger the CTX. Jung-won arrives at the stadium and notices the lights. Jung-won goes to the control room to have them shut off, but is taken captive. Sik, a rookie OP Center agent, also notices the lights and soon comes in with backup. A violent confrontation in the control room results in the death of all four terrorists, and the lights are switched off in the nick of time. Myung-hyun notices this, and fires at the VIPs, but misses her target. Chasing after the entourage, she kills several more SWAT officers along the way before being confronted by a large group of officers led by Jung-won. As she makes a last-ditch attempt to complete her mission, she is shot dead by Jung-won.

Jung-won later learns that Bang-hee (whom he knew as Myung-hyun) was pregnant with his child, and had left details of the renegade Northern agents' plan and her planned location on his answering machine before leaving for the stadium, but had requested that he not confront her himself, professing her love for him. Jung-won then visits the real Myung-hyun, who is at a hospital for chemotherapy, and Myung-hyun reminisces about Bang-hee with Jung-won. Myung-hyun lets Jung-won listen to that song, and while listening to it, Jung-won is captivated by the lyrics. The scene then fades, while Jung-won, still listening to the song, shuts his eyes.

== Cast ==
- Han Suk-kyu as Yoo Joong-won, a South Korean secret agent who engaged with Bang-hee while disguised as Myung-hyun
- Choi Min-sik as Park Mu-young, a North Korean, a leader for the terrorists
- Song Kang-ho as Lee Jang-gil, also a South Korean secret agent and Yu Jong-won's partner
- Yunjin Kim as Lee Myung-hyun / Lee Bang-hee, a North Korean spy
- Yoon Joo-sang as the chief agent
- Park Yong-woo as Sik, a secret agent
- Johnny Kim as Jung Dae-ho (credited as Derek Kim)
- Lee Seung-shin as a physician
- Kim Soo-ro as a North Korean terrorist
- Jang Hyun-sung as special investigation team member (cameo)
- Hwang Jung-min as special investigation team member (cameo)

== Box office ==
The total budget of the film was US$8.5 million, at the time the single biggest budget allocated to a South Korean film. Part of the funding was covered by the Korean electronics giant Samsung. The film was a critical and financial success in South Korea and broke box office records. Shiri was seen in South Korean cinemas by 6.9 million people, beating the previous record set by Titanic of 4.3 million.

It was also successful throughout the rest of Asia. It opened at number one on its release in Japan and was a top-grossing film when released in Hong Kong. It has also played theatrically in limited engagements in the West. It has since been issued on video worldwide.

== Release ==
Shiri was shown at the 36th Tokyo International Film Festival on October 27, 2023 to celebrate the 25th anniversary of Korean pop culture being introduced to Japan in cooperation with the South Korean Embassy in Japan and the Korean Film Council (KOFIC). The movie was previously released in Japan in 2000.

Shiri was released in 4K Digital on September 13, 2024 in Japan. A South Korean release was done on March 19, 2025. New theatrical posters were released to promote the release.

== Reception ==
The film was voted the favorite film by South Koreans with 11,918 votes in a 2002 online poll of 54,013 people conducted by the South Korean movie channel Orion Cinema Network.

In 2014, Time Out polled several film critics, directors, actors and stunt actors to list their top action films. Shiri was listed at 96th place on this list.

=== Legacy ===
The film would later serve as the basis for the television series Iris, starring Lee Byung-hun and Kim Tae-hee.

== Bibliography ==
- Kyung-hyun Kim (2004). "9. 'Each Man Kills the Thing He Loves': Transgressive Agents, National Security, and Blockbuster Aesthetics in Shiri and Joint Security Area". The Remasculinization of Korean Cinema. Durham and London: Duke University Press. pp. 259–276. ISBN 0-8223-3267-1.
