= Forbidden Dream =

South Korean historical drama film

- Theatrical release poster
- Hangul: 천문: 하늘에 묻는다
- Hanja: 天問: 하늘에 묻는다
- RR: Cheonmun: haneure munneunda
- MR: Ch'ŏnmun: hanŭre munnŭnda
- Directed by: Hur Jin-ho
- Written by: Jung Bum-shik; Lee Ji-min; Kim Seong-tae; Choi Gun-ho
- Produced by: Kim Chul-yong
- Starring: Choi Min-sik; Han Suk-kyu
- Cinematography: Lee Mo-gae
- Edited by: Kim Hyung-joo
- Music by: Jo Seong-woo
- Production company: Hive Media Corp.
- Distributed by: Lotte Entertainment
- Release date: December 26, 2019
- Running time: 132 minutes
- Country: South Korea
- Language: Korean
- Box office: US$13.9 million

Forbidden Dream (Korean: 천문: 하늘에 묻는다; lit. 'Doors to Heaven') is a 2019 South Korean historical drama film directed by Hur Jin-ho and written by Jung Bum-shik, Lee Ji-min, Kim Seong-tae and Choi Gun-ho. Based on a true story, it portrays Sejong the Great (Han Suk-kyu), king of the Joseon dynasty of Korea, and his relationship with his greatest scientist, Jang Yeong-sil (Choi Min-sik). It made its international debut at the 2020 New York Asian Film Festival in August 2020.

== Synopsis ==
King Sejong (Han Suk-kyu), the greatest ruler in Chosun history seeks to enhance national prosperity and military power through astronomy with the help of his greatest scientist, Jang Yeong-sil (Choi Min-sik). For twenty years they forged a relationship but due to an incident, Jang Yeong-sil was removed from his post and disappeared completely.

== Cast ==
- Choi Min-sik as Jang Yeong-sil
- Han Suk-kyu as Sejong
- Shin Goo as Hwang Hŭi
- Kim Hong-pa as Yi Ch'ŏn
- Huh Joon-ho as Cho Mal-saeng
- Kim Tae-woo as Jeong Nam-son
- Kim Won-hae as Cho Soon-saeng
- Yoon Je-moon as Choi Hyo-nam
- Im Won-hee as Lim Hyo-don
- Park Sung-hoon as Lee Hyang
- Jeon Yeo-been as Sa-im
- Oh Hee-joon as Young eunuch

== Accolades ==
Award ceremony	Year	Category	Nominee	Result	Ref.
Baeksang Arts Awards	2020	Best Actor	Han Suk-kyu	Nominated	
Blue Dragon Film Awards	2021	Best Art Direction	Cho Hwa-sung, Choi Hyun-seok	Nominated	
Blue Dragon Film Awards	2021	Best Music	Jo Seong-woo	Nominated	
Buil Film Awards	2020	Best Actor	Han Suk-kyu	Nominated	
Chunsa Film Art Awards	2020	Best Director	Hur Jin-ho	Nominated	
Chunsa Film Art Awards	2020	Best Screenplay	Jung Bum-sik, Lee Ji-min	Nominated	
Chunsa Film Art Awards	2020	Best Actor	Han Suk-kyu	Nominated	
Chunsa Film Art Awards	2020	Best Supporting Actor	Shin Goo	Nominated	
Chunsa Film Art Awards	2020	Technical Award	Jo Hwa-seong	Nominated	
Grand Bell Awards	2020	Best Film	Forbidden Dream	Nominated	
Grand Bell Awards	2020	Best Actor	Han Suk-kyu	Nominated	
Grand Bell Awards	2020	Best Supporting Actor	Shin Goo	Nominated	
Grand Bell Awards	2020	Best Art Direction	Cho Hwa-sung	Nominated	
Grand Bell Awards	2020	Best Lighting	Lee Seung-hwan	Nominated	
Grand Bell Awards	2020	Best Costume Design	Cho Sang-kyung	Nominated	

== See also ==
- The King's Letters
