= The Eternal Empire =

- Theatrical release poster
- Hangul: 영원한 제국
- Hanja: 永遠한 帝國
- RR: Yeongwonhan jeguk
- MR: Yŏngwŏnhan cheguk
- Directed by: Park Jong-won
- Written by: Im Sang-soo; Park Seong-jo; Park Jong-won
- Produced by: Seo Gyeong-seok; Park Keon-seop
- Starring: Ahn Sung-ki
- Cinematography: Chun Jo-myuong
- Edited by: Lee Kyoung-ja
- Music by: Hwang Byungki
- Distributed by: Dae Rim Young Sang
- Release date: January 28, 1995
- Running time: 126 minutes
- Country: South Korea
- Language: Korean
- Box office: $1,556

The Eternal Empire (Korean: 영원한 제국; RR: Yeongwonhan jeguk) is a 1995 South Korean film directed by Park Jong-won. It was chosen as Best Film at the Grand Bell Awards.

== Plot ==
A historical drama depicting political intrigue and power struggles in the early 19th century.

== Cast ==
- Ahn Sung-ki as Lee San, King Jeongjo
- Cho Jae-hyun as Lee In-mong
- Kim Hye-soo as Yoon Sang-ah
- Kim Myung-gon as Jeong Yak-yong
- Choi Jong-won as Shim Hwan-ji
- Kim Hee-ra as Lee Jo-won
- Lee Seung-cheol as Seo Yong-soo
- Kim Il-woo as Jeong Choon-gyo
- Im Il-chan as Goo Jae-gyum
- Kim Jae-rok as Lee Jung-rae
- Shin Cheol-jin as Hyun Seung-heon
- Hyun Gil-soo as Captain Jang Yong-young
- Kwon Il-soo as Seo In-sung
- Yoo Soon-chul as Lee Shi-soo
- Jang In-han as Nam Han-jo
- Jang Jung-kook as Kwon Chul-shin
- Son Jeon as Young-Jo
- Na Gap-sung as Ok-Jang
- Hong Suk-yeon as Captain Hoon-Ryun
- Lee Byung-joon as Captain Po-Do
- Park Jong-chul as Chae Yi-sook / Chae Je-gong
- Park Choong-sun as Left State Councillor
- Kim Ji-woon as Left State Councillor
- Kim Sang-bae as Right State Councillor
- Choi Young-rae as Goo Jae-gyum's teacher
- Lee Kyung-jin as a Warrior
- Kim Kyung-ran as Moo-Dang
- Hong Kyung-in as Crown Prince Lee Gong
- Jo Hak-ja as Na-Pa
- Im Jin-taek as Gum-yool

== Bibliography ==
- "Yeongwonhan geguk". The Complete Index to World Film. Archived from the original on 2012-04-06.
- 영원한 제국. Cine21 (in Korean).

Preceded by The Story of Two Women	Grand Bell Awards for Best Film; 1995	Succeeded by Henequen
