= The Contact (1997 South Korean film) =

- Theatrical release poster
- Hangul: 접속
- Hanja: 接續
- RR: Jeopsok
- MR: Chŏpsok
- Directed by: Chang Yoon-hyun
- Written by: Chang Yoon-hyun; Jo Myeong-joo
- Produced by: Sim Jae-myung
- Starring: Han Suk-kyu; Jeon Do-yeon
- Cinematography: Kim Seong-bok
- Edited by: Park Gok-ji
- Music by: Choi Man-sik; Jo Yeong-wook
- Distributed by: Myung Films
- Release date: 12 September 1997 (South Korea)
- Running time: 105 minutes
- Country: South Korea
- Language: Korean

The Contact (Korean: 접속; RR: Jeopsok) is a 1997 South Korean romantic drama film directed by Chang Yoon-hyun. Starring Han Suk-kyu and Jeon Do-yeon, it was the second highest-grossing Korean film of 1997 with 674,933 admissions, and was awarded the Grand Bell Awards for best picture.

== Plot ==
One day, radio DJ Dong-hyeon receives an anonymous package containing a Velvet Underground record. Dong-hyeon hopes that the record was sent by his ex-lover Young-hye. He decides to play the song Pale Blue Eyes off of that record. At the same time, a home shopping telemarketer, Soo-hyeon, listens to the radio program while driving her car.

The next day, Soo-hyeon makes a request through the internet for Dong-hyeon to play the song again. Dong-hyeon then contacts Soo-hyeon, hoping she is his former girlfriend or someone he knows.

== Cast ==
- Han Suk-kyu as Dong-hyeon
- Jeon Do-yeon as Soo-hyeon
- Chu Sang-mi as Eun-hee
- Park Yong-soo as Tae-ho
- Choi Cheol-ho as Min-yeong
- Kim Tae-woo as Han Ki cheol
- Lee Beom-soo as delivery man
- Kim Min-kyung as female employee at convenience store

== Awards ==
1997 Grand Bell Awards

- Best Film
- Best Editing - Park Gok-ji
- Best Adapted Screenplay - Chang Yoon-hyun
- Best New Actress - Jeon Do-yeon

1997 Blue Dragon Film Awards

- Best New Actress - Jeon Do-yeon

1998 Baeksang Arts Awards

- Most Popular Actress (Film) - Jeon Do-yeon

1998 Korean Association of Film Critics Awards

- Best New Actress - Jeon Do-yeon

Preceded by Henequen	Grand Bell Awards for Best Film; 1997	Succeeded by Spring in My Hometown
