= Brother Anthony =

British-South Korean academic (born 1942)

Brother Anthony Graham Teague
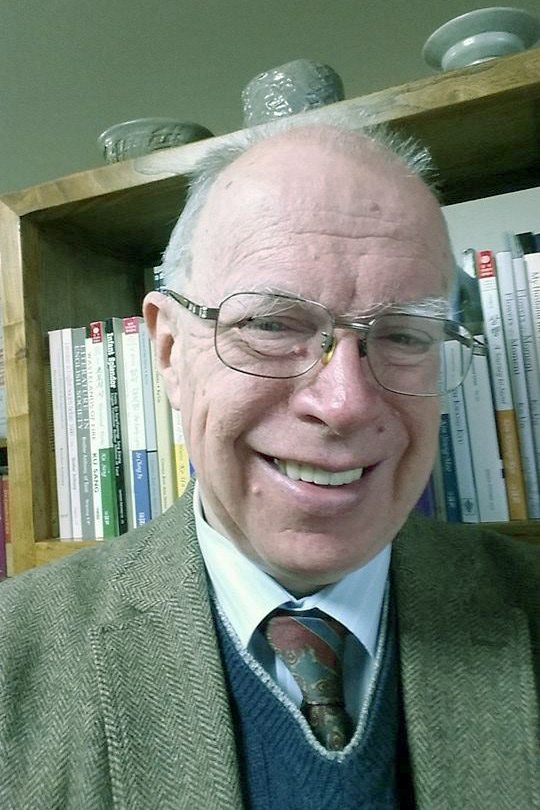
- Brother Anthony receives his MBE on 2 December 2015
- Born: Anthony Graham Teague; January 3, 1942 (age 84)
- Citizenship: South Korean
- Writing career
- Pen name: An Sonjae
- Language: Korean/English/French

Korean name
- Hangul: 안선재
- RR: An Seonjae
- MR: An Sŏnjae
- Website: anthony.sogang.ac.kr

Brother Anthony (born 1942) is a translator, scholar, and member of the Taizé Community. He was born Anthony Graham Teague in the United Kingdom but has since become a naturalized citizen of South Korea under the Korean name An Sonjae (Korean: 안선재).

== Life ==
Anthony Graham Teague was born in 1942 in Cornwall, UK, to Thomas Leslie Teague (February 2, 1914 – March 26, 1985) and Nan Albina Green (July 24, 1911 – February 3, 1991). He studied Medieval and Modern languages at Oxford and in 1969 he joined the Taizé Community in France, a monastic order composed of men from the Protestant, Anglican and Catholic traditions dedicated to spreading the message of trust and reconciliation.

After three years' service in a Philippine slum, in May 1980, Brother Anthony joined other brothers in Korea, invited by the late Archbishop of Seoul, Cardinal Kim Sou-Hwan. He taught English literature at Sogang University, Seoul, for nearly three decades, while translating works of modern Korean literature and also writing books and articles about literature and translation.

Brother Anthony began to translate modern Korean literature in 1988, and since then has published a wide variety of works from such classic Korean authors as Ku Sang, Ko Un, Ch'on Sang-Pyong, So Chong-Ju, Kim Su-Yong, Shin Kyong-Nim, Yi Si-Young, Kim Kwang-Kyu, Ynhui Park, and Yi Mun-yol. In 1991 he won a Modern Korean Literature Translation Award from The Korea Times for his translation of "Headmaster Abe" by Ko Un, and he began serving as one of the contest judges in 1996, with his last year in the role being 2023. In 1994, Brother Anthony became a naturalized Korean citizen, taking on the Korean name An Sonjae, Sonjae being the Korean form of Sudhana, the 'little pilgrim' of the Buddhist scripture The Gandavyuha Sutra.

From January 2011 to December 2020 he served as president of the Royal Asiatic Society Korea Branch, tied for the longest term for an RAS Korea president. He was awarded the Korean government's Order of Cultural Merit, Jade Crown class, in October 2008 for his work in promoting knowledge of Korean literature in the world. He reached retirement age at the start of 2007 and is currently a professor emeritus of Sogang University and a chair-professor of Dankook University. In 2015 he received an MBE. He currently lives in Seoul.

== Works ==
- Classical and Biblical Backgrounds to Western Literature. Seoul: Sogang University Press, 1989, Revised & expanded, 2000.
- Literature in English Society before 1660: Volume One, The Middle Ages. Seoul: Sogang University Press, 1997
- Literature in English Society: Part Two, The Renaissance 1485 - 1660. Seoul: Sogang University Press, 1998
- Textual Criticism of Chaucer's Canterbury Tales. Brother Anthony and Lee Dong-Chun. Seoul: Seoul National University Press, 2002.
- The Korean Way of Tea. By Brother Anthony of Taizé and Hong Kyeong-Hee. Seoul: Seoul Selection, 2007
- Korean Tea Classics. By Brother Anthony of Taizé, Hong Kyeong-Hee and Steven D. Owyoung. Seoul: Seoul Selection, 2010
- Eerie Tales from Old Korea. Compiled by Brother Anthony of Taizé. Seoul: Seoul Selection, 2013
- Brief Encounters: Early Reports of Korea by Westerners. Compiled by Brother Anthony of Taizé and Robert Neff. Seoul: Seoul Selection, 2016
- Romantic Tales from Old Korea. Compiled by Brother Anthony of Taizé. Seoul: Seoul Selection, 2016

== Translated works ==
Translations are from Korean into English unless otherwise indicated.

Poetry

- Ku Sang, Wastelands of Fire // Wasteland Poems Forest Books 1990 // DapGae 2000
- Ku Sang, A Korean Century (Christopher's River; Diary of the Fields) Forest Books 1991 (Out of print)
- Ku Sang, Infant Splendor (Online text and images) Samseong 1991 (Out of print)
- Kim Kwang-kyu, Faint Shadows of Love Forest Books 1991 (Out of print)
- Ko Un, The Sound of my Waves Cornell EAS 1991 // Cornell – DapGae
- Midang, So Chong-ju, Early Lyrics Forest Books 1991 // Cornell - DapGae 1998
- Ch'on Sang-pyong, Back to Heaven Cornell EAS 1995 // Cornell - DapGae 1996
- Ko Un, What? : 108 Zen Poems (formerly Beyond Self) Parallax (Berkeley) 2008 (1997)
- Shin Kyong-nim, Farmers' Dance Cornell - DapGae 1999
- Kim Su-young, Shin Kyong-nim, Lee Si-young Variations Cornell 2001
- Ku Sang, Even the Knots on Quince Trees Tell Tales DapGae 2004
- Ku Sang, Eternity Today Seoul Selection 2005
- Kim Young-Moo, Virtual Reality DapGae 2005
- Kim Kwang-kyu, The Depths of a Clam White Pine Press 2005
- Ko Un, Ten Thousand Lives Green Integer (Los Angeles) 2005
- Kim Kwang-Kyu, A Journey to Seoul, DapGae 2006
- Ko Un, Flowers of a Moment, BOA 2006
- Chonggi Mah, Eyes of Dew, White Pine Press 2006
- Special Children, Poems for Planting Love, Seoul Selection 2008
- Ko Un, Songs for Tomorrow, Green Integer 2009
- Kim Yeong-Nang, Until Peonies Bloom, MerwinAsia 2010
- Kim Seung-Hee, Walking on a Washing Line, Cornell EAS 2011
- Ko Un, ChaRyong's Kiss (bilingual, poems for children about his daughter), Ba-u-sol 2011
- Ko Un, Himalaya Poems, Green Integer 2011
- Ko Un, First Person Sorrowful, Bloodaxe 2012
- (From the French) Brother Pierre Etienne, Selected Poems, Taize, 2013.
- Hong Yunsook, Sunlight in a Distant Place. Foreign Language Publications Ohio State U. 2013
- Ynhui Park, Shadows of the Void, Seoul Selection 2014
- Lee Si-Young, Patterns, Green Integer 2014
- Ko Un, Maninbo: Peace & War, Bloodaxe 2015
- Kim Soo-Bok Beating on Iron Green Integer 2015
- Anthology, The Colors of Dawn, Manoa, 2016
- Do Jong-Hwan, No Flower Blooms Without Wavering, Seoul Selection, 2016
- Oh Sae-Young, Night Sky Checkerboard, Phoneme Media, 2016
- Shim Bo-Seon, Fifteen Seconds without Sorrow, Parlor Press, 2016
- Jeong Ho-Seung, A Letter Not Sent, Seoul Selection 2016
- Jeong Ho-Seung, Though flowers fall, I have never forgotten you, Seoul Selection 2016
- Ko Hyeong-Ryeol, Grasshoppers' Eyes, Parlor Press. 2017
- Lee Seong-Bok, Ah, Mouthless Things, Green Integer 2017
- Ko Un, Poems by Ko Un, Asia 2017
- Ahn Do-Hyun, Poems by Ahn Do-Hyun, Asia 2017
- Kim Jong-Gil, A Black Kite, MerwinAsia 2017
- Ahn Sang-Hak, Poems by Ahn Sang-Hak, Asia 2018
- Kim Sa-in, Liking in Silence, White Pine. 2019
- Yoo Anjin, As I Walk Alone, MerwinAsia 2020
- An Hyeon-mi, Deep Work, Asia 2020
- Kim Seung-Hee, Hope is Lonely, Arc 2020
- Ahn Joo-cheol, Feeling Never Stops, Asia 2020
- Kim Soo-yeol Homo Maskus, Asia 2020
- Park Nohae Reading While Walking Along. 느린걸음 2021
- Lee Sul-ya Cave Boys Asia 2021
- Ko Un Maninbo Volumes 21-25 Green Integer 2022
- Moon Dong-man Thinking Less About Sad Things Asia 2022
- Sin Yong-mok Concealed Words Black Ocean 2022
- Kim Ilyeon All The Daughters of The Earth Seoul Selection 2023
- Ko Un Maninbo 26-30 Green Integer 2023
- Song Kyeong-dong I'll Write Again Tomorrow Asia 2023
- Kim Byung-ho Love Songs Sung with the Body Asia 2023
- Park Nohae Dawn of Labor Hawaii 2024

Fiction

- Yi Mun-yol, The Poet Harvill Press 1994 / Vintage 2001
- Lee Oyoung, The General's Beard / Phantom Legs Homa & Sekey 2002
- Ko Un, Little Pilgrim Parallax (Berkeley) 2005
- Bang Hyeon-seok, Off to Battle at Dawn. Translated with Dafna Zur. Asia Publishers, Bilingual Edition 2013
- Yi Mun-yol, Son of Man. Dalkey Archive 2015
- J. M. G. Le Clézio, Bitna: Under the Sky of Seoul Seoul Selection (USA) 2017
- Jeong Ho-seung, Loving. Seoul Selection 2020
- Jeong Ho-seung, Lonesome Jar. Seoul Selection 2020
- J. M. Lee Broken Summer Amazon Crossing 2022
- Lee Geum-yi The Picture Bride Forge/Scribe 2022
- Lee Geum-yi Can't I Go Instead Forge/Scribe 2023
- Im Seong-sun The Consultant Raven Books 2023

Non-fiction

- Mok Sun-Ok, My Husband the Poet, Seoul Selection 2006
- (From the French) Daniel de Montmollin, The Practice of Stoneware Glazes: minerals, rocks, ashes. Paris: La Revue de la Ceramique et du Verre. 2005.
- St. Andrew Kim Dae-geon The Letters of Saint Andrew Kim Dae-geon The Research Foundation of Korean Church History 2021
- Thomas Choe The Letters of the Venerable Father Thomas Choe Yang-eop The Research Foundation of Korean Church History 2022

== Awards ==
- The Korea Times Translation Award (1991)
- Daesan Translation Award (1995)
- Korean Republic's Literary Award
- Korean PEN Translation Award
- Korean government's Order of Cultural Merit, Jade Crown class, in October 2008.
- Honorary MBE (Order of the British Empire) December 2015.
- 2024 Manhae Literary Award
