= Chang Yoon-hyun =

South Korean film director (born 1967)

- Born: July 11, 1967 (age 59); South Korea
- Occupation: Film director

Korean name
- Hangul: 장윤현
- RR: Jang Yunhyeon
- MR: Chang Yunhyŏn

Chang Yoon-hyun (Korean: 장윤현; born July 11, 1967) is a South Korean film director. Chang's directorial debut, the romance film The Contact (1997), was the second best selling film of 1997. It also catapulted actress Jeon Do-yeon to stardom in her film debut. His second feature Tell Me Something (1999) - billed as a "hard-core thriller", was one of 1999's biggest hits.

== Filmography ==
=== As director ===
- Oh! Country of Dreams (1989)
- The Night Before the Strike (1990)
- The Contact (1997)
- Tell Me Something (1999)
- Some (2004)
- Hwang Jin Yi (2007)
- Gabi (2012)
- Peaceful Island (2015)

=== As screenwriter ===
- The Contact (1997)
- Tell Me Something (1999)

=== As producer ===
- Love Wind Love Song (1999) (also credited for music)
- Tell Me Something (1999)

=== As executive producer ===
- Flower Island (2001)
- Wild Card (2003)
- Liar (2004)
- R-Point (2004) (also credited as planner)
- Ssunday Seoul (2006)

=== As other crew ===
- Another Public Enemy (2005)
- The King and the Clown (2005)
- Hanbando (2006)

=== As investor ===
- Princess Aurora (2005)
- Lost in Love (2006)
- Ssunday Seoul (2006)
- The Customer Is Always Right (2006)
- Love Phobia (2006)
- Hanbando (2006)
- Fly High (2006)
- Puzzle (2006)
- Radio Star (2006)
- Righteous Ties (2006)
- Project Makeover (2006)

== Awards ==
- 1997 34th Grand Bell Awards: Best Adapted Screenplay (The Contact)
- 1998 18th Korean Association of Film Critics Awards: Best New Director (The Contact)
