= Park Jong-won (director) =

South Korean filmmaker (born 1958)

- Born: October 20, 1958 (age 67); South Korea
- Occupations: Film director, screenwriter

Korean name
- Hangul: 박종원
- Hanja: 朴鐘元
- RR: Bak Jongwon
- MR: Pak Chongwŏn

Park Jong-won (Korean: 박종원; born 20 October 1960) is a South Korean film director and screenwriter.

== Filmography ==
- Kuro Arirang (1989)
- Our Twisted Hero (1992)
- The Eternal Empire (1994)
- Seven Reasons Why Beer Is Better Than a Lover (1996)
- Rainbow Trout (1999)
- Paradise Villa (2001)

== Awards ==
- 1992 13th Blue Dragon Film Awards: Best Director (Our Twisted Hero)
- 1995 33rd Grand Bell Awards: Best Director (The Eternal Empire)
