= Yi Munyeol =

South Korean writer (born 1948)

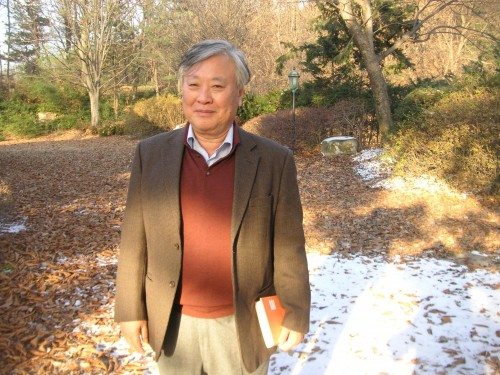
- Born: May 18, 1948 (age 78); Cheongun-dong, Seoul, Korea
- Occupation: Writer
- Writing career
- Language: Korean
- Genre: Fiction

Korean name
- Hangul: 이문열
- Hanja: 李文烈
- RR: I Munyeol
- MR: I Munyŏl

Yi Munyeol (born May 18, 1948) is a South Korean writer. Yi's given name at birth was Yeol; the character Mun (which translates as "writer") was added after he took up a writing career. His works include novels, short stories and Korean adaptations of classic Chinese novels. An informal count has estimated that over 30 million copies of his books have been sold and, as of 2021, they have been translated into 21 languages. His works have garnered many literary awards and many have been adapted for film and television.

== Life ==
Yi Munyeol's father was a member of Korea's "wealthy elite". He had a 40-room residence and 200 pyeong, or 660 square meters, of land. He studied in Britain and taught agriculture at Seoul National University. But at the outbreak of the Korean War, he joined the communist cause, abandoned his family and moved to North Korea.

Yi Munyeol was born in Cheongun-dong, a neighborhood in central Seoul, South Korea in 1948, but the outbreak of the Korean War and his father's defection to North Korea forced his family to move about until they settled in Yeongyang County, North Gyeongsang Province, the ancestral seat of his family. The fact that his father defected dramatically affected his life, as he was seen and treated as "the son of a political offender", and was "passed around among relatives. He dropped out of the College of Education of Seoul National University in 1970. He then studied for the Korean bar exam and failed three times. He entered literary contests with little success. The manuscript of Son of Man, which later became his debut novel in book form, was rejected. He married in 1973 and then joined the army to complete his compulsory military service. After he was discharged from the army, he taught school at a private institute.

Finally in 1977, one of his short stories received honorable mention in literary awards given by Daegu Maeil Newspaper, after which he adopted the name Yi Munyeol. He was awarded The Dong-A Ilbo award for a short story, Saehagok, in 1979. In 1979, he was also able at last to have his novel, The Son of Man, published and it won the prestigious Today's Writer Award. He then published a series of novels and short stories including Golden Phoenix, Hail to the Emperor, Age of Heroes and Our Twisted Hero, each of which won awards. He reached the peak of his literary productivity in the 1980s and 1990s but continued to write. From 1994 to 1997, he taught Korean language and literature at Sejong University. He is currently a chair professor at Hankuk University of Foreign Studies.

Since 1999, he has also served as the head of Buak Literary Center, residential teaching facility for writers which he founded. He also has close ties to Gwangsan Literature Research Institute, in Dudeul Village (his hometown in Yeongyang county) and was instrumental in establishing its library which contains 20,000 books.

== Work ==
Yi has written novels, short stories, and Korean adaptations of classic Chinese novels. In 2014, he stated, "I have written 50 short stories and novellas in six volumes, 18 novels in 20 volumes, and two epic novels in 22 volumes. In addition, I have written two volumes of essays, one travelogue, and compiled and annotated a total of 20 volumes of Chinese classics, as well as 10 volumes of short and medium-length masterpieces of world literature."

Yi's works include two literary tendencies. The first tendency is utilization of an allegorical view of Korean society, one that traces the ways in which various lives (recent, historical and in legend) are shaped and governed by dominant ideology and power, including, in particular, the tension between authoritarianism and liberalism (exemplified by Son of Man and Our Twisted Hero) and between traditionalism and modernism (exemplified by The Golden Phoenix and The Old Hatter). The first aspect of this tendency has been described as an emphasis on the adverse consequences of "reckless faith in ideology, belief or theories which people often cling to in the context of history, religion and academic studies". The second tendency is a focus on his internal world, fictionalizing his experience of growing up and the process by which his worldview was formed (exemplified by his epic novel Border and the short story Appointment with My Brother). In addition, some of his novels display a particularly high regard for poetry and art.

An analysis of Yi's works by Jae-Bok Lee suggested that they encompassed several genres some of which include: "artists novels" (e.g. The Poet, The Golden Phoenix and Bisson), historical depictions (e.g. Age of Heroes and Border), romantic love stories (e.g. Lette's Song and All That Falls Has Wings), characterizations of political views unconsciously internalized in Korean society, especially men in Korea, (e.g. Choice), and, in Jae-Bok Lee view, an excessively political novel, Homo Ececutans. One of Yi's best selling novels Son of Man (approximately 2 million copies sold) is simultaneously a detective story and a treatise of his views on Jewish and Christian ideologies derived from a study of comparative religion and mythology. Hail to the Emperor combines a farce with a realistic depiction of the suffering of the Korean people during the Japanese occupation and the Korean War. Ji-moon Suh, translator of many of his works, stated that Yi is a master of all fictional forms. He provided short descriptions of a wide selection of Yi's works that support this assertion.

=== Examples ===
==== Son of Man ====
Son of Man explores the theme of the complex relationship between God and humanity through the eyes of two characters who are doubtful of the Jewish and Christian worldviews. The work consists of two novels, a detective story and the unpublished manuscript of a novel written by the victim of a murder. The latter, the inner story and core of the work, imagines the character of Ahasuerus, the Wandering Jew. In the first half of the story, Ahasuerus leaves his home in Judea and embarks on a quest to understand the meanings of religious ideologies from across the ancient world. As described in a Korean Literature Now review, his travels to the centers of religious thought lead him to conclude that all were the product of "political intrigue and the base desires of a frightened populace". In the second half of the story, he returns to his homeland. He undertakes a fast in the desert where he meets the Great Spirit, an opponent of the Jewish god, Yahweh. In an alternate telling of the gospel story of the Temptation of Jesus, he also finds Jesus, who is similarly fasting, and attempts to convince him of the unreasonableness of the laws of Yahweh, with respect to free will, human suffering and punishment for sin. Ahasuerus petitions Jesus to turn rocks into bread to feed a suffering humanity, to no avail. A similar confrontation occurs when Jesus is giving the Sermon on the Mount, when Ahasuerus accuses Jesus of offering "empty promises of paradise". Finally, he meets Jesus on his way to Calvary and refuses to aid him. This act leads him to be sentenced to wander the earth forever, a fate which allows him to continue his search for truth. The unpublished manuscript of the novel was written by a former theology student, Min Yoseop, who has been murdered. He left seminary, disillusioned by the perceived hypocrisy he found there and, together with a devoted follower, attempts to relieve the suffering of downtrodden Koreans (so prevalent after the Korean war) in a more direct way. The text of the manuscript provides clues to solving the murder. There are strong parallels between Min Yoseop and Ahasuerus, both of whom are consumed by their philosophical ideals. The tragic outcome was considered an expression of Yi's pessimism concerning the ability of people to save themselves. Brother Anthony, who translated this work, believes that the work represents criticism of Protestant Christianity in South Korea after the Korean war. At the time, some pastors preyed on the vulnerability of their parishioners for their own economic advantage. He suggested that Yi's views may have been influenced by his upbringing which was steeped in Confucianism. The work has been revised several times, most recently in 2020. In an interview that was conducted while that revision was underway, Yi stated that when the original book was published, the Korean public had very little knowledge of comparative religion and he believed that his work helped to fill that void. It was well documented with 335 footnotes, although these were not included in the English translation. An academic review concluded that it was derived from apocrypha, Gnosticism and the perspective of Korean Minjung theology (literally the peoples' theology).

==== The Golden Phoenix ====
Suh Ji-moon published a translation of Yi Munyeol's Garuda (1981) with the title The Golden Phoenix in 1999 as part of a collection of seven Korean short stories. In his introduction, Suh wrote that it "represented Yi's serious interest in Oriental heritage and modern applicability". It expresses the conflicting interest of a traditional calligraphy master and his technically proficient student, but one who he considered to lack the all-encompassing dedication to art that he required. The gifted disciple, Kojuk, "rebels against the teacher’s overly ethicized and ascetic principles, in preference for a more formal concept of beauty". There is a painful rift in their relationship but in the end the master left a request for Kojuk to write the banner for his coffin. After that Kojuk becomes as dedicated as his master and burns his works after deciding that none is exemplary of true art.

The work was also translated by Brother Anthony in 1999, with the title Garuda. In a note Brother Anthony explained that Garuda is a mythical man-bird with golden wings which first evolved in Indian mythology. The relevance of the title was noted in a plot summary by a staff writer for Korea.net. The master had admonished his disciple that (Brother Anthony's translation): "In writing, let your spirit be like that of Garuda who cleaves the blue ocean to grab at a dragon and soars with it in his clutch, let your intelligence be as thorough and solid as that of Gandhahastin [the fragrant elephant] who splits a stream from below, then crosses it...". After their rift, Kojuk had scoffed at this idea. However, at the end of his life, while Kojuk burns his work, Yi writes: "And then Kojuk saw it. Suddenly soaring up in the midst of the flames, Garuda, vast, with brilliant golden wings, powerful in flight".

==== The Old Hatter / You Can't Go Home Again ====
In The Old Hatter (translated into English by Brother Anthony) young boys play pranks on the last traditional artisan in their village. The Old Hatter's grandfather had made four hats for kings. It is only after they mature that the boys realize his greatness. The gat, the traditional hat made from horsehair or very fine bamboo strips and worn over a man's top knot, had been outlawed by the Japanese colonial authorities along with the top knot itself. Nevertheless, the gat was still worn by a few men in their out of the way village at the start of the story. In the end, he had no customers for his final masterpiece, so he burns it at the grave of the man he hoped to give it to in life. He himself dies soon after. The Old Hatter, is one of 16 stories in a compilation called You Can't Go Home Again. Associated commentary noted that this compilation written "on the theme of the modern Korean's loss of his home town in the physical, spiritual, and psychological senses, reveals [Yi's] obstinate conservatism but also his genuine and deep regret over the passing not only of a way of life but the frame of mind that created and sustained that way of life." Yi has stated that his observations of life in Dudeul Village, his hometown in early life, were the primary inspiration for these stories.

==== Hail to the Emperor! ====
Hail to the Emperor! deals with the heated competition of imperial world powers around Korea at the end of the 19th century and goes on through the Japanese colonial era, the Korean War and the period of military dictatorial rule, penetrating through the modern history of Korea. With a Don Quixote-esque protagonist, the novel adopts a rich traditional style of prose displaying a comprehensive understanding of traditional East Asian literature, and drawing readers into the narrative with powerful descriptions of the turbulent history of Korea. Michelle Tanenbaum, in a review of the influence of Cervantes' Don Quixote on Korean literature concluded that Yi's Hail to the Emperor! was highly successful in capturing the spirit of the original novel. The protagonist, always referred to as the Emperor, "manifests a madness for excessive reading; he seeks out adventures that are directed toward the search for justice; he is accompanied by assistants who are equally mad; he inhabits the world of the past, which of course has vanished; and finally, he repeatedly commits insane acts, transforming the work into a comedy."

The Emperor believes that he is ordained by heaven to found a new dynasty to replace the Yi (Joseon) dynasty and that the new Chong dynasty will prosper for 800 years as predicted in the secret prophetic text, Chong-kam-rok, also known as Jeonggamnok. His dream is to be a ruler who will free the kingdom of foreign domination, both military and cultural. The latter is presented as a seemingly impossible task, a struggle that would require "madness" to sustain over a lifetime. Sol Sun-bung, author of the preface to his English translation, noted that although Emperor's dream of becoming a ruler of the people failed in a practical sense, nonetheless at his death, he achieves "greater eminence by transcending all worldly preoccupations".

==== Our Twisted Hero ====
Our Twisted Hero, set in the latter part of the era of military dictatorial rule, brings us a microcosm of society as demonstrated in an elementary school classroom, which serves as a metaphor for Korean society at the time. When the protagonist is forced to move from his high-class school in Seoul to a provincial school, he finds that his fifth grade class is controlled by a charismatic but corrupt student monitor. He resists submission to the bully as long as he can and finds himself an outcast. He finally capitulates in a dramatic scene, after which he is elevated to second in command. Despite the oppression, the class attains outstanding academic and athletic status due to the leadership of the class monitor. The bully is deposed when a new sixth grade teacher forces the students to acknowledge their subservience and to stand up to their oppressor. The new teacher not only brutally thrashes the bully but also the boys who let "what was rightfully yours" be taken away. The protagonist is the only student who refuses to denounce him. After the monitor is deposed, an election for a new monitor is held. Prior to the election, the sixth grade teacher hands out copies of U.S. President Kennedy's Profiles in Courage, a symbol of an idealized liberal democratic system. A new more democratic order is imposed, but that leads to bickering and loss in classroom achievement.

In a coda, the protagonist looks back on his life. He had graduated from a prominent university, but had declined to work with one of the chaebols, which he viewed as authoritarian, hypocritical and corrupt. He had taken a job in sales, but that job was also dependent on the chaebols. Disillusioned, he had become a private institute (hagwon) lecturer of humble means. At that point, he learns that his fellow students have met with varying levels of success. Some have done quite well, without logical reason. As described in a scholarly review by Jini Kim Watson, he "feels as if 'I had been thrown into a cruel kingdom that ran things as it wished'. What is striking is that this 'cruel kingdom' now no longer refers to [the student monitor's] regime, nor the new teacher's violent reforms, nor even the chaebol businesses. In the coda, corruption, lack of freedom, and the arbitrary rule of hypocrites turn out to better describe the normative conditions of the postcolonial nation under globalized post-Fordism." At the end, he chances to see the monitor being arrested as a petty crook. The protagonist cries but is unable to determine why. His confusion also leaves the reader unable to determine the appropriate allegory.

In London Book Fair event interviews in 2014, Yi stated that had Our Twisted Hero been written realistically rather than allegorically, it never would have been published because of the censorship in South Korea in the 1980s when it was written. He went on to comment that after Chun Doo-hwan (military strongman) became the president of South Korea (1980), there was an understanding for intellectuals that if they stayed quiet, they wouldn't be punished.

==== Pilon's Pig ====
Pilon's Pig also narrates a revolt against oppression. In this case, the protagonist is forced to take a troop car on his return home after being discharged from the army. He meets a fellow soldier he trained with in boot camp who was known then as Hong "Dunghead" for his simplicity and lack of formal education. The train car is taken over by a few elite marine special forces members, who begin to extort money from the ordinary soldiers. Suddenly the tables are turned, and the soldiers revolt against their oppressors and begin to beat them mercilessly. As the situation turns desperate, the protagonist slips into another car to find Hong "Dunghead" was already there. Both are thus able to avoid the aftermath when the melee is finally broken up by the military police. The last paragraph relates the legend of "Pilon's Pig". As noted in a review by Charles Montgomery, it refers to a legend about a great skeptical philosopher, Pyrrho of Elis. The story goes that when he was caught in a storm at sea, his fellow passengers were in despair. Nevertheless, Pyrrho remained calm. When asked how he kept his composure he pointed to a pig that was happily eating as if nothing were amiss and said "that this is the unperturbed way a wise man should live in all situations" In a critique of the novel included in the afterword of the bilingual edition (Korean and English), Bak Choel-hwa considered the work an allegory depicting the dark side of Korean society and commented that if Hong is the "pig" then the protagonist is "a member of the powerless educated class, a "Pilon" who makes no attempt to stop the madness".

==== The Poet ====
Yi's award-winning The Poet and The Thief was incorporated into a larger novel, The Poet, which is available in an English translation by Brother Anthony. It is the novelized biography of Kim Pyong-yon whose grandfather was executed as a traitor. Punishment for such a crime extended over three generations. Kim's death sentence was commuted but he and his remaining family (like Yi's family) lost the privileges of their former high status. In a story well known to Koreans, he had entered a poetry contest without acknowledging (or in other accounts without knowing) his true identity, wrote a poem critical of his grandfather and was declared the winner. However, the guilt of that betrayal led him to eventually take up the life of a wandering poet. As he went from village to village, he exchanged poems for food and shelter. In his travels, he wore a large bamboo hat as protection from sun and rain (or in some accounts as a symbol of his shame). Thus, he became known as Kim SakGat (or Kim Bamboo Hat). As depicted in this narrative, his poems, which often ridiculed the ruling elite, were a work of genius but were somehow lacking in authenticity. A chance encounter with a Taoist poet known as the Old Drunkard leads to a transformation described by Brother Anthony, as a vision that "poetry has nothing at all to do with words, techniques, or themes, but with being". The poet achieves harmony with nature and at times is seen to "vanish behind clouds and mist". Peter Lee noted that this imagery is recurrent in Korean poetry and represents the highest praise for a poet-recluse in a Buddhist or Taoist context.

==== Age of Heroes ====
In Age of Heroes, his protagonist is the eldest son of a prominent Confucian family. Similar to Yi's own father, he has communist sympathies. He takes up the leftist cause only to be disillusioned. Caught up in his idealism, he ignores the danger to his family. His mother and wife are left to save the family. As described in a plot summary by Dong-Wook Shin, the protagonist insists the war is "for the people", but when his mother rhetorically asks, "What people are you talking about? I see no such people in the south and don't think there will be any more in the north. [Are they not] something that exists only in your words? And yet for that ghost of yours you dare to sacrifice innocent lives?"

==== Appointment with My Brother ====
In Appointment with My Brother, Yi Munyeol imagines meeting with his half brother, born to his father and a new wife in North Korea. After the protagonist learns that his father has died after a 40-year separation, he makes an appointment to meet his North Korean half-brother and discovers that, despite their ideological differences, they have strong family ties. Their bond is cemented after drinking soju, a strong Korean drink, after a makeshift ceremony to honor their father. Heinz Insu Fenkl, the translator of the 2017 version of the novel, offered this assessment: "Yi Mun-yol's Meeting with My Brother offers a sobering, disillusioning, and yet poignant and hopeful perspective on the volatile relationship between the divided Koreas."

==== Frontier Between Two Empires ====
One of Yi's most ambitious works is Frontier Between Two Empires [also known as Borderor The Margins], an epic novel in 12 volumes. The title symbolizes the United States and the former Soviet Union. It is essentially a sequel to Age of Heroes in describing the lives of a family left behind in South Korea after their father defaults to North Korea. It characterizes the hardships brought about by the Korean War and the imprint of superpower rivalry. As described in a PhD thesis by Hyebin Hong, "the novel illuminates the comprehensive implications of [Korean] political and economic subservience, reflected through a single family’s challenges".

In a critique of his own work, he stated the premise of the book was that in order to secure the South Korean border the United States imposed Western capitalism and the South Korean government used absolute authority to enforce it. "As a result, South Korea becomes a society where the only 'freedom' allowed is the pursuit of money; and the dreaming of a better society or individual life is banned. Thus, various entities, which want to be freed from this evil axiom, spring forth. However, their good intentions are soon distorted. They turn antagonistic toward those who do not have faith in their good intentions, while demanding absolute obedience from those who believe in their good intentions."

==== Lette's Song ====
Lette's Song is ostensibly a love story/female coming of age story. It takes the form of a woman, Lee Hee-won, reading her diary on the day before she is to be married. While reading, she relives her past romantic affair with an older married man, Min Seung-woo. He is an artist; and she tries to emulate his commitment to art by becoming a poet. She attempts to entice him into a more sexual relationship; but he resists her advances by referring to her as a sister. When she tells him of her intent to become a poet, he responds (loose translation): "Art is nothing special. It's all useless and was something that only lowly people like clowns used to do in the past. Besides, if a woman gets involved with such lowly people, it's a surefire way to ruin her life. It's better to just get married and live well". He eventually breaks off the relationship reasoning that he is upholding his moral integrity as a true artist in an increasingly corrupt society, i.e.: (loose translation): "Min Seung-woo realizes morality through art, and through that morality, he recognizes the corrupt desire of the adultery he was committing. He rejects the corrupt desire and the life as a corrupt artist for the sake of the authenticity of art...".

In a 45-page analysis, Oh Jae-un concluded that Lette's Song was conceived as a version of the novel, The Sorrows of Young Werther by Goethe in which Lee Hee-won takes the role of a female Werther and Min Seung-woo, the role of a male Lotte, the sensible married woman with whom Werther is infatuated. According to another commentator, it is not a popular romance novel but it can be an artist’s novel that deals with the youth and development of an individual who becomes a painter, musician, or poet", best exemplified by Min Seung-woo. In that sense, Lee Hee-won is not the first person protagonist but the first person observer. Furthermore, Min Seung-woo represents Yi Munyeol's alter ego.

The title refers to the Lethe river in Greek mythology, a river of the underworld of Hades. Those who drank from it experienced complete forgetfulness. The artist tells her that a married woman must cross the river, drink from it and forget the past. "Fill your dreams and memories with the rest of your life" he says. Commentator Oh stated that in her view this last farewell ritual is (loose translation): "a metaphor that divides the past and present into this side and the other side of the river, and then substitutes the process of crossing the river with the growth of a woman. However, what is seen here is not growth, but rather sounds like a compulsion to forget and liquidate all the agony and conflict of her fierce youth ... in some sense like a complete betrayal of the essential meaning of 'growth' ".

==== Translations of classical Chinese works ====
In addition to original works, Yi did large multivolume Korean adaptations of classic Chinese novels including Romance of the Three Kingdoms, Water Margin and Legends of Chu and Han. Brother Anthony stated that Romance of the Three Kingdoms became enormously popular and still remains one of his best-selling works. As of 2023, it has sold over 20 million copies, making it Korea's number one best-selling novel of all time.

=== Association with book publishers ===
Yi had a long association with the Korean publishing company, Minumsa, which published his work over a 40-year period. This association was broken in 2020 when another publishing company, RH Korea, began to reissue some of his work including Romance of the Three Kingdoms and Son of Man.

=== World reception and adaptations ===
Yi has been awarded almost every major national literary prize, and his works have been translated into 21 different languages as of 2021. An informal count has estimated that over 30 million copies of his books have been sold. An estimated 50 thousand copies have been sold in France. One of his works was also selected by the German Literature Society as one of the best publications of 2011. In 2011, Yi Munyeol was also the first Korean fiction writer to have a story appear in The New Yorker ("An Anonymous Island", translated by Heinz Insu Fenkl). Many of Yi's novels have been adapted for film including: Our Twisted Hero, Portrait of Days of Youth, Our Joyful Young Days, Anonymous Island, Son of Man, Lette's Song, All That Falls Has Wings. The first four of these are available with English captions from the Korean Classic Film Archive Website. His novel, Fox Hunting, was adapted for a musical play, The Last Empress, which depicts the life of Empress Myeongseong, who the Japanese agents referred to as a fox spirit and their operation to assassinate her as fox hunting. The play was performed in Seoul, London and New York.

== Awards ==
Yi has won numerous literary awards including the following:

– Dong-A Ilbo award (1979) for Saehagok
– Today's Writer Award (1979) for Son of Man
– Dong-in Literary Award (1982) for Golden Phoenix, also known as Garuda
– Korea Literature Prize (1983) for Hail to the Emperor
– Joongang Literary Award (1984) for Age of Heroes
– Yi Sang Literary Award (1987) for Our Twisted Hero
– Hyundae Munhak Award (1992) The Poet and The Thief
– Republic of Korean Culture and Arts Award (1992)
– France Medal of Cultural and Artistic Merit(1992)
– 21st Century Literature Award (1998) for The Night Before, Or the Last Night of This Era
– Ho-am Prize for the Arts (1999) for Border
– The National Academy of Arts Award (2009)
– Dongni Literature Prize (2012) for Lithuanian Woman

== Works ==
A selected list of novels, short stories, translations of Chinese classical novels.

- Saehagok (새하곡 Saehagok 1979)
- Son of Man (사람의 아들 Saram-ui adeul 1979, reissued in 1993, 2004 and 2020)
- Bison (들소 Deulso 1979)
- Hail to the Emperor! (황제를 위하여 Hwangjae-reul wihayeo 1980–1982)
- A Snail's Outing (달팽이의 외출 Dalpaeng-i nadeul-i 1980)
- At This Desolate Station (이 황량한 역에서 I Hwanglyanghan yeog-eseo 1980)
- You Will Never Return to Your Homeland (그대 다시는 고향에 가지 못하리 Geudae dasineun gohyangae gaji mothari 1980)
- The Golden Phoenix (금시조 Geumsijo 1981), [also known as Golden Age or Garuda] included in a Korean language anthology (East-West Cultural History, 1983, with the same title)
- Portrait of Days of Youth (젊은 날의 초상 Junnareolmeui chosang 1979–1981)
- Anonymous Island (익명의 섬 Ingmyeongui Seom 1982)
- Lette's Song (레테의 연가 Lette-ui yeon-ga 1983)
- The Age of Heroes (영웅시대 Yeongungsidae 1982–1984)
- Our Twisted Hero (우리들의 일그러진 영웅 Urideul-ui ilgeureojin yeongung 1987)
- All That Falls Has Wings (추락하는 것은 날개가 있다 Chulaghaneun geos-eun nalgaega issda 1988)
- The Three Kingdoms (삼국지 Samgugji 1988), 10 volumes
- Pilon's Pig (필론의 돼지 Pillon-ui dwaeji 1989)
- The Poet (시인 Si-in 1991)
- The Shadow of Darkness (어둠의 그늘 Eodum-ui geulimja 1991)
- Water Margin (수호지 Suhoji 1994), 10 volumes
- An Appointment with My Brother (아우와의 만남 Auwaui mannam 1994)
- Fox Hunting (여우사냥 Yeou sanyang 1995)
- For Those that have Disappeared (사라진 것들을 위하여 Salajin geosdeul-eul wihayeo 1995)
- Choice (선택 Seontaeg 1997)
- Frontier Between Two Empires [also known as Border] (변경 Pyŏn'gyŏng 1986–1998), 12 Volumes
- Twofold Song (두겹의 노래 Dugyeobui norae 2004), bilingual
- Legends of Chu and Han (초한지 Chohanji 2002–2008), 10 volumes
- Homo Executans (호모 엑세쿠탄스 Homo ekskutanseu 2006)
- Lithuanian Woman (리투아니아 여인 Lituania yeoin 2011)
- The Night Before, Or the Last Night of This Era (전야, 혹은 시대의 마지막 밤 Jeon-ya, hog-eun sidaeui majimag bam 2016)

== Works in translation (English) ==
- Story: Early Spring, Mid-Summer (Korea Journal 1982), translated by Ji-Moon Suh
- Early Spring, Mid-Summer, translated by So Ju-mun. In: Early Spring, Mid-Summer and Other Korean Short Stories (Pace International Research, edited by Korean National Commission, 1983)
- Hail to the Emperor! (Pace International Research, 1986), translated by Sol Sun-bong
- The Vagabond Guest: My Cousin's Story (Mānoa, University of Hawai'i Press, 1990), translated by Ji-Moon Suh
- An Appointment with My Brother (Jimoondang, 1994), translated by Ji-Moon Suh. Note: a newer translation with a slightly different title was published in 2017.
- The Poet (The Harvill, 1995), translated by Brother Anthony and Chong-Wha Chung
- That Winter of My Youth, translated by Ji-Moon Suh. In: The Rainy Spell and Other Korean Stories (Routledge 1997)
- The Golden Phoenix, also referred to as Garuda (Lynne Rienner Pub March 1, 1999), included in a collection of short novels translated by Suh Ji-moon.
- The Idiot and the Water Snake (Korean Literature Today, 2000), translated by Ji-Moon Suh. Note: volume 5 of the online publication, Korean Literature Today, which includes this translation does not appear to have been archived.
- Our Twisted Hero (Hyperion, 2001), translated by Kevin O'Rourke
- Twofold Song (Hollym International Corp. 2004), bilingual: Korean and English, translated by Kwon Kyong-Mi, illustrated by Kwak Sun-young
- An Anonymous Island (The New Yorker, 2011), translated by Heinz Insu Fenkl
- Pilon's Pig (ASIA Publishers, 2013), bilingual, translated by Jamie Chang
- Winter That Year (Words Without Borders 2014), translated by Brother Anthony from a short story in part 3 of Portrait of Days of Youth
- Son of Man (Dalkey Archive Press, 2015), translated by Brother Anthony)
- The Old Hatter – Short story in You Will Never Return to Your Homeland (Korea Literature Today, 1999, Brother Anthony's web page), translated by Ji-Moon Suh
- Meeting with My Brother (Columbia University Press, 2017), translated by Heinz Insu Fenkl

== See also ==
- Korean literature
- List of Korean novelists
