= The 8 Show =

2024 South Korean television series

- Promotional poster
- Hangul: 더 에이트 쇼
- RR: Deo eiteu syo
- MR: Tŏ eit'ŭ syo
- Genre: Black comedy; Thriller; Satirical drama
- Based on: Money Game & Pie Game by Bae Jin-soo
- Screenplay by: Han Jae-rim
- Directed by: Han Jae-rim
- Starring: Ryu Jun-yeol; Chun Woo-hee; Park Jeong-min; Lee Yul-eum; Park Hae-joon; Lee Joo-young; Moon Jeong-hee; Bae Seong-woo
- Music by: Jung Ji-hoon
- Country of origin: South Korea
- Original language: Korean
- No. of episodes: 8

Production
- Producers: Han Jae-rim; Kwon Mi-kyung; Kim Dae-seung; Son Gi-seon; Lee Bum-hee
- Cinematography: Nam Dong-geun; Lee Ji-hoon
- Editors: Kim Woo-hyun; Kim Ha-na; Han Jae-rim
- Running time: 46–68 minutes
- Production companies: Studio N; Magnum Nine; Lotte Cultureworks
- Budget: ₩24 billion

Original release
- Network: Netflix
- Release: May 17, 2024

The 8 Show (Korean: 더 에이트 쇼) is a 2024 South Korean black comedy thriller television series directed by Han Jae-rim, and starring Ryu Jun-yeol, Chun Woo-hee, Park Jeong-min, Lee Yul-eum, Park Hae-joon, Lee Joo-young, Moon Jeong-hee, and Bae Seong-woo. The screenplay is written by Han based on the Naver webtoons Money Game and Pie Game by Bae Jin-soo, it depicts the story of eight participants continuing to cooperate and antagonize each other in an extreme setting where the game ends when a death occurs in a space where social infrastructure is cut off. It was released on Netflix on May 17, 2024, and received generally positive reviews.

== Plot ==
Eight strangers are offered to participate in a game where they will be locked inside a building and earn a substantial amount of money for each minute the game continues. Each are sequestered at night in a different room on eight separate floors, during which they purchase all of their basic provisions at one hundred times their normal cost using their current prize earnings, while during the day they can use a portion of their remaining time to buy provisions for the group.

Initially, the eight people, opting to only be named based on their floor, work together to try to maximize the remaining game time and individual earnings while living with basic comfort. However, when they discover that the higher floors are earning significantly more money and have larger rooms than the lower floors, a power struggle erupts between the players, while at the same time they try to figure out the unclear means by which more time is added to the game clock.

== Cast ==
- Ryu Jun-yeol as Third Floor / Bae Jin-su
- Chun Woo-hee as Eighth Floor / Song Se-ra
- Park Jeong-min as Seventh Floor / Yoo Phillip
- Lee Yul-eum as Fourth Floor / Kim Yang
- Park Hae-joon as Sixth Floor / Tae-seok
- Lee Joo-young as Second Floor / Chun-ja
- Moon Jeong-hee as Fifth Floor / Moon-jung
- Bae Seong-woo as First Floor / Sang-gook

=== Special appearance ===
- Bae Jin-soo as a film director

== Episodes ==
No.	Directed by	Written by	Original release date
1	Han Jae-rim	Han Jae-rim	May 17, 2024
Jin-su arrives at a mysterious building. When he enters he has an option to play the game or take money and go back home. He decides to stay and chooses a card with three on it. He enters the game room and goes to his room. Once there a door opens and gives him a book with simple rules for the game as well as clothing. He soon sees that he gets ₩30,000 per minute. Items can be bought but at a high rate. In the morning, he meets the other players. They all learn that the higher your room is, the more money you make (Fibonacci sequence). They also learn that Floor 8 received 12 meals and 12 waters which she used to take a bath. They devise a plan to share the food while trying to learn the hidden rules of the game.
2	Han Jae-rim	Han Jae-rim	May 17, 2024
The episode begins showing how Floor 8 came to the game. After learning how to share the food, the team learns from Floor 8 that the stairs are the key to earning more time. After all eight run up and down the stairs, more time is given. They make a plan to divide the work into two teams so four run one day (and get two meals) and the other four rest (and get one meal). Floor 1 is not able to contribute due to his injury, so Floors 2 and 3 steps in for him. When they wake up the next day, they see that the time is almost out. They all run the stairs and Floor 4 has an epileptic seizure. Floor 2 is stopped by Floor 6 from making the call since the time will expire, but Floor 3 is able to make the call. The time jumps to 40 hours. Floor 7 realizes time is added because the fight was entertaining to whoever is watching them.
3	Han Jae-rim	Han Jae-rim	May 17, 2024
Floor 7 is shown entering the game and trying to discover the format and what's happening. After learning the viewers want to be entertained, the group decides to do a talent show. Each act is awarded hours based on the level of entertainment. They also decide that they must know when the group wants to end the game. They let Floor 1 decide since he makes the least and he will stop once he has ₩1 billion – 2 and a half months. After a successful talent show, the group decides that Floor 1 shouldn't keep the waste since they don't run anymore. The group then votes for Floor 8 to have a bathroom for all. But she refuses to comply and retaliates by sending empty food containers and empty water bottles.
4	Han Jae-rim	Han Jae-rim	May 17, 2024
Floor 4 beginning is shown, and she originally chose 8 but changed her mind. Floor 8 withholds all food and water. Floors 3 and 4 eventually offer to hold the waste and Floor 7 apologizes for the group and explains the new set-up. Floor 8 has the group play the King Game. After a vicious fight between Floor 2 and Floor 6, the group decides that someone can disobey the King and the penalty will result in the person being tased. The game is changed where the loser of any pairing had to be tased. Floor 1 realizes the game is being rigged and Floor 7 catches Floor 4 manipulating the balls at night. Floor 8 loses the next day and is about to be tased until Floor 6 intervenes, attacking Floor 7 to stop the penalty and tasing him.
5	Han Jae-rim	Han Jae-rim	May 17, 2024
Floor 7 wakes up in Floor 8's room and agrees to help establish a hierarchy between the upper and lower floors. A new tortuous game is formed with Floors 4, 6, 7, and 8 demanding Floors 1, 2, 3, and 5 play violent games against each other. After playing a violent Hide-and-seek game, Floor 3 is declared the winner and is blindfolded to randomly swing a baseball bat at the losing players. Floor 7 introduces a gamified version of supply distribution to further increase the game's duration, wherein the lower floors are forced to bargain against each other using a shared number of coins to spend on food and water and risking distribution entirely upon failure. After winning a game of twenty Questions, Floor 2 is unsuccessful at launching a comeback against the upper floors with the baseball bat she is given. After several more days of playing, the alliance between the lower floors is tested when they fail to acquire food and water; they attempt to strike but the act is broken by Floor 5 after being offered food, indicating that she's diabetic. Floors 1, 2, and 3 lead a revolt but Floor 6 attacks and overpowers them as Floor 8 stands by with the taser. Floor 7 is revealed to have betrayed the upper floor alliance by sabotaging their taser which allows Floors 1, 2, and 3 to apprehend Floors 6, 8 and 4.
6	Han Jae-rim	Han Jae-rim	May 17, 2024
After subduing Floors 6, 8, and 4, the remaining floors agree to end the game by waiting out the game's clock and dine together in Floor 8's room. With nine hours left, the group retires to their rooms but awaken to find that the clock reset to 36 hours the next morning and discover that someone has been mutilating the tied-up players to add time to the game's clock. Attempting to prevent any further action, Floor 2 locks everyone inside their rooms. The next day Floor 5 hallucinates and believes Floors 4 and 8 were freed from their captivity by Floor 2. Taking advantage of Floor 5's fragile mental state when she goes to check on him, Floor 6 seduces her and convinces her that Floor 2 was responsible for pulling out his toenails, leading to his escape.
7	Han Jae-rim	Han Jae-rim	May 17, 2024
After being set free, Floors 4, 6, and 8 capture the others and begin beating them again. Floor 6 begins to interrogate the captive floors to find out who looks to find out who ripped his toenails, during which Floor 7 is shot in the leg. Floor 3 suggests that they review the CCTV footage. Floor 1 is revealed to be the culprit, admitting as he did so as a means to further prolong the duration of game. Floor 6 goes to kill Floor 1 but is stopped when Floor 8 tases him, causing him to fall down the game room's stairs and leaving him partially paralyzed. Floor 8 ties up Floors 1, 2, 3, and 7 and tortures them with sleep deprivation by tying them to chairs and forcing their eyes open while watching disorienting videos and partially submerging their faces in bowl of water. Floors 4 and 5 are conscripted into keeping them alive. Floor 8 enjoys watching their pain from her room, using it to inspire her art and to masturbate. Floor 1 shares with Floor 4 that they players can change rooms for ₩1 billion, by which he was measuring the time he and the others would remain playing.
8	Han Jae-rim	Han Jae-rim	May 17, 2024
Through a series of flashbacks, the backstory of each other player and their reasons for joining the game is revealed. Floor 1 is a circus performer who entered to afford treatment for his daughter's rare disease; Floor 2 is a laborer who entered to help a coworker suffering from a severe occupational hazard on a negligent worksite; Floor 4 is a menial worker who resents the rich because of her own lack of success; Floor 5 was previously wealthy but fell victim to a romance scam and sued by her ex-husband; Floor 6 is a disgraced former baseball player who now struggles to hold down a job; Floor 7 is a struggling and class conscious scripwriter; Floor 8 is a washed-up performance artist with crushing debt. Floor 4 tells Floors 2, 3, and 7 about the ability to change rooms and they plan their release. The next day, Floor 5 unties everyone. Floor 4 knocks out Floor 8 with a golf club and ties her up. Floor 5 gets revenge on Floor 6 by castrating him. Floor 1 attempts to change rooms by spending the entirety of his money, but only receives instructions and costs to change rooms and subsequently suffers a breakdown. Floor 1, desperate for the game to continue, holds the other players captive and performs a tightrope act. After bouncing high enough to grab a projector in the ceiling, it comes loose and he plummets down into the ensuing flames. Floors 2 and 3 shoot out all the cameras to force the doors open in an attempt to save Floor 1's life, but Floor 1 succumbs to his burns thereby ending the game. After leaving the game room, Floor 3 is informed via letter that the winning money will be wired to his bank account. Floor 3 is traumatized by his experience and deals with depression and thoughts of suicide. Desperate but unsure how to reconnect with the other players, Floor 3 hosts a funeral for Floor 1 and advertises it throughout the city. Floors 2, 4, and 5 attend the service. Floor 3 shares that he met Floor 1's wife and learned that Floor 7 gave her enough money for her lifetime. Floor 6 does not go but sends a huge funerary wreath. Floor 8 was arrested for destroying an art gallery and forced to use all her prize money to pay for the damages. The four leave and go their own way. Floor 7 takes his experience and writes a screenplay about it titled "The 8 Show".

== Production ==
=== Development ===
The series was developed under the working title Money Game (Korean: 머니게임), which was based on Naver Webtoon of the same name and its sequel, Pie Game, both written by Bae Jin-soo. Director Han Jae-rim, who directed The Face Reader (2013) and The King (2017), was looking for his next work after Emergency Declaration (2021) and joined hands with Studio N to direct the series. It was also expected that it would release in an OTT platform. Naver Webtoon announced that Netflix has picked up the franchise under the new title The 8 Show.

Studio N and Magnum Nine managed the production while Lotte Cultureworks served as co-production and investor for the series.

It has a budget with over ₩24 billion invested.

=== Casting ===
In December 2021, Ryu Jun-yeol and Bae Seong-woo were cast as the lead actors of the series. This would be Bae's return to small screen after self-reflecting on his DUI incident in November 2020.

In January 2022, Ryu and Bae along with Lee Ji-eun, Park Jeong-min, and Park Hae-joon has confirmed their appearances for the series. In April 2022, Moon Jeong-hee, Lee Yul-eum, and Lee Joo-young joined the series. In May 2022, Lee Ji-eun left and was replaced by Chun Woo-hee.

=== Filming ===
Principal photography began in May 2022 and ended on December 23, 2022.

== Release ==
Naver Webtoon announced that The 8 Show would be released worldwide on Netflix in 2024. Four months later, Netflix confirmed the release date of the series would be on May 17, 2024.

== Reception ==
=== Critical response ===
On the review aggregator website Rotten Tomatoes, 75% of 8 critics' reviews are positive, with an average rating of 6.8/10. Elisa Guimarães of Collider gave a score of five out of ten and wrote that the series "might garner comparisons to Squid Game", but " struggles with underdeveloped characters and disjointed humor". Kate Sánchez of But Why Tho? gave the series a perfect ten and described it as "one of the best limited series on Netflix" and "it ends with finality and pays off every narrative choice made along the way". Jonathon Wilson of Ready Steady Cut rated it a 2/5 and wrote that "it's fascinating for the wrong reasons". Pierce Conran of South China Morning Post gave a score of three out of five and wrote that "viewers are likely to recognize The 8 Show as a blatant attempt to piggyback on the achievement of the most successful Netflix show of all time, but so long as they are being entertained they may give it more time". Joel Keller of Decider compared the series "as dark as Squid Game, but it's definitely more wryly funny". William Schwartz of HanCinema wrote that it "refuses to caricature even its most seemingly loathsome characters" and "all of them were driven to madness by the harsh, empathy-less world they lived in long before they accepted their invitation to the game".

=== Viewership ===
The 8 Show ranked seventh in Netflix's Global Top 10 TV (Non-English) category after three days of its release and received a warm response in 11 countries being listed in the Top 10. The following week, the series topped the chart with 33.2 million hours watched by 4.8 million viewers, and remained on the chart for the next three consecutive weeks.
