= Blue Dragon Film Award for Best Director =

South Korean film awards

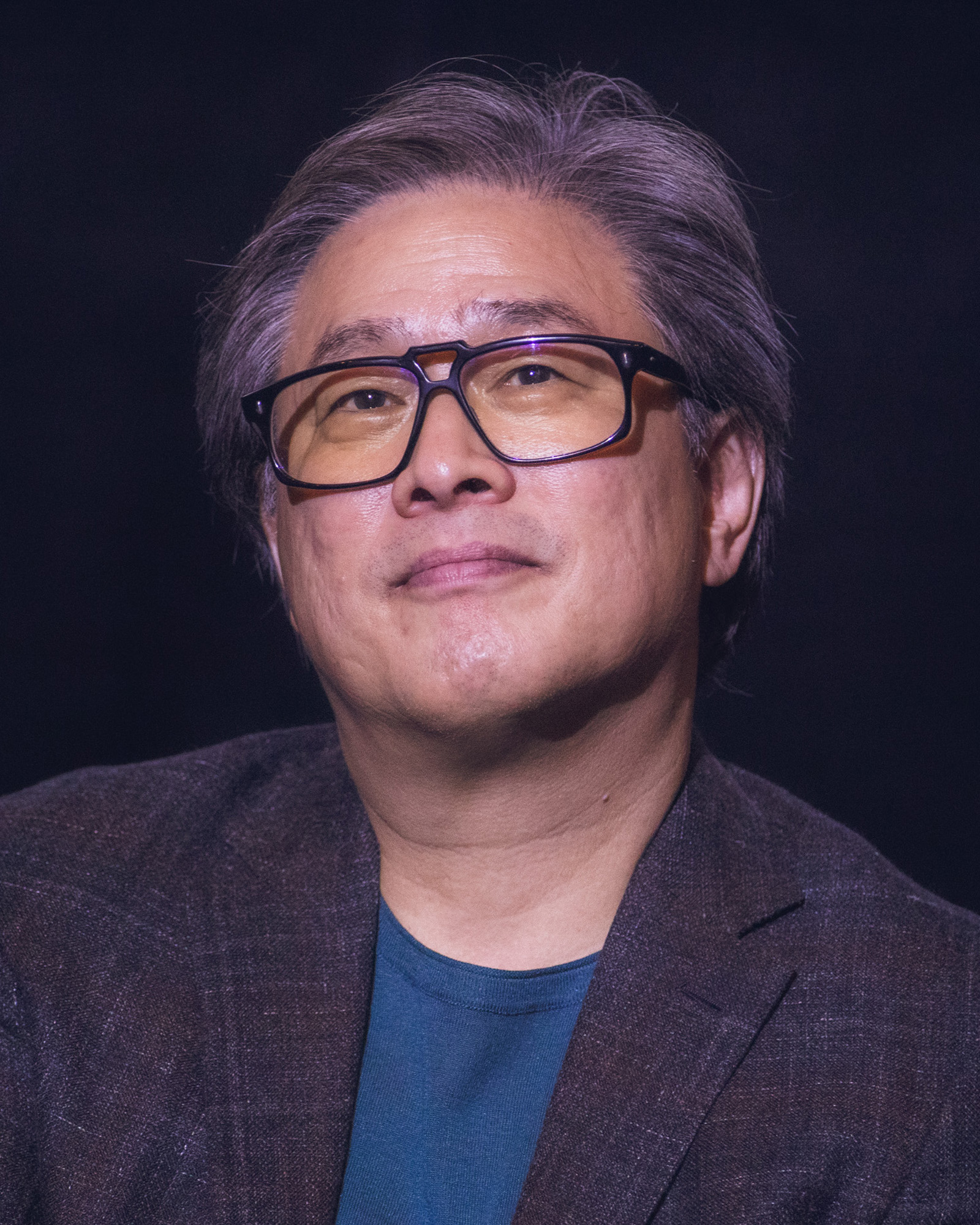
- The 2025 recipient: Park Chan-wook
- Awarded for: Best Director
- Country: South Korea
- Presented by: Blue Dragon Film Awards
- First award: 1963
- Winner: Park Chan-wook – No Other Choice
- Website: www.blueaward.co.kr

The Blue Dragon Film Award for Best Director is one of the awards that is presented annually at the Blue Dragon Film Awards by Sports Chosun, which is typically held at the end of the year.

== Winners and nominees ==
Table key
‡	Indicates the winner

=== 1960s ===
Year	Winner	Film	Original title
1963 (1st)	Lee Man-hee ‡	The Marines Who Never Returned	돌아오지 않는 해병
1964 (2nd)	Yu Hyun-mok ‡	Extra Human Being	잉여인간
1965 (3rd)	Kim Soo-yong ‡	Sad Story of Self Supporting Child	저 하늘에도 슬픔이
1966 (4th)	Lee Man-hee ‡	Market	시장
1967 (5th)	Kim Soo-yong ‡	Children in the Firing Range	사격장의 아이들
1969 (6th)	Yu Hyun-mok ‡	Descendents of Cain	카인의 후예

=== 1970s ===
Year	Winner	Film	Original title
1970 (7th)	Choi Ha-won ‡	The Old Jar Craftsman	독짓는 늙은이
1971 (8th)	Kim Ki-young ‡	When a Woman Breaks Her Jewel Box	옥합을 깨뜨릴 때
1972 (9th)	Kim Hyo-cheon ‡	A Cattle Seller	소장수
1973 (10th)	Jung Jin-woo ‡	Long Live the Island Frogs	섬 개구리 만세

=== 1990s ===
Year	Winner and nominees	Film	Original title
1990 (11th)	Chung Ji-young ‡	Nambugun: North Korean Partisan in South Korea	남부군
1990 (11th)	Park Kwang-su	Black Republic	그들도 우리처럼
1990 (11th)	Park Chul-soo	The Woman Who Walks On Water	물위를 걷는 여자
1990 (11th)	Im Kwon-taek	General's Son	장군의 아들
1990 (11th)	Jang Sun-woo	The Lovers of Woomook-baemi	우묵배미의 사랑
1991 (12th)	Im Kwon-taek ‡	Fly High Run Far	개벽
1991 (12th)	Kwak Ji-kyoon	Portrait of the Days of Youth	젊은날의 초상
1991 (12th)	Kim Ho-sun	Death Song	사의 찬미
1991 (12th)	Park Kwang-su	Berlin Report	베를린리포트
1991 (12th)	Jang Kil-su	Silver Stallion	은마는 오지 않는다
1992 (13th)	Park Jong-won ‡	Our Twisted Hero	우리들의 일그러진 영웅
1992 (13th)	Kang Woo-suk	Mister Mama	미스터 맘마
1992 (13th)	Wan Seonwoo	Blood and Fire	피와 불
1992 (13th)	Jang Sun-woo	The Road to Racetrack	경마장 가는 길
1992 (13th)	Chung Ji-young	White Badge	하얀 전쟁
1993 (14th)	Kim Yoo-jin ‡	Love Is Oh Yeah!	참견은 노, 사랑은 오예
1993 (14th)	Lee Myung-se	First Love	첫사랑
1993 (14th)	Lee Hyun-seung	Blue In You	그대 안의 블루
1993 (14th)	Im Kwon-taek	Sopyonje	서편제
1993 (14th)	Jang Sun-woo	Hwa-Om-Kyung	화엄경
1994 (15th)	Jang Sun-woo ‡	To You from Me	너에게 나를 보낸다
1994 (15th)	Im Kwon-taek	The Taebaek Mountains	태백산맥
1994 (15th)	Kang Woo-suk	Two Cops	투캅스
1994 (15th)	Chung Ji-young	Life and Death of the Hollywood Kid	헐리우드 키드의 생애
1994 (15th)	Jang Hyun-soo	The Rules Of The Game	게임의 법칙
1995 (16th)	Park Kwang-su ‡	A Single Spark	아름다운 청년 전태일
1995 (16th)	Kang Woo-suk	How to Top My Wife	마누라 죽이기
1995 (16th)	Kim Young-bin	The Terrorist	테러리스트
1995 (16th)	Park Chul-soo	301, 302	301-302
1995 (16th)	Oh Byeong-cheol	Go Alone Like Musso's Horn	무소의 뿔처럼 혼자서 가라
1996 (17th)	Im Kwon-taek ‡	Festival	축제
1996 (17th)	Kang Woo-suk	Two Cops 2	투캅스2
1996 (17th)	Park Chul-soo	Farewell My Darling	학생부군신위
1996 (17th)	Lee Myung-se	Their Last Love Affair	지독한 사랑
1996 (17th)	Jang Sun-woo	A Petal	꽃잎
1997 (18th)	Lee Chang-dong ‡	Green Fish	초록물고기
1997 (18th)	Kim Sung-su	Beat	비트
1997 (18th)	Jang Sun-woo	Bad Movie	나쁜 영화
1997 (18th)	Chang Yoon-hyun	The Contact	접속
1997 (18th)	Im Kwon-taek	Downfall	창
1998 (19th)	Hong Sang-soo ‡	The Power of Kangwon Province	강원도의 힘
1998 (19th)	Kang Woo-suk	Bedroom And Courtroom	생과부 위자료 청구 소송
1998 (19th)	Kim Yoo-jin	A Promise	약속
1998 (19th)	E J-yong	An Affair	정사
1998 (19th)	Hur Jin-ho	Christmas in August	8월의 크리스마스
1999 (20th)	Kang Je-gyu ‡	Shiri	쉬리
1999 (20th)	Kim Sang-jin	Attack the Gas Station	주유소 습격사건
1999 (20th)	Park Jong-won	Rainbow Trout	송어
1999 (20th)	Lee Myung-se	Nowhere to Hide	인정사정 볼 것 없다
1999 (20th)	Chang Yoon-hyun	Tell Me Something	텔 미 썸딩

=== 2000s ===
Year	Winner and nominees	Film	Original title
2000 (21st)	Park Chan-wook ‡	Joint Security Area	공동경비구역 JSA
2000 (21st)	Kim Jee-woon	The Foul King	반칙왕
2000 (21st)	Lee Chang-dong	Peppermint Candy	박하사탕
2000 (21st)	Im Kwon-taek	Chunhyang	춘향뎐
2000 (21st)	Hong Sang-soo	Virgin Stripped Bare by Her Bachelors	오! 수정
2001 (22nd)	Song Hae-sung ‡	Failan	파이란
2001 (22nd)	Kwak Kyung-taek	Friend	친구
2001 (22nd)	Kim Sung-su	Musa	무사
2001 (22nd)	Jang Jin	Guns & Talks	킬러들의 수다
2001 (22nd)	Hur Jin-ho	One Fine Spring Day	봄날은 간다
2002 (23rd)	Im Kwon-taek ‡	Chi-hwa-seon	취화선
2002 (23rd)	Kang Woo-suk	Public Enemy	공공의 적
2002 (23rd)	Kim Sang-jin	Jail Breakers	광복절 특사
2002 (23rd)	Park Chan-wook	Sympathy for Mr. Vengeance	복수는 나의 것
2002 (23rd)	Lee Jeong-hyang	The Way Home	집으로...
2003 (24th)	Park Chan-wook ‡	Oldboy	올드보이
2003 (24th)	Kwak Jae-yong	The Classic	클래식
2003 (24th)	Bong Joon-ho	Memories of Murder	살인의 추억
2003 (24th)	E J-yong	Untold Scandal	스캔들 - 조선남녀상열지사
2003 (24th)	Im Sang-soo	A Good Lawyer's Wife	바람난 가족
2004 (25th)	Kang Woo-suk ‡	Silmido	실미도
2004 (25th)	Kang Je-gyu	Taegukgi	태극기 휘날리며
2004 (25th)	Kim Ki-duk	3-Iron	빈 집
2004 (25th)	Park Heung-sik	My Mother, the Mermaid	인어 공주
2004 (25th)	Yoo Ha	Once Upon a Time in High School	말죽거리 잔혹사
2005 (26th)	Park Jin-pyo ‡	You Are My Sunshine	너는 내 운명
2005 (26th)	Im Sang-soo	The President's Last Bang	그때 그사람들
2005 (26th)	Kim Dae-seung	Blood Rain	혈의 누
2005 (26th)	Kim Jee-woon	A Bittersweet Life	달콤한 인생
2005 (26th)	Park Chan-wook	Sympathy for Lady Vengeance	친절한 금자씨
2006 (27th)	Kim Tae-yong ‡	Family Ties	가족의 탄생
2006 (27th)	Bong Joon-ho	The Host	괴물
2006 (27th)	Choi Dong-hoon	Tazza: The High Rollers	타짜
2006 (27th)	Lee Joon-ik	The King and the Clown	왕의 남자
2006 (27th)	Yoo Ha	A Dirty Carnival	비열한 거리
2007 (28th)	Hur Jin-ho ‡	Happiness	행복
2007 (28th)	Han Jae-rim	The Show Must Go On	우아한 세계
2007 (28th)	Kim Ji-hoon	May 18	화려한 휴가
2007 (28th)	Kim Yong-hwa	200 Pounds Beauty	미녀는 괴로워
2007 (28th)	Park Jin-pyo	Voice of a Murderer	그놈 목소리
2008 (29th)	Kim Jee-woon ‡	The Good, the Bad, the Weird	좋은 놈, 나쁜 놈, 이상한 놈
2008 (29th)	Kim Tae-kyun	Crossing	크로싱
2008 (29th)	Kim Yoo-jin	The Divine Weapon	신기전
2008 (29th)	Won Shin-yun	Seven Days	세븐 데이즈
2008 (29th)	Yim Soon-rye	Forever the Moment	우리 생애 최고의 순간
2009 (30th)	Kim Yong-hwa ‡	Take Off	국가대표
2009 (30th)	Bong Joon-ho	Mother	마더
2009 (30th)	Jang Jin	Good Morning President	굿모닝 프레지던트
2009 (30th)	Park Chan-wook	Thirst	박쥐
2009 (30th)	Yoon Je-kyoon	Tidal Wave	해운대

=== 2010s ===
Year	Winner and nominees	Film	Original title
2010 (31st)	Kang Woo-suk ‡	Moss	이끼
2010 (31st)	Choi Dong-hoon	Jeon Woo-chi: The Taoist Wizard	전우치
2010 (31st)	Im Sang-soo	The Housemaid	하녀
2010 (31st)	Jang Hoon	Secret Reunion	의형제
2010 (31st)	Lee Jeong-beom	The Man from Nowhere	아저씨
2011 (32nd)	Ryoo Seung-wan ‡	The Unjust	부당거래
2011 (32nd)	Hwang Dong-hyuk	Silenced	도가니
2011 (32nd)	Jang Hoon	The Front Line	고지전
2011 (32nd)	Kang Hyeong-cheol	Sunny	써니
2011 (32nd)	Kim Han-min	War of the Arrows	최종병기 활
2012 (33rd)	Chung Ji-young ‡	Unbowed	부러진 화살
2012 (33rd)	Choi Dong-hoon	The Thieves	도둑들
2012 (33rd)	Choo Chang-min	Masquerade	광해, 왕이 된 남자
2012 (33rd)	Kim Ki-duk	Pietà	피에타
2012 (33rd)	Yoon Jong-bin	Nameless Gangster: Rules of the Time	범죄와의 전쟁 : 나쁜놈들 전성시대
2013 (34th)	Bong Joon-ho ‡	Snowpiercer	설국열차
2013 (34th)	Han Jae-rim	The Face Reader	관상
2013 (34th)	Lee Joon-ik	Hope	소원
2013 (34th)	Park Hoon-jung	New World	신세계
2013 (34th)	Ryoo Seung-wan	The Berlin File	베를린
2014 (35th)	Kim Han-min	The Admiral: Roaring Currents	명량
2014 (35th)	Hwang Dong-hyuk	Miss Granny	수상한 그녀
2014 (35th)	Kim Seong-hun	A Hard Day	끝까지 간다
2014 (35th)	Lee Seok-hoon	The Pirates	해적: 바다로 간 산적
2014 (35th)	Yim Soon-rye	Whistle Blower	제보자
2015 (36th)	Ryoo Seung-wan ‡	Veteran	베테랑
2015 (36th)	Choi Dong-hoon	Assassination	암살
2015 (36th)	Kwak Kyung-taek	The Classified File	극비수사
2015 (36th)	Lee Joon-ik	The Throne	사도
2015 (36th)	Yoon Je-kyoon	Ode to My Father	국제시장
2016 (37th)	Na Hong-jin ‡	The Wailing	곡성
2016 (37th)	Kim Jee-woon	The Age of Shadows	밀정
2016 (37th)	Lee Joon-ik	Dongju: The Portrait of a Poet	동주
2016 (37th)	Park Chan-wook	The Handmaiden	아가씨
2016 (37th)	Woo Min-ho	Inside Men	내부자들
2017 (38th)	Kim Hyun-seok ‡	I Can Speak	아이 캔 스피크
2017 (38th)	Byun Sung-hyun	The Merciless	불한당: 나쁜 놈들의 세상
2017 (38th)	Hwang Dong-hyuk	The Fortress	남한산성
2017 (38th)	Jang Hoon	A Taxi Driver	택시 운전사
2017 (38th)	Lee Joon-ik	Anarchist from Colony	박열
2018 (39th)	Yoon Jong-bin ‡	The Spy Gone North	공작
2018 (39th)	Jang Joon-hwan	1987: When the Day Comes	1987
2018 (39th)	Kim Yong-hwa	Along with the Gods: The Two Worlds	신과함께-죄와 벌
2018 (39th)	Min Kyu-dong	Herstory	허스토리
2018 (39th)	Yim Soon-rye	Little Forest	리틀 포레스트
2019 (40th)	Bong Joon-ho ‡	Parasite	기생충
2019 (40th)	Kang Hyeong-cheol	Swing Kids	스윙키즈
2019 (40th)	Won Shin-yun	The Battle: Roar to Victory	봉오동 전투
2019 (40th)	Lee Byeong-heon	Extreme Job	극한직업
2019 (40th)	Jang Jae-hyun	Svaha: The Sixth Finger	사바하

=== 2020s ===
Year	Winner and nominees	Film	Original title
2020 (41st)	Lim Dae-hyung ‡	Moonlit Winter	윤희에게
2020 (41st)	Yeon Sang-ho	Peninsula	반도
2020 (41st)	Yang Woo-suk	Steel Rain 2: Summit	강철비2: 정상회담
2020 (41st)	Woo Min-ho	The Man Standing Next	남산의 부장들
2020 (41st)	Hong Won-chan	Deliver Us from Evil	다만 악에서 구하소서
2021 (42nd)
2021 (42nd)	Ryoo Seung-wan‡	Escape from Mogadishu	모가디슈
2021 (42nd)	Lee Jun-ik	The Book of Fish	자산어보
2021 (42nd)	Park Hoon-jung	Night in Paradise	낙원의 밤
2021 (42nd)	Lee Seung-won	Three Sisters	세 자매
2021 (42nd)	Jo Sung-hee	Space Sweepers	승리호
2022 (43rd)
2022 (43rd)	Park Chan-wook‡	Decision to Leave	헤어질 결심
2022 (43rd)	Byun Sung-hyun	Kingmaker	킹메이커
2022 (43rd)	Kim Han-min	Hansan: Rising Dragon	한산: 용의 출현
2022 (43rd)	Han Jae-rim	Emergency Declaration	비상선언
2022 (43rd)	Hirokazu Kore-eda	Broker	브로커
2023 (44th)
2023 (44th)	Um Tae-hwa‡	Concrete Utopia	콘크리트 유토피아
2023 (44th)	Kim Jee-woon	Cobweb	거미집
2023 (44th)	Ryoo Seung-wan	Smugglers	밀수
2023 (44th)	Lee Han	Honey Sweet	달짝지근해: 7510
2023 (44th)	Jung Ju-ri	Next Sohee	다음 소희
2024 (45th)
2024 (45th)	Jang Jae-hyun‡	Exhuma	파묘
2024 (45th)	Kim Sung-su	12.12: The Day	서울의 봄
2024 (45th)	Kim Tae-yong	Wonderland	원더랜드
2024 (45th)	Ryoo Seung-wan	I, the Executioner	베테랑2
2024 (45th)	Lee Jong-pil	Escape	탈주
2025 (46th)
2025 (46th)	Park Chan-wook‡	No Other Choice	어쩔수가없다
2025 (46th)	Min Kyu-dong	The Old Woman with the Knife	파과
2025 (46th)	Yeon Sang-ho	The Ugly	얼굴
2025 (46th)	Woo Min-ho	Harbin	하얼빈
2025 (46th)	Pil Gam-sung	My Daughter Is a Zombie	좀비딸

== See also ==
- Academy Award for Best Director
- Asian Film Award for Best Director
- BAFTA Award for Best Direction
- Cannes Film Festival Award for Best Director
- César Award for Best Director
- European Film Award for Best Director
- Golden Horse Award for Best Director
- Goya Award for Best Director
- Hong Kong Film Award for Best Director
- Silver Lion

== General references ==
- "Winners and nominees lists". Blue Dragon Film Awards (in Korean). Archived from the original on 27 January 2022.
- "Blue Dragon Film Awards". Naver (in Korean).
