= Han Jae-rim =

South Korean film director (born 1975)

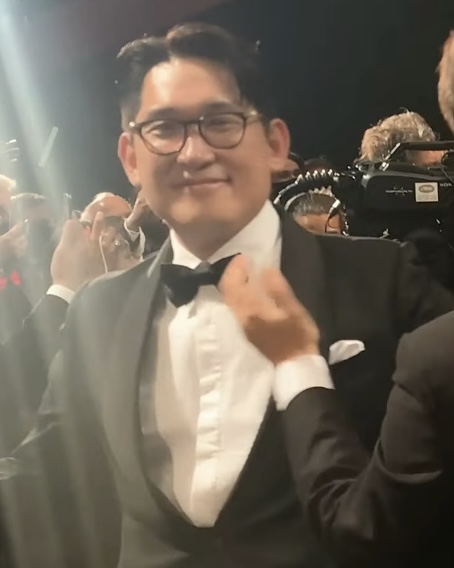
- Han at the 2022 Cannes Film Festival
- Born: July 14, 1975 (age 51); Jeju Province, South Korea
- Education: Seoul Institute of the Arts
- Occupations: Film director, screenwriter, producer
- Years active: 2003–present
- Employer(s): Magnum Nine Co., Ltd.

Korean name
- Hangul: 한재림
- Hanja: 韓在林
- RR: Han Jaerim
- MR: Han Chaerim

Han Jae-rim (Korean: 한재림; born July 14, 1975) is a South Korean film director, screenwriter, and producer. His film Emergency Declaration (2021) was an official selection at the 74th Cannes Film Festival, where it screened out of competition. Han is also known for directing the films Rules of Dating (2005), The Show Must Go On (2007), The Face Reader (2013), The King (2017), as well as Netflix Original Series The 8 Show (2024). His work spans various genres, from political thrillers to period dramas.

== Early life and education ==
Han Jae-rim was born on July 14, 1975, in Jeju Province. He attended Jeju National University of Education High School and later studied English Literature at Jeju National University before switching to film directing at Seoul Institute of the Arts. He graduated from Seoul Institute of the Arts in 1998.

== Career ==
=== 2003 to 2009: Beginnings ===
Han started his filmmaking career in 2003 as an assistant director and script editor for Min Byung-chun's film Natural City. In the same year, he and Go Yoon-hee teamed up for the Korean Film Council (KOFIC) Screenplay Contest. Their script titled To Do or Not to Do was selected as runner-up for Best Screenplay. The script was later adapted into his directorial debut film Rules of Dating in 2005. Featuring sexually frank dialogue between teacher colleagues played by Park Hae-il and Kang Hye-jung, the film explored controversial gender politics, sexual harassment and moral relativism in a cynical and unsettling take on the romantic comedy. Rules of Dating drew critical praise and became a sleeper hit with 1.6 million admissions. Han won Best Screenplay at the Blue Dragon Film Awards, along with Best New Director at the Busan Film Critics Awards and the Grand Bell Awards.

Han, Kim Jee-woon and Yim Pil-sung then signed on to each shoot a short film for the omnibus Doomsday Book in 2006. Han's segment "The Christmas Gift" was supposed to have been a science-fiction musical retelling of O. Henry's The Gift of the Magi, but it was never shot after financing fell through. The film was later released in 2012, but without Han's involvement (Kim and Yim co-directed the third short with a completely new script).

In 2007, he wrote and directed his second film, The Show Must Go On. Starring Korea's top actor Song Kang-ho as a mid-level gangster dealing with family and work troubles, Han injected off-kilter comedy and pathos into the Korean film noir genre. The Show Must Go On won Best Film at the 28th Blue Dragon Film Awards and the Korean Association of Film Critics Awards.

Han entered pre-production for his purported third film, Trace in 2009. Based on the webtoon of the same title, it follows a young man who wakes up from a coma with superpowers after an assault that took his father's life. But despite winning the Kodak Award (with a cash prize of US$17,000) at the Busan International Film Festival's Pusan Promotion Plan, Han was unable to secure financing for the US$7.7 million blockbuster, and the project was shelved.

=== 2010 to 2018: Wooju Film ===
In 2010, Han established a film production company Wooju Film Co., Ltd. Six years after his last completed film, Han returned to the big screen in 2013 with the period drama The Face Reader. The film delved into the philosophical question whether character determines fate or vice versa, through a story about a Joseon fortuneteller skilled in physiognomy who becomes swept up in court intrigues and power struggles. Again starring Song Kang-ho as the titular character opposite Lee Jung-jae as the ambitious Grand Prince Suyang, The Face Reader scored 9.1 million admissions at the local box office, making it the 13th highest grossing Korean film of all time. In 2013, It won six trophies at the 50th Grand Bell Awards, including Best Film and Best Director for Han.

Han also produced Roh Deok's films Very Ordinary Couple (2013) and The Exclusive: Beat the Devil's Tattoo (2015).

According to an interview in Cine21 (2024), Han wrote the scenario of the movie The King (2017) in just one month. He was preparing for a martial arts film that wasn't going well, so he wrote this story and it came out quickly. The previous investor wanted him to do a martial arts film, but Han decided to write a unique story that he thought would be easier to produce with a distinctive cast. He considered actor Zo In-sung for the lead role, despite initial doubts about his willingness to take on a risky role. However, after meeting Zo, who expressed a genuine desire to have fun with the project without any strategic calculations, Han was impressed by his flexibility and commitment on set. Collaborating with Zo helped Han overcome his prejudice towards good-looking actors.

=== 2019 to present: Magnum Nine ===
In 2019, Han changed his company name to Magnum Nine Co., Ltd., inspired by the photojournalism group Magnum, founded by Henri Cartier-Bresson and Robert Capa. Han admired their spirit of documenting the world. Magnum's first project was co-produced with Showbox, the disaster film Emergency Declaration. Han reunited with Song Kang-ho for the third time and Kim So-jin for the second time, while also working for the first time with Lee Byung-hun, Jeon Do-yeon, Kim Nam-gil, Yim Si-wan, and Park Hae-joon. Filming resumed on September 12, 2020, after being postponed due to a resurgence of COVID-19 in August 2020, and wrapped on October 24, 2020. The film premiered out of competition at the 74th Cannes Film Festival on July 16, 2021, before its theatrical release in South Korea on August 3, 2022. It was screened in various formats, including on 4DX, ScreenX, and IMAX.

Han made his streaming series directorial and scriptwriting debut with Netflix's The 8 Show, a black comedy thriller adapted from Bae Jin-soo's Naver webtoons Money Game and Pie Game. The series, which had a budget of over ₩24 billion and was co-produced by Studio N, Magnum Nine, and Lotte Cultureworks, plunges eight participants into an isolated environment where they must navigate cooperation and antagonism, with the game ending upon a death. For this project, Han reunited with frequent collaborators such as Lee Yul-eum, Ryu Jun-yeol, Bae Seong-woo, and Park Hae-joon, while also working for the first time with Chun Woo-hee, Park Jeong-min, Moon Jeong-hee, and Lee Joo-young. The 8 Show was released on Netflix on May 17, 2024, and received generally positive reviews.

In June 2021, Showbox announced plans to produce a drama based on Hongjacga's popular Naver webtoon, Delusion. By September of that year, Han already started working on the series. It is a mystery horror period drama set in 1935 Gyeongseong and 1800s Shanghai, revolving around a mysterious vampire. The estimated production cost is said to be ₩45 billion. On May 23, 2025, Disney+ confirmed it would release Portraits of Delusion as an original series in 2026, starring Bae Suzy and Kim Seon-ho.

== Personal life ==
On August 21, 2023, dating rumors involving actress Lee Yul-eum emerged. A year later, they denied these rumors during a press conference for the drama The 8 Show.

== Recurring cast ==
Recurring casts in Han's works
| Actor Work | Bae Seong-woo | Kim So-jin | Lee Yul-eum | Park Hae-joon | Ryu Jun-yeol | Song Kang-ho |
|---|---|---|---|---|---|---|
| Rules of Dating | | | | | | |
| The Show Must Go On | | | | | | check |
| The Face Reader | | | | | | check |
| The King | check | check | | | check | |
| Emergency Declaration | | check | check | check | | check |
| The 8 Show | check | | check | check | check | |

== Filmography ==
=== Film ===
| Year | Title | | Credited as | | | Ref. |
| Year | English | Korean | Director | Writer | Producer | Ref. |
|---|---|---|---|---|---|---|
| 2003 | Natural City | 내츄럴 시티 | Assistant | Script editor | No | |
| 2005 | Rules of Dating | 연애의 목적 | Yes | Script editor | No | |
| 2007 | The Show Must Go On | 우아한 세계 | Yes | Yes | No | |
| 2013 | Very Ordinary Couple | 연애의 온도 | No | No | Yes | |
| 2013 | The Face Reader | 관상 | Yes | Script editor | No | |
| 2015 | The Exclusive: Beat the Devil's Tattoo | 특종: 량첸살인기 | No | No | Yes | |
| 2017 | The King | 더킹 | Yes | Yes | Yes | |
| 2021 | Emergency Declaration | 비상선언 | Yes | Yes | Yes | |

=== Television series ===
Key
| † | Denotes television productions that have not yet been released |

| Year | Title | | Credited as | | | Ref. |
| Year | English | Korean | Director | Writer | Producer | Ref. |
|---|---|---|---|---|---|---|
| 2024 | The 8 Show | 머니게임 | Yes | Yes | Yes | |
| 2026 | Portraits of Delusion † | 현혹 | Yes | Yes | No | |
| TBA | Exorcism † | 퇴마록 | Yes | Yes | No | |

=== Television commercial ===
| Year | Title | | Credited as | | | Ref. |
| Year | English | Korean | Director | Writer | Producer | Ref. |
|---|---|---|---|---|---|---|
| 2018 | 70th anniversary of the Jeju 4.3 Incident | 4.3사건 70주년 | Yes | Yes | Yes | |

== Awards and nominations ==
Awards and nominations received by Han
| Award | Year | Category | Recipient | Result | Ref. |
|---|---|---|---|---|---|
| 50th Baeksang Arts Awards | 2014 | Best Film | The Face Reader | Nominated | |
| 6th Busan Film Critics Association Awards | 2005 | Best Film | Rules of Dating | Won | |
| 6th Busan Film Critics Association Awards | 2005 | Best New Director | Rules of Dating | Won | |
| 26th Blue Dragon Film Awards | 2006 | Best Screenplay | Rules of Dating | Won | |
| 26th Blue Dragon Film Awards | 2006 | Best New Director | Rules of Dating | Nominated | |
| 28th Blue Dragon Film Awards | 2008 | Best Film | The Show Must Go On | Won | |
| 34th Blue Dragon Film Awards | 2013 | Best Film | The Face Reader | Nominated | |
| 34th Blue Dragon Film Awards | 2013 | Best Director | The Face Reader | Nominated | |
| 38th Blue Dragon Film Awards | 2017 | Best Film | The King | Nominated | |
| 43rd Blue Dragon Film Awards | 2022 | Best Director | Emergency Declaration | Nominated | |
| Buil Film Awards | 2022 | Best Film | Emergency Declaration | Nominated | |
| 19th Chunsa Film Art Awards | 2014 | Best Director | The Face Reader | Nominated | |
| 17th Director's Cut Awards | 2017 | Special Mention of the Year | The King | Won | |
| 11th Fantasia Film Festival | 2007 | Screenplay Award | The Show Must Go On | Won | |
| 43rd Grand Bell Awards | 2006 | Best New Director | Rules of Dating | Won | |
| 50th Grand Bell Awards | 2013 | Best Film | The Face Reader | Won | |
| 50th Grand Bell Awards | 2013 | Best Director | The Face Reader | Won | |
| 54th Grand Bell Awards | 2017 | Best Film | The King | Nominated | |
| 54th Grand Bell Awards | 2017 | Best Director | The King | Nominated | |
| 54th Grand Bell Awards | 2017 | Best Screenplay | The King | Won | |
| Kodak Award at the 12th Busan Promotion Plan (PPP) | 2009 | Film support | Trace | Won | |
| Korean Film Awards | 2006 | Best New Director | Rules of Dating | Nominated | |
| 27th Korean Film Critics Association Awards | 2007 | Best Picture Award | The Show Must Go On | Won | |
| Korean Association of Film Critics Awards | 2022 | Korean Association of Film 10 selections of Kim Hyun-seung | Emergency Declaration | Won | |
| Korean Film Council (KOFIC) Screenplay Contest | 2003 | Excellence Award | To Do or Not to Do (Note: Co-written with Go Yoon-hee, the film was retitled "Rules of Dating" when it was made.) | Won | |
| 9th Max Movie Awards | 2014 | Best Poster | The Face Reader | Won | |
| 9th Max Movie Awards | 2014 | Best Preview | The Face Reader | Nominated | |
| 1st The Seoul Awards | 2017 | Best Film | The King | Nominated | |
| Tokyo International Film Festival | 2005 | Tokyo Grand Prix | Rules of Dating | Nominated | |

== See also ==
- List of Korean film directors
- Cinema of Korea
