= Park Hae-joon =

South Korean actor (born 1976)

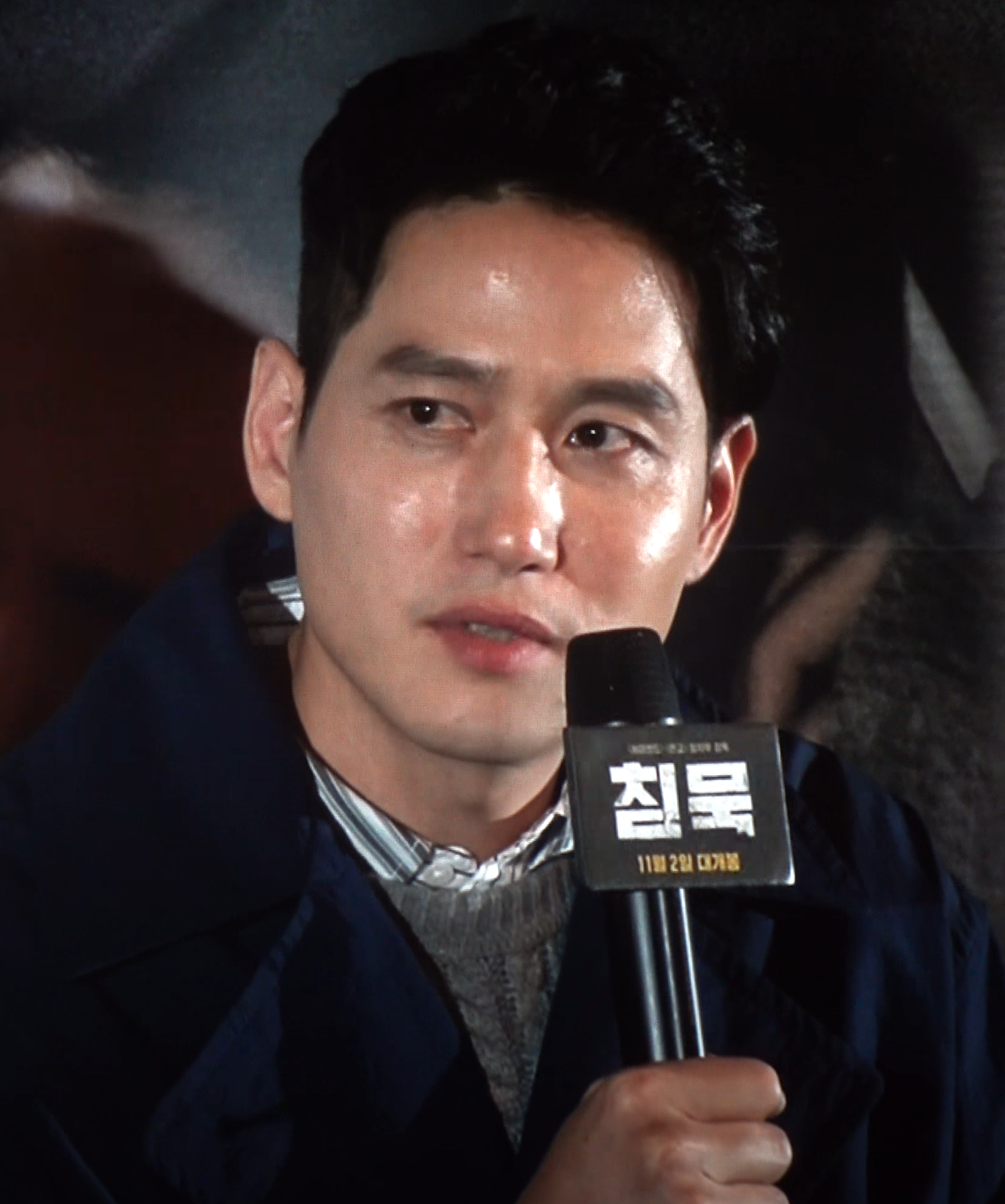
- Park in October 2017
- Born: Park Sang-woo; June 14, 1976 (age 50); Busan, South Korea
- Education: Korea National University of Arts
- Occupation: Actor
- Years active: 2000–present
- Agent: Pleo Entertainment
- Spouse: Oh Yu-jin (m. 2011)
- Children: 2

Korean name
- Hangul: 박상우
- RR: Bak Sangu
- MR: Pak Sangu

Stage name
- Hangul: 박해준
- RR: Bak Haejun
- MR: Pak Haejun

Park Sang-woo (Korean: 박상우; born on June 14, 1976), better known by his stage name, Park Hae-joon (Korean: 박해준), is a South Korean actor. He is internationally recognized for his starring roles in the dramas The World of the Married (2020), The 8 Show (2024), and When Life Gives You Tangerines (2025). Park started his career in 2005 as a stage actor in Daehangno, later joining the Chaimu theater company in 2010. After making his film debut in 2012, he gained recognition for his role in the independent film 4th Place (2015), earning Best New Actor and Best Actor nominations he Buil Film Awards and Wildflower Film Awards, respectively.

Park received further acclaim with a Best Supporting Actor nomination for his performance in Believer (2018) at both the Baeksang Arts Awards and the Buil Film Awards. For his role in Kim Sung-su's film 12.12: The Day (2023), he was nominated for Best Supporting Actor at the Blue Dragon Film Awards and was inducted into the "Chungmuro 10 Million Viewers Club," a recognition given to actors whose films have sold more than 10 million tickets in South Korea.

== Early life and education ==
Park was born on June 14, 1976, in Busan, South Korea. Initially wanting to become a singer, he became interested in acting during high school and, encouraged by his aunt, applied to the Department of Theater and Film. He was admitted to the second cohort of the Theatre Department at the Korea National University of Arts.

Since enrolling in university, Park gained attention for his height and appearance, earning the nicknames "Korea National University of Arts legend" and "second-generation Jang Dong-gun," as Jang was also an alumnus of the same school from the first cohort. Despite these praise, Park expressed that his appearance became a personal insecurity and sometimes affected audience perceptions of his acting.

Park initially struggled to adjust to the college's atmosphere and practical teaching methods. Entering with less preparation than his peers, he often felt inadequate. He frequently missed classes, leading to academic warnings and ultimately withdrawing on the advice of a professor. After completing his mandatory military service, he retook the entrance exam in 2000 and re-enrolled to continue his studies in acting.

During his studies, He participated in various theater productions, often taking minor roles in small theaters in Daehak-ro. His involvement in stage set assembly, as well as lighting and acoustic rehearsals, enhanced his physical endurance and deepened his appreciation for the importance of the stage in acting. He also occasionally appeared as an extra in films.

== Career ==
=== 2000–2011: Beginnings ===
After graduating from the Korea National University of Arts, Park made his debut in the play Agamemnon at the Seoul Arts Center in 2005. In 2006, he acted in play Forget That Time, which was directed by Lee Jong-seong and starring Oh Yu-jin, produced by Theater Company Chaimu. The following year, he moved to Daehak-ro and appeared in At That Time, Stars Were Falling, adapted and directed by Min Bok-ki from John Cariani's Almost, Maine, also produced by Theater Company Chaimu.

Facing challenges securing roles, he formed a theater troupe with friends in a rented practice space in Hongeun-dong, Seoul. Acknowledging his initial struggles with acting, he shifted focus toward experimental performances to explore creative plays, producing numerous works driven by passion. Supported by a grant, Park and a small group of collaborators experimented with diverse performance styles. One notable production was the cabaret play Monster (2009). Financial difficulties led to the theater company's closure after about three years.

In 2010, Park reconnected with his former college professor, director Yi Sang-woo, and joined his Theater Company Chaimu. Yi organized a performance of John Cariani's play Almost, Maine, in which Park participated. During this production, Yi praised Park on his development as an actor since their university days and advised him to embrace his awkward and clumsy traits. Under Yi's guidance, Park learned to engage more directly with audiences, a skill he found invaluable, as his earlier performances had created a distance between the stage and the audience. Working with Yi played a significant role in boosting Park's confidence as an actor.

=== 2012–2019: Breakthrough ===
Park's film debut was in Helpless in 2012, a psychological thriller written and directed by Byun Young-joo, based on the novel All She Was Worth (火車) by Japanese author Miyabe Miyuki. He played the role of a ruthless loan shark. One memorable scene, shot in a single take, showed Kim Min-hee slapping him. Park mentioned the pressure to get the scene right, calling it a pivotal moment in his career. He later adopted the stage name Park Hae-joon and began his television career with the KBS 2TV drama Jeon Woo-chi, portraying Dae-geun, a street thug involved in a conspiracy against the titular character.

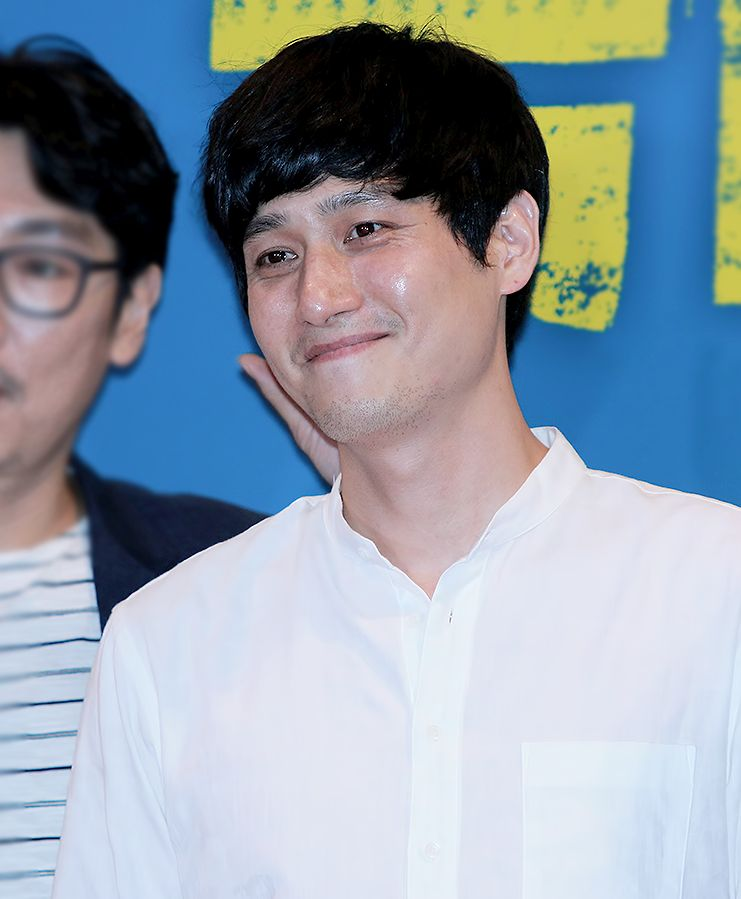
Park in June 2015

In 2013, Park starred in Hwayi: A Monster Boy alongside Yeo Jin-goo and a veteran cast of Chungmuro actors including Kim Yoon-seok, Jo Jin-woong, Kim Sung-kyun, and Jang Hyun-seong. Park's casting was influenced by his performance in Helpless, which impressed the CEO of the production company and director Jang Joon-hwan. In the film, he portrayed Beom-su, one of Hwa-yi's adopted fathers, a sniper with minimal dialogue but effectively building tension in the scenes.

In 2014, Park starred in the drama Doctor Stranger as Cha Jin-soo, a North Korean agent. He later gained more fame for his role in the tvN drama Misaeng: Incomplete Life as Manager Cheon Gwan-woong, a character that office workers could relate to. This role marked his first project with director Kim Won-seok.

In 2015, he appeared as a guest in the drama The Missing. He also took on his first leading role in Jung Ji-woo's independent film 4th Place. Park played a coach who, after quitting swimming due to corporal punishment, perpetuates the cycle of violence with his student. This project expanded his acting range and earned him nominations for Best New Actor at the 25th Buil Film Awards and Best Actor at the 4th Wildflower Film Awards. On October 29, 2015, Park attended a press conference at the Daehakro Arts Theater 2 in Seoul to celebrate the 20th anniversary of the theater group Chaimu. In December 2015, he participated in the 4th Chaimu's 20th anniversary play One Fine Day directed by Min Bok-ki, where he played the role of Jeong-hoon.

In 2018, Park collaborated with Kim Won-seok for the second time in the drama My Mister, where he played Gyeom-deok, who left his lover Jeong-hee, portrayed by Oh Na-ra, to be a Buddhist monk. Park's portrayal of the morally ambiguous character was well received. The same year, he starred in the crime action film Believer for which he received Best Supporting Actor nominations at the 27th Buil Film Awards and the 55th Baeksang Arts Awards.

In 2019, Park collaborated with Kim Won-seok for the third time in the drama Arthdal Chronicles, playing the role of Moo-baek, a skilled Daekan warrior (swordsman) known for his exceptional abilities and his kindness and compassion. Park also appeared in four movies that year: Jo Pil-ho: The Dawning Rage, Tune in for Love, Cheer Up, Mr. Lee, and Bring Me Home. His performances once again highlighted his acting versatility in film and television. He also reprised his role as BJ Ka-jun in Theater Company Chaimu's musical Moonlight Fairy and the Girl.

=== 2020–2024: Mainstream success and critical acclaim ===
In 2020, Park starred in the JTBC drama The World of the Married. The series finale achieved a nationwide rating of 28.371%, making it the highest-rated drama in Korean cable television history at the time of airing. His performance earned him the nickname "Nation's Cheater" from the media. Park initially declined the role, citing concerns regarding his ability to portray the character effectively and the limited time available for preparation. He also noted a conflict between the character's actions and his own moral values as a family man. However, he eventually accepted the role after director Byun Young-joo encouraged him to take the opportunity to work alongside actress Kim Hee-ae.

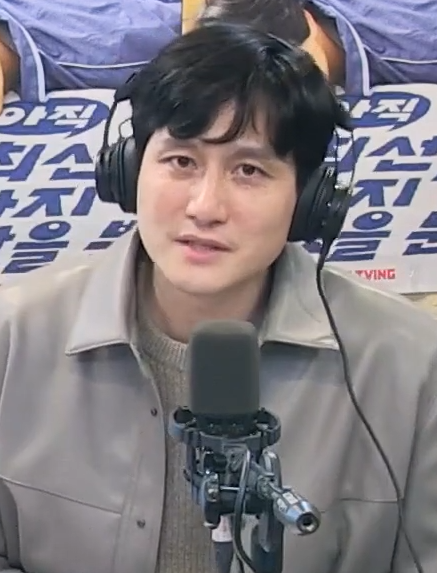
Park in March 2022

The following year, Park appeared as homicide detective Kim Ho-tae in the Netflix horror-thriller The 8th Night (2021). He also portrayed Park Tae-su in Han Jae-rim's disaster film Emergency Declaration which screened out of competition section at both the 74th Cannes Film Festival as and the 55th Sitges Film Festival. In 2022, he starred in TVING's I Have Not Done My Best Yet, portraying an unemployed father of two.

Park returned to cinema in 2023 with Kim Sung-su's 12.12: The Day, starring alongside Hwang Jung-min, Jung Woo-sung, Lee Sung-min, and Kim Sung-kyun. Released on November 22, the film is set during the 1979 South Korean coup d'état. Park playing the role of Major General Roh Tae-gun, based on Roh Tae-woo. The production was a massive success, grossing $97 million against a $17 million budget to become the highest-grossing Korean film of 2023 and the fourth-highest-grossing Korean film of all time. This performance earned Park a Best Supporting Actor nomination at the Blue Dragon Film Awards and induction into the prestigious "Chungmuro 10 Million Viewers Club."

=== 2024 to present: Expansion into streaming series and "Nation's Father" title ===
In 2024, Park collaborated for the second time with Han Jae-rim on the Netflix black comedy series The 8 Show, based on the Naver webtoons Money Game and Pie Game by Bae Jin-soo. The series depicts the story of eight participants, each occupying one floor in an eight-story building, as they navigate a high-stakes environment where they must cooperate and antagonize each other. The game concludes when a death occurs. Park portrayed Tae-seok, a participant from the Sixth Floor. The 8 Show was released on Netflix on May 17, 2024, and received generally positive reviews.

In January 2024, Park was confirmed for the fourth collaboration with Kim Won-seok for Netflix's series When Life Gives You Tangerines. He played the role of middle-aged Yang Gwan-sik, while Park Bo-gum portrayed the character's younger self. The series premiered in March 2025. To authentically depict Gwan-sik's battle with cancer, Park underwent a rigorous physical transformation two weeks before filming hospital scenes. His regimen included aerobic exercise, dietary changes, and a strict "martial arts-style" hydration cycle that resulted in a weight loss of 7 to 8 kg within a single week. To maintain continuity, he requested that the director film all related scenes in a single day. His portrayal of a loyal husband and father triggered a massive surge in online searches for his name and the keyword "father" across South Korea, Asia, and Latin America. The "gray short padding" jacket worn by his character also became a trending fashion item. This popularity inspired the "Gwan-sik-byeong" (Gwan-sik-ness) meme, as netizens began using the phrase "my own Gwan-sik" to share stories of their own husbands or fathers. Consequently, the media dubbed Park the "Nation's Father."

Following this, Park starred in Hwang Byeong-guk's crime thriller film Yadang: The Snitch playing a tenacious drug investigator. Hwang cast Park as narcotics detective Oh Sang-jae after previously working with him during the filming of 12.12: The Day. Press praised his ability to seamlessly transition between contrasting roles on both the small and big screens, demonstrating his versatility as an actor.

Park returned to the small screen as the protagonist in Yoo Je-won's tvN's drama Love, Take Two. He plays Ryu Jeong-seok, a renowned international award winning architect and the single father of Bo-hyeon, played by Kim Min-kyu. His character is also the first love of Yum Jung-ah's character. Additionally, Park made a special appearance in the Netflix series Aema, as a reporter named Lee, who harasses the main character, Shin Joo-ae (portrayed by Bang Hyo-rin). Park earned acclaim for his versatility after portraying a character that contrasted sharply with his warmer roles in When Life Gives You Tangerines and Love, Take Two. His transformation was so complete that the director remarked on its startling effect on viewers.

He was confirmed for the Disney+ original series Tempest, a spy romance written by Jeong Seo-kyeong and directed by Kim Hee-won. Park joined an ensemble cast led by Jun Ji-hyun and Gang Dong-won, featuring John Cho, Lee Mi-sook, Kim Hae-sook, Yoo Jae-myung, Oh Jung-se, Lee Sang-hee, Joo Jong-hyuk, and Won Ji-an. The series premiered on Disney+ and Hulu on September 10, 2025.

== Personal life ==
After dating for seven years, Park and theater actress Oh Yu-jin married in 2011. The couple, who were seniors and juniors at the Korea National University of Arts,have two sons born in 2013 and 2017.

== Filmography ==
Key
†	Denotes films that have not yet been released

=== Film ===
Year	Title	Role	Notes	Ref.
2012	Helpless	Loan shark		
2013	Pluto	Detective Choi		
2013	Hwayi: A Monster Boy	Beom-soo		
2014	Genome Hazard	Kurosaki		
2014	See, Beethoven	Bad man		
2014	A Touch of Unseen	Gynecologist		
2015	The Accidental Detective	Joon-soo		
2015	4th Place	Kwang-soo		
2016	Pure Love	Min-ho		
2016	Missing	Park Hyun-ik		
2017	Heart Blackened	Dong Seong-sik		
2017	Warriors of the Dawn	Tarobe		
2018	Believer	Seon-chang		
2019	Jo Pil-ho: The Dawning Rage	Kwon Tae-joo		
2019	Bring Me Home	Myung-gook		
2019	Tune in for Love	Jong-woo		
2019	Cheer Up, Mr. Lee	Young-soo		
2019	Start-Up	Tae-sung	Special appearance	
2021	The 8th Night	Ho Tae		
2022	In Our Prime	Ahn Gi-chul		
2022	Broker	Yoon	Special appearance	
2022	Emergency Declaration	Tae-soo		
2022	20th Century Girl	School doctor	Special appearance	
2023	12.12: The Day	Noh Tae-geon		
2025	Yadang: The Snitch	Oh Sang-jae		
2026	Humint	Hwang Chi-seong		
TBA	Jung's Ranch †	Byung-soo		

=== Television series ===
Year	Title	Role	Notes	Ref.
2012	Jeon Woo-chi	Dae-geun		
2014	Doctor Stranger	Cha Jin-soo		
2014	Misaeng: Incomplete Life	Chun Kwan-woong		
2015	The Missing	Ha Tae-jo	guest appearance, Episodes 3-4	
2015	My Beautiful Bride	Park Hyung-sik		
2016	Wanted	Song Jung-ho		
2018	My Mister	Monk Gyum-duk		
2019	Arthdal Chronicles	Mu-baek		
2020	The World of the Married	Lee Tae-oh		
2022	I Haven't Done My Best Yet	Nam Geum-pil	TVING	
2023	Arthdal Chronicles: The Sword of Aramun	Mu-baek		
2024	The 8 Show	6F		
2025	When Life Gives You Tangerines	Middle-aged Yang Gwan-sik		
2025	Love, Take Two	Ryu Jeong-seok		
2025	Aema	Reporter Lee	Special appearance	
2025	Tempest	Jun-ik		
2026	We Are All Trying Here	Hwang Jin-man		

=== Television show ===
Year	Title	Role	Notes	Ref.
2026	The Village Barber	Part-timer	Season 1	

== Theater ==
=== Musicals ===
Year	Title		Role	Venue	Date	Ref.
Year	English	Korean	Role	Venue	Date	Ref.
2015	Moonlight Fairy and Girl	달빛요정과 소녀	BJ Ka-jun	Chungmu Art Hall Small Theater Blue Stage	January 20 to February 8, 2015	
2015	Moonlight Fairy and Girl	달빛요정과 소녀	BJ Ka-jun	YES24 Art One 1	May 8 to 31, 2015	
2019	Moonlight Fairy and Girl	달빛요정과 소녀	BJ Ka-jun	Daehangno SH Art Hall	January 7 to 20, 2019	

=== Plays ===
Year	Title		Role	Venue	Date	Ref.
Year	English	Korean	Role	Venue	Date	Ref.
2005	Agamemnon	아가멤논		Seoul Arts Center	April 23 to May 11, 2005	
2005	Othello, That Night	오셀로 오셀로		the National Theater's Byeoloreum Theater	December 6 to 11	
2006	Forget That Time	그때를 잊다	man	Woosuk Repertory Theater in Daehangno, Seoul	August 28 to September 3, 2006	
2007–2008	That Time, Stars Fall	그때, 별이 쏟아지다	Lee Hyun, Ji-min, Chan-doo, Hyuk-pil, Da-young	Lemon Art Hall (formerly Artsplay Theater 2 Hall)	November 8, 2007, to January 6, 2008	
2010–2011	Almost, Maine	올모스트 메인		Art One Chaimu Theater	December 22, 2010, to January 30, 2011	
2011	The Story of the Thief	늘근도둑 이야기	Mean man	Gunpo Cultural Arts Center, Gunpo	May 7 to 8, 2011	
2011	The Story of the Thief	늘근도둑 이야기	Mean man	Bok Sago Cultural Center, Bucheon	Nov 18 to 19, 2011	
2011	The Story of the Thief	늘근도둑 이야기	Mean man	Incheon Seogu Cultural Center, Incheon	Oct 21 to 22, 2011	
2011	Byeon	연	Yoo Sung-ok	Goyang Aram Nuri Theater	Oct 20 to 26, 2011	
2011	Byeon	연	Yoo Sung-ok	Daehangno T.O.M 2	Sep 16 to October 16, 2011	
2012	See, Beethoven	마르고 닳도록		Yeonwoo Small Theater in Daehangno	20 to 29, 2012	
2012–2013	There	거기	Lee Chun-bal	Art One Theater 3	September 7, 2012, to February 24, 2013	
2013	There	거기	Lee Chun-bal	MBC Lotte Art Hall	March 30–31	
2014	Dry and Worn Out	마르고 닳도록		Goyang Aram Nuri Theater, Goyang	Apr 10 to 12, 2014	
2015–2016	Twenty Twenty Chaimu — One Fine Day	스물스물 차이무 - 원파인데이	Jung-hoon	JTN Art Hall 2	Dec 4 to Jan 3	
2016	One Fine Day	원파인데이	Jung-hoon	COEX New Building 4F Grand Conference Room (Room 401)	May 8	

== Accolades ==
=== Awards and nominations ===
Name of the award ceremony, year presented, category, nominee of the award, and the result of the nomination
Award ceremony	Year	Category	Nominee / Work	Result	Ref.
APAN Star Awards	2021	Excellence Award, Actor in a Miniseries	The World of the Married	Won	
Baeksang Arts Awards	2019	Best Supporting Actor – Film	Believer	Nominated	
Baeksang Arts Awards	2026	Best Supporting Actor – Film	Humint	Nominated	
Blue Dragon Film Awards	2024	Best Supporting Actor	12.12: The Day	Nominated	
Buil Film Awards	2016	Best New Actor	4th Place	Nominated	
Buil Film Awards	2018	Best Supporting Actor	Believer	Nominated	
Dong-A.com's Pick (Note: Picked by Dong-A.com entertainment reporter)	2020	"Falling for Park Hae-jun is not a sin, right?" Acting Award	The World of the Married	Won	
Korea Culture and Entertainment Awards	2025	Best Actor	When Life Gives You Tangerines	Won	
Wildflower Film Awards	2017	Best Actor	4th Place	Nominated	

=== State honors ===
Name of country, year given, and name of honor
Country	Award Ceremony	Year	Honor or Award	Ref.
South Korea	Korean Popular Culture and Arts Awards (Note: Honors are given at the Korean Popular Culture and Arts Awards, arranged by the Korea Creative Content Agency and hosted by the Ministry of Culture, Sports and Tourism. They are awarded to those who have contributed to the arts and South Korea's pop culture.)	2025	Prime Minister's Commendation	

=== Listicles ===
Name of publisher, year listed, name of listicle, and placement
Publisher	Year	Listicle	Placement	Ref.
Korean Film Council	2021	Korean Actors 200 (Note: Introduces 200 actors that best represent the present and future of Korean cinema to the people in the film industry all over the world.)	Included	
