= Happiness (2007 film) =

- Hangul: 행복
- Hanja: 幸福
- RR: Haengbok
- MR: Haengbok
- Directed by: Hur Jin-ho
- Written by: Hur Jin-ho; Lee Suk-yeon; Seo Yoo-min; Shin Joon-ho
- Produced by: Jo Seong-woo; Kang Bong-rae; Lee Yoo-jin
- Starring: Hwang Jung-min; Im Soo-jung
- Cinematography: Kim Hyung-koo
- Edited by: Choi Jae-geun
- Music by: Jo Seong-woo
- Production company: Zip Cinema
- Distributed by: Showbox
- Release date: October 3, 2007
- Running time: 124 minutes
- Country: South Korea
- Language: Korean
- Budget: US$3.5 million
- Box office: US$8.3 million

Happiness (Korean: 행복; RR: Haengbok) is a 2007 South Korean romantic drama film directed by Hur Jin-ho, and starring Hwang Jung-min and Im Soo-jung. It is a love story about two people who meet while battling serious illnesses. The film was released in South Korea on October 3, 2007.

== Plot ==
When stricken with liver cirrhosis, Young-su leaves his careless high life in the city, live-in girlfriend, and dwindling nightclub business. He retreats to a rural sanatorium to receive treatment for his condition, where he meets Eun-hee, a young woman who is a long-term resident patient suffering from a severe lung disease that has left her with only about 40 percent lung capacity and places her at constant risk of respiratory failure. Soon they develop feelings for each other and leave the sanatorium together to live in a small but cozy farmhouse. Their health improves dramatically, but when Young-su's friends from the city come for a visit, he starts to wonder if he should abandon the mundane rural village and return to his former lifestyle.

Unable to overcome his growing dissatisfaction with country life, Young-su leaves Eun-hee and returns to Seoul with the hope of rebuilding his old life. His decision proves disastrous: his nightclub business fails once again, his renewed relationship with his former girlfriend quickly falls apart, and his liver cirrhosis relapses. Having lost everything, Young-su returns to the countryside to reunite with Eun-hee, only to discover that her lung condition has worsened to a terminal stage, leaving her bedridden and near death. Eun-hee silently forgives him before succumbing to her illness, leaving Young-su devastated. He mourns over her ashes before returning alone to the sanatorium, burdened by the consequences of abandoning the woman who had given him genuine love and happiness.

== Cast ==
- Hwang Jung-min as Young-soo
- Im Soo-jung as Eun-hee
- Kim Ki-chun as Boo-nam
- Yoo Seung-mok as Chae-gon
- Lee Jae-hun as Suk-woo
- Seo Jin-suk as Jin-suk
- Kim Jin-goo as Young-soo's mother
- Joo Boo-jin as doctor
- Min Kyung-jin as truck driver
- Oh Seo-won as medicine doctor
- Kim Chang-sub as waiter
- Kim In-sook as Mi-young
- Gong Hyo-jin as Soo-yeon
- Ryu Seung-soo as Dong-joon
- Park In-hwan as Suk-goo
- Shin Shin-ae as The director of a nursing home

== Accolades ==
Award	Year	Category	Recipient(s)	Result
Asian Film Awards	2008	Best Supporting Actress	Gong Hyo-jin	Nominated
Baeksang Arts Awards	2008	Best Film	Happiness	Nominated
Baeksang Arts Awards	2008	Best Actress	Im Soo-jung	Nominated
Blue Dragon Film Awards	2007	Best Film	Happiness	Nominated
Blue Dragon Film Awards	2007	Best Director	Hur Jin-ho	Won
Blue Dragon Film Awards	2007	Best Actor	Hwang Jung-min	Nominated
Blue Dragon Film Awards	2007	Best Actress	Im Soo-jung	Nominated
Blue Dragon Film Awards	2007	Best Screenplay	Hur Jin-ho, Lee Suk-yeon, Seo Yoo-min and Shin Joon-ho	Nominated
Blue Dragon Film Awards	2007	Best Cinematography	Kim Hyung-koo	Nominated
Blue Dragon Film Awards	2007	Best Lighting	Jung Young-min	Nominated
Blue Dragon Film Awards	2007	Best Music	Jo Seong-woo	Nominated
Buil Film Awards	2008	Best Director	Hur Jin-ho	Nominated
Buil Film Awards	2008	Best Actress	Im Soo-jung	Nominated
Buil Film Awards	2008	Best Cinematography	Kim Hyung-koo	Nominated
Grand Bell Awards	2008	Best Film	Happiness	Nominated
Grand Bell Awards	2008	Best Director	Hur Jin-ho	Nominated
Grand Bell Awards	2008	Best Actor	Hwang Jung-min	Nominated
Grand Bell Awards	2008	Best Actress	Im Soo-jung	Nominated
Grand Bell Awards	2008	Best Supporting Actress	Gong Hyo-jin	Nominated
Grand Bell Awards	2008	Best Screenplay	Hur Jin-ho, Lee Suk-yeon, Seo Yoo-min and Shin Joon-ho	Nominated
Grand Bell Awards	2008	Best Cinematography	Kim Hyung-koo	Nominated
Korean Association of Film Critics Awards	2007	Best Screenplay	Hur Jin-ho, Lee Suk-yeon, Seo Yoo-min and Shin Joon-ho	Won
Korean Film Awards	2007	Best Film	Happiness	Nominated
Korean Film Awards	2007	Best Director	Hur Jin-ho	Nominated
Korean Film Awards	2007	Best Supporting Actress	Gong Hyo-jin	Won
