= The Village: Achiara's Secret =

- Promotional poster
- Genre: Thriller; Mystery
- Written by: Do Hyun-jung
- Directed by: Lee Yong-suk (SBS)
- Starring: Moon Geun-young; Yook Sung-jae; Shin Eun-kyung; On Joo-wan; Jang Hee-jin
- Country of origin: South Korea
- Original language: Korean
- No. of episodes: 16

Production
- Running time: 65 minutes
- Production companies: The Story Works; RaemongRaein

Original release
- Network: SBS
- Release: 7 October – 3 December 2015

The Village: Achiara's Secret (Korean: 마을 – 아치아라의 비밀; RR: Maeul – Achiaraui bimil) is a 2015 South Korean television series starring Yook Sung-jae and Moon Geun-young. It aired on SBS from 7 October – 3 December 2015 on Wednesdays and Thursdays at 21:55 for 16 episodes.

== Plot ==
Achiara is a quiet, peaceful village with hardly any crime. However, on her first day in the town, English teacher Han So-yoon discovers a buried corpse. As the townspeople speculate on the identity of the dead person and the reason she was killed, rookie policeman Park Woo-jae – who has finally accomplished his dream of becoming a policeman after failing the exam three times – team up with So-yoon to uncover the secrets hidden in the seemingly idyllic town.

== Cast ==
=== Main characters ===
- Moon Geun-young as Han So-yoon

So-yoon decides to travel back to Korea after discovering a strange letter which points to the village of Achiara after her grandmother's death. Upon her arrival, she starts her search for the sender of the letter and realizes her family has many hidden secrets unbeknownst to her.

- Yook Sung-jae as Park Woo-jae

Woo-jae is an enthusiastic police officer whose police post based in the village Achiara. After a period of peace and low crime rates in the village, Woo-jae gets excited when a chain of serial murders occur and tries his utmost to solve the mystery.

=== Supporting characters ===
- Shin Eun-kyung as Yoon Ji-sook
- On Joo-wan as Seo Ki-hyun
- Jang Hee-jin as Kim Hye-jin
- Park Eun-seok as Nam Gun-woo
- Lee Yul-eum as Shin Ga-young
- Kim Min-jae as Inspector Han
- Jang So-yeon as Kang Joo-hee
- Ahn Seo-hyun as Seo Yoo-na
- Jung Sung-mo as Seo Chang-kwon
- Woo Hyun-joo as Choi Kyung-soon
- Choi Won-hong as Ba-woo
- Choi Jae-woong as Kang Pil-sung
- Ryu Tae-ho as Head of police station
- Kim Yong-rim as Chang-kwon's mother
- Jung Soo-young as Cha Min-joo
- Kim Sun-hwa as Mrs. Hong
- Moon Ji-in as Soon-young
- Jo Han-chul as Choi Hyung-kil
- Park Min-jung as Town Lady
- Jung Ae-ri as Ji-sook's mother

== Ratings ==
The blue color indicates lowest rating while red color indicates highest rating.

Episode #	Original broadcast date	Average audience share			
Episode #	Original broadcast date	TNmS Ratings		AGB Nielsen	
Episode #	Original broadcast date	Nationwide	Seoul National Capital Area	Nationwide	Seoul National Capital Area
1	7 October 2015	6.2%	7.5%	6.9%	7.5%
2	8 October 2015	6.1%	6.9%	5.9%	6.1%
3	14 October 2015	7.0%	8.1%	7.1%	7.8%
4	15 October 2015	5.5%	6.5%	5.2%	5.9%
5	21 October 2015	4.6%	7.2%	5.1%	5.5%
6	22 October 2015	5.7%	7.3%	5.2%	5.6%
7	28 October 2015	4.7%	5.7%	4.8%	5.4%
8	29 October 2015	5.8%	7.7%	7.0%	8.1%
9	4 November 2015	4.8%	5.8%	4.9%	5.7%
10	5 November 2015	5.1%	6.0%	5.4%	5.9%
11	12 November 2015	7.4%	8.2%	6.3%	6.7%
12	18 November 2015	4.5%	–	5.7%	6.3%
13	19 November 2015	4.4%	5.4%	5.9%	6.3%
14	25 November 2015	4.6%	6.0%	5.5%	5.8%
15	2 December 2015	4.3%	4.9%	6.8%	8.2%
16	3 December 2015	6.1%	7.2%	7.6%	9.0%
Average		5.5%	6.5%	5.9%	6.3%

== Awards and nominations ==
Year	Award	Category	Recipient	Result
2015	23rd SBS Drama Awards	Excellence Award, Actress in a Miniseries	Moon Geun-young	Won
2015	23rd SBS Drama Awards	Excellence Award, Actress in a Miniseries	Shin Eun-kyung	Nominated
2015	23rd SBS Drama Awards	Top 10 Stars	Moon Geun-young	Won
2015	23rd SBS Drama Awards	Special Award, Actress in a Miniseries	Jang So-yeon	Nominated
2015	23rd SBS Drama Awards	New Star Award	Yook Sung-jae	Won
2015	23rd SBS Drama Awards	New Star Award	Lee Yul-eum	Won

== International broadcast ==
- Malaysia – It aired on ONE TV ASIA between 8 October 2015 to 4 December 2015. Each episode aired within 24 hours after the original South Korean broadcast with a variety of subtitles.
- Singapore – It aired on ONE TV ASIA between 8 October 2015 to 4 December 2015. Each episode aired within 24 hours after the original South Korean broadcast with a variety of subtitles.
- Indonesia – It aired on ONE TV ASIA between 8 October 2015 to 4 December 2015. Each episode aired within 24 hours after the original South Korean broadcast with a variety of subtitles.

== Notes ==
- The broadcast of Ep. 11 scheduled on 11 November 2015, was cancelled due to the baseball match.
- The broadcast of Ep. 15 scheduled on 26 November 2015, was cancelled due to the 36th Blue Dragon Film Awards.
