= Rules of Dating =

- Theatrical poster
- Hangul: 연애의 목적
- Hanja: 戀愛의 目的
- RR: Yeonaeui mokjeok
- MR: Yŏnaeŭi mokchŏk
- Directed by: Han Jae-rim
- Written by: Go Yoon-hee
- Produced by: Cha Seung-jae; Im Choong-ryul; Yoon Sang-oh
- Starring: Park Hae-il; Kang Hye-jung; Lee Dae-yeon; Greena Park; Seo Yeong-hwa
- Cinematography: Park Yong-su
- Edited by: Park Gok-ji; Jeong Jin-hee
- Music by: Lee Byung-woo
- Distributed by: CJ Entertainment
- Release date: June 10, 2005
- Running time: 121 minutes
- Country: South Korea
- Language: Korean
- Box office: US$11 million

Rules of Dating (Korean: 연애의 목적; lit. 'The Purpose of Love') is a 2005 South Korean film starring Park Hae-il and Kang Hye-jung, and is the directorial debut of filmmaker Han Jae-rim.

== Plot ==
Lee Yu-rim, a high school English teacher, is interested in dating Choi Hong, a student teacher, even though she is one year older than Yu-rim. Choi is cynical and always plays hard-to-get when Yurim shows interest in her because she has a boyfriend. While going out for drinks one night, Yu-rim suddenly tells Hong that he wants to have sex with her. Hong is hardly impressed. Although the sexual advances are pretty one sided from Yurim to Hong, both Yu-rim and Hong begin to be unsure of what each other wants and what they want themselves, as Hong's boyfriend is disinterested in her. Choi is later revealed to have some kind of trauma from being framed as a stalker by her former lover who was a married person, which led to her being fired from her previous school and rejecting any kind of love and seek stability over love. Based on common ground that was formed through their encounters ever since they first met, they begin to understand each other, however, because of bad rumors spreading on the school website about the traumatizing event which was framed as a promiscuity issue on Hong's part. Hong sues Yu-rim to save her image as well as confessing all of Yurim's inappropriate behavior and Yu-rim is fired from his job for inappropriate sexual behavior in the workplace with Hong. The film ends with Hong and Yurim reuniting as a couple, as Hong thanks Yurim for ending her insomnia due to her traumatic event.

== Awards and nominations ==
2005 Busan Film Critics Awards

- Best Film – Rules of Dating
- Best Leading Actress – Kang Hye-jung
- Best Screenplay – Go Yoon-hee
- Best New Director – Han Jae-rim

2005 Blue Dragon Film Awards

- Best Screenplay – Go Yoon-hee and Han Jae-rim
- Nomination – Best Leading Actor – Park Hae-il
- Nomination – Best Leading Actress – Kang Hye-jung
- Nomination – Best New Director – Han Jae-rim

2005 Korean Film Awards

- Nomination – Best Film – Rules of Dating
- Nomination – Best Leading Actor – Park Hae-il
- Nomination – Best Leading Actress – Kang Hye-jung
- Nomination – Best Screenplay – Go Yoon-hee and Han Jae-rim
- Nomination – Best Music – Lee Byung-woo
- Nomination – Best New Director – Han Jae-rim

2006 Baeksang Arts Awards

- Best Screenplay – Go Yoon-hee
- Nomination – Best Leading Actor – Park Hae-il
- Nomination – Best Leading Actress – Kang Hye-jung

2006 Grand Bell Awards

- Best New Director – Han Jae-rim

== Reception ==
Cho Jung-bin, writing for the youth magazine Cultura in the year 2023, thought the film did not age well because of how it deals with the matter of consent. Cho also discussed how the film tells only the man's side of the story, despite clearly depicting sexual harassment and rape by the male protagonist, thereby minimizing its impact.
