= Lee Yul-eum =

South Korean actress (born 1996)

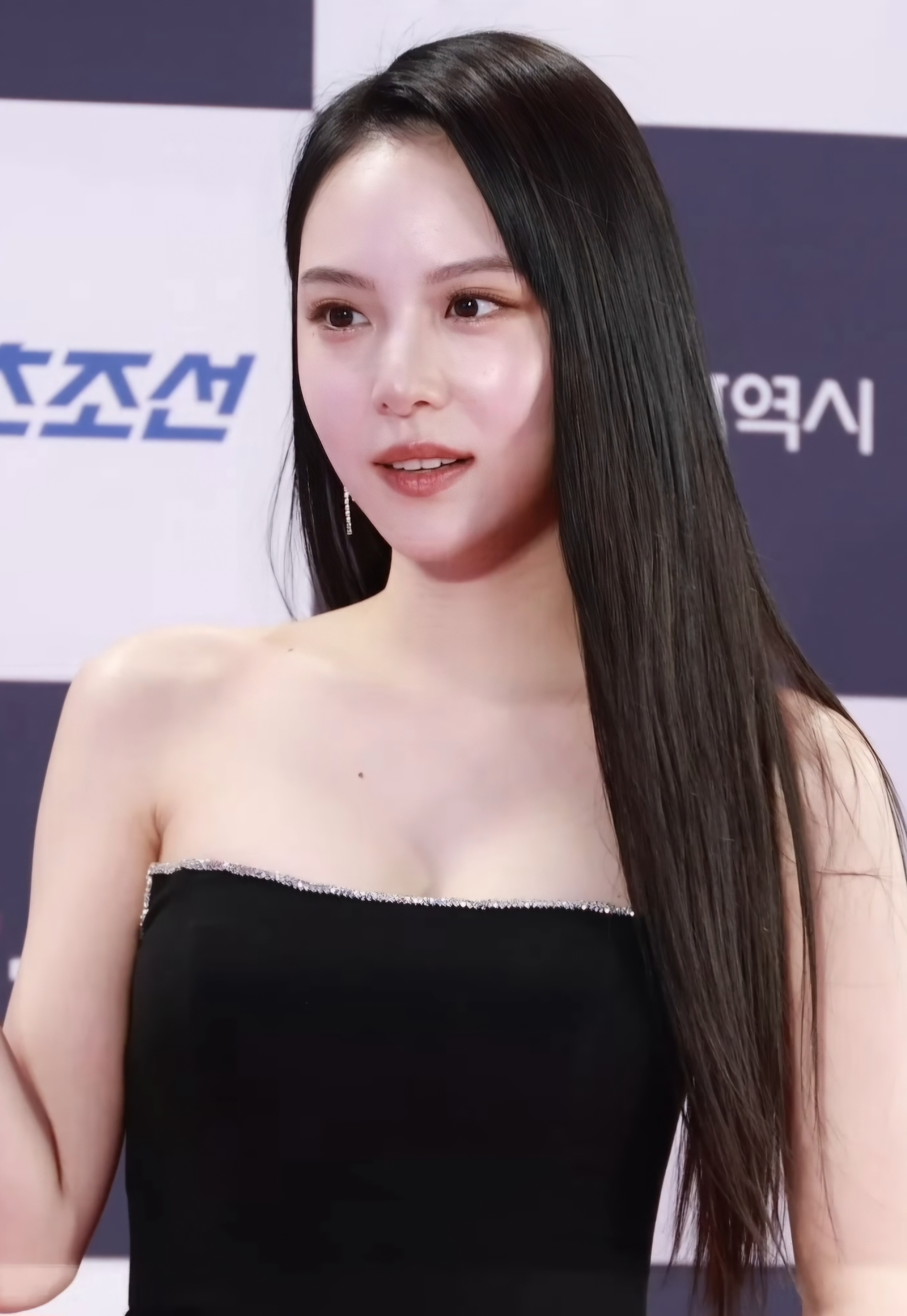
- Lee in July 2024
- Born: February 16, 1996 (age 30); Seoul, South Korea
- Occupation: Actress
- Years active: 2013–present
- Agent: Namoo Actors

Korean name
- Hangul: 이현정
- RR: I Hyeonjeong
- MR: I Hyŏnjŏng

Stage name
- Hangul: 이열음
- RR: I Yeoleum
- MR: I Yŏrŭm

Lee Hyun-jung (Korean: 이현정; born February 16, 1996), better known by the stage name Lee Yul-eum (이열음), is a South Korean actress. She is best known for her roles in television series such as The Village: Achiara's Secret, Dae Jang Geum Is Watching, Queen: Love and War, Nevertheless, and Dear X.

== Personal life ==
In June 2019, as part of the South Korean television show Law of the Jungle, Lee was filmed catching and subsequently cooking three endangered giant clams in Hat Chao Mai National Park. She faced up to five years imprisonment and a fine of up to 40,000 baht if found guilty violating the National Parks and Wildlife Protection laws.

On August 21, 2023, a dating rumor with South Korean film director Han Jae-rim broke out. A year later, they denied the dating rumors at the press conference for the drama The 8 Show.

== Filmography ==
=== Film ===
Year	Title	Role	Ref.
2020	Beyond That Mountain	Gang Mal-son	
2022	Urban Myths	Soo-jin	
2022	Emergency Declaration	Park Shi-young	
TBA	Shinjikki	Shinjikki	

=== Television series ===
Year	Title	Role	Ref.
2013	Can't Stand Anymore	Park Eun-mi	
2013	Drama Festival: "Boy Meets Girl"	Ha-kyeong	
2014	High School King of Savvy	Jung Yoo-ah	
2014	KBS Drama Special: "Middle School Student A"	Jo Eun-seo	
2014	High School King of Savvy	Jung Yoo-ah	
2015	Divorce Lawyer in Love	Woo Yoo-mi	
2015	Save the Family	Oh Se-mi	
2015	The Village: Achiara's Secret	Shin Ga-yeong	
2016	Monster	Cha Jung-eun	
2018	My First Love	Han Ji-soo	
2018	KBS Drama Special: "My Mother's Third Marriage"	Oh Eun-soo	
2018	Dae Jang Geum Is Watching	Han Ji-min	
2019	Queen: Love and War	Jo Young-ji	
2020	Touch	Girl on the plane	
2021	Nevertheless	Yoon Seol-ah	
2025	Dear X	Im Re-na	

=== Web series ===
Year	Title	Role	Ref.
2024	The 8 Show	Kim Yang	

== Awards and nominations ==
Name of the award ceremony, year presented, category, nominee of the award, and the result of the nomination
Award ceremony	Year	Category	Nominee / Work	Result	Ref.
Blue Dragon Series Awards	2024	Best New Actress	The 8 Show	Nominated	
MBC Drama Awards	2016	Best New Actress	Monster	Nominated	
MBC Entertainment Awards	2018	Awards Music/Talk Category Female Rookie of the Year Award	Dae Jang Geum Is Watching	Nominated	
SBS Drama Awards	2015	New Star Award	The Village: Achiara's Secret	Won	
