= High School King of Savvy =

2014 South Korean television series

- Hangul: 고교처세왕
- Hanja: 高校處世王
- RR: Gogyo cheosewang
- MR: Kogyo ch'ŏsewang
- Genre: Romance; Workplace comedy
- Written by: Jo Sung-hee; Yang Hee-seung
- Directed by: Yoo Je-won
- Starring: Seo In-guk; Lee Ha-na; Lee Soo-hyuk; Lee Yul-eum
- Country of origin: South Korea
- Original language: Korean
- No. of episodes: 17 + 1 (special)

Production
- Production location: South Korea
- Production company: Chorokbaem Media

Original release
- Network: tvN
- Release: June 16 – August 11, 2014

High School King of Savvy (Korean: 고교처세왕) is a 2014 South Korean television series starring Seo In-guk, Lee Ha-na, Lee Soo-hyuk, and Lee Yul-eum. It aired on tvN from June 16 to August 11, 2014, on Mondays and Tuesdays at 23:00 (KST) for 17 episodes.

== Synopsis ==
Lee Min-suk (Seo In-guk) is a high school student and varsity ice hockey player. He and his older brother, Hyung-suk, look very much alike despite their nine-year age gap. When he gets a mysterious phone call from Hyung-suk telling him to impersonate him at the latter's new job, Min-suk is forced to pretend to be a high-ranking executive at an IT conglomerate. Living a double life while unaware of the rules within the Korean workplace, Min-suk learns how to navigate his way in the world of adults with the help of Jung Soo-young (Lee Ha-na), a temp with an odd personality whom he eventually falls in love with.

== Cast ==
=== Main ===
- Seo In-guk as Lee Min-suk / Lee Hyung-suk
  - Seo Dong-hyun as young Lee Min-suk

Lee Min-suk is an 18-year-old high school student who impersonates his 28-year-old brother, Lee Hyung-suk, at the latter's new job as director of Retail Team at Comfo Company.

- Lee Ha-na as Jung Soo-young

A 28-year-old contract employee of Retail Team at Comfo Company, and later Lee Min-suk/Lee Hyung-suk's secretary.

- Lee Soo-hyuk as Yoo Jin-woo

The 30-year-old director of Project Team at Comfo Company, and illegitimate son of the company's chairman.

- Lee Yul-eum as Jung Yoo-ah

Jung Soo-young's sister, an 18-year-old high school student.

=== Supporting ===
==== People around Lee Min-suk ====
- Oh Kwang-rok as Choi Jang-ho, Lee Min-suk's and Lee Hyung-suk adoptive father
- Kwon Sung-duk as Choi Man-suk, Lee Min-suk's and Lee Hyung-suk adoptive grandfather

==== People at Poong Jin High School ====
- Kang Ki-young as Jo Duk-hwan, Lee Min-suk's friend and classmate
- Lee Tae-hwan as Oh Tae-suk, Lee Min-suk's friend and classmate
- Kim Seung-hoon as Kim Dae-chul, Lee Min-suk's ice hockey coach
- Ji Yoon-ho as Park Ki-hoon, Lee Min-suk's senior in ice hockey team

==== People at Comfo company ====
- Han Jin-hee as Yoo Jae-guk, chairman of Comfo Company
- Song Young-kyu as Nam Sang-goo, director of Comfo Company
- Jo Han-chul as Kim Chang-soo, team leader of Retail Team
- Kim Won-hae as Han Young-suk, director of Comfo Company
- Park Soo-young as Yoon Dong-jae, assistant manager of Retail Team
- Choi Phillip as Park Heung-bae, employee of Retail Team
- Lee Joo-seung as Ji Dae-han, employee of Retail Team
- Lee Ah-rin as Han Sang-hee, employee of Retail Team
- Shin Hye-sun as Go Yoon-joo, employee of Retail Team
- Chun Yi-seul as Yoon Do-ji, employee of Retail Team

==== Special appearances ====
- Yoon Yoo-sun as Yoo Jin-woo's mother
- Jang Se-hyun as Yoo Jin-woo's friend
- Min Ji-ah as Jung Soo-young's hometown friend
- Shim Hyung-tak as a busy boyfriend
- Lee Chung-ah as attractive girl
- Park Hee-von as contract girl
- Hana as Park Jin-joo
- Yein as Lee Bit-na

== Production ==
The first script reading was held on April 25, 2014, at the CJ E&M Centre in Sangam-dong, Seoul, South Korea. Filming commenced in early May 2014.

Seo trained with the Kwangwoon University hockey team for two months in preparation for his role as an ice hockey player.

On July 22, 2014, it was announced that the series would be extended by one episode, and a special broadcast would be aired following the end of the 17 episodes.

== Original soundtrack ==
No.	Title	Artist	Length
1.	"고교처세왕 Title" (High School King of Savvy - Title)	Various Artists	0:33
2.	"One Way"	Trans Fixion	3:56
3.	"살다가보면" (As Life Goes On)	Jung-in	3:52
4.	"설렘" (Fluttering Heart)	Honey G	3:47
5.	"돌아오는 길" (Finding Myself)	Seo In-guk	3:43
6.	"Butterfly"	Ciel	3:38
7.	"돌아오는 길 (Inst.)" (Finding Myself (Inst.))	Various Artists	3:43
8.	"빅뉴스" (Big News)	Various Artists	1:54
9.	"무조건 열심히"	Various Artists	2:20
10.	"Blue Sky"	Various Artists	2:18
11.	"Raining"	Various Artists	3:10
12.	"Sundown"	Various Artists	2:18
13.	"우정"	Various Artists	1:58
14.	"정비서"	Various Artists	2:01
15.	"Ice Field"	Various Artists	2:18
16.	"Run"	Various Artists	2:31
17.	"고마워요" (Thank You)	Various Artists	2:36

== Ratings ==
- In this table, the blue numbers represent the lowest ratings and the red numbers represent the highest ratings.
- N/A denotes that the rating is not known.

Ep.	Original broadcast date	Average audience share
Ep.	Original broadcast date	AGB Nielsen
Ep.	Original broadcast date	Nationwide
1	June 16, 2014	1.472%
2	June 17, 2014	1.33%
3	June 23, 2014	1.662%
4	June 24, 2014	1.081%
5	June 30, 2014	1.743%
6	July 1, 2014	1.95%
7	July 7, 2014	1.513%
8	July 8, 2014	1.718%
9	July 14, 2014	1.446%
10	July 15, 2014	1.851%
11	July 21, 2014	2.091%
12	July 22, 2014	1.923%
13	July 28, 2014	1.526%
14	July 29, 2014	1.492%
15	August 4, 2014	1.742%
16	August 5, 2014	1.913%
17	August 11, 2014	1.830%
Average		1.66%
Special	August 12, 2014	—N/a

- This drama airs on a cable channel/pay TV which normally has a relatively smaller audience compared to free-to-air TV/public broadcasters (KBS, SBS, MBC and EBS).

== Awards and nominations ==
Year	Award	Category	Recipient	Result
2014	7th Korea Drama Awards	Excellence Award, Actor	Seo In-guk	Nominated
2016	tvN10 Awards	Best Kiss	Seo In-guk and Lee Ha-na	Nominated
2016	tvN10 Awards	Best Chemi	Seo In-guk (as Lee Min-suk) and Seo In-guk (as Lee Hyung-suk)	Nominated

== International broadcast ==
- tvN Asia
- Thailand - Workpoint TV: starting February 1, 2015
- Taiwan - GTV: starting May 29, 2015
- Malaysia - Tv9: starting February 16, 2016
- Ghana - Joy Prime
