= The Show Must Go On (2007 film) =

- Theatrical release poster
- Hangul: 우아한 세계
- Hanja: 우아한 世界
- RR: Uahan segye
- MR: Uahan segye
- Directed by: Han Jae-rim
- Written by: Han Jae-rim
- Produced by: Kang Tae-woo; Jeong Young-joo
- Starring: Song Kang-ho; Park Ji-young; Oh Dal-su; Yoon Je-moon; Choi Il-hwa
- Cinematography: Park Yong-soo
- Edited by: Kim Sun-min
- Music by: Yoko Kanno
- Distributed by: Lotte Entertainment
- Release date: 5 April 2007
- Running time: 112 minutes
- Country: South Korea
- Language: Korean
- Box office: US$6.7 million

The Show Must Go On (Korean: 우아한 세계; RR: Uahan segye; lit. 'Elegant World') is a 2007 South Korean crime comedy film written and directed by Han Jae-rim. The film stars Song Kang-ho as a gangster who aspires to be a full-time husband and father. It was released in South Korea on 5 April 2007.

== Plot ==
Kang In-gu is a middle-aged mid-level gangster who supports his wife Mi-ryung and teenage daughter Hee-soo. After forcing a construction executive into signing a lucrative apartment development contract, In-gu becomes embroiled in a territorial dispute with a rival gang while facing political pressure from Noh Sang-moo, the ambitious younger brother of his boss Chairman Noh. At home, his family grows increasingly ashamed of his criminal life. His daughter resents him, his wife's patience wears thin, and his attempts to compensate through money and intimidation only deepen the emotional divide.

As labor unrest threatens the construction project, In-gu is seriously injured during a clash with striking workers. Mi-ryung warns that she can no longer live this way, prompting him to dream of buying a countryside home with the profits from the deal. However, his family life deteriorates further after he discovers Hee-soo's diary, in which she wishes he were dead. Drunk and emotionally devastated, he confronts her with a kitchen knife, demanding that she kill him if she truly means it. The incident ends with police intervention, humiliating In-gu in front of his daughter and leaving him increasingly isolated after Mi-ryung forces him out of their bedroom.

Soon afterward, In-gu survives a knife attack by three assailants. Although his superiors pressure him to let the matter go, he investigates on his own and learns from his childhood friend Hyun-soo, a member of the rival gang, that the attack was orchestrated from within his own organization. Evidence points to Noh Sang-moo, who arranged the assassination in order to eliminate In-gu and seize control of the construction profits. Enraged, In-gu brutally assaults Sang-moo and his lieutenant, only to be rebuked by Chairman Noh for attacking his brother. Hoping to leave his criminal life behind, In-gu travels to Jeju Island to reconcile with Mi-ryung and Hee-soo, but Mi-ryung instead insists on divorce.

Determined to quit the organization, In-gu visits the hospitalized Sang-moo to make peace, but Sang-moo betrays him by stabbing him, triggering another violent struggle. In-gu abducts the wounded gangster and flees by car while being pursued by Sang-moo's men. A reckless chase ends in a massive traffic collision that kills most of the pursuers. Afterward, In-gu drives Sang-moo to one of Chairman Noh's favorite hunting grounds, intending to confront the boss, only to discover that Sang-moo has died in the trunk during the escape. When Chairman Noh arrives and finds his brother's body, he shoots In-gu in the knee. Fighting for his life, In-gu wrestles away the gun and fatally shoots the chairman.

In-gu survives surgery and dismantles what remains of his old organization while awaiting trial. Although he tells his family he is leaving the gangster life behind, he secretly asks Hyun-soo to secure him a position in the rival gang. After his release from prison, he finally purchases the countryside house he had always wanted, but his family remains emotionally distant. Mi-ryung and Hee-soo eventually move to Canada for Hee-soo's education, leaving him to live alone. One year later, In-gu is diagnosed with diabetes but continues working as a gangster. Alone in his new home, he watches a videotape sent by his family from Canada. Smiling through tears before breaking down in grief, he throws his bowl of noodles across the room, then silently cleans up the mess as the recording continues without him.

== Cast ==
- Song Kang-ho as Kang In-gu
- Park Ji-young as Mi-ryung
- Oh Dal-su as Hyun-soo
- Yoon Je-moon as Director Noh Sang-moo
- Choi Il-hwa as Chairman Noh
- Kim So-eun as Hee-soo
- Choi Jong-ryul as owner of dumpling restaurant
- Jung In-gi as police chief
- Kim Kyeong-ik as Hee-soo's teacher
- Kwon Tae-won as police chief of police substation
- Lee Dae-yeon as company president Baek
- Oh Jung-se as manager
- Lydia Park as female employee
- Lee Yong-yi as granny in broken-down home
- Min Seong-wook as Director Noh's subordinate
- Son Se-bin as daughter of woman in mourning
- Park Jin-woo as reporter
- Lee Jang-hoon as Yong-seok

== Release ==
The film was released in South Korea on April 5, 2007, and received a total of 1,025,781 admissions nationwide.

== Accolades ==
Award ceremony	Year	Category	Recipient(s)	Result	Ref.
Baeksang Arts Awards	2008	Best Actor	Song Kang-ho	Nominated	
Blue Dragon Film Awards	2007	Best Film	The Show Must Go On	Won	
Blue Dragon Film Awards	2007	Best Director	Han Jae-rim	Nominated	
Blue Dragon Film Awards	2007	Best Actor	Song Kang-ho	Won	
Blue Dragon Film Awards	2007	Best Screenplay	Han Jae-rim	Nominated	
Blue Dragon Film Awards	2007	Best Music	Yoko Kanno	Nominated	
Grand Bell Awards	2007	Best Supporting Actress	Park Ji-young	Nominated	
