= 28th Blue Dragon Film Awards =

2007 edition of award ceremony

- Date: November 23, 2007
- Site: Hae Main Hall, National Theater of Korea, Seoul, South Korea
- Hosted by: Jung Joon-ho; Kim Hye-soo

Television coverage
- Network: KBS

The 28th Blue Dragon Film Awards ceremony was held on November 23, 2007 at the National Theater of Korea in Seoul, South Korea. Hosted by actors Jung Joon-ho and Kim Hye-soo, it was presented by Sports Chosun and broadcast on KBS.

== Nominations and winners ==
Complete list of nominees and winners:

(Winners denoted in bold)

Best Film	Best Director
**The Show Must Go On**; 200 Pounds Beauty; Happiness; May 18; Voice of a Murderer	**Hur Jin-ho** - **Happiness**; Han Jae-rim - The Show Must Go On; Kim Ji-hoon - May 18; Kim Yong-hwa - 200 Pounds Beauty; Park Jin-pyo - Voice of a Murderer
Best Actor	Best Actress
**Song Kang-ho** - **The Show Must Go On**; Hwang Jung-min - Happiness; Joo Jin-mo - A Love; Kim Sang-kyung - May 18; Sul Kyung-gu - Voice of a Murderer	**Jeon Do-yeon** - **Secret Sunshine**; Im Soo-jung - Happiness; Kim Ah-joong - 200 Pounds Beauty; Lee Yo-won - May 18; Song Hye-kyo - Hwang Jin-yi
Best Supporting Actor	Best Supporting Actress
**Kim Sang-ho** - **The Happy Life**; Jo Han-sun - Cruel Winter Blues; Kim Min-jun - A Love; Kim Yeong-cheol - My Father; Park Chul-min - May 18; Sung Ji-ru - Paradise Murdered	**Na Moon-hee** - **Cruel Winter Blues**; Im Jung-eun - Shadows in the Palace; Park Si-yeon - A Love; Park Sol-mi - Paradise Murdered; Yoo Sun - Black House
Best New Actor	Best New Actress
**Daniel Henney** - **My Father**; Jang Keun-suk - The Happy Life; Jung Ji-hoon - I'm a Cyborg, But That's OK; Lee Min-ki - A Good Day to Have an Affair; Yoo Ah-in - Skeletons in the Closet	**Jung Ryeo-won** - **Two Faces of My Girlfriend**; Han Ji-min - The Cut; Hwang Bo-ra - Skeletons in the Closet; Kim Tae-hee - The Restless; Lee Tae-ran - Love Exposure
Best New Director	Best Screenplay
**Kim Han-min** - **Paradise Murdered**; Hwang Dong-hyuk - My Father; Jung Sik, Jung Bum-shik - Epitaph; Kim Mee-jung - Shadows in the Palace; Lee Jeong-beom - Cruel Winter Blues	**Kim Han-min** - **Paradise Murdered**; Han Jae-rim - The Show Must Go On; Hur Jin-ho, Lee Suk-yeon, Seo Yoo-min, Shin Joon-ho - Happiness; Kim Yong-hwa - 200 Pounds Beauty; Na Hyun - May 18
Best Cinematography	Best Lighting
**Yoon Nam-joo** - **Epitaph**; Choi Young-taek - Hwang Jin-yi; Kim Hyung-koo - Happiness; Kim Yong-heung - Paradise Murdered; Lee Doo-man - May 18	**Im Jae-young** - **Hwang Jin-yi**; Jung Young-min - Happiness; Kim Ji-hoon - Epitaph; Lee Sung-jae - Black House; Park Se-mun - Shadows in the Palace
Best Art Direction	Best Music
**Lee Min-bok, Kim Yu-jeong** - **Epitaph**; Kim Jin-cheol, Jung Ku-ho - Hwang Jin-yi; Kim Ki-chul - The Restless; Park Il-hyun - May 18; Ryu Seong-hui - I'm a Cyborg, But That's OK	**Bang Jun-seok, Lee Byung-hoon** - **The Happy Life**; Ji Park - Skeletons in the Closet; Jo Seong-woo - Happiness; Yoko Kanno - The Show Must Go On; Lee Jae-hak - 200 Pounds Beauty
Technical Award	Popular Star Award
**DTI-ETRI** - **The Restless (CG)**; Jung Ku-ho, Jeong Jeong-eun - Hwang Jin-yi (Costume Design); Kim Sang-bum, Kim Jae-bum - Epitaph (Editing); Younggu Art Studios - D-War (CG); Younggu Art Studios - D-War (Special Effects)	**Hwang Jung-min** - **Happiness**; **Joo Jin-mo** - **A Love**; **Kim Ah-joong** - **200 Pounds Beauty**; **Kim Tae-hee** - **The Restless**
Audience Choice Award for Most Popular Film
**D-War**
