= Kim So-jin =

South Korean actress (born 1979)

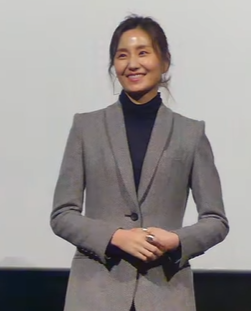
- Kim in 2018
- Born: December 12, 1979 (age 46); Inje County, South Korea
- Education: Chung-Ang University - Department of Theater; Korea National University of Arts - M.A in Fine Arts
- Occupation: Actress
- Years active: 2006–present
- Agent: Andmarq

Korean name
- Hangul: 김소진
- Hanja: 金素辰
- RR: Gim Sojin
- MR: Kim Sojin

Kim So-jin (Korean: 김소진; Hanja: 金素辰; born on December 12, 1979) is a South Korean actress. She is known for playing a prosecutor in crime drama The King (2017), for which she received critical acclaim and won several awards, including the Blue Dragon Film Award, Grand Bell Award and Baeksang Arts Award for Best Supporting Actress. Since then, in films ranging from The Drug King to The Man Standing Next, she has fully immersed herself in each role, adding freshness to her seasoned acting skills and building her own unique characters.

== Career ==
Kim So-jin, was graduated from Chung-Ang University's Department of Theater. While studying, she stumbled upon the play Birds Do Not Cross at the Crosswalk, which sparked her interest in theater. After completing her studies at Chung-Ang University, she further developed her skills by participating in the project group Ari Korea and performing abroad for a year.

Kim made her debut in 2008 with the play Starting Rasa. In 2009, she acted in the play Yi Sang, Count to Thirteen, experiencing a transformative rebirth on stage.

Kim holds master's degree in the Korea National University of Arts. She is a member of the theater company Chaimu. With the company, she has performed in plays including "Song of Spring Flows in the Sea", "Beethoven", "Road to Santiago", and "Starting Rasa". She has also appeared in the musical "Midnight Serenade". She began to receive attention in 2012 for her performances in the plays "Pung Chan Nosoog" and "Song of Spring Flows in the Sea". She has been described as a "trusted treasure", a term for a dependable actor

With the film Haunters (directed by Kim Min-seok), which was released in 2010, establishing herself as a talented actor in the film industry.

In 2014, She joined Musical 'Moonlight Fairy and Girl' Directed by Min Bok-ki, CEO of Theater Troupe Chaimu.

Furthermore, in the 2017 film The King, Kim So-jin left a lasting impression with her portrayal of Prosecutor Ahn Hee-yeon, delivering memorable lines that were so convincing that she was mistaken for an actual prosecutor. Her exceptional synchronization with the character received high praise. As a result, she swept the Best Supporting Actress awards at the 38th Blue Dragon Film Awards, the 53rd Baeksang Arts Awards, and the 54th Grand Bell Awards, solidifying her position as a top-notch actress.

Director Kim Jee-woon nicknamed her 'female Song Kang-ho'.

In 2018, She took on the role of Sung Sung-kyung, the Wife of Lee Doo-sam, acted by Song Kang-ho, in 'Drug King' (directed by Woo Min-ho). She won the "Today's Young Artist Award" in the theater category, organized by the Ministry of Culture, Sports and Tourism, in 2018. Ministry of Culture, Sports and Tourism event 2018 Person of Merit for the Development of Culture and Arts. The award ceremony was held on October 24 (Wednesday) at 2:00 pm at the Multi-Project Hall (B1) of the National Museum of Modern and Contemporary Art, Seoul.

In 2019, Kim starred in Kim Yoon-seok's directorial debut film Another Child, alongside Yum Jung-ah, Park Se-jin, and Kim Hye-yoon.

== Filmography ==
=== Film ===
Year	Title	Role	Notes/Ref.
2004	Independent Film Maker's Project; To Abolish The National Security Law		
2006	If You Were Me	Yu-jin	
2006	Hey Man		Short film
2009	Seri & Harr	Yoon-ju	
2010	Haunters	Miss Lee	
2010	Remember O Goddess		Short film
2011	Quick	Team manager	
2011	Officer of the Year	Mapo officer	
2012	The Rumblings	Mi-yeon	Short film
2013	The Spy: Undercover Operation	Situation room staff 2	
2013	The Terror Live	Lee Ji-soo	
2014	My Brilliant Life	Writer Kim	
2014	The Divine Move	Young-sook	
2014	No Tears for the Dead	Mi-jin	
2014	See, Beethoven	Ha-jin	
2015	The Sound of a Flower	Chae-seon's mother	
2015	The Chosen: Forbidden Cave	Soo-hye	
2017	The King	Ahn Hee-yeon	
2017	New Trial	Kang Hyo-jin	
2017	I Can Speak	Geum-joo	
2018	The Spy Gone North	Han Chang-joo's wife	
2018	The Drug King	Seong Sook-kyung	
2019	Another Child	Mi-hee	
2019	The Man Standing Next	Debra Shim	
2021	Escape from Mogadishu	Kom Myung-hee	
2022	Emergency Declaration	Hee-jin	(Note: Screening at the 2021 Cannes Film Festival) (Note: The film has been temporarily postponed due to the COVID-19 outbreak in South Korea and the number of infections is likely to increase. The film was originally scheduled to be released in January 2022, thus temporarily postponing the screening.)

=== Television series ===
Year	Title	Role	Ref.
2016	Marriage Contract	Hwang Joo-yeon	
2022	Through the Darkness	Yoon Tae-goo	

=== Web series ===
Year	Title	Role	Ref.
2023	Vigilante	Choi Mi-ryeo	

=== Television shows ===
Year	Title	Role	Notes	Ref.
2022	100 Days of Invasion of Ukraine Special	Narrator	Document Insight	

== Stage ==
=== Musical ===
Year	Title		Role	Theater	Date	Ref.
Year	English	Korean	Role	Theater	Date	Ref.
2009	Midnight Serenade	한밤의 세레나데	Park Jung-ja	Daehakro Arts Theater Small Theater	July 11 to August 16	
2009	Midnight Serenade	한밤의 세레나데	Park Jung-ja	BNK Busan Bank Cho Eun Theatre 1	Sep 3–Oct 4	
2013	Those Days	그날들	Librarian at the Blue House library	Daehangno Musical Center Grand Theater	April 4–June 30	
2013	Those Days	그날들	Librarian at the Blue House library	Daejeon Arts Center Art Hall	July 5–7	
2013	Those Days	그날들	Librarian at the Blue House library	Daegu Keimyung Art Center	July 19–21.	
2013	Those Days	그날들	Librarian at the Blue House library	Gyeonggi Culture Center Happy Grand Theater Suwon	Aug 2–4	
2013	Those Days	그날들	Librarian at the Blue House library	Centum City Sohyang Theater Lotte Card Hall Busan	Aug 15–18	
2014–2015	Those Days	그날들	Librarian at the Blue House library	Daehangno Musical Center Grand Theater	Oct 21–Jan 18	
2015	Moonlight Fairy and Girl	달빛요정과 소녀		Chungmu Art Hall Small Theater Blue	Jan 20–Feb 8	
2015	Those Days	그날들	Librarian at the Blue House library	Centum City Sohyang Theater Lotte Card Hall Busan	April 17–19	
2015	Those Days	그날들	Librarian at the Blue House library	Daejeon Arts Center Art Hall	April 24–26	
2015	Moonlight Fairy and Girl	달빛요정과 소녀		Art One Theater 1	May 8–31.	

=== Theater ===
Theaters' performances
Year	Title		Role	Theater	Date	Ref.
Year	English	Korean	Role	Theater	Date	Ref.
2008	Boot Rasa	시동라사	Kang Jeong-ok	Daehang-ro Guerrilla Theatre	Oct 19–25	
2009	Yi Sang Counts to Thirteen	이상 열 셋까지 세다	green, gold	Samil Warehouse Theatre	May 1–June 28	
2009–2010	I'm going to get married in May	오월엔 결혼할꺼야	Choi Se-yeon (Teacher)	JTN Art Hall 2	Sep 22–Feb 28	
2010	Yang Deok-won Story	양덕원 이야기	Kwan-woo	Daehangno Art One Theater Hall 3 Chaimu Theater	May 7 to Jul 4	
2010	Road to Santiago	산티아고 가는 길	Jin	Yeonwoo Small Theater	Nov 19–Dec 5	
2011	The Seagull	갈매기	Masha	Myeongdong Arts Theater	April 19–May 8	
2011	Kite	연	Shin Jae-soon	Daehangno Cultural Space Feeling 2	Sep 16–Oct 16	
2011	Kite	연	Shin Jae-soon	Sarasae Theater in Aram Nuri, Goyang	Oct 20–26.	
2012	There	거기	Kim Jeong	Daehangno Sangmyung Art Hall	Jan 7 to Feb 23	
2012	Pungchan Homeless	풍찬노숙	that kid	Namsan Arts Center Drama Center	Jan 18–Feb 12	
2012	The song of spring flows in the sea	봄의 노래는 바다에 흐르고		Namsan Arts Center Drama Center	June 12–July 1	
2012–2013	There	거기	Kim Jeong	Art One Theater 3	Sep 7–Feb 24	
2014	The Cosmonaut's Last Message to the Woman He Once Loved in the Former Soviet Union	한때 사랑했던 여자에게 보내는 구소련 우주비행사의 마지막 메시지	Natasha	Myeongdeong Arts Theater	04.16–05.11	
2014	The Height of The Multiple	배수의 고도	Shoko Ando	Doosan Art Center Space 111	June 10–July 5	
2014	Theatre's Heated Battle 5 - The Pride	연극열전5 - 프라이드	Sylvia	Art One Theater Hall 2	Aug 16–Nov 9	
2015	Late Autumn	만추	Anna	Art One Theater 1	Oct 10–Nov 08	
2015	Love	러브	Tanya	Arko Arts Theater Small Theater	Sep 17–26	
2015	Twenty Twenty Chaimu - Tail Cotton Story	스물스물 차이무 - 꼬리솜 이야기	Ma Gapji	JTN Art Hall 2	November 6 to 29	
2015–2016	Twenty Twenty Chaimu - Tail Cotton Story	스물스물 차이무 - 꼬리솜 이야기	Jin-gyeong	JTN Art Hall 2	Dec 4 to Jan 3	
2015–2016	One Fine Day	원파인데이	Jin-gyeong	JTN Art Hall 2	Dec 4 to Jan 3	
2016	Crescendo Palace	크레센도궁전	Female	CJ AZIT	May 24–June 5	
2016	One Fine Day	원파인데이	Jin-gyeong	COEX New Building 4F Grand Conference Room (Room 401)	May 8	
2016	Collected Stories	단편소설집	Lisa Morrison	Daehakro Arts Theater Small Theater	Aug 12–21	
2016	Closer	클로저	Anna	Yegreen Theater	September 6 to November 13, 2016	
2017	L'Appartement	라빠르트망	Alice	LG Art Center	Oct 18–Nov 05	
2018	Doosan Humanities Theater 2018 Altruism - Nassim	두산인문극장 2018 이타주의자 - 낫심		Doosan Art Center Space111	April 10–29	
2018	Doosan Humanities Theater 2018 Altruism - Mourner	두산인문극장 2018 이타주의자 - 애도하는 사람	Nagi Yukiyo	Doosan Art Center Space111	June 12–July 7	
2019	Official Selection of the 40th Seoul Theatre Festival - Short Stories	제40회 서울연극제 단편소설집		Daehak-ro SH Art Hall	May 3–12	
2021	In the Garden We Loved	우리가 사랑했던 정원에서	Narrator	Sejong Arts Center S Theater	June 22 to July 4	
2024	Macbeth	맥베스	Lady Macbeth	National Theater's Haeoreum Theater	July 13 to August 18	

== Accolades ==
=== Awards and nominations ===
Name of the award ceremony, year presented, category, nominee of the award, and the result of the nomination
Award ceremony	Year	Category	Nominee / Work	Result	Ref.
Asian Film Awards	2023	Best Supporting Actress	Emergency Declaration	Won	
Baeksang Arts Awards	2017	Best Supporting Actress – Film	The King	Won	
Baeksang Arts Awards	2020	Best Actress – Film	Another Child	Nominated	
Baeksang Arts Awards	2022	Best Supporting Actress – Film	Escape from Mogadishu	Nominated	
Blue Dragon Film Awards	2017	Best Supporting Actress	The King	Won	
Blue Dragon Film Awards	2022	Best Supporting Actress	Emergency Declaration	Nominated	
Buil Film Awards	2017	Best Supporting Actress	The King	Nominated	
Buil Film Awards	2020	Best Supporting Actress	The Man Standing Next	Nominated	
Buil Film Awards	2022	Best Supporting Actress	Emergency Declaration	Nominated	
Chunsa Film Art Awards	2020	Best Supporting Actress	The Man Standing Next	Nominated	
Chunsa Film Art Awards	2022	Best Supporting Actress	Escape from Mogadishu	Nominated	
Grand Bell Awards	2017	Best Supporting Actress	The King	Won	
Grand Bell Awards	2020	Best Supporting Actress	Another Child	Nominated	
KOFRA Film Awards	2018	Best Supporting Actress	The King	Won	
Korean Film Producers Association Awards	2017	Best Supporting Actress	The King	Won	
SBS Drama Awards	2022	Top Excellence Award, Actress in a Miniseries Genre/Fantasy Drama	Through the Darkness	Nominated	
SBS Drama Awards	2022	Best Supporting Team	Through the Darkness	Nominated	
The Seoul Awards	2017	Best Supporting Actress	New Trial	Nominated	

=== State honors ===
List of State Honour
Country	Award Ceremony	Year	Honor	Ref.
South Korea	2018 Person of Merit for the Development of Culture and Arts (Note: Person of Merit for the Development of Culture and Arts hosted annually by Ministry of Culture, Sports and Tourism. Since 1993, the Ministry of Culture has selected promising young artists in their 20s and 30s by field and awarded the 'Today's Young Artist Award'. The winners receive a prize of 5 million won as a prize and a plaque from the Minister of Culture.)	2018	Today's Young Artist Award in Theater	

=== Listicles ===
Name of publisher, year listed, name of listicle, and placement
Publisher	Year	Listicle	Placement	Ref.
Korean Film Council	2021	Korean Actors 200 (Note: The list introduces the 200 actors that best represent the present and future of Korean cinema to the people in the film industry all over the world.)	Placed	
