= Emergency Declaration (film) =

2021 South Korean disaster-action film

- Theatrical release poster
- Hangul: 비상선언
- Hanja: 非常宣言
- RR: Bisang seoneon
- MR: Pisang sŏnŏn
- Directed by: Han Jae-rim
- Written by: Han Jae-rim
- Produced by: Han Jae-rim; Baek Chang-joo; Eum Zoo-young
- Starring: Song Kang-ho; Lee Byung-hun; Jeon Do-yeon; Kim Nam-gil; Yim Si-wan; Kim So-jin; Park Hae-joon
- Cinematography: Lee Mo-gae: Park Jong-Chul
- Edited by: Kim Woo-Hyun; Lee Kang-il; Han Jae-rim
- Music by: Lee Byung-woo
- Production companies: Magnum Nine Co., Ltd.; Showbox Co., Ltd.
- Distributed by: Showbox
- Release dates: July 16, 2021 (Cannes); August 3, 2022 (South Korea)
- Running time: 147 minutes
- Country: South Korea
- Language: Korean
- Budget: ₩26 billion ($19 million)
- Box office: $21.4 million

Emergency Declaration (Korean: 비상선언; RR: Bisang seoneon) is a 2021 South Korean disaster film written and directed by Han Jae-rim, starring Song Kang-ho, Lee Byung-hun, Jeon Do-yeon, Kim Nam-gil, Yim Si-wan, Kim So-jin and Park Hae-joon. Filming restarted on September 12, 2020, after a postponement due to the COVID-19 resurgence in August 2020 and wrapped on October 24, 2020.

The film premiered out of competition at the 74th Cannes Film Festival on July 16, 2021, before being released theatrically in South Korea on August 3, 2022. It was screened in various formats, including on a 4DX screen combining 4DX and ScreenX in addition to IMAX.

== Plot ==
At Incheon International Airport, a man named Jin-seok suspiciously questions a staff member about the most popular flights, and after being denied an answer, insults the staff and heads to the bathroom. There, he surgically inserts a cylindrical object into his armpit. Meanwhile, Jae-hyuk and his daughter Soo-min are also at the airport. Jin-seok later approaches them with inappropriate questions, prompting Jae-hyuk to protect his daughter and walk away. Unbeknownst to them, Jin-seok has smuggled a virus onboard their flight by hiding it inside an asthma inhaler.

Detective In-ho, investigating a viral terror threat video, traces the video back to Jin-seok and searches his home, where he finds evidence of animal testing and a decomposing corpse. Meanwhile, Jin-seok releases the virus in the airplane bathroom. A different passenger enters the contaminated restroom and later collapses from severe hemorrhaging. Jae-hyuk sees a terror threat video mid-flight and identifies Jin-seok as the perpetrator. Suspicion rises when Soo-min reveals that Jin-seok threatened to kill everyone on the plane.

Panic spreads as passengers begin showing symptoms. Jin-seok is confronted and restrained after releasing more of the virus. In the cockpit, co-pilot Hyun-soo and flight attendant Hee-jin notify the captain, but the captain succumbs to the infection, causing the plane to dive uncontrollably. Jae-hyuk, a former pilot who left the profession due to trauma from a past emergency landing, steps in and helps stabilize the aircraft alongside Hyun-soo. On the ground, In-ho pursues Jin-seok's accomplice and uncovers the virus' origin: a mutated hemorrhagic virus from the Middle East, tied to Jin-seok's dismissal by a pharmaceutical company.

As more passengers show symptoms, the U.S. and Japan deny the plane's landing request. In South Korea, public panic grows, with protests and online comments urging the government not to allow the infected flight to land. The passengers on board, realizing the severity of the outbreak, begin accepting their fate. Soo-min and others volunteer not to disembark, fearing they may cause harm to people on the ground. Jae-hyuk announces that the plane will not attempt to land.

At the last moment, an experimental antiviral drug given to In-ho shows promising results, and the vaccine's effectiveness is confirmed. The flight is granted emergency clearance to land but is low on fuel. Jae-hyuk diverts the plane to a military airstrip and narrowly avoids crashing. In the aftermath, the Minister of Land resigns, Jin-seok's sociopathy is confirmed, and the surviving passengers reunite at a celebration.

== Cast ==
- Song Kang-ho as Gu In-ho
- Lee Byung-hun as Park Jae-hyuk
- Jeon Do-yeon as Kim Sook-hee
- Kim Nam-gil as Choi Hyun-soo
- Yim Si-wan as Ryu Jin-seok
- Kim So-jin as Kim Hee-jin
- Park Hae-joon as Park Tae-su
- Woo Mi-hwa as Hye-yoon
- Hyun Bong-sik as Park Yoon-chul
- Moon Sook as Doctor Han
- Seol In-ah as Tae-eun
- Kwon Han-sol as Min-jung
- Kim Bo-min as Soo-min
- Kim Gook-hee as Mi-ryang
- Lee Yul-eum as Park Shi-young
- Jang Seo-yeon as Flight attendant
- Jeon Su-ji as Assistant Secretary Oh
- Lee Soo-mi as Hye-yoon's friend
- Shin Soo-yeon as High School student

== Production ==
On August 29, 2019, Showbox confirmed that Song Kang-ho and Lee Byung-hun have agreed to appear in director Han Jae-rim's next film Emergency Declaration. On 30 March 2020, it was reported that the film has been put on hold due to the outbreak of COVID-19. In May 2020, the cast of the film was finalized as Song Kang-ho, Lee Byung-hun, Jeon Do-yeon, Kim Nam-gil, Yim Si-wan, Kim So-jin and Park Hae-joon. Filming began in the same month.

The airplane set was made by airlifting an entire scrapped plane from the United States. The motif of the early model of the Boeing 777, was used to create a set. With the help of a gimbal with a diameter of 7 meters and a length of 12 meters, it was made to rotate 360-degrees.

On 31 August 2020, the distributors of the film Showbox announced that filming had stopped due to the resurgence of COVID-19. Filming restarted on September 12, 2020, and wrapped on October 24, 2020. The director said, "As a producer and a director, I am very satisfied with the fact that everyone finished shooting well." On post production, the director Han Jae-rim said about the filming and performance, "The set is also a set, but the part to watch out for in the airplane scene is the outstanding performance of the actors. This is what I really want to show off".

== Release ==
Emergency Declaration was invited to the out of competition section of the 74th Cannes Film Festival to be held from 6 to 17 July 2021 and had its world premiere on July 16. It was slated to release theatrically in January 2022, but due to a new wave of the COVID-19 pandemic its release was delayed. It was finally released theatrically in South Korea on August 3, 2022 and in the United States on August 12, 2022. The film was released in Singapore, Thailand, Hong Kong, and Malaysia on August 4, and was invited to the Orbita section, the competition section at the 55th Sitges Film Festival to be held from October 6 to October 16, 2022.

=== Home media ===
The film will be released on Coupang Play on September 7, 2022.

== Reception ==
=== Box office ===
The film was released on August 3 on 1776 screens. It opened at number 1 at the Korean box office with 336,751 viewers. It logged one million viewers on the fourth day of its release after topping the box office for two days. It took 18 days for the film to surpass 2 million viewers.

As of September 26, 2022, it was the 8th highest-grossing Korean film of 2022 with a gross of US$14.7 million and 2.1 million admissions according to the Korean Film Council. With a production cost of about ₩30 million, the film required about 5.2 million (South Korean) admissions to cross the break-even point. At the end of August, the film was sold for ₩13 billion and released exclusively on Coupang Play. By skipping VOD service, the film was able to recover its production costs thanks to the down payment.

=== Critical response ===
The review aggregator website Rotten Tomatoes reported a 64% approval rating, based on 33 reviews with an average rating of 5.5/10.

Im Soo-yeon of Cine21, stated that the film "resembles director Bong Joon-ho's The Host rather than a Hollywood movie about hijacking or aviation disasters". Concluding, Im wrote, "This is a new film from director Han Jae-rim, who directed Contemplation and The King." Lee Marshall reviewing the film for Screen Daily was critical of the timing of the film. He appreciated the car chase sequence filmed through the windscreen of the vehicle in pursuit. Concluding Lee wrote, ".... but the film remains as a series of sketches that are all but erased by the film’s trite and inauthentic ending." Peter Debruge of Variety appreciating the film wrote, "From a storytelling perspective, seeing what Han can do with the interior of a plane — and a whole lot of CGI — is downright inspirational." Jared Mobarak writing in The Film Stage graded the film as B− and wrote, "The plane is in danger. It can't land until a plan to alleviate that danger is made on the ground. Everything that occurs reinforces those two truths. Even so, it's never boring." Laura Sirikul of The Nerds of Color rated the film 3.5/5 and praised, the production design, cinematography, and CGI on the plane interior as "incredible". Sirikul stated, "The film was filled with so many twists and turns that you don’t really notice the long duration. It also amps up the anxiety and stakes by adding more and more surprises."

Therese Lacson writing in Collider graded the film as C+ and wrote, "With so much holding it down, it feels impossible for Emergency Declaration to take flight, and it lives in the shadow of disaster films that capitalize on the hallmarks of its genre, rather than trying to do too much at the same time."

=== Accolades ===
Name of the award ceremony, year presented, category, nominee of the award, and the result of the nomination
| Award ceremony | Year | Category | Nominee(s) | Result | Ref. |
|---|---|---|---|---|---|
| Asian Film Awards | 2023 | Best Supporting Actor | Yim Si-wan | Nominated | |
| Asian Film Awards | 2023 | Best Supporting Actress | Kim So-jin | Won | |
| Baeksang Arts Awards | 2023 | Best Supporting Actor – Film | Yim Si-wan | Nominated | |
| Blue Dragon Film Awards | 2022 | Best Actor | Lee Byung-hun | Nominated | |
| Blue Dragon Film Awards | 2022 | Best Director | Han Jae-rim | Nominated | |
| Blue Dragon Film Awards | 2022 | Best Supporting Actor | Yim Si-wan | Nominated | |
| Blue Dragon Film Awards | 2022 | Best Supporting Actress | Kim So-jin | Nominated | |
| Blue Dragon Film Awards | 2022 | Technical Award | Ryu Young-jae, Hwang Hyo-kyun, Hong Jeong-ho | Nominated | |
| Buil Film Awards | 2022 | Best Supporting Actor | Yim Si-wan | Won | |
| Buil Film Awards | 2022 | Best Actress | Jeon Do-yeon | Nominated | |
| Buil Film Awards | 2022 | Best Film | Emergency Declaration | Nominated | |
| Buil Film Awards | 2022 | Best Supporting Actress | Kim So-jin | Nominated | |
| Grand Bell Awards | 2022 | Best Actor | Lee Byung-hun | Nominated | |
| Grand Bell Awards | 2022 | Best Art Direction | Lee Mok-won | Nominated | |
| Grand Bell Awards | 2022 | Best Cinematography | Lee Mo-gae, Park Jong-Chul | Nominated | |
| Grand Bell Awards | 2022 | Best Film Editing | Kim Woo-hyun, Lee Kang-il | Nominated | |
| Grand Bell Awards | 2022 | Best Lighting | Lee Seong-hwan | Nominated | |
| Grand Bell Awards | 2022 | Best Music | Lee Byung-woo, Ji Ji-hoon | Nominated | |
| Grand Bell Awards | 2022 | Best Supporting Actor | Yim Si-wan | Nominated | |
| Korean Association of Film Critics Awards | 2022 | Korean Association of Film 10 selections of Kim Hyun-seung | Emergency Declaration | Won | |
| Korean Film Producers Association Award | 2022 | Best Supporting Actor | Yim Si-wan | Won | |
| London Asian Film Festival | 2022 | Buldak Rising Star Award | Yim Si-wan | Won | |
