= The Face Reader =

2013 South Korean film directed by Han Jae-rim

- Film poster
- Hangul: 관상
- Hanja: 觀相
- RR: Gwansang
- MR: Kwansang
- Directed by: Han Jae-rim
- Written by: Kim Dong-hyuk
- Produced by: Kim Woo-jae; Yu Jeong-hun; Ju Pil-ho
- Starring: Song Kang-ho; Lee Jung-jae; Baek Yoon-sik; Jo Jung-suk; Lee Jong-suk; Kim Hye-soo
- Cinematography: Go Nak-seon
- Edited by: Kim Chang-ju
- Music by: Lee Byung-woo
- Distributed by: Showbox Mediaplex
- Release date: September 11, 2013
- Running time: 139 minutes
- Country: South Korea
- Language: Korean
- Box office: US$61 million

The Face Reader (Korean: 관상; RR: Gwansang; lit. 'Physiognomy') is a 2013 South Korean period action drama film starring Song Kang-ho as the son of a disgraced noble family who goes around Joseon as a gwansang expert. He is able to assess the personality, mental state and habits of a person by looking at their face. His talents bring him to the royal courts where he becomes involved in a power struggle between Grand Prince Suyang and general Kim Jong-seo, a high-ranking loyalist to King Munjong. It is the first installment of the Jupiter Film's three-part film project on the Korean fortune-telling traditions and was followed by two sequels, The Princess and the Matchmaker and Feng Shui in 2018.

The Face Reader became one of the highest-grossing films in South Korea in 2013, with 9.1 million admissions. It won six awards at the 50th Grand Bell Awards, including Best Film, Best Director for Han Jae-rim, and Best Actor for Song Kang-ho.

== Plot ==
Nae-gyeong, the most skillful face reader in the Joseon dynasty, was living in seclusion when he was offered a lucrative partnership by Yeon-hong, a gisaeng. Nae-gyeong accepts the proposal to read the faces of Yeon-hong's guests only to get involved in a murder case. With his face reading skills, Nae-gyeong successfully identifies the murderer and his skills are soon acknowledged by King Munjong who orders him to identify the potential traitors who threaten his reign. However, after the unexpected death of Munjong, Nae-gyeong is courted by Grand Prince Suyang who yearns to become King himself by killing the young successor Danjong. Nae-gyeong decides to keep his loyalty to the late King and help Kim Jong-seo protect the young King which forces him into the biggest power struggle in the history of the Joseon dynasty.

== Cast ==
- Song Kang-ho as Nae-gyeong
- Lee Jung-jae as Grand Prince Suyang
- Baek Yoon-sik as Kim Jong-seo
- Jo Jung-suk as Paeng-heon, Nae-gyeong's brother-in-law and assistant
- Lee Jong-suk as Jin-hyeong, Nae-gyeong's son
- Kim Hye-soo as Yeon-hong
- Kim Eui-sung as Han Myung-hoi
- Jung Gyu-soo as Park Cheom-ji
- Chae Sang-woo as Danjong
- Lee Yoon-geon as Jo Sang-yong
- Lee Do-yeop as Kim Seung-kyu
- Yoo Sang-jae as Hong Yun-seong
- Lee Ae-rin as Hong-dan
- Lee Yong-gwan as Yang-jeong
- Yoon Kyung-ho as Im-woon
- Seo Hyun-woo as Jin-moo
- Lee Chang-jik as Hwangbo In
- Kim Tae-woo as King Munjong
- Ko Chang-seok as His Excellency Choi
- Kim Kang-hyeon as Suspect 3

== Production ==
Kim Dong-hyuk's screenplay won the grand prize at the 2010 Korean Scenario Contest held by the Korean Film Council.

== Awards and nominations ==
Year	Award	Category	Recipient	Result
2013	50th Grand Bell Awards	Best Film	The Face Reader	Won
2013	50th Grand Bell Awards	Best Director	Han Jae-rim	Won
2013	50th Grand Bell Awards	Best Actor	Song Kang-ho	Won
2013	50th Grand Bell Awards	Best Actor	Lee Jung-jae	Nominated
2013	50th Grand Bell Awards	Popularity Award	Lee Jung-jae	Won
2013	50th Grand Bell Awards	Best Supporting Actor	Jo Jung-suk	Won
2013	50th Grand Bell Awards	Best Supporting Actor	Baek Yoon-sik	Nominated
2013	50th Grand Bell Awards	Best Screenplay	Kim Dong-hyuk	Nominated
2013	50th Grand Bell Awards	Best Cinematography	Go Nak-seon	Nominated
2013	50th Grand Bell Awards	Best Editing	Kim Chang-ju	Nominated
2013	50th Grand Bell Awards	Best Art Direction	Lee Ha-jun	Nominated
2013	50th Grand Bell Awards	Best Lighting	Shin Kyung-man, Lee Cheol-oh	Nominated
2013	50th Grand Bell Awards	Best Music	Lee Byung-woo	Nominated
2013	50th Grand Bell Awards	Best Costume Design	Shim Hyun-sub	Won
2013	50th Grand Bell Awards	Technical Award	Kwak Tae-yong, Hwang Hyo-kyun (Special Make-up)	Nominated
2013	50th Grand Bell Awards	Technical Award	Im Dae-ji, Choi Tae-young (Sound)	Nominated
2013	34th Blue Dragon Film Awards	Best Film	The Face Reader	Nominated
2013	34th Blue Dragon Film Awards	Best Director	Han Jae-rim	Nominated
2013	34th Blue Dragon Film Awards	Best Actor	Song Kang-ho	Nominated
2013	34th Blue Dragon Film Awards	Best Supporting Actor	Lee Jung-jae	Won
2013	34th Blue Dragon Film Awards	Best Supporting Actor	Jo Jung-suk	Nominated
2013	34th Blue Dragon Film Awards	Best Supporting Actress	Kim Hye-soo	Nominated
2013	34th Blue Dragon Film Awards	Best Screenplay	Kim Dong-hyuk	Nominated
2013	34th Blue Dragon Film Awards	Best Cinematography	Go Nak-seon	Nominated
2013	34th Blue Dragon Film Awards	Best Art Direction	Lee Ha-jun	Nominated
2013	34th Blue Dragon Film Awards	Best Lighting	Shin Kyung-man, Lee Cheol-oh	Nominated
2013	33rd Korean Association of Film Critics Awards	Best Actor	Song Kang-ho	Won
2013	33rd Korean Association of Film Critics Awards	Best Actor	Lee Jung-jae	Nominated
2013	33rd Korean Association of Film Critics Awards	Best Supporting Actor	Jo Jung-suk	Won
2013	33rd Korean Association of Film Critics Awards	Best Music	Lee Byung-woo	Won
2013	33rd Korean Association of Film Critics Awards	CJ CGV Star Award	Lee Jung-jae	Won
2014	5th KOFRA Film Awards	Best Supporting Actor	Lee Jung-jae	Won
2014	9th Max Movie Awards	Best Actress	Kim Hye-soo	Nominated
2014	9th Max Movie Awards	Best Supporting Actor	Lee Jung-jae	Nominated
2014	9th Max Movie Awards	Best Supporting Actor	Jo Jung-suk	Nominated
2014	9th Max Movie Awards	Best Supporting Actress	Kim Hye-soo	Nominated
2014	9th Max Movie Awards	Best Poster	The Face Reader	Won
2014	9th Max Movie Awards	Best Preview	The Face Reader	Nominated
2014	19th Chunsa Film Art Awards	Best Director	Han Jae-rim	Nominated
2014	19th Chunsa Film Art Awards	Best Actor	Lee Jung-jae	Nominated
2014	19th Chunsa Film Art Awards	Best Screenplay	Kim Dong-hyuk	Nominated
2014	8th Asian Film Awards	Best Costume Design	Shim Hyun-sub	Nominated
2014	50th Baeksang Arts Awards	Best Film	The Face Reader	Nominated
2014	50th Baeksang Arts Awards	Best Supporting Actor	Lee Jung-jae	Won
2014	50th Baeksang Arts Awards	Best Supporting Actor	Kim Eui-sung	Nominated
2014	23rd Buil Film Awards	Best Supporting Actor	Lee Jung-jae	Nominated
2014	23rd Buil Film Awards	Best Art Direction	Lee Ha-jun	Nominated
