= List of Tramps Like Us characters =

This is a list of characters from Tramps Like Us (Kimi wa Petto).

== Main characters ==
- Sumire Iwaya (巌谷 澄麗, Iwaya Sumire) (Portrayed by: Koyuki, Kim Ha-neul in the 2011 Korean film, Noriko Iriyama in the 2017 remake)

Sumire Iwaya is a hard-working and highly successful journalist, who is demoted to the lifestyle section after punching her boss when he sexually harasses her. Ogawa feels that Sumire's "stubborn" personality at the beginning stems from Ogawa's own experience as a new manga artist. Sumire enjoys both her job and her romance with Hasumi, unlike depictions of female characters in the 1980s and 1990s. At the end of the manga, she notices that she has fallen in love with Momo and in the last chapter, she marries him.

- Momo (モモ), or Takeshi Gouda (合田 武志, Gōda Takeshi) (Portrayed by: Jun Matsumoto, Jang Keun-suk in the 2011 Korean film, Jun Shison in the 2017 remake)

A young dancer who Sumire finds and takes in as her pet. Initially, Ogawa had intended to make him much more animal-like in his mannerisms. He is said to represent a "comfortable, cooperative, and compatible" sort of a man.

- Shigehito Hasumi (蓮實 滋人, Hasumi Shigehito) (Portrayed by: Seiichi Tanabe, Ryu Tae-joon in the 2011 Korean film, Terunosuke Takezai in the 2017 remake)

Hasumi is a successful journalist who went to university with Sumire. He is said to represent the "three highs" (tall, high income, well-educated) kind of a man that Japanese women have stereotypically desired.

== Other characters ==
- Yuri Shirotae (白妙 ユリ, Shirotae Yuri) (Portrayed by: Sarina Suzuki, Kayo Noro in the 2017 remake)

Sumire's childhood friend, a housewife to a pilot and mother of Ran.

- Rumi Shibusawa (澁澤ルミ, Shibusawa Rumi) (Portrayed by: Satomi Ishihara, Yuumi Shida in the 2017 remake)

Momo's ex-girlfriend, a dancer.

- Shiori Fukushima (福島 紫織, Fukushima Shiroi) (Portrayed by: Wakana Sakai, Yurina Yanagi in the 2017 remake)

A dental assistant determined to seduce and marry Hasumi-senpai. In the drama adaptation, she is an office worker.

- Emma Owen and Hugh Oswald

Two American journalists who work under Sumire.

- Satoshi Asano (Portrayed by: Kyozo Nagatsuka)

A company therapist in the TV series. He owns a long-haired chihuahua and talks with Sumire about pets a lot. He changes the dog's name every day.

- Junpei Horibei (Portrayed by: Eita)

Takeshi (Momo)'s friend who also does ballet. In the TV series he has an unrequited love for Rumi.

- Mayumi Haruki (Portrayed by: Misa Uehara)

One of Sumire's co-workers.

- Yuuta Ishida (Portrayed by: Ryuta Sato)

One of Sumire's co-workers.

- Ooishi Minori

Sumire's landlord in the TV drama, he is a very cheery person.

- Mrs. Kusunoki

One of Sumire's neighbours in the TV drama. Very noisy.

- Edmond Sukenari

One of Sumire's co-workers. He is an otaku who collects figurines. His mother was American, but she died when he was young. He wears glasses, and everyone is transfixed by how attractive he is when he takes them off. He doesn't realise this. He admires Sumire.

- Shinobu

Sumire's older sister. She is very conventional and supportive of her grandfather. She practices a tough love on her younger sisters. She is married with children.

- Akane

Sumire's younger sister. She is rebellious, smokes, and founded a biker gang.
