= Jang Keun-suk discography =

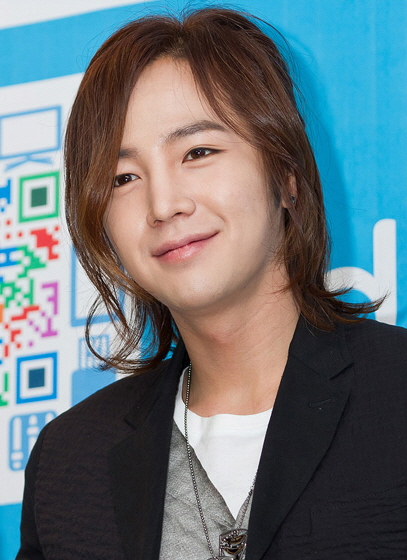
- Studio albums: 11
- Soundtrack albums: 1
- Singles: 9

South Korean actor Jang Keun-suk released several Japanese language studio albums, as well as several original soundtracks for dramas and films he starred in.

== Studio albums ==
Title	Album details	Peak chart positions	Sales
Title	Album details	JPN	Sales
Just Crazy	Released: May 30, 2012; Label: Pony Canyon, TreeJ Entertainment; Format: CD, digital download	1	JPN: 88,009
Nature Boy	Released: May 29, 2013; Label: Pony Canyon, TreeJ Entertainment; Format: CD, digital download	2	JPN: 56,956
Monochrome	Released: February 25, 2015; Label: Pony Canyon, TreeJ Entertainment; Format: CD, digital download	3	JPN: 32,573
Voyage	Released: August 9, 2017; Label: Universal J, TreeJ Entertainment; Format: CD, digital download	2	JPN: 37,034
Blooming	Released: March 30, 2022; Label: Universal J, TreeJ Entertainment; Format: CD, digital download	7	JPN: 16,508
Day Dream	Released: February 14, 2024; Label: Universal J, TreeJ Entertainment; Format: CD, digital download	10	JPN: 11,278
As Team H (Jang Keun-suk and Big Brother)
Lounge H (The First Impression)	Released: March 21, 2012; Label: Pony Canyon, TreeJ Entertainment; Format: CD, digital download	3	
I Just Want to Have Fun	Released: March 27, 2013; Label: Pony Canyon, TreeJ Entertainment; Format: CD, digital download	6	JPN: 28,095
Driving to the Highway	Released: July 16, 2014; Label: Pony Canyon, TreeJ Entertainment; Format: CD, digital download	5	JPN: 22,917
Monologue	Released: October 12, 2016; Label: Universal J, TreeJ Entertainment; Format: CD, digital download	3	JPN: 19,169
Mature	Released: September 5, 2018; Label: Universal J, TreeJ Entertainment; Format: CD, digital download	4	JPN: 22,680

== Soundtrack albums ==
Title	Single details	Peak chart positions	Sales
Title	Single details	KOR	Sales
You're Beautiful OST (Jang Keun-suk Special)	Released: December 22, 2011; Label: Sony Music; Formats: CD, digital download	1	KOR: 14,442

== Singles ==
Title	Single details	Peak chart positions		Sales
Title	Single details	JPN	KOR	Sales
"Let Me Cry"	Released: April 27, 2011; Label: Pony Canyon, TreeJ Entertainment; Formats: CD, digital download	1	10	JPN: 119,149; KOR: 6,259
"Darling Darling / Kawaita Kiss" (Darling Darling / 渇いたKiss)	Released: August 10, 2016; Label: Universal J, TreeJ Entertainment; Formats: CD, digital download	5	—	JPN: 29,438
"Endless Summer / Going Crazy"	Released: September 14, 2016; Label: Universal J, TreeJ Entertainment; Formats: CD, digital download	3	—	JPN: 29,438
"Dakishimetai" (抱きしめたい)	Released: December 14, 2016; Label: Universal J, TreeJ Entertainment; Formats: CD, digital download	2	—	JPN: 33,670
"Emotion"	Released: May 26, 2021; Label: Universal; Formats: CD, digital download	4	—	
"Amagoi" (雨恋)	Released: August 4, 2021; Label: Universal; Formats: CD, digital download	4	—	
"Day By Day"	Released: September 15, 2021; Label: Universal; Formats: CD, digital download	3	—	
"Beautiful"	Released: August 31, 2022; Label: Universal; Formats: CD, digital download	3	—	
"Curtain Call"	Released: April 9, 2025; Label: Universal; Formats: CD, digital download	3	—	JPN: 14,935
As Team H (Jang Keun-suk and Big Brother)
"Take Me"	Released: June 25, 2014; Label: Pony Canyon, TreeJ Entertainment; Format: CD, digital download	5	—	JPN: 18,561

== Soundtrack appearances ==
Title	Year	Album
"Let's Get Down" (with Joosuc)	2004	Nonstop 4 OST
"Can You Hear Me Part 2" (들리나요 Part 2)	2008	Beethoven Virus OST
"Without Words" (말도없이)	2009	You're Beautiful OST
"Good Bye"	2009	You're Beautiful OST
"What Should I Do?" (어떡하죠)	2009	You're Beautiful OST
"Take Care, My Bus!" (부탁해, My Bus!)	2010	Marry Me, Mary! OST
"My Precious"	2010	Marry Me, Mary! OST
"Hello Hello"	2010	Marry Me, Mary! OST
"I Will Promise You"	2010	Marry Me, Mary! OST
"Bbuing Bbuing: You're My Pet Song" (너는 펫 키워봐쏭) (with Kim Ha-neul)	2011	You're My Pet OST
"I Only Look at You" (너만 보여) (with Kim Ha-neul)	2011	You're My Pet OST
"Oh My Lady" (with Choi Sang-mi)	2011	You're My Pet OST
"Mandy"	2011	You're My Pet OST
"Love Rain" (사랑비)	2012	Love Rain OST

== Music video ==
Year	Title	Artist	Notes
	"Black Engine"	Himself	Debut Single
	"We Can Make It"	Tim Hwang and Son Hoyoung	
2009	"Toucholic"	Himself	
2009	"Just Drag"	Himself	
2010	"Magic Drag"	Jang Keun-suk feat. Hyolyn	
2011	"Let Me Cry"	Himself	
2012	"Crazy Crazy Crazy"	Himself	
2012	"Can't Stop"	Team H	
2012	"Abracadabra"	Himself	
2012	"Stay"	Himself	
2013	"Nature Boy"	Himself	
2013	"I See You (ICU)"	Jang Keun-suk and Park Min-young	
2013	"I Just Wanna Have Fun"	Team H	
2013	"Beautiful Change"	Team H	
2013	"Feel The Beat"	Team H	directed by Zanybros
2013	"What is Your Name?"	Team H	
2014	"Dream Journey in Jeju"	Jang Keun-suk and Park Shin-hye	
2014	"Raining on the Dance Floor"	Team H	Driving to the Highway
2014	"Take Me"	Team H	Driving to the Highway
2015	"Hidamari"	Himself	Monochrome
2016	"Darling Darling "	Himself	
2016	"Endless Summer "	Himself	
2016	"Like A Zombie"	Team H	Monologue
2016	"I Want To Hug You"	Himself	
2017	"Voyage"	Himself	Voyage album
