= Kadhalum Kadandhu Pogum =

2016 Indian film by Nalan Kumarasamy

- Theatrical release poster
- Directed by: Nalan Kumarasamy
- Screenplay by: Nalan Kumarasamy
- Based on: My Dear Desperado by Kim Kwang-sik
- Produced by: C. V. Kumar; K. E. Gnanavel Raja
- Starring: Vijay Sethupathi; Madonna Sebastian
- Cinematography: Dinesh B. Krishnan
- Edited by: Leo John Paul
- Music by: Santhosh Narayanan
- Production companies: Studio Green; Thirukumaran Entertainment
- Distributed by: Abi & Abi Pictures
- Release date: 11 March 2016
- Running time: 137 minutes
- Country: India
- Language: Tamil

Kadhalum Kadanthu Pogum (transl. Love too shall pass) is a 2016 Indian Tamil-language romantic comedy film written and directed by Nalan Kumarasamy. Produced by C. V. Kumar of Thirukumaran Entertainment and K. E. Gnanavel Raja of Studio Green, the film stars Vijay Sethupathi and Madonna Sebastian. A remake of the 2010 South Korean film My Dear Desperado, it focuses on a rowdy and an IT professional who share a special bond when they live as neighbours.

Nalan initially planned to make a black comedy; however as several other films were being released in the same genre after the release of his Soodhu Kavvum (2013), he rewrote the entire script from scratch. Principal photography began in April 2015 and ended that July, with the film being set mostly in Chennai. The music is composed by Santhosh Narayanan, with Dinesh B. Krishnan and Leo John Paul serving as the cinematographer and editor respectively. The film's title was not revealed until two months after production ended.

Kadhalum Kadanthu Pogum was released on 11 March 2016. The film received positive reviews from critics & became commercially successful at the box office.

== Plot ==
Engineering graduate Yazhini Bakthirajan leaves Viluppuram for Chennai against her parents' wishes to pursue a career in the IT sector. When the company she works for suddenly shuts down five months later, she faces financial hardship and is forced to move into a low-cost housing colony while searching for a new job, where her neighbour Kathiravan alias Kathir resides.

Kathir is a gangster who works for a local area councillor Thilagar, whose only aim in life is to own a bar of his own. He had just been released from prison after serving a five-year sentence for taking the blame for a crime he did not commit on the orders of the councillor. Kathir did the deed on the promise that his status within the councillor's gang will be elevated once he is released, but the promise was reneged. Though both of them dislike each other in the beginning, they gradually warm up to each other despite their different backgrounds and become a sort of symbiotic support system for one another.

Facing pressure from her family over her career and wedding, Yazhini introduces Kathir to her parents as her boyfriend and a successful manager at an IT firm. Her parents decide to fix their marriage but change their mind after seeing Kathir thrashing two men outside a temple, realising that he is a gangster. They bar Yazhini from returning to Chennai, even forbidding her to attend an important job interview. Meanwhile, Kathir starts a gang war by beating up the henchmen of a policeman turned rival gangster Moda Kumar. The councillor decides that Kathir should murder Kumar. After ensuring that Yazhini attends her interview, Kathir proceeds with the plan to murder Kumar. However, during the ensuing scuffle, Kathir ends up being stabbed with a rebar and is left to bleed to death.

Two years later, Yazhini has become a project lead at her company and has moved out of the housing colony. She constantly thinks about Kathir, whom she had never seen again after her interview. Yazhini yearns to show Kathir her new life, knowing that he is the one person who will be happier than even herself in her having achieved her dreams. She soon finds Kathir working at a petrol bunk, having survived his murder attempt and abandoned his rowdy past. The two rejoice in the happy ending.

== Cast ==
- Vijay Sethupathi as Kathiravan
- Madonna Sebastian as Yazhini Bakthirajan
- P. Samuthirakani as Moda Kumar
- G. M. Sundar as Thilagar
- K. S. G. Venkatesh as Bakthirajan
- D. R. K. Kiran as Sampath
- Rindhu Ravi as Yazhini's mother
- Manikandan as Murali
- Sameer Bharat Ram
- Kailash
- Supergood Subramani
- Anushka
- Ramesh Thilak as Cab driver (cameo appearance)

== Production ==
=== Development ===
"[Kadhalum Kadandhu Pogum is] a story about two people who are poles apart coming together. By the time they fall in love, the film ends, making it different from others films in the same genre. There are cliched events but those are narrated with twists and turns."

— Nalan Kumarasamy, on Kadhalum Kadandhu Pogum

After the success of his feature directorial debut, the black comedy Soodhu Kavvum (2013), Nalan Kumarasamy renewed his association with producer C. V. Kumar for his sophomore. Nalan wrote two scripts set in the same genre, the latter being Kai Neelam, which was a part of Nalan's planned trilogy of black comedy films, that included Soodhu Kavvum as well. However, by the time pre-production ended, several other films in the same genre were released which led to him shelving Kai Neelam, and rewriting the entire script from scratch, changing the genre to romantic comedy. Nalan, having liked the South Korean film My Dear Desperado (2010), decided to remake it and the rights were bought for ₹40 lakh (equivalent to ₹63 lakh or US$65,000 in 2026).

It took Nalan nearly one-and-a-half years to complete the script. Nalan further described the film as "a rom-com without romance; the romance really starts only at the end. Think of it as a light-hearted version of Masaan" and added that the film would explore the internal problems within the characters. The film was earlier developed under the informal title Eskimo Kadhal before the official title Kadhalum Kadanthu Pogum was announced in September 2015. It was also produced by K. E. Gnanavel Raja of Studio Green. Nalan retained most of the crew members who worked with him in Soodhu Kavvum, which included music composer Santhosh Narayanan, cinematographer Dinesh B. Krishnan, and editor Leo John Paul.

=== Casting and filming ===
For the protagonist, gangster Kathiravan, Nalan initially approached Suriya and M. Sasikumar to play the lead role, before finalising Soodhu Kavvum star Vijay Sethupathi. Speaking of his casting, Nalan admitted that "whoever listened to the script felt Vijay Sethupathi would suit the role" which resulted in his reunion and further added that his role would be different from his other performances. He further considered Samantha Ruth Prabhu as the lead actress, but later decided on Madonna Sebastian as he wanted someone who had acting skills but could also showcase innocence onscreen. Madonna revealed that some of the crew of her Malayalam film Premam (2015) suggested her to the director, and she got selected after a successful audition. The film is her first in Tamil, and Madonna said that since she was not familiar with the language, she took time to learn Tamil to perform better. Principal photography began in April 2015 with the first schedule being in Chennai, and wrapped that July.

== Soundtrack ==
The soundtrack was composed by Santhosh Narayanan in his second collaboration with Nalan Kumarasamy after Soodhu Kavvum. One of the songs, "Ka Ka Ka Po" was released as a single on 8 February 2016, and became an instant hit upon release. The entire album released on 22 February 2016 by Sony Music India which acquired the music rights.

== Marketing and release ==
The film's first look poster was released in mid-January 2016, with the acronym Ka Ka Ka Po (inspired from the 2006 film Imsai Arasan 23rd Pulikecei) prominently visible. Shortly thereafter, debutant filmmaker P. S. Vijay sued the makers as he found the title too similar to his film Ka Ka Ka Po, although Vijay's film has a different expansion. He also stated that this may not only create misperception among the audience but also affects the business prospects of the films.

The film was initially scheduled for a theatrical release on 12 February 2016, coinciding with the Valentine's Day weekend. However, due to post-production delays, the makers pushed the release to 11 March 2016. It was granted exemption from the entertainment tax levied by the Tamil Nadu state government, and opened in more than 300 screens across Tamil Nadu. Due to positive response the number of screens had been increased on 14 March. The film was distributed in Tamil Nadu by Abi & Abi Pictures.

== Reception ==
=== Critical response ===
M Suganth of The Times of India gave three-and-a-half out of five stars saying "The stylish nonchalance of Vijay Sethupathi and the earnestness of Madonna Sebastian complement each perfectly that we root for these characters to succeed". Praising the performances of Vijay Sethupathi and Madonna Sebastian, with the writing, Sify reviewed the film as a "classy rom-com" giving three out of five stars for the film. Gautaman Bhaskaran gave three stars in his review for Hindustan Times saying "though the film is often predictable and ponderous, there are some interesting shots that lift the narrative".

Writing for India Today, Kirubhakar Purushothaman gave three-and-a-half out of five stars and praised the performances of the actors along with the writing and filmmaking. S. Saraswathi of Rediff gave three out of five stars saying "The best part is that, though the film revolves around Kathir and Yazhini, they are just small players in the larger story. With riveting performances by the lead actors, a delightful script and the magic wielded by of director Nalan Kumarasamy and composer Santhosh Narayanan, the film is a sure winner". Baradwaj Rangan, writing for The Hindu, praised Nalan for "breaking the stereotypes of romance genre films in Tamil", saying he "isn't just reshaping the Kollywood romance here [...] He's also reshaping the hero himself". He added, "the Kathir-Yazhini scenes accrue weight towards the closing portions, so much so that we find ourselves completing their stories in our heads during the drive home."

=== Box office ===
In its opening weekend, the film collected ₹8 crore (US$830,000) in Tamil Nadu. Overall, it was the highest opening in Sethupathi's career to that point. The film released in more than 47 theatres in North America and grossed US$12,583 on its first day, and $99,695 (₹66,90,000) within the first three days. In Australia, the film grossed US$33,620 (₹66,90,000) in the opening weekend.

== Accolades ==
At the 6th South Indian International Movie Awards, Madonna was nominated for Best Debut Actress.
