= Road No. 1 =

- Promotional poster
- Also known as: Road Number One
- Genre: Romance; Drama; Action; War
- Written by: Han Ji-hoon
- Directed by: Lee Jang-soo; Kim Jin-min
- Starring: So Ji-sub; Kim Ha-neul; Yoon Kye-sang
- Country of origin: South Korea
- Original language: Korean
- No. of episodes: 20

Production
- Running time: 60 minutes
- Production company: Logos Film

Original release
- Network: MBC TV
- Release: July 23 – August 26, 2010

Road No. 1 (Korean: 로드 넘버원) is a 2010 South Korean television series, starring So Ji-sub, Kim Ha-neul and Yoon Kye-sang. The story revolves around two young soldiers, the woman they both love, and the Korean War that tears all their lives apart. The drama's title, Road No. 1, refers to the route connecting Seoul to Pyongyang, the soldiers' long and brutal road of sacrifice and survival. It aired on MBC from July 23 to August 26, 2010 on Wednesdays and Thursdays at 21:55 for 20 episodes.

== Plot ==
Lee Jang-woo (So Ji-sub) would do anything for his childhood sweetheart Soo-yeon (Kim Ha-neul). When Soo-yeon's family falls on hard times, he joins the army in order to earn money to pay for her tuition. While Jang-woo is on his tour of duty, Soo-yeon studies hard and spends her time helping injured soldiers as a doctor. She patiently awaits Jang-woo's return, but one day receives word that he has died in combat. Fate brings another man into her life: Shin Tae-ho, a handsome and generous officer who graduated from the army academy at the top of his class. Though she can't forget Jang-woo, Soo-yeon finally decides to leave the past behind her and marry Tae-ho. On the eve of their wedding, Jang-woo suddenly appears again, revealing that the death notice had been a mistake. He had, in fact, been counting the days until he can return home and reunite with his lover. The next morning - June 25, 1950 - the North Korean army invades South Korea, marking the start of the Korean War. With their lives and love already in turmoil, both Jang-woo and Tae-ho are sent north to the battlefield.

== Cast ==
- So Ji-sub as Lee Jang-woo
- Kim Ha-neul as Kim Soo-yeon
  - Kim You-jung as young Soo-yeon
- Yoon Kye-sang as Shin Tae-ho
- Choi Min-soo as Yoon Sam-soo, Commander of the 2nd Company
- Son Chang-min as Oh Jong-ki
- Kim Jin-woo as Kim Soo-hyuk
- Nam Bo-ra as Kim Soo-hee
- Julien Kang as U.S. Marine Corps Platoon Leader
- Kim Ye-ri as Jo In-sook

=== Supporting cast ===
- Jin Seon-kyu as Go Man-yong
- Lee Kwan-hoon as Kwon Jin-chul
- Kim Dong-gon as Kim Duk-shil
- Kim Jung-woon as Kim Byung-goo
- Park Kwan-shik as Kim Bok-soo
- Han Gook-jin as Kim Sang-gook
- Cha Hyun-woo as Ma Chang-kil
- Min Bok-gi as Park Dal-moon
- Oh Dae-hwan as Park Moon-ho
- Shin Dam-soo as Lee Geun-bae
- Kim Dong-hyun as Jang Doo-shik
- Lee Jin-sung as Jo In-kye
- Park Byung-eun as Han Young-min
- Noh Young-hak as Heo Chan-shik
- Song Jae-hee as Yang Kang-tae
- Kim Gun as Lee Joo-hwan
- Jo Wan-ki as Park Hong-ki
- Kim Soo-hwan as Woo Bum-jin
- Noh Hyung-ok as Young-soo
- Yoo Jung-ho as Byun Dae-young
- Jung Seung-won as trumpeter
- Jang Min-ho as older Jang-woo
- Choi Bool-am as older Tae-ho
- Shin Hyun-joon as North Korean commissioned officer Jo Sang-wi (cameo)
- Lee Chun-hee as soldier in the Youngchongyo bombing (cameo)
- Jung Kyung-ho as man who picks up garbage to sell (cameo)
- Hwang Bo-ra as girl from Jong-ki's hometown (cameo)
- Oh Man-seok as North Korean soldier (cameo)
- Moon Chae-won as female soldier taking care of older Jang-woo (cameo)
- Kim Yeo-jin as wife of soldier in squad 2 (cameo)
- Jung So-young as (cameo)

== Soundtrack ==
1. Even Becoming the Wild - Hwanhee
2. Even If the World Separates Us - Wheesung
3. Because I'm a Woman - IU
4. Same Heart - Baek Ji-young
5. Idly - Naomi
6. Only You - Kim Jin-woo
7. The Sound of Memory - So Ji-sub
8. Youngchonmyeon - Kim Hyo-soo
9. Call of Korean (Inst.) - Hwang Sang-jun
10. Action No. 1 (Inst.) - Ryu Hyung-wook
11. A Flower On the Ruins (Inst.) - Noh Hyung-woo
12. Victory (Inst.) - Hwang Sang-jun
13. Battlefield (Inst.) - Noh Hyung-woo
14. Jang-woo's Theme (Inst.) - Hwang Sang-jun
15. Who Wanted This War? (Inst.) - Ryu Hyung-wook
16. Requiem (Inst.) - Hwang Sang-jun
17. Even Becoming the Wild (Guitar Version) - Hwanhee
18. Even If the World Separates Us (Piano Version) - Wheesung
19. Because I'm a Woman (Piano Version) - IU
20. Same Heart (Humming Version) - Baek Ji-young

Special Bonus:

1. Call of Korean (TV Version) - Various Artists

== Production ==
This was So Ji-sub and Kim Ha-neul's first acting collaboration after they were paired in a commercial shoot for fashion brand Storm in 1997. It was also Kim and Yoon Kye-sang's onscreen reunion following the 2008 film Lovers of Six Years.

In preparation for their roles, the lead actors underwent military training with Korea's Fifth Division Army.

== Reception ==
Expectations were high for the ₩13 billion big-budget war epic, and it was sold to Japan before it premiered in Korea. But the series did not achieve high ratings, averaging 6% for its run.

== Ratings ==
- In the ratings below, the highest rating for the show will be in red and the lowest rating for the show will be in blue.

2010		AGB Nielsen Ratings (Nationwide)
Episode	Date	AGB Nielsen Ratings (Nationwide)
1	23 June	9.1%
2	24 June	9.2%
3	30 June	7.2%
4	1 July	7.4%
5	7 July	6.3%
6	8 July	6.4%
7	14 July	6.5%
8	15 July	6.9%
9	14 July	6.5%
10	15 July	5.9%
11	28 July	6.8%
12	29 July	5.1%
13	4 August	5.2%
14	5 August	5.3%
15	11 August	4.9%
16	12 August	5.2%
17	18 August	4.6%
18	19 August	4.8%
19	25 August	5.2%
20	26 August	5.3%
