= List of Tramps Like Us chapters =

The cover of the first volume of Tramps Like Us as published by Kodansha on December 13, 2000, in Japan.

The chapters of Tramps Like Us were written and illustrated by Yayoi Ogawa. The series first appeared as a single chapter work, named Pet, that appeared in the June 2000 issue of Kiss Carnival, where it ran for four chapters. It was then transferred to Kiss later in 2000 where it ran until 2005. It was renamed to Kimi wa Pet after the fifth chapter. The chapters tell the story of Sumire, a young professional woman who takes in a younger man as a pet, and her attempts to keep her coworkers and boyfriend from finding out about her pet. The chapters were adapted into a television drama in 2003.

The 82 chapters, called "Rules", were collected and published in 14 bound volumes by Kodansha between December 2000 and December 2005. An additional volume called Kimi Wa Pet The Best (きみはペット THE BEST) was released in October 2002. In early 2004, "Supplement: Kimiwa Pet" was included as a free extra with Kiss. A special edition of the eleventh volume was offered which included a toy shaped like Momo. Tokyopop licensed the series for English-language release in North America and gave the series its English name of Tramps Like Us. It released the first volume in August 2004 and the final volume in February 2008. As of August 2009, the English edition is out of print. The series was published as Tramps Like Us - Kimi Wa Pet by Tokyopop Germany between November 2004 and February 2007. It was published as Kimi Wa Pet - Au pied, chéri! in French by Kurokawa between September 2005 and November 2007. It was published in Italian by Star Comics between July 2004 and September 2006 as Sei Il Mio Cucciolo!.

== Volume list ==
| No. | Original release date | Original ISBN | English release date | English ISBN |
|---|---|---|---|---|
| 1 | December 13, 2000 | 978-4-06-325918-6 | August 10, 2004 | 978-1-59532-139-8 |
Rule 1: On keeping a beautiful boy as a pet; Rule 2: Happiness is making a willful pet wait; Rule 3: Home alone for the very first time; Rule 4: What to do if your pet gets lost
Sumire finds a young man injured in a cardboard box and takes him home and nurses him. He doesn't want to leave, so she makes him the offer of him staying as her pet, which he accepts. She names him Momo. Sumire's crush from university Hasumi transfers into her office and asks her out. She accepts. He learns that she has a dog (Momo) and wants to meet the dog - Momo is introduced to Hasumi as Sumire's second cousin. Momo has a dance competition and leaves Sumire for a week. Sumire doesn't get the note and goes sick with worry. She tracks down Junpei who tells her that Takeshi will come back to her.
| 2 | June 13, 2001 | 978-4-06-325939-1 | October 12, 2004 | 978-1-59532-140-4 |
Rule 5: Christmas Eve and how to spend it; Rule 6: The usefulness of companion animals; Rule 7: Is he lonesome tonight?; Rule 8: I'll show you discipline; Rule 9: Together forever; Rule 10: How to prey on the good will of others
Momo asks Sumire what they are doing for Christmas. She says she dislikes Christmas. She discusses unwanted gifts from pets with her co-workers. Hasumi also wants to make plans with Sumire for Christmas Eve, but he is called away to work. Momo makes Sumire an unwanted gift of a voucher for him to shampoo her hair, which she discards. He baked her a special Christmas cake with a toy ring inside because of a childhood story she had told him. Hasumi calls up at the last minute to try to see Sumire, but she tells him it's not a good time. He puts away a ring in a box. Sumire's workplace bans smoking, so she tries to quit. She finds it difficult, especially once Hasumi finds out she is trying. She becomes more and more irritated at work, but feels she can get through it by petting Momo when she comes home. Momo is phoned up by his ex-girlfriend, Rumi, who asks him to come see her, and then to kiss her. Sumire gets so agitated at work that she comes home early, expecting to find Momo, and wrecks the apartment and cries. Momo makes out with Rumi, but tells her he has to leave to be home for Sumire. Rumi hits him hard. Momo comes home and Sumire hugs him, relieved. The next day at work, Sumire hears the other women gossiping about Sumire possibly being pregnant due to her quitting smoking, and takes it up again.
| 3 | November 13, 2001 | 978-4-06-325960-5 | December 7, 2004 | 978-1-59532-141-1 |
Rule 11: Owners' Predicaments; Rule 12: Expressing your feelings in words; Rule 13: On strange walks; Rule 14: For a fun vacation; Rule 15: Once bitten...; Rule 16: The homing instinct
| 4 | April 12, 2002 | 978-4-06-325978-0 | February 8, 2005 | 978-1-59532-142-8 |
Rule 17: Looks can be deceiving; Rule 18: Remembering your own value; Rule 19: Job too cool for your pet?; Rule 20: On keeping secrets... or not; Rule 21: On when to bring small creatures home; Rule 22: Cherishing your memories
| 5 | August 9, 2002 | 978-4-06-325997-1 | Mai 10, 2005 | 978-1-59532-143-5 |
Rule 23: How much is that doggie in the window?; Rule 24: Proper behavior; Rule 25: What you want vs. what you need; Rule 26: How to have a tender touch; Rule 27: The fool, or the fool who follows?; Rule 28: What kind of pet owner are you?
| 6 | December 13, 2002 | 978-4-06-340409-8 | August 9, 2005 | 978-1-59532-144-2 |
Rule 29: Your pet's private life; Rule 30: On mysterious trips--part 1; Rule 31: On mysterious trips--part 2; Rule 32: Something about her; Rule 33: A soft cage; Rule 34: When pets dance
| 7 | April 11, 2003 | 978-4-06-340426-5 | November 8, 2005 | 978-1-59532-145-9 |
Rule 35: Crazy About You; Rule 36: My Pet Is A Celebrity; Rule 37: Her Amazing Makeover; Rule 38: Missing You; Rule 39: A Sleeping Beauty; Rule 40: Hong Kong, Tokyo and a Girl
Sumire goes to visit Hasumi in Hong Kong and meets his ex-girlfriend Chinfei who now has a young child. Chinfei makes the perfume which Hasumi gave to Sumire as a present. Chinfei tells Sumire that the child is Hasumi's, and asks Sumire to call her any time.
| 8 | September 12, 2003 | 978-4-06-340446-3 | February 7, 2006 | 978-1-59532-438-2 |
Rule 41: Explosion! ♡ A loving fist; Rule 42: Why We Stay; Rule 43: In Her Memory; Rule 44: A Suggestion of Adventure; Rule 45: You Are My Pet; Rule 46: Against the Rules
Sumire stews over Chinfei's assertion and picks a physical fight with Hasumi. Sumire then goes and gets drunk and wakes up in Chinfei's house. Chinfei takes care of Sumire and tells her that she lied about her baby's paternity to make Sumire jealous. Rumi finds a bracelet that she had bought for Takeshi when they were dating and confronts him, crying, asking him if he still likes her. He says that he does, but that he needs to move on.
| 9 | February 13, 2004 | 978-4-06-340471-5 | June 13, 2006 | 978-1-59532-439-9 |
Rule 47: Count Down; Rule 48: You are a pet?!; Rule 49: Pandora's Box; Rule 50: Wonderful Friends; Rule 51: Love ♡ Love ♡ Love ♡; Rule 52: Elegy (...I got wet)
| 10 | July 13, 2004 | 978-4-06-340493-7 | October 10, 2006 | 978-1-59532-640-9 |
Rule 53: Mutual therapy; Rule 54: Ice Queen; Rule 55: Woman of the Cancer sign; Rule 56: Kotobuki-Taisha; Rule 57: Some kind of En; Rule 58: Priorities
Momo passes out at his class, and Sumire tells Hasumi she'll marry him. Momo and Sumire resolve to rehabilitate themselves to being apart. Sumire offers to take care of Ran while her friend goes on a holiday. Shinobu checks up on Sumire and tells Momo a bit about their childhood. Ran falls in the bathtub and Shinobu gives instructions over the phone to resuscitate Ran, who survives. Sumire and Hasumi, both Cancers, read their horoscope and jump to conclusions. Sukenari loses his will to write, but helping an old man write a love letter to his dying English-speaking wife reignites his passion. Sumire worries about meeting her future in-laws. Emma and Sumire, and later, Sumire and Yuri discuss en, a Buddhist concept similar to fate or luck in relationships. Akane, Sumire's little sister who founded a biker gang, comes to visit and discovers Momo who is going away for a few days to Hong Kong. She talks to Sumire about her grandfather pressuring her to break up with her boyfriend. Her boyfriend gets a conventional job with her grandfather's company so that he can continue to be with Akane and their future child. At the airport, Momo sees Fukushima hanging off Hasumi's arm and takes a photo.
| 11 | November 12, 2004 | 978-4-06-340514-9; ISBN 978-4-06-362034-4 | February 13, 2007 | 978-1-59816-198-4 |
Rule 59: Ultra-Frustration; Rule 60: A Dangerous Vacation; Rule 61: Confession; Rule 62: Jumpy; Rule 63: Happy Birthday; Rule 64: Just For Tonight
Momo deletes the photo he took of Hatsumi and Fukushima. Sumire discovers the card of a topless bar in Momo's pocket (the bar where Fukushima works) and gives him the silent treatment. She goes on holidays where she is targeted by a rapist who uses hypnotism.
| 12 | March 11, 2005 | 978-4-06-340533-0 | June 12, 2007 | 978-1-59816-199-1 |
Rule 65: Initiation; Rule 66: Your Slave; Rule 67: What's With Her?; Rule 68: I've lost interest in every man on Earth; Rule 69: Last Dance; Rule 70: Wait a minute here
| 13 | September 13, 2005 | 978-4-06-340559-0 | October 10, 2007 | 978-1-59816-875-4 |
Rule 71: Your Smile; Rule 72: Guardian; Rule 73: The Heart of Love; Rule 74: Just Because You're You; Rule 75: Never Say Die; Rule 76: Grow Up; Sumire
| 14 | December 13, 2005 | 978-4-06-340571-2 | February 13, 2008 | 978-1-59816-876-1 |
Rule 77: How to make a family; Rule 78: L'etranger; Rule 79: Gently, without touching; Rule 80: Girls; Rule 81: Nothing happens; Last Rule: Our future
Sumire meets Momo's older sisters and mother and is accepted by them. That night they discuss having a baby. Rumi has trouble fitting in at her new school because she has trouble expressing herself in English, and fights with her boyfriend. She goes to visit Momo and talks to him about her frustrations. She asks him how to apologize to Theo in French, and Sumire tells Theo how to say 'cheer up!' in Japanese. Hasumi goes back to Tokyo and reminisces about going to college with Sumire, making his peace with the past. He proposes to Fukushima.

=== The Best ===
| No. | Release date | ISBN |
|---|---|---|
| | October 11, 2002 | 978-4-06-337506-0 |
