= Yoon Kye-sang =

South Korean actor and singer (born 1978)

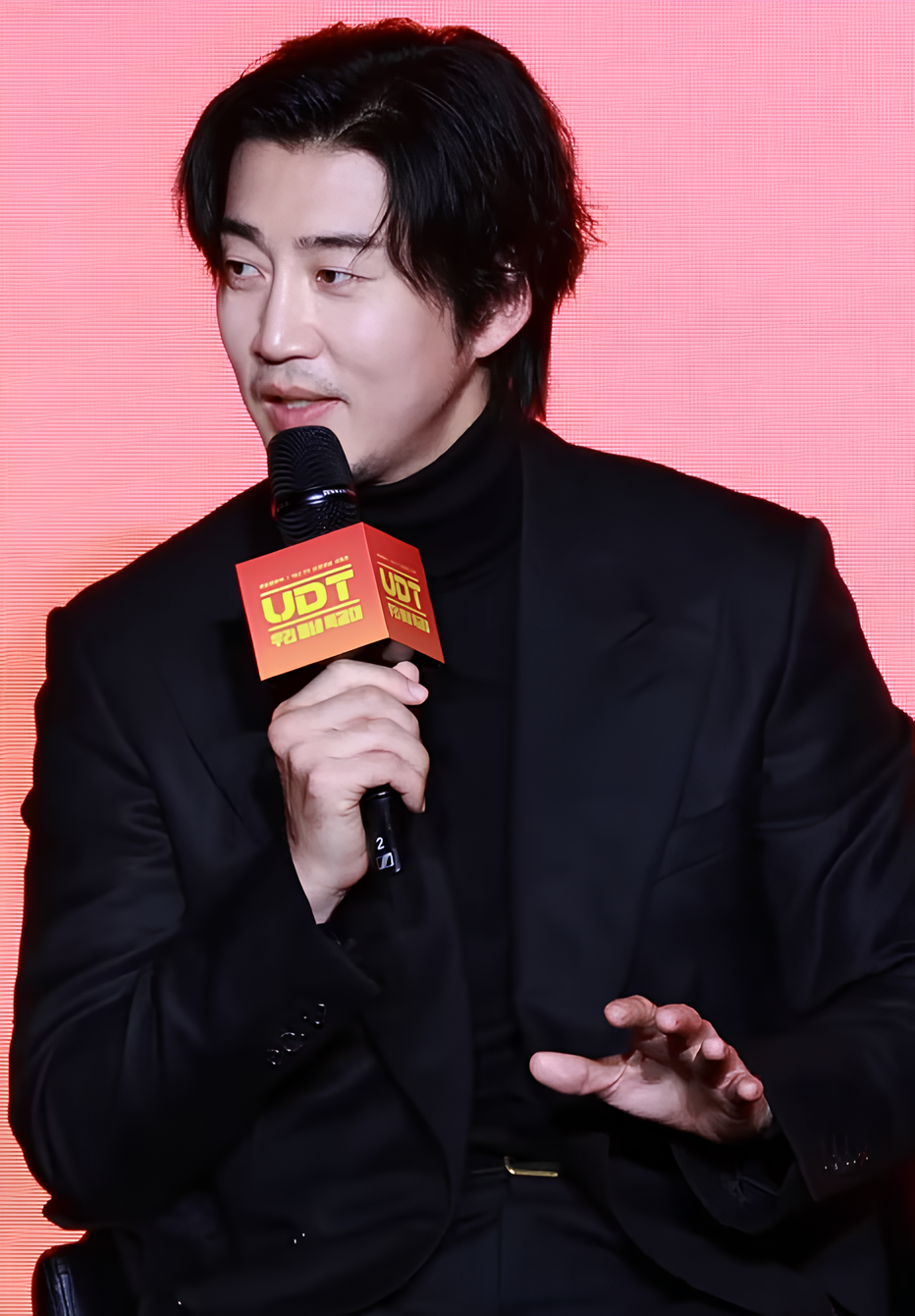
- Yoon in 2025
- Born: December 20, 1978 (age 47); Jamsil-dong, Songpa-gu, Seoul, South Korea
- Education: Chungkang College of Cultural Industries; Kyung Hee University
- Occupations: Actor; singer
- Years active: 1999–present
- Agent: Just Entertainment
- Spouse: Cha Hye-young (m. 2021)
- Musical career
- Genres: K-pop, R&B
- Years active: 1999–2004; 2014–present
- Member of: g.o.d

Korean name
- Hangul: 윤계상
- Hanja: 尹啓相
- RR: Yun Gyesang
- MR: Yun Kyesang

Yoon Kye-sang (Korean: 윤계상; born December 20, 1978) is a South Korean actor and singer. He began his career in 1999 as part of the K-pop boy band g.o.d, then left the group in 2004 and pursued an acting career. He made his acting debut in the film Flying Boys (2004), for which he won Best New Actor at the Baeksang Arts Awards. Yoon became active in both television and film, with leading roles in romantic comedies such as My 19 Year Old Sister-in-Law (2004) and Who Are You? (2008) and the melodrama Crazy for You (2007), as well as more serious fare in The Moonlight of Seoul (2008) and The Executioner (2009). After a supporting turn in the hit series The Greatest Love (2011), he returned to the big screen in the well-received indie Poongsan (2011).

== Career ==
=== 1999–2004: Pop star beginnings ===
In 1997 Yoon answered an advertisement for Park Joon-hyung's project music group and had auditioned with aspirations of becoming a rock star. Along with Danny Ahn, Son Ho-young, Kim Sun-a and producer and singer-songwriter Park Jin-young, the group was initially called "GOT6". Kim Sun-a left to pursue acting and was replaced by Kim Tae-woo. The group became a five-member boy band called g.o.d, short for "Groove Over Dose", and debuted in January 1999. Despite the lukewarm response to their debut performance, the group would go on to establish themselves as one of the most popular boy bands of the early 2000s. However, Yoon left the band in 2004 and went into acting, making his film debut in Flying Boys, directed by Byun Young-joo. He made his television debut that same year in My 19 Year Old Sister-in-Law with Jung Da-bin.

The group would release their seventh and final album before going on indefinite hiatus in December 2005 and some of the group's fans called Yoon a "traitor" and blamed him for "breaking up the group". Various media outlets speculated that there was a rift amongst the members and that he had turned his back on them in favor of acting, rumors that Yoon and the other four members chose not to publicly confirm or deny. He has since clarified in his 2012 cooking show Yoon Kye-sang's One Table that he left the group with the intention of leaving the entertainment industry altogether as he had begun to detest the spotlight, but stumbled upon an opportunity to try acting and enjoyed it.

=== Military service ===
Having just departed from g.o.d, Yoon was at the height of his popularity, but had to interrupt his nascent acting career due to mandatory military service. He enlisted in the Republic of Korea Army on December 7, 2004, and was assigned to the 102nd Reserves at Chuncheon, Gangwon Province, on the Korean Demilitarized Zone. After completing basic training and serving there for some time, Yoon was reassigned in 2006 to duties as an "entertainment soldier" in the newly formed group Korean Forces Network, which provides television and radio broadcasts to soldiers, and also allows celebrities to maintain a public profile while completing their military service. He was discharged from the army on December 6, 2006. In an interview that day, he said that he had not slept the night before and was very tired, but looked forward to seeing his fans; he further stated that he planned to resume his career in 2007.

As late as June 2011, his military service still earned him public attention, when a round-cheeked photo of him in uniform "went viral" among South Korean internet users. The photos received many amused comments for his then-fat cheeks, forming a sharp contrast with his more recent appearance.

=== 2004–2013: Acting career ===
In January 2007, Yoon returned to show business in the television drama Crazy in Love (also known as Crazy for You); he portrayed a gangster who falls in love with the widow (Lee Mi-yeon) of a man he'd accidentally killed. The following year, he and Kim Ha-neul were cast in Lovers of Six Years, playing a couple in a six-year relationship. According to Kim, her initial perception of Yoon was that he was very shy, whereas Yoon perceived Kim as snobby, so it took them some time to break the ice and establish a good working relationship. Later that year, he took a dual role in the comedy television series Who Are You?, playing a cold-hearted corporate raider who, in the aftermath of a traffic accident, becomes possessed by the spirit of a cheerful deliveryman for a few hours each day. At the same time he took a starring role opposite Ha Jung-woo in Beastie Boys (also known as The Moonlight of Seoul), portraying a worker in a host club; The Korea Times movie review praised him for his "gripping performance."

In 2009, he left his agency SidusHQ and joined My Name Is Entertainment. After doing a lighter role in the slice-of-life drama Triple, Yoon starred in the movie The Executioner, which examined capital punishment in South Korea; it debuted at the 14th Busan International Film Festival. Yoon played the role of a junior prison guard who takes up his post after failing an examination, and unluckily finds himself assigned to carry out executions after the only other guard in the prison with such experience quits. Just before the movie came out, he made controversial remarks in an interview with GQ Korea stating that the South Korean movie industry was dominated by leftists. As controversy rose among internet users over his remarks, he quickly made an apology for what he described as his "ignorance." He also became part of the ensemble cast in Come, Closer, a 2010 omnibus feature that follows the broken relationships of five couples.

After his highly anticipated big-budget Korean War drama Road No. 1, tanked in the ratings, Yoon said he wanted to play a character "who gets loved by the public" and took on a supporting role as a sweet, kind doctor in romantic comedy The Greatest Love.

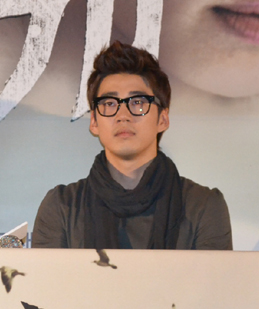
Yoon in 2011

The drama's success and Yoon's popularity in it helped bring attention to his next project, the low-budget, gritty indie Poongsan. Director Juhn Jai-hong fought to cast Yoon against type as the titular taciturn messenger, saying that he'd been impressed by the piercing gaze Yoon had shown in previous films. Calling it "a meaningful project," Yoon enjoyed the difficult acting challenge of telling the story only through his eyes, facial expressions and body movements. He was recognized with Best Actor nominations from the 2011 Grand Bell Awards and Blue Dragon Film Awards.

After starring in the third season of popular sitcom High Kick!, he was cast in the action thriller The Suspect, but withdrew when co-star Choi Min-sik backed out. He also pulled out from Acting Class when the big-screen comedy encountered pre-production delays.

In May 2012, he transferred to a new agency, A List Entertainment. Then Yoon and close friend, actor Kwon Se-in (who uses the stage name Kwon Yul) filmed the reality/travelogue program Real Mate in Sydney for seven days and six nights. Kwon also appeared on Yoon Kye-sang's One Table, a reality show on cable channel O'live that helped fulfill Yoon's dream of owning a restaurant. After honing his cooking skills and learning culinary secrets, Yoon prepared a feast for his former band members g.o.d on the show's season finale; it was also the first time in eight years all five members of g.o.d appeared on television together.

Yoon then appeared in Kim Jee-woon's short film One Perfect Day in 2013. He also starred in a Chinese film titled Hello My Love, which premiered online and garnered over 100 million hits.

Yoon then signed with a new talent agency, Saram Entertainment.

=== 2014–present: Reunion with g.o.d and later projects ===
In early 2014 it was announced that g.o.d's original five members would be reuniting to celebrate the band's 15th anniversary. It also marked Yoon's return to the music industry after a decade. They released their eighth album in July and afterwards embarked on a successful nationwide concert tour. Yoon wrote the lyrics for the song "Wind" (바람), which was released after the conclusion of their nationwide tour as a gesture of gratitude to fans.

In 2014, Yoon starred in the melodrama series The Full Sun, in which he played a con man who enters a complicated romance with a jewelry heiress. This was followed by the romantic comedy film Red Carpet, in the role of an adult film director who dreams of making his first commercial feature.

Minority Opinion (also known as The Unfair), Yoon's film where he played a public defender whose client is accused of killing a riot policeman during a forced demolition, which had wrapped filming in 2013, finally received a theatrical release in 2015. He next starred in Last, a cable series based on Kang Hyung-kyu's webtoon about a fund manager whose financial ruin leads to life among the homeless living underground at Seoul Station, followed by Love Guide for Dumpees (titled A Dramatic Night in Korean), a play-turned-movie about a man and woman who agree to be casual lovers but end up finding something more.

In 2016, Yoon was cast in the Korean remake of American television series The Good Wife. Yoon then played a disabled man in the film The Bacchus Lady, a bittersweet drama about an elderly prostitute helmed by E J-yong.

Yoon played a villain role in crime noir The Outlaws, which premiered in late 2017. He next starred in the thriller Golden Slumber, playing a friend of the protagonist tasked to chase him down.

In 2019, Yoon starred in Mal-Mo-E: The Secret Mission, which depicts two men who travel the country to collect Korean words in secret in 1910. The same year, he was cast in the fantasy action film Fluid Renegade.

== Personal life ==
Yoon is the youngest of two siblings in his family. He describes having been very embarrassed as a young boy when he ran errands for his mother and elder sister, such as buying tampons for them at the store.

In December 2000, Yoon, then a member of g.o.d, received a poisoned drink from a supposed fan. Yoon's mother drank the drink and had to have her stomach pumped.

Yoon and three friends opened the first cereal café bar in Seoul called Midnight in Seoul which has since become a franchise. The initially small venture became popular on social media within South Korea due to its popularity with K-pop idol singers who frequented the place and posted pictures online. Entertainer and 2AM member Jo Kwon became president of the franchise while Yoon and his friends remain the owners and still run the original café. Midnight in Seoul officially closed in October 2018.

In an interview with GQ Korea in April 2021, Yoon revealed that he had suffered a brain aneurysm and underwent urgent endovascular coiling surgery the year before in 2020.

=== Relationship and marriage ===
In June 2021, Yoon's agency confirmed that he was in a relationship with a non-celebrity. In August 2021, Yoon's agency stated that Yoon is going to marry his non-celebrity girlfriend. Due to the COVID-19 pandemic, he stated that they decided to legally register their marriage first and hold the wedding at a later date. The wedding took place on June 9, 2022.

== Filmography ==
=== Film ===
Year	Title	Role	Notes	Ref.
2004	Flying Boys	Kang Min-jae		
2008	Lovers of Six Years	Kim Jae-young		
2008	The Moonlight of Seoul	Kim Seung-woo		
2009	The Executioner	Oh Jae-kyung		
2010	Come, Closer	Hyun-oh		
2011	Poongsan	Poongsan		
2013	One Perfect Day	Un-cheol	Short film	
2013	Hello My Love			
2014	Red Carpet	Park Jung-woo		
2015	Minority Opinion	Yoon Jin-won		
2015	A Dramatic Night	Yoo Jung-hoon		
2016	The Bacchus Lady	Do-hoon		
2017	The Outlaws	Jang Chen		
2018	Golden Slumber	Moo-yeol	Cameo	
2019	Mal-Mo-E: The Secret Mission	Ryu Jung-hwan		
2021	Spiritwalker	Kang Eui-ah		
2023	Single in Seoul	Seon-woo	Cameo	

=== Television series ===
Year	Title	Role	Notes	Ref.
2001	New Nonstop			
2004	My 19 Year Old Sister-in-Law	Kang Seung-jae		
2007	Crazy for You	Kim Chae-joon		
2008	Who Are You?	Cha Seung-hyo		
2009	Triple	Jang Hyun-tae		
2010	Road No. 1	Shin Tae-ho		
2011	The Greatest Love	Yoon Pil-joo		
2011	High Kick: Revenge of the Short Legged	Yoon Kye-sang		
2013	Potato Star 2013QR3	Brain surgeon Kye-sang	Cameo (episodes 9–10)	
2014	Beyond the Clouds	Jung Se-ro / Lee Eun-soo		
2015	Last	Jang Tae-ho		
2016	The Good Wife	Seo Joong-won		
2019	Chocolate	Lee Kang		
2022	Kiss Sixth Sense	Cha Min-hoo		
2023	The Kidnapping Day	Kim Myung-joon		
2023	Destined With You	CEO Lawfirm Law & High	Cameo	
2024	The Frog	Gu Sang-jun		
2025	The Winning Try	Ju Ga-ram		
2025	Heroes Next Door	Choi Kang		
TBA	The Couple Are Playing	Pyeon Seong-joon		

=== Web series ===
Year	Title	Role	Ref.
2021	Crime Puzzle	Han Seung-min	

=== Television shows ===
Year	Title	Role	Notes	Ref.
2000–2001	g.o.d's Babysitting Diaries	Cast Member		
2010	It Travel: Yoon Kye-sang in Turkey	Main Cast		
2012	Real Mate in Australia: Kye-sang and Se-in Go to Sydney	Cast Member	with Kwon Yul	
2012	One Table with Yoon Kye-sang	Main Cast		
2013	Stars into Travel: Yoon Kye-sang's Tasteful Journey to Gyeongbuk	Cast Member		

=== Web shows ===
Year	Title	Role	Notes	Ref.
2021	Saturday Night Live Korea	Host	Episode 9	

=== Music video appearances ===
Year	Title	Artist(s)	Ref.
2021	"Cheers": with Elle Korea; Yoon Kye-sang; and Moon Ga-young	Code Kunst; Lee Chan-hyuk; Colde; sogumm	

== Accolades ==
=== Awards and nominations ===
Year	Award	Category	Nominated work	Result	Ref.
2004	SBS Drama Awards	Excellence Award, Actor in a Drama Special	My 19 Year Old Sister-in-Law	Nominated	
2005	41st Baeksang Arts Awards	Best New Actor	Flying Boys	Won	
2005	26th Blue Dragon Film Awards	Best New Actor	Flying Boys	Nominated	
2005	4th Korean Film Awards	Best New Actor	Flying Boys	Nominated	
2007	Andre Kim Best Star Awards	Best Star Award, Male category	—N/a	Won	
2007	SBS Drama Awards	Excellence Award, Actor in a Miniseries	Crazy for You	Nominated	
2008	2nd Mnet 20's Choice	Hot Movie Star Actor	The Moonlight of Seoul	Nominated	
2011	48th Grand Bell Awards	Best Actor	Poongsan	Nominated	
2011	32nd Blue Dragon Film Awards	Best Actor	Poongsan	Nominated	
2011	7th Mnet 20's Choice	Hot Drama Star	The Greatest Love	Nominated	
2011	MBC Entertainment Awards	Excellence Award, Actor in a Sitcom/Comedy	High Kick: Revenge of the Short Legged	Won	
2011	MBC Drama Awards	Best New Actor in a Miniseries	The Greatest Love	Nominated	
2014	KBS Drama Awards	Best Couple Award with Han Ji-hye	The Full Sun	Nominated	
2014	KBS Drama Awards	Netizen Award, Actor	The Full Sun	Nominated	
2017	6th Korea Film Actors Association Awards	Popular Star Award	The Outlaws	Won	
2018	9th KOFRA Film Awards	Discovery of the Year	The Outlaws	Won	
2018	27th Buil Film Awards	Popular Actor Award	The Outlaws	Nominated	
2018	14th Jecheon International Music & Film Festival	JIMFF Star Award	The Outlaws	Won	
2025	SBS Drama Awards	Director's Award	The Winning Try	Won	

=== Listicles ===
Name of publisher, year listed, name of listicle, and placement
Publisher	Year	Listicle	Placement	Ref.
Korean Film Council	2021	Korean Actors 200 (Note: Introduces 200 actors that best represent the present and future of Korean cinema to the people in the film industry all over the world.)	Included	
