= The Hunt (2016 film) =

- Theatrical release poster
- Directed by: Lee Woo-cheol
- Written by: Cheon Jin-woo
- Produced by: Kim Han-min
- Starring: Ahn Sung-ki; Cho Jin-woong; Han Ye-ri; Kwon Yul
- Production company: BigStone Pictures
- Distributed by: Lotte Entertainment
- Release date: 29 June 2016
- Running time: 93 minutes
- Country: South Korea
- Language: Korean
- Box office: US$4.2 million

The Hunt (Korean: 사냥; RR: Sanyang) is a 2016 South Korean action thriller film directed by Lee Woo-cheol, written by Cheon Jin-woo, and starring Cho Jin-woong and Ahn Sung-ki. The film was launched by Lotte Entertainment, South Korea's second largest film conglomerate, in March 2016. It was produced by Kim Han-min, the director of The Admiral: Roaring Currents, the biggest film ever at the Korean box office. Most of the filming for The Hunt took place in a mountainous region of Paju in Gyeonggi Province, which contains military bases; the crew had to obtain permissions from more than 10 military units prior to filming. Because of the emphasis on hunting and guns, the actors also had to finish a basic firearms course and practice at shooting ranges.

== Plot ==
When Dong-geun leads a group of armed men to mine newfound gold in a remote mountain area, the group comes into conflict with an old woman, who claims that her sons owns the land and the gold. The woman is killed during the argument; her granddaughter Kim Yang-soon and local hunter Moon Ki-sung subsequently get caught up in the conflict, with Dong-geun commanding the gold seekers to flush out the witnesses and Moon using his hunting skills to protect his neighbors. Moon, the only survivor of a mining accident that left him traumatized and isolated, often remembers the dying wish from a fellow miner to protect Yang-soon, the miner's daughter. The remainder of the story focuses on the deadly cat-and-mouse game between Moon and the gang.

== Cast ==
- Cho Jin-woong as Park Dong-geun and Myeong (twin brothers)
- Ahn Sung-ki as Moon Ki-sung
- Han Ye-ri as Kim Yang-soon
- Ye Soo-jung as Yang-soon's grandmother
- Jin Seon-kyu as Yang-soon's father
- Son Hyun-joo as Detective Son
- Shim Yi-young as Lee Geum-Ja
- Kwon Yul as Maeng Joon-Ho
- Park Byung-eun as Kwak Jong-Pil
- Han Jae-young as Kim Chang-Sik
- Kim Yoon-sung as Son Ki-Wook
- Jo Dae-hee as Lee Pil-Ho
- Cha Soon-bae as Choi Byung-Soon
- Shin Dong-mi as Moon Jung-Sook
- Yang Seo-yeon as Yang-Soon (young)
- Lee Sang-Hwa as Young-Soo
- Lee Hae-young as Moon Dae-guk
- Heo Joon-seok as Police Corporal Kim

== Release and reception ==
Filming began September 13, 2015 and finished December 15, 2015. The film was released on June 29, 2016 and opened at number 1 at the South Korean box office on its first day, attracting more than 640,000 viewers nationwide; it dropped to number 2 at the box office on its second day. The film grossed $4,422,347 at the South Korea box office and received mixed reviews, with the actors' performances generally receiving praise. Han Cinema's William Schwartz criticized The Hunt as being "excessively complicated" due to the character relationships and the use of flashbacks. South Korea's NewsTomato praised the actors' performances and the film's sustained suspense, and criticized flaws in the story.
