= Too Beautiful to Lie =

- Theatrical release poster
- Hangul: 그녀를 믿지 마세요
- Hanja: 그女를 믿지 마세요
- RR: Geunyeoreul mitji maseyo
- MR: Kŭnyŏrŭl mitchi maseyo
- Directed by: Bae Hyeong-jun
- Written by: Choi Hee-dae; Park Yeon-seon
- Produced by: An Yeong-jun; Han Ji-seung
- Starring: Kim Ha-neul; Gang Dong-won
- Cinematography: Yoon Hong-sik
- Edited by: Ko Im-pyo
- Music by: Jo Yeong-wook
- Production companies: Seasun Film; Home Box Office, Inc.
- Distributed by: Cinema Service
- Release date: February 20, 2004
- Running time: 115 minutes
- Countries: South Korea; United States
- Languages: Korean; English

The Too Beautiful to Lie (Korean: 그녀를 믿지 마세요; RR: Geunyeoreul mitji maseyo; lit. 'Don't Believe Her') is a 2004 South Korean-American romantic comedy film about a beautiful ex-con (Kim Ha-neul) and a naive village pharmacist (Gang Dong-won).

== Plot ==
Yeong-ju is a girl with cute looks, an innocent smile, and a brilliant talker. She is also in prison for fraud. She easily convinces the evaluation board to grant her parole in time to attend her older sister's wedding. As soon as she is released, she boards a train for Busan with the wooden ducks she'd handcrafted as her wedding gift. On the train, she sits across village pharmacist Hee-cheol, who is on his way to propose to his girlfriend with his deceased mother's family heirloom ring. Yeong-ju witnesses a pickpocket stealing the ring from Hee-cheol, and afraid of becoming the suspect and violating her parole, she steals the ring back for Hee-cheol. But in the process, she is unable to board the train on time, missing it and leaving her wedding gift bag on the train.

Determined to find her bag, she tracks down Hee-cheol, and arrives in his hometown Yonggang Village. But the situation becomes complicated when his family members mistake her as their future daughter-in-law due to the ring, welcoming her to the family. Unwilling to tell them the truth so that she can find her bag then leave, Yeong-ju sweetly plays along, even telling them that Hee-cheol is the father of her unborn child. Meanwhile, Hee-cheol, who wasn't able to make the marriage proposal because of the lost ring, comes back home with a heavy heart. He is enraged to find himself in the middle of Yeong-ju's schemes. Worst of all, no one believes him, thinking he had abandoned his poor pregnant fiancée, and he ends up miserably kicked out of the family home.

As a showdown brews between Yeong-ju and Hee-cheol, pitting truth vs. lies, they gradually get to know each other and fall in love.

== Cast ==
- Kim Ha-neul as Joo Yeong-ju
- Gang Dong-won as Choi Hee-cheol
- Song Jae-ho as Hee-cheol's father
- Kim Ji-young as Hee-cheol's grandma
- Ku Hye-ryung as Hee-cheol's aunt
- Lee Chun-hee as Young-deok
- Nam Soo-jung as Hee-cheol's aunt
- Lee Ju-seok as Doctor
- Lee Young-eun as Soo-mi
- Im Ha-ryong as Hee-cheol's uncle
- Myeong Ji-yeon as Hwa-sook
- Nam Sang-mi as Jae-eun
- Ryu Tae-ho as Hee-cheol's uncle
- Kim Jae-rok as pickpocket
- Park Yong-jin as Man-seok
- Jin Kyung as Joo Young-ok
- Son Young-soon as grandmother in front of the restaurant
- Lee Mi-eun as hairdresser
- Lee Jae-gu
- Park Jae-woong
- Kwon Tae-won
- Park Gun-tae as child at the pharmacy

== Awards and nominations ==
2004 Baeksang Arts Awards

- Best Actress – Kim Ha-neul
- Nomination – Best Screenplay – Choi Hee-dae, Park Yeon-seon

2004 Grand Bell Awards

- Nomination – Best Actress – Kim Ha-neul
- Nomination – Best New Actor – Gang Dong-won

2004 Blue Dragon Film Awards

- Nomination – Best Actress – Kim Ha-neul

2004 Korean Film Awards

- Nomination – Best New Actor – Gang Dong-won

2004 Director's Cut Awards

- Best New Actor – Gang Dong-won
