= Kwon Yul (actor) =

South Korean actor (born 1982)

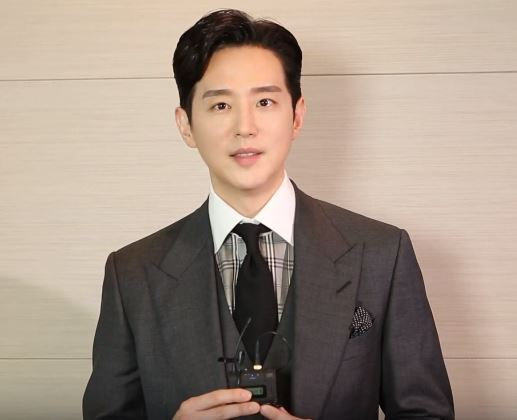
- Kwon in 2019
- Born: Kwon Se-in; June 29, 1982 (age 44); Seoul, South Korea
- Education: Chung-Ang University (Theater Studies)
- Occupation: Actor
- Years active: 2007–present
- Agent: TEAMHOPE
- Spouse: Unknown (m. 2025)

Korean name
- Hangul: 권세인
- Hanja: 權世仁
- RR: Gwon Sein
- MR: Kwŏn Sein

Stage name
- Hangul: 권율
- Hanja: 權律
- RR: Gwon Yul
- MR: Kwŏn Yul
- Website: Official website

Kwon Se-in (Korean: 권세인; born June 29, 1982), better known by the stage name Kwon Yul (권율), is a South Korean actor. He made his acting debut with a leading role in the 2007 high school sitcom Mackerel Run. Kwon is best known for his roles as Seo Ji-seok on the daily soap opera Angel's Revenge (2014), Yi Hoe in the blockbuster period film The Admiral: Roaring Currents (2014), and as Lee Sang-woo in the hit romantic comedy series Let's Eat 2 (2015).

== Personal life ==
On May 19, 2025, Kwon's agency announced that Kwon would be tying the knot on May 24 in a private ceremony in Seoul.

== Filmography ==
Key
| † | Denotes films that have not yet been released |

=== Film ===
| Year | Title | Role | Notes | Ref. |
|---|---|---|---|---|
| 2008 | Beastie Boys | Ji-hoon | | |
| 2010 | My Dear Desperado | Jae-young | | |
| 2012 | Nameless Gangster: Rules of the Time | Sobangcha impersonator 3 | | |
| 2012 | Pietà | Man with guitar | | |
| 2013 | Ingtoogi: The Battle of Internet Trolls | Hee-joon | | |
| 2014 | Tabloid Truth | Han Jung-soo | Cameo | |
| 2014 | Godsend | So-young's boyfriend | | |
| 2014 | The Admiral: Roaring Currents | Yi Hoe | | |
| 2014 | Miss the Train | Yeon-woo | | |
| 2014 | Phantoms of the Archive | | Segment "Old Film" | |
| 2014 | Twinkle-Twinkle Pitter-Patter | Commentary | Short film | |
| 2015 | Roaring Currents: The Road of the Admiral | Narrator | Documentary film | |
| 2015 | I'm After You | Yeom Ki-ho | Television film | |
| 2016 | Elephant in the Room | Ji-sub | Segment "Lucid Dream" | |
| 2016 | The Hunt | Maeng Jun-ho | | |
| 2016 | Moonlight Palace | Won | Voice | |
| 2016 | Worst Woman | Hyun-oh | | |
| 2017 | Anarchist from Colony | Lee Seok | | |
| 2017 | A Special Lady | Gong-myeong | Cameo | |
| 2018 | Champion | Jin-gi | | |
| 2022 | The Policeman's Lineage | Na Young-bin | | |

=== Television series ===
| Year | Title | Role | Notes | Ref. |
|---|---|---|---|---|
| 2007 | Mackerel Run | Baek Heon | | |
| 2008 | Working Mom | Park In-seong | | |
| 2008 | The Great King, Sejong | Shin Suk-ju | | |
| 2009 | My Fair Lady | Jung-sik | | |
| 2010 | Glad to Love You | Dong-hoon | | |
| 2011 | Lie to Me | Park Hoon | | |
| 2011 | Brain | Yeo Bong-gu | | |
| 2012 | What's Up | Director Oh | | |
| 2012 | Just an Ordinary Love Story | Han Jae-min | | |
| 2012 | Monster | Cha Eun-oh | | |
| 2012 | Seoyoung, My Daughter | Man-se, Ho-jung's blind date | Cameo (Episode 20) | |
| 2013 | She Is Wow | Ji Seong-ki | | |
| 2014 | Angel's Revenge | Seo Ji-seok | | |
| 2015 | Let's Eat 2 | Lee Sang-woo | | |
| 2016 | One More Happy Ending | Goo Hae-joon | | |
| 2016 | Bring It On, Ghost | Joo Hye-seong | | |
| 2017 | Whisper | Kang Jung-il | | |
| 2018 | Voice | Bang Je-soo | Supporting role (Season 2), Cameo (Season 3, Season 4 (Episode 14) | |
| 2019 | Haechi | Park Moon-soo | | |
| 2020 | The King: Eternal Monarch | King Lee Ho | Cameo (Episode 1, 4, 14) | |
| 2020 | My Unfamiliar Family | Yoo Min-Woo | Cameo (Episode 13–16) | |
| 2021 | Dali & Cocky Prince | Jang Tae-jin | | |
| 2022 | Mental Coach Jegal | Gu Tae-man | | |
| 2022 | Love Is for Suckers | Baek Jun-yeol | Cameo (Episode 16) | |
| 2023 | Longing for You | Cha Young-woon | | |
| 2024 | Connection | Park Tae-jin | | |
| 2024 | My Sweet Mobster | Jang Hyun-woo | | |
| 2024 | Cinderella at 2 AM | Ha Yun-seo's blind date | Cameo (Episode 5) | |
| 2026 | Fifties Professionals | Chairman Do | | |

=== Web series ===
| Year | Title | Role | Notes | Ref. |
|---|---|---|---|---|
| 2021–2022 | No, Thank You | Moon Goo-young | Season 1–2 | |

=== Television shows ===
| Year | Title | Role | Notes | Ref. |
|---|---|---|---|---|
| 2012 | Yoon Kye-sang's One Table | Host | Co-host with Yoon Kye-sang (August 26 – November 17) | |
| 2013 | Movie Star Social Club | Host | July 11 – January 15 | |
| 2022 | I Met You Season 3 - I Met a Fireman | Narrator | | |
| 2022 | O Cine | Host | | |
| 2022 | Restaurant in Line | Host | | |
| 2023 | Europe Outside the Tent | Cast Member | Season 2 | |

=== Hosting ===
| Year | Title | Notes | Ref. |
|---|---|---|---|
| 2018–present | Seoul Environmental Film Festival | | |
| 2021 | Opening and closing ceremonies; 19th Gwanghwamun International Short Film Festival | with Kim Tae-hoon | |
| 2022 | closing ceremony 27th Busan International Film Festival | with Han Sun-hwa | |

=== Music video appearances ===
| Year | Song title | Artist(s) | Ref. |
|---|---|---|---|
| 2015 | "Meteor" | Unknown Dress | |

== Theater ==
| Year | Title | Ref. |
|---|---|---|
| 2001 | Camen | |
| 2002 | Our Town | |
| 2002 | A Little Monk | |
| 2002 | West Side Story | |

== Awards and nominations ==
Name of the award ceremony, year presented, category, nominee of the award, and the result of the nomination
| Award ceremony | Year | Category | Nominee / Work | Result | Ref. |
|---|---|---|---|---|---|
| KAFA Feature Film Program 10th Anniversary Awards | 2016 | KAFA's 10 Guards Award (Note: Award presented to 10 actors for their contributions to and for bringing recognition to films produced through the Korean Academy of Film Arts (KAFA) Feature Film Program.) | Ingtoogi: The Battle of Internet Trolls | Won | |
| KBS Drama Awards | 2021 | Best Supporting Actor | Dali and the Cocky Prince | Nominated | |
| Korea Drama Awards | 2017 | Top Excellence Award, Actor | Whisper | Won | |
| MBC Drama Awards | 2016 | Excellence Acting Awards in a Miniseries | One More Happy Ending | Nominated | |
| MBC Entertainment Awards | 2022 | Best Entertainer Award | Omniscient Interfering View | Won | |
| MBC Entertainment Awards | 2022 | Rookie Award in Variety Category | Omniscient Interfering View | Nominated | |
| SBS Drama Awards | 2017 | Excellence Award, Actor in a Monday-Tuesday Drama | Whisper | Won | |
| SBS Drama Awards | 2019 | Excellence Award, Actor in a Mid-Length Drama | Haechi | Nominated | |
| SBS Drama Awards | 2024 | Best Supporting Actor in a Miniseries Genre/Action | Connection | Won | |
| Style Icon Asia | 2016 | Awesome Spotlight | Kwon Yul | Won | |
