= Flying Boys =

- Theatrical poster
- Hangul: 발레 교습소
- Hanja: 발레 敎習所
- RR: Balle gyoseupso
- MR: Palle kyosŭpso
- Directed by: Byun Young-joo
- Written by: Byun Young-joo
- Produced by: Kim Mi-hee
- Starring: Yoon Kye-sang; Kim Min-jung
- Cinematography: Seong Seung-taek
- Edited by: Park Gok-ji
- Music by: Jo Yeong-wook
- Distributed by: CJ Entertainment
- Release date: December 3, 2004
- Running time: 109 minutes
- Country: South Korea
- Language: Korean

Flying Boys is a 2004 South Korean film, written and directed by Byun Young-joo, and starring Yoon Kye-sang and Kim Min-jung. The film had 114,478 admissions in South Korea.

== Plot summary ==
Min-jae is a high school senior who lives with his father, an airline pilot, and is struggling with his studies. For some time he has had a crush on Su-jin, a girl his own age who lives in the same apartment building, but has lacked the courage to approach her. Su-jin, meanwhile, is frustrated with her family life and keen to get away. She plans to become a veterinarian, even though she is no good with animals.

Min-jae and Su-jin are unexpectedly thrown together when they are both pressured into joining a local ballet class. As time passes they get to know each other, as well as the other oddball characters who make up the rest of the class.

== Cast ==
- Yoon Kye-sang as Kang Min-jae
- Kim Min-jung as Hwangbo Su-jin
- Do Ji-won as Jung-sook
- On Joo-wan as Chang-seob
- Lee Joon-gi as Dong-wan
- Greena Park as Seung-eon
- Nah Eun-kyung
- Lee Jong-won
- Kim Dong-wook as Kim Ki-tae
- Kim Kap-soo as supervising teacher (cameo)
