= Beastie Boys (film) =

- Film poster
- Hangul: 비스티 보이즈
- RR: Biseuti boijeu
- MR: Pisŭt'i poijŭ
- Directed by: Yoon Jong-bin
- Written by: Yoon Jong-bin
- Based on: The Moonlight of Seoul – Part Zero by Kim Seung-wook
- Produced by: Kim Young; Jang Won-seok; Yoo Jae-hyeok
- Starring: Yoon Kye-sang; Ha Jung-woo; Yoon Jin-seo
- Cinematography: Go Nak-seon
- Edited by: Kim Woo-il
- Music by: Kim Hong-jib
- Production company: Wire to Wire Films
- Distributed by: Lotte Entertainment
- Release date: April 30, 2008
- Running time: 123 minutes
- Country: South Korea
- Language: Korean
- Box office: US$4.7 million

Beastie Boys (Korean: 비스티 보이즈) is a 2008 South Korean film about male hosts who serve female clients in discreet salons tucked into the affluent fashion districts of southern Seoul.

Its international English title The Moonlight of Seoul is taken from a 1970s short novel by Kim Seung-wook, 서울의 달빛 0장 ("The Moonlight of Seoul – Part Zero"), which explores the aura of Seoul's nightlife.

In director Yoon Jong-bin's own words, the film "depicts youths living in the exotic, affluent backdrop of Gangnam and those kicking and screaming to survive in the superficial, capitalistic society."

== Cast ==
- Yoon Kye-sang as Seung-woo
- Ha Jung-woo as Jae-hyun
- Yoon Jin-seo as Ji-won
- Lee Seung-min as Han-byul
- Ma Dong-seok as Chang-woo
- Yoo Ha-joon as Won-tae
- Kwon Yul as Ji-hoon
- Yoon A-jung as Mi-seon
- Bae Jin-ah as Seon-joo
- Hong Yi-joo as Joo-hee
- Jang Ji-won as Myung-ah
- Jung Bo-hoon as Soon-hee
- Kim Young-hoon as Tae-woo (uncredited)

== Awards and nominations ==
Year	Award	Category	Recipients	Result
2008	17th Buil Film Awards	Best Actor	Ha Jung-woo	Nominated
