= See You in My 19th Life =

2023 South Korean television series

- Promotional poster
- Hangul: 이번 생도 잘 부탁해
- Hanja: 이番 生도 잘 付託해
- Lit.: Please Take Care of Me in This Life as Well
- RR: Ibeon saengdo jal butakhae
- MR: Ibŏn saengdo chal put'akhae
- Genre: Fantasy; Romance
- Based on: See You in My 19th Life by Lee Hye
- Developed by: Studio Dragon (planning)
- Written by: Choi Young-lim
- Directed by: Lee Na-jeong
- Starring: Shin Hye-sun; Ahn Bo-hyun; Ha Yoon-kyung; Ahn Dong-goo
- Music by: LMTH
- Country of origin: South Korea
- Original language: Korean
- No. of episodes: 12

Production
- Executive producers: Kim Sun-tae (CP); Yoo Sang-won; Choi Jin
- Producers: Jung Hyun-wook; Lee Ji-yoon
- Running time: 70 minutes
- Production companies: Studio N; Studio Finecut

Original release
- Network: tvN
- Release: June 17 – July 23, 2023

See You in My 19th Life (Korean: 이번 생도 잘 부탁해) is a 2023 South Korean television series starring Shin Hye-sun, Ahn Bo-hyun, Ha Yoon-kyung, and Ahn Dong-goo. It is based on a webtoon of the same name by writer Lee Hye, which was published on Naver Webtoon. The series aired on tvN from June 17 to July 23, 2023, every Saturday and Sunday at 21:20 (KST). It is also available for streaming on TVING and Netflix in selected regions.

== Synopsis ==
Ban Ji-eum (Shin Hye-sun) has been repeating her life through reincarnation for nearly a thousand years and can remember all of her past lives. After her eighteenth life is cut short due to a tragic accident, she decides to reconnect with the man from her previous life in her nineteenth one.

== Cast ==
=== Main ===
- Shin Hye-sun as Ban Ji-eum: a woman who has a supernatural ability of remembering all of her past lives. She is a member of MI Hotel's strategic planning team.
  - Park So-yi as young Ban Ji-eum
- Ahn Bo-hyun as Moon Seo-ha: the heir of a rich family who suffers from trauma after a car accident. He is the executive director of MI Hotel's strategic planning team.
  - Jung Hyeon-jun as young Moon Seo-ha
- Ha Yoon-kyung as Yoon Cho-won: Joo-won's younger sister who is a landscape architect.
  - Ki So-yu as young Yoon Cho-won
- Ahn Dong-goo as Ha Do-yoon: Seo-ha's secretary and best friend.

=== Supporting ===
==== People around Ji-eum ====
- Cha Chung-hwa as Kim Ae-kyung: owner of Aekyung Kimchi-jjim Restaurant.
- Kang Myung-joo as Jo Yoo-seon: Joo-won and Cho-won's mother.
  - Kim Yoo-mi as young Jo Yoo-seon
- Baek Seung-cheol as Ban Hak-su: Ji-eum's father.
- Moon Dong-hyuk as Ban Dong-woo: Ji-eum's older brother.

==== Ji-eum's past lives ====
- Kim Si-a as Yoon Joo-won: Ji-eum's 18th life who was born in 1986, older sister of Cho-won.
- Lee Jae-kyoon as Kim Jung-ho: Ji-eum's 17th life who was born in 1956, uncle of Ae-kyung who died due to tuberculosis.

==== People around Seo-ha ====
- Lee Bo-young as Lee Sang-ah: Seo-ha's mother who is the former CEO of MI Hotel.
- Choi Jin-ho as Moon Jeong-hun: Seo-ha's father who is the chairman of MI Group.
- Lee Hae-young as Lee Sang-hyeok: Seo-ha's maternal uncle who is the director of MI Group.

==== MI Group ====
- Bae Hae-sun as Jang Yeon-ok: CEO of MI Hotel.
- Bin Chan-wook as Chan-hyuk: Yeon-ok's son.

==== Others ====
- Ryu Hae-joon as Lee Ji-seok: the eldest son of Daehwan Group, a leading conglomerate.
- Lee Chae-min as Kang Min-gi, a part-time worker at Aekyung Kimchi-jjim Restaurant.
- Lee Han-na as Han-na: Min-gi's acquaintance who is a dancer.
- Lee Si-woo as Ha Do-jin: Do-yoon's younger brother.

=== Extended ===
- Go Ha as Go Soo-jin: a member of MI Hotel's strategic planning team.
- Kang Hyeon-oh as Yang-sik: a subordinate who works under the president of a loan company.

=== Special appearance ===
- Chae Jong-hyeop as Bok-dong: Ji-eum's 16th life who was a rickshaw puller during the Japanese colonial era.

== Production ==
It was reported that actress Lim Hyun-joo was initially confirmed to play the role of Yoon Cho-won, but she stepped down from the series due to scheduling issues.

== Original soundtrack ==
=== Part 1 ===
Released on June 18, 2023
No.	Title	Lyrics	Music	Artist	Length
1.	"Silence" (무음)	Hen; Mind	Hen; Luca	Sunwoo Jung-a	3:28
2.	"Silence" (무음; Inst.)		Hen; Luca		3:28
Total length:					6:56

=== Part 2 ===
Released on June 25, 2023
No.	Title	Lyrics	Music	Artist	Length
1.	"Star"	AllThou; Flora	AllThou; Flora; Kim Su-hyun; 153/Joombas; Kang Gun-hoo	Colde	3:41
2.	"Star" (Inst.)		AllThou; Flora; Kim Su-hyun; 153/Joombas; Kang Gun-hoo		3:41
Total length:					7:22

=== Part 3 ===
Released on July 2, 2023
No.	Title	Lyrics	Music	Artist	Length
1.	"Down (Juicy Juicy)"	Oneway; AllThou; Flora; RV	Oneway; AllThou; Flora; RV; 153/Joombas	Jo Yu-ri	3:26
2.	"Down (Juicy Juicy)" (Inst.)		Oneway; AllThou; Flora; RV; 153/Joombas		3:26
Total length:					6:52

=== Part 4 ===
Released on July 9, 2023
No.	Title	Lyrics	Music	Artist	Length
1.	"I'll Embrace Your Past" (너의 지난날을 내가 안아줄게)	Dinner Coat	Dinner Coat; Yoo Jeong-hyun	Ahn Bo-hyun	3:25
2.	"I'll Embrace Your Past" (너의 지난날을 내가 안아줄게; Inst.)		Dinner Coat; Yoo Jeong-hyun		3:25
Total length:					6:50

=== Part 5 ===
Released on July 15, 2023
No.	Title	Lyrics	Music	Artist	Length
1.	"Secret"	Sean Kimm; Even	Sean Kimm; Even; Capu	Yelo	3:07
2.	"Secret" (Inst.)		Sean Kimm; Even; Capu		3:07
Total length:					6:14

=== Part 6 ===
Released on July 23, 2023
No.	Title	Lyrics	Music	Artist	Length
1.	"Here with me"	Aseul	Jeong Gu-hyun	Doyoung	3:14
2.	"Here with me" (Inst.)		Jeong Gu-hyun		3:13
Total length:					6:27

== Viewership ==
See You in My 19th Life : South Korea viewers per episode (thousands)

Season	Episode number												Average
Season	1	2	3	4	5	6	7	8	9	10	11	12	Average
1	1088	1346	1094	1439	1158	1394	997	1111	1095	1018	920	1147	1151

Source: Audience measurement performed nationwide by Nielsen Korea.

Average TV viewership ratings
Ep.	Original broadcast date	Average audience share (Nielsen Korea)	
Ep.	Original broadcast date	Nationwide	Seoul
1	June 17, 2023	4.272% (1st)	4.932% (1st)
2	June 18, 2023	5.488% (1st)	6.078% (1st)
3	June 24, 2023	4.947% (1st)	5.392% (1st)
4	June 25, 2023	5.733% (1st)	6.283% (1st)
5	July 1, 2023	4.454% (1st)	4.701% (1st)
6	July 2, 2023	5.590% (1st)	5.988% (1st)
7	July 8, 2023	4.125% (1st)	5.027% (1st)
8	July 9, 2023	4.481% (1st)	4.789% (1st)
9	July 15, 2023	4.504% (1st)	4.790% (1st)
10	July 16, 2023	4.367% (1st)	4.481% (1st)
11	July 22, 2023	3.501% (1st)	4.199% (1st)
12	July 23, 2023	4.502% (1st)	4.973% (1st)
Average		4.664%	4.786%
In the table above, the blue numbers represent the lowest ratings and the red numbers represent the highest ratings.; This series aired on a cable channel/pay TV which normally has a relatively smaller audience compared to free-to-air TV/public broadcasters (KBS, SBS, MBC, and EBS).
