= One Perfect Day (2013 film) =

2013 South Korean romantic comedy

- Hangul: 사랑의 가위바위보
- RR: Sarangui gawibawibo
- MR: Sarangŭi kawibawibo
- Directed by: Kim Jee-woon
- Written by: Kim Jong-kwan; Kim Jee-woon
- Produced by: Jeong Won-hui
- Starring: Yoon Kye-sang; Park Shin-hye; Park Soo-jin
- Cinematography: Kim Woo-hyung
- Edited by: Lee Jin
- Music by: Mowg
- Production companies: MOG Interactive; Greem Film Company
- Distributed by: Innocean Worldwide
- Release date: April 30, 2013
- Running time: 35 minutes
- Country: South Korea
- Language: Korean

One Perfect Day (Korean: 사랑의 가위바위보; lit. 'Rock, Paper, Scissors of Love') is a 2013 South Korean short film directed by Kim Jee-woon, his first in the romantic comedy genre.

Upon meeting the girl of his dreams (Park Shin-hye), a loser in love (Yoon Kye-sang) asks her to play Rock-paper-scissors with him.

The 35-minute short film first premiered on April 29, 2013, at a showcase in Times Square in Seoul's Yeongdeungpo District, and was then released online on April 30 on the website of outdoor clothing brand Kolon Sport, as well as portal sites Daum and YouTube. One Perfect Day was the second short film after Park Chan-wook's Day Trip to be commissioned and funded by Kolon Sport for its "Way to Nature Film Project," which marks the company's 40th anniversary.

== Plot ==
A man named Un-cheol (Yoon Kye-sang) is looking for a girlfriend. He goes on a series of unsuccessful dates, culminating in a disastrous blind date with Yoo-jin (Park Soo-jin), and his awkward banter, stupid jokes, and complete insensitivity to her feelings, leads Yoo-jin to ditch him while they're playing the game Rock-paper-scissors. In a flashback to Un-cheol's childhood, his father had taught him Rock-paper-scissors and given him some life lessons. As Un-cheol morosely wanders the streets that night, he finds a missing dog, which he returns to its owner, Eun-hee (Park Shin-hye). She insists on giving him a monetary reward, but instead, he asks her to play Rock-paper-scissors with him—if he wins, she goes on a date with him, but if he loses or it's a draw, he walks away and never bothers her again.

== Cast ==
- Yoon Kye-sang as Un-cheol
- Park Shin-hye as Eun-hee
- Park Soo-jin as Yoo-jin
- Ahn Nae-sang as Un-cheol's father
- Kim Beop-rae as Man in trench coat
- Kim Yeo-rin as Innocent girl in the workplace
- Lee Min-ah as Mrs. Kim
- Lee Seon-hee as Jogging woman
- Kim Yoo-joo as Drunk woman
- Baek Hyeon as Man who kisses in the workplace
- Jung Seung-ah as Octagon blind date
- Park So-yeon as Restaurant blind date
- Park Mi-so as Chicago blind date
