= My Dear Desperado =

- South Korean film poster
- Hangul: 내 깡패 같은 애인
- Hanja: 내 깡牌 같은 愛人
- RR: Nae kkangpae gateun aein
- MR: Nae kkangp'ae kat'ŭn aein
- Directed by: Kim Kwang-sik
- Written by: Kim Kwang-sik
- Produced by: Yoon Je-kyoon
- Starring: Park Joong-hoon; Jung Yu-mi
- Cinematography: Go Nak-sun
- Edited by: Lee Jin
- Music by: Mok Young-jin
- Distributed by: Lotte Entertainment
- Release date: May 20, 2010
- Running time: 100 minutes
- Country: South Korea
- Language: Korean
- Budget: US$750,000
- Box office: US$4,214,668

My Dear Desperado (Korean: 내 깡패 같은 애인; RR: Nae kkangpae gateun aein; lit. 'My Gangster-like Lover') is a 2010 South Korean romantic comedy film written and directed by Kim Kwang-sik, and starring Park Joong-hoon and Jung Yu-mi as two people who become semi-basement one-room neighbors: brave yet jobless Se-jin and Dong-chul, the neighborhood gangster who always gets beaten up. The film received 688,832 admissions nationwide.

This film was remade in India in Hindi titled Jayantabhai Ki Luv Story (2013), and in Tamil by Nalan Kumarasamy titled Kadhalum Kadandhu Pogum (2016), for which ₹40 lakh (US$42,000) or ₩71,587,640.57 was paid in copyright fees.

== Plot ==
University graduate Han Se-jin (Jung Yu-mi) leaves her hometown, where her conservative father (Min Kyeong-jin) is the local stationmaster, for Seoul, where she has been offered a job in an IT company. Some time later, however, the company goes bankrupt and she's forced to move into a cheap basement flat while job-hunting. Her new neighbor is middle-aged Oh Dong-chul (Park Joong-hoon), a small-time gangster who works for boss Kim (Jeong Woo-hyeok) collecting loans. Se-jin is initially uncomfortable living next door to a gangster but later forms a wary friendship with him after he helps her out a couple of times. Depressed by her inability to get a job because of the economic recession, Se-jin ends up drinking with Dong-chul one evening and having a one-night stand with him. She later asks him to pose as her wealthy boyfriend on a trip home to visit her anxious father — though that doesn't quite go as planned, and Se-jin ends up staying on with her father. Meanwhile, Dong-chul, who has almost started a gang war back in Seoul by beating up some hapkido athletes in revenge, is told by boss Kim to formally apologize to the athletes' boss, former police detective Park (Jeong In-gi). Dong-cheol reluctantly agrees, but that same day Se-jin is due in Seoul for an important job interview.

== Cast ==
- Park Joong-hoon ... Oh Dong-chul
- Jung Yu-mi ... Han Se-jin
- Park Won-sang ... Jong-seo, the gang deputy
- Jeong Woo-hyeok ... Kim, the gang boss
- Jung In-gi ... Park, the ex-detective
- Kwon Se-in ... Jae-young, the young gangster
- Min Kyeong-jin ... Se-jin's father
- Noh Seung-beom ... Bong-soo
- Lee Sang-hee ... real estate agent
- Im Ki-hong ... Min Ki-ho, the harasser
- Park Jong-hyeon ... interview president
- Lee Jun-hyeok ... final interviewer
- Son Jin-hwan ... final interviewer
- Kim Dong-chan ... uninterested interviewer
- Yu Ji-yeon ... interview leader
- Oh Seong-su ... worker
- Song Gyeong-ui ... section chief
- Lee Chae-eun ... nurse
- Cha Su-mi ... nurse
- Yun Ga-hyeon ... woman inspecting apartment
- Choi Weon-tae ... high school student
- Ju Hyeon-myeong ... high school student
- Shin Hye-jeong ... noodle bar owner
- Min Ji-min ... hapkido athlete
- Jo Weon-cheol ... hapkido athlete
- Kim Yong-min ... hapkido athlete
- Song Yeong-jae ... song-and-dance interviewer
- Han Cheol-woo ... song-and-dance interviewer
- Yang Eun-yong ... doctor
- Kim Mi-ra ... madam

== Awards and nominations ==
Year	Award	Category	Recipient	Result
2010	47th Grand Bell Awards	Best New Director	Kim Kwang-sik	Nominated
2010	31st Blue Dragon Film Awards	Best New Director	Kim Kwang-sik	Won
2010	8th Korean Film Awards	Best New Director	Kim Kwang-sik	Nominated
2010	8th Korean Film Awards	Best Screenplay	Kim Kwang-sik	Nominated
2010	8th Korean Film Awards	Best Actor	Park Joong-hoon	Nominated
2010	8th Korean Film Awards	Best Actress	Jung Yu-mi	Nominated
2011	47th Baeksang Arts Awards	Best New Director	Kim Kwang-sik	Nominated
2011	33rd Golden Cinematography Awards	Best Actress	Jung Yu-mi	Won

== Remakes ==
The film was made into two Indian-language films as Jayantabhai Ki Luv Story (2013) in Hindi, and Kadhalum Kadandhu Pogum (2016) in Tamil. The movie also partially inspired the 2014 Bangladeshi film Kistimaat.
