= Jayantabhai Ki Luv Story =

2013 film by Vinnil Markan

Jayanta Bhai Ki Luv Story
- Theatrical release poster
- Directed by: Vinnil Markan
- Screenplay by: Kiran Kotrial
- Produced by: Kumar S. Taurani
- Starring: Vivek Oberoi; Neha Sharma
- Cinematography: Santosh Thundiyil
- Edited by: Manish More
- Music by: Songs: Sachin–Jigar; Background Score: Raju Singh
- Production company: Tips Industries
- Distributed by: Tips Industries
- Release date: 15 February 2013
- Country: India
- Language: Hindi

Jayantabhai Ki Luv Story (transl. Jayantabhai's Love Story) is a 2013 Indian Hindi romantic comedy film directed by Vinnil Markan and produced by Kumar S. Taurani under the banner of Tips Industries. The film stars Vivek Oberoi opposite Neha Sharma in lead roles. The theatrical trailer was unveiled on 11 January 2013, whilst the film was released on 15 February 2013. The film is a remake of the 2010 South Korean film My Gangster Lover. The film was released to mixed-to-positive reviews.

== Plot ==
The film begins with a prologue of Mumbai and how the city transforms the lives of people. Simran Desai is an engineering graduate who leaves for Mumbai to pursue a career in the IT sector, with only the support of her father. She soon joins an IT company and becomes well-settled in life. Things take a toll when the company she works for shuts down suddenly five months later. She faces financial hardship and is forced to move into a low-cost housing colony while searching for a new job. Her neighbour is Abhimanyu, aka Jayanta Bhai. Simran discovers that Jayanta Bhai is a gangster who works for a don Althaf Bhai. His only aim in life is to own a bar of his own. He had just been released from prison after serving a five-year sentence for taking the blame for a crime he did not commit on the orders of the don. Jayanta did the deed on the promise that his status within the don's gang will be elevated once he is released, but the promise was reneged.

Though Simran is initially disdainful of Jayanta's roguish behavior, she gradually warms up to him after he takes her to a hospital all the way on his back when she overdoses on vitamin supplements and passes out in her room. Realizing Jayanta's friendly, caring, and humorous nature despite his gangster background, she begins to develop romantic affections for him. Their relationship nurtures to the point that they end up having sex one day while drunk.

Facing pressure from her father over her career and wedding, Simran introduces Jayanta to him as her boyfriend, who is a successful manager in an IT firm. Her father decides to fix their marriage but changes his mind after seeing Jayanta thrashing a man at a party, realising that he is a rowdy. He bars Simran from returning to Mumbai, even forbidding her to attend an important job interview. Meanwhile, Jayanta starts a gang war by beating up the henchmen of a rival gangster, Alex Pandian, who is a former police officer. Althaf Bhai decides that Jayanta should murder Alex. After ensuring that Simran attends her interview, Jayanta proceeds with the plan to murder Alex. Jayanta succeeds in killing Alex, but gets stabbed with a rebar and is left to bleed to death.

Six months later, Simran has become a director in her company and has moved out of the housing colony. She constantly thinks about Jayanta, whom she had never seen again after her interview. Simran yearns to show Jayanta her new life, knowing that he is the one person who will be happier than even herself in her having achieved her dreams. She soon finds Jayanta working at a petrol bunk, having survived his murder attempt and abandoned his rowdy past. The two embrace each other and reunite, starting a new life together.

== Cast ==
- Vivek Oberoi as Abhimanyu aka Jayanta Bhai
- Neha Sharma as Simran Desai
- Nassar as Alex Pandian
- Zakir Hussain as Altaf Bhai
- Raj Singh Arora as Kunal (Kunu)
- Rahul Singh as Datta
- Vikas Shrivastav as Inspector Parab

== Release ==
The film was expected to be released in summer 2012. In July 2012, the film's posters were released as a promotion for the film, in which it was also announced that the film had been scheduled to be released in October 2012. The film's distributors, Tips Music Films released a song promo of the film, "Aa Bhi Ja Mere Mehermann" by Atif Aslam, in November.

== Soundtrack ==
Jayantabhai Ki Luv Story

Soundtrack album by Sachin–Jigar
- Released: 2013
- Genre: Feature film soundtrack
- Label: Tips

Sachin–Jigar chronology
ABCD: Any Body Can Dance (2013)	Jayantabhai Ki Luv Story (2013)	I, Me Aur Main (2013)

The music of the film was directed by Sachin–Jigar, while the lyrics are penned by Priya Panchal and Mayur Puri.

Track #	Song	Lyrics	Singer(s)	Length
1	"Aa Bhi Ja Mere Mehermaan"	Priya Panchal	Atif Aslam	4:45
2	"Thoda Thoda"	Priya Panchal	Shreya Ghoshal, Sachin Sanghvi	4:34
3	"Dil Na Jaane Kyun"	Priya Panchal	Atif Aslam, Anushka Manchanda	3:50
4	"Hai Na"	Mayur Puri	Atif Aslam, Priya Panchal	3:42

== Reception ==
A critic from The Times of India rated the film 3/5 and wrote, "The screenplay is average, and it waits a while to take off. And we wish it had a bit more ‘Ram Leela’ (read: drama in bhai lingo), but overall it entertains". A critic from Filmfare.com wrote, "So, if you’re up for watching this film, do leave your brains behind. And if you’ve got a better Valentine’s weekend planned ahead, grab it with both your hands and legs". A critic from Filmfare rated the film 2.5/5 and wrote, "Jayantabhai Ki Luv Story will not disappoint you if you are emotionally inclined to love stories". A critic from Rediff.com rated the film 1/5 stars and wrote, "The problem with JKLS is that it ties not only the audience but also the actors of the film in a tight knot of which neither the plot nor performances, except Oberoi's, help to break out of".
