= The Wind Blows (TV series) =

2019 South Korean television series

- Promotional poster
- Hangul: 바람이 분다
- RR: Barami bunda
- MR: Parami punda
- Genre: Melodrama
- Written by: Hwang Joo-ha
- Directed by: Jung Jung-hwa
- Starring: Kam Woo-sung; Kim Ha-neul; Kim Sung-cheol; Kim Ga-eun
- Country of origin: South Korea
- Original language: Korean
- No. of episodes: 16

Production
- Executive producers: Lee Joo-kyung; Park Jun-seo
- Running time: 70 minutes
- Production companies: Drama House Studio; Salt Light Media

Original release
- Network: JTBC
- Release: May 27 – July 16, 2019

The Wind Blows (Korean: 바람이 분다; RR: Barami bunda) is a 2019 South Korean television series starring Kam Woo-sung, Kim Ha-neul, Kim Sung-cheol, and Kim Ga-eun. It aired on JTBC's Mondays and Tuesdays at 21:30 (KST) from May 27 to July 16, 2019.

== Synopsis ==
Do-hoon divorced Soo-jin when he learned that he had Alzheimer's disease. They meet again five years later and Soo-jin learned the reason that lead to the divorce back then. She suffered to overcome the pain and decided to be by Do-hoon's side once again.

== Cast ==
=== Main ===
- Kam Woo-sung as Kwon Do-hoon
- Kim Ha-neul as Lee Soo-jin
- Kim Sung-cheol as Bryan Jung
- Kim Ga-eun as Son Ye-rim

=== Supporting ===
- Lee Jun-hyeok as Choi Hang-seo
- Yoon Ji-hye as Baek Soo-ah
- Park Hyo-joo as Jo Mi-kyung
- Kim Young-jae as Moon Kyung-hoon
- Lee Hang-na as Kim Hee-eun
- Jeon Guk-hyang as Soo-jin's mother
- Choi Hwi-do as Lee Soo-chul
- Kim Ik-tae as Do-hoon's doctor
- Han Ji-hyun as Lee Sun-kyung, Son Ye-rim's co-worker
- Ahn Dong-goo as young Kwon Do-hoon
- Jung Da-eun as young Lee Soo-in.
- Hong Je-yi as Lee Ah Ram Soo Jin's daughter

=== Special appearances ===
- Jo Woo-ri as Choi Seung-yeon (Ep. 3–4)
- Seol Jung-hwan as Kim Ji-hoon (Ep.7–8, 11)

== Production ==
The first script reading took place on March 21, 2019.

== Viewership ==
The Wind Blows : South Korea viewers per episode (thousands)

| Season | Episode number | | | | | | | | | | | | | | | | Average |
| Season | 1 | 2 | 3 | 4 | 5 | 6 | 7 | 8 | 9 | 10 | 11 | 12 | 13 | 14 | 15 | 16 | Average |
|---|---|---|---|---|---|---|---|---|---|---|---|---|---|---|---|---|---|
| 1 | 775 | 849 | 621 | 620 | 698 | 746 | 873 | 1052 | 1097 | 1205 | 823 | 704 | 748 | 657 | 698 | 709 | 805 |

Source: Audience measurement performed nationwide by Nielsen Media Research.

Average TV viewership ratings
| Ep. | Original broadcast date | Average audience share (AGB Nielsen) | |
| Ep. | Original broadcast date | Nationwide | Seoul |
|---|---|---|---|
| 1 | May 27, 2019 | 3.598% | 3.594% |
| 2 | May 28, 2019 | 4.024% | 4.627% |
| 3 | June 3, 2019 | 3.005% | 3.261% |
| 4 | June 4, 2019 | 3.157% | 3.464% |
| 5 | June 10, 2019 | 3.489% | 4.217% |
| 6 | June 11, 2019 | 3.880% | 4.015% |
| 7 | June 17, 2019 | 4.749% | 5.409% |
| 8 | June 18, 2019 | 5.204% | 5.801% |
| 9 | June 24, 2019 | 5.170% | 5.843% |
| 10 | June 25, 2019 | 5.662% | 5.829% |
| 11 | July 1, 2019 | 4.119% | 4.377% |
| 12 | July 2, 2019 | 3.577% | 3.732% |
| 13 | July 8, 2019 | 3.895% | 4.458% |
| 14 | July 9, 2019 | 3.483% | 3.957% |
| 15 | July 15, 2019 | 3.669% | 3.809% |
| 16 | July 16, 2019 | 3.816% | 3.989% |
| Average | | 4.031% | 4.399% |
In the table above, the blue numbers represent the lowest ratings and the red numbers represent the highest ratings.; This drama aired on a cable channel/pay TV which normally has a relatively smaller audience compared to free-to-air TV/public broadcasters (KBS, SBS, MBC and EBS).

== Awards and nominations ==
| Year | Award | Category | Recipient | Result | Ref. |
|---|---|---|---|---|---|
| 2019 | 12th Korea Drama Awards | Top Excellence Award, Actress | Kim Ha-neul | Nominated | |
