= Ahn Dong-goo =

South Korean actor (born 1993)

- Born: Ahn Dong-goo; 2 November 1993 (age 33); South Korea
- Education: Hanyang University – BA in Theater and Film
- Occupation: Actor
- Years active: 2019–present
- Agent: Ace Factory

Korean name
- Hangul: 안동구
- RR: An Donggu
- MR: An Tonggu

Ahn Dong-goo (Korean: 안동구; born November 2, 1993) is a South Korean actor. He is known for his roles in dramas Our Beloved Summer, Snowdrop, The Law Cafe and See You in My 19th Life.

== Biography ==
He was born on November 2, 1993, in South Korea. He attended Hanyang University to study theater.

== Career ==
He is signed under Ace Factory.

In 2019 he made his acting debut in drama The Wind Blows.

In 2020 he appeared in drama When the Weather Is Fine and Soul Mechanic. The same year he appeared in drama Sweet Home as Lee Soo-woong. He appeared in movie Subject, he starred as Hyun-sung which left a strong impression on the audience at the 'Mise-en-scene's Short Film Festival' and the movie was shown at 24th Bucheon International Fantastic Film Festival and The 19th Mise-en-scene Short Film Festival which received favorable reviews.

== Filmography ==
=== Film ===
Year	Title	Role	Ref.
2017	Black Summer	Ji-hyeon's junior	
2020	Subject	Hyun-sung	
TBA	It's Okay to Breathe Next to You	Lee Wan	

=== Television series ===
Year	Title	Role	Notes	Ref.
2019	The Wind Blows	Kwon Do-hoon		
2020	When the Weather Is Fine	Cha Yoon-taek		
2020	Soul Mechanic	Noh Woo-jung		
2021–2022	Our Beloved Summer	Ga Eun-ho		
2021–2022	Snowdrop	Choi Byung-tae		
2022	The Law Cafe	Seo Eun-kang		
2023	Divorce Attorney Shin	Jung Ji-hoon	Special appearance	
2023	See You in My 19th Life	Ha Do-yoon		

=== Web series ===
Year	Title	Role	Notes	Ref.
2020	Sweet Home	Lee Soo-woong	Season 1	
2021	The Silent Sea	Employee		
