= Lovers of Six Years =

- Hangul: 6년째 연애중
- RR: 6nyeonjjae yeonaejung
- MR: 6nyŏntchae yŏnaejung
- Directed by: Park Hyun-jin
- Written by: Park Hyun-jin; Yang Hyeon-chan; Park Beom-soo
- Produced by: Yang Hyeon-chan; Park Se-jun
- Starring: Kim Ha-neul; Yoon Kye-sang
- Cinematography: Park Yong-soo
- Edited by: Park Gok-ji
- Music by: Kim Joon-seok
- Distributed by: Studio 2.0
- Release date: February 5, 2008
- Running time: 112 minutes
- Country: South Korea
- Language: Korean
- Budget: US$2.8 million

Lovers of Six Years (Korean: 6년째 연애중; RR: 6nyeonjjae yeonaejung) is a 2008 South Korean film starring Kim Ha-neul and Yoon Kye-sang as a couple in their late twenties who've been dating for six years, whose relationship faces difficult new tests.

== Plot ==
Jae-young and Da-jin have been going out for 6 years. Living in apartments next door to each other, Da-jin is an editor at a publishing company while Jae-young works as a producer for a home shopping network. Their sex life is not as hot as before, but they're comfortable in their relationship and know everything about each other. Da-jin doesn't mind asking Jae-young to buy tampons for her, and Jae-young visits Da-jin's mother from time to time to repair the house or just to say hello.

One day, Jae-young meets a younger, attractive temp who frankly expresses her interest in him, while at work Da-jin hires a charming new illustrator with whom she shares a lot in common. When these new people enter their lives, cracks in Da-jin and Jae-young's long-term relationship begin to show.

== Cast ==
- Kim Ha-neul as Lee Da-jin
- Yoon Kye-sang as Kim Jae-young
- Shin Sung-rok as Lee Jin-seong
- Cha Hyun-jung as Lee Ji-eun
- Ok Ji-young as Lee Mi-young
- Seo Dong-won as Kim Min-jae
- Kim Hye-ok as Da-jin's mother
- Jung Yoon-min as Kwon Sung-cheol
- Jo Hyang-gi as PD Choi
- Kim Nan-hwi as Team leader Yoon
- Kim Jae-rok as Department chief Kim
- Lee Sang-yeob as Yoon-seok
- Jung Dong-gyu as CEO
- Jin Yong-wook as man in rear-end collision
- Park Young as real estate agent
- Jo Yong-joon as record store clerk
- Lee Dae-yeon as Da-jin's doctor
- Kil Yong-woo as hair band man
