= You're My Pet (film) =

2011 South Korean film

- Theatrical release poster
- Hangul: 너는 펫
- RR: Neoneun pet
- MR: Nŏnŭn p'et
- Directed by: Kim Byeong-kon
- Based on: Kimi wa Petto by Yayoi Ogawa
- Starring: Kim Ha-neul; Jang Keun-suk; Ryu Tae-joon; Jeong Yu-mi
- Distributed by: Lotte Entertainment; Toho (Japan)
- Release date: November 10, 2011
- Running time: 110 minutes
- Country: South Korea
- Language: Korean
- Box office: US$7 million

You're My Pet (Korean: 너는 펫; RR: Neoneun pet) is a 2011 South Korean romantic comedy film based on the manga Tramps Like Us (known in Japanese as You're My Pet) by Yayoi Ogawa. Directed by Kim Byeong-kon, it co-stars Kim Ha-neul and Jang Keun-suk. It is released on 10 November 2011 by Lotte and ran at 110 minutes.

== Plot ==
The film centers around a young and ambitious woman named Ji Eun-yi (Kim Ha-neul) and her human pet (Jang Keun-suk).

After her fiancé leaves her for his mistress and Ji Eun-yi is demoted at work, she stumbles across a young injured homeless man in a box outside her condominium. She takes him in and becomes attached to him. As a joke, she says she wants to keep him as a pet, and to her surprise, the young man agrees. She names him Momo, after her beloved dog from her childhood. Ji Eun-yi provides room and board, and Momo provides unconditional love and loyalty. Momo, whose name is Kang In-ho, is a dance child prodigy who gradually brings happiness to his master's life.

Despite his growing affection for her, Ji Eun-yi says there is no romance of any sort in their relationship. However, sexual tension gradually arises as the two spend more time together. But not only does Ji Eun-yi struggle with her feelings for the young guy, she also needs to keep him a secret from her co-workers, especially her former college classmate and new romantic interest Woo-seong.

== Cast ==
- Kim Ha-neul as Ji Eun-yi
- Jang Keun-suk as Kang In-ho
- Ryu Tae-joon as Cha Woo-seong
- Jeong Yu-mi as Lee Young-eun
- Kang Ha-neul as Young-soo
- Choi Jong-hoon as Ji Eun-soo
- Kang Hae-in as Kim Mi-sung
- Go Woo-ri as Lee Min Sun

== Reception ==
In Korea, the film sold 209,318 tickets in the first five days, ranked fourth and grossed ₩1.8 billion in its first week of release and grossed a total closed to ₩3.8 billion after four weeks of screening.

In Japan, the film was released on 21 January 2012 by Toho. It ranked fifth and grossed ¥68 million in its first week of release and grossed a total of ¥281 million after three weeks on 92 screens.
