= Kim Kwang-sik =

South Korean film director and screenwriter

- Born: March 6, 1972 (age 54); South Korea
- Occupations: Film director, screenwriter
- Years active: 1997-present

Korean name
- Hangul: 김광식
- RR: Gim Gwangsik
- MR: Kim Kwangsik

Kim Kwang-sik (born March 6, 1972) is a South Korean film director and screenwriter. He directed the romantic comedy My Dear Desperado (2010) and the crime thriller Tabloid Truth (2014).

== Career ==
=== Early works ===
Kim Kwang-sik first began working as a screenwriter in 1997, on the television drama Snail starring Lee Jung-jae and Lee Mi-sook. He then wrote the screenplays for Inner Circle (1999), Last Statement (2002), and road movie Off Road (2007), as well as being the co-writer of the 2009 period drama series The Return of Iljimae starring Jung Il-woo. Kim was also the first assistant director on Lee Chang-dong's award-winning Oasis (2002).

=== My Dear Desperado ===
For his 2010 directorial debut, Kim cast veteran actor Park Joong-hoon opposite ingenue Jung Yu-mi in My Dear Desperado. Titled "My Gangster Lover" in Korean, the film is about a recent college graduate from a rural town who's having trouble finding a job in Seoul, so she moves into a cheap basement apartment, which happens to be next door to a middle-aged, third-rate gangster. Critics called My Dear Desperado a "likeably offbeat" character-driven romance and "one of the discoveries of Korean cinema in 2010," praising it for Kim's "enjoyably unaffected" direction and "fluid handling" of his own script, the strong acting and chemistry between its two leads, the smooth transition from comedy to pathos, and a casual realism of setting and style that's evocative of ordinary, real people (despite fitting within the conventions of a romantic comedy). With minimal marketing and no major stars, the film struggled to attract attention upon its theatrical release. But it gradually built up positive word of mouth, and managed to sell close to a modest 700,000 tickets, enough to ensure the filmmakers a healthy profit (it was produced by Yoon Je-kyoon). Kim won Best New Director at the Blue Dragon Film Awards, and received New Director and Screenplay nominations from the Grand Bell Awards and Korean Film Awards.

Kim would later make a cameo appearance in Park's first film as a director, Top Star (2013).

=== Tabloid Truth ===
In 2014, Kim directed Tabloid Truth, starring Kim Kang-woo, Jung Jin-young, Ko Chang-seok and Park Sung-woong. The crime thriller begins with the apparent suicide of a promising actress due to false, malicious rumors, and as her manager risks his life by seeking the truth behind them, he uncovers a vast conspiracy of power, money and sex, where faceless people from every field of society, such as financial firms, public relations agencies, and government organizations, are authors of jjirasi (from the Japanese word chirashi, meaning "leaflet"). Jjirasi are secretive online newsletters that navigate the sketchy underbellies of politics, business and showbiz, read voraciously by stock investors and tabloid journalists who pay for them; fact and fiction are selectively picked, processed and published to shape public opinion and further particular agendas. Fascinated by the subject of jjirasi—what it is, how it came about, and who circulates it—Kim chased sources, but doing his research was difficult because the "rumor makers behind the scenes" refused to reveal their identities. He eventually found a "distributor" and an "information collector" who were willing to be interviewed, and coupled with an in-depth look into timely scandals such as the suicides of Jang Ja-yeon and Choi Jin-sil, Kim used the information to make the movie more realistic despite the backdrop of fictional events. Reviews praised Kim for the slow-building intensity in his directorial approach, his "deft" rendering of fight and chase scenes, and for "convincingly dramatizing" the ruthless competition between jjirasi writers and the destructive nature of their information. But some critics also pointed out the limitations of Tabloid Truth as merely a predictable action thriller, though Kim said he intended to make an "entertaining film rather than a serious one with social commentary."

== Filmography ==
- The Great Battle (2018) - director
- Tabloid Truth (2014) - director, script editor
- Top Star (2013) - cameo as DP
- The Suicide Forecast (2011) - cameo as dead body 2
- My Dear Desperado (2010) - director, screenplay
- Off Road (2007) - screenplay
- Oasis (2002) - 1st assistant director
- Last Statement (2002) - screenplay
- Inner Circle (1999) - screenplay
- 3PM Paradise Bath House (1997) - script editor

== Television ==
- The Return of Iljimae (MBC, 2009) - screenplay
- Snail (SBS, 1997) - screenplay

== Awards ==
- 2010 31st Blue Dragon Film Awards: Best New Director (My Dear Desperado)
