= Noriko Iriyama =

Japanese actress and model

- 入山 法子
- Born: 1 August 1985 (age 40); Saitama, Japan
- Occupations: Actress, model
- Years active: 2004–present
- Agent: INCENT
- Height: 1.68 m (5 ft 6 in)
- Spouse: Kōshū Okamine (m. 2014; div. 2020)

Noriko Iriyama (入山 法子) (born 1 August 1985 in the former Urawa, Saitama) is a Japanese actress and model. She graduated from Kyoritsu Women's University in 2008.

== Filmography ==
=== Film ===
- Happy Flight (2008)
- Kōfuku no Alibi (2016)
- The Flower in the Sky (2022), Keiko Hagiwara
- Angel Flight: The Movie (2026), Mai Lambert

=== Television ===
- My Boss My Hero (2006)
- The Pride of the Temp (2007)
- Kaibutsu-kun (2010, ep.5)
- Kimi wa Pet (2017)
- Tramps Like Us (2017)
- My Little Monster (2018)
- Invisible (2022) as Naoko Fukutome (ep. 2)
- Ranman (2023) as Toyoka, former Yanagibashi geisha
- Light of My Lion (2024) as Kasumi Sugano
