= Tramps Like Us =

Japanese manga series and its adaptations

- First tankōbon volume cover

きみはペット (Kimi wa Pet)
- Genre: Comedy, Romance
- Manga
- Written by: Yayoi Ogawa
- Published by: Kodansha
- English publisher: NA: Tokyopop (former); Kodansha USA (current)
- Magazine: Kiss
- Original run: 2000 – 2005
- Volumes: 14
- Television drama
- Original network: TBS
- Original run: April 9, 2003 – June 18, 2003
- Episodes: 10

Tramps Like Us (Japanese: きみはペット, Hepburn: Kimi wa Petto; lit. 'You're A Pet'), also known as You're My Pet, is a Japanese manga series written and illustrated by Yayoi Ogawa. It is about Sumire, a young professional woman who takes in a younger man as a pet, and her attempts to keep her coworkers and conventionally perfect boyfriend from finding out about her pet. It also deals with the romantic attraction between Sumire and her pet.

It was serialized by Kodansha and was released in 14 volumes between 2000 and 2005, with an additional side-story volume being released in 2002. The volumes, barring the side-story volume, were published in English and German by Tokyopop, in French by Kurokawa and in Italian by Star Comics. The manga was adapted to a TV drama series that aired in Japan on TBS in 2003, and a South Korean film in 2011. The manga is adapted to a second, reboot, TV drama series aired on Fuji TV in 2017 with a new cast.

== Plot ==
Sumire Iwaya (巌谷 澄麗, Iwaya Sumire), a journalist at a major newspaper, is a career woman in a society that does not handle successful women well. Sumire has depression and anxiety. She also has hobbies that are very un-feminine, such as smoking, being a fan of pro wrestling, K-1, and anime.

After her fiancé leaves her for his mistress and Sumire is demoted at work, she stumbles across a young injured homeless man in a box outside her condominium. She takes him in and becomes attached to him. As a joke, she says she wants to keep him as a pet. To her surprise, the young man agrees. She names him Momo (モモ), after her beloved dog from childhood. Sumire provides room and board, and Momo provides unconditional love and loyalty. Sumire says there is no sex in their relationship, and she will only sleep with men who have the "three highs": higher pay, higher education and higher height (i.e. taller than her 170 cm.) Despite this, there is definite sexual tension in their relationship.

Sumire later learns that Momo's real name is Takeshi Gouda (合田 武志, Gōda Takeshi), and that he is a dance prodigy who studied classical ballet but was too short to take the lead roles. He switched to modern dance, and lived a semi-homeless life before meeting Sumire. When it is revealed that he and Sumire know one another, Momo passes himself off as Sumire's second cousin.

Complications arise when Sumire is reunited with the man with whom she was infatuated during her time at Tokyo University, Shigehito Hasumi (蓮實 滋人, Hasumi Shigehito). Hasumi meets all of Sumire's requirements. However, Sumire cannot quite open up to Hasumi-senpai, or give up her attachment to Momo. For example, Sumire lets Momo call her by her personal name, while she struggles to let Hasumi call her "Iwaya" instead of "Iwaya-san". Takeshi (a.k.a. Momo) starts to have feelings for Sumire as well and they began to have feelings that go way beyond those of a pet and its Master.

When Hasumi meets Momo, he recognizes Momo's face but cannot put a name to him. When Hasumi does some research on Iwaya-san's so-called cousin, he discovers that Takeshi was a child ballet prodigy and becomes friends with him. Takeshi, of course, has to keep the fact that he is also "Momo" to himself, even when Hasumi repeatedly brings up the topic of Sumire's pet in their conversations. Although, at times he changes personalities; something is up with Momo!

== Development ==
Originally, Momo was meant to have a much more animal-like personality, and Ogawa considers him one of her easiest characters to draw, describing his character type as being one of her 'stock characters'.

== Media ==
=== Manga ===
The chapters of Tramps Like Us were written and illustrated by Yayoi Ogawa. The series first appeared as a single chapter work, named Pet, that appeared in the June 2000 issue of Kiss Carnival, where it ran for four chapters. It was then transferred to Kiss later in 2000 where it ran until 2005. It was renamed to Kimi wa Pet after the fifth chapter.

The 82 chapters, called "Rules", were collected and published in 14 bound volumes by Kodansha between December 2000 and December 2005. An additional volume called Kimi Wa Pet The Best (きみはペット THE BEST) was released in October 2002. In early 2004, "Supplement: Kimiwa Pet" was included as a free extra with Kiss. A special edition of the eleventh volume was offered which included a toy shaped like Momo. In 2009, the manga was re-released in a nine-volume edition under the title Tramps Like Us L'integrale (きみはペット L'integrale).

Tokyopop licensed the series for English-language release in North America and gave the series its English name of Tramps Like Us. It released the first volume in August 2004 and the final volume in February 2008. As of August 31, 2009, the English editions are out of print. Kodansha USA re-released the entire series for English-language digital publication in June 2019, under the name You're My Pet. The series was published as Tramps Like Us - Kimi Wa Pet by Tokyopop Germany between November 2004 and February 2007. It was published as Kimi Wa Pet - Au pied, chéri! in French by Kurokawa between September 2005 and November 2007. It was published in Italian by Star Comics between July 2004 and September 2006 as Sei Il Mio Cucciolo!.

=== 2003 live-action drama ===
A live-action Japanese drama series of ten episodes aired on TBS between April and June 2003. The opening and closing theme was "Darling" by V6. Sumire was played by Koyuki and Momo was played by Jun Matsumoto.

No.	Japanese Title	English Title	Original release date
1	Transliteration: "Bishōnen no kaikata" (美少年の飼い方)	How to Housebreak a Young Man	April 16, 2003
2	Transliteration: "petto no kōnō" (ペットの効能)	Benefit of a Pet	April 23, 2003
3	Transliteration: "kareshi VS petto (osu)" (彼氏VSペット(♂))	Boyfriend vs Pet	April 30, 2003
4	Transliteration: "ren'ai kansenshō" (恋愛感染症)	Infectious Love	May 7, 2003
Momo returns and Sumire is relieved.
5	Transliteration: "shitsukete ageru" (しつけてあげる)	I'll Train You	May 14, 2003
6	Transliteration: "kaiinu ni kamareta yoru" (飼い犬に噛まれた夜)	The Night I Was Bitten By My Pet Dog	May 21, 2003
7	Transliteration: "ouchi e kaerō" (おうちへかえろう)	Let's Go Home	May 28, 2003
8	Transliteration: "moratoriamu no shuuen" (モラトリアムの終焉)	Demise of the Moratorium	June 4, 2003
9	Transliteration: "saigo no yoru ni" (最後の夜に)	On the Last Night	June 11, 2003
10	Transliteration: "rakuen kara no tabidachi" (楽園からの旅立ち)	Leaving the Garden of Eden	June 18, 2003

=== Film ===
The manga was adapted into a live-action South Korean film You're My Pet (너는팻), which was released in late 2011 and starred Kim Ha-neul and Jang Keun-suk.

=== 2017 live-action drama ===
A new adaptation aired from February 6, 2017, to March 26, 2017, on Fuji TV. It stars Noriko Iriyama as Sumire and Jun Shison as Momo. The new adaptation runs for 16 episodes.

No.	Japanese Title	English Title	Original release date
1	Transliteration: "Bishōnen no kaikata" (美少年の飼い方)	How to Housebreak a Young Man	February 6, 2017
2	Transliteration: "petto no kōnō" (ペットの効能)	Benefit of a Pet	February 13, 2017
3	Transliteration: "hajimete no otoko VS petto" (初めての男vsペット)	First Guy vs Pet	February 20, 2017
4	Transliteration: "tanjōbi no sugoshikata" (誕生日の過ごし方)	How to Spend a Birthday	February 27, 2017
5	Transliteration: "hanarete ite mo omottemasu" (離れていても想ってます)	I Think Even if I'm away	March 13, 2017
6	Transliteration: "tadashii amae-kata" (正しい甘え方)	Corrected Spoilings	March 27, 2017
7	Transliteration: "uchi e kaerō" (うちへ帰ろう)	Let's Go Home	April 3, 2017
8	Transliteration: "kakegae no nai sonzai" (かけがえのない存在)	Irreplaceable	April 10, 2017
9	Transliteration: "arinomama no kimi o aishiteru" (ありのままの君を愛してる)	I Love You as You Are	May 1, 2017
10	Transliteration: "kainushi shikkaku!?" (飼い主失格!?)	Disqualified Owner !?	May 8, 2017
11	Transliteration: "faito!" (Fight!)	Fight!	May 15, 2017
12	Transliteration: "kare no inu ma ni..." (彼の居ぬ間に...)	While He Was Away...	May 22, 2017
13	Transliteration: "suitchi...on" (スイッチ...ON)	Switch...ON	May 29, 2017
14	Transliteration: "baibai, momo..." (バイバイ、モモ...)	Farewell, Momo...	June 5, 2017
15	Transliteration: "amai yumekarasamete..." (甘い夢から覚めて...)	Awoken from a Sweet Dream...	June 12, 2017
16	Transliteration: "ame no hi no yakusoku" (雨の日の約束)	Promise of a Rainy Day	June 19, 2017

== Reception ==
The manga won the 2003 Kodansha Manga Award for shōjo manga. Tramps Like Us has been described by Sequential Tart as "one of the best of these josei manga titles currently available in English translation". Johanna Draper Carlson says that the theme of the series is "understanding what's really important about relationships".

Sumire enjoys both her job and her romance with Hasumi, unlike depictions of female characters in the 1980s and 1990s. Women, and therefore, female characters, have begun to change their ideal of a husband, from the "three highs" (tall, high income, well-educated) to seeking a more "comfortable, cooperative, and compatible" sort of a man.

Hasumi is said to represent the former, and Momo the latter kind of a man, making it significant that eventually, Sumire chooses Momo. Ed Chavez, reviewing the first volume, described Sumire's 'needy nature' as being easy to relate to, but found her frustratingly "emotionally weak and self-destructive" by the sixth volume, much preferring to see her 'kicking ass'.

George Galuschak, writing for Kliatt found that 'certain aspects of Sumire and Momo's relationship creeped [Galuchack] out', although he described the first volume overall as being a 'funny, entertaining read'. Jason Thompson has described Tramps Like Us as a classic of josei, noting its presentation of "a fairytale romance" makes it unlike Suppli, which is more realistic in its depiction of work. As of 2016, the manga had 4.2 million copies in print in Japan.
