= Kim Ha-neul =

South Korean actress (born 1978)

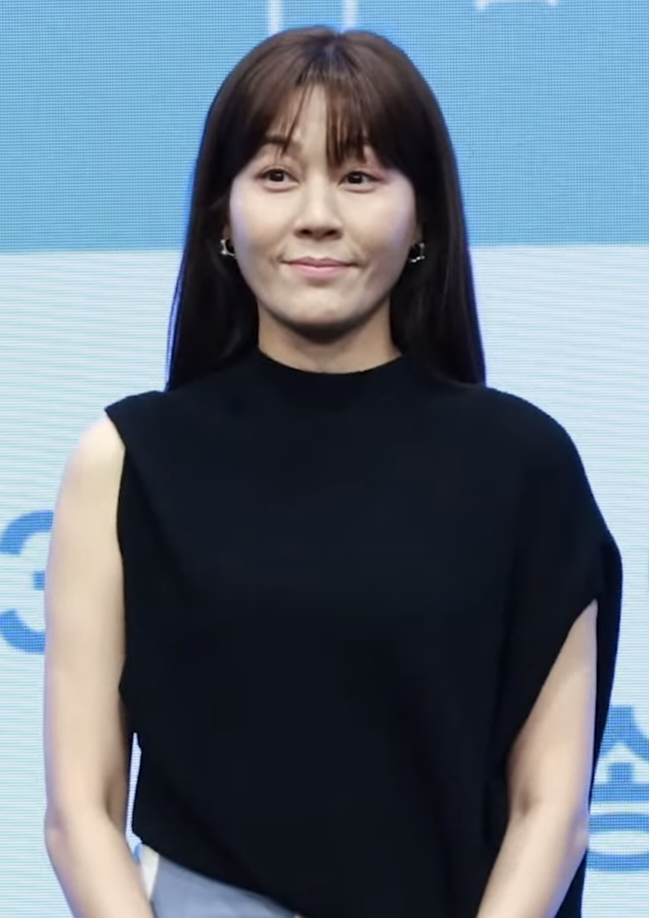
- Kim in March 2024
- Born: February 21, 1978 (age 48); Seoul, South Korea
- Education: Seoul Institute of the Arts (BFA in Film)
- Occupation: Actress
- Years active: 1996–present
- Agent: Billions
- Spouse: Choi Jin-hyuk (m. 2016)
- Children: 1

Korean name
- Hangul: 김하늘
- RR: Gim Haneul
- MR: Kim Hanŭl

Kim Ha-neul (Korean: 김하늘; born February 21, 1978) is a South Korean actress. After starting her career as a model, she rose to fame by starring in the films Ditto (2000), My Tutor Friend (2003), Too Beautiful to Lie (2004), and My Girlfriend Is an Agent (2009). In 2011, Kim won Best Actress at the 48th Grand Bell Awards and the 32nd Blue Dragon Film Awards for her performance in the serial killer thriller Blind. Her television work includes Romance (2002), On Air (2008), A Gentleman's Dignity (2012), and 18 Again (2020).

She is recognized for her roles in both film and television, particularly in romantic comedies. Kim Ha-neul has received awards at both the SBS Drama Awards and the Grand Bell Awards. In addition to her acting career, she also enjoys a strong following in China.

== Early and personal life ==
Kim Ha-neul was born on February 21, 1978, in Seoul, South Korea. Her given name "Ha-neul" means "sky" in Korean. Her immediate family consists of her parents and one younger brother. She attended the Seoul Institute of the Arts.

== Career ==
=== 1996–2000: Early career ===
Kim Ha-neul started her career by modeling for clothing brand Storm in 1996. She then made her acting debut in the 1998 film Bye June alongside Yoo Ji-tae. In 1999, she starred a medical drama film Doctor K, which earned her first acting award nomination. In the same year, she made appearances in television dramas Happy Together and Into the Sunlight, and featured in the music video for "To Heaven" by Jo Sung-mo. Later, she reunited with Yoo Ji-tae in 2000's sci-fi romance Ditto, and rose to fame as an actress.

=== 2001–2007: Rise to popularity ===
Kim's breakout role was in romance melodrama series Piano, in which she played a pure, fragile young woman. The series was the second most successful drama of 2001, achieving a peak rating of 40.2%. She then starred in 2002 hit Romance alongside Kim Jae-won, which led her to stardom and won her Top Excellence Award in acting. In 2003, she raised her profile through the huge box-office hit My Tutor Friend, where she acted as a college girl tasked with helping a delinquent student her own age graduate from high school alongside her opposite Kwon Sang-woo. In 2004, she starred in Too Beautiful to Lie, as an ex-convict who pretends to be the fiancée of a man being pressured to marry by his nosy, close-knit family. Due to the success of her films, Kim was dubbed "the queen of romantic comedies" by the Korean press.

In 2004, she starred in mountain-climbing drama Ice Rain, horror film Dead Friend and the melodrama Stained Glass. Kim then returned to the familiar romance genre with 2006 romantic comedy Almost Love, in the role of an aspiring actress with stage fright, which also reunited her with My Tutor Friend co-star Kwon Sang-woo. This was followed by Lovers of Six Years, about a longtime couple facing relationship problems.

=== 2008–2012: Revived career ===
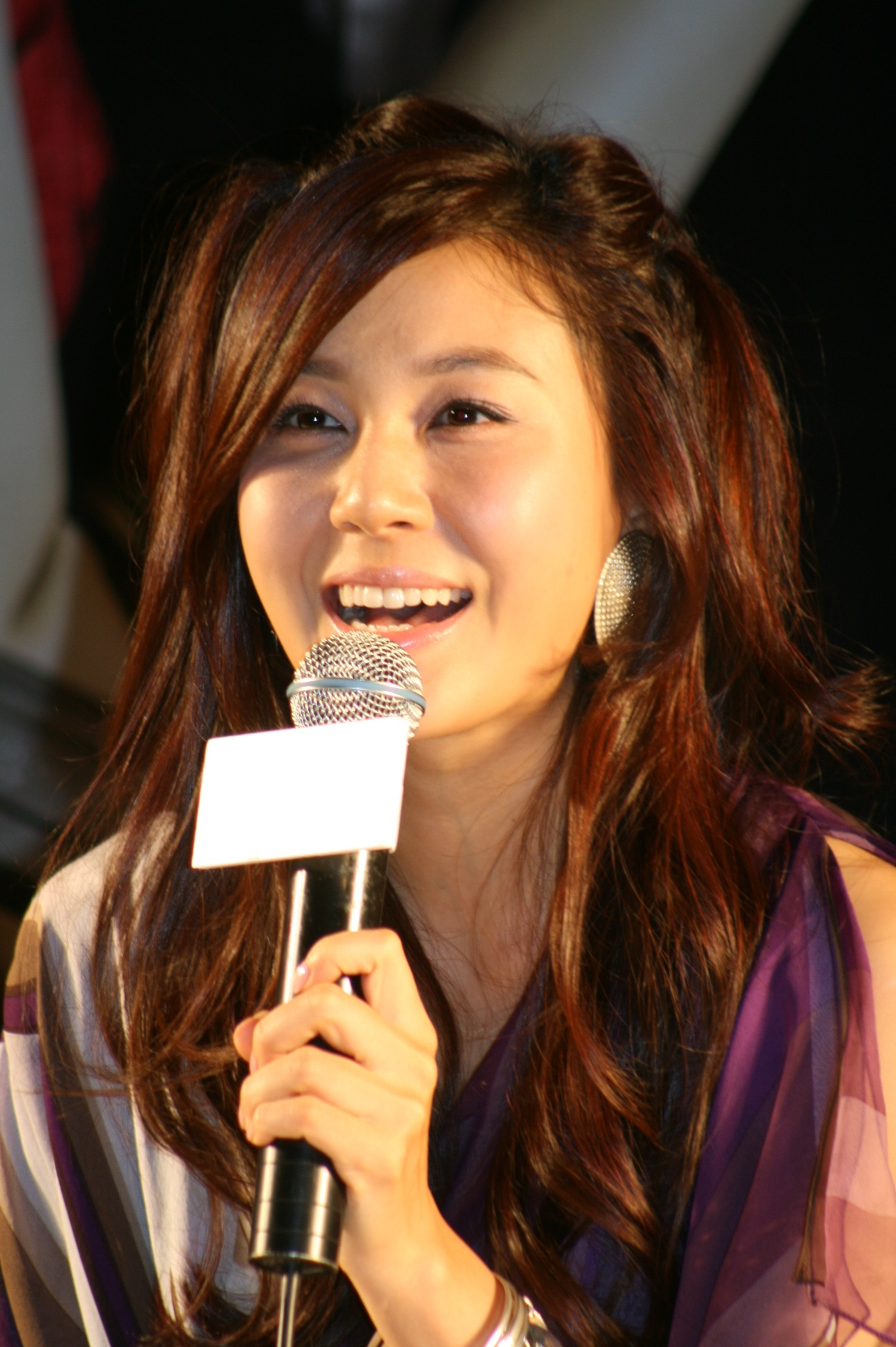
Kim during My Girlfriend Is an Agent press conference in March 2009

In 2008, Kim starred in On Air, a Kim Eun-sook penned drama which gives viewers a behind-the-scenes look at a television drama production. Kim plays a top actress with an arrogant personality in the series. The drama raised Kim's popularity and earned her acting recognition at the Korea Drama Awards. The following year, Kim starred in spy romantic comedy My Girlfriend Is an Agent. The film was a box-office success, and earned positive reviews for its quality and performance.

In 2010, Kim played a medical student torn between two soldiers in Korean War drama Road No. 1. Despite strong hype and a ₩13 million budget, the series received low ratings.

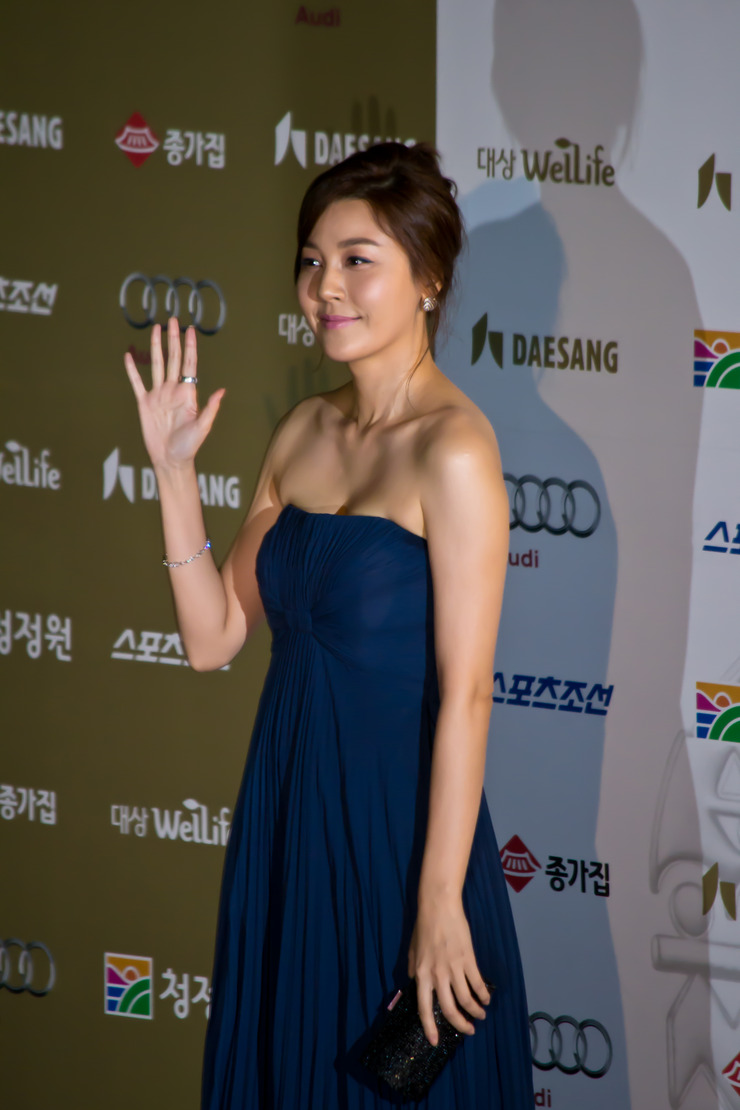
Kim in November 2011

She bounced back in 2011 with serial killer thriller Blind, where she challenged herself by portraying a visually impaired former detective who becomes witness to a murder. Her performance won her Best Actress honors at the Grand Bell Awards and Blue Dragon Film Awards. This was followed by another rom-com You're My Pet, adapted from the Japanese josei manga Kimi wa Petto.

In 2012, Kim returned to the small screen as a high school ethics teacher who falls for a playboy architect (played by Jang Dong-gun) in the hit drama A Gentleman's Dignity. Made by the same team behind On Air (writer Kim Eun-sook and director Shin Woo-chul), the series revolved around the love lives of four male friends in their forties.

=== 2015–present: Return to the screen ===
In 2015, Kim was cast in her first Chinese film, romantic comedy Making Family opposite Aarif Rahman.

In 2016, Kim starred in crowdfunded indie feature Don't Forget Me opposite Jung Woo-sung. In September, she made her small-screen comeback in four years, starring in romance melodrama On the Way to the Airport opposite Lee Sang-yoon.

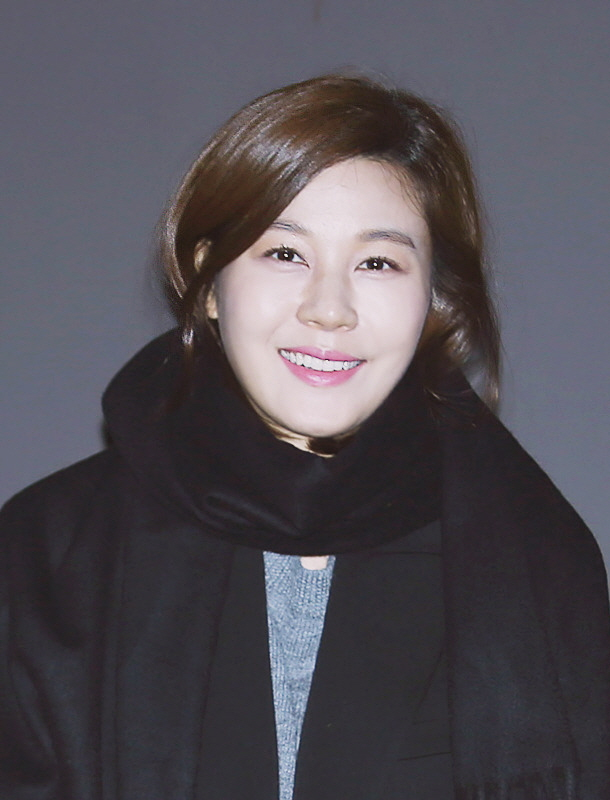
Kim in January 2017

In 2017, she starred in Misbehavior, playing an unloved teacher at a boys' high school. Kim then featured in fantasy blockbuster Along with the Gods: The Two Worlds.

In 2019, Kim returned to the small screen in JTBC melodrama The Wind Blows.

In 2020, Kim starred in the romance drama 18 Again, based on the 2009 film 17 Again.

In March 2021, Kim signed a contract with IOK Company.

== Personal life ==
=== Marriage and family ===
Kim married a businessman, on March 19, 2016. On October 9, 2017, Kim announced that she is expecting her first child. On May 27, 2018, she gave birth to a daughter.

=== Religion ===
She is a Roman Catholic and her baptismal name is Cecilia.

== Filmography ==
=== Film ===
Year	Title	Role	Notes
1998	Bye June	Yoo Chae-young	
1999	Doctor K	Oh Sae-yeon	
2000	Ditto	Yoon So-eun	
2003	My Tutor Friend	Choi Su-wan	
2004	Ice Rain	Kim Kyung-min	
2004	Too Beautiful to Lie	Joo Young-ju	
2004	Dead Friend	Min Ji-won	
2006	Almost Love	Jin Dal-rae	
2008	Lovers of Six Years	Lee Da-jin	
2009	My Girlfriend Is an Agent	Ahn Soo-ji	
2009	Paradise	Mi-kyung	
2011	Blind	Min Soo-ah	
2011	You're My Pet	Ji Eun-yi	
2016	Remember You	Jin-young	
2016	Making Family	Go Mi-yeon	Korean-Chinese co-production
2017	Misbehavior	Park Hyo-joo	
2017	Along with the Gods: The Two Worlds	God of Betrayal Hell	Cameo

=== Television ===
Year	Title	Role	Notes	Ref.
1999	Happy Together	Jin Soo-ha		
1999	Into the Sunlight	Kang Soo-bin		
2000	Secret	Lee Hee-jung		
2001	Piano	Lee Soo-ah		
2002	Romance	Kim Chae-won		
2004	Stained Glass	Shin Ji-soo		
2006	90 Days, Time to Love	Go Mi-yeon		
2008	On Air	Oh Seung-ah		
2009	Paradise	Mi-kyung	Telecinema	
2010	Road No. 1	Kim Soo-yeon		
2012	A Gentleman's Dignity	Seo Yi-soo		
2016	On the Way to the Airport	Choi Soo-ah		
2019	The Wind Blows	Lee Soo-jin		
2020	18 Again	Jung Da-jung		
2022	Kill Heel	Woo Hyun		
2024	Nothing Uncovered	Seo Jeong-won		
2024	Red Swan	Oh Wan-soo		

=== Music video appearances ===
Year	Song title	Artist	Ref.
1998	"To Heaven"	Jo Sung-mo	
2002	"Last Promise" (마지막 약속)	Position	
2009	"I Was Happy" (행복했었다)	Jo Sung-mo	

== Discography ==
=== Singles ===
List of singles, showing year released, and name of the album
Title	Year	Album
"Sky Love"	2008	On Air OST
"Stars in the Night Sky" (밤하늘의 별을) (Yang Jung-seung of Kiroy Y featuring Kim Ha-neul)	2011	Non-album single
"Bbuing Bbuing" Sung by Jang Keun-suk and Kim Ha-neul)	2011	You're My Pet OST
"I Only Look at You" (너만 보여) Sung by Jang Keun-suk and Kim Ha-neul)	2011	You're My Pet OST
"Good" (좋아)	2011	You're My Pet OST

== Awards and nominations ==
Name of the award ceremony, year presented, category, nominee of the award, and the result of the nomination
Award ceremony	Year	Category	Nominee / Work	Result	Ref.
Baeksang Arts Awards	2003	Most Popular Actress (Film)	My Tutor Friend	Won	
Baeksang Arts Awards	2004	Best Actress (Film)	Too Beautiful to Lie	Won	
Baeksang Arts Awards	2017	InStyle Fashion Award	Kim Ha-neul	Won	
Baeksang Arts Awards	2017	Best Actress (TV)	On the Way to the Airport	Nominated	
Blue Dragon Film Awards	1999	Best Supporting Actress	Doctor K	Nominated	
Blue Dragon Film Awards	2000	Best Leading Actress	Ditto	Nominated	
Blue Dragon Film Awards	2003	Best Leading Actress	My Tutor Friend	Nominated	
Blue Dragon Film Awards	2004	Best Leading Actress	Too Beautiful to Lie	Nominated	
Blue Dragon Film Awards	2008	Popular Star Award	Lovers of Six Years	Won	
Blue Dragon Film Awards	2009	Best Leading Actress	My Girlfriend Is an Agent	Nominated	
Blue Dragon Film Awards	2011	Best Leading Actress	Blind	Won	
Buil Film Awards	2011	Best Actress	Blind	Nominated	
Buil Film Awards	2017	Best Actress	Misbehavior	Nominated	
Chunsa Film Art Awards	2001	Best New Actress	Ditto	Nominated	
Chunsa Film Art Awards	2017	Best Actress	Misbehavior	Nominated	
Grand Bell Awards	2001	Best New Actress	Ditto	Nominated	
Grand Bell Awards	2004	Best Actress	Too Beautiful to Lie	Nominated	
Grand Bell Awards	2011	Best Actress	Blind	Won	
K-Drama Star Awards	2012	Top Excellence Award, Actress	A Gentleman's Dignity	Nominated	
KBS Drama Awards	2016	Best Couple Award	Kim Ha-neul with Lee Sang-yoon; On the Way to the Airport	Won	
KBS Drama Awards	2016	Top Excellence Award, Actress	On the Way to the Airport	Won	
KBS Drama Awards	2016	Excellence Award, Actress in a Miniseries	On the Way to the Airport	Nominated	
KBS Drama Awards	2024	Grand Prize (Daesang)	Nothing Uncovered	Nominated	
KBS Drama Awards	2024	Top Excellence Award, Actress	Nothing Uncovered	Nominated	
KBS Drama Awards	2024	Excellence Award, Actress in a Miniseries	Nothing Uncovered	Nominated	
KBS Drama Awards	2024	Popularity Award, Actress	Nothing Uncovered	Nominated	
Korea Drama Awards	2008	Top Excellence Award, Actress	On Air	Won	
Korea Drama Awards	2019	Top Excellence Award, Actress	The Wind Blows	Nominated	
Korea Fashion & Design Awards	2008	Best Dressed	Kim Ha-neul	Won	
Max Movie Awards	2009	Best Actress	My Girlfriend Is an Agent	Nominated	
MBC Drama Awards	2002	Top Excellence Award, Actress in a Miniseries	Romance	Won	
SBS Drama Awards	2001	Popularity Award	Piano	Won	
SBS Drama Awards	2008	Top Excellence Award, Actress	On Air	Won	
SBS Drama Awards	2008	Top 10 Stars	On Air	Won	
SBS Drama Awards	2012	Top Excellence Award, Actress in a Weekend/Serial Drama	A Gentleman's Dignity	Won	
SBS Drama Awards	2012	Top 10 Stars	A Gentleman's Dignity	Won	
SBS Drama Awards	2012	Popularity Award	A Gentleman's Dignity	Won	
