= List of South Korean films of 2013 =

This is a list of South Korean films that received a domestic theatrical release in 2013.

== Box office ==
The highest-grossing South Korean films released in 2013, by domestic box office gross revenue, are as follows:

Highest-grossing films released in 2013
Rank	Title	Distributor	Domestic gross
1	Miracle in Cell No. 7	Next Entertainment World	$74,307,039
2	The Attorney	Next Entertainment World	$67,350,466
3	Snowpiercer	CJ Entertainment	$54,472,112
4	The Face Reader	Showbox	$53,644,719
5	The Berlin File	CJ Entertainment	$42,550,486
6	Secretly, Greatly	Showbox	$39,578,129
7	The Terror Live	Lotte Cultureworks	$32,402,238
8	Hide and Seek	Next Entertainment World	$32,184,474
9	Cold Eyes	Next Entertainment World	$32,011,160
10	New World	Next Entertainment World	$28,356,744

== Released ==
Released	English title	Korean title	Director	Cast	Admissions	Ref.
3 January	A Boy's Sister	누나	Lee Won-sik	Sung Yu-ri, Lee Joo-seung	1,365	
3 January	Moksha: The World or I, How Does That Work?	모크샤	Koo Seong-joo	Jang Hyuk-jin, Park Gil-soo		
3 January	Ohayo Sapporo	오하이오 삿포로	Kim Seong-joon	Soy, Tae In-ho		
9 January	Man on the Edge	박수건달	Jo Jin-kyu	Park Shin-yang, Kim Jung-tae, Uhm Ji-won	3,893,216	
9 January	A Wonderful Moment	마이 리틀 히어로	Kim Seong-hoon	Kim Rae-won, Ji Dae-han	183,650	
17 January	B-E-D	베드	Park Chul-soo	Jang Hyuk-jin, Lee Min-ah	274	
17 January	Horny Family	배꼽	Park Bo-sang	Lee Mi-sook, Kim Seung-woo		
23 January	Miracle in Cell No. 7	7번방의 선물	Lee Hwan-kyung	Ryu Seung-ryong, Kal So-won, Park Shin-hye	12,811,206	
23 January	Pororo, The Racing Adventure	뽀로로 슈퍼썰매 대모험	Park Young-gyun	Lee Seon, Lee Mi-ja	931,344	
24 January	Sea of Butterflies	나비와 바다	Park Bae-il		1,088	
30 January	The Berlin File	베를린	Ryoo Seung-wan	Ha Jung-woo, Han Suk-kyu, Ryoo Seung-bum, Jun Ji-hyun	7,166,290	
31 January	The Etudes of Love	그여자 그남자의 속사정	Lee Yoon-hyung	Jung Da-hye, Yeon Je-wook, Seo Ji-seok	494	
31 January	A Fish	물고기	Park Hong-min	Lee Jang-hoon, Kim Seon-bin	447	
31 January	The Three Musketeers	삼총사: 용감한 친구들	Lee Jong-gwan	Nam Do-hyeong, Im Kyeong-myeong		
4 February	No Cave	반달곰	Lee Jeong-hong	Choi Kyeong-joon, Kang Yeon-jeong	123	
6 February	South Bound	남쪽으로 튀어	Yim Soon-rye	Kim Yoon-seok, Oh Yeon-soo	832,894	
14 February	Fool	바보야	Kang Seong-ok	Stephen Kim Sou-hwan	17,243	
14 February	From Seoul to Varanasi	불륜의 시대	Jeon Kyu-hwan	Yoon Dong-hwan, Choi Won-jung	1,496	
14 February	Goodbye Homerun	굿바이 홈런	Lee Jung-ho		1,952	
14 February	How to Use Guys with Secret Tips	남자사용설명서	Lee Won-suk	Lee Si-young, Oh Jung-se	507,913	
21 February	An Ethics Lesson	분노의 윤리학	Park Myung-rang	Lee Je-hoon, Cho Jin-woong	225,618	
21 February	New World	신세계	Park Hoon-jung	Lee Jung-jae, Hwang Jung-min, Choi Min-sik	4,682,492	
21 February	Sunshine Boys	1999, 면회	Kim Tae-gon	Kim Chang-hwan, Shim Hee-seop	3,009	
28 February	Behind the Camera	뒷담화: 감독이 미쳤어요	E J-yong	Youn Yuh-jung, Park Hee-soon	5,178	
28 February	Nobody's Daughter Haewon	누구의 딸도 아닌 해원	Hong Sang-soo	Jung Eun-chae, Lee Sun-kyun	35,396	
7 March	The Gifted Hands	사이코메트리	Kwon Ho-young	Kim Kang-woo, Kim Bum	534,273	
7 March	Jury	주리	Kim Dong-ho	Ahn Sung-ki, Kang Soo-yeon	968	
7 March	Kisses	키스	Kang Ho-joon, Kim Jin-hee, Hwang Hee-seong, Seo Yong-ho, Lee Jung-won, Moon In-dae, Lee Hyun-chul, Kim Doo-heon	Kim Min-gyu, Yoo Ji-hye	545	
14 March	Beautiful Miss Jin	미스진은 예쁘다	Jang Hee-cheol	Jeon Seon-mi, Ha Hyeon-gwan	1,453	
14 March	My Paparotti	파파로티	Yoon Jong-chan	Lee Je-hoon, Han Suk-kyu	1,716,429	
14 March	When Winter Screams	설인	Lee Samuel	Kim Tae-hoon, Ji Woo	581	
14 March	Your Time Is Up	누구나 제 명에 죽고 싶다	Kim Sung-hyun	Choi Won-young	334	
21 March	Calling 4	소명 하늘의 별	Shin Hyeon-won		10,163	
21 March	Eating, Talking, Faucking	생생활활	Park Chul-soo	Oh In-hye, Lee Deok-hwa	126	
21 March	Jiseul	지슬	O Muel	Lee Kyeong-joon, Hong Sang-pyo	144,146	
21 March	A Journey with Korean Masters	마스터 클래스의 산책	Lee Jang-ho, Lee Doo-yong, Park Chul-soo, Byun Jang-ho, Chung Ji-young	Yang Taek-jo, Lee Geung-young		
21 March	Very Ordinary Couple	연애의 온도	Roh Deok	Kim Min-hee, Lee Min-ki	1,865,195	
28 March	Following Sand River	모래가 흐르는 강	Jiyul Sunim		10,742	
28 March	Good Friends	좋은 친구들	Jin Hyung-tae	Yeon Jung-hoon, Lee Ji-hoon, Kazuki Kitamura	1,083	
3 April	Jeju Prayer	비념	Im Heung-soon	Kang Sang-hee, Han Shin-hwa	1,712	
4 April	Running Man	런닝맨	Jo Dong-oh	Shin Ha-kyun	1,422,844	
4 April	In My End Is My Beginning	끝과 시작	Min Kyu-dong	Uhm Jung-hwa, Kim Hyo-jin, Hwang Jung-min	37,585	
8 April	Self-Referential Traverse	철의 여인	Kim Gok, Kim Sun	Jung Ah-young, Pyo Sang-woo		
10 April	Fists of Legend	전설의 주먹	Kang Woo-suk	Hwang Jung-min, Yoo Jun-sang, Yoon Je-moon	1,744,585	
17 April	The Final Addiction	마지막 중독	Lee Se-il	Kim Ji-won, Lee Min-woo		
18 April	Azooma	공정사회	Lee Ji-seung	Jang Young-nam	14,448	
18 April	Fetus 3D	태아 3D	Pyo Man-seok		593	
18 April	The Girl Princes	왕자가 된 소녀들	Kim Hye-jung	Jo Keung-aeng, Kim Jin-jin, Park Mi-sook	1,404	
18 April	Norigae	노리개	Choi Seung-ho	Ma Dong-seok, Lee Seung-yeon, Min Ji-hyun	168,872	
24 April	Dream Affection 2	몽정애 2 - 기막힌 상상	Lee Se-il	Yoon Je-hoon, Kang Yoo-ki		
30 April	One Perfect Day	사랑의 가위바위보	Kim Jee-woon	Yoon Kye-sang, Park Shin-hye		
1 May	Born to Sing	전국노래자랑	Lee Jong-pil	Kim In-kwon, Ryu Hyun-kyung	978,413	
9 May	Boomerang Family	고령화 가족	Song Hae-sung	Park Hae-il, Gong Hyo-jin	1,141,222	
9 May	Hard to Say	말로는 힘들어	Lee Kwang-kuk	Kim Sae-byuk, Lee Dal		
16 May	Dear Dolphin	환상속의 그대	Kang Jin-a	Lee Hee-joon, Lee Young-jin, Han Ye-ri	6,466	
16 May	Happiness for Sale	미나문방구	Jeong Ik-hwan	Choi Kang-hee, Bong Tae-gyu	334,323	
16 May	Montage	몽타주	Jeong Keun-seob	Uhm Jung-hwa, Kim Sang-kyung	2,095,592	
16 May	Where Are to Go?	어디로 갈까요?	Jin Seung-hyun	Yoo Gun, Kim Gyu-ri	36	
23 May	Century of Stimulus	자극의 세기	Jung Gil-young, Park Sung-hyun, Song Dong-il	Go Myung-hwan, Kwon Tae-won		
23 May	Forest Dancing	춤추는 숲	Kang Seok-pil	Lee Chang-hwan, Yoo Chang-bok	8,056	
23 May	On the Road: Bhikkuni Buddhist Nuns	길위에서	Lee Chang-jae		53,273	
24 May	Misaeng	미생	Kim Tae-hee, Son Tae-gyum	Yim Si-wan, Changmin, Baro		
30 May	El Condor Pasa	콘돌은 날아간다	Jeon Soo-il	Cho Jae-hyun, Bae Jeong-hwa	371	
30 May	Farewell	작별들	Kim Baek-joon	Joo Da-young, Lee Joo-seung		
30 May	Rockin' on Heaven's Door	뜨거운 안녕	Nam Taek-soo	Lee Hongki, Ma Dong-seok	46,310	
30 May	Sleepless Night	잠 못 드는 밤	Jang Kun-jae	Kim Su-hyeon, Kim Ju-ryeong	1,957	
5 June	Horror Stories 2	무서운 이야기 2	Min Kyu-dong, Kim Sung-ho, Kim Hwi, Jung Bum-sik	Lee Se-young, Park Sung-woong, Sung Joon, Lee Soo-hyuk, Baek Jin-hee, Kim Seul-gi, Go Kyung-pyo, Kim Ji-won	495,522	
5 June	Secretly, Greatly	은밀하게 위대하게	Jang Cheol-soo	Kim Soo-hyun, Park Ki-woong, Lee Hyun-woo	6,959,083	
6 June	Mai Ratima	마이 라띠마	Yoo Ji-tae	Park Ji-soo, Bae Soo-bin	6,712	
6 June	Miss Cherry's Love Puzzle	앵두야, 연애하자	Jung Ha-rin	Ryu Hyun-kyung, Ha Si-eun	2,213	
9 June	The Shadow	그림자	Kim Hyeon-ho	Lee Woo-seok, Park Ji-young		
13 June	You Are More Than Beautiful	그녀의 연기	Kim Tae-yong	Park Hee-soon, Gong Hyo-jin	3,209	
20 June	Doctor	닥터	Kim Seong-hong	Kim Chang-wan, Bae Soo-eun	67,812	
20 June	Holly	홀리	Park Byeong-hwan	Bang Minah, Shin-ee, Jung Ae-yeon	1,499	
20 June	The Puppet	꼭두각시	Kwon Young-rak	Lee Jong-soo, Gu Ji-seong	31,338	
27 June	Cheer Up, Mr. Lee	힘내세요, 병헌씨	Lee Byung-heon	Hong Wan-pyo, Yang Hyun-min	2,965	
27 June	Killer Toon	더 웹툰: 예고살인	Kim Yong-gyun	Lee Si-young, Um Ki-joon	1,201,033	
3 July	Cold Eyes	감시자들	Cho Ui-seok, Kim Byeong-seo	Sul Kyung-gu, Jung Woo-sung, Han Hyo-joo	5,508,017	
4 July	48m	48미터	Min Baek-doo	Park Hyo-joo, Lee Jin-hee	12,971	
11 July	Big Good	경복	Choi Si-hyung	Choi Si-hyung, Han Ye-ri		
11 July	Kong's Family	콩가네	Nam Ki-woong	Kim Byung-ok, Yoon Da-kyeong	263	
11 July	Pluto	명왕성	Shin Su-won	Lee David, Sung Joon, Kim Kkot-bi	16,420	
11 July	Super Fish - An Endless Adventure	슈퍼피쉬 - 끝없는 여정	Lee Ji-woon, Lee Ki-yeon, Song Woong-dal		2,040	
17 July	Mr. Go	미스터 고	Kim Yong-hwa	Xu Jiao, Sung Dong-il	1,328,890	
18 July	We Were There	우리는 그곳에 있었다	June Park		1,202	
25 July	District 820	군사통제구역 820지대	Gu Mo	Greena Park, Lee Seung-jin	136	
25 July	The Ring of Life	링	Lee Jin-hyeok	Park Hyun-sung, Park Joo-young	1,371	
31 July	The Terror Live	더 테러 라이브	Kim Byung-woo	Ha Jung-woo, Lee Geung-young	5,584,146	
31 July	Young Mother	젊은 엄마	Kong Ja-kwan	Lee Eun-mi, Joo In-cheol		
1 August	Snowpiercer	설국열차	Bong Joon-ho	Chris Evans, Song Kang-ho	9,349,991	
1 August	Yellow Hair - Plastic Sex	노랑머리 - 플라스틱 섹스	Lee Se-il	Min Shin-ae, Seong Yoon-ah	600	
8 August	Old Men Never Die	죽지않아	Hwang Cheol-min	Lee Bong-gyu, Han Eun-bi	911	
8 August	Super Show 4 3D	슈퍼쇼4 3D	Yoo Ho-jin	Super Junior	2,630	
14 August	The Bluff	허풍	Kong Ja-kwan	Lee Jeong-gil, Kim Dong-soo	471	
14 August	The Flu	감기	Kim Sung-su	Soo Ae, Jang Hyuk	3,119,023	
14 August	Hide and Seek	숨바꼭질	Huh Jung	Son Hyun-joo, Moon Jeong-hee	5,604,104	
14 August	Let's Go to Rose Motel	가자! 장미여관으로	Shin Jung-gyun	Sung Eun-chae, Yeo Min-jung	8,127	
15 August	The Big Picture	그리고 싶은 것	Kwon Hyo	Kim Yoon-duk, Shim Dal-yeon	4,765	
15 August	Let Me Out	렛 미 아웃	Jae Soh, Kim Chang-rae	Kwon Hyun-sang, Park Hee-von	667	
22 August	Anti Gas Skin	방독피	Kim Gok, Kim Sun	Jo Young-jin, Jang Liu	448	
22 August	Fatal	가시꽃	Lee Don-ku	Nam Yeon-woo, Yang Jo-ah	1,684	
22 August	There Is No Beautiful Farewell	아름다운 이별은 없다	Lee Sang-hwa	Go Soo-hyeon, Hwang Jeong-ah	200	
29 August	Game of Desire	욕망의 유희	Lee Se-il	Kang Se-mi, Kim Won-seok		
29 August	Our Ex-Girlfriends	우리들의 헤어진 여자친구	Lee Kwang-ho	Joo Young-ho, Oh Yeon-jae	235	
29 August	Playboy Bong	아티스트 봉만대	Bong Man-dae	Bong Man-dae, Kwak Hyeon-hwa	13,466	
29 August	Private Island	일탈여행: 프라이빗 아일랜드	Han Sang-hee	Son Eun-seo, Shin So-yul	2,999	
5 September	33Li	33리	Cho Seung-yeon	Top Bob, Kim Min-kyeong		
5 September	Miss Change	미스체인지	Jung Cho-shin	Lee Soo-jung, Song Sam-dong	4,981	
5 September	Moebius	뫼비우스	Kim Ki-duk	Cho Jae-hyun, Seo Young-joo	34,708	
5 September	Over and Over Again	개똥이	Kim Byung-joon	Song Sam-dong, Lee Eun-kyeong	640	
5 September	Project Cheonan Ship	천안함 프로젝트	Baek Seung-woo	Kang Shin-il	20,261	
5 September	The Spy: Undercover Operation	스파이	Lee Seung-jun	Sul Kyung-gu, Moon So-ri, Daniel Henney	3,435,801	
11 September	The Face Reader	관상	Han Jae-rim	Song Kang-ho, Lee Jung-jae	9,134,586	
12 September	Love in 42.9	낭만파 남편의 편지	Choi Wi-an	Kim Jae-man, Shin So-hyun	955	
12 September	Our Sunhi	우리선희	Hong Sang-soo	Jung Yu-mi, Lee Sun-kyun, Kim Sang-joong, Jung Jae-young	68,697	
19 September	The Russian Novel	러시안 소설	Shin Yeon-shick	Kang Shin-hyo, Kyung Sung-hwan	5,338	
26 September	Are You Ready?	아유레디	Heo Won		10,607	
26 September	Jit (Act)	짓	Han Jong-hoon	Seo Tae-hwa, Seo Eun-ah, Kim Hee-jung	22,889	
26 September	A Mere Life	별거숭이	Park Sang-hoon	Kim Min-hyeok, Jang Liu		
2 October	Tough as Iron	깡철이	Ahn Gwon-tae	Yoo Ah-in, Kim Hae-sook	1,209,363	
2 October	Hope	소원	Lee Joon-ik	Sul Kyung-gu, Uhm Ji-won	2,711,071	
3 October	Love Scene	러브씬	Lee Jung-won, Kim Doo-heon, Moon In-dae	Choi Hyeon-ho, Kim Jun-won	539	
8 October	The Hero	히어로	Kim Bong-han	Oh Jung-se, Park Chul-min	23,387	
9 October	Hwayi: A Monster Boy	화이: 괴물을 삼킨 아이	Jang Joon-hwan	Yeo Jin-goo, Kim Yoon-seok	2,394,453	
17 October	Fasten Your Seatbelt	롤러코스터	Ha Jung-woo	Jung Kyung-ho	270,148	
17 October	Koala	코알라	Kim Ju-hwan	Park Young-seo, Song Yoo-ha	4,864	
17 October	Neverdie Butterfly	네버다이 버터플라이	Jang Hyun-sang	Shin Jae-seung, Kim Tae-yoon	787	
17 October	Queen of the Night	밤의 여왕	Kim Je-yeong	Kim Min-jung, Chun Jung-myung	252,475	
17 October	Silk Flower	비단꽃길	Kim Jeong-wook	Kim Geum-hwa	162	
17 October	Vacation	바캉스	Park Seon-wook	Yoo Sa-ra, Wi Ji-woong	5,051	
24 October	Blood and Ties	공범	Guk Dong-seok	Son Ye-jin, Kim Kap-soo	1,766,285	
24 October	Breed - Her Inside Me	사육 - 내안에 가둔 그녀	Lee Se-il	Yoo Se-mi	380	
24 October	If You Were Me 6	어떤 시선	Lee Sang-cheol, Min Yong-keun, Park Jung-bum, Shin A-ga	Lee Young-seok, Hwang Jae-won	27,714	
24 October	Rough Play	배우는 배우다	Shin Yeon-shick	Lee Joon	111,938	
24 October	Talking Architecture, City:Hall	말하는 건축 시티:홀	Jeong Jae-eun	Yu Geol	2,813	
24 October	Top Star	톱스타	Park Joong-hoon	Uhm Tae-woong, So Yi-hyun, Kim Min-jun	175,152	
30 October	Days of Wrath	응징자	Shin Dong-yeob	Joo Sang-wook, Yang Dong-geun	192,347	
30 October	No Breathing	노브레싱	Jo Yong-sun	Seo In-guk, Lee Jong-suk	451,669	
31 October	Delicious Love Formula - Sex	맛있는 사랑공식 - 섹스	Lee Se-il	Yoon Jae-hoon, Yoon Ha-seon	5,460	
31 October	Green Chair 2013 - Love Conceptually	녹색의자 2013 - 러브 컨셉츄얼리	Park Chul-soo	Ha Jin Hye-kyeong, Kim Do-sung		
31 October	Mango Tree	망고트리	Lee Soo-seong	Seo Ji-seok, Hong Soo-ah	7,073	
31 October	Nora Noh	노라노	Kim Seong-hee	Nora Noh	1,543	
31 October	One of a Kind 3D: G-Dragon 2013 1st World Tour	원 오브 어 카인드 3D	Jeong Chi-yeong, Son Seok	G-Dragon	6,327	
6 November	Commitment	동창생	Park Hong-soo	T.O.P, Han Ye-ri	1,048,280	
6 November	Red Family	붉은 가족	Lee Joo-hyeong	Kim Yoo-mi, Jung Woo		
7 November	My Dear Girl, Jin-young	사랑해! 진영아	Lee Sung-eun	Kim Gyu-ri, Park Won-sang	3,873	
7 November	Door to the Night	야관문: 욕망의 꽃	Im Kyeong-soo	Shin Seong-il, Bae Seul-ki	4,394	
7 November	Steel Cold Winter	소녀	Choi Jin-sung	Kim Shi-hoo, Kim Yoon-hye	19,590	
7 November	The Weight	무게	Jeon Kyu-hwan	Cho Jae-hyun, Park Ji-a		
14 November	Black Gospel	블랙가스펠	hisMT Ministry	Yang Dong-geun, Jung Jun, Kim Yoo-mi	53,181	
14 November	Dead End	데드엔드	Yoon Yeo-chang	Kim Min-jun		
14 November	The Five	더 파이브	Jeong Yeon-shik	Kim Sun-a, On Joo-wan	731,212	
14 November	Friend: The Great Legacy	친구 2	Kwak Kyung-taek	Yu Oh-seong, Kim Woo-bin	2,969,900	
14 November	Ingtoogi: The Battle of Internet Trolls	잉투기	Um Tae-hwa	Uhm Tae-gu, Ryu Hye-young	15,128	
14 November	Kid Cast Away 2013	표류일기	Won Seong-jin	Nalie Lee, Jeon Moo-song		
21 November	House with a Good View - Voyeuristic Desire	전망 좋은 하우스 - 관음적 욕망	Jin Dal-rae	Shin Young-woong, Kim Ji-won	3,650	
21 November	The Fake	사이비	Yeon Sang-ho	Yang Ik-june, Oh Jung-se	20,780	
21 November	Marriage Blue	결혼전야	Hong Ji-young	Kim Hyo-jin, Kim Kang-woo, Lee Yeon-hee, Ju Ji-hoon, Taecyeon, Ma Dong-seok, Guzal Tursunova, Lee Hee-joon, Go Joon-hee	1,212,843	
21 November	Precious Love	완전 소중한 사랑	Kim Jin-min	Shim Yi-young, Im Ji-kyu	15,852	
21 November	Short! Short! Short! 2013	소설, 영화와 만나다	Lee Sang-woo, Lee Jin-woo, Park Jin-seong, Park Jin-seok	(Exit) Han Joo-wan, Cho Yoon-hee (Waltzing on Thunder) Kim Seo-hyung (The Body) Bae Seul-ki, Shin Dong-mi		
21 November	Believe Me	청춘정담	Moon In-soo	Go Kyung-pyo, Han Jeon-jin		
28 November	11 A.M.	열한시	Kim Hyun-seok	Jung Jae-young, Kim Ok-bin	870,785	
28 November	Beautiful Child	뷰티풀 차일드	Lee Seong-soo			
28 November	Cat Girl	고양이 소녀	Choi Kyeong-jin	Lee Soo-wan, Hirosawa Sou		
28 November	Hello?! Orchestra	안녕?! 오케스트라	Lee Cheol-ha	Richard Yongjae O'Neill	13,928	
28 November	Lazy Hitchhikers' Tour de Europe	잉여들의 히치하이킹	Lee Ho-jae	Lee Ho-jae, Lee Hyeon-hak	26,281	
28 November	Red Vacance Black Wedding 2	붉은 바캉스 검은 웨딩 2	Choi Wi-an	Moon Ji-young, Kim Jae-rok	3,840	
28 November	Tumbleweed	창수	Lee Deok-hee	Im Chang-jung, Ahn Nae-sang	429,141	
5 December	Fancy Walk	화려한 외출	Ko Kyeong-ah	Kim Seon-young, Byun Joon-seok	3,697	
5 December	Veil	베일	Jeong Chang-hyeon	Yoo Sang-jae, Kim Seung-yeon		
6 December	Queer Movie 20	퀴어영화 20	Baek In-gyu	Jeong Hyo-rak, Yoon Tae-woo		
11 December	The Secret Studio	비밀의 화방	Jin Dal-rae	Joo Hye-ri, Song Jeong-eun	4,630	
11 December	Way Back Home	집으로 가는 길	Bang Eun-jin	Jeon Do-yeon, Go Soo	1,854,702	
12 December	Campus S Couple	캠퍼스 S 커플	Song Chang-yong	Choi Phillip, Moon Bo-ryeong		
12 December	Cats and Dogs	그 강아지 그	Min Byeong-woo	Son Min-ji, Shin Myung-geun	3,400	
12 December	Scenery	풍경	Zhang Lu		1,256	
18 December	The Attorney	변호인	Yang Woo-suk	Song Kang-ho, Kim Young-ae	11,373,432	
18 December	Steal My Heart/Catch Me	캐치미	Lee Hyeon-jong	Kim Ah-joong, Joo Won	480,434	
19 December	Beauty Wars	미녀전쟁	Im Jin-seung	Hwang Seong-hwa, Lee Eun-mi		
19 December	Shiva, Throw Your Life	시바, 인생을 던져	Lee Seong-gyu	Park Gi-deok, Kim Soo-hyun	4,029	
24 December	The Suspect	용의자	Won Shin-yun	Gong Yoo	4,131,878	
26 December	A Clear Night	청야	Kim Jae-soo	Han Yeo-woon, Kim Ki-bang	3,752	
26 December	Do You Hear She Sings?	그녀가 부른다	Park Eun-hyeong	Yoon Jin-seo, Min Seok	2,447	

== See also ==
- 2013 in South Korea
- 2013 in South Korean music
