= List of South Korean film directors =

The following is a list of South Korean film directors:

== A ==
- Ahn Byeong-ki
- Ahn Gooc-jin
- Ahn Hae-ryong
- Ahn Pan-seok

== B ==
- Bae Chang-ho
- Bae Yong-Kyun
- Baik / Baek Jong-yul
- Bang Eun-jin
- Beak Woon-hak / Baek Woon-hak
- Bong Joon-ho
- Bong Man-dae
- Byun Hyuk
- Byun Jang-ho
- Byun Sung-hyun
- Byun Young-joo

== C ==
- Chang / Yoon Hong-seung
- Chang Yoon-hyun
- Cho Chang-ho
- David Cho
- Cho Geun-hyun
- Cho Jung-rae
- Cho Ui-seok
- Choi Dong-hoon
- Choi Ha-won
- Choi Ho
- Choi Jin-sung
- Choi Kook-hee
- Choo Chang-min
- Chung Ji-young
- Peter Chung

== E ==
- E J-yong / Lee Jae-yong

== H ==
- Ha Gil-jong
- Hah Myung-joong
- Han Jae-rim
- Han Jun-hee
- Hong Sang-soo
- Huh Jung
- Hur Jin-ho
- Hwang Dong-hyuk
- Hwang In-ho

== I ==
- Im Kwon-taek
- Im Sang-soo

== J ==
- Jang Cheol-soo
- Jang Hang-jun
- Jang Hoon
- Jang Hyun-soo
- Jang Jae-hyun
- Jang Jin
- Jang Joon-hwan
- Jang Kun-jae
- Jang Sun-woo
- Jeon Kyu-hwan
- Jeon Soo-il
- Jeong Chang-hwa
- Jeong Gi-hun
- Jeong Jae-eun
- Jeong Yeon-shik
- Jeong Yoon-cheol
- Jin Mo-young
- Jo Jin-kyu
- Joh Keun-shik
- Juhn Jai-hong
- Jung Ji-woo
- Jung Jin-woo
- July Jung
- Jung Sung-il
- Jung Yoon-suk
- Jung Young-bae

== K ==
- Ku Hye Sun
- Kang Dae-ha
- Kang Hyeong-cheol
- Kang Je-gyu
- Kang Jin-a
- Kang Woo-suk
- Young Man Kang
- Kim Byung-woo
- Kim Cheong-gi
- Kim Dae-seung
- Kim Dae-woo
- Kim Dong-won (born 1955)
- Kim Dong-won (born 1962)
- Gina Kim
- Kim Hak-soon
- Kim Han-min
- Kim Ho-sun
- Kim Hyun-seok
- Jason Kim (Kim Ju-hwan)
- Kim Jee-woon
- Kim Jho Kwang-soo
- Kim Jin-kyu
- Kim Jong-kwan
- Kim Jung-kwon
- Kim Ki-duk (born 1934)
- Kim Ki-duk (born 1960)
- Kim Ki-young
- Kim Kih-hoon
- Kim Kwang-sik
- Kim Moon-saeng
- Kim Myeong-joon
- Kim Sang-jin
- Kim Sang-man
- Kim Seong-hun
- Kim Soo-yong
- Kim Sung-hoon
- Kim Sung-su
- Kim Tae-kyun
- Kim Tae-yong (born 1969)
- Kim Tae-yong (born 1987)
- Kim Ui-seok
- Kim Yong-hwa
- Kim Yoo-jin
- Kim Young-tak
- Kong Su-chang
- Koo Kyo-hwan
- Kwak Jae-yong
- Kwak Ji-kyoon
- Kwak Kyung-taek
- Kwon Hyung-jin

== L ==
- Lee Chang-dong
- Lee Cheol-ha
- Lee Don-ku
- Lee Dong-eun
- Lee Doo-yong
- Lee Eun
- Lee Gae-byok
- Lee Hae-young
- Lee Han
- Lee Ho-jae
- Lee Hwan-kyung
- Lee Hyun-seung
- Lee Hyung-min
- Lee Jae-kyoo
- Lee Jang-ho
- Lee Jeong-beom
- Lee Jeong-hyang
- John H. Lee / Lee Jae-han
- Lee Joon-ik
- Lee Ju-hyoung
- Lee Jung-gook
- Lee Kwang-hoon
- Lee Kwang-kuk
- Lee Kwang-mo
- Lee Kwon
- Lee Kyoung-mi
- Lee Il-hyung
- Lee Man-hee
- Lee Myung-se
- Lee Sang-woo
- Lee Seok-hoon
- Lee Su-jin
- Lee Sung-gang
- Lee Won-suk
- Lee Yong-ju
- Lee Yong-min
- Lee Yoon-ki
- Leesong Hee-il
- Lim Dae-hyung

== M ==
- Min Kyu-dong
- Min Joon-ki
- Mun Che-yong

== N ==
- Na Hong-jin
- Na Hyun
- Na Woon-gyu
- Nam Gi-nam
- No Zin-soo

== O ==
- O Muel

== P ==
- Park Chan-ok
- Park Chan-wook
- Park Chul-soo
- Park Hee-gon
- Park Hee-jun
- Park Heung-sik (born 1962)
- Park Heung-sik (born 1965)
- Park Hoon-jung
- Park Jong-won
- Park Jung-bum
- Park Jung-woo
- Park Kwang-chun
- Park Kwang-hyun
- Park Kwang-su
- Park Suk-young

== R ==
- Roh Deok
- Roh Gyeong-tae
- Ryoo Seung-wan
- Ryu Jang-ha

== S ==
- Seok Rae-myeong
- Shim Hyung-rae
- Shim Sung-bo
- Shin Jai-ho
- Shin Sang-ok
- Shin Seong-il
- Shin Su-won
- Shin Yeon-shick
- Song Hae-sung
- Song Hyun-wook
- Song Il-gon

== U ==
- Um Tae-hwa

== W ==
- Won Shin-yun
- Won Tae-hee
- Woo Min-ho
- Woo Moon-gi

== Y ==
- Yang Ik-june
- Yang Woo-suk
- Yang Yun-ho
- Yim Pil-sung
- Yim Soon-rye
- Yoo Ha
- Yoo Ji-tae
- Yoon Ga-eun
- Yoon Je-kyoon
- Yoon Jong-bin
- Yoon Jong-chan
- Yoon Sam-yook
- Yoon Seok-ho
- Yoon Sung-hyun
- Yu Hyun-mok

== See also ==
- Cinema of Korea
- List of highest-grossing films in South Korea
