= Game of Desire =

Game of Desire may refer to

- "Mata Hari" (Samira Efendi song)
- The Game of Desire (film), a 2019 Chinese film in which Song Jia has a cameo appearance
- Game of Desire (film), a 2013 South Korean film
