= 1st Wildflower Film Awards =

2014 edition of award ceremony

- Date: April 1, 2014
- Site: Literature House, Seoul

The 1st Wildflower Film Awards (Korean: 들꽃영화상) is an awards ceremony recognizing the achievements of Korean independent and low-budget films. It was held at the Literature House in Seoul on April 1, 2014, following five days of screenings at CGV Apgujeong Movie Collage in Seoul. Eligible films included some 60 features with budgets under ₩1 billion (US$900,000) and 20 documentaries that received a theatrical release in Korea in the calendar year 2013.

== Nominations and winners ==
(Winners denoted in bold)

Best Film
**Jiseul**; Fatal; Ingtoogi: The Battle of Internet Trolls; Pluto; Sleepless Night; The Fake; The Russian Novel
Best Director	Best New Director
**Yeon Sang-ho** - **The Fake**; Jang Kun-jae - Sleepless Night; O Muel - Jiseul; Lee Don-ku - Fatal; Shin Su-won - Pluto; Shin Yeon-shick - The Russian Novel; Um Tae-hwa - Ingtoogi: The Battle of Internet Trolls	**Lee Don-ku** - **Fatal**; Im Heung-soon - Jeju Prayer; Kim Ju-hwan - Koala; Lee Byung-heon - Cheer Up, Mr. Lee; Um Tae-hwa - Ingtoogi: The Battle of Internet Trolls
Best Documentary	Documentary Jury Prize
**Scenery** - **Zhang Lu**; City: Hall - Jeong Jae-eun; Forest Dancing - Kang Seok-pil; Jeju Prayer - Im Heung-soon; Lazy Hitchhikers' Tour de Europe - Lee Ho-jae; Nora Noh - Kim Sung-hee; On the Road: Bhikkuni Buddhist Nuns - Lee Chang-jae	**City: Hall** - **Jeong Jae-eun**
Best Actor	Best Actress
**Nam Yeon-woo** - **Fatal**; Kang Shin-hyo - The Russian Novel; Kim Su-hyeon - Sleepless Night; Lee David - Pluto; Lee Joon - Rough Play; Uhm Tae-goo - Ingtoogi: The Battle of Internet Trolls	**Jung Eun-chae** - **Nobody's Daughter Haewon**; Jung Yu-mi - Our Sunhi; Kim Ju-ryeong - Sleepless Night; Park Ji-soo - Mai Ratima; Yang Jo-ah - Fatal; Yoon Jin-seo - Do You Hear She Sings?
Best New Actor/Actress	Best Cinematography
**Lee Joon** - **Rough Play**; Jung Eun-chae - Nobody's Daughter Haewon; Kang Shin-hyo - The Russian Novel; Kim Su-hyeon - Sleepless Night; Nam Yeon-woo - Fatal; Park Ji-soo - Mai Ratima; Yang Jo-ah - Fatal	**Yang Jeong-hoon** - **Jiseul**; Choi Yong-jin - The Russian Novel; Yun Ji-woon - Pluto
