= 17th Busan International Film Festival =

2012 edition of film festival

- Opening film: Cold War
- Closing film: Television
- Location: Busan, South Korea
- Hosted by: Ahn Sung-ki; Tang Wei
- Festival date: October 4 to October 13, 2012

Busan International Film Festival
- 18th 16th

The 17th Busan International Film Festival was held from October 4 to October 13, 2012 at the Busan Cinema Center and was hosted by Ahn Sung-ki and Chinese actress Tang Wei, who is the first foreign celebrity to host the event.

In this year's festival, a total of 304 films from 75 countries was screened, with 93 serving as world premieres and 39 serving as international premieres. The event was attended by more than 10,000 guests from over 60 countries.

The 304 films, which includes films from countries such as Japan, India, the Philippines, Thailand, and Indonesia, were played on 37 screens in seven theaters in Busan, including Busan Cinema Center, CGV Centum City, Lotte Cinema Centum City, and Megabox Haeundae.

== Program ==
† World premiere
†† International premiere
Award winner

=== Opening Film ===
English title	Original title	Director(s)	Production country/countries	
Cold War	寒戰; Hán Zhàn	Longman Leung; Sunny Luk	Hong Kong, China	†

=== Gala Presentation ===
English title	Original title	Director(s)	Production country/countries	
B-E-D	베드; Bedeu	Park Chul-soo	South Korea	†
Dangerous Liaisons	危險關係	Hur Jin-ho	China	
Doctor	닥터; Dakteo	Kim Sung-hong	South Korea	†
El Condor Pasa	콘돌은 날아간다; Kondoleun Nalaganda	Jeon Soo-il	South Korea	†
National Security	남영동 1985; Namyeong-dong 1985	Chung Ji-young	South Korea	†
Rhino Season	وەرزی کەرگەدەن ، فصل کرگدن	Bahman Ghobadi	Iran	†
The Gardener	باغبان; Bāghbān	Mohsen Makhmalbaf	Iran	

=== A Window on Asian Cinema ===
English title	Original title	Director(s)	Production country/countries	
10+10		Directors: Hou Hsiao-hsien (La Belle Epoque); Arvin Chen (Lane 256); Ya-Chuan Hsiao (Something's Gotta Give); Gillies Ya-che Yang (The Singing Boy); Wang Toon (The Ritual); Shen Ko-Shang (Bus Odyssey); Chu Yen-Ping (The Orphans); Ho Wo-Ding (100); Wu Nien-jen (A Grocery Called Forever); Shaudo Wang (Destined Eruption); Chen Kuo-fu (The Debut); Hou Chi-Jan (Green Island Serenade); Wei Tei-Sheng (Debut); Chen Yu-Hsun (Hippocamp Hair Salon); Chang Tso-Chi (Sparkles); Leon Dai (Key); Cheng Wen-tang (Old Man & Me); Sylvia Chan (The Dusk of Gods); Cheng Yu-Chieh (Unwritten Rules); Chung Mong-Hong (Reverberation)	Taiwan	
A Motor Home Adventure	房車奇遇; Fang Che Qi Yu	Yang Lu	China	†
All Apologies	愛的替身; Ai De Ti Shen	Emily Tang	China	
An End to Killing	止殺; Zhi Sha	Ping Wang	China	
Beautiful 2012		Directors: Gu Changwei (Long Tou); Tsai Ming-liang (Walker); Kim Tae-yong (You Are More Than Beautiful); Ann Hui (My Way)	Hong Kong, China; Taiwan	
Beijing Flickers	有種; Yǒu Zhǒng	Zhang Yuan	China	
Born to Hate...Destined to Love	Ishaqzaade	Habib Faisal	India	
Breakaway	Alagwa	Ian Loreños	Philippines	†
Captive		Brillante Mendoza	Philippines; France	
Cold Bloom	桜並木の満開の下に; Sakura Namiki no Mankai no Shita ni	Atsushi Funahashi	Japan	†
Diablo		Ramon Mez de Guzman	Philippines	††
Distortion	คน โลก จิต	Nonzee Nimibutr	Thailand	††
Eden		Masaharu Take	Japan	†
Fly with the Crane	告訴他們，我乘白鶴去了; Gaosu Tamen, Wo cheng Baihe Qu Le	Li Ruijun	China	
Four Stations	สถานี 4 ภาค; Satanee See Pak	Boonsong Nakphoo	Thailand	††
Full Circle	飛越老人院; Fei Yue Lao Ren Yuan	Zhang Yang	China	††
Girlfriend, Boyfriend	女朋友。男朋友	Gillies Ya-che Yang	Taiwan	
Hello Goodbye	안녕 굿바이; Anyoung Gutbayi	Titien Wattimena	Indonesia; South Korea	†
I.D.		Kamal K. M.	India	
If It's Not Now, Then When?		James Lee	Malaysia	†
Japan's Tragedy	日本の悲劇; Nihon no Higeki	Masahiro Kobayashi	Japan	†
Land of Hope	希望の国; Kibō no Kuni	Sion Sono	Japan	
Like Someone in Love	ライク・サムワン・イン・ラブ; Raiku Samuwan In Rabu	Abbas Kiarostami	Japan; France	
Love in the Buff	春嬌與志明	Pang Ho-Cheung	Hong Kong	
Mekong Hotel		Apichatpong Weerasethakul	Thailand	
Memories Look at Me	記憶望著我; Ji yi wang zhe wo	Fang Song	China	
Mystery	浮城謎事	Lou Ye	China	
Nil		Linton Semage	Sri Lanka; United States	
Odayaka	おだやかな日常; Odayaka na Nichijo	Nobuteru Uchida	Japan; United States	†
Our Homeland	かぞくのくに; Kazoku no kuni	Yang Yong-hi	Japan	
Peculiar Vacation and Other Illnesses	Vakansi Yang Janggal Dan Penyakit Lainnya	Yosep Anggi Noen	Indonesia	
Penance	贖罪; Shokuzai	Kiyoshi Kurosawa	Japan	
Poor Folk		Midi Z	Taiwan; Myanmar	
Postcards from the Zoo	Kebun binatang	Edwin	Indonesia	
Rent-a-Cat	レンタネコ; Rentaneko	Naoko Ogigami	Japan	
Seven Something		Directors: Paween Parijtipanya (14); Adisorn Tresirikasem (21/28); Jira Maligool (42.195)	Thailand	††
Shackled	Posas	Lawrence Fajardo	Philippines	††
Shyamal Uncle Turns off the Lights		Suman Ghosh	India	
Six Degrees of Separation from Lilia Cuntapay		Antoinette Jadaone	Philippines	
Soegija		Garin Nugroho	Indonesia	
Student	Студент	Darezhan Omirbaev	Kazakhstan	
The Cremator	焚屍人	Tao Peng	China	
The Dancer	Sang Penari	Ifa Isfansyah	Indonesia	
Taboor		Vahid Vakilifar	Iran	
Talgat		Zhanna Issabayeva	Kazakhstan	
The Empty Home		Nurbek Egen	Kyrgyzstan	
Thy Womb	Sinapupunan	Brillante Mendoza	Philippines	
Valley of Saints		Musa Syeed	India; United States	
Wildlife	Kalayaan	Adolfo Alix Jr.	Philippines	††

=== New Currents ===
English title	Original title	Director(s)	Production country/countries	
111 Girls	Darbare 111 dokhtar	Nahid Ghobadi; Bijan Zmanpira	Iraq	†
36		Nawapol Thamrongrattanarit	Thailand	††
Apparition	Aparisyon	Isabel Sandoval (credited as Vincent Sandoval)	Philippines	††
Fatal	가시꽃; Gashi Ggot	Lee Don-ku	South Korea	†
Filmistaan		Nitin Kakkar	India	†
Kayan		Maryam Najafi	Lebanon; Canada	
The Town Of Whales		Keiko Tsuruoka	Japan	††
Together	甜・祕密; Tian mi mi	Hsu Chae-Jen	Taiwan	†
Touch of the Light	逆光飛翔; Ni guang fei xiang	Chang Jung-Chi	Taiwan	††
Your Time Is Up	누구나 제 명에 죽고 싶다; Nuguna Je Myeonge Jokgo Shipda	Kim Sung-hyun	South Korea	†

=== Korean Cinema Today - Panorama ===
English title	Original title	Director(s)	Production country/countries	
Architecture 101	건축학개론; Geonchukhakgaeron (lit. "Introduction to Architecture")	Lee Yong-ju	South Korea	
Behind the Camera	뒷담화: 감독이 미쳤어요; Dwitdamhwa: Gamdokyi Micheotseoyo	E J-yong	South Korea	†
The Concubine	후궁: 제왕의 첩 Hugoong: Jewangui Chub (lit. "Royal Concubine: Concubine to the King")	Kim Dae-seung	South Korea	
A Muse	은교; Eun-gyo	Jung Ji-woo	South Korea	
Helpless	화차; Hwa-cha	Byun Young-joo	South Korea	
In Another Country	다른 나라에서; Dareun Naraeseo	Hong Sang-soo	South Korea	
My Way	마이 웨이; Mai Wei	Kang Je-gyu	South Korea	
Nameless Gangster: Rules of the Time	범죄와의 전쟁; Bumchoiwaui Junjaeng (lit. "War on Crime: The Golden Age of the Bad Guys")	Yoon Jong-bin	South Korea	
Perfect Number	용의자X; Yonguija X (lit. "Suspect X")	Bang Eun-jin	South Korea	
Pietà	피에타	Kim Ki-duk	South Korea	
The Taste of Money	돈의 맛 Donui Mat	Im Sang-soo	South Korea	
Touch	터치; Teochi	Min Byung-hun	South Korea	†
Tumbleweed	창수; Changsoo	Lee Duk-hee	South Korea	†
The Ugly Duckling	미운오리새끼; Miwoonorisaeggi	Kwak Kyung-taek	South Korea	
The Weight	무게; Muge	Jeon Kyu-hwan	South Korea	
Two Weddings and a Funeral	두 번의 결혼식과 한 번의 장례식; Du Beon-ui Gyeol-hon-sik-gwa Han Beon-ui Jang-nye-sik	Kim Jho Kwang-soo	South Korea	
The Winter of the Year was Warm	내가 고백을 하면; Naega Gobaekeul Hamyeon	David Cho	South Korea	

=== Korean Cinema Today - Vision ===
English title	Original title	Director(s)	Production country/countries	
Azooma	공정사회; Gongjeongsahoe	Lee Ji-seung	South Korea	†
Jiseul	지슬	O Muel	South Korea	†
Love in 42.9	낭만파 남편의 편지; Nangmanpa Nampyeonui Pyeonji	Choi Wi-ahn	South Korea	†
Mai Ratima	마이 라띠마; Ma-i Rattima	Yoo Ji-tae	South Korea	†
Melo	멜로; Mello	Roy Lee (South Korea)	South Korea	†
Over and Over Again	개똥이; Gaeddongyi	Kim Byung-june	South Korea	†
Pluto	명왕성; Myungwangsung	Shin Su-won	South Korea	†
Sunshine Boys	1999, 면회; 1999, Myeonhee	Kim Tae-gon	South Korea	†
The Russian Novel	러시안 소설; Reosian Soseol	Shin Yeon-shick	South Korea	†
The Sound of Memories		Lee Gong-hee	South Korea	†

=== Korean Cinema Retrospective ===
==== Shin Young-kyun, the Male Icon of Korean Cinema: From Farmhand to King ====
English title	Director(s)	Production country/countries
Love Me Once Again	Jung So-young	South Korea
Prince Daewon	Shin Sang-ok	South Korea
Red Scarf	Shin Sang-ok	South Korea
Rice	Shin Sang-ok	South Korea
Spring, Spring	Kim Soo-young	South Korea
The Homeless Wanderer	Shin Sang-ok	South Korea
The Power for Ten Years	Im Kwon-taek	South Korea
Towards the High Place	Lim Won-sik	South Korea

=== World Cinema ===
English title	Original title	Director(s)	Production country/countries	
3		Pablo Stoll	Uruguay; Argentina; Germany	
A Royal Affair	En kongelig affære	Nikolaj Arcel	Denmark; Sweden; Czech Republic; Germany	
A Special Day	Un giorno speciale	Francesca Comencini	Italy	††
Abigail Harm		Lee Isaac Chung	United States; Hong Kong, China	
After Lucia	Después de Lucía	Michel Franco	Mexico	†
Antiviral		Brandon Cronenberg	Canada	
Argo		Ben Affleck	United States	
Barbara		Christian Petzold	Germany	
Beasts of the Southern Wild		Benh Zeitlin	United States	
Berberian Sound Studio		Peter Strickland	United Kingdom	
Beyond the Hills	După dealuri	Cristian Mungiu	Romania; France	
Blancanieves		Pablo Berger	Spain; France	
Blood Pressure		Sean Garrity	Canada	†
Caesar Must Die	Cesare deve morire	Paolo Taviani; Vittorio Taviani	Italy	
Calm at Sea	La mer à l'aube	Volker Schlöndorff	France; Germany	
Comes a Bright Day		Simon Aboud	United Kingdom	
Dormant Beauty	Bella addormentata	Marco Bellocchio	Italy; France	
Dust on Our Hearts	Staub auf unseren Herzen	Hanna Doose	Germany	††
Eat Sleep Die	Äta sova dö	Gabriela Pichler	Sweden	
Eden		Megan Griffiths	United States	
Good Vibrations		Lisa Barros D'Sa; Glenn Leyburn	United Kingdom; Ireland	
Here and There	Aquí y allá	Antonio Méndez Esparza	Spain; United States; Mexico	
Holy Motors		Leos Carax	France	
Horses of God	Les chevaux de Dieu يا خيل الله; Yakheel Allah	Nabil Ayouch	Morocco; France; Belgium	
If Only Everyone	Եթե բոլորը	Nataliya Belyauskene	Armenia	
Imagine		Andrzej Jakimowski	Poland; France; Portugal	
In the Fog	В тумане	Sergei Loznitsa	Germany; Russia; Latvia; Netherlands; Belarus	
Just the Wind	Csak a szél	Benedek Fliegauf	Hungary	
Kill Me	Töte mich	Emily Atef	Germany; Switzerland; France	
Kinshasa Kids		Marc-Henri Wajnberg	Belgium	
La Playa DC		Juan Andrés Arango	Colombia; Brazil; France	
Laurence Anyways		Xavier Dolan	Canada; France	
Le Grand Soir		Benoît Delépine; Gustave de Kervern	France; Belgium	
Lore		Cate Shortland	Australia	
Love	Amour	Michael Haneke	France; Germany; Austria	
The Passion of Marie	Balladen om Marie (lit. "The Ballad of Marie")	Bille August	Denmark	††
Material		Craig Freimond	South Africa	
Mía		Javier van de Couter	Argentina	
Nairobi Half Life		David 'Tosh' Gitonga	Kenya; Germany	
Nick		Fow Pyng Hu	Netherlands	††
Night of Silence	Lal Gece	Reis Çelik	Turkey	
Noor		Çagla Zencirci; Guillaume Giovanetti	France; Pakistan	
Paradise: Love	Paradies: Liebe	Ulrich Seidl	Austria; Germany; France	
Pilgrim Hill		Gerard Barrett	Ireland	
Post Tenebras Lux		Carlos Reygadas	Mexico; France; Netherlands; Germany	
Purge	Puhdistus	Antti Jokinen	Finland; Estonia	††
Reality		Matteo Garrone	Italy; France	
Reported Missing	Die Vermissten	Jan Speckenbach	Germany	
Salt	Sal	Diego Rougier	Chile; Argentina	††
Shell		Scott Graham	United Kingdom	
Sky Force 3D		Tony Tang	Hong Kong, China; United States	
Sofia and the Stubborn	Sofía y el Terco	Andres Burgos Vallejo	Colombia; Peru	
Something in the Air	Après mai	Olivier Assayas	France	
Still Mine		Michael McGowan	Canada	††
The Angels' Share		Ken Loach	United Kingdom; France; Belgium; Italy	
The Commander and the Stork	Il comandante e la cicogna	Silvio Soldini	Italy; Switzerland	†
The Dandelions	Du vent dans mes mollets	Carine Tardieu	France	††
The Domino Effect		Paula van der Oest	Netherlands	††
The Fifth Season	La cinquième saison	Peter Brosens; Jessica Woodworth	Belgium	
The Good Lie		Shawn Linden	Canada	††
The Hunt	Jagten	Thomas Vinterberg	Denmark	
The Last Sentence	Dom över död man (lit. "Judgement on the Dead")	Jan Troell	Sweden; Norway	
The Last Time I Saw Macao	A Última Vez Que Vi Macau	João Pedro Rodrigues; João Rui Guerra da Mata	Portugal; France	
The Man Who Laughs	L'homme qui rit	Jean-Pierre Améris	France; Czech Republic	
The Patience Stone	سنگ صبور	Atiq Rahimi	France; Germany; Afghanistan	
The Pirogue	La Pirogue	Moussa Touré	France; Senegal; Germany	
The Sapphires		Wayne Blair	Australia	
The Sessions		Ben Lewin	United States	
The Woman Who Brushed Off Her Tears		Teona Strugar Mitevska	Macedonia	
Violeta Went to Heaven	Violeta se fue a los cielos	Andrés Wood	Chile; Argentina; Brazil	
Water		Yona Rozenkier	Israel; Palestine; France	
White Belly	Ventre blanc	Jordi Lara	Spain	†
Woman's Lake	Frauensee	Zoltan Paul	Germany	
Yuma		Piotr Mularuk	Poland; Czech Republic	

=== Flash Forward ===
English title	Original title	Director(s)	Production country/countries	
All Musicians Are Bastards	Kõik muusikud on kaabakad	Heleri Saarik	Estonia	†
Annelie		Antej Farac	Germany; Switzerland	†
Flower Buds	Poupata	Zdeněk Jiráský	Czech Republic	††
Für Elise		Wolfgang Dinslage	Germany	††
State of Emergency	Avariynoe sostoyanie	Vsevolod Bennigsen	Russia	††
Steel	Acciaio	Stefano Mordini	Italy	††
The Crack	El resquicio	Alfonso Acosta	Colombia; Argentina	†
The Scar		Jimmy Larouche	Canada	††

=== Wide Angle ===
==== Korean Short Film Competition ====
English title	Director(s)	Production country/countries	
A Day Worth Dying For	Byun Hyun-a	South Korea	†
Choongshim, Soso	Kim Jung-in	South Korea	†
Dug-Goo TV	Shin Min-hee	South Korea	†
Last Night	Bae Du-ri	South Korea	†
Mackerel	Lee Seol-hee	South Korea	†
Mija	Jeon Hyo-jeong	South Korea	†
Miss Longlegs	Yun Mo	South Korea	†
Night Market	Kim Tae-yong	South Korea	†
Spring on Campus	Ahn Seung-hyuk	South Korea	†
Suffocation	Kwon Oh-kwang	South Korea	†
The Knitting	Yoon Eun-hye	South Korea	†
The Night of the Witness	Park Buem	South Korea	†
The Trace	Chung Ji-yun	South Korea	†
Unlawful Love	Kim Jun-sung	South Korea	†

==== Asian Short Film Competition ====
English title	Director(s)	Production country/countries	
A Little Farther	Nikan Nezami	Iran	†
Aurora, My Aurora	Janus Victoria	Philippines	†
Daily Life	Chang Chia Yun	Taiwan	††
I Offered You Pleasure	Farah Shaer	Lebanon	†
Late Shift	Edward Khoo	Singapore	†
Oriole	Kaynipa Polnikorn	Thailand	†
Saba	Roqiye Tavakoli	Iran	†
The Artist	Siddartha Jatla	India	†
The Container	Abu Shahed Emon	Bangladesh; South Korea	†
The Lowest Extremities	Farhad Qazi	United Arab Emirates	††
The Outpost	Sayed Jalal Hussaini	Afghanistan	†
This Is London	Mohammed Rashed Buali	Bahrain; United Arab Emirates	††
Transferring	Junichi Kanai	Japan	††

==== Short Film Showcase ====
English title	Director(s)	Production country/countries	
Convenience	Sam McKeith; Tom McKeith	Australia	†
Cut To Fit	Giovanni La Parola	Italy	††
Kiruna-Kigali	Goran Kapetanović	Sweden; Rwanda	†
Plot	Pavle Vuckovic	Serbia	†
When Bucketwheet Flowers Blossom	Ahn Jae-hun; Han Hye-jin	South Korea	†

==== Documentary Competition ====
English title	Director(s)	Production country/countries	
Anxiety	Min Hwan-ki	South Korea	†
Char... The No-Man's Island	Sourav Sarangi	India	†
Embers	Tamara Stepanyan	Lebanon; Qatar; Armenia	†
Forest Dancing	Kang Seok-pil	South Korea	†
Go Grandriders	Hua Tien-Hao	Taiwan	††
In God's Land	Pankaj Rishi Kumar	India	†
Serenade	Benito Bautista	Philippines	††
The Cat that Lived a Million Times	Tadasuke Kotani	Japan	†
Tour of Duty	Kim Dong-ryeong, Park Gyeong-tae	South Korea	†
Wellang Trei	Kim Tae-il	South Korea	†

==== Documentary Showcase ====
English title	Director(s)	Production country/countries	
5 Broken Cameras	Emad Burnat; Guy Davidi	Palestine; Israel; France; Netherlands	
A Better Life Is Elsewhere	Rolando Colla	Switzerland; Bosnia and Herzegovina	††
Beyond School	Kim Han-kook	South Korea	†
Captain Kang	Won Ho-yeon	South Korea	†
Chiri/Trace	Naomi Kawase	Japan	
El Maestro Saharaui	Nicolás Muñoz	Spain	
King Hu	Hubert Niogret	France	†
Magic Words (Breaking a Spell)	Mercedes Moncada	Mexico	
My Name Is Negahdar Jamali and I Make Westerns	Kamran Heidari	Iran	†
Paramedico	Benjamin Gilmour	Australia	††
Polluting Paradise	Fatih Akın	Germany	
Still I Strive	Adam Pfleghaar; A. Todd Smith	Cambodia; United States	†
The End of Time	Peter Mettler	Switzerland; Canada	
Theater 1	Kazuhiro Soda	Japan; United States; France	†
Theater 2	Kazuhiro Soda	Japan; United States; France	†
Three Sisters	Wang Bing	China	
Tony Rayns and a Quarter Century of Korean Cinema	Seo Won-tae	South Korea	

==== Animation Showcase ====
English title	Original title	Director(s)	Production country/countries
Arjun: The Warrior Prince		Arnab Chaudhuri	India
Ernest & Celestine	Ernest et Célestine	Stéphane Aubier; Vincent Patar; Benjamin Renner	France; Belgium; Luxembourg
The Life of Budori Gusuko	グスコーブドリの伝記; Guskō Budori no Denki	Gisaburō Sugii	Japan

=== Open Cinema ===
English title	Original title	Director(s)	Production country/countries	
A Werewolf Boy	늑대소년; Neukdae Sonyeon (lit. "Wolf Boy")	Jo Sung-hee	South Korea	
Barfi!		Anurag Basu	India	
Don't Cry Mommy	돈 크라이 마미; Don keurai Mami	Kim Yong-han	South Korea	†
My Father's Bike	Mój rower	Piotr Trzaskalski	Poland	
Pinocchio		Enzo D'Alò	Italy; Luxembourg; Belgium; France	††
Rurouni Kenshin	るろうに剣心	Keishi Ōtomo	Japan	††
Tai Chi 0	太極之零開始	Stephen Fung	China	
The Thieves	도둑들; Dodukdeul	Choi Dong-hoon	South Korea	

=== Special Program in Focus ===
==== The Eternal Travelers for Freedom: Sergei Parajanov and Mikhail Vartanov ====
English title	Director(s)	Production country/countries
Arabesques On The Pirosmani Theme	Sergei Parajanov	Georgia
Ashik Kerib	Sergei Parajanov; Dodo Abashidze	Georgia
Parajanov: The Last Spring	Mikhail Vartanov; Sergei Parajanov	Armenia; United States
The Color of Armenian Land	Mikhail Vartanov	Armenia
Autumn Pastoral	Mikhail Vartanov	Armenia
Erased Faces	Mikhail Vartanov	Armenia
Shadows of Forgotten Ancestors	Sergei Parajanov	Ukraine
The Color of Pomegranates	Sergei Parajanov	Armenia
The Legend of Suram Fortress	Sergei Parajanov; Dodo Abashidze	Georgia
Ukrainian Rhapsody	Sergei Parajanov	Ukraine

==== Afghanistan National Film Archive: The Rise from the Ashes ====
English title	Director(s)	Production country/countries
Akhtar the Clown	Latif Ahmadi	Afghanistan
Like Eagle	Faiz Mohammad Khairzada	Afghanistan
Love Epic	Latif Ahmadi	Afghanistan
Once Upon a Time	Khaleq A’lil, Mohmmad Ali Rownaq, Sultan Hamid Hashem	Afghanistan
Rabia Balkhie	Abdullah Shadan; Mohammad Nazir	Afghanistan
The Stranger	Siddiq Barmak	Afghanistan

==== Poland in Close-up: The Great Polish Masters ====
English title	Director(s)	Production country/countries
Night Train	Jerzy Kawalerowicz	Poland
Bad Luck	Andrzej Munk	Poland
The Saragossa Manuscript	Wojciech Has	Poland
Identification Marks: None	Jerzy Skolimowski	Poland
Cul-de-sac	Roman Polanski	Poland
The Promised Land	Andrzej Wajda	Poland
Blind Chance	Krzysztof Kieślowski	Poland
A Year of the Quiet Sun	Krzysztof Zanussi	Poland
Crows	Dorota Kędzierzawska	Poland
In Darkness	Agnieszka Holland	Poland

==== Arturo Ripstein: Four Stories of Captive Minds ====
English title	Director(s)	Production country/countries
Life Sentence	Arturo Ripstein	Mexico
The Beginning and the End	Arturo Ripstein	Mexico
The Castle of Purity	Arturo Ripstein	Mexico
The Realm of Fortune	Arturo Ripstein	Mexico

==== Cinema Archaeology ====
English title	Director(s)	Production country/countries
Birth of Happiness	Park Sang-ho	South Korea
Father of a Soldier	Rezo Chkheidze	Georgia
Red Scarf	Shin Sang-ok	South Korea
Side by Side	Christopher Kenneally	United States

==== Special Screening ====
English title	Original title	Director(s)	Production country/countries	
009 RE:CYBORG		Kenji Kamiyama	Japan	†
Comrade Kim Goes Flying		Anja Daelemans; Nicholas Bonner; Kim Gwang-hun	Belgium; United Kingdom; North Korea	
Ghost in the Shell: Stand Alone Complex - Solid State Society	攻殻機動隊 STAND ALONE COMPLEX Solid State Society; Kōkaku Kidōtai STAND ALONE COMPLEX Solid State Society	Kenji Kamiyama	Japan	
Mishima	11・25自決の日 三島由紀夫と若者たち; 11.25 Jiketsu no Hi: Mishima Yukio to Wakamonotachi (lit. "11:25 The Day He Chose His Own Fate")	Kōji Wakamatsu	Japan	
Petrel Hotel Blue	海燕ホテル・ブルー; Kaien Hoteru · Buru (lit. "Kaien Hotel in Blue")	Kōji Wakamatsu	Japan	
Soar into the Sun	알투비: 리턴투베이스; Altubi: Riteontu Be-iseu (lit. "R2B: Return to Base)	Kim Dong-won	South Korea	
The Great Flight	위대한 비행; Widaehan Bihaeng	Jin Jae-un	South Korea	†
The Millennial Rapture	千年の愉楽; Sennen no Yuraku	Kōji Wakamatsu	Japan	
Wish You Were Here		Kieran Darcy-Smith	Australia	

=== Midnight Passion ===
English title	Original title	Director(s)	Production country/countries
Chained		Jennifer Lynch	Canada
Chaos	Désordres	Etienne Faure	France
Compliance		Craig Zobel	United States
Gangs of Wasseypur – Part 1	Gangs of वासेपुर	Anurag Kashyap	India
Gangs of Wasseypur – Part 2	Gangs of वासेपुर II	Anurag Kashyap	India
Modus Anomali		Joko Anwar	Indonesia
Shadow People		Matthew Arnold	United States
Sinister		Scott Derrickson	United States
Stitches		Conor McMahon	Ireland
The Fourth State	Die Vierte Macht	Dennis Gansel	Germany
Vanishing Waves	Aurora	Kristina Buožytė	Lithuania

=== Closing Film ===
English title	Original title	Director(s)	Production country/countries	
Television	টেলিভিশন	Mostofa Sarwar Farooki	Bangladesh	†

== Awards ==
- New Currents Award
  - 36 - Nawapol Thamrongrattanarit (Thailand)
  - Kayan - Maryam Najafi (Lebanon/Canada)
  - Special Mention: Filmistaan - Nitin Kakkar (India)
- Flash Forward Award
  - Flower Buds - Zdeněk Jiráský (Czech Republic)
- Sonje Award
  - A Little Farther - Nikan Nezami (Iran)
  - The Night of the Witness - Park Buem (South Korea)
  - Special Mention: Transferring - Junichi Kanai (Japan)
- BIFF Mecenat Award
  - Embers - Tamara Stepanyan (Lebanon/Qatar/Armenia)
  - Anxiety - Min Hwan-ki (South Korea)
  - Special Mention: Wellang Trei - Kim Tae-il (South Korea)
- FIPRESCI Award
  - 36 - Nawapol Thamrongrattanarit (Thailand)
- NETPAC Award
  - Jiseul - O Muel (South Korea)
- KNN Movie Award
  - Touch of the Light - Chang Jung-Chi (Taiwan)
- DGK Award
  - Director: O Muel (Jiseul) (South Korea)
  - Director: Shin Yeon-shick (The Russian Novel) (South Korea)
  - Actor: Shim Hee-sub, Ahn Jae-hong, Kim Chang-hwan (Sunshine Boys) (South Korea)
  - Actress: Jang Young-nam (Azooma) (South Korea)
- Busan Cinephile Award
  - 5 Broken Cameras - Emad Burnat, Guy Davidi (Palestine Israel, France, Netherlands)
- Citizen Reviewers' Award
  - Jiseul - O Muel (South Korea)
- CGV Movie Collage Award
  - Jiseul - O Muel (South Korea)
- Korean Cinema Award
  - Hayashi Kanako (Japan)
- Asian Filmmaker of the Year
  - Kōji Wakamatsu (Japan)
