= Kim Su-hyeon =

Kim Su-hyeon, Kim Soo-hyun, or Kim Su-hyon (Korean: 김수현) is the name of:

- Kim Soo-hyun (writer) (born 1943), South Korean writer
- Kim Su-hyeon (actor, born 1970), South Korean actor
- Claudia Kim (born 1985, Korean name Kim Soo-hyun), South Korean actress
- Kim Soo-hyun (born 1988), South Korean actor
- Kim Su-hyeon (weightlifter) (born 1995), South Korean weightlifter

== See also ==
- Kim So-hyun
