= Ungok Wetland =

Wetland in Jeollabuk-do, South Korea

- Interactive map of Ungok Wetland
- Location: Gochang District, Jeollabuk-do, South Korea

Ramsar Wetland
- Designated: 6 April 2011
- Reference no.: 1948

Ungok Wetland is located in Gochang District, Jeollabuk-do, South Korea. It includes the Ungok Lake and Obaygol low moor. Ungok Wetland was previously considered as a typical wetland damaged region due to the use of Obaygol low moor for rice paddy cultivation. However, going through the process of restoration, Ungok Wetland has been once again restored into a form of primitive wetland.

== Significance ==
Ungok Wetland is important because it was previously abandoned farmland that is being restored as a low-rise wetland and has a high value of practical use. Also, the wetland supports important species that are endangered which contributes to the protection of the wildlife; it is the habitat of 6 species of endangered animals and plants. It is also a habitat of 549 species of rare variety listed in Korea Forest Service: 459 species of plants, 11 species of mammals, 48 species of birds and nine species of reptiles.

The Ungok Wetland is surrounded by natural forest and the important dolmen monument in Gochang district. The wetland has high valued and potential of being utilized as ecology sight-seeing with the dolmen monument in Gochang which is designated as the world heritage. This Gochang dolmen is considered to be the biggest dolmen community in South Korea, and it is a highly significant site.

== Conservation Movement ==
The Korean Ministry of Environment is planning to have detailed investigation on periodic ecology of the Ungok Wetland along with the Dongbaekdongsan Wetland in Jeuju Island. The Ministry of Environment is constantly going to monitor and reinforce the wetland preservation activities.

== Organisms ==
- Chinese water deer (Hydropotes inermis)
- Seoul frog (Pelophylax chosenicus)
- Common kestrel (Falco tinnunculus)
- Chinese goshawk (Accipiter soloensis)
