= Lee Bit-na =

South Korean actress (born 1995)

- Born: August 29, 1995 (age 31); South Korea
- Occupations: Actress; model
- Years active: 2009–present
- Agent: Urban Works Media

Korean name
- Hangul: 이빛나
- RR: I Bitna
- MR: I Pinna

Lee Bit-na (Korean: 이빛나, born August 29, 1995) is a South Korean actress.

== Early life ==
Lee was born on August 29, 1995.

== Career ==
Lee started her acting career in 2009 and acted in her first television drama 4 years later, in 2013. She is signed under Urban Works Entertainment.

== Filmography ==
=== Film ===
Year	Title	Role	Notes/Ref.
2009	Descendants of Hong Gil-Dong	Food Styling	
2010	A Long Visit	Mi-jung (14 years old)	
2011	My Long Journey In The Sunshine	Mi-ji (young)	
2012	The Russian Novel	Ga-rim	
2013	Rough Play	Advertisement Girl	
2015	The Avian Kind	Bit-na	
2015	Tattoo	High School Girl 1	
2016	Dongju: The Portrait of a Poet	Yun Dong-ju's younger sister	
2016	End Of April	Joo-hee	
2016	Wonderful World	Han Bok-hee	

=== Television ===
Year	Title	Role
2013	Family Pang	Yoon Bit-na
2014	Steal Heart	Hyun-jung
2014	Magic Thousand Character Classic	Son Ban-ji
2015	Heart to Heart	Cha Hong-do (teens / ep.1)
2015	Wedding Story: "Yang Zone Couple's 100 Year Story"	Choi Jeom-nam (young)
2015	In Still Green Days	Oh Jin-sook
2015	Divorce Lawyer in Love	Go Cheok-hee (young)
2015	Cheo Yong 2	Lee Ji-yeon (ep.8)
2016	Weightlifting Fairy Kim Bok-joo	Bitna

=== Web series ===
Year	Title	Role
2015	Noble, My Love	Choi Ra-mi
2016	Hot & Sweet	High School Student

=== Music video appearances ===
Year	Song title	Artist
2011	"Cry Out With My Heart"	J-Cera ft. December
2012	"Because I Don't Know"	SpinEL
2015	"I Will Love You Like Now"	2BiC

== Endorsements ==
Year	Product	Notes
2011	Chungjunwon Hongcho	
2012	Paldo Bibimyeon	
2013	SK Telekom	
2016	J-Route	CF for Japan Trips
