= Saving My Hubby =

- Theatrical poster
- Hangul: 굳세어라 금순아
- RR: Gutseeora Geumsuna
- MR: Kusseŏra Kŭmsuna
- Directed by: Hyun Nam-seop
- Written by: Hyun Nam-seop
- Produced by: Seo Jun-won; Song Seung-hwan; Lee Gwang-ho; Kwon Jun-hyeong
- Starring: Bae Doona; Kim Tae-woo
- Cinematography: Choi Young-hwan
- Edited by: Kyung Min-ho
- Music by: Angelo Lee
- Distributed by: Korea Pictures
- Release date: October 18, 2002
- Running time: 91 minutes
- Country: South Korea
- Language: Korean
- Budget: US$1.8 million
- Box office: US$535,850

Saving My Hubby (Korean: 굳세어라 금순아; lit. 'Be Brave, Geum-soon!') is a 2002 South Korean film starring Bae Doona, and is the directorial debut of Hyun Nam-seop.

== Plot ==
Due to an unplanned pregnancy, twenty-something former volleyball star Geum-soon is now a married housewife with a young daughter. Her husband, Joo-tae, is starting the first day of his new job, when Geum-soon receives word that her in-laws are going to visit the following morning. While she struggles to get their house ready, Joo-tae is taken out for a drink with his new colleagues. Later that evening, Geum-soon gets a phone call from a nightclub owner who is holding her husband hostage, claiming that he has run up a huge bill and does not have the money to pay for it. Strapping her baby to her back, Geum-soon sets out to rescue her husband.

== Cast ==
- Bae Doona as Jeong Geum-soon
- Kim Tae-woo as Han Joo-tae
- Lee Chan-min as Song-yi
- Joo Hyun as Baek-sa
- Go Doo-shim as Geum-soon's mother
- Han Ji-hye as convenience store clerk
- Na Moon-hee
- Kim Su-hyeon
- Ahn Gil-kang
- Gi Ju-bong
- Lee Ju-sil
- Kim Kkot-bi
- Kim Kwang-sik
- Jang Yong
- Yoon Young-geol
- Yoo Seung-mok
- Heo Hyun-ho
- Kim Sun-hwa
- Choi Hak-rak
- Kim Ji-young as room salon hostess 1
- Kim Jin-goo as neighborhood grandmother
- Son Young-soon as flower-selling grandmother
- Ki Guk-seo as boss of Crown Gang
- Cha Soon-bae
