= When Spring Comes (2022 film) =

2022 South Korean film

- Theatrical release poster
- Hangul: 봄날
- Lit.: Spring Day
- RR: Bomnal
- MR: Pomnal
- Directed by: Lee Don-ku
- Screenplay by: Lee Don-ku
- Starring: Son Hyun-joo; Park Hyuk-kwon; Jung Seok-yong; Son Sook; Park So-jin; Jung Ji-hwan
- Production company: MCMC
- Distributed by: Contents Panda
- Release date: April 27, 2022
- Running time: 102 minutes
- Country: South Korea
- Language: Korean
- Box office: est. US$189,423

When Spring Comes (Korean: 봄날; RR: Bomnal; lit. 'Spring Day') is a 2022 South Korean film directed by Lee Don-ku, starring Son Hyun-joo, Park Hyuk-kwon, Jung Seok-yong, Son Sook, Park So-jin and Jung Ji-hwan. The film depicts the story of a man trying to make big money at his father's funeral where all of his acquaintances have gathered, and gets caught up in an uncontrollable incident. It was released theatrically on April 27, 2022.

== Synopsis ==
Ho-seong (Park Hyuk-kwon) who was once a powerful figure in a criminal organization is released from prison after 8 years. Now, his younger brother Jong-seong (Park Hyuk-kwon) is treated as a nuisance, and his eldest daughter Eun-ok (Park So-jin), who is about to get married, and his son Dong-hyuk (Jung Ji-hwan), whom he met after a long time, are ashamed of him. At the funeral of his father, where all his acquaintances are gathered, Ho-seong plans to collect condolence money and start a new business, dreaming of a second heyday. But, two rival gangs fighting for power arrive at the funeral. At the same time, Hoseong's friend Yang-hee (Jung Seok-yong), who has no clue, gets drunk and starts acting unrecoverable.

== Cast ==
- Son Hyun-joo as Ho-seong
- Park Hyuk-kwon as Jong-seong, Ho-seong's younger brother
- Jung Seok-yong as Yang-hee, Ho-seong's hometown friend
- Park So-jin as Eun-ok, Ho-seong's eldest daughter
- Jung Ji-hwan as Dong-hyuk, Ho-seong's youngest son
- Son Sook as Jeong-nim, Ho-seong's mother
- Lee Ji-hoon as The person who protects Ho-seong

== Production ==
Principal photography began on April 20, 2021.
