= Park Min-jung =

South Korean actress (born 1982)

- Born: 12 March 1982 (age 44); South Korea
- Other name: Park Min-jeong
- Education: Korea National University of Arts (Theater Academy acting in master)
- Occupations: Actress; producer; musical actress; theater actress
- Years active: 2003–present
- Agent: Alien Company
- Spouse: Park Hoon (m. 2017)

Korean name
- Hangul: 박민정
- RR: Bak Minjeong
- MR: Pak Minjŏng

Park Min-jung (Korean: 박민정; born 12 March 1982) is a South Korean actress. She is known for her roles in dramas such as The Smile Has Left Your Eyes, Mad Dog, The Tale of Nokdu and Nobody Knows. She also appeared in movies The Wrath, S.I.U, The Concubine and The Russian Novel.

== Personal life ==
Park Min-jung married actor Park Hoon in 2017 and they have also worked together on screen.

== Filmography ==
=== Television series ===
Year	Title	Role	Ref.
2012	The Great Seer	In-yeong	
2014	God's Gift: 14 Days	Mimi	
2014	Love Frequency 37.2	Customer	
2015	Six Flying Dragons	Heuk-cheop Seon-hwa	
2015	The Village: Achiara's Secret	Town Lady	
2016	Dr. Romantic	Min-jung	
2016	Memory	Policewoman Choi	
2016	On the Way to the Airport	Ms. Kim	
2017	Mad Dog	Lee Young-mi	
2017	My Father Is Strange	Actress	
2018	Lawless Lawyer	Yoo Kyung-jin	
2018	The Smile Has Left Your Eyes	Hwang Sun-hwa	
2019	The Tale of Nokdu	Queen Yu	
2020	Nobody Knows	Bae Sun-ah	
2022	The First Responders	Seo Mi-jung	
2022	A Superior Day	Detective Chu	
2023	The First Responders 2	Seo Mi-jung	

=== Web series ===
Year	Title	Role	Notes	Ref.
2022	Soundtrack 1	Marie	Special appearance	
2023	Bloodhounds	Madame Im		

=== Film ===
Year	Title		Role
Year	English	Korean	Role
2006	Don't Look Back	내 청춘에게 고함	Woman dancing tango
2008	His Last Gift	마지막 선물	Bar woman
2008	Do You See Seoul?	서울이 보이냐	Passing lady
2009	Flight	비상	Woman from affair
2011	S.I.U	특수본	In-moo's younger sister
2012	The Concubine	후궁: 제왕의 첩	The Queen
2013	The Russian Novel	러시안 소설	Ji-ae
2017	Real	리얼	Private hospital room nurse
2018	Stand By Me	덕구	Ansan landlord
2018	The Wrath	여곡성	Mrs. Han
2021	Spiritwalker	유체이탈자	Cake Lady
2024	While You Were Sleeping	당신이 잠든 사이	Yeo Yeong-mi
2024	Revolver	리볼버	Bodyguard
2024	Devils Stay	사흘	Ji-yeon

== Awards and nominations ==
Year	Award	Category	Nominee / Work	Result	Ref.
2005	Miryang Arts Festival	Best Actress	Park Min-jung	Won	
