= Joo Ye-rim =

South Korean actress (born 2011)

- Born: 11 October 2011 (age 15)
- Occupation: Actress
- Years active: 2018–present
- Works: Filmography
- Awards: Female Youth Acting Award at the 2019 KBS Drama Awards

Korean name
- Hangul: 주예림
- RR: Ju Yerim
- MR: Chu Yerim

Joo Ye-rim (Korean: 주예림; born on 11 October 2011) is a South Korean child actress. She began her acting career in 2018, with TV series Mistress since then, she has appeared in number of television series and films. She is known for her roles as child actor in 2019 film The House of Us as Yu Jin and family drama Mother of Mine as Jeong Da-bin. She has also appeared in Monstrum, a 2018 film.

== Career ==
Joo Ye-rim debuted in 2018, with TV series Mistress as daughter of female protagonist, and historical drama film Monstrum portraying child Myung.

In 2019, Joo got break through film The House of Us, which is "brilliant journey of the three musketeers in the neighborhood who went directly instead of adults to solve the problems of 'family'." She also appeared in KBS family drama Mother of Mine as daughter of one of the female lead. For her performance she was awarded female youth acting award at the 2019 KBS Drama Awards.

In 2020, she acted as young Seo Hyun-ju in TV series Men Are Men, which got her nominated for best young actor award at 2020 KBS Drama Awards.

In 2022, she appeared in Netflix original web series The Sound of Magic as young version of female protagonist. She was also cast in film Cassiopeia as daughter of character played by Seo Hyun-jin, who is diagnosed with Alzheimer's disease and slowly turning into a young child due to loss of memory.

== Filmography ==
=== Films ===
| Year | Title | Role | Notes | Ref. |
|---|---|---|---|---|
| 2018 | Monstrum | Myung (child) | | |
| 2019 | Beautiful Voice | Kindergarten child | | |
| 2019 | The House of Us | Yu-jin | | |
| 2022 | Cassiopeia | Gina | | |

=== Television series ===
| Year | Title | Role | Notes | Ref. |
|---|---|---|---|---|
| 2018 | Mistress | Jang Se-yeon's daughter | | |
| 2018 | Big Forest | Jeong Bo-bae | | |
| 2018 | Children of Nobody | Kim Eun-seo | | |
| 2019 | Mother of Mine | Jeong Da-bin | | |
| 2019 | Kill It | young Seul-gi | | |
| 2020 | The Game: Towards Zero | Young Seo Joon-yeong | | |
| 2020 | Men Are Men | Child Seo Hyun-ju | | |
| 2020 | The King: Eternal Monarch | Min-ji | (Ep.1) | |
| 2021 | Mouse | Young Oh Bong-i | | |
| 2022 | Green Mothers' Club | Kim Yu-bin | | |
| 2023 | Tale of the Nine Tailed 1938 | Juk Hyang | | |

=== Web series ===
| Year | Title | Role | Ref. |
|---|---|---|---|
| 2022 | The Sound of Magic | young Yoon Ah-yi | |

== Awards and nominations ==
| Year | Award | Category | Nominated work | Result | Ref. |
|---|---|---|---|---|---|
| 2019 | KBS Drama Awards | Youth Acting Award | Mother of Mine as Jeong Da-bin | Won | |
| 2020 | KBS Drama Awards | Best Young Actor | Men Are Men as Seo Hyun-ju | Nominated | |
