= Perfect Marriage Revenge =

2023 South Korean television series

- Promotional poster
- Hangul: 완벽한 결혼의 정석
- Hanja: 完璧한 結婚의 定石
- Lit.: The Standard of a Perfect Marriage
- RR: Wanbyeokhan gyeolhonui jeongseok
- MR: Wanbyŏkhan kyŏrhonŭi chŏngsŏk
- Genre: Romance; Revenge drama
- Based on: Perfect Marriage Revenge by Lee Beom-bae
- Written by: Im Seo-ra
- Directed by: Oh Sang-won
- Starring: Jung Yoo-min; Sung Hoon; Jin Ji-hee; Kang Shin-hyo; Oh Seung-yoon
- Music by: Jeong Tae-kyung
- Country of origin: South Korea
- Original language: Korean
- No. of episodes: 12

Production
- Executive producer: Park Jae-hoon
- Producers: Hwang Hyuk; Ahn Hyeong-jo; Seo Jang-won
- Running time: 70 minutes
- Production company: Jidam Studio

Original release
- Network: MBN
- Release: October 28 – December 3, 2023

Perfect Marriage Revenge (Korean: 완벽한 결혼의 정석) is a 2023 South Korean television series starring Sung Hoon, Jung Yoo-min, Jin Ji-hee, Kang Shin-hyo, and Oh Seung-yoon. It is based on a web novel of the same name, which was also made into a webtoon. It aired on MBN every Saturday and Sunday at 21:50 (KST) from October 28 to December 3, 2023.

== Synopsis ==
In 2023, Han Yi-joo is the naive adopted eldest daughter of a rich family. Despite their cold and uncaring behavior towards her, she works hard for her family's love and approval, especially her mother, for whom she makes imitations of famous paintings as a hobby. One day, Yi-joo discovers that Lee Jung-hye has not only been defrauding clients by selling the imitations but has also framed her for the crime; later the same day, she finds out that her husband, Yoo Se-hyuk, has feelings for her younger sister and has filed for divorce.

Feeling overwhelmed, Yi-joo runs away and gets into a serious car accident. Although she survives, she is subsequently murdered by Jung-hye's assistant in her hospital bed. She then wakes up in 2022, exactly one year before the accident, when she is still engaged. Deciding to take revenge on both her family and fiancé, she seeks out Seo Do-guk, the man her younger sister has a crush on and proposes to him. He agrees to the marriage but with a condition: to win the trust of his grandmother.

== Cast ==
=== Main ===
- Sung Hoon as Seo Do-guk

A chaebol who refused to take over the family business and started his own successful company, H-terior. He is in love with Yi-joo & later he marries her. In the first timeline he was being pursued by Han Yoo-ra but in the second timeline he married Han Yi-joo and changes her fate.

- Jung Yoo-min as Han Yi-joo

Grew up in an orphanage until she was adopted by a wealthy family, Yi-joo is often pushed aside and unappreciated by her new family but tries hard to please them. Due to a traumatic childhood experience, she cannot eat anything she hasn't personally prepared. In the first timeline, Yi-joo married Se-hyeok, but in the second timeline, she marries Do-guk to change her fate.

- Jin Ji-hee as Han Yoo-ra

Yi-joo's step-sister who is favored by her mother and father. She is spoiled and always tried to beat Yi-joo growing up. She thrives on making Yi-joo's life miserable and wants to marry Do-guk.

- Kang Shin-hyo as Seo Jong-wook

Do-guk's brother and the Vice President of Taeja construction. He fakes a limp because of an accident with Do-guk. He appears kind and friendly, but hides a cruel and vicious nature.

- Oh Seung-yoon as Yoo Se-hyeok

Se-hyeok's father is the chauffeur to the Han family, so he met both Yoo-ra and Yi-joo at an early age. He is in love with Yoo-ra and will do anything for her, including marrying Yi-joo just to be close to her.

=== Supporting ===
Yi-joo's family

- Lee Min-young as Lee Jung-hye

Jin-woong's wife and Yi-joo's stepmother. She is a cold and ruthless social climber who seduced a man to move up in the world. She runs the art gallery as part of the group.

- Jeon No-min as Han Jin-woong

The successor and acting head of Hanwool Financial Group family, Jin-woong is the father of Yoo-ra and Yi-joo. He favors Yoo-ra because he believes that she is biologically related to him.

- Lee Byung-joon as Han Woon-jae

The chairman of Hanwool and patriarch of the Han family.

Do-guk's family

- Ban Hyo-jung as Lee Tae-ja

The matriarch of the Taeja group and grandmother.

- Kim Eung-soo as Seo Young-kyun

The father of Do-guk, Do-na and Jeong-wook. He was abandoned by his first wife and swore to never love again, until he meets Yeon-hwa.

- Lee Mi-sook as Cha Yeon-hwa

Young-kyun's second wife with two kids Do-guk and Do-na. She is a kind stepmother to Jeong-wook.

- Oh Ha-nee as Seo Do-na

Do-guk and Jeong-wook's younger sister who is happily married to Byeon Jae-ho.

People in Do-guk's company

- Lee Myung-hoon as Byeon Jae-ho

Do-na's husband and a secretary at the company.

- Lee Won-hee as Kim Seon-kwon

Se-hyuk's family

- Kim Ye-ryung as Choi Jae-sook

Se-hyuk's mother.

- Song Sui as Yoo Se-hee

Se-hyuk's younger sister and a friend of Yoo-ra.

Others

- Lee Da-hae as Ahn Soo-jin

A reporter who is a friend of Yi-joo and a cousin of Do-na and Do-guk.

- Do-yoo as Kim Jae-won

The manager of Hanwool Financial and Lee Jung-hye's assistant. He executes her commands but he has hidden motives.

=== Extended ===
- Jin Hee-kyung as Lee Ji-won / Jamie

A chef who hosts a cooking class for upper class women, where they often end up matchmaking their kids. She is also Yi-joo's biological mother.

- Kim Jung-tae as Jo Dong-soo

A convict and Lee Jung-hye's old lover. He is Yoo-ra's birth father

=== Special appearance ===
- Hong Seok-cheon as a clothing store owner

== Viewership ==
Perfect Marriage Revenge : South Korea viewers per episode (thousands)

Season	Episode number											
Season	1	2	3	4	5	6	7	8	9	10	11	12
1	N/A	421	384	470	N/A	384	356	514	495	495	568	547

Source: Audience measurement performed nationwide by Nielsen Korea.

Average TV viewership ratings
Ep.	Original broadcast date	Average audience share (Nielsen Korea)	
Ep.	Original broadcast date	Nationwide	Seoul
1	October 28, 2023	1.069% (20th)	N/A
2	October 29, 2023	1.856% (11th)	N/A
3	November 4, 2023	1.926% (10th)	2.240% (5th)
4	November 5, 2023	2.237% (9th)	N/A
5	November 11, 2023	1.586% (14th)	N/A
6	November 12, 2023	1.804% (10th)	N/A
7	November 18, 2023	1.767% (10th)	N/A
8	November 19, 2023	2.331% (6th)	1.429% (8th)
9	November 25, 2023	2.538% (5th)	1.787% (8th)
10	November 26, 2023	2.407% (8th)	1.912% (8th)
11	December 2, 2023	2.943% (6th)	2.726% (3rd)
12	December 3, 2023	2.420% (8th)	1.954% (8th)
Average		2.074%	— (Note: Due to multiple unpublished ratings, the exact average rating is unknown.)
In the table above, the blue numbers represent the lowest ratings and the red numbers represent the highest ratings.; N/A denotes ratings that were not published.; This series airs on a cable channel/pay TV which normally has a relatively smaller audience compared to free-to-air TV/public broadcasters (KBS, SBS, MBC and EBS).
