= Mai Ratima =

- Hangul: 마이 라띠마
- RR: Mai rattima
- MR: Mai rattima
- Directed by: Yoo Ji-tae
- Written by: Im Sun-ae; Yoo Ji-tae
- Produced by: Hong Yeon-jeong; Song Kwang-ik
- Starring: Bae Soo-bin; Park Ji-soo; So Yoo-jin
- Cinematography: Lee Jung-bae; Jang Won-wook
- Edited by: Moon In-dae
- Music by: Jo Yeong-wook
- Production company: Yoo Movie
- Distributed by: Lotte Entertainment
- Release dates: October 5, 2012 (Busan International Film Festival); June 6, 2013 (South Korea)
- Running time: 123 minutes
- Country: South Korea
- Languages: Korean; Thai; English

Mai Ratima (Korean: 마이 라띠마; RR: Mai rattima) is a 2013 South Korean film that portrays the unlikely love affair of a Korean man in his 30s living on the bottom rung of society and a mail-order bride from Thailand in her 20s.

It is actor-director Yoo Ji-tae's first feature film. Yoo emphasizes the discrimination against the ever-increasing number of Southeast Asian women who come to Korea for prearranged marriages, saying he wanted to "portray seemingly insurmountable obstacles facing people who desire to make a difference and beat the odds," and delve into "the pain, desire and deficiency that love bears."

The film won the Jury Prize ("Lotus du Jury") at the 2013 Deauville Asian Film Festival. It was praised by Deauville's jury president, Jérôme Clément for its sensitive handling and Yoo's keen insight as director. Clément said, "It's astonishing that this is his first feature film. This award is presented with the hopes that this film will have a chance to be seen widely by film fans worldwide."

Mai Ratima was released in theaters on June 6, 2013.

== Plot ==
To support her sister and Alzheimer's-afflicted mother back in Thailand, Mai Ratima (Park Ji-soo) enters into an arranged marriage with mentally challenged Sang-pil (Lee Jun-hyuk). Stuck in the drab seaside town of Pohang, she endures the daily harangues of her mother-in-law and sexual harassment by her brother-in-law Sang-rim (Kim Kyung).

Mai's woes are exacerbated when her visa renewal comes up, but she narrowly escapes deportation thanks to the spur-of-the-moment kindness of Soo-young (Bae Soo-bin), a social outcast who can't even afford to renew his national ID. They run off to Seoul and inevitably drift into a relationship, but their happiness doesn't last long as Soo-young becomes entangled with bar hostess Young-jin (So Yoo-jin). The corruption and callousness of the big city leave them bruised and jaded.

== Cast ==
- Bae Soo-bin - Soo-young
- Park Ji-soo - Mai Ratima
- So Yoo-jin - Young-jin
- Go Se-won - Joon
- Kim Kyung - Sang-rim
- Lee Jun-hyeok - Sang-pil
- Hwak Sook-sung
- Dong Hyun-bae as the Company President Jang's party 2
- Choi Deok-moon as Karaoke's owner.

== Production ==
Yoo Ji-tae wrote the synopsis while still at college but it would be another 15 years before the project was finally turned into a movie. Prior to his feature film debut, Yoo proved his potential as a director after having helmed several short films (such as Out of My Intention), which were all highly critically praised.

Initially titled A Boy Dreams of Sansevieria, filming began in Gyeonggi Province on January 26, 2012. It premiered at the 17th Busan International Film Festival on October 5, 2012.

== Awards and nominations ==
Year	Award	Category	Recipient	Result
2013	15th Deauville Asian Film Festival	Jury Prize	Mai Ratima	Won
2013	34th Blue Dragon Film Awards	Best New Actress	Park Ji-soo	Won
2014	19th Chunsa Film Art Awards	Best New Director	Yoo Ji-tae	Nominated
2014	1st Wildflower Film Awards	Best Actress	Park Ji-soo	Nominated
2014	1st Wildflower Film Awards	Best New Actor/Actress	Park Ji-soo	Nominated
2014	50th Baeksang Arts Awards	Best New Actress	Park Ji-soo	Nominated
