= The Russian Novel =

2012 film by Shin Yeon-sik

- Film poster
- Hangul: 러시안 소설
- Hanja: 러시안 小說
- RR: Reosian soseol
- MR: Rŏsian sosŏl
- Directed by: Shin Yeon-shick
- Written by: Shin Yeon-shick
- Produced by: Shin Yeon-shick
- Starring: Kang Shin-hyo; Kyung Sung-hwan; Lee Jae-hye
- Cinematography: Choi Yong-jin
- Edited by: Kim Jung-hoon
- Music by: Kim Shin-il
- Distributed by: KT&G Sangsangmadang
- Release dates: October 5, 2012 (Busan International Film Festival); September 19, 2013 (South Korea)
- Running time: 140 minutes
- Country: South Korea
- Language: Korean
- Budget: ₩30,000,000
- Box office: ₩43,741,400

The Russian Novel (Korean: 러시안 소설) is a 2012 South Korean drama film written and directed by Shin Yeon-shick about an aspiring author who wakes up from a 27-year coma as one of his country's finest authors, credited for a book he didn't write.

It made its world premiere in 2012 at the 17th Busan International Film Festival where Shin won Best Director from the Director's Guild of Korea.

== Plot ==
Shin-hyo is a frustrated writer who dreams of becoming a great author, but being uneducated and lacking in skill, he finds it difficult to succeed. His inspiration comes from the writer, Kim Ki-jin, who he soon learns is the father of one of his friends, Sung-hwan. Shin-hyo manages to convince Sung-hwan and a talented young writer named Kyung-mi to help him arrange a meeting with Kim Ki-jin to show him his work. He falls into a depression when Kim calls his work "trash" which leads to him throwing his manuscripts into the river. They are rescued by the preacher's daughter, Jae-hye. Jae-hye, who is in love with Shin-hyo, re-types the novels as a form of encouragement. Because of a drug overdose, he ends up in a coma. Twenty-seven years later, Shin-hyo wakes from a vegetative state and learns that he has become a literary sensation and is now a well-respected author in South Korea. The book, The Russian Novel, allowed him to achieve his status in the literary world, however, he realizes that it is not his work. Someone has taken his manuscripts, which have been revised, and delivered them to Sung-hwan who got them published. He tries to find out who the culprit is and who wrote the book, especially the famous last words of the story which he didn't write.

== Cast ==
- Kang Shin-hyo as Shin-hyo
- Kyung Sung-hwan as Sung-hwan
- Lee Jae-hye as Jae-hye
- Lee Kyung-mi as Kyung-mi
- Kim Jung-suk as Jung-suk
- Lee Bit-na as Ga-rim
- Choi Jong-ryul as Father's younger brother
- Park Min-jung as Ji-ae
- Lee Yoo-mi as Yoo-mi
- Gil Chang-gyu as middle-aged Seong-gyu
- Yang Seong-gyu as young Seong-gyu
- Lee Hyeon-ho as Soo-young
- Park Sang-ah as Radio announcer
- Kim Sang-mi as young Ji-hyun
- Noh Soo-kyung as Soo-kyung
- Seo Jung-sik as Jung-sik
- Choi Myeong-hyo as Kim Ki-jin
- Jeong Hoon-hee as middle-aged Ji-hyun

== Reception ==
Elizabeth Kerr of The Hollywood Reporter wrote, "There's an interesting film about art and fame buried deep beneath an unwieldy one about an irritating writer." Koreanfilm.org called it "a near-miss" that "could have been a much more powerful cinematic experience." Pierce Conran of Modern Korean Cinema praised it as "one of the 2012's most unique and lush Korean films."

=== Awards and nominations ===
Year	Award	Category	Recipient	Result
2013	14th Jeonju International Film Festival	Moët Rising Star	Shin Yeon-shick	Won
2013	17th Busan International Film Festival	DGK Award for Best Director	Shin Yeon-shick	Won
2013	33rd Korean Association of Film Critics Awards	Best Screenplay	Shin Yeon-shick	Won
2014	1st Wildflower Film Awards	Best Film	The Russian Novel	Nominated
2014	1st Wildflower Film Awards	Best Director	Shin Yeon-shick	Nominated
2014	1st Wildflower Film Awards	Best Actor	Kang Shin-hyo	Nominated
2014	1st Wildflower Film Awards	Best New Actor/Actress	Kang Shin-hyo	Nominated
2014	1st Wildflower Film Awards	Best Cinematography	Choi Yong-jin	Nominated
2014	50th Baeksang Arts Awards	Best New Actress	Lee Jae-hye	Nominated
2014	23rd Buil Film Awards	Best Screenplay	Shin Yeon-shick	Won
