= Dongbaekdongsan Wetland =

Wetland in the Jeju-do province, South Korea

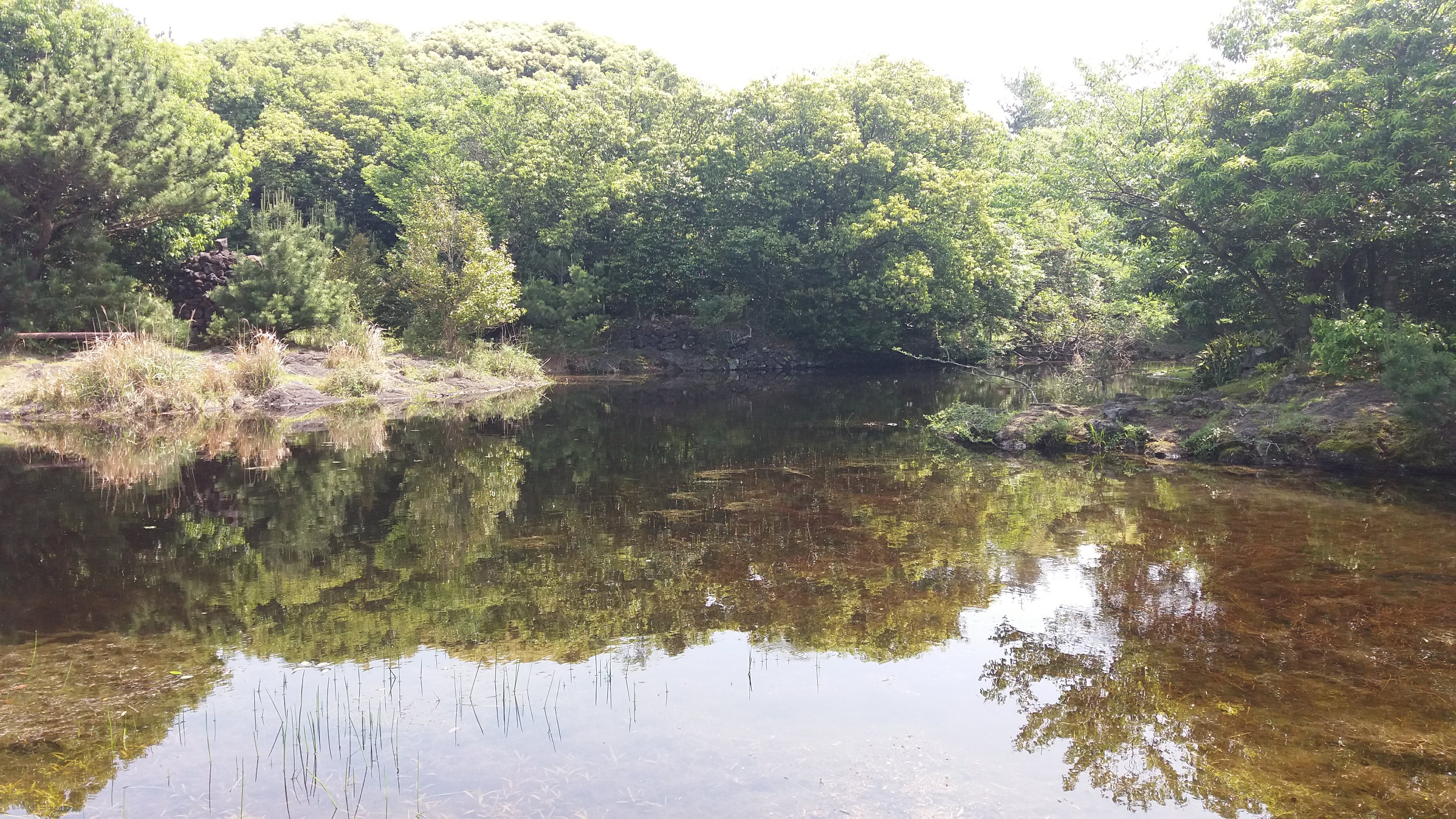

- Location within South Korea
- Location: Jeju-do province, South Korea
- Coordinates: 33.5°N 126.72°E

Ramsar Wetland
- Official name: Dongbaekdongsan
- Designated: 14 March 2011
- Reference no.: 1947

Dongbaekdongsan is located in the unique ‘Gotjawal’ forest in the Jeju-do province, South Korea. The Gotjawal forest in Jeju Island is the only region among the world where the tropical northern limit plants and polar southern limit plants coexist. Also, 'Gotjawal' has abundant groundwater and excellent effects of heat-retaining and rehydration. 'Dongbaek' and 'dongsan' mean 'camellia' and 'hill' respectively in Korean.

== Significance ==
Dongbaekdongsan wetland, located in a Gotjawal forest, shows excellence in preservation of the natural condition of grassland, natural cave, and natural wetland etc. It further reveals its significance since it protects wild life and is the habitat of the national and world's important species. Donbaekdongsan wetland supports the nationally endangered species first level including falco peregrinus. It is also the habitat of ten species that are rated to be the second level endangered species and six species of Korean natural monument such as the mandarin duck (Aix galericulata). Furthermore, it world's endangered species listed in IUCN Red List such as Isoetes sinensis Palmer inhabit in Dongbaekdongsan wetland.

Also, Gotjawal lava which is formed by volcanic activities has high transmissibility and thus takes the role of the Jeju groundwater recharger. The groundwater of Dongbaekdongsan wetland is used as one of the sources of groundwater that supports many in the Jeju Island.

== Conservation movement ==
Since the Dongbaekdongsan wetland is the habitat for many nationally and internationally endangered species, it has been recognized for the importance and value of scientific research in 1981. It was designated as the tenth Juju Island monument and is receiving a reserved protection.

Dongbaekdongsan wetland has been designated additionally as the Ramsar Wetland on March 14, 2011 for continuous preservation and protection.

== Organisms ==
- falco peregrinus
- Isoetes sinensis
- Cheju Salamander (Hyobius quelpartensis)
- Mankyua chejuense
- Mandarin Duck (Aix galericulata)
- Boreal Digging Frog (Kaloula borealis)
- Daphne Kiusiana

== Filming ==
Many of the scenes of Jiseul, a 2013 Sundance Film Festival prize winner, were made in this wetland.
