= Cassiopeia (2022 film) =

2022 South Korean drama film

- Official poster
- Hangul: 카시오페아
- RR: Kasiopea
- MR: K'asiop'ea
- Directed by: Shin Yeon-shick
- Written by: Shin Yeon-shick; Jo Yu-jin
- Produced by: Kim Ji-hyung
- Starring: Ahn Sung-ki; Seo Hyun-jin; Joo Ye-rim
- Cinematography: Byeon Ji-su
- Edited by: Kim Jeong-hun
- Music by: Lee Eun-joo
- Production companies: Ruth E Sonidos; Frame Content; WYSIWYG Studio Co., Ltd.
- Distributed by: Triple Pictures
- Release date: June 1, 2022
- Running time: 102 minutes
- Country: South Korea
- Language: Korean
- Box office: US$160,557

Cassiopeia (Korean: 카시오페아) is a 2022 South Korean drama film, directed by Shin Yeon-shick and starring Ahn Sung-ki, Seo Hyun-jin and Joo Ye-rim. The film is about a daughter who loses her memory due to early onset Alzheimer's, and lives a new life with her father. It was released theatrically on June 1, 2022.

== Synopsis ==
Cassiopeia is the brightest constellation and is located next to the North Star. The W-shaped constellation Cassiopeia circle around North Star in a period of 23 hours and 56 minutes. The North Star is a constellation that usually finds a way (used for navigation), it means the Cassiopeia as its parent constellation floats during the day next to the constellation that finds a way. "Cassiopeia, thus, is an important guide to finding the North Star. When you get lost, you can use Cassiopeia to find the North Star and then use the North Star to determine the direction. The same is true of the meaning of family in the work. Like the North Star, it doesn't tell you the direction of life directly, but like Cassiopeia, it indirectly supports and protects you. It implies that family is always by your side and silently protecting you when you lose your way in life."

Su-jin is a successful lawyer. After her divorce, she is having a perfect life as a lawyer and mother. She is preparing her daughter, Gina, to study in the United States. Her father In-woo lives with them and takes care of her granddaughter. She is suddenly diagnosed with Alzheimer's after a car accident. Her father protects her staying by her side as she starts gradually turning into a young child due to loss of memory and a loving accompaniment begins.

== Cast ==
- Ahn Sung-ki as In-woom, Su-jin's father
- Seo Hyun-jin as Su-jin, a lawyer who lost all her memories due to Alzheimer's disease
- Joo Ye-rim as Gina, Su-jin's daughter

== Production ==
In June, 2021 the cast of the film, tentatively titled as Dementia was confirmed as Ahn Sung-ki and Seo Hyun-jin. The film directed by Shin Yeon-shick was expected to start filming in second half of 2021. With this film Shin Yeon-shick has made a comeback after 2017 film Romans 8:37. Seo Hyun-jin is working in a film after four years, since her last film was Because I Love You in 2017. Principal photography of the film began on September 9, 2021.

== Release and reception ==
The film was released on 175 screens on June 1, 2022, in South Korea.

=== Box office ===
As per Korean Film Council (Kofic) integrated computer network, the film opened at 6th place with 5,344 admissions on the Korean box office.

As of July 14, 2022 it is at the 29th place among all the Korean films released in the year 2022 in South Korea, with gross of US$148,789 and 22,149 admissions.

=== Critical response ===
Kim Na-yeon of Star News reviewing the film praised the performance of the actors Seo Hyun-jin, Ahn Seong-gi and Joo Ye-rim, writing, "thanks to the brilliant performances of the actors." But other than that, Kim didn't find any hold in the film. Kim concluded, "However, it is a pity that there is no particular strength other than the acting of the actors." Lee Yoo-chae of Cine21 described the film as "parenting journal written by a man who has had a chance to make up for his failures as a father." Lee praised the performance of Seo Hyun-jin writing, "actress Seo Hyun-jin shows off her challenging acting in her first movie starring role." Concluding, Lee revealed that for Cassiopeia director Shin Yeon-sik got the idea from the similar relationship between Robert De Niro and Anne Hathaway in The Intern so for the director due to his relationship with Ahn Sung-ki, "Cassiopeia had to be the story of a woman who has her father as Ahn Sung-ki." Park Jin-young reviewing for Joy News 24 wrote about the film, "The movie captures the situation of Alzheimer's patients and their families, as well as their companionship, with a calm gaze without exaggeration or belief." Park praised the performances of Seo Hyun-jin, writing, "Seo Hyun-jin's passionate performance, which solidly depicts various roles and swirling emotions, from lawyers to maternal love to Alzheimer's, draws admiration," and Ahn Sung-ki, writing, "Ahn Sung-ki leads the play stably with a heavy presence and deep eyes."

== Accolades ==
Award	Date of ceremony	Category	Recipient(s)	Result	Ref.
Korean Association of Film Critics Awards	23 November 2022	International Critics League Korea Headquarters Award	Shin Yeon-shick	Won	
