= Wildflower Film Awards =

South Korean annual film awards

- Hangul: 들꽃영화상
- Hanja: 들꽃映畫賞
- RR: Deulkkot yeonghwasang
- MR: Tŭlkkot yŏnghwasang
- Awarded for: Excellence in independent and low-budget films
- Location: Seoul
- Country: South Korea
- Presented by: Wildflower Film Awards Korea
- First award: 2014
- Final award: 2022
- Website: www.wildflower-awards.com

The Wildflower Film Awards (Korean: 들꽃영화상) is an awards ceremony recognizing the achievements of Korean independent and low-budget films. The awards, presented by the Wildflower Film Awards Korea - a grassroots effort by a group of film critics led by founder and organizer Darcy Paquet (with the participation of Oh Dong-jin), aims to create more publicity in Korea and abroad for filmmakers working outside of the mainstream commercial film industry. Awards are handed out annually to films released in the previous year.

In 2016, Best New Actor and Actress categories were merged and a new Best Supporting Performer section was added.

In 2018, a new category for Best Music and Best Producer were added.

In 2020, the Best New Director (Narrative Films) and Best New Director (Documentaries) categories were merged.

== Categories ==
- Grand Prize
- Best Film
- Best Director (Narrative Films)
- Best Director (Documentaries)
- Best Actor
- Best Actress
- Best Screenplay
- Best Cinematography
- Best New Director
- Best New Actor
- Best New Actress
- Special Commendations

== Grand Prize ==
#	Year	Film	Director
1	2014	—N/a	—N/a
2	2015	Han Gong-ju	Lee Su-jin
3	2016	Alive	Park Jung-bum
4	2017	The World of Us	Yoon Ga-eun
5	2018	Bamseom Pirates Seoul Inferno	Jung Yoon-suk
6	2019	The Remnants	Kim Il-ran, Lee Hyuk-sang
7	2020	KIM-GUN	Kang Sang-woo
8	2021	Lucky Chan-sil	Kim Cho-hee
9	2022	Sewing Sisters (Korean: 미싱타는 여자들)	Kim Jeong-young and Lee Hyuk-rae
10	2023	Soup and Ideology (Korean: 수프와 이데올로기)	Yang Yong-hi

== Best Film ==
#	Year	Film	Director
1	2014	(Narrative Films) Jiseul	O Muel
1	2014	(Documentaries) Scenery	Zhang Lu

== Best Director (Narrative Films) ==
#	Year	Director	Film
1	2014	Yeon Sang-ho	The Fake
2	2015	Hong Sang-soo	Hill of Freedom
3	2016	Shin Su-won	Madonna
4	2017	Kim Soo-hyun	Beaten Black and Blue
5	2018	Hong Sang-soo	The Day After
6	2019	Jeon Go-woon	Microhabitat
7	2020	Lee Ok-seop	Maggie
8	2021	Yoon Dan-bi	Moving On
9	2022	Lee Ran-hee	A Leave
10	2023	Choi Equan	Kill Me Now

== Best Director (Documentaries) ==
#	Year	Director	Film
2	2015	Park Chan-kyong	Manshin: Ten Thousand Spirits
3	2016	E Il-ha	A Crybaby Boxing Club
4	2017	Kim Jung-keun	The Island of Shadows
5	2018	Moon Chang-yong, Jeon Jin	Becoming Who I Was
6	2019	Jung Sung-il	Night and Fog in Zona
7	2020	Kangyu Ga-ram	Itaewon
8	2021	Mire Kim	East Asia Anti-Japan Armed Front
9	2022	Lee Seung-jun	Shadow Flowers
10	2023	Oan Kim, Brigitte Bouillot	The Man Who Paints Water Drops

== Best Actor ==
#	Year	Actor	Film
1	2014	Nam Yeon-woo	Fatal
2	2015	Ahn Jae-hong	The King of Jokgu
3	2016	Jung Jae-young	Right Now, Wrong Then
4	2017	Park Jong-hwan	The Boys Who Cried Wolf
5	2018	Gi Ju-bong	Merry Christmas Mr. Mo
6	2019	Sung Yu-bin	Last Child
7	2020	Uhm Tae-goo	My Punch-Drunk Boxer
8	2021	Kwak Min-gyoo	The Boy From Nowhere
9	2022	Kim Tae-hoon	Good Person
10	2023	Lee Joong-ok	Paroho

== Best Actress ==
#	Year	Actress	Film
1	2014	Jung Eun-chae	Nobody's Daughter Haewon
2	2015	Chun Woo-hee	Han Gong-ju
3	2016	Lee Jung-hyun	Alice in Earnestland
4	2017	Jeong Ha-dam	Steel Flower
5	2018	Lee Min-ji	Jane
6	2019	Esom	Microhabitat
7	2020	Park Ji-hu	House of Hummingbird
8	2021	Kim Ho-jung	A French Woman
9	2022	Jeong Ae-hwa	Gull
10	2023	Yang Mal-bok	The Apartment with Two Women

== Best Screenplay ==
#	Year	Screenwriter	Film
2	2015	July Jung	A Girl at My Door
3	2016	Shin Yeon-shick	The Avian Kind
4	2017	Kim Jin-hwang	The Boys Who Cried Wolf
5	2018	Cho Hyun-hoon, Kim So-mi	Jane
6	2019	Shin Dong-seok	Last Child
7	2020	Kim Joong-hyun	February
8	2021	Lee Taegyeom, Kim Ja-en	Dispatch; I don't fire myself
9	2022	Jung Wook	Good Person
10	2023	July Jung	Next Sohee

== Best Cinematography ==
#	Year	Cinematographer	Film
1	2014	Yang Jeong-hoon	Jiseul
2	2015	Kelvin Kyung Kun Park, Stone Kim	A Dream of Iron
3	2016	Fujii Masayuki	A Midsummer's Fantasia
4	2017	Kim Byung-jung	Alone
5	2018	Cho Young-jik	Jane
6	2019	Kim Jong-sun	Beautiful Days
7	2020	Kang Kook-hyun	House of Hummingbird
8	2021	Park Jung-hoon	A French Woman (2019 film)
10	2023	Choo Kyung-yeop	Chorokbam

== Best Music ==
#	Year	Music	Film
5	2018	Flash Flood Darlings	Jane
6	2019	Chung Chae-woong	Eyelids
7	2020	Jang Young-gyu	My Punch-Drunk Boxer

== Best Producer ==
#	Year	Producer	Film
5	2018	An Bo-young	Ash Flower
7	2020	Park Doo-hee	Moonlit Winter

== Best New Director (Narrative Films) ==
#	Year	Director	Film
1	2014	Lee Don-ku	Fatal
2	2015	Lee Yong-seung	10 Minutes
3	2016	Hong Seok-jae	Socialphobia
4	2017	Kim Dae-hwan	End of Winter
5	2018	Lim Dae-hyung	Merry Christmas Mr. Mo
6	2019	Kim Ui-seok	After My Death

== Best New Director (Documentaries) ==
#	Year	Director	Film
3	2016	Gu Ja-hywan	Red Tomb
4	2017	Lee Dong-ha	Weekends
5	2018	Kim Young-jo	Still and All
6	2019	Kim Bo-ram	For Vagina's Sake

== Best New Director (Combined) ==
#	Year	Director	Film
7	2020	Cho Min-jae	Tiny Light
8	2021	Jung Jin-young	Me and Me
9	2022	Kim Mi-jo	Gull
10	2023	Park Jae-beom	Mother Land

== Best New Actor ==
#	Year	Actor	Film
1	2014	Lee Joon	Rough Play
2	2015	Choi Woo-shik	Set Me Free

== Best New Actress ==
#	Year	Actress	Film
2	2015	Kim Soo-an	Mad Sad Bad "Picnic"

== Best New Actor/Actress ==
#	Year	Actor/Actress	Film
3	2016	Kwon So-hyun	Madonna
4	2017	Lee Sang-hee	Our Love Story
5	2018	O Seung-hun	Method
6	2019	Lee Jae-in	Adulthood
7	2020	Cho Min-kyung	February
8	2021	Kang Mal-geum	Lucky Chan-sil
9	2022	Ki Do-young	A Distant Place
10	2023	Kim Hye-yoon	The Girl on a Bulldozer

== Best Supporting Actor/Actress ==
#	Year	Actor/Actress	Film
3	2016	Gil Hae-yeon	In Her Place
4	2017	Choi Moo-sung	Snow Paths
5	2018	Kim Sun-young	Communication & Lies, Happy Bus Day
6	2019	Kim Sae-byuk	Grass
7	2020	Lee Ju-won	February
8	2021	Lee Han-wi	Kukdo Theatre
9	2022	Kim Jae-hwa	Action Hero
10	2023	Lee Joo-shil	Hommage

== Special Commendations ==
#	Year	Category	Recipient	Film
1	2014	Documentary Jury Prize	Jeong Jae-eun	City: Hall
2	2015	Achievement Award	Jung Sang-jin, CEO of Atninefilm	
2	2015	Special Jury Prize	Shin Min-a	Gyeongju
3	2016	Jury Honorable Mention	Jang Hee-sun	My Fair Wedding
3	2016	Special Achievement Award	Gu Yun-hee	Scary House
3	2016	Appreciation Award	Lee Seong-gyou	
4	2017	Special Achievement Award	KwangHwaMoon Cinema	
4	2017	Appreciation Award	Jeon Moo-song	Curtain Call
10	2023	MPA Producer Award	Kim Ji-hyeong	Cassiopeia
10	2023	Special Achievement Award	Ahn Sung-ki	
10	2023	Low-Budget Film Award	Park Kang	Seire
10	2023	Staff Award: Costume Category	Kim Kyung-mi	Missing Yoon
10	2023	Grand Prize for Production Support Contest	Kim Jin-gon	Family in the Sand (Korean: 모래내가족)
10	2023	Excellence Award, Production Support Contest	Yoon Dan-bi	My Birthday Is Not Far (Korean: 내 생일이 멀지 않았어요)
10	2023	Excellence Award, Production Support Contest	Choi Jong-ryong	Water Drop (Korean: 워터드롭)
