= Nam Yeon-woo =

South Korean actor

- Born: October 9, 1982 (age 44); South Korea
- Education: Korea National University of Arts - School of Drama, Acting Department
- Occupation: Actor
- Years active: 2012–present

Korean name
- Hangul: 남연우
- RR: Nam Yeonu
- MR: Nam Yŏnu

Nam Yeon-woo (born October 9, 1982) is a South Korean actor. Nam played his first leading role in a feature film in Lee Don-ku's indie Fatal (2013).

== Filmography ==
| Year | Title | Role | Notes |
|---|---|---|---|
| 2012 | Perfect Number | Investigation team member 2 | |
| 2013 | Fatal | Lee Sung-gong | |
| 2013 | Steal My Heart | Detective Tak | |
| 2013 | 28°C Under the Shade (short film) | Sang-joon | |
| 2013 | Art Lecture (short film) | | |
| 2013 | Daytime Moon (short film) | Bong-gu | |
| 2014 | No Tears for the Dead | Department head Byun's underling 7 | |
| 2014 | Red Carpet | Chang-soo | |
| 2014 | My Dictator | Actor at audition | |
| 2014 | Entangled | Seul-ho, Soon-young's son | |
| 2014 | Intoxicated Heart (short film) | Hwang Seol-won | also credited as director, screenwriter, editor, producer |
| 2015 | The Trip Around the World | Detective Park | |

== Awards and nominations ==
| Year | Award | Category | Nominated work | Result |
|---|---|---|---|---|
| 2014 | 1st Wildflower Film Awards | Best Actor | Fatal | Won |
| 2014 | 1st Wildflower Film Awards | Best New Actor/Actress | Fatal | Nominated |
| 2017 | 38th Blue Dragon Film Awards | Best New Actor | Lost To Shame | Nominated |
