= Shin Yeon-shick =

South Korean film director and screenwriter

- Born: 1976 (age 49–50); Seoul, South Korea
- Occupations: Film director; screenwriter
- Years active: 2002–present
- Agent: Writer of Finecut

Korean name
- Hangul: 신연식
- RR: Sin Yeonsik
- MR: Sin Yŏnsik

Shin Yeon-shick (born 1976) is a South Korean film director and screenwriter. He directed The Fair Love (2010), The Russian Novel (2013), Rough Play (2013), Romans 8:37 (2017), and Cassiopeia (2022), as well as wrote the screenplays for Dongju: The Portrait of a Poet (2016) and Cobweb (2023).

== Career ==
Born in Seoul in 1976, Shin Yeon-shick dropped out of his Spanish Studies major at university to pursue a career in filmmaking. He made his directorial debut in 2003 with Piano Lesson, made on a micro-budget of US$300. In 2005, Shin wrote and directed the black-and-white indie A Great Actor, which had its international premiere at the International Film Festival Rotterdam.

His next film was The Fair Love (2010), a nuanced, lyrical inter-generational romance starring Ahn Sung-ki and Lee Ha-na. But despite its well-known actors and positive reviews, the film was a box office failure with mainstream audiences.

Shin continued making low-budget experimental films. The Russian Novel, an ambitious arthouse drama about a depressed author (played by Kang Shin-hyo) who wakes up from a 27-year coma to find himself a literary sensation for a novel he didn't write, drew even more critical acclaim. The Director's Guild of Korea named Shin as Best Director at the 17th Busan International Film Festival in 2012, and he also won Best Screenplay from the Korean Association of Film Critics Awards and the Buil Film Awards.

In 2013, he directed Rough Play (titled "An Actor Is an Actor" in Korean) from a screenplay by Kim Ki-duk about the dark underbelly of the Korean film industry through a young actor's quick rise and fall, and cast K-pop star Lee Joon in the leading role. Shin was determined to reshape Kim's symbolism-heavy script into a more narrative-driven, commercial film, and during post-production he rewrote and reshot 50% of the film.

This was followed by The Avian Kind, in which a man goes on a road trip to search for his missing wife, and finally finds her 15 years later, only she's transformed into a bird. It made its world premiere at the Jeonju International Film Festival as part of the 2014 Jeonju Digital Project, and received a theatrical release in 2015. Shin then shared screenwriting credit with Kim Sung-ho for How to Steal a Dog (2014).

His upcoming project Like a French Film is an omnibus composed of four short films titled A Time to Leave, A Lady Selling Beer, A Remaining Time and Like a French Film, starring Shin Min-cheol and Kim Dasom.

== Filmography ==
=== Film ===
Year	Film	Credited as			Ref.
Year	Film	Director	Writer	Producer	Ref.
2003	Piano Lesson	Yes	No	No	
2005	A Great Actor	Yes	Yes	Yes	
2007	The Villains (short film)	No	Yes	No	actor
2010	The Fair Love	Yes	Yes	Yes	Investor
2013	The Russian Novel	Yes	Yes	Yes	
2013	Rough Play	Yes	Adaptation	No	Also actor
2014	How to Steal a Dog	No	Yes	No	
2014	The Avian Kind	Yes	Yes	No	Also actor
2016	Like a French Film	Yes	Yes	Yes	
2016	Dongju: The Portrait of a Poet	No	Yes	Yes	
2017	Romans 8:37	Yes	Yes	Yes	Investor
2022	Cassiopeia	Yes	Yes	No	
2022	Men of Plastic	No	Yes	No	
2023	Cobweb	No	Yes	Yes	
2024	One Win	Yes	Yes	Yes	

=== Television ===
Year	Title		Credited as			Ref.
Year	English	Korean	Director	Writer	Producer	Ref.
2024	Uncle Samsik	삼식이 삼촌	Yes	Yes	No	

== Awards and nominations ==
Year	Award	Category	Recipient	Result	Ref.
2013	14th Jeonju International Film Festival	Moët Rising Star	The Russian Novel	Won	
2013	17th Busan International Film Festival	DGK Award for Best Director	The Russian Novel	Won	
2013	33rd Korean Association of Film Critics Awards	Best Screenplay	The Russian Novel	Won	
2014	1st Wildflower Film Awards	Best Film	The Russian Novel	Nominated	
2014	1st Wildflower Film Awards	Best Director	The Russian Novel	Nominated	
2014	23rd Buil Film Awards	Best Screenplay	The Russian Novel	Won	
2016	3rd Wildflower Film Awards	Best Screenplay	The Avian Kind	Won	
2016	52nd Baeksang Arts Awards	Best Screenplay (Film)	Dongju: The Portrait of a Poet	Nominated	
2016	16th Director's Cut Awards	Best Production of the Year	Dongju: The Portrait of a Poet	Won	
2016	25th Buil Film Awards	Best Screenplay	Dongju: The Portrait of a Poet	Won	
2016	36th Korean Association of Film Critics Awards	Best Screenplay	Dongju: The Portrait of a Poet	Won	
2016	17th Busan Film Critics Awards	Best Screenplay	Dongju: The Portrait of a Poet	Won	
2016	37th Blue Dragon Film Awards	Best Screenplay	Dongju: The Portrait of a Poet	Won	
2022	42nd Korean Association of Film Critics Awards	International Critics League Korea Headquarters Award	Cassiopeia	Won	
2023	59th Grand Bell Awards	Best Screenplay	Cobweb	Nominated	
2023	44th Blue Dragon Film Awards	Best Screenplay	Cobweb	Nominated	

== See also ==
- List of Korean film directors
- Cinema of Korea
