= Kang Shin-hyo =

South Korean actor (born 1989)

Kang Shin-Hyo
- Born: August 13, 1989 (age 37); South Korea
- Education: Sejong University – Film Art
- Occupation: Actor
- Years active: 2012–present
- Agent: Ace Factory

Korean name
- Hangul: 강신효
- RR: Gang Sinhyo
- MR: Kang Sinhyo

Kang Shin-Hyo (born August 13, 1989) is a South Korean actor. Kang was studying acting in classes run by director Shin Yeon-Shik, when Shin cast him in the leading role of his independent film, The Russian Novel (2013).

== Filmography ==
=== Films ===
Year	Title	Role
2013	The Russian Novel	Shin-Hyo
2013	Rough Play	Woo Geun
2015	The Avian Kind	Young hunter
2015	Sorry, I Love You, Thank You	Lee Jong-Hyuk
2015	Summer Snow	Actor

=== Television series ===
Year	Title	Role
2013	Iris II: New Generation	Jang Chul
2014	Steal Heart	Kim Nam-soo
2014	You Are the Only One	Nam Hye-sung
2015	Six Flying Dragons	Lee Bang-gan
2017	My Sassy Girl	Wol-myung
2017	Distorted	Kim Jin-woo / Moon Shin-nam
2017	While You Were Sleeping	Student (Special appearance, episode 10)
2017	Oh, the Mysterious	Kwon Dae-woong
2022	Love (ft. Marriage and Divorce) 3	Pan Sa-hyeon
2022	Insider	Hong Jae-sun
2023	Perfect Marriage Revenge	Seo Jong-wook

== Discography ==
=== Soundtrack appearances ===
Title	Year	Album	Ref.
"Don't Worry" (걱정말아요) (with Lee Min-young)	2022	Love (ft. Marriage and Divorce) 3 OST Part 5	

== Musical theatre ==
Year	Title	Role
2013	Wuthering Heights (South Korean adaptation)	Heathcliff

== Awards and nominations ==
Year	Award	Category	Nominated work	Result
2014	1st Wildflower Film Awards	Best Actor	The Russian Novel	Nominated
2014	1st Wildflower Film Awards	Best New Actor/Actress	The Russian Novel	Nominated
2017	25th SBS Drama Awards	Best New Actor	Distorted	Nominated
