= Char... The No-Man's Island =

- Film poster
- Directed by: Sourav Sarangi
- Written by: Sourav Sarangi
- Starring: Rubel Mondal; Sofikul Sheikh
- Cinematography: Sourav Sarangi
- Edited by: Sourav Sarangi
- Release date: 13 December 2012 (Dubai International Film Festival)
- Running time: 97 minutes
- Country: India
- Languages: Bengali, Hindi

Char... The No-Man's Island is a 2012 documentary film directed by Sourav Sarangi. The documentary is a co-production by India, Japan, Norway, Italy and England. The film was shown in the Berlin Film Festival.

== Synopsis ==
The film revolves around Rubel, a young boy who wants to attend school, but whose financial circumstances force him to become a smuggler from India to Bangladesh. Every day, he has to cross a river that forms the border between the two countries. He stays at an island named Char which is a no-man's land and is patrolled by the border security force of both countries.
