= Kim Su-hyeon (actor, born 1970) =

South Korean actor

- Born: February 20, 1970 (age 56); South Korea
- Other name: Kim Soo-hyun
- Education: Chung-Ang University - Theater and Film Studies
- Occupation: Actor
- Years active: 1997–present
- Parent(s): Kim In-tae; Baek Su-ryeon

Korean name
- Hangul: 김수현
- RR: Gim Suhyeon
- MR: Kim Suhyŏn

Kim Su-hyeon (born February 20, 1970) is a South Korean actor. Best known as a supporting actor (notably in films directed by Ryoo Seung-wan), Kim played his first feature film leading role in the indie Sleepless Night (2013).

== Filmography ==
=== Film ===
- Lament (1997)
- The Old Miner's Song (1999)
- The Happy Funeral Director (2000)
- Die Bad (2000)
- Failan (2001)
- Take Care of My Cat (2001)
- No Blood No Tears (2002)
- Oh! LaLa Sisters (2002)
- Saving My Hubby (2002)
- Show Show Show (2003)
- Tube (2003)
- Oldboy (2003)
- Family Picture (short film, 2003)
- Arahan (2004)
- Twentidentity (2004) (segment: "Sutda")
- Crying Fist (2005)
- Heaven's Soldiers (2005)
- If You Were Me 2 (2005) (segment: "Hey, Man~")
- The City of Violence (2006)
- Three Fellas (2006)
- Once Upon a Time (2008)
- Humming (2008)
- Dachimawa Lee (2008)
- Spare (2008)
- Here I Am (short film, 2008)
- Republic of Korea 1% (2010)
- The Unjust (2010)
- Sleepless Night (2013)
- Guardian (2014)
- Futureless Things (2014)
- Set Me Free (2014)
- Innocence (2020)

=== Television ===
- Korean Peninsula (TV Chosun, 2012)
- KBS Drama Special "The Great Dipper" (KBS2, 2012)
- Forest (KBS2, 2020)

== Theater ==
- Le Visiteur (2008)
- Love Is Coming (2010-2011)
- Ogamdo (2010)
- The Murder of President Lee (2010)
- Uncle Vanya (2010)
- My Mother (2011)
- Alone in Love (2011)
- Hedda Gabler (2012)
- Mr. Bird Goes to the Night Market to Buy a Sheep (2012)
- 내일 공연인데 어떡하지! (2013)
- 12 Wells Road (2014)
- 내일도 공연할 수 있을까? (2014)
- The Tale of the Stolen Manpasikjeok (2014)

== Awards and nominations ==
- 2008 Korea Theater Awards: Best New Actor (Le Visiteur)
- 2008 Dong-A Theatre Awards: Best New Actor (Le Visiteur)
- 2008 Heeseo Theater Awards: Most Promising Newcomer (Le Visiteur)
- 2014 Wildflower Film Awards: Nominated, Best Actor (Sleepless Night)
