= Rough Play =

- Film poster
- Hangul: 배우는 배우다
- Hanja: 俳優는 俳優다
- RR: Baeuneun baeuda
- MR: Paeunŭn paeuda
- Directed by: Shin Yeon-shick
- Written by: Kim Ki-duk
- Produced by: Kim Ki-duk; Shin Yeon-shick
- Starring: Lee Joon
- Cinematography: Choi Yong-jin
- Edited by: Kim Jung-hoon
- Music by: Gu Bon-woong
- Distributed by: Next Entertainment World
- Release dates: October 4, 2013 (Busan International Film Festival); October 24, 2013 (South Korea)
- Running time: 113 minutes
- Country: South Korea
- Language: Korean
- Box office: US$592,021

Rough Play (Korean: 배우는 배우다; lit. 'An Actor Is an Actor') is a 2013 South Korean drama film about an actor (played by Lee Joon) who becomes a superstar overnight then hits rock bottom. It is written and executive produced by Kim Ki-duk, and directed by Shin Yeon-shick. It screened at the 18th Busan International Film Festival, and was released in theaters on October 24, 2013.

== Plot ==
Oh Young (Lee Joon) is an intense young actor, full of vigor for his chosen field. He currently performs regularly for a small theater company as well as playing minor roles in movies. A manager named Kim Jang-Ho (Seo Bum-Suk) then spots Oh Young on the filming set of a movie. He sees potential in Oh Young and offers to make him a top actor. After signing his contract, Oh Young's role in the movie is rewritten into a major supporting character. Once the movie is released, Oh Young receives praise for his performance and also becomes a burgeoning celebrity. As his popularity rises, Oh Young's life quickly spirals out of control.

== Cast ==
- Lee Joon – Oh Young
- Seo Young-hee – Oh Yeon-hee
- Kang Shin-hyo – Woo Geun
- Kyung Sung-hwan – Department head Kim
- Min Ji-woo – Hong Ji-min
- Seo Beom-seok – Kim Jang-ho
- Lee Hwa-shi – Rich madam
- Sung Hong-il – Representative Kang
- Kim In-soo – Director of Rice Cake Hat
- Kim Jung-seok – Director of Moebius
- Lee Hyun-ho – Assistant director of Moebius
- Kim So-yeon – Moebius actress
- Lee Sae-byul – Schoolgirl
- Gi Ju-bong – Theater director
- Oh Kwang-rok – Jo Kang-ho
- Ma Dong-seok – "Tenacious" gang boss
- Yang Dong-geun – Kang Bin
- Kim Hyung-jun – Rookie
- Ahn Sung-ki – Jeonju festival VIP
- Lee Choon-yeon – Jeonju festival VIP
- Ryoo Seung-wan – Jeonju festival VIP
- Kim Kkot-bi – Jeonju festival VIP
- Lee Bit-na – Advertisement Girl

== Awards and nominations ==
Year	Award	Category	Recipient	Result	Ref.
2014	1st Wildflower Film Awards	Best Actor	Lee Joon	Nominated	
2014	1st Wildflower Film Awards	Best New Actor/Actress	Lee Joon	Won	
2014	50th Baeksang Arts Awards	Best New Actor	Lee Joon	Nominated	
2014	23rd Buil Film Awards	Best New Actor	Lee Joon	Nominated	
2014	Fantasporto	Best Film	Rough Play	Nominated	
2014	Fantasporto	Orient Express Section Grand Prize	Rough Play	Nominated	
