= Steal My Heart (film) =

- Poster
- Directed by: Lee Hyeon-jong
- Written by: Lee Hyeon-jong
- Produced by: Sim Jung-woon; Yoon Il-joong; Jo Su-min; Bae Yong-guk
- Starring: Kim Ah-joong; Joo Won
- Edited by: Kim Hyeong-ju
- Production companies: So-net Entertainment; Sim Entertainment
- Distributed by: Lotte Entertainment
- Release date: December 18, 2013
- Running time: 115 minutes
- Country: South Korea
- Language: Korean

Steal My Heart (Korean: 캐치미; RR: Kaechimi; lit. 'Catch Me') is a 2013 South Korean romantic comedy film written and directed by Lee Hyeon-jong, starring Kim Ah-joong and Joo Won.

== Plot ==
Lee Ho-tae is a police profiler who has a 100 percent success rate in tracking down suspects. One day while he's on a stakeout, the criminal attempts to flee and gets run over in a hit and run accident. When Ho-tae follows the driver to make an arrest, he finds himself face to face with Yoon Jin-sook, the first girl he ever loved. Their relationship had ended ten years ago. Taken aback, Ho-tae stalls his fellow officers by locking up Jin-sook in his own home, but as old feelings resurface, he finds out more shocking truths about his ex-girlfriend, like the fact that she's a notorious thief who's long been on the most wanted list for stealing priceless artworks and gems across Seoul. Together, they try to come up with a solution to keep Jin-sook out of prison while the rest of the police force searches for her.

== Cast ==
- Kim Ah-joong as Yoon Jin-sook/Lee Sook-ja
- Joo Won as Lee Ho-tae
- Joo Jin-mo as Chief detective
- Baek Do-bin as Oh Kyeong-wi
- Bae Sung-woo as Sergeant Park
- Hwang Tae-kwang as Detective Lee
- Kim Min-sung as Detective Jo
- Kang Min-jung as Detective Na
- Park Young-woong as Detective Bong
- Ji Sang-min as Detective Ji
- Nam Yeon-woo as Detective Tak
- Kang Deok-joong as Detective Choi
- Kim Hee-won as Auctioneer
- Sa Hee as Joo-ri
- Shin Seung-hwan as Bar part-timer
- Kim Mi-ra as Diamond Lady Kim
- Lee Sang-hoon as Guard
- Cha Tae-hyun as Guy next door (cameo)
- Park Chul-min as Fence (cameo)
- Joo Suk-tae as Jin Sook's older brother
- Cha Chung-hwa as Human rights organization representative
