= O Muel =

South Korean filmmaker (born 1971)

- Born: Oh Kyung-heon; 1971 (age 54–55); Jeju Province, South Korea
- Education: Jeju National University
- Occupations: Film director, screenwriter
- Years active: 2003-present

Korean name
- Hangul: 오경헌
- RR: O Gyeongheon
- MR: O Kyŏnghŏn

Professional name
- Hangul: 오멸
- RR: O Myeol
- MR: O Myŏl

O Muel (born Oh Kyung-heon in 1971) is a South Korean film director and screenwriter. He wrote and directed the award-winning film Jiseul in 2012.

== Career ==
O Muel was born and raised on Jeju Island, and studied Korean painting at Jeju National University. In 1998, he became the director of the Jeju-based culture collective Terror J and organized an annual street art festival called Flower for a Head. O is also the co-director of the Jeju Independent Film Society and acts as artistic director of the theater troupe Japari Research Center.

As a film director, O chose his native Jeju as the setting for all his films, focusing on the island's unique lifestyle, nature and people. He began his filmmaking career with two short films in 2003, Putting on Lipstick Thickly and Flower for a Head. In 2009, O made his feature directorial debut with Nostalgia, which follows a pair of middle-aged amateur musicians who beg a once-promising rocker to be their mentor, as the latter deals with his mother's death. This was followed by Pong Ddol (2010) about the humorous travails of a first-time filmmaker and whose title refers to the stone and metal objects attached to the end of a fishing rod, and Wind of Island (2011) about a young mother forced to abandon her only child. Nostalgia and Pong Ddol received a theatrical release in 2011.

It was his fourth feature film, Jiseul (meaning "potato"), that brought O both domestic and international critical acclaim. Based on a tragic but largely forgotten historical event set during the Jeju uprising in April 1948, O cast non-professional local actors speaking in their native Jeju dialect to play a group of villagers who hid in a cave for 60 days, suffering cold and starvation, to escape from soldiers under shoot-to-kill orders. Shot entirely in black-and-white, the film had a small budget of ₩210 million (US$190,000), part of which was raised through crowdfunding. It premiered at the 17th Busan International Film Festival in 2012, where it received four prizes: Best Director from the Director's Guild of Korea, the Citizen Reviewers' Award, the CGV Movie Collage Award, and the NETPAC Jury Award. The NETPAC jury praised it "for focusing on a dramatic historical event in an understated way, with stunning B/W cinematography, depicting the pathos and the psyche of the victims as well as the aggressors." Jiseul won the World Cinema Grand Jury Prize: Dramatic at the 2013 Sundance Film Festival, the first Korean movie to win that prestigious award. It also won the Cyclo d'Or at the 19th Vesoul International Film Festival of Asian Cinema and Best Film at the 1st Wildflower Film Awards. Jiseul was released in South Korean theaters in 2013, and through positive word of mouth after the Sundance win, it became the best-selling Korean indie drama film with 144,602 admissions, as well as the most successful Korean film to be released on less than 100 screens (this record was later broken by Han Gong-ju).

O's fifth feature film Golden Chariot in the Sky (2014) revolved around three brothers who go on a road trip together, with the youngest dreaming of starting a band called "Golden Chariot" with his village friends (played by real-life nine-member ska band Kingston Rudieska). It made its world premiere at the 49th Karlovy Vary International Film Festival and was the opening film of the 10th Jecheon International Music & Film Festival.

O has started pre-production on his next film The Legend of a Mermaid, where a haenyeo (Jeju-based woman diver) meets a former national synchronized swimmer (played by Moon Hee-kyung and Jeon Hye-bin, respectively). It received a US$10,000 cash grant from the Asian Cinema Fund in 2014.

== Filmography ==
- Putting on Lipstick Thickly (short film, 2003) - director
- Flower for a Head (short film, 2003) - director
- Nostalgia (2009) - director, screenwriter
- Pong Ddol (2010) - director, screenwriter, editor
- Wind of Island (2011) - director
- Jiseul (2012) - director, screenwriter
- Golden Chariot in the Sky (2014) - director, screenwriter
- Eyelids (2015) - director, screenwriter, editor, executive producer
- Mermaid Unlimited (2017) - director

== Awards ==
- 2012 17th Busan International Film Festival: DGK Award for Best Director (Jiseul)
- 2013 22nd Buil Film Awards: Yu Hyun-mok Film Arts Award (Jiseul)
