= Lee Don-ku (director) =

South Korean film director (born 1984)

- Born: February 10, 1984 (age 42); Gongju, South Korea
- Education: Dong-ah Institute of Media and Arts - Theater
- Occupations: Film director; screenwriter
- Years active: 2001–present

Korean name
- Hangul: 이돈구
- Hanja: 李敦求
- RR: I Dongu
- MR: I Ton'gu

Lee Don-ku (Korean: 이돈구; born February 10, 1984) is a South Korean film director, screenwriter and actor. He wrote and directed Fatal (2013) and Entangled (2014).

== Career ==
Lee Don-ku, then a high school student, made his acting debut in 2001 in the leading role of Cheol-min in hip-hop dance movie Turn It Up. He majored in Theater at Dong-ah Institute of Media and Arts, and after college, gained further acting experience in Seoul's Daehangno theater district by starring in stage plays such as Hohwanmama and Grandfather's Case.

But when Lee's graduation short film I Solve Everything Whatever (also known as We Will Do Your Favor) won the Audience Award at the Indie Boom Online Independent Film Festival in 2006, he switched his focus to directing. He subsequently directed the shorts Life of Dog and Help (both in 2009), while working for Cube Entertainment as head of their media division.

To finance his feature directorial debut, Lee then worked as a bathhouse attendant and handed out flyers on street corners, thereby raising the micro-budget of US$3,000. He cast his close friend Nam Yeon-woo as a 28-year-old man who is haunted by his complicity in a teenage girl's gang rape a decade ago, then re-encounters her (played by Yang Jo-ah) at a local church. After two years in development, Lee's Fatal (titled Thorny Flower in Korean) premiered at the 17th Busan International Film Festival in 2012 and was released in theaters in 2013. A romantic drama and psychological thriller that explores guilt and forgiveness, Fatal drew domestic and international critical acclaim.

His second feature "Entangled" followed in 2014. Starring Kim Young-ae, Do Ji-won, Song Il-gook and Kim So-eun, Entangled is a portrait of a family in the aftermath of the tragic, accidental death of a newborn baby at the hands of the Alzheimer's-afflicted matriarch.

== Filmography ==
- Turn It Up (2001) - actor
- I Solve Everything Whatever (short film, 2006) - director, screenwriter
- Life of Dog (short film, 2009) - director, screenwriter
- Help (short film, 2009) - director, screenwriter
- Fatal (2013) - director, screenwriter, editor
- Entangled (2014) - director, screenwriter
- Fanfate (2020) - director, screenwriter
- When Spring Comes (2022) - director, screenwriter

== Awards ==
- 2014 1st Wildflower Film Awards: Best New Director (Fatal)
