= Jeong Jae-eun =

South Korean film director (born 1969)

- Born: 1969 (age 56–57); Seoul, South Korea
- Occupation: Film Director

Korean name
- Hangul: 정재은
- RR: Jeong Jaeeun
- MR: Chŏng Chaeŭn

Jeong Jae-eun (Korean: 정재은; born March 26, 1969) is a South Korean film director.

== Career ==
Jeong Jae-eun attended and was one of the first graduates of the School of Film, TV and Multimedia of the Korea National University of Arts.

Early in her career she wrote and directed several short films, notably Yu-jin's Secret Codes which won the Grand Prix at the KNUA Graduation Film Festival and the Women's Film Festival in Seoul in 1999.

Jeong's first feature film was Take Care of My Cat (2001), a story of friendship and growth among five young women in their twenties. It swept numerous awards at international film festivals, including the NETPAC Award and New Currents Award Special Mention at the Pusan International Film Festival, the FIPRESCI Prize at the Hong Kong International Film Festival, a KNF Award Special Mention at the International Film Festival Rotterdam, and the Best Picture award ("Golden Moon of Valencia") at the Cinema Jove Valencia International Film Festival, among others. Jeong also won Best New Director at the 2002 Korean Film Awards.

In 2003 Jeong made a short titled The Man with an Affair which was included in If You Were Me, an omnibus project for human rights. Her second feature was The Aggressives (2005), a film about urban Seoulite youngsters passionate about inline skating, which was also invited to the Generation section of the Berlinale.

She was an adjunct professor at Sungkyunkwan University's School of Film, Television and Multimedia from 2007 to 2009.

Another short Hakim & Barchin, commissioned by the Ministry of Culture, Sports and Tourism in 2010, followed.

In 2009, Jeong pursued a new interest in documentary filmmaking, centering on urban, environmental, and architectural themes. Talking Architect (2012), about the last few years of celebrated maverick Korean architect Chung Guyon (1943-2011) was her first feature-length documentary. For independent documentaries of this type, a box office score of 10,000 admissions is usually considered to be a major success. However Talking Architect rode positive word-of-mouth to sell a total of 36,500 tickets since its March 8 release. Jeong next shot a second architecture-themed documentary, City: Hall (2013), an in-depth look at the creative, political and bureaucratic pressures that affected the controversial design and renovation of Seoul's new City Hall.

== Filmography ==
- Cats' Apartment (고양이들의 아파트) (2020, documentary)
- Ecology in Concrete (아파트 생태계) (2017, documentary)
- Butterfly Sleep (나비잠) (2017)
- City: Hall (말하는 건축, 시티:홀) (2013, documentary)
- Give Me Back My Cat (고양이를 돌려줘) (2012, short)
- Talking Architect (말하는 건축가) (2012, documentary)
- Hakim & Barchin (하킴과 바르친) (2010, short)
- The Aggressives (태풍태양) (2005)
- If You Were Me (Segment: The Man with an Affair) (여섯 개의 시선) (2003, short)
- Take Care of My Cat (고양이를 부탁해) (2001)
- Girl's Night Out (둘의 밤) (1999, short)
- Yu-jin's Secret Code (도형일기) (1999, short)
- Isang Yun, Adiago (1998, short)
- Women Smoking on the Street (1997, short)
- For Rose (1997, short)
- Seventeen (1996, short)
- After School (방과후) (1996, short)
- I-volla Virus (1995, short)
- Coming-of-Age Ceremony (성인식) (1995, short)

== Awards and accolades ==
2001 Chunsa Film Art Awards

- Special Jury Prize - Jeong Jae-eun

2001 Director's Cut Awards

- Best New Director - Jeong Jae-eun

2002 Korean Film Awards

- Best New Director - Jeong Jae-eun

=== Accolades ===
In 2021 she was selected as Jury member for New Currents Award in 26th Busan International Film Festival to be held in October.

== See also ==
- List of Korean film directors
- Cinema of Korea
