= Mahbub Alam Pollab =

South Korean actor (born 1978)

Mahbub Lee
- মাহবুব আলম
- Born: Mahbub Alam; 17 February 1978 (age 48); Bangladesh
- Other name: Mahbub Lee
- Education: Government Tolaram College
- Occupations: Actor; film director; film distributor
- Years active: 2004–present
- Known for: Bandhobi M&M International

Mahbub Alam (Bengali: মাহবুব আলম), is a Bangladeshi-born South Korean actor and film director. He acted in several films in South Korea. He became a South Korean citizen in 2011.

== Acting career ==
Mahbub Alam migrated from Bangladesh to South Korea in 1999 as a migrant worker. From 2002 He started making documentary on life of migrant workers. In 2005 Alam worked in a Korean short film called "Dream of Revenge". In 2009 he made his debut as a lead actor in film named "Where is Ronny" In that same year he acted in a Korean Indie film named "Bandhobi" opposite of Baek Jin-hee. He played a role of Bangladeshi migrant worker named Karim. It received several awards including Best Film Award in 31st Festival of three Continents. He has also worked on several TV shows and advertisements.

== Filmography ==
- Where is Ronny...
- Bandhobi (2009)
- City of Crane
- Love in Korea (Documentary)
- Black Gull
- Son of a Man
- Chinese Winter
- My Friend and His Wife
- Pained
- You Are My Vampire
- Cheo Yong
- Perfect Proposal
- Asura: The City of Madness

== Awards and honours ==
Mahbub Alam received several awards, including the president award of South Korea in 2012.

== Popularity in Bangladesh ==
The Daily Prothom Alo first published an article about Alam's film "Bandhobi" in 2009. In 2014 he appeared in popular Bengali magazine show Ityadi.

== See also ==
- Bandhobi
- Baek Jin-hee
- Shin Dong-il
