= Ki-hoon =

- Hangul: 기훈
- RR: Gihun
- MR: Kihun

Ki-hoon (Korean: 기훈) is a Korean masculine given name. As of 2026, the name ranked 632nd out of 36,179 male names. A total of 657 people, all of whom were male, were born with the name from 2008 to 2026.

Notable people with the name include:

- Woo Ki-hoon, South Korean actor
- Yeom Ki-hun, South Korean football manager and former player
- Kim Ki-hoon, South Korean retired short-track speed skater
- Kim Kih-hoon, South Korean film director and screenwriter.
- Kim Ki-hoon (athlete), retired South Korean javelin thrower

Fictional characters include:

- Seong Gi-hun, also known as Player 456, portrayed by Lee Jung-jae, the protagonist of Squid Game
- Park Ki-hoon, portrayed by Song Sae-byeok, a male supporting character from My Mister

== See also ==
- List of Korean given names
