= Han Ye-ri =

South Korean actress (born 1984)

Yeri Han
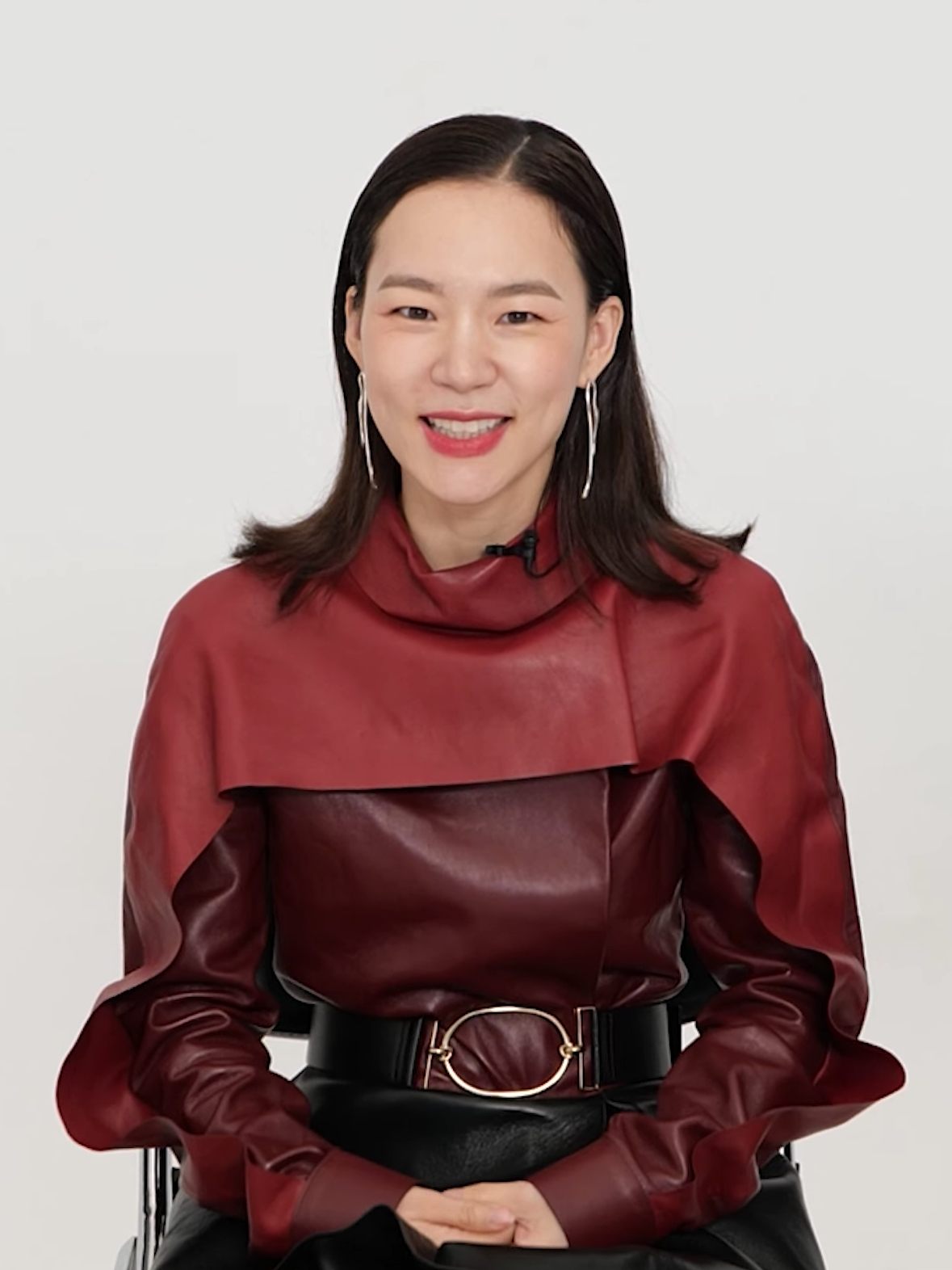
- Han in 2021
- Born: Kim Ye-ri; December 23, 1984 (age 41); Jecheon, South Korea
- Education: Korea National University of Arts (Traditional Dance)
- Occupations: Actress; DJ
- Years active: 2007–present
- Agent(s): Saram Entertainment (Korea); Echo Lake Entertainment (United States)
- Spouse: Unknown (m. 2022)

Korean name
- Hangul: 김예리
- RR: Gim Yeri
- MR: Kim Yeri

Stage name
- Hangul: 한예리
- RR: Han Yeri
- MR: Han Yeri

Kim Ye-ri (Korean: 김예리; born December 23, 1984), known professionally as Han Ye-ri (한예리), is a South Korean actress.

== Career ==
Han built her filmography by starring in short films and indies. She drew notice in the sports drama As One (2012), for which she learned the Hamgyŏng dialect in her role as real-life North Korean table tennis athlete Yu Sun-bok.

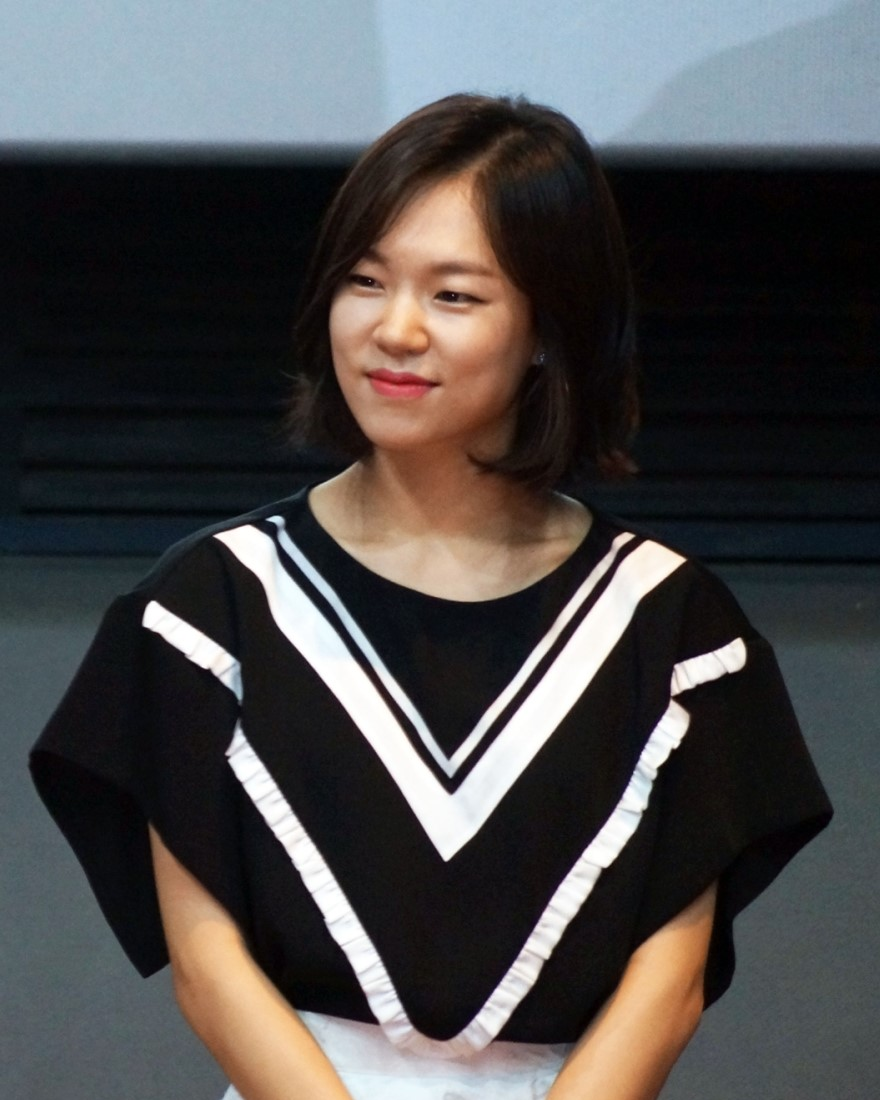
Han in August 2014

She played her first mainstream leading roles in the action thrillers Commitment (2013) and Haemoo (2014), and romantic film A Dramatic Night (2015). Han also starred in the critically acclaimed indie Worst Woman (2016) by Kim Jong-kwan. Han extended her filmography to television, starring in sageuk Six Flying Dragons (2015–2016) and youth comedy Hello, My Twenties! (2016–2017).

In 2021, Han's Hollywood debut, Minari, was nominated for six categories at the 93rd Academy Awards including Best Picture, Best Director, Music, Best Original Screenplay, Best Supporting Actress and Best Actor.

In April 2021, Han signed with USA agency Echo Lake Entertainment, and Han confirmed her attendance at the 2021 Academy Awards.

== Personal life ==
On June 9, 2022, the agency confirmed that Han married her non-celebrity boyfriend in early 2022.

== Filmography ==
=== Film ===
Year	Title	Role	Notes	Ref.
2006	Passionate Sonata		Short film	
2007	Giraffe & Africa	Ye-rin	Short film	
2007	Resurrection of the Butterfly	Young Kwan	Also credited as choreographer	
2008	Blooming in Spring		Short film	
2009	One Step More to the Sea	Won-woo		
2009	Let the Blue River Run	Sook-yi		
2009	Paju	Mi-ae		
2009	A Blind River	So-yeon		
2009	Be with Me	Cha-kyung	Short film	
2009	A Trip to the Moon		Short film	
2010	One Night Stand			
2010	Read My Lips			
2010	Ghost (Be with Me)	Ran	Omnibus film (segment "Tarot 3: The Unseen/Hands That Call")	
2010	Bang!	Girl	Short film	
2010	Anyang, Paradise City			
2011	Nice Shorts! 2011		Omnibus film (segment "Hundred Years of Abduction")	
2011	Anyang, Paradise City	Staff #1		
2011	49th Day	Little daughter	Short film	
2011	The Physics Class		Short film	
2011	Adventure	Seo-young		
2011	Ordinary Days	Hyo-ri	Omnibus film (segment "AMONG")	
2012	As One	Yu Sun-bok		
2013	South Bound	Choi Min-joo		
2013	Dear Dolphin	Cha-kyung		
2013	Big Good		Also credited as assistant director	
2013	The Spy: Undercover Operation	Baek Seol-hee		
2013	Commitment	Hye-in		
2014	Kundo: Age of the Rampant	Gok-ji		
2014	Haemoo	Hong-mae		
2014	Phantoms of the Archive		Omnibus film (segment "A Hat's Journey")	
2015	Love Guide for Dumpees	Jung Si-hoo		
2015	Love and...	Granddaughter		
2016	Worst Woman	Eun-hee		
2016	The Hunt	Kim Yang-Soon		
2016	A Quiet Dream	Ye-ri		
2017	The Table	Eun-hee		
2018	Illang: The Wolf Brigade	Goo Mi-kyeong		
2018	Champion	Soo-jin		
2018	Ode to the Goose	Chemist	Special appearance	
2020	Secret Zoo	Min Chae-ryung	Special appearance	
2020	Minari	Monica Yi	American film	
2022	Hommage	Narrator	barrier-free version	
2024	Spring Night	Yeong Gyeong		

=== Television series ===
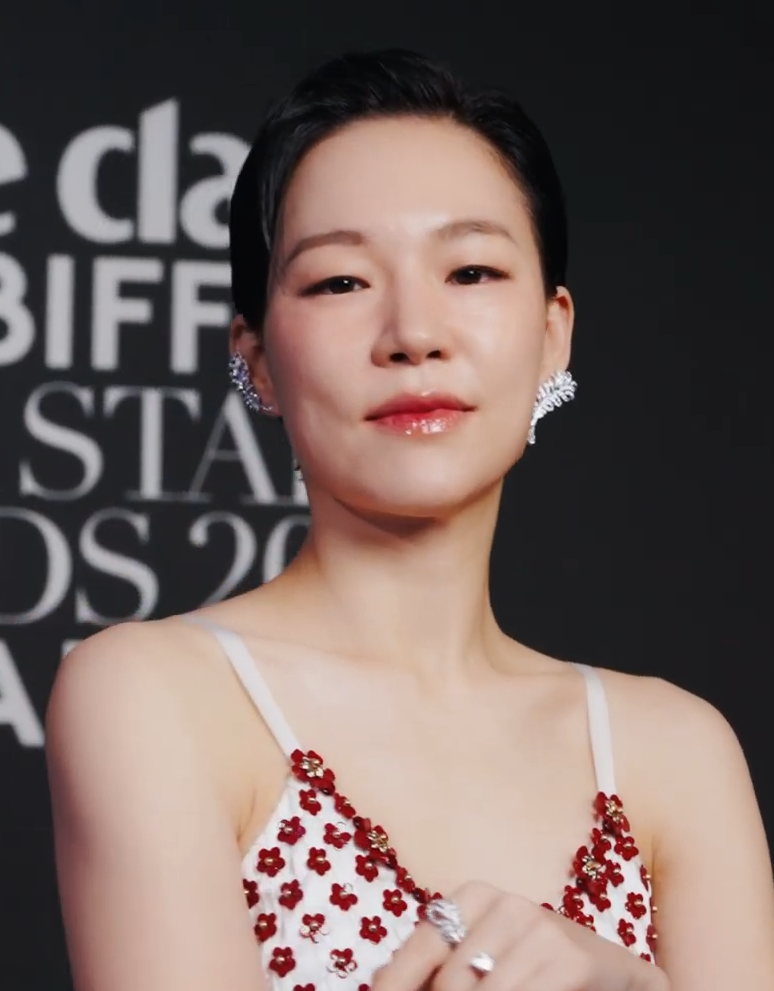
Han at the 2025 Marie Claire Korea Asia Star Awards

Year	Title	Role	Notes	Ref.
2010	Road No. 1	Jo In-sook		
2013	KBS Drama Special: "Yeon-woo's Summer"	Lee Yeon-woo	one act-drama	
2015	Imaginary Cat	Bok-gil	(voice)	
2015–2016	Six Flying Dragons	Yoon-rang / Cheok Sa Gwang		
2016–2017	Hello, My Twenties!	Yoon Jin-myung	Season 1–2	
2018	Switch	Oh Ha-ra		
2019	Nokdu Flower	Song Ja-in		
2020	My Unfamiliar Family	Kim Eun-hee		
2021	Doom at Your Service	Patient	Cameo (episode 3,6)	
2021	Hometown	Jo Jung-hyun		
2024	Doubt	Lee Eo-jin		

=== Web series ===
Year	Title	Role	Notes	Ref.
2019	Love Alarm	DJ Radio	Cameo (episode 5); Season 2	
2023	One Day Off	Kim Yeon-joo	Cameo	

=== Music video appearances ===
Year	Title	Role	Notes	Ref.
2024	김윤아 Kim Yuna - 장밋빛 인생 "La Vie Rosée" Official M/V	Dancer	3 mag 2024 on YouTube	

=== Radio shows ===
Year	Title	Role	Notes	Ref.
2018–2019	Han Ye-ri FM movie music	DJ	June 18, 2018 – January 31, 2019	

== Discography ==
=== Soundtrack appearances ===
Title	Year	Album
"Rain Song"	2020	Minari Original Motion Picture Soundtrack
"Wind Song"	2020	Minari Original Motion Picture Soundtrack

== Accolades ==
=== Awards and nominations ===
Name of the award ceremony, year presented, category, nominee of the award, and the result of the nomination
Award ceremony	Year	Category	Nominee / Work	Result	Ref.
Asian Film Awards	2015	Best Supporting Actress	Haemoo	Nominated	
Baeksang Arts Awards	2013	Best New Actress – Film	As One	Won	
Baeksang Arts Awards	2015	Best Supporting Actress – Film	Haemoo	Nominated	
Baeksang Arts Awards	2017	Best Actress – Film	Worst Woman	Nominated	
Baeksang Arts Awards	2026	Best Actress – Film	Spring Night	Nominated	
Blue Dragon Film Awards	2012	Best New Actress	As One	Nominated	
Blue Dragon Film Awards	2014	Best Supporting Actress	Haemoo	Nominated	
Blue Dragon Film Awards	2016	Best Leading Actress	Worst Woman	Nominated	
Buil Film Awards	2015	Best Supporting Actress	Haemoo	Nominated	
Buil Film Awards	2025	Best Actress	Spring Night	Nominated	
Busan Film Critics Awards	2017	Best Actress	A Quiet Dream	Won	
BIFF with Marie Claire Asia Star Awards	2016	Rising Star Award	Han Ye-ri	Won	
BIFF with Marie Claire Asia Star Awards	2022	Marie Claire Award	Han Ye-ri	Won	
Chunsa Film Art Awards	2015	Best Supporting Actress	Haemoo	Nominated	
Grand Bell Awards	2014	Best Supporting Actress	Haemoo	Nominated	
Independent Spirit Awards	2021	Best Supporting Female	Minari	Nominated	
Indiana Film Journalists Association	2020	Best Actress	Minari	Nominated	
Jeonju IFF, Moet Rising Star Award	2016	Rising Star	Han Ye-ri	Won	
KBS Drama Awards	2013	Best Actress in a One-Act Drama/Special	Yeon-woo's Summer	Won	
KOFRA Film Awards	2013	Discovery of the year	As One	Nominated	
KOFRA Film Awards	2013	Best Supporting Actress	As One	Nominated	
KOFRA Film Awards	2013	Best New Actress	As One	Nominated	
Max Movie Awards	2015	Best Supporting Actress	Haemoo	Nominated	
Mise-en-scène Short Film Festival	2008	Special Jury Prize for Acting	Giraffe & Africa	Won	
Mise-en-scène Short Film Festival	2010	Special Jury Prize for Acting	Be with Me	Won	
New York Film Critics Online	2021	Best Lead Actress	Minari	Nominated	
SBS Drama Awards	2018	Top Excellence Award, Actress in a Wednesday-Thursday Drama	Switch	Nominated	
SBS Drama Awards	2019	Excellence Award, Actress in a Mid-length Drama	Nokdu Flower	Won	
Screen Actors Guild Awards	2021	Outstanding Performance by a Cast in a Motion Picture	Minari	Nominated	
Shinfilm Art Film Festival	2017	Actress in a commercial film	Han Ye-ri	Won	
University Film Festival of Korea	2017	Best Actress	Worst Woman	Won	
Wildflower Film Awards	2017	Best Actress	Worst Woman	Nominated	
Wildflower Film Awards	2026	Best Actress	Spring Night	Won	
Women in Film Korea Festival	2025	Best Actress	Spring Night	Won	

=== State honors ===
Name of country, year given, and name of honor
Country	Year	Honor	Ref.
South Korea (Note: Honors are given at the Korean Popular Culture and Arts Awards, arranged by the Korea Creative Content Agency and hosted by the Ministry of Culture, Sports and Tourism. They are awarded to those who have contributed to the arts and South Korea's pop culture.)	2021	Prime Minister's Commendation	

=== Listicles ===
Name of publisher, year listed, name of listicle, and placement
Publisher	Year	Listicle	Placement	Ref.
Korean Film Council	2021	Korean Actors 200 (Note: Introduces 200 actors that best represent the present and future of Korean cinema to the people in the film industry all over the world.)	Included	
