= Worst Woman =

2016 South Korean romantic melodrama film by Kim Tae-Hun

- Poster
- Directed by: Kim Jong-kwan
- Written by: Kim Jong-kwan
- Produced by: Kim Tae-hun; Sally Lee
- Starring: Han Ye-ri; Ryo Iwase; Lee Hee-joon; Kwon Yul
- Cinematography: Lee Seung-hun
- Edited by: Won Chang-jae
- Music by: Narae
- Production company: Indiestory Inc.
- Release date: August 25, 2016
- Running time: 93 minutes
- Country: South Korea
- Language: Korean
- Box office: US$568,293

Worst Woman (Korean: 최악의 하루; RR: Choeagui haru; lit. 'Worst Day') is a 2016 South Korean romantic melodrama film starring Han Ye-ri, Ryo Iwase, Lee Hee-joon and Kwon Yul. A feature debut by Kim Jong-kwan, it depicts the romantic encounters of a young woman and three different men she meets in a day. It made its debut at the 17th Jeonju International Film Festival and received the FIRESCI Award at the 38th Moscow International Film Festival in 2016.

== Plot ==
Eun-hee (Han Ye-ri) is an actress with poor acting skills. However, in real life, she likes to create different personas each time she meets a different man. Eventually all her lies get tangled up when she happens to meet three men in one day.

== Cast ==
- Han Ye-ri as Eun-hee
- Ryo Iwase as Ryohei
- Lee Hee-joon as Woon-chul (Special appearance)
- Kwon Yul as Hyun-oh
- Kim Joon-beom as Gyoo-hwan
- Lee Seung-yeon as Yoo-jin
- Choi Yu-hwa as Hyun-kyung

== Awards and nominations ==
Year	Award/Festival	Category	Nominee	Result
2016	38th Moscow International Film Festival	FIRESCI Award	Worst Woman	Won
2016	37th Blue Dragon Film Awards	Best Actress	Han Ye-ri	Nominated
2017	4th Wildflower Film Awards	Best Actress	Han Ye-ri	Nominated
2017	53rd Baeksang Arts Awards	Best Actress	Han Ye-ri	Nominated
2017	12th University Film Festival of Korea	Best Actress	Han Ye-ri	Won
