= My Heart Is Broken (disambiguation) =

My Heart Is Broken is a song by Evanescence

My Heart Is Broken may also refer to:

- My Heart Is Broken, 1964 collection of stories by Mavis Gallant
- "My Heart Is Broken", song by Ryan Adams from Jacksonville City Nights and Theme for a Trucker

== See also ==
- "My Heart Is Broken in Three", single by Slim Whitman 1952
- My Heart Is Not Broken Yet, a 2007 South Korean documentary film
