= Lee Young-jin (actress) =

South Korean model turned actress (born 1981)

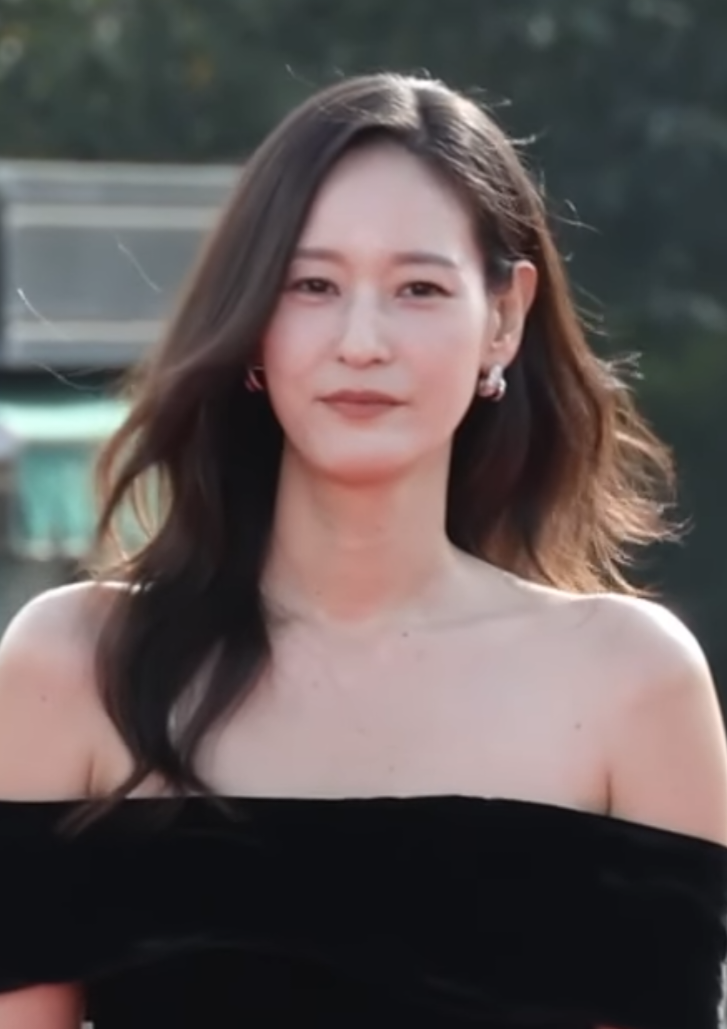
- Lee in October 2025
- Born: February 24, 1981 (age 45); South Korea
- Other name: Rie Young-zin
- Occupation: Actress
- Agent: Different Company

Korean name
- Hangul: 이영진
- Hanja: 李英珍
- RR: I Yeongjin
- MR: I Yŏngjin

Lee Young-jin (also stylized as Rie Young-zin; born February 24, 1981) is a South Korean model turned actress. She starred in the film Dear Dolphin.

== Filmography ==
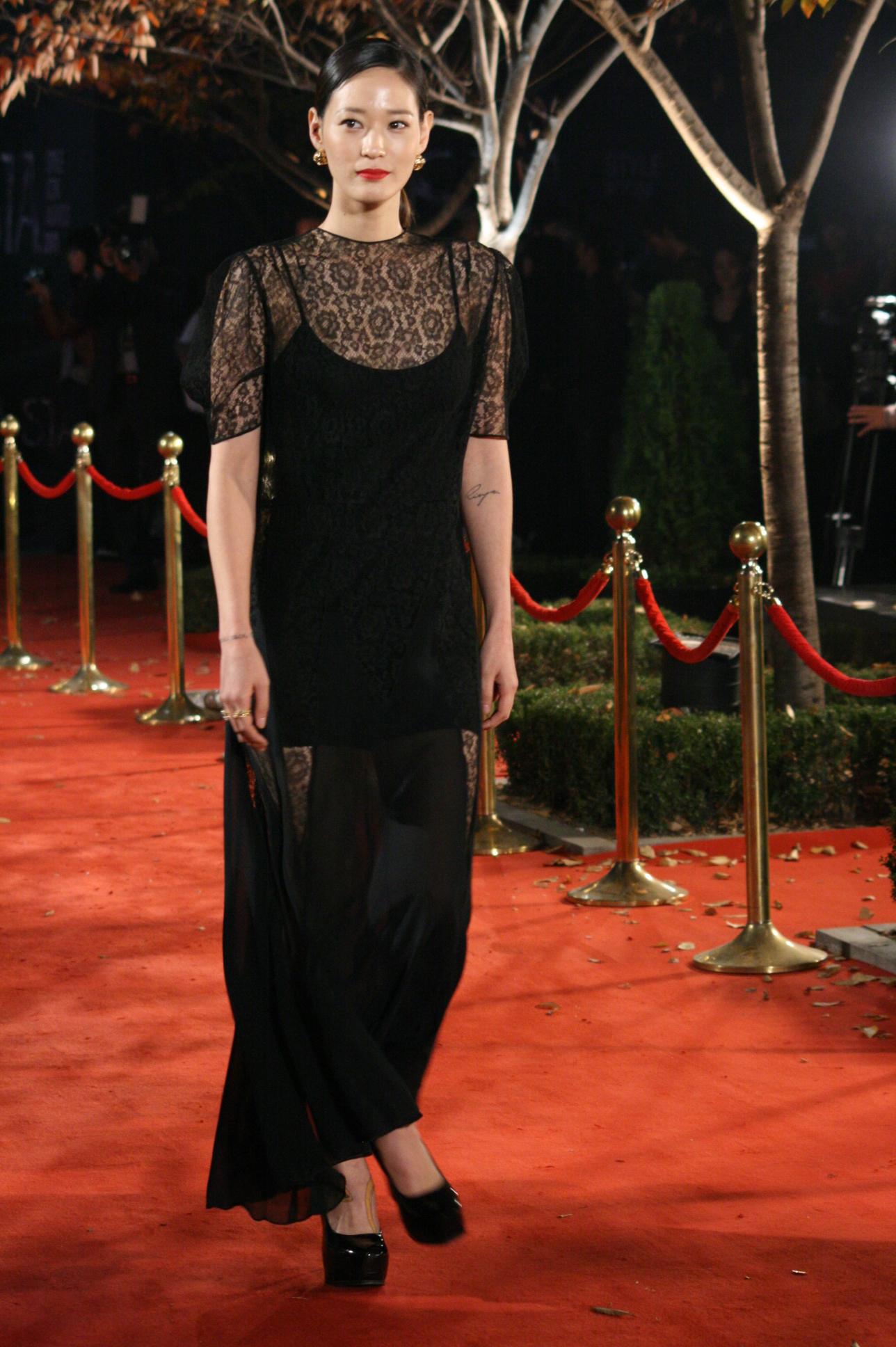
Lee in 2011

=== Film ===
Year	Title	Role	Notes/Ref.
1999	Memento Mori	Shi-eun	
2000	01412 Sect of the Magic Sword	Yu-ri	
2002	A.F.R.I.K.A.	Jin-ah	
2002	Surprise		
2003	Into the Mirror	Choi Mi-jeong	
2008	Crazy Waiting	Han-na	
2008	Antique	Jin-hyeok's girlfriend	
2009	4th Period Mystery	Sang-mi	
2009	Yoga Hakwon	Seon-hwa	
2012	Eighteen, Nineteen	Gi-joo	
2013	Melo	Coffee shop manager	
2013	Boomerang Family	Seo Mi-ok	
2013	Dear Dolphin	Won Ki-ok	
2015	Eternal Triangle	as herself	short film (also credited as director)
2015	You Call It Passion	Jae-kwan's sister-in-law	
2016	Sori: Voice from the Heart	Yoo Sung-jin	
2018	The Pension	Woman	
2019	The First Issue		
2019	Juror 8	Prosecutor	
2019	Between the Seasons	Hae-soo	
2020	Lucky Chan-sil	an actress	
2022	Urban Myths	Eun-yeong	

=== Television series ===
Year	Title	Role	Notes/Ref.
2005	That Summer's Typhoon	Stewardess	
2006	Special Crime Investigation: "Murder in the Blue House"	Ji Hye-yeon	
2006	Coma	Hong-ah	
2008	Fight	So-hee	
2016	The Master of Revenge	Kim Kyung-jang	
2018	Tempted	Jung Na-yoon	
2018	Matrimonial Chaos	Jang Se-jin	
2019	Doctor Detective	Byeon Jeong-ho	
2020	Memorist	Seo Hee-soo / Sung Ju-ran	
2020	Handmade Love	The Absolute	
2021	Here's My Plan	Kim Yoo-mi	
2023–2024	The Story of Park's Marriage Contract	Cheon Myung	

== Ambassadorship ==
- Unobstructed Film Ambassadors (2023)
