= Kang Jin-a =

South Korean filmmaker (born 1981)

- Born: August 18, 1981 (age 44); South Korea
- Occupation(s): Film director screenwriter

Korean name
- Hangul: 강진아
- RR: Gang Jina
- MR: Kang China

Kang Jin-a (Korean: 강진아; born August 18, 1981) is a South Korean film director and screenwriter.

== Early life ==
Kang graduated from Hongik University's Department of Visual Design in 2004.

== Career ==
Kang's work mainly deals with the themes of life and death, including Suicide of the Quadruplets (2008), Be with Me (2009) and Paprika Feast (2011). Her short Be with Me (2009) won the Best Film in A Short Film About Love at the 9th Mise-en-scène Short Film Festival in 2010. Her directorial feature debut Dear Dolphin (2013), an exploration of life, love and grief, premiered at the 14th Jeonju International Film Festival and won the CGV Movie Collage Prize. Pierce Conran of Twitch Film praised "Kang's natural ability as both a storyteller and a stylist" but described some elements of the film as derivative, while Derek Elley of Film Business Asia was more critical, stating that it "lacks the wrenching feeling it should have built towards".

Kang's next work after Dear Dolphin, entitled That's Not True, was released in 2015 as part of KT&G Sangsangmadang's "Mag(Magazine) Movie Project: A Woman and A Man", and starred veteran actress Lee Mi-yeon as well as singer Baro.

== Filmography ==
=== As director/screenwriter ===
- Suicide of the Quadruplets (short film, 2008) - director
- Be with Me (short film, 2009) - director, screenwriter
- 49th Day (short film, 2011) - director
- Nice Shorts! 2011 (segment: "Growing Old Together") (2011) - director, screenwriter
- Paprika Feast (구천리 마을잔치; short film, 2011) - director, screenwriter
- Dear Dolphin (2013) - director, screenwriter
- That's Not True (그게 아니고; short film, 2015) - director

=== As editor ===
- Volcano High (2001) - location editor
- The Squadron Vignette (short film, 2003) - assistant director, script editor
- Blind Interview (short film, 2004) - editor
- Camellia Project (2005) - assistant editor
- Be with Me (short film, 2009) - editor
- Nice Shorts! 2011 (segment: "Growing Old Together") (2011) - editor

=== Trailer ===
- My Teacher, Mr. Kim (2003)
- Save the Green Planet! (2003)
- A Good Lawyer's Wife (2003)
- Once Upon a Time in a Battlefield (2003)
- Ice Rain (2004)
- Au Revoir, UFO (2004)
- Spider Forest (2004)

=== Visual effect ===
- Save the Green Planet! (2003)
- Ice Rain (2004)
- Au Revoir, UFO (2004)

=== Art direction ===
- The Coast Guard (2002)
