= Kim Min-ji (actress) =

South Korean actress (born 1992)

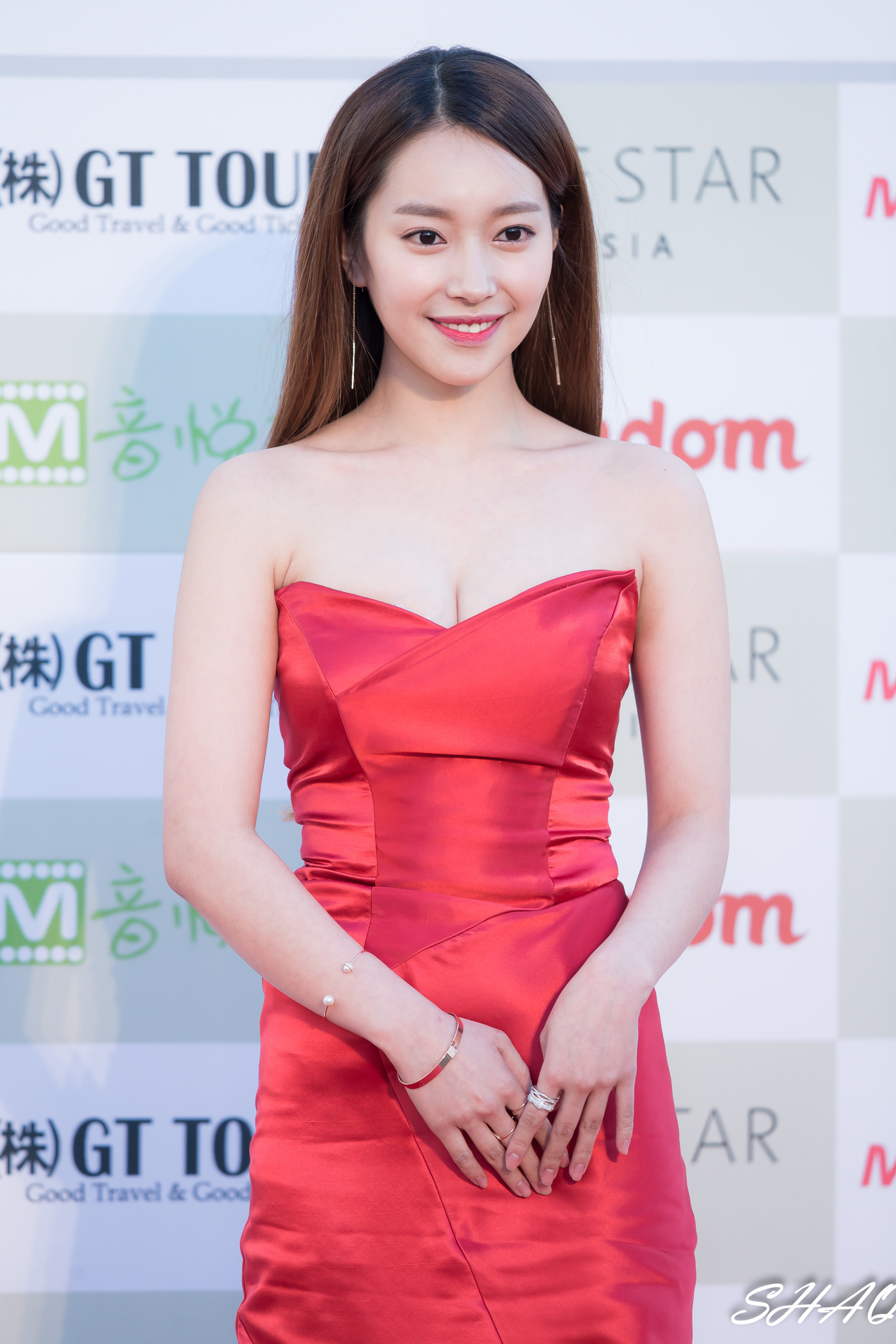
- Kim in 2016
- Born: April 11, 1992 (age 34)
- Other name: Seo Min-ji
- Education: Chung-Ang University - Theater and Film
- Occupation: Actress
- Years active: 2008–present
- Agent: Mask Studio

Korean name
- Hangul: 김민지
- RR: Gim Minji
- MR: Kim Minji
- Website: maskstudio.kr

Kim Min-ji (Korean: 김민지; born April 11, 1992) is a South Korean actress. She also hosted Music Bank from December 2010 to October 2011.

From 2013 to 2016, she was known as Seo Min-ji (서민지). She later used her birth name again.

== Filmography ==
=== Television series ===
- Here He Comes (MBC, 2008) - Kim Min-ji
- Empress Cheonchu (KBS2, 2009) - young Lady Kim
- Boys Over Flowers (KBS2, 2009) - Jang Yu-mi
- Again, My Love (KBS2, 2009) - young Hye-jeong
- A Man Called God (MBC, 2010) - Hye-jeong
- KBS Drama Special - The Scary One, The Ghost and I (KBS2, 2010) - Ghost
- Golden Cross (KBS2, 2014) - Kang Ha-yoon (first credit with new stage name)
- Midnight's Girl (MBC every1, 2015) - Min Se-ra
- Persevere, Goo Hae Ra (Mnet, 2015) - Scarlet (Grace Hwang)
- The Ace (SBS, 2015) - Park Soo-min
- Woman with a Suitcase (MBC, 2016) - Seo Ji-ah (first credit under her birth name after three years)
- Manhole (KBS2, 2017)
- Rich Man (MBN & Dramax, 2018)

=== Film ===
- The Boy from Ipanema (2010) - girl
- Finding Mr. Destiny (2010) - Chae-ri

=== Variety show ===
- Music Bank (KBS2, 2010–2011)

=== Music video appearances ===
- Epik High - "1분 1초" (2008)
- Zia - "터질 것 같아" (2009)
- Clazziquai Project - "Wizard of Oz" (2009)

== Musical ==
Year	Title	Notes	Ref.
2022	Themselves	Three episodes will be produced as a large-scale musical	
