= The Table (2016 film) =

2016 film by Kim Jong-kwan

- Theatrical release poster
- Hangul: 더 테이블
- RR: Deo teibeul
- MR: Tŏ t'eibŭl
- Directed by: Kim Jong-kwan
- Written by: Kim Jong-kwan
- Produced by: Jenna Ku
- Starring: Jung Yu-mi; Han Ye-ri; Jung Eun-chae; Im Soo-jung
- Cinematography: Kim Ji-yong; Lee Seung-hun
- Edited by: Won Chang-jae
- Music by: Narae
- Production company: Vol Media K
- Release dates: October 7, 2016 (BIFF); August 24, 2017 (South Korea)
- Running time: 70 minutes
- Country: South Korea
- Language: Korean
- Box office: US$719,760

The Table (Korean: 더 테이블) is a 2016 South Korean drama film written and directed by Kim Jong-kwan. It stars Jung Yu-mi, Han Ye-ri, Jung Eun-chae and Im Soo-jung.

== Plot ==
In a café in Seoul, seated at the same table from morning until evening, four different women engage in conversations exploring old and new relationships. A successful actress and her ex-boyfriend, an office worker more interested in bragging about their connection to his colleagues; a man and a woman who had a one-night stand and awkwardly meet again after some time he spent abroad, trying to ascertain how important they are to one another; a woman about to be married and the older woman hired to play her mother at her wedding; a woman who asks her ex-boyfriend, who is still in love with her, to have a last fling before her marriage to a more "suitable" groom.

== Cast ==
- Jung Yu-mi as Yu-jin
- Han Ye-ri as Eun-hee
- Jung Eun-chae as Kyung-jin
- Im Soo-jung as Hye-gyeong
- Kim Hye-ok as Sook-hee
- Yeon Woo-jin as Woon-cheol
- Jung Jun-won as Chang-seok
- Jeon Sung-woo as Min-ho
