= As One (film) =

2012 South Korean historical sports film

- Hangul: 코리아
- RR: Koria
- MR: K'oria
- Directed by: Moon Hyun-sung
- Written by: Kwon Seong-hwi; Yoo Young-ah
- Produced by: Lee Su-nam; Kim Ji-hoon; Lee Han-seung; Min Jong-eun
- Starring: Ha Ji-won; Bae Doona
- Cinematography: Jo Dong-heon
- Edited by: Kim Sun-min
- Music by: Kim Tae-seong
- Distributed by: CJ Entertainment
- Release date: May 3, 2012
- Running time: 127 minutes
- Country: South Korea
- Language: Korean
- Box office: US$11.8 million

As One (Korean: 코리아; RR: Koria; lit. 'Korea') is a 2012 South Korean sports drama film starring Ha Ji-won and Bae Doona. It is a cinematic retelling of the first ever post-war Unified Korea sports team which won the women's team gold medal at the 1991 World Table Tennis Championships in Chiba, Japan. Director Moon Hyun-sung used the foundation of true events to tell the story of a team that united a divided nation for the first time in its painful history.

== Background ==
Following the North Korean mid-air bombing of Korean Air Flight 858 in 1987, a Summit was held between North and South Korea to defuse the extreme tension on the Korean peninsula. The summit ended with the agreement to hastily form a unified Korean sports team; and table tennis, being highly visible and world-class in both countries, was chosen as the symbolic unifier. Summarily, the first-ever unified North-South team under the simple aegis "KOREA" was formed to compete in the 1991 World Table Tennis Championships in Chiba, Japan.

== Plot ==
Beijing, 11th Asian Games, autumn 1990. In the women's table tennis competition, North Korea's Ri Bun-hui (Bae Doona) faces off against South Korea's Hyun Jung-hwa (Ha Ji-won); Bun-hui loses, but Jung-hwa is beaten by China's Deng Yaping (Kim Jae-hwa), who takes the gold. Six months later, in Busan, Jung-hwa is finishing her preparation for the 41st World Table Tennis Championships, to be held in Chiba, Japan; aside from caring for her father in the hospital, she is under huge local pressure to win a gold medal this time. Just prior to leaving, it is announced that, following a North-South Summit, the North and South Korean teams will compete as a single unit for the first time, under a newly designed Korean Unification Flag and with a North Korean, Jo Nam-poong (Kim Eung-soo), as its chief trainer. In Chiba, quarrels and fights break out between the two, mutually suspicious sides, exacerbated by young Northern hothead Choi Kyung-sub (Lee Jong-suk) and Southern joker Oh Doo-man (Oh Jung-se). Jung-hwa shares a room with fellow player Choi Yeon-jung (Choi Yoon-young), who fancies Kyung-sub. Bun-hui rooms with Yu Sun-bok (Han Ye-ri) who suffers badly from competition nerves. During the trials for the women's team, Sun-bok performs poorly and steps down in favor of Jung-hwa for the good of the team. Now paired together, Jung-hwa and Bun-hui settle their differences as the players finally start to bond. As they train for 46 days, game-by-game, the two find a budding friendship. But as the finals versus the Chinese team looms, the Koreans' unity is threatened from another direction. When political winds change again and just as suddenly an announcement is made to disband team Korea, the two young women must prove to their people and the world that teamwork can outshine the dark shadows of a painful history.

== Cast ==
- Ha Ji-won - Hyun Jung-hwa
- Bae Doona - Ri Bun-hui
- Han Ye-ri - Yu Sun-bok, Bun-hui's roommate
- Choi Yoon-young - Choi Yeon-jung, Jung-hwa's roommate
- Park Chul-min - Lee Eun-il, South Korean trainer
- Kim Eung-soo - Jo Nam-poong, North Korean trainer
- Oh Jung-se - Oh Doo-man
- Lee Jong-suk - Choi Kyung-sub
- Park Yeong-seo - Chu Il-song
- Kwon Tae-won - Choi, delegation leader
- Yu Cheong-gwan - Park, team leader
- Park Jeong-hak - Jang Myong-guk, North Korean security chief
- Kim Jae-hwa - Deng Yaping, Chinese champion
- Mike Meier - umpire in finals
- Paul Stafford - Matthew, UK announcer
- Cha Chung-hwa - Korea cheering team

== Production ==
When director Kim Jee-woon first came to her about the idea for a film about the 1991 championships, South Korean table tennis legend and Olympic gold medalist Hyun Jung-hwa reportedly answered, "Why didn't you approach me sooner?"

Kim was originally slated to direct the feature, but was later replaced by Moon Hyun-sung. Moon Hyun-sung began his career in 2007 as the script supervisor for May 18, and then as an assistant director with Yoga. Making his feature debut with As One, Moon said he felt it was crucial that his own voice as a director didn't outshine the drama of the real-life story, so he let it unfold very naturally. He also took extra precautions to ensure that the North Korean dialects in the film were as realistic as possible. In addition to the grueling physical training, all the actors performing North Korean roles had speech lessons for North Korean accents where even subtle differences in regional accents such as Ri Bun-hui's Pyongyang accent and Yu Sun-bok's Hamgyŏng accent were honed.

Because the tournament was a fairly recent event, the production received invaluable assistance from many of those who were actually present at the tournament, witnessing the events unfold, thus adding another layer of authenticity to the film. The project became dear to Hyun Jung-hwa's heart and reflecting her enthusiasm, she and other players active at the time participated in all aspects of production from the beginning to the end, and the retired athletes all availed themselves to on-set coaching sessions, with Hyun in particular personally coaching the two lead actresses. In addition to current referees, the actual referees who made calls at the 1991 tournament appear in the film to provide natural actions and reactions as well as to consult on set. Because the actors and even extras were so conscientious about recreating such a well-publicized event, the film captures the look and feel of the historical tournament.

Aside from the main cast, the production sought out many supporting roles and extras to play international-quality table tennis. From the Korea Table Tennis Association official players, where the real Hyun Jung-hwa is currently Executive Director, to current national table tennis players of Hungary and France, top athletes appeared throughout the film for added realism.

The actresses started their training four months prior to the start of principal shooting. This was Ha Ji-won's first time playing table tennis, while Bae Doona played some back in her primary school days. Choi Yoon-young, Oh Jung-se and other cast members also trained together for a total of seven months of intensive training. Because of the entire cast's efforts, there were no body doubles for the tournament shots.

In the case of Ha, she had injured her ankle during the filming of Sector 7 and was in the process of recovery. Yet she still kept up with highly intensive training, liking the physical challenges of learning the sport and recreating a true story. Ha had been Hyun's first choice to play her, and the actress observed Hyun's speech and body language carefully during training, striving to embody all of Hyun's playing habits and techniques.

It was no easy task for Bae as well, training to the point where she lost toe nails. She also had the added disadvantage of playing a left-handed character, because she had to readjust to a new playing style. Even though Ri Bun-hui's left-handed style was not well-known, Bae wanted to maintain a high level of authenticity. Unlike Ha's direct training sessions with her real-life counterpart, Bae was unable to contact or meet with Ri Bun-hui, having to rely on videos and tutoring instead.

The tournament games were shot at Andong University's indoor stadium, where a July heatwave was multiplied by the heat from lighting, raising the temperature to over 120 degrees Fahrenheit inside. Despite these hellish conditions, the actors continued to perform selflessly. There were constant minor injuries from slips and falls, as well as from performing difficult moves, and physiotherapists had to be on standby on the set at all times. Shooting the final game against the Chinese team was a culmination of the training and difficult photography, bringing all the players to genuine tears.

Despite prolonged training, the actors could only imitate the game, but could not play at the level of world champions. Therefore, shooting scenes of the competitions were filmed without the ball. Later the ball was completed by a computer.

Bae and Ha found it refreshing to play strong women in the film, without a leading man by their side. Bae said, "It is so rare in films nowadays for actresses to be able to tell a story about women in films, with a cast full of other actresses. Even though the film touches upon themes of a divided Korea through a sports tournament, it is ultimately about the friendship and love between two women."

One of the more touching moments in the film takes place towards the end, when Hyun gives Ri a ring as a token of friendship as Ri sits on the bus that is headed back to North Korea. In reality, Hyun said that she gave the ring to Ri, complete with an engraving of Hyun and Ri's names inside, on the last day of their stay in Japan. "I told her that I wanted her to remember me," said Hyun. She added that after the 1991 tournament, she saw Ri one last time in 1993, as a competitor representing North Korea. "I still feel very emotional when I think of her."

== Box office ==
As One opened in South Korea on May 3, 2012, and despite competing against Hollywood films The Avengers and Dark Shadows, it was viewed by 1.2 million viewers 10 days after its release. It eventually reached a total of 1,872,683 admissions, with a gross of ₩13,448,864,500 (or US$11,794,204).

A special premiere was held in Chiba on April 20, 2012, to thank the Korean people in Japan who cheered for Korea's victory in 1991. A year later, the film also received a theatrical release in Japan on April 20, 2013, under the title Hana - miraculous 46 days through Sumomo Co., Ltd. (which distributed the film after four other companies refused).

== Awards and nominations ==
Year	Award	Category	Recipient	Result	Ref.
2012	33rd Blue Dragon Film Awards	Best New Actress	Han Ye-ri	Nominated	
2013	49th Baeksang Arts Awards	Best New Actress	Han Ye-ri	Won	
2013	49th Baeksang Arts Awards	Best New Director	Moon Hyun-sung	Nominated	
