= Song Sin-do =

Korean actress and comfort woman (1922–2017)

Song Sin-do 송신도
- Born: November 24, 1922; Chūseinan Province, Korea, Empire of Japan
- Died: December 16, 2017 (aged 95); Tokyo, Japan
- Occupations: Human rights activist, Actress

Korean name
- Hangul: 송신도
- Hanja: 宋神道
- RR: Song Sindo
- MR: Song Sindo

Song Sin-do (Korean: 송신도; November 24, 1922 – December 16, 2017) was a Korean former comfort woman who had been living and campaigning in Japan for an official apology from the Japanese government. She had also recognised the need for the history of comfort women to be taught in Japanese schools to prevent a recurrence of the situation.

== Background ==
Song Sin-do escaped a forced marriage at the age of 16 years by signing up to assist on the Japanese front line. However, like many thousands of young Korean and Chinese girls who believed they would work in factories or as nurses' assistants, Song Sin-do was taken to a comfort house to work as a sexual slave for seven years. During this time Song was forced to give away two babies to local families and beaten repeatedly.

When the war ended in 1945, Song found she had nowhere to return to and so accepted the marriage proposal of a Japanese soldier who abandoned her on arrival in Japan. Song had lived with a Korean gentleman called Ha Jae-eun she sees as a father figure. In 1992 a document proving the Japanese government's involvement with the military brothels was found and a hotline called 'Comfort Woman 110' resultantly formed to provide support for the former comfort women. It was this way that Song's story was uncovered when the organisation contacted her and persuaded her to go public with her history.

== Legal action ==
A support group of Japanese citizens formed around Song and assisted her financially during the trial to receive an official apology for comfort women. However, although the Court recognised misconduct by the state, it deemed that the events were too far in the past to make a claim. Song and her supporters, however, are still campaigning for an official apology and visit many areas of Japan, particularly high schools, to tell of the plight of comfort women.

== Film ==
My Heart Is Not Broken Yet documents Song's story as she struggles for recognition for comfort women. It was released in August 2007 in Japan, but hit the Korean box office February 26, 2009. As opposed to the typical stance taken in response to the military atrocities, Song argues that the soldiers as well as the comfort women were victims of war. She also involved and welcomed several testimonies from veteran Japanese soldiers in the making of the film.

Actress Moon So-ri narrated the film, whilst Wadanabe Mihoko provided the narration for the Japanese release. The film also received the services of composer Pak Poe, considered the "Bob Dylan of Japan".

The film was distributed by Indiestory and funded by nearly 670 Japanese individuals. It was shown in Korea and Japan (with Korean subtitles), where according to the film's domestic distributor, a teenage girl was quoted as saying:

"It is necessary that many Japanese people be informed of (comfort women) and the movie must be seen in order to spread the knowledge."

A portion of the profit from ticket sales will be used to help fund the establishment of the War and Women's Museum in South Korea.

== See also ==
- The Korean Council for the Women Drafted for Military Sexual Slavery by Japan
- Jeonju International Film Festival#9th Jeonju International Film Festival (2008) - Song's documentary won the JJ-star Award.
