= The Truth Shall Not Sink with Sewol =

2014 South Korean documentary film

- Film poster
- Directed by: Lee Sang-ho; Ahn Hae-ryong
- Production companies: Asiapress; Cineport
- Distributed by: Cinemadal
- Release date: October 7, 2014 (Busan)
- Running time: 77 minutes
- Country: South Korea
- Language: Korean

The Truth Shall Not Sink with Sewol (Korean: 다이빙벨; RR: Daibingbel; lit. 'Diving Bell') is a South Korean documentary film about the sinking of the MV Sewol, directed by Lee Sang-ho and Ahn Hae-ryong. The documentary draws back the curtain on one of the most controversial parts of modern Korean history, the aftermath of the sinking of the MV Sewol, which resulted in the loss of 304 people. Through a variety of news reports and eyewitness testimonies, directors Lee Sang-ho and Ahn Hae-ryong show how the large South Korean media companies colluded with the government over the information about the sinking of the ferry. He highlights the suffering of the victims' families, their quest to discover the cause of the accident, and the truth behind the government's behavior during and after it. The documentary focuses on the use of a diving bell, a piece of equipment that allows divers to stay underwater for long periods of time.

== Synopsis ==
The documentary revolves around the story of Lee Jong-in, who is the head of a private diving company that offered the use of his equipment to assist in the rescue and recovery of the victims. He reportedly showed up during the disaster, with the equipment called a "diving bell" which can provide divers a place underwater to eat and rest, breathe, and can extend the time divers are underwater, and help place a diver in a specific location. While he was at first stonewalled by officials at the site, Lee Jong-in worked at his own expense before canceling his attempts. He was called back to continue work by government authorities after victims' families insisted that he return, but he reportedly found similar roadblocks from government and military officials.

== Controversy ==
After its completion, The Truth Shall Not Sink With Sewol was scheduled to screen at the 2014 Busan International Film Festival. However, at the time, the government sought to restrict portrayals of the Sewol ferry disaster within the media. Therefore, the chairman of the festival, Suh Byung-soo (also mayor of Busan at the time) requested that the organizers not screen the film. The organizers resisted the pressure and screened the documentary. This resulted in the film festival budget being slashed by over 50% over the following two years. The budget cut created a backlash due to news of the state trying to influence the film festival. Many filmmakers boycotted the event, which almost shut down the film festival altogether.

== Awards and recognition ==
The Truth Shall Not Sink With Sewol won the Grand Prize at the Fukuoka Asian Film Festival in 2015.

== Reception ==
Joshua Oppenheimer, a film director, was struck by the "incredibly incompetent rescue mission" depicted in the documentary and after viewing the film began to question the role of media in South Korea and the rest of the world.
