= Come, Together =

- Hangul: 컴, 투게더
- RR: Keom, tugedeo
- MR: K'ŏm, t'ugedŏ
- Directed by: Shin Dong-il
- Written by: Han Ji-soo; Shin Dong-il
- Produced by: Shin Dong-il
- Starring: Im Hyeon-gook; Lee Hye-eun; Chae Bin
- Cinematography: Kim Bow-ram
- Edited by: Moon In-dae
- Music by: Kwon Seong-mo
- Production company: Biashin Pictures
- Release dates: October 2016 (Busan International Film Festival); May 11, 2017 (South Korea)
- Running time: 113 minutes
- Country: South Korea
- Language: Korean

Come, Together (Korean: 컴, 투게더; RR: Keom, tugedeo) is a South Korean drama film directed by Shin Dong-il and released May 2017.

== Plot ==
An outlook on an ordinary Korean family contending with societal pressures in everyday life.

== Cast ==
- Lee Hye-eun as Mi-young
- Im Hyeon-gook as Beom-gu
- Chae Bin as Han-na
- Han Sung-yun as Ah-yeong
- Moon Jeong-soo
- Kim Jae-rok
- Lee Bom as Slender woman
- Han Kyeong-hyeon
- Bae Jeong-hwa as Eun-jeong
