= Love Guide for Dumpees =

- Poster
- Hangul: 극적인 하룻밤
- Hanja: 劇的인 하룻밤
- RR: Geukjeogin harutbam
- MR: Kŭkchŏgin haruppam
- Directed by: Ha Ki-ho
- Starring: Han Ye-ri; Yoon Kye-sang
- Release date: December 3, 2015
- Running time: 107 minutes
- Country: South Korea
- Language: Korean
- Box office: US$1.28 million

Love Guide for Dumpees (Korean: 극적인 하룻밤), also known as A Dramatic Night, is a 2015 South Korean romantic comedy film directed by Ha Ki-ho. It was released on December 3, 2015.

== Plot ==
At their ex's wedding, Jung-hoon (Wife's ex) meets Si-hoo (Groom's ex) at the reception and they fought over the last Salmon Sushi. Drunk Jung-hoon was driven home by Si-hoo who was determined to commit suicide at his house, as a form of revenge over his ex by taking different kinds of pills. Drunk Jung-hoon and drugged Si-hoo both had a one-night romp. One night turned into another, and Si-hoo decided they should fill the coffee coupon with 10 stamps (they already had 2) meeting each other just to have sex, after the 10th they could go separate ways.

== Cast ==
- Yoon Kye-sang as Jung-hoon
- Han Ye-ri as Si-hoo
- Park Hyo-joo as Joo-yun
- Park Byung-eun as Joon-suk
- Jung Soo-young as Teacher Kim
- Kim Jae-hwa as Dol-sook
- Oh Jung-se as Blind date man 3
- Kim Eui-sung as Doctor
- Jin Seon-kyu as Cafe man
- Kim Chang-hwan as Studio part-time worker
- Jo Bok-rae as Deok-rea
- Kim Seo-won as Rescue worker

== Reception ==
The film grossed US$1.28 million on its opening four days in South Korea.
