= Chae Bin =

South Korean actress (born 1997)

- Born: Kim Chae-bin; August 22, 1997 (age 29); South Korea
- Occupation: Actress
- Years active: 2005–present
- Agent: Namoo Actors

Korean name
- Hangul: 김채빈
- Hanja: 金彩彬
- RR: Gim Chaebin
- MR: Kim Ch'aebin

Kim Chae-bin (Korean: 김채빈; born August 22, 1997), also known by her stage name Chae Bin, is a South Korean actress. Known as the second Moon Geun-young due to her maturity and consistent acting, Chae-bin first drew viewer's attention for her performance in the television series Kim Su-ro, The Iron King (2010).

== Filmography ==
=== Film ===
Year	Title	Role
2002	Jungle Juice	
2005	The Light is Like Water (short film)	
2010	Le Grand Chef 2: Kimchi Battle	young Jang-eun
2011	The Suicide Forecast	Jin-hee
2011	In Love and War	young Park Seol-hee
2011	Link	Chae-bin
2012	Touch	Chae-bin
2017	Come, Together	Han-na

=== Television series ===
Year	Title	Role
2007	Even So Love	
2007	Chosun Police 1	
2010	Kim Su-ro, The Iron King	Yeoui
2012	Bachelor's Vegetable Store	teen Jin Jin-shim
2013	Two Weeks	Deaf woman's daughter (cameo)
2013	Drama Festival: "Surviving in Africa"	Seo Do-yoon
2014	I Need Romance 3	young Shin Joo-yeon
2015	KBS Drama Special: "Let's Stand Still"	Park Da-mi
2015	Splendid Politics	Queen Jangnyeol
2017	Witch at Court	Hyun Ji-soo
2019	Standby Curator	Lee Da-bi
2020	Man in a Veil	Kang Ye-jin

=== Music video appearances ===
Year	Song title	Artist
2018	"Forgotten"	Ji Woo-jin
