= Kim Jae-hwa =

South Korean actress

- 김재화
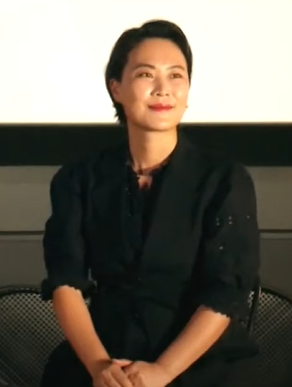
- Kim in July 2020
- Born: September 1, 1980 (age 45); Pyeongchang-dong, Jongno District, Seoul, South Korea
- Education: Chung-Ang University
- Occupation: Actress

Korean name
- Hangul: 김재화
- RR: Gim Jaehwa
- MR: Kim Chaehwa

Kim Jae-hwa (born September 1, 1980) is a South Korean actress.

== Career ==
Kim made her acting debut in 2009 in the film Harmony and she started to gain recognition following her role as Deng Yaping, Chinese champion of table tennis competition in the 2012 series As One.

In 2018 she appeared in MBC's TV series Real Man 300.

== Filmography ==
=== Film ===
Year	Title	Role	Notes	Ref.
2005	Cathy Blues	Park Young Sook	cameo	
2010	Harmony	Kwon Dal-nyeo (chorus member)		
2010	The Yellow Sea			
2011	Quick			
2011	Countdown			
2012	Love Fiction	Ma-yi		
2012	LOVE CALL			
2012	As One	Deng Yaping		
2012	Traffickers	Gong Choon-ja		
2013	Fasten Your Seatbelt	Kim Hwal-ran		
2014	Apostle			
2014	Mourning Grave	ghost		
2014	Manhole	Social Worker		
2014	Entangled	Myung-ja		
2014	Set Me Free	Young-jae's mother		
2014	The Royal Tailor	Ji-mil		
2014	How to Steal a Dog	Homeroom teacher		
2015	Chronicle of a Blood Merchant	Nurse at Jejoong Clinic		
2015	Shoot Me in the Heart	Princess Buckingham		
2015	Salut D'Amour	Madam Wang		
2015	Summer Snow	Choi Mi-yeon		
2015	A Dramatic Night			
2018	Microhabitat	Choi Jeong-mi		
2019	Idol	Soo-ryeon		
2020	Pawn	Madam Jeong		
2021	Escape from Mogadishu	Jo Soo-jin		
2021	Sinkhole	Kyung-mi		
2021	Short Bus		Shorts Film	
2021	Romance Without Love	chief editor		
2022	Honest Candidate 2	Rim Seon-hee	Special appearance	
2023	Kill Boksoon	Yoo Cheol-woo's mother	Special appearance	
2023	Extreme Festival	Hye-soo	Feature film	
2023	Miss Fortune	Kumiko		
2024	Blesser	Sang-yeon		
2024	The executioner2	beauty mother		

=== Television series ===
Year	Title	Role	Notes	Ref.
2012	What is Mom?			
2012	The Innocent Man			
2013	Heartless City	Park Eun-ae		
2014	Cunning Single Lady	Oh Bang-soon		
2014	The Idle Mermaid	Kim Woo-sun		
2015	D-Day	Kim Hyun-sook		
2016	Uncontrollably Fond	Kim Bong-sook		
2016	Fantastic	Jo Mi-sun		
2017	Good Manager	Na Hee-yong		
2017	The Happy Loner	nurse		
2017	Girls' Generation 1979	drill instructor		
2017	Witch at Court	Song Min-young		
2018	Secret Mother	Kang Hye-kyung		
2018	Room No. 9	Kam Mi-ran		
2018	My Strange Hero	Kang So-jung		
2019	Extraordinary You	art teacher		
2019	Pegasus Market	Jung Bok-dong's wife		
2020	Men Are Men	Butler Kim	Cameo (ep.6)	
2020	Oh My Baby	Shim Jung-hwa		
2022	Why Her	Jo Kang-ja		
2022	Cleaning Up	Maeng Soo-ja		
2022	The Law Cafe	Geum-ja	Cameo (ep 1–2)	
2024	The Judge from Hell	Jang Myeong-suk		
2024	The Tale of Lady Ok	Maxim		

=== Web series ===
Year	Title	Role	Ref.
2015	Sense 8		
2021	So Not Worth It	Aunt Mae	
2022	Kiss Sixth Sense	Cho Seon-hee	
2022	The King of the Desert	Hyeon-sook	

=== Television show ===
Year	Title	Role	Notes	Ref.
2021–2022	Goal Girl	Cast member	Season 1–2	

== Awards and nominations ==
Name of the award ceremony, year presented, category, nominee of the award, and the result of the nomination
Award ceremony	Year	Category	Nominee / Work	Result	Ref.
Baeksang Arts Awards	2022	Best Supporting Actress – Film	Escape from Mogadishu	Nominated	
Baeksang Arts Awards	2025	Best Supporting Actress – Television	The Tale of Lady Ok	Nominated	
Korean Association of Film Critics Awards	2024	Best Actress	Blesser	Won	
SBS Drama Awards	2022	Best Supporting Team	Why Her	Nominated	
SBS Drama Awards	2024	Best Supporting Actress in a Miniseries	The Judge from Hell	Won	
Wildflower Film Awards	2022	Best Supporting Actress / Actor	Action Hero	Won	
