= Dear Dolphin =

- Hangul: 환상속의 그대
- Hanja: 幻想속의 그대
- RR: Hwansangsogui geudae
- MR: Hwansangsogŭi kŭdae
- Directed by: Kang Jin-a
- Written by: Kang Jin-a; Choi Yeong-rim
- Produced by: Je Jeong-ju
- Starring: Lee Hee-joon; Lee Young-jin; Han Ye-ri
- Cinematography: Kim Jong-seon
- Edited by: Lee Yeon-jung; Choi Yeong-rim; Jung Byung-jin
- Music by: Go Jin-yeong
- Distributed by: M-Line Distribution
- Release date: May 16, 2013
- Running time: 110 minutes
- Country: South Korea
- Language: Korean

Dear Dolphin (Korean: 환상속의 그대) is a 2013 South Korean romance melodrama starring Lee Hee-joon, Lee Young-jin and Han Ye-ri, co-written and directed by Kang Jin-a in her directorial debut, it explores the themes of life, love, and grief. It premiered at the 14th Jeonju International Film Festival and won the CGV Movie Collage Prize.

== Plot ==
Cha-kyung (Han Ye-ri) and Hyuk-geun (Lee Hee-joon) are lovers. Gi-ok (Lee Young-jin), Cha-kyung's long-time close friend, has loved Hyuk-geun since they first met, but has kept her feelings hidden for the sake of her friendship with Cha-kyung. When Cha-kyung unexpectedly passes away in a car accident, the lives of both Hyuk-geun and Gi-ok change.

Even after a year, Hyuk-geun can't accept reality or move on, living in a fantasy in which Cha-kyung is still alive. On the other hand, Gi-ok acts as if the wound is healed and starts trying to act on her feelings toward Hyuk-geun.

== Cast ==
- Lee Hee-joon as Kim Hyuk-geun
- Lee Young-jin as Won Ki-ok
- Han Ye-ri as Sung Cha-kyung
- Gi Ju-bong as therapist
