= Bandhobi =

South Korean independent film

- Hangul: 반두비
- RR: Bandubi
- MR: Pandubi
- Directed by: Shin Dong-il
- Written by: Lee Chang-won; Shin Dong-il
- Produced by: Shin Dong-il; Kim Il-kwon
- Starring: Mahbub Alam Pollab; Baek Jin-hee
- Cinematography: Park Jong-chul
- Edited by: Moon In-dae
- Music by: Kim Jong-keun
- Distributed by: IndieStory
- Release date: 25 June 2009
- Running time: 107 minutes
- Country: South Korea
- Language: Korean

Bandhobi (Korean: 반두비; RR: Bandubi Bengali: বান্ধবী) is a 2009 South Korean independent film directed by Shin Dong-il, about a frustrated and rebellious high school student who ends up becoming a friend of a migrant worker from Bangladesh who is desperate to receive his unpaid wages back. The title means "female buddy" in Bengali.

Lead actor Mahbub Alam is a longtime resident of South Korea who entered the country as a migrant worker. He has since appeared in small film roles and become involved in various activist projects, including the launch of the Migrant Worker Film Festival, for which he serves as festival director.

== Plot ==
Karim (Mahbub Alam) is a 27-year-old Bangladeshi working in an industrial laundry. An intellectual whose academic degree was not recognized in South Korea, Karim's work permit is about to expire and he's still owed a year's pay by a previous employer, Shin (Jung Dong-gyu), who's not taking his calls; meanwhile, his wife back home is giving him a hard time about money problems.

Seventeen-year-old high schooler Min-seo (Baek Jin-hee) is a social loner at odds with her mother, Eun-joo (Lee Il-hwa), who has a jobless, live-in lover, Ki-hong (Park Hyuk-kwon), whom she's planning to marry. Minseo's friends all take after-school classes at study institutes, but her single mother can't afford to pay for them. She eventually gets an under the table job at a massage parlor in order to pay for English classes.

On the first day of summer vacation, Min-seo is riding the bus when Karim drops his wallet. He exits the bus, and Min-seo takes the wallet for herself. However, Karim soon realizes what happens and manages to chase Min-seo down in a side street. "Let's go to the police station," he says in excellent Korean, but Min-seo tries to dissuade Karim from reporting her to the police by offering to grant him a favor, and reluctantly agrees to help track down his former boss. As the unlikely pair pose as loan sharks, they find themselves transforming each other's worlds in unexpected ways. They slowly form a mutual understanding, with the girl asking indiscreet questions and the gentleman preaching about problems in South Korean society. For Min-seo, Karim is initially a convenient badge she can wear in a society she sees herself at war with. But as she lowers her defenses, the relationship touchingly turns into a friendship between two lonely souls. But Karim's visa will not last forever.

== Cast ==
- Mahbub Alam - Karim
- Baek Jin-hee - Min-seo
- Lee Il-hwa - Eun-joo
- Park Hyuk-kwon - Ki-hong
- Jung Dong-gyu - Representative Shin
- Kim Jae-rok - Homeroom teacher
- Kwon Hyuk-poong - Drunkard
- Hyun Won-hee - Ji-yeong
- Kim Mi-hee - Min-seo's friend
- Park Yeong - Gas station owner
- Choi In-sook - Representative Shin's wife
- Seo Wang-seok - Immigration control worker
- Jang Sebastian - Heinz
- Noh Jin-woo - Factory department manager
- Jung Sung-hoon - Factory worker
- Lee Dong-gyu - Convenience store worker/part-timer
- Yang Hae-hoon - Son at gas station
- Oh Chang-kyung - Detective Oh
- Jang Dae-yoon - Detective Jang
- Jo Eun-kyung - Massage section chief
- Shin Yi-soo - Massage guest
- Baek Geon-yeong - Businessman
- Bang Yeong-seon - Convenience store guest
- Kim Sun, Kim Dong-myeong - Jogging couple
- Kang Bo-mi - Academy student
- Sonia - Trisha
- Yoon Sung-ho - Passerby
- Jung Byung-gil - Passerby

== Awards ==
- 2010 23rd Castellinaria International Youth Film Festival: Utopia Prize
- 2009 31st Festival of the Three Continents: Best Film Award
- 2009 3rd Tanabe Benkei Film Festival: Jury's Special Award, Cinematic Jury's Award
- 2009 11th Seoul International Youth Film Festival: Audience Award - Discovery of Korea Coming-of-Age Film
- 2009 10th Jeonju International Film Festival: Audience Critics' Award, CJ CGV Distribution Support Award
