= The Boy from Ipanema (film) =

- Hangul: 이파네마 소년
- RR: Ipanema sonyeon
- MR: Ip'anema sonyŏn
- Directed by: Kim Kih-hoon
- Written by: Kim Kih-hoon
- Produced by: Kim Kih-hoon
- Starring: Lee Soo-hyuk; Kim Min-ji
- Cinematography: Choi Se-kyu
- Release date: 4 November 2010
- Running time: 95 minutes
- Country: South Korea
- Language: Korean

The Boy from Ipanema (Korean: 이파네마 소년; RR: Ipanema sonyeon is a 2010 South Korean independent teen fantasy romance film filmed in Busan and Sapporo.

== Plot ==
A young woman falls in love with a beach boy who dreams to be in Ipanema.

== Cast ==
- Lee Soo-hyuk as Boy
- Kim Min-ji as Girl
- Chun Woo-hee as Friend

== Awards ==
- 2010 Jeonju International Film Festival: Audience Critic's Award
- 2010 Jeonju International Film Festival: Movie Collage Award
