= Ahn Hae-ryong =

Korean filmmaker

- Born: 1961 (age 64–65); South Korea
- Occupations: Documentary filmmaker cinematographer

Korean name
- Hangul: 안해룡
- Hanja: 安海龍
- RR: An Haeryong
- MR: An Haeryong

Ahn Hae-ryong (Korean: 안해룡; born 1961) is a South Korean documentary filmmaker and cinematographer.

Ahn's documentary film My Heart Is Not Broken Yet (2009) documents former comfort woman Song Sin-do.

He released The Truth Shall Not Sink with Sewol in 2014 and won Grand Prize at the Fukuoka Asian Film Festival in 2015.

== Filmography ==
- Beullaekkorian (블랙코리안, short film, 1996) - director
- Silent Crying (documentary short, 2003) - director, cinematographer, producer
- Osaka Eleven: A Story of Osaka Korean High school Soccer Team (documentary, 2007) - co-producer
- My Heart Is Not Broken Yet (documentary, 2009) - director, cinematographer
- The Truth Shall Not Sink with Sewol (documentary, 2014) - director
- Pungjine Muthin Manghyangga (풍진에 묻힌 망향가, short film) - director
