= Shin Dong-il =

South Korean filmmaker (born 1968)

- Born: 1968 (age 57–58); Seoul, South Korea
- Education: Korean Academy of Film Arts - Film directing
- Occupations: Film director, screenwriter

Korean name
- Hangul: 신동일
- RR: Sin Dongil
- MR: Sin Tongil

Shin Dong-il (Korean: 신동일; born 1968) is a South Korean film director and script writer. His movies draw attention to social issues and class differences through well-developed, complex characters and relationships.

== Career ==
Shin studied German literature and went on to study filmmaking at the Korean Academy of Film Arts. He made several short films. One of them, The Holy Family (2001), was screened at Cannes Film Festival Short Films Competition. His feature debut Host & Guest was selected for the APEC section at the 10th Busan International Film Festival in 2005 and was screened at the Berlin IFF in 2006 in the International Forum of Young Cinema. His latest movie Come, Together premiered at 21st Busan International Film Festival in 2016.

== Filmography ==
- The Holy Family (2001) - short film
- Host & Guest (2006)
- My Friend & His Wife (2008)
- Bandhobi (2009)
- If You Were Me 5 (2010) - segment "Her Story Taking"
- Come, Together (2017)
- Fly High (2017) - TV show (6 episodes)

== Awards ==
- 2009 10th Jeonju International Film Festival: Audience Critics' Award & CGV Korean Independent Feature Distribution Award (Bandhobi)
- 2009 Nantes Three Continents Festival: Golden Montgolfiere (Bandhobi)
- 2009 Seattle International Film Festival: New Director's Showcase Award (Bandhobi)
