= Kim Jong-kwan =

South Korean filmmaker (born 1975)

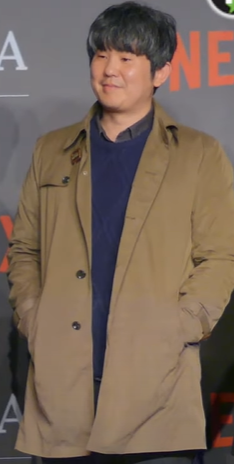
- Kim in 2019
- Born: 1975 (age 50–51); Daejeon, South Korea
- Education: Seoul Institute of the Arts
- Occupations: Film director screenwriter

Korean name
- Hangul: 김종관
- RR: Gim Jonggwan
- MR: Kim Chonggwan

Kim Jong-kwan (Korean: 김종관; born 1975) is a South Korean film director and screenwriter. Kim is an acclaimed and prolific short filmmaker known for his inventive short form narratives. He has helmed the omnibuses Lovers (2008) and Come, Closer (2010). His first feature Worst Woman (2016) which debuted at the 17th Jeonju International Film Festival, won the FIRESCI Award at the 38th Moscow International Film Festival in 2016.

== Personal life ==
Born in 1975 in Daejeon, Kim graduated from Seoul Institute of the Arts, majoring in Film.

== Filmography ==
=== Short films ===
- Street Story (2000) - director
- Wind Story (2002) - director, screenwriter, cinematographer
- Wounded (2002) - director, screenwriter, cinematographer, editor
- The Limit Time of Distribution (2003) - cinematographer
- Tell Her I Love Her (2003) - director, screenwriter, cinematographer, art director, editor, producer
- How to Operate a Polaroid Camera (2004) - director, screenwriter, cinematographer, art director, editor
- One Shining Day (segment: "Good-bye") (2005) - director, screenwriter
- Waiting for Youngjae (2005) - director, screenwriter, editor
- Slowly (2005) - director, screenwriter, editor
- Monologue #1 (2006) - director, screenwriter, cinematographer, editor, producer
- A Lonely Season (2006) - director
- Dialogue of Silence (2006) - director
- Screwdriver (2006) - director, cinematographer, editor
- Series Dasepo Naughty Girl (2006) - director
- Short! Short! Short! (segment: "'Waiting") (2007) - director, screenwriter, cinematographer
- The Diaper Of Daughters (2007) - cinematographer
- Lost (2007) - director, screenwriter, cinematographer
- Trend Of This Fall (2008) - director, screenwriter, editor
- Short! Short! Short! (segment: "Coin Boy") (2009) - director
- Whispers In The Wind (2010) - director
- One Perfect Day (2013) - screenwriter
- Phantoms of the Archive (2014) - director, screenwriter
- Persona (2019) - director, screenwriter

=== Omnibus films ===
- Lovers (2008) - director, screenwriter, cinematographer, editor, producer (consisting of 11 short films)
- Come, Closer (2010) - director, screenwriter

=== Feature films ===
Year	Title	Notes	Ref.
2016	Worst Woman	director, screenwriter	
2017	The Table	director, screenwriter	
2017	Chae's Movie Theater	director	
2019	Shades of the Heart	director, screenwriter	
2020	Josée	director, screenwriter	
2026	The Table: Day and Night	director, screenwriter, opening film of Busan	

== Awards and nominations ==
Award/Festival	Year	Category	Nominee	Result	Ref.
38th Moscow International Film Festival	2016	FIRESCI Award	Worst Woman	Won	
5th Resfest Digital Film Festival	2004	Audience Award	How to Operate a Polaroid	Won	
5th Resfest Digital Film Festival	2004	Festival Choice Award	How to Operate a Polaroid	Won	
3rd Mise-en-scène Short Film Festival	2004	Special Jury Award	How to Operate a Polaroid	Won	
31st Seoul Independent Film Festival (Note: formerly the Golden Crown Film Festival, Korea Youth Film Festival, Korea Independent Short Film Festival)	2005	Best Film Award (CJ Award)	Paradise	Won	
31st Seoul Independent Film Festival	2005	Naver Award	Paradise	Won	
