= Jeonju International Film Festival =

Film festival in South Korea

Coordinates: 35°49′N 127°09′E

- Official poster 2024
- Opening film: After Yang by Kogonada
- Closing film: Full Time by Éric Gravel
- Location: Jeonju Film Street, Jeonju, South Korea
- Founded: 2000
- Most recent: 2026
- Hosted by: JEONJU IFF Organizing Committee
- No. of films: 237 films from 54 countries
- Festival date: April 29–May 8, 2026
- Language: International
- Website: www.jiff.or.kr

Current 27th
- 28th 26th

- Jeonju International Film Festival
- Hangul: 전주국제영화제
- Hanja: 全州國際映畫祭
- RR: Jeonju gukje yeonghwaje
- MR: Chŏnju kukche yŏnghwaje

Jeonju International Film Festival (JIFF, Korean: 전주국제영화제) is an Asian film festival based in South Korea. It was launched in 2000 as a non-competitive film festival seeking to introduce independent and experimental films to the general public and focusing on the art of contemporary cinematography.

In the first edition of JIFF, the debut films of Darren Aronofsky were introduced to South Korea. For the first time in Asia, JIFF highlighted the early works of Béla Tarr as well. The winners of Jeonju IFF's International Competition Section include Ying Liang, John Akomfrah, and Miike Takashi.

Jeonju has also invested in films that were later produced by the festival. Directors who attended Jeonju IFF were invited again to join Jeonju Digital Project (JDP), with a set of three digital shorts. JDP granted financial support to masters for their short films and world-premiered those pieces in Jeonju.

Celebrating its 15th edition, JDP has expanded to feature-length films along with György Pálfi (Hungary) and Park Jung bum/Shin Yeon-shick (Republic of Korea).

JIFF also features an experimental category called Expanded Cinema (formerly called Stranger than Cinema).

== History ==
=== 1st Jeonju International Film Festival (2000) ===
- Apr 28 – May 4, 2000
- Number of Films: 292 films from 21 countries
  - Opening Film: Virgin Stripped Bare by Her Bachelors (HONG Sang-soo, Korea)
  - Closing Film: M/OTHER (SUWA Nobuhiro, Japan)
  - Woosuk Award (Asian Indie-Cine Forum): M/OTHER (SUWA Nobuhiro, Japan)
  - Daring Digital Award (N-Vision): Riot (John AKOMFRAH, England)
  - Chonju People’s Award (Cinemascape): Audition (MIIKE Takashi, Japan)

=== 2nd Jeonju International Film Festival (2001) ===
- Apr 27 – May 3, 2001
- Number of Films: 202 films from 28 countries
  - Opening Film: Waikiki Brothers (YIM Soon-rye, Korea)
  - Closing Film: This is My Moon (ASOKA Handagama, Sri Lanke)
  - Woosuk Award (Asia Indi Forum): Mysterious Object at Noon (Apichatpong WEERASETHAKUL, Thailand)
  - Daring Digital Award (N-Vision): About Pleasure and Hysteria-The Sexual Life of the Belgians, Part (Jan BUCQUOY, Belgium)
  - Jeonju Korean Shorts Award (Korean Short Films): Noonday (JANG Myung-sook, Korea)
  - Jeonju People’s Award (Cinemascape): Beijing Bicycle (WANG Xiao-Shuai, China, Taiwan)

=== 3rd Jeonju International Film Festival (2002) ===
- Apr 26 – May 2, 2002
- Number of Films: 266 films from 32 countries
  - Woosuk Award (Asian Newcomers): Brother (YAN Yan Mak, Hong Kong, China)
  - Daring Digital Award (Digital Spectrum): Angel Exit (Vladimír MICHALÉK, Czech)
  - JIFF Favorites Award (Cinemascape): Spirited Away (MIYAZAKI Hayao, Japan)

=== 4th Jeonju International Film Festival (2003) ===
- Apr 25 – May 4, 2003
- Number of Films: 184 films from 30 countries
  - Opening Film: If You Were Me (PARK Kwang-su, PARK Jin-pyo, YEO Kyung-dong, JEONG Jae-eun, PARK Chan-wook, YIM Soon-rye, Korea)
  - Closing Film: Far from Heaven (Todd Haynes, USA)
  - Woosuk Award (Asian Newcomers): Exam (Nasser REFAIE, Iran)
  - Daring Digital Award (Digital Spectrum): Half the Rent (Marc OTTIKER, Germany)
  - JIFF Favorites Award (Cinemascape): Spider (David Cronenberg, Canada)

=== 5th Jeonju International Film Festival (2004) ===
- Apr 23 – May 2, 2004
- Number of Films: 284 films from 30 countries
  - Opening Films: Possible Changes (MIN Byoung-kook, Korea)
  - Closing Films: November (Achero MAÑAS, Spain)
  - Woosuk Award (Indie Vision): Silence between two thoughts (Babak PAYAMI, Iran)
    - Special Mention (Woosuk Award): Min (HO Yu-hang, Malaysia)
  - Daring Digital Award (Digital Spectrum): Suite Havana (Fernando PÉREZ, Cuba)
    - Special Mention (Daring Digital Award): Sexual Dependency (Rodrigo BELLOTT, Bolivia, USA)
  - JIFF Favorites Award (Cinemascape): Coffee and Cigaret (Jim JAMUSH, USA)

=== 6th Jeonju International Film Festival (2005) ===
- Apr 28 – May 6, 2005
- Number of Films: 176 films from 31 countries
  - Opening Film: Jeonju Digital Project 2005 (SONG Il-gon, Apichatpong WEERASETHAKUL, TSUKAMOTO Shinya)
  - Closing Film: Antarctic Journal (YIM Pil-sung, Korea)
  - Woosuk Award (Indie Vision): Harvest Time (Marina RAZBEZKHINA, Russia)
    - Special Mention (Woosuk Award): I, Claudia (Chris Abraham, Canada)
  - JJ-Star Award (Digital Spectrum): Oxhide (LIU Jia-yin, China)
  - Audience Critics’ Award (Korean Cinema on the Move): The Gate of Truth (KIM Hee-chul, Korea)
    - Special Mention (Audience Critics’ Award): Five is Too Many (AHN Seong-ki, Korea)
  - JIFF Favorites Award (Cinemascape, Cinema Palace): The Butterfly (Philippe MUYL, France)

=== 7th Jeonju International Film Festival (2006) ===
- Apr 27 – May 5, 2006
- Number of Films: 194 films from 42 countries
  - Opening Film: Offside (Jafar, PANAJI, Iran)
  - Closing Film: Don’t Look Back (KIM Young-nam, Korea)
  - Woosuk Award (Indie Vision): Drifting States (Denis Côté, Canada)
    - Special Mention (Woosuk Award): Smiling in a War Zone – The Art of Flying to Kabul (Simone Aaberg KAERN, Denmark)
  - JJ-Star Award (Digital Spectrum): Stories from the North (Urupong RAKSASAD, Thailand)
    - Special mention (JJ-Star Award): White She-Camel, the (Xavier CHRISTIAENS, Belgium)
  - Audience Critics’ Award (Korean Cinema on the Move): Shocking Family (Kyungsoon, Korea)
  - CGV Korean Independent Feature Distribution (Korean Independent Feature Films): Between (LEE Chang-jae, Korea)
  - JIFF Favorites Award (Cinemascape, Cinema Palace): Veer-Zaara (Yash CHOPRA, India)

=== 8th Jeonju International Film Festival (2007) ===
- Apr 26 – May 4, 2007
- Number of Films: 185 films from 37 countries
  - Opening Film: Off Road (HAN Seung-ryong, Korea)
  - Closing Film: Exiled (Johnie TO, Hong Kong)
  - Woosuk Award (Indie Vision): The Other Half (YING Liang, China)
    - Special Mention (Woosuk Award): Salty Air (Alessandro ANGELINI, Italy)
  - JJ-Star Award (Korean Cinema on the Move): HERs (KIM Jeong-jung, Korea)
  - Audience Critics’ Award (Korean Cinema on the Move): Who’s That Knocking at My Door? (YANG Hea-hoon, Korea)
  - KT&G Sangsangmadang Award (Best Short Award) (Korean Short: Critics’ Week): Seongbuk Port (SHIN Min-jae, Korea)
  - KT&G Sangsangmadang Award (Best Director Award) (Korean Short: Critics’ Week): Seung-a (KIM Na-young, Korea)
  - KT&G Sangsangmadang Award (Special Jury Award) (Korean Short: Critics’ Week): Blood Simple (KIM Seung-hyun, Korea)
    - Special Mention (KT&G Sangsangmadang Award) (Korean Short: Critics’ Week): The Ten-minute Break (LEE Seong-tae, Korea) / The Whale in the West Sea (KIM Jae-won, Korea)
  - CGV Korean Independent Feature Distribution (Korean Independent Feature Films): Who’s That Knocking at My door? (YANG Hea-hoon, Korea)
  - NETPAC (Network for the Promotion of Asian Cinema) (Asian Feature Films): Summer Heat (Brillante MENDOZA, The Philippines)
  - JIFF Favorites Award (Cinemascape, Cinema Palace): When the Road Bends… Tales of a Gypsy Caravan (Jasmine DELLAL, USA)

=== 9th Jeonju International Film Festival (2008) ===
- May 1–9, 2008
- Number of Films: 195 films from 40 countries
  - Opening Film: The Kiss (MANDA Kunitoshi, Japan)
  - Closing Film: If You Were Me 4 (BANG Eun-jin, JEON Kye-soo, LEE Hyeon-seung, Kim Tae-yong, Korea)
  - Woosuk Award (Grand Prize) (International Competition): The Stolen Man (Matias PIÑEIRO, Argentina)
  - JJ-Star Award (Korean Cinema on the Move): Daytime Drinking (NOH Young-seok, Korea)
    - Special Mention (JJ-Star Award) (Korean Cinema on the Move): My Heart Is Not Broken Yet (Ahn Hae-ryong, Japan, Korea)
  - Audience Critics’ Award (Korean Cinema on the Move): Daytime Drinking (NOH Young-seok, Korea)
  - KT&G Sangsangmadang Award (Best Short Award) (Korean Short: Critics’ Week): Please, Stop the Train (HAN Ji-hye, Korea)
  - KT&G Sangsangmadang Award (Best Director Award) (Korean Short: Critics’ Week): Senbei Selling Girl (KIM Dong-myung, Korea)
  - KT&G Sangsangmadang Award (Special Jury Award) (Korean Short: Critics’ Week): Boys (YOON Sung-hyun, Korea)
    - Special Mention (KT&G Sangsangmadang Award): The Oxherding Pictures #4 “Catching the ox-Two Chinese quinces” (Lee Ji-sang, Korea)
  - CGV Korean Independent Feature Distribution (Korean Independent Feature Films): Action Boys (Jung Byung-gil, Korea)
  - NETPAC (Network for the Promotion of Asian Cinema) (Asian Feature Films): Children of God (YI Seung-jun, Korea)
  - JIFF Favorites Award (Cinemascape, Cinema Palace): Action Boys (Jung Byung-gil, Korea)

=== 10th Jeonju International Film Festival (2009) ===
- Apr 30 – May 8, 2009
- Number of Films: 200 films from 42 countries
  - Opening Film: Short! Short! Short! 2009 (KIM Sung-ho, Chegy, YANG Hea-hoon, YOON Seong-ho, LEE Song Hee-il, KIM Young-nam, KIM Eun-kyung, NAM Da-Jeung, CHOE Equan, KWON Jong-kwan, Korea)
  - Closing Film: Macahn (Uberto PASOLINI, UK)
  - Woosuk Award (Grand Prize) (International Competition): Imburnal (Sherad Anthony SANCHEZ, The Philippines)
  - DAUM Special Jury Prize (International Competition): Inland (Tariq TEQUIA, Algeria, France)
  - JJ-Star Award (Korean Feature Films Competition): Missing Person (LEE Seo, Korea)
    - Special Mention (JJ-Star Award) (Korean Feature Films Competition): Where is Ronny… (SIM Sang-kook, Korea)
  - Audience Critics’ Award (Korean Feature Films Competition): Bandhobi (Shin Dong-Il, Korea)
  - Eastar Jet Award (Grand Prize) (Korean Short Films Competition): Don’t Step Out of the House (JO Sung-hee, Korea)
  - KT&G Sangsangmadang Award (Best Director Award) (Korean Short Films Competition): The Death of a Newspaperman (KIM Eun-kyung, Korea)
  - KT&G Sangsangmadang Award (Special Jury Award) (Korean Short Films Competition): The Strange Voyage (KIM Bo-ra, Korea)
  - CGV Korean Independent Feature Distribution (Korean Independent Feature Films): Bandhobi (Shin Dong-Il, Korea)
  - NETPAC (Network for the Promotion of Asian Cinema) (Asian Feature Films): Imburnal (Sherad Anthony SANCHEZ, The Philippines)
  - JIFF Favorites Award (Cinemascape, Cinema Palace): School Days with a Pig (MAEDA Tetsu, JAPAN)

=== 11th Jeonju International Film Festival (2010) ===
- Apr 29 – May 7, 2010
- Number of Films: 208 films from 48 countries
  - Opening Film: Should’ve kissed (PARK Jin-oh, Korea)
  - Closing Film: To the Sea (Pedro González-RUBIO, Mexico)
  - Woosuk Award (Grand Prize) (International Competition): Susa (Rusudan PIRVELI, Georgia)
  - JB Bank Award (Special Jury Prize) (International Competition): Red Dragonflies (LIAO Jiekai, Singapore)
  - JJ-Star Award (Korean Feature Films Competition): Passerby #3 (SHIN Su-won, Korea)
  - Audience Critics’ Award (Korean Feature Films Competition): The Boy from Ipanema (Kim Kih-hoon, Korea)
  - Eastar Jet Award (Grand Prize) (Korean Short Films Competition): Frozen Land (KIM Tae-yong, Korea)
  - Best Director Award (Korean Short Films Competition): Hard-boiled Jesus (JUNG Young-heon, Korea)
  - Special Jury Award (Korean Short Films Competition): A Brand New Journey (KIM Hee-jin, Korea)
  - CGV Movie Collage Award (Korean Independent Feature Films): The Boy from Ipanema (Kim Kih-hoon, Korea)
  - NETPAC (Network for the Promotion of Asian Cinema) (Asian Feature Films): Clash (Pepe DIOKNO, The Philippines)
  - JIFF Audience Award (Cinemascape, Cinema Palace): Before the Full Moon (SEO She-chin, Korea)

=== 12th Jeonju International Film Festival (2011) ===
- Apr 28 – May 6, 2011
- Number of Films: 190 films from 38 countries
  - Opening Film: Nadar and Simin, A Separation (Asghar FARHADI, Iran)
  - Closing Film: Anyang, Paradise City (PARK Chan-kyong, Korea)
  - Woosuk Award (Grand Prize) (International Competition): Jean Gentil (Laura Amelia GUZMAN, Dominican Republic, Mexico, Germany)
  - JB Bank Award (Special Jury Prize) (International Competition): The Dream of Eleuteria (Remton Siega ZUASOLA, The Philippines)
  - JIFF Audience Award (International Competition): An Escalator in World Order (KIM Kyung-man, Korea)
  - JJ-Star Award (Grand Prize) (Korean Feature Films Competition): Anyang, Paradise City (PARK Chang-kyong, Korea)
  - Audience Critics’ Award (Korean Feature Films Competition): The Color of Pain (LEE Kang-hyun, Kore)
  - JIFF Audience Award (Korean Feature Films Competition): The True-taste Show (KIM Jae-hwan, Korea)
  - ZIP& Award (Grand Prize) (Korean Short Films Competition): Double Clutch (Ahn Gooc-jin, Korea)
  - Best Director Award (Korean Short Films Competition): Confession (YU Ji-young, Korea)
  - Special Jury Award (Korean Short Films Competition): Rough Education (JOE Seung-yeon, Korea)
  - Movie Collage Award (Korean Independent Films): Pong Ddol (O Muel, Korea)
  - Eastar Jet & NETPAC Award (Asian Feature Films): Single Man (HAO Jie, China)

=== 13th Jeonju International Film Festival (2012) ===
- Apr 26 – May 4, 2012
- Number of Films: 184 films from 42 countries
  - Opening Film: Sister (Ursula MEIER, France)
  - Closing Film: A Simple Life (Ann Hui, Hong Kong)
  - Woosuk Award (Grand Prize) (International Competition): Summer of Giacomo (Alessandro COMODIN, Italy, France, Belgium)
  - JB Bank Award (Special Jury Prize) (International Competition): Ex Press (Jet B. LEYCO, The Philippines)
  - JIFF Audience Award (International Competition): The River Used to Be a Man (Jan ZABEIL, Germany)
  - JJ-Star Award (Grand Prize) (Korean Film Competition): Sleepless Night (Jang Kun-jae, Korea)
  - Audience Critics’ Award (Korean Film Competition): Without Father (KIM Eung-su, Korea)
  - JIFF Audience Award (Korean Film Competition): Sleepless Night (Jang Kun-jae, Korea)
  - ZIP& Award (Grand Prize) (Korean Short Film Competition): Noodle Fish (KIM Jin-man, Korea)
  - Best Film Award (Korean Short Film Competition): The Arrival (SIN Yiee-soo, Korea) / Why Does Wind Blow (LEE Hang-jun, Korea)
  - CGV Movie Collage Award (Korean Independent Feature Films): PADAK (LEE Dae hee, Korea)
  - Netpac- Eastar Jet Award (Asian Feature Films): Florentina Hubaldo, CTE (Lav DIAZ, The Philippines)

=== 14th Jeonju International Film Festival (2013) ===
- Apr 25 – May 3, 2013
- Number of Films: 190 films from 46 countries
  - Opening Film: Foxfire (Laurent CANTET, France)
  - Closing Film: Wadjda (Haifaa AL MANSOUR, Saudi Arabia)
  - Grand Prize (International Film Competition): LOST PARADISE (Eve DEBOISE, France)
  - Best Picture Prize (International Film Competition): (TIE) REMAGES (OZAWA Masato, Japan) and MAMAY UMENG (BALTAZAR, Dwein, Philippines)
  - Special Jury Prize (International Film Competition): PRACTICAL GUIDE TO BELGRADE WITH SINGING AND CRYING (Bojan VULETIĆ, Serbia)
  - Grand Prize (Korean Film Competition): DECEMBER (PARK Jeong-hoon, Korea)
  - Audience Critics Prize (Korean Film Competition): MY PLACE (PARK Moon-chil, Korea)
  - CGV Movie COLLAGE Prize (Korean Film Competition): Dear Dolphin (Kang Jin-a, Korea) / LEBANON EMOTION (JUNG Young-heon, Korea)
  - Grand Prize (Korean Short Film Competition): SWEET TEMPTATION (JEONG Han-jin, Korea)
  - Best Director Prize (Korean Short Film Competition): MASK AND MIRROR (MIN Byung-hun, Korea, France)
  - Special Jury Prize (Korean Short Film Competition): TWO GENTLEMEN (PARK Jae-ok, Korea)
  - NETPAC Prize (Asian Feature Film): FLASHBACK MEMORIES 3D (MATSUE Tetsuaki, Japan)

=== 15th Jeonju International Film Festival (2014) ===
- May 1–10, 2014
- Number of Films: 181 films from 44 countries
  - Opening Film: MAD SAD BAD (Ryoo Seung-wan, HAN Jiseung, KIM Taeyong, Korea)
  - Grand Prize (International Competition): History of Fear (Benjamín Naishtat, Argentina, France, Germany, Uruguay, Qatar)
  - Best Picture Award (International Competition): Coast Of Death (Lois Patiño, Spain)
  - Special Jury Award (International Competition): Hotel Nueva Isla (Irene GUTIÉRREZ, Javier LABRADOR, Cuba, Spain)
  - Grand Prize (Korean Competition): A Fresh Start (JANG Woojin, Korea)
  - CGV MovieCOLLAGE Award: Upcoming Project Support (Korean Competition): The Wicked (YOO Youngseon, Korea)
  - CGV MovieCOLLAGE Award: Distribution Support (Korean Competition): One For All, All For One (PARK Sayu, PARK Donsa, Korea, Japan)
  - Grand Prize (Korean Competition For Shorts): How Long Has That Door Been Open? (KIM Yuri, Korea)
  - Best Director Award (Korean Competition For Shorts): 12th Assistant Deacon (Jang Jae-hyun, Korea)
  - Special Jury Award (Korean Competition For Shorts): HOSANNA (NA Youngkil, Korea)
  - NETPAC Award (Non-Competition Sections): Tokyo Family (YAMADA Yoji, Japan)

=== 16th Jeonju International Film Festival (2015) ===
- April 30 – May 9, 2015
  - Opening Film: Partisan (Ariel Kleiman, Australia)
  - Grand Prize (International Competition): Poet on a Business Trip (Ju Anqi, China)
  - Best Picture Award (International Competition): Navajazo (Ricardo SILVA, Mexico)
  - Special Jury Award (International Competition): Parabellum (Lukas VALENTA RINNER, Argentina/Austria/Uruguay)
  - Special Mention Award (International Competition): Until I Lose My Breath (Leading Actress Esme MADRA, Turkey/Germany)
  - Grand Prize (Korean Competition): Alice in Earnestland (Ahn Gooc-jin, Korea)
  - CGV Arthouse Award: Distribution Support (Korean Competition): With or Without You (PARK Hyuckjee, Korea)
  - CGV Arthouse Award: Upcoming Project Support (Korean Competition): To be Sixteen (KIM Hyeonseung, Korea)
  - Special Mention Award (Korean Competition): Stay with Me (RHEE Jinwoo, Korea)
  - Grand Prize (Korean Competition For Shorts): Blossom (HAN Inmi, Korea)
  - Best Director Award (Korean Competition For Shorts): A Crevice of Violence (LIM Cheol, Korea)
  - Special Jury Award (Korean Competition For Shorts): A Lonely Bird (SEOJUNG Sinwoo, Korea)
  - NETPAC Award (Non-Competition Sections): Under the Sun (AHN Seulki, Korea)

=== 17th Jeonju International Film Festival (2016) ===
- April 28 – May 7, 2016
- Number of Films: 211 films from 45 countries
  - Opening Film: Born to Be Blue (Robert Budreau, Canada)
  - Grand Prize (International Competition): Sand Storm (Elite ZEXER, Israel)
  - Best Picture Award (International Competition) (sponsored by Woosuk University): Short Stay (Tedd FENDT, USA)
  - Special Jury Award (International Competition): The Wounded Angel (Emir BAIGAZIN; Kazakhstan, France, Germany)
  - Special Mention Award (International Competition): Dead Slow Ahead (Mauro HERCE, Spain, France)
  - Grand Prize (Korean Competition) (sponsored by Paekche Institute of the Arts): Our Love Story (LEE Hyunju, Korea) / Delta Boys (KO Bongsoo, Korea)
  - CGV Arthouse Award: Distribution Support (Korean Competition): Breathing Underwater (KOH Heeyoung, Korea)
  - CGV Arthouse Award: Upcoming Project Support (Korean Competition): Delta Boys (KO Bongsoo, Korea)
  - Special Mention Award (Korean Competition): Breathing Underwater (KOH Heeyoung, Korea)
  - Grand Prize (Korean Competition For Shorts) (sponsored by Kyobo Life Insurance Company): Summer Night (LEE Jiwon, Korea)
  - Best Director Award (Korean Competition For Shorts) (sponsored by DACC CARBON): Cyclical Night (PAIK Jongkwan, Korea)
  - Special Jury Award (Korean Competition For Shorts) (sponsored by DACC CARBON): Deer Flower (KIM Kangmin, Korea)
  - NETPAC Award (Non-Competition Sections): Spy Nation (CHOI Seungho, Korea)
  - Documentary Award (sponsored by Jin Motors): Spy Nation (CHOI Seungho, Korea)

=== 18th Jeonju International Film Festival (2017) ===
- April 27 – May 6, 2017
- Number of Films: 229 films from 58 countries
  - Opening Film: On Body and Soul (Ildikó Enyedi; Hungary)
  - Closing Film: Survival Family (Shinobu Yaguchi; Japan)
  - Grand Prize (International Competition): Rifle (Davi Pretto; Brazil)
  - Woosuk Award (International Competition): The Park (Damien MANIVEL; France)
  - Special Jury Prize (International Competition): In Between (Maysaloun Hamoud; Israel, France) / The Human Surge (Eduardo Williams; Argentina, Brazil, Portugal)
  - Grand Prize (Korean Competition): The Seeds of Violence (IM Taegyu; Korea)
  - CGV Arthouse Award: Distribution Support Prize (Korean Competition): The Seeds of Violence (IM Taegyu; Korea)
  - CGV Arthouse Award: Upcoming Project Support Prize (Korean Competition): Happy Bus Day (LEE Seungwon; Korea)
  - Grand Prize (Korean Competition For Shorts): Alone Together (BAE Gyung-heon; Korea)
  - Best Director Prize (Korean Competition For Shorts): Hye-Young (KIM Youngsam; Korea)
  - Special Jury Prize (Korean Competition For Shorts): Bomdong (CHAE Euiseok; Korea)
  - NETPAC Award: The Painter's View (KIM Heecheol; Korea)
  - Documentary Award: Blue Butterfly Effect (PARK Moonchil, Korea)
  - Daemyung Culture Wave Award: Loser’s Adventure (KO Bongsu, Korea)
  - Union Investment Partners Award (Best Directorial Debut): Saem (HWANG Gyuil, Korea)

=== 19th Jeonju International Film Festival (2018) ===
- May 3–12, 2019
- Number of Films: 246 films
  - Opening Film: Yakiniku Dragon (Jeong Ui-sin/Wishing CHONG; Japan)
  - Closing Film: Isle of Dogs (Wes Anderson; USA, Germany)
  - Grand Prize (International Competition): The Heiresses (Marcelo Martinessi; Paraguay)
  - Best Picture Award (International Competition): Distant Constellation (Shevaun Mizrahi; USA, Turkey, Netherlands)
  - Special Jury Award (International Competition): The Return (Malene Choi Jensen; Denmark, Korea)
  - Grand Prize (Korean Competition): The Land of Seonghye (Jung Hyungsuk; Korea)
  - CGV Arthouse Award: Distribution Support Prize (Korean Competition): Dreamer (Cho Sungbin; Korea)
  - CGV Arthouse Award: Upcoming Project Support Prize (Korean Competition): Back From the Beat (Choi Changhwan; Korea)
  - Grand Prize (Korean Competition For Shorts): Dong-a (Kwon Yeji; Korea)
  - Best Director Prize (Korean Competition For Shorts): Refund (Song Yejin; Korea)
  - Special Jury Prize (Korean Competition For Shorts): Apocalypse Runner (Cho Hyunmin; Korea)
  - NETPAC Award (Non-Competition Sections): Adulthood (Kim Inseon; Korea)
  - Documentary Award (sponsored by Jin Motors): Land of Sorrow (Lee Johoon, Korea)
  - Union Award: Graduation (Hui Jiye, Korea)

=== 20th Jeonju International Film Festival (2019) ===
- May 2–11, 2019
- Number of Films: 275 films from 53 countries
  - Opening Film: Piranhas (Claudio Giovannesi; Italy)
  - Closing Film: Skin (Guy Nattiv; United States)
  - Grand Prize (International Competition): From Tomorrow On, I will (Ivan Markovic, Wu Linfeng; China, Germany, Serbia)
  - Best Picture Award (International Competition): Homing (Helvecio Marins Jr.; Brazil, Germany)
  - Special Jury Award (International Competition): Last Night I Saw You Smiling (Kavich Neang; Cambodia, France)
  - Grand Prize (Korean Competition) (sponsored by NH NongHyup): Scattered Night (Kim Sol, Lee Jihyoung; Korea)
  - Best Acting Prize (Korean Competition): Kwak Mingyu for Wave (Choi Changhwan; Korea) / Moon Seung-a for Scattered Night (Kim Sol, Lee Jihyoung; Korea)
  - Jury Special Mention (Korean Competition): Wave (Choi Changhwan; Korea)
  - CGV Arthouse Award: Distribution Support Prize (Korean Competition): The Sea of Itami Jun (Jung Dawoon; Korea)
  - CGV Arthouse Award: Upcoming Project Support Prize (Korean Competition): Move the Grave (Jeong Seung-o; Korea)
  - Grand Prize (KAFA Award) (Korean Competition For Shorts): Parterre (Lee Sangwhan; Korea)
  - Best Director Prize (Korean Competition For Shorts) (sponsored by Kyobo Life Insurance Company): Leo (Lee Deok-chan; Korea)
  - Special Jury Prize (Korean Competition For Shorts): Sick (Lee Woodong; Korea)
  - NETPAC Award (Non-Competition Sections): The Harvest (Misho Antadze; Korea)
  - Documentary Award (sponsored by Jin Motors): Rivercide: The Secret six (Kim Byeongki, Korea)

=== 21st Jeonju International Film Festival (2020) ===
- May 28 – June 6, 2020
- Number of Films: 180 films from 38 countries
- Awardees:
  - International Competition
  - Grand Prize: Damp Season (GAO Ming)
  - Best Picture Prize (Sponsored by NH NongHyup): One in a Thousand (Clarisa NAVAS)
  - Special Jury Prize: The Year of the Discovery (Luis López CARRASCO)
  - Special Mention: Two actors of Adam (Maryam TOUZANI), Lubna AZABAL as Abla, Nisrin ERRADI as Samia
  - Korean Competition
  - Grand Prize (wavve Award): Gull (KIM Mijo), Mom’s Song (SHIN Dongmin)
  - Best Acting Prize: Black Light (BAE Jongdae) Yeom Hye-ran, Dispatch; I Don’t Fire Myself (LEE Taegyeom) OH Jungse
  - CGV Arthouse Award: Homeless (LIM Seunghyeun)
  - Korean Competition for Shorts
  - Grand Prize (wavve Award): The End of the Universe (HAN Byunga)
  - Best Director Prize (Sponsored by Kyobo Life Insurance): Walking Backwards (BANG Sungjun)
  - Special Jury Prize: Each (KANG Jeongin), Expiration Date (YOO Joonmin)
  - Special Mention: The Thread (CHO Minjae, LEE Nayeon)
  - NETPAC Award: The Shepherdess and the Seven Songs (Pushpendra SINGH)
  - Documentary Award (Sponsored by Jin Motors): Comfort (Emmanuel Moonchil PARK)

=== 22nd Jeonju International Film Festival (2021) ===
- April 29 – May 8, 2021
- Number of Films: 194 films from 48 countries
  - Opening Film: Father (Srdan Golubović; Serbia)
  - Closing Film: Josep (Aurel; France, Belgium and Spain)
  - Awardees:
  - International Competition Grand Prize: Splinters (Natalia GARAYALDE)
  - Best Picture Prize (Sponsored by NH Nonghyup): Landscapes of Resistance (Marta POPIVODA)
  - Special Jury Prize: Friends and Strangers (James VAUGHAN)
  - Korean Competition Grand Prize Kim Min-young of the Report Card (LEE Jae-eun, LIM Jisun)
  - Best Actor Prize: Aloners (HONG Sung-eun), GONG Seung-yeon Not Out (LEE Jung-gon) JEONG Jaekwang
  - CGV Arthouse Award Upcoming Project Prize: Not Out (LEE Jung-gon)
  - CGV Arthouse Award Distribution Support Prize: Aloners (HONG Sung-eun)
  - Watcha's Pick: Feature Not Out (LEE Jung-gon)
  - Special Mention: Coming to you (BYUN Gyuri)
  - Korean Competition for Shorts Grand Prize: Vacation Event (CHOI Minyoung)
  - Best Director Prize (Sponsored by Kyobo Life Insurance): Without You (PARK Jaehyun)
  - Special Jury Prize: Wasteland (LEE Tack), A blue giant (NOH Gyeongmu)
  - Watcha's Pick: Short Wasteland (LEE Tack), Weed Fiction (CHO Eungil), Maria&Beyonce (SONG Yechan), Training Session (KIM Changbum), Vacation Event (CHOI Minyoung)
  - Special Award: Documentary Award (Sponsored by Jin Motors): Coming to you (BYUN Gyuri)
  - J Vision Award: Teacher´s Day (LEE Jihyang), Out of Season (HUH Gun)
  - NETPAC Award: JAZZ KISSA BASIE (HOSHINO Tetsuya)

=== 23rd Jeonju International Film Festival (2022) ===
- April 28 – May 7, 2022
- Number of Films: 217 films from 52 countries
- Jury: 14 judges in the competition section and NETPAC Awards, consisting of multinational directors, actors and programmers.
  - Opening Film: After Yang by Kogonada (United States, 2021)
  - Closing Film: Full Time (Éric Gravel; France 2021)
  - MCs: Jang Hyun-sung and Yoo In-na
  - Awardees:
  - International Competition Grand Prize: Geographies of Solitude (Jacquelyn Mills)
  - Best Picture Prize (Sponsored by NH Nonghyup): Unrest (Cyril Schäublin)
  - Special Jury Prize: Tokyo Kurds (Fumiari Hyuga) and The Silence of the Mole (Anaïs Taracena)
  - Korean Competition Grand Prize: Jeong-sun (Jeong Ji-hye)
  - Korean Competition for Shorts Special Jury Prize: Wunderkammer 10.0 (Yelim Ki, Soyun Park, Inwoo Jung)
  - Best Actor Prize (Sponsored by ONFIFN): Missing Yoon (Kim Jinhwa) OH Mine and Archaeology of love (Lee Wanmin) Ok Ja-yeon
  - CGV Arthouse Award Upcoming Project Prize: The Hill of Secrets (Lee Ji-eun)
  - CGV Arthouse Award Distribution Support Prize: Mother and Daughter (Kim Jung-eun)
  - Watcha's Pick: Feature: Mother and Daughter (Kim Jung-eun)
  - Special Mention: Archaeology of love (Lee Wanmin)

=== 24th Jeonju International Film Festival (2023) ===
- April 27 – May 6, 2023
- Number of Films: 247 films from 42 countries
  - Opening Film: Tori and Lokita by Jean-Pierre and Luc Dardenne (Belgium, France, 2022)
  - Closing Film: Where Would You Like to Go? (Kim Hee-jung; South Korea 2023)

=== 25th Jeonju International Film Festival (2024) ===
- May 1–10, 2024
- Number of Films: 232 films from 43 countries
  - Opening Film: All the Long Nights by Sho Miyake
  - Closing Film: Matt and Mara by Kazik Radwanski

Awards

- International Competition
  - Grand Prize: The Major Tones (Ingrid Pokropek)
  - Best Picture Prize (Sponsored by NH Nonghyup): Cu Li Never Cries (Phạm Ngọc Lân)
  - Special Jury Prize: Junkyard Dog (Jean-Baptiste Durand)
- Korean Competition
  - Grand Prize (Sponsored by FUJIFILM ELECTRONIC IMAGING KOREA): Time to Be Strong (Nam Koong Sun)
  - Best Actor Prize: Na Ae-jin Silver Apricot as Kim Jung-seo and Choi Sung-eun Time to Be Strong as Sumin
  - Distribution Support Prize (Sponsored by Jiwon): Blanket Wearer (Park Jeong-mi)
  - CGV Award: Sister Yujeong (Chung Haeil)
  - Watcha's Pick: Time to Be Strong (NAMKOONG Sun)
  - Special Mention: A Chronicle in Spirals (Kim Yiso)
- Korean Competition for Shorts
  - Grand Prize (Sponsored by FUJIFILM ELECTRONIC IMAGING KOREA): Farewell (Gong Seonjeong)
  - Best Director Prize (Sponsored by Kyobo Life Insurance): Hansel: Two School Skirts (Lim Jisun)
  - Special Jury Prize: Twilight (Park Syeyoung)
- Special Award
  - Documentary Award (Sponsored by Jin Motors): VOICES (Jee Hyewon)
  - J Vision Award: Unspoken (Oh Jae-wook)
  - NETPAC Award: Punch Drunk (Adel Tabrizi)
  - Cineteca Nacional México Award: Deprivation (Kim Solhae, Lee Dojin)

=== 26th Jeonju International Film Festival (2025) ===
- April 30–May 9, 2025
- Number of Films: 224 films from 57 countries
  - Opening Film: Kontinental '25 by Radu Jude
  - Closing Film: In the Land of Machines by Kim Okyong

Awards

- International Competition
  - Grand Prize: Mad Bills to Pay (or Destiny, dile que no soy malo) (Joel Alfonso Vargas)
  - Best Picture Prize (Sponsored by NH Nonghyup): Always (Deming Chen)
  - Special Jury Prize: Resistance Reels (Concha Barquero Artés, Alejandro Alvarado Jódar)
- Korean Competition
  - Grand Prize (Sponsored by FUJIFILM ELECTRONIC IMAGING KOREA): Winter Light (Cho Hyun-suh)
  - Best Actor Prize: Son So-ra All Is Well, I Love You. and Kim Hyun-mok 3670
  - Distribution Support Prize (Sponsored by Jiwon): 3670 (Park Joon-ho)
  - CGV Award: 3670 (Park Joon-ho)
  - Watcha's Pick: 3670 (Park Joon-ho)
  - Nongshim Shinramyum Award: Summer's Camera (Divine Sung)
- Korean Competition for Shorts
  - Grand Prize (Sponsored by FUJIFILM ELECTRONIC IMAGING KOREA): mistletoe (Hwang Hyeonjee)
  - Best Director Prize (Sponsored by Kyobo Life Insurance): SLOWLY (Kim Haejin)
  - Special Jury Prize: A Pear Tree In The Star Village (Shin Yul)
- Special Award
  - Documentary Award (Sponsored by Jin Motors): Edhi Alice: REVERSE (Kim Ilrhan)
  - J Vision Award: The Burglars (Kim Taehwi)
  - NETPAC Award: Black Ox (Tsuta Tetsuichiro)
  - Cineteca Nacional México Award: Home Behind Bars (Cha Jeong-yoon)

=== 27th Jeonju International Film Festival (2026) ===
- April 29–May 8, 2026
- Number of Films: 237 films from 54 countries
  - Opening Film: Late Fame by Kent Jones
  - Closing Film: The Longest Night: Namtaeryeong by Kim Hyun-ji

Awards

- International Competition
  - Grand Prize: The Night Is Fading Away (Ezequiel Salinas, Ramiro Sonzini)
  - Best Picture Prize (Sponsored by NH Nonghyup): Chronovisor (Jack Auen, Kevin Walker)
  - Special Jury Prize: The Visitor (Vytautas Katkus)
  - Special Mention: Michiyuki - Voices of Time (Nakao Hiromichi)
- Korean Competition
  - Grand Prize (Sponsored by FUJIFILM ELECTRONIC IMAGING KOREA): The Summer That Slipped Away (Lee Seonyeon)
  - Best Actor Prize: Ki Jinwoo Insomnia and Yeo Daehyun Living Through the Same Season
  - Special Jury Prize (Sponsored by MALGNSOFT): Karma (Kim Myunwoo)
  - CGV Award: Living Through the Same Season (Goh Seng-hyeon)
  - Nongshim Shinramyum Award: Water Deer (Yu Soyoung)
- Korean Competition for Shorts
  - Grand Prize (Sponsored by FUJIFILM ELECTRONIC IMAGING KOREA): Touch, took (Tae Jiwon)
  - Best Director Prize (Sponsored by Kyobo Life Insurance): Memil (Kim Jungmin)
  - Special Jury Prize: Sales log (Kang Mina)
  - Aero K Award: Post poo drop (Kang Seungho) and Whale Hunting (Ryu Dohyeon)
- Special Award
  - Documentary Award (Sponsored by Jin Motors): Karma (Kim Myunwoo)
  - J Vision Award: The Yearbook: Waiting for the Teacher (Kim Jongkwan)
  - NETPAC Award: Numb (Uchiyama Takuya)
  - Cineteca Nacional México Award: Halo (Roh Youngwan)
  - FUJIFILM KOREA Award: Dark Beginnings (Mun Jeonghyun)

== Jeonju Digital Project and Jeonju Cinema Project ==
From 2000 to 2013, JIFF's Jeonju Digital Project (JDP) bestowed ₩50,000,000 each year to three directors to fund their short films. In 2014, JDP increased its total budget to ₩180,000,000 to produce three feature films. In 2015, JDP was renamed to Jeonju Cinema Project (JCP), and the budget was further increased to ₩300,000,000.

=== Jeonju Digital Project 2000 ===
The Jeonju International Film Festival presents Short Digital Films by Three Filmmakers (PARK Kwang-Su, ZHANG Yuan, and KIM Yun-Tae) in conversation with each other about their various interpretations of the digital film medium.

The filmmakers were given three conditions: to make a film in digital format, no longer than 30 minutes, and using a limited production budget. The three films construct one feature-length film entitled N, representing Next Generation, New Technology and Networking which are the common themes. Projects like Short Digital Films by Three Filmmakers, which focus on film production, creativity, and interactive technology, reflect the spirit of JIFF as they explore the zeitgeist of contemporary film.

- Film List
  - www.whitelover.com (PARK Kwang-Su, Korea)
  - Dal Segno (KIM Yun-Tae, Korea)
  - Jin Xing Files (ZHANG Yuan, Korea)

=== Jeonju Digital Project 2001 ===
JIFF attempts to open up new aesthetics for digital films as well as their functional efficiency. AKOMFRAH of England, JIA Zhang Ke of China, and TSAI Ming Liang of Taiwan, who have experimented in the genre of digital films, will show their works, these will be added to the list of digital masterpieces.

- Film List
  - In Public (JIA Zhang-ke, China)
  - Digitopia (John AKOMFRAH, UK)
  - Conversation with God, a (TSAI Ming Lia, Taiwan)

=== Jeonju Digital Project 2002 ===
Jeonju International Film Festival 2002 has selected 3 cineastes in Asia. The three men are: director MOON Seung-Wook from Korea, who gained international critical acclaim last year with his film (Nabi-Butterfly), director WANG Xiao-shuai from China, whose film (Beijing Bicycle) was shown in last year's festivals, and who has, through his many films, become the representative artist of the Chinese 6th generation filmmakers, and lastly, SUWA Nobuhiro from Japan, who has already achieved the status of maestro of the 21st century films in Japan.

- Film List
  - Survival Game (MOON Seung-wook, Korea)
  - The New Year (WANG Xiao-shuai, Korea)
  - A Letter From Hiroshima (SUWA Nobuhiro, Korea)

=== Jeonju Digital Project 2003 ===
Like previous years, JIFF presents ‘Digital Short Films by Three Filmmakers’, where three directors are invited to come together at Jeonju. This year's participants are young directors, AOYAMA Shinji, Bahman GHOBADI, PARK Ki-Yong. Japan's director AOYAMA Shinji has received worldwide acclaim by establishing his own cinematic traits beginning with his debut film. Iranian director Bahman GHOBADI has made his entrance into the arena of world directors with his film The Hours of the Drunken Horses (Zamani Baraye Masti Asbha). The Korean director, PARK Ki-yong, has opened new possibilities in digital films through Camel(s).

- Film List
  - Daf (Bahman GHOBADI, Korea)
  - Digital Search (PARK Ki-Yong, Korea)
  - Like a Desperado Under the Eaves (AOYAMA Shinji, Korea)

=== Jeonju Digital Project 2004 ===
- Film List
  - Mirrored Mind (ISHII Sogo, Korea)
  - Dance me to the End of Love (YU Lik-Wai, Korea)
  - Influenze (BONG Joon-ho, Korea)

=== Jeonju Digital Project 2005 ===
- Film List
  - Magician(s) (Song Il-gon, Korea)
  - Worldly Desires (Apichatpong Weerasethakul, Korea)
  - Haze (Shinya Tsukamoto, Korea)

=== Jeonju Digital Project 2006 ===
Instead of selecting directors from Korea, Japan, and China this year's “Digital Short Films by Three Filmmakers" section broadens its scope to other regions of Asia. The directors participating this year are as follows: Darezhan OMIRBAYEV, from Kazakhstan, who won the Un Certain Regard award at the 1998 Cannes Film Festival for his film Killer; Eric KHOO, from Singapore, who is starting to garner international attention after his film Be With Me was chosen as the opening film for Director's Fortnight at the Cannes Film Festival; and Pen-ek RATANARUANG, from Thailand, whose film Invisible Waves starring Korean actress KANG Hye-jung and Japanese actor Tadanobu ASANO was selected for competition at the 2006 Berlin Festival. The interlude segments will connect the three stories together and is directed by Chegy, the director of Fade into You.

- Film List
  - Twelve Twenty (Pen-ek RATANARUANG, Thailand)
  - About Love (Darezhan OMIRBAYEV, Korea)
  - No Day Off (Eric KHOO, Korea)

=== Jeonju Digital Project 2007 ===
Previously focused on Asian directors, Jeonju Digital Project 2007 takes a look at Europe. The Portuguese filmmaker Pedro COSTA, the German filmmaker Harun FAROCKI, and the French filmmaker Eugène GREEN participated in this project.

- Film List
  - Respite (Harun FAROCKI, Korea)
  - The Rabbit Hunters (Pedro COSTA, Korea)
  - Correspondences (Eugène GREEN, Korea)

=== Jeonju Digital Project 2008 ===
The three directors who participated this year are Idrissa OUEDRAOGO from Burkina Faso, who built his fame on (1990); Mahamat Saleh-HAROUN from Chad, who was introduced at Jeonju International Film Festival with his film after winning the Grand Special Jury Prize at the 2006 Venice International Film Festival; and Nacer KHEMIR from Tunisia, who continues to build his artistic world with cohesive subject matters, as in his film which won the Special Jury Prize at the Locarno International Film Festival.

- Film List
  - the Alphabet of My Mother (Nacer KHEMIR, Korea, France)
  - the Birthday (Idrissa OUEDRAOGO, Korea)
  - Expectations (Mahamat Saleh-HAROUN, Korea, France)

=== Jeonju Digital Project 2009 ===
- Film List
  - Butterflies Have No Memories (Lav DIAZ, Korea)
  - Koma (KAWASE Naomi, Korea)
  - Lost in the Mountains (Hong Sang-soo, Korea)

=== Jeonju Digital Project 2010 ===
This digital filmmaking project began with the start of JIFF in 2000 and has become a key project for the festival. JIFF bestows 50 million KRW for production of a digital film over 30 minutes to each director. In 2010, James BENNING, a master of US experimental/independent films, Canadian independent filmmaker Denis CÔTÉ, and Argentina's rising star Matías PIÑEIRO have participated in the project.

- Film List
  - Rosalind (Matías PIÑEIRO, Korea)
  - Pig Iron (James BENNING, Korea)
  - The Enemy Lines (Denis CÔTÉ, Korea)

=== Jeonju Digital Project 2011 ===
JIFF plans and releases Jeonju Digital Project every year to support creative artists who explore film aesthetics and its future. Since its inception, JIFF has given much thought to the possibility of digital films. Jeonju Digital Project has been screened in Venice, Toronto, Locarno, Torino, Vancouver, Vienna, Hong Kong, Argentina, etc. During the 2006 Locarno Film Festival, a special exhibition was held under the title of ―Digital Asia where all of the Jeonju Digital Project works were presented, and in 2007, one of the project's productions (Pedro COSTA, Eugène GREEN, Harun FAROCKI) won the Special Jury Prize at the Locarno Film Festival International Competition section. And by Mahamat-Saleh HAROUN, one of the Jeonju Digital Projects in 2008, also received Special Jury Award in Africa-Asia Short Film Competition at Dubai International Film Festival.

- Film List
  - To The Devil (Clair DENIS, Korea)
  - Memories of a Morning (José Luis GUERĺN, Korea)
  - An Heir (Jean-Marie STRAUB, Korea)

=== Jeonju Digital Project 2012 ===
- Film List
  - The Great Cinema Party (Raya MARTIN, Korea)
  - Light in the Yellow Breathing Space (Vimukthi JAYASUNDARA, Korea)
  - When Night Falls (YING Liang, Korea)

=== Jeonju Digital Project 2013 ===
- Film List
  - Someone's Wife in the Boat of Someone's Husband (Edwin; Korea, Indonesia)
  - Strangers When We Meet (Masahiro Kobayashi; Korea, Japan)
  - Over There (Zhang Lu; Korea)

=== Jeonju Digital Project 2014 ===
- Film List
  - Free Fall (György PÁLFI, Korea, Hungary)
  - The Avian Kind (Shin Yeon-shick, Korea)
  - Alive (Park Jung-bum, Korea)

=== Jeonju Cinema Project 2015 ===
- Film List
  - El Movimiento (Benjamín Naishtat; Argentina, Korea)
  - Snow Paths (KIM Heejung; Korea)
  - Samnye (LEE Hyun-jung; Korea)

=== Jeonju Cinema Project 2016 ===
- Film List
  - A Decent Woman (Lukas Valenta RINNER; Argentina, South Korea, Austria)
  - Great Patrioteers (KIM Soo-hyun; South Korea)
  - A Stray Goat (CHO Jae-min; South Korea)

=== Jeonju Cinema Project 2017 ===
- Film List
  - Our President (LEE Chang-jae; South Korea)
  - The First Lap (KIM Dae-hwan; South Korea)
  - The Poet and the Boy (KIM Yang-hee; Korea)

=== Jeonju Cinema Project 2018 ===
- Film List
  - The Play (Alejandro Fernández Almendras; Chile, Czech Republic, France, South Korea)
  - Nona. If They Soak Me, I’ll Burn Them (Camila José DONOSO; Chile, Brazil, France, South Korea)
  - A Good Business (LEE Hark Joon; Korea)
  - The Winter Night (JANG Woo-jin; Korea)
  - The Land on the Waves (LIM Taegue; Korea)

=== Jeonju Cinema Project 2019 ===
- Film List
  - Somewhere in Between (JEON Jeehee; South Korea)
  - the Breathing of the fire (KO Hee-young; South Korea)
  - Isadora's Children (Damien MANIVEL; France, South Korea)
  - Shades of the Heart (Kim Jong-kwan; South Korea)

== See also ==
- List of festivals in South Korea
- List of festivals in Asia
