= My Heart Is Not Broken Yet =

- Theatrical poster
- Hangul: 나의 마음은 지지 않았다
- RR: Naui maeumeun jiji anatda
- MR: Naŭi maŭmŭn chiji anatta
- Directed by: Ahn Hae-ryong
- Produced by: Yang Jing-ja
- Starring: Song Sin-do
- Cinematography: Park Jeong-sik; Yang Jing-ja; Ahn Hae-ryong
- Music by: Pak Poe
- Distributed by: Indiestory Inc.
- Release date: August 2007 (Japan)
- Running time: 95 minutes
- Country: South Korea
- Language: Korean

My Heart Is Not Broken Yet (Korean: 나의 마음은 지지 않았다; RR: Naui maeumeun jiji anatda) is a 2007 South Korean documentary film which tells the story of a former comfort woman, Song Sin-do, who filed a lawsuit against the Japanese government to seek redress for the comfort women who were drafted into sexual slavery for the Japanese troops during World War II. Although the court dismissed the case after a decade-long battle, Song firmly stands, defiant of the ruling: "My case may have been broken in court. But my heart is not broken yet." It was first released in Japan in August 2007.

It won JJ-Star Award's Special Mention at the 9th Jeonju International Film Festival in 2008.

== Cast ==
- Song Sin-do as Herself
- Moon So-ri as the narrator

== Awards and nominations ==
Year	Award	Category	Recipient	Result
2008	9th Jeonju International Film Festival	JJ-Star Award - Special Mention	My Heart Is Not Broken Yet	Won
