= Kim Kih-hoon =

South Korean filmmaker (born 1975)

- Born: 1975 (age 50–51); Busan, South Korea
- Occupations: Film director, screenwriter

Korean name
- Hangul: 김기훈
- RR: Gim Gihun
- MR: Kim Kihun

Kim Kih-hoon (Korean: 김기훈; born 1975) is a South Korean film director and screenwriter. Kim's first theatrical film The Mode of Disappearance (2005), tells the story of a man who one day finds his face has changed unrecognizably. The film debuted at the Busan International Film Festival and was invited to other major short film festivals including the Clermont-Ferrand International Short Film Festival in France where it was highly received. His directorial feature debut The Boy from Ipanema (2010), won the Audience Critic's Award and Movie Collage Award at the 11th Jeonju International Film Festival in 2010. Currently working on his latest work Trot (2015), it will star Ahn Sung-ki and Joo Sang-wook.

== Filmography ==
- The Mode of Disappearance (short film, 2005) - director, screenwriter
- The Way of Calling Nietzsche (documentary short, 2006) - director, screenwriter, producer, cinematographer, editor
- The Boy from Ipanema (2010) - director, screenwriter, editor, executive producer, planner
- Trot (2015) - director
