= 18th Busan International Film Festival =

2013 edition of film festival

- Opening film: Vara: A Blessing
- Closing film: The Dinner
- Location: Busan, South Korea
- Founded: 1995
- Hosted by: Aaron Kwok; Kang Soo-yeon
- Festival date: October 3–12, 2013

Busan International Film Festival
- 19th 17th

The 18th Busan International Film Festival was held from October 3 to October 12, 2013 and was hosted by Aaron Kwok and Kang Soo-yeon.

The 10-day festival attracted 217,865 people despite the organizers having been forced to reschedule some events due to a typhoon. Upcoming filmmakers from South Korea and Mongolia won $30,000 for the New Currents Awards. Over 299 films from 70 countries were screened, with 94 world premieres and 40 international premieres. The event opened with Bhutanese film Vara: A Blessing and closed with the South Korean film The Dinner.

== Program ==
† World premiere
†† International premiere
Award winner

=== Opening Film ===
English title	Original title	Director(s)	Production country/countries	
Vara: A Blessing		Khyentse Norbu	Bhutan	†

=== Gala Presentation ===
English title	Original title	Director(s)	Production country/countries	
Ana Arabia		Amos Gitai	Israel; France	††
Kadal		Mani Ratnam	India	
Nagima		Zhanna Issabayeva	Kazakhstan	†
Snowpiercer	설국열차	Bong Joon-ho	South Korea; Czech Republic	
Unforgiven	許されざる者	Lee Sang-il	Japan	
The X	더 엑스	Kim Jee-woon	South Korea	†

=== A Window on Asian Cinema ===
English title	Original title	Director(s)	Production country/countries	
A Time in Quchi	暑假作業	Chang Tso-chi	Taiwan	††
A Touch of Sin	天注定; Tiān zhùdìng	Jia Zhangke	China; Japan	
Anatomy of a Paperclip	山守クリップ工場の辺り; Yamamori clip koujou no atari	Akira Ikeda	Japan	
The Backwater	共喰い; Tomogui	Shinji Aoyama	Japan	
Bends	過界	Flora Lau	Hong Kong, China	
The Book		Yerbol Zhumagulov	Kazakhstan	†
Ceylon	Inam	Santosh Sivan	India	†
Closed Curtain	پرده; Pardeh	Jafar Panahi; Kambuzia Partovi	Iran	
The Constructors	Stroiteli	Adilkhan Yerzhanov	Kazakhstan	††
David		Bejoy Nambiar	India	
Dawn of a Filmmaker: The Keisuke Kinoshita Story	はじまりのみち; Hajimari no Michi	Keiichi Hara	Japan	††
Death March	Martsang kamatayan	Adolfo Alix, Jr.	Philippines	††
Einstein and Einstein	狗十三	Cao Baoping	China	†
Fish & Cat	ماهی و گربه; Mahi va Gorbeh	Shahram Mokri	Iran	††
Harmony Lessons	Асланның сабақтары Уроки гармонии	Emir Baigazin	Kazakhstan; Germany; France	††
Homesick		Satoru Hirohara	Japan	††
If Only	Sana Dati	Jerrold Tarog	Philippines	††
Ikal Mayang : Telling Women Stories		Directors: Dira Abu Zahar (Jerat Suami); Sofia Jane Hisham (1-800-Baby); Vanida Imran (Pantang); Junaidah M. Nor (Odah); Melissa Saila (Berat Sebelah); Ida Nerina (She)	Malaysia	††
Ilo Ilo	爸媽不在家 (lit. Mom and Dad Are Not Home)	Anthony Chen	Singapore	††
Keening Woman	哭丧女; Ku Sang Nu	Rita Hui	Hong Kong, China	††
The Letter		Laxman Utekar	India	†
Letters from the South		Directors: Aditya Assarat (Now Now Now); Midi Z (Burial Clothes); Sun Koh (New New Panda); Royston Tan (Popiah); Tan Chui Mui (A Night in Malacca); Tsai Ming-liang (Walking on Water)	China; Malaysia; Thailand; Singapore; Myanmar	†
Like Father, Like Son	そして父になる; Soshite Chichi ni Naru	Hirokazu Kore-eda	Japan	†
The Lunchbox		Ritesh Batra	India	
Mary Is Happy, Mary Is Happy		Nawapol Thamrongrattanarit	Thailand	††
Mirror Without Reflection		Nosir Saidov	Tajikistan	†
Miss Zombie		Sabu	Japan	††
The Nightingale	夜莺 yèyīng	Philippe Muyl	China; France	†
Norte, the End of History	Norte, Hangganan ng Kasaysayan	Lav Diaz	Philippines	††
Omar	عمر	Hany Abu-Assad	Palestine	††
Once Upon a Time in Vietnam	Lửa Phật	Dustin Nguyen	Vietnam	††
One-Armed Swordsman	独臂刀; Dú Bì Dāo	Chang Cheh	Hong Kong, China	
The Painting Pool	حوض نقاشی; Hoze Naghashi	Maziar Miri	Iran	††
The Past	Le Passé, گذشته Gozašte	Asghar Farhadi	Iran	
Present for You 3D		Yoshihiko Dai	Japan	†
The Protest	Satyagraha	Prakash Jha	India	
Qissa		Anup Singh	India; Germany; Netherlands; France	†
Queen		Vikas Bahl	India	†
R100		Hitoshi Matsumoto	Japan	††
Real	リアル〜完全なる首長竜の日〜 Riaru: Kanzennaru Shuchō Ryū no Hi	Kiyoshi Kurosawa	Japan	
Sapi		Brillante Mendoza	Philippines	††
Soul	失魂; Shī hún	Chung Mong-hong	Taiwan	
Stray Dogs	郊遊; Les Chiens errants	Tsai Ming-liang	Taiwan; France	††
Striking Out in Love	ロマンス・ロード; Romansu Rodo	Shingo Matsumura	Japan	††
Summer's End	夏の終り; Natsu no Owari	Kazuyoshi Kumakiri	Japan	††
Taipei Factory		Directors: Singing Chen, Jero Yun (The Pig); Midi Z, Joana Preiss (Silent Asylum); Shen Ko-shang, Luis Cifuentes (A Nice Travel); Chang Jung-chi, Alireza Khatami (Mr Chang's New Address)	Taiwan	
Together		Saranyoo Jiralak	Thailand	††
Trapped	دربند; Darband	Parviz Shahbazi	Iran	
Twenty-Four Eyes	二十四の瞳; Nijū-shi no Hitomi	Sakae Tsuboi	Japan	
What They Don't Talk About When They Talk About Love	Yang Tidak Dibicarakan Ketika Membicarakan Cinta	Mouly Surya	Indonesia	
Why Don't You Play in Hell?	地獄でなぜ悪い; Jigoku de naze warui	Sion Sono	Japan	
Yellow Colt	Norte, Hangganan ng Kasaysayan	Khoroldorj Choijoovanchig	Mongolia	††
The Yellow Shallow Sky		Bahram Tavakoli	Iran	††

=== New Currents ===
English title	Original title	Director(s)	Production country/countries	
10 Minutes	10분; Sipbun	Lee Yong-seung	South Korea	†
Again	ゆるせない、逢いたい; Yurusenai Aita	Junichi Kanai	Japan	†
Concrete Clouds	ภวังค์รัก	Lee Chatametikool	Thailand; Hong Kong, China	†
The Isthmus		Sopawan Boonnimitra; Peerachai Kerdsint	Thailand	†
Jal		Girish Malik	India	†
Pascha	파스카	Seonkyoung Ahn	South Korea	†
Remote Control		Byamba Sakhya	Mongolia; Germany	†
Sarikend		Mehdi Parizad	Iran	†
Steel Cold Winter	소녀; Sonyeo (lit. 'Girl')	Choi Jin-sung	South Korea	†
The Story of an Old Woman		Alexey Gorlov	Kazakhstan	†
Toilet Blues		Dirmawan Hatta	Indonesia	†
Transit		Hannah Espia	Philippines	††

=== Korean Cinema Today – Panorama ===
English title	Original title	Director(s)	Production country/countries	
Abbi	애비	Jang Hyun-soo	South Korea	†
Another Family	또 하나의 약속; Ddo Hanaui Yaksok	Kim Tae-yun	South Korea	†
The Berlin File	베를린; Bereullin (lit. Berlin)	Ryoo Seung-wan	South Korea	
The Fake	사이비; Saibi	Yeon Sang-ho	South Korea	††
Fasten Your Seatbelt	롤러코스터; Rolleo Koseuteo (lit. 'Rollercoaster')	Ha Jung-woo	South Korea	†
Genome Hazard	ゲノムハザード 무명인; Mumyeongin (lit. 'Nameless')	Kim Sung-soo	South Korea; Japan	†
God's Eye View	시선; Sisun	Lee Jang-ho	South Korea	†
If You Were Me 6	여섯 개의 시선6; Yeoseot gae-ui siseon 6	Directors: Park Jung-bum (Dear Du-han); Shin A-ga; Lee Sang-cheol; Min Yong-keun	South Korea	†
Moebius	시선; Sisun	Kim Ki-duk	South Korea	†
My Boy	마이보이; Mai Boy	Jeon Kyu-hwan	South Korea	†
Nobody's Daughter Haewon	누구의 딸도 아닌 해원; Nugu-ui ttal-do anin Haewon	Hong Sang-soo	South Korea	
Our Sunhi	우리 선희; Uri Seonhui	Hong Sang-soo	†	
Rough Play	배우는 배우다; Baeuneun Baeuda (lit. 'An Actor Is an Actor')	Shin Yeon-shick	†	
Top Star	톱스타; Topseuta	Park Joong-hoon	South Korea	†

=== Korean Cinema Today – Vision ===
English title	Original title	Director(s)	Production country/countries	
Dynamite Man	다이너마이트맨	Jung Hyuk-won	South Korea	†
Godsend	신의 선물; Sinui Seonmul	Moon Si-hyun	South Korea	†
Guardian	보호자; Bohoja	Yoo Won-sang	South Korea	†
Han Gong-ju	한공주	Lee Su-jin	South Korea	†
Intruders	조난자들; Jonanjadeul	Noh Young-seok	South Korea	††
The King of Jokgu	족구왕; Jokguwang	Woo Moon-gi	South Korea	†
Mot	못 (lit. 'Pond')	Seo Ho-bin	South Korea	†
Shuttlecock		Lee Yu-bin	South Korea	†
The Stone	스톤	Cho Se-rae	South Korea	†
Thuy	안녕, 투이; Annyeong, Tui	Kim Jae-han	South Korea	†

=== Korean Cinema Retrospective ===
==== Fly High, Run Far: The Making of Korean Master Im Kwon-taek ====
English title	Director(s)	Production country/countries
Chunhyang	Im Kwon-taek	South Korea
Come Come Come Upward	Im Kwon-taek	South Korea
Fly High Run Far	Im Kwon-taek	South Korea
General's Son	Im Kwon-taek	South Korea
Mismatched Nose	Im Kwon-taek	South Korea
Seize the Precious Sword	Im Kwon-taek	South Korea
Seopyeonje	Im Kwon-taek	South Korea
Ticket	Im Kwon-taek	South Korea
Village in the Mist	Im Kwon-taek	South Korea

=== World Cinema ===
English title	Original title	Director(s)	Production country/countries	
3X3D		Directors: Jean-Luc Godard (Les Trois Désastres); Peter Greenaway (Just in time); Edgar Pêra (Cinesapiens)	Portugal	††
A Pact	Zum Geburtstag	Denis Dercourt	Germany; France	††
A Street in Palermo	Via Castellana Bandiera	Emma Dante	Italy; Switzerland; France	††
An Episode in the Life of an Iron Picker	Epizoda u životu berača željeza	Danis Tanović	Bosnia and Herzegovina; France; Slovenia	
Adele: Chapters 1 & 2	La Vie d'Adèle – Chapitres 1 & 2	Abdellatif Kechiche	France	††
All Is Lost		J. C. Chandor	United States	††
Arne's Legacy		Torsten Schmidt	Germany	††
Bastards	Les Salauds	Claire Denis	France; Germany	††
The Best Offer	La migliore offerta	Giuseppe Tornatore	Italy	
Big Bad Wolves	מי מפחד מהזאב הרע; Mi mefakhed mehaze'ev hara (lit. 'Who is scared of the bad wolf')	Aharon Keshales; Navot Papushado	††	
Borgman		Alex van Warmerdam	Netherlands; Belgium; Denmark	††
Child's Pose	Poziția copilului	Călin Peter Netzer	Romania	
Durban Poison		Andrew Worsdale	South Africa	††
End of Time	Endzeit	Sebastian Fritzsch	Germany	††
Family Tour		Liliana Torres	Spain	††
The Fifth Estate		Bill Condon	United States	††
Fruitvale Station		Ryan Coogler	United States	††
Gaming Instinct	Spieltrieb	Gregor Schnitzler	Germany	††
Gloria		Sebastián Lelio	Chile; Spain	
GriGris		Mahamat Saleh Haroun	France; Chad	††
Heli		Amat Escalante	Mexico; France; Germany; Netherlands	††
Honeymoon	Líbánky	Jan Hřebejk	Czech Republic; Slovenia	††
Ida		Paweł Pawlikowski	Poland; Denmark	††
In Hiding		Jan Kidawa-Błoński	Poland	†
Inside Llewyn Davis		Joel and Ethan Coen	United States; France	††
Intimate Parts	Интимные места	Natasha Merkulova; Alexey Chupov	Russia	††
It Was You Charlie		Emmanuel Shirinian	Canada	†
Jealousy	La Jalousie	Philippe Garrel	France	††
La Paz		Santiago Loza	Argentina	††
Le Grand Cahier	A nagy füzet	Janos Szasz	Hungary; Germany; France; Austria	††
L'intrepido		Gianni Amelio	Italy	††
My Sweet Pepper Land		Huner Saleem	France; Germany; Kurd	††
Mystery Road		Ivan Sen	Australia	††
Paradise: Hope	Paradies: Hoffnung	Ulrich Seidl	Austriay; Francey; Germany	
The Priest's Children	Svećenikova djeca	Vinko Brešan	Croatia; Serbia	††
Prince Avalanche		David Gordon Green	United States	††
Reality Show		Adam Rifkin	United States	††
Rock the Casbah	רוק בקסבה	Israel; France	††	
Sacro GRA		Gianfranco Rosi	Italy; France	††
Short Term 12		Destin Daniel Cretton	United States	††
Stand Clear of the Closing Doors		Sam Fleischner	United States	††
Story of My Death	Història de la meva mort	Albert Serra	Spain; France	††
The Strange Colour of Your Body's Tears	L'étrange couleur des larmes de ton corps	Hélène Cattet and Bruno Forzani	Belgium; France; Luxembourg	††
Stranger by the Lake	L'Inconnu du lac	Alain Guiraudie	France	††
Tom at the Farm	Tom à la ferme	Xavier Dolan	Canada; France	††
Ummah – Among Friends		Cuneyt Kaya	Germany	††
Vic+Flo Saw a Bear	Vic et Flo ont vu un ours	Denis Côté	Canada	††
Walesa. Man of Hope	Wałęsa. Człowiek z nadziei	Andrzej Wajda	Poland	††
When Evening Falls on Bucharest or Metabolism	Când se lasă seara peste București sau Metabolism	Corneliu Porumboiu	Romania; France	††
Workers		José Luis Valle	Mexico; Germany	††

=== Flash Forward ===
English title	Original title	Director(s)	Production country/countries	
Alienation		Milko Lazarov	Bulgaria	††
Apaches		Thierry de Peretti	France	††
Bad Hair	Pelo malo	Mariana Rondón	Venezuela	††
Bluebird		Lance Edmands	United States; Sweden	††
Canopy		Aaron Wilson	Australia; Singapore	††
Clydecynic		Ramiro Belanger	Canada	†
Delicious		Tammy Riley-Smith	United Kingdom	†
Dreamland		Petra Volpe	Switzerland; Germany	††
Drift		Benny Vandendriessche	Belgium	†
Good Night		Sean H. A. Gallagher	United States	††
Grand Central		Rebecca Zlotowski	France; Austria	††
Harrigan		Vince Woods	United Kingdom	††
Home		Maximilian Hult	Sweden; Iceland	†
Il Futuro		Alicia Scherson	Chile; Germany; Italy; Spain	††
The Impeccables		Ramin Matin	Turkey	†
Judas		Andrey Bogatyrev	Russia	††
La Jaula de Oro		Diego Quemada-Díez	Mexico	††
Metalhead	Málmhaus	Ragnar Bragason	Iceland; Norway	††
Miss and the Doctors		Axelle Ropert	France	††
Miss Violence		Alexandros Avranas	Greece	††
My Dog Killer	Môj pes Killer	Mira Fornay	Slovak Republic; Czech Republic	††
Not Another Happy Ending		John McKay	United Kingdom	††
The Referee	L'arbitro	Paolo Zucca	Italy; Argentina	††
The Reunion	Återträffen	Anna Odell	Sweden	††
The Rocket		Kim Mordaunt	Australia; Thailand	††
Salvo		Fabio Grassadonia; Antonio Piazza	Italy; France	††
Sarah Prefers to Run	Sarah préfère la course	Chloé Robichaud	Canada	††
The Sea		Stephen Brown	Ireland; United Kingdom	††
The Selfish Giant		Clio Barnard	United Kingdom	††
That Thing You Love		Alvaro Velarde	Peru; Argentina	†
Wild Duck		Yannis Sakaridis	Greece	††

=== Open Cinema ===
English title	Original title	Director(s)	Production country/countries	
Cold Eyes	감시자들; Gamsijadeul (lit. "Surveillance")	Cho Ui-seok	South Korea	
The Fly	Eega	S. S. Rajamouli	India	
I'll Follow You Down		Richie Mehta	Canada	††
Me, Myself and Mum	Les Garçons et Guillaume, à table !	Guillaume Gallienne	France; Belgium	††
Run Milkha Run	Bhaag Milkha Bhaag	Rakeysh Omprakash Mehra	India	
Silent Witness	全民目擊; Quán Mín Mù Jī	Fei Xing	China	††
The Terror Live	더 테러 라이브; Deo Tereo Raibeu)	Kim Byung-woo	South Korea	
Zone Pro Site: The Moveable Feast	總舖師 (lit. 'Bandoh master chef')	Chen Yu-hsun	Taiwan	††

=== Special Program in Focus ===
==== Rogues, Rebels and Romantics: A Season of Irish Cinema ====
English title	Director(s)	Production country/countries
The Crying Game	Neil Jordan	Ireland
Garage	Lenny Abrahamson	Ireland
The General	John Boorman	Ireland
In America	Jim Sheridan	Ireland
In the Name of the Father	Jim Sheridan	Ireland
Leo the Last	John Boorman	Ireland
Life's a Breeze	Lance Daly	Ireland
Love Eternal	Brendan Muldowney	Ireland
Michael Collins	Liam Neeson	Ireland
Once	John Carney	Ireland
The Stag	John Butler	Ireland

==== Unknown New Wave Central Asian Cinema ====
English title	Director(s)	Production country/countries	
Abdullajon or Dedicated to Steven Spielberg	Zulfiqor Musoqov	Uzbekistan	
Balkon	Kalykbek Salykov	Kazakhstan	
The Blessed Bukhara	Bako Sadykov	Tajikistan	
Poor People	Dzhahangir Kasymov	Uzbekistan	††
Presence	Talib Khamidov	Tajikistan	
Slow Sea, Fast River	Marat Sarulu	Kyrgyzstan	
Surzhekey – The Angel of Death	Damir Manabay	Kazakhstan	
The Wild East	Rashid Nugmanov	Kazakhstan	

==== Park Cheol-soo Special Commemoration: Eternal Movie Youth ====
English title	Director(s)	Production country/countries	
Farewell My Darling	Park Chul-soo	South Korea	
Green Chair 2013 – Love Conceptually	Park Chul-soo	South Korea	†
Mother	Park Chul-soo	South Korea	
Stray Dog	Park Chul-soo	South Korea	
Three-Oh-One, Three-Oh-Two	Park Chul-soo	South Korea	

=== Midnight Passion ===
English title	Original title	Director(s)	Production country/countries	
Afflicted		Derek Lee, Clif Prowse	Canada; United States	
Afterparty		Miguel Larraya	Spain	
Dawn of the Dead 3-D		George A. Romero	United States; South Korea	†
The Devil's Path	凶悪; Kyōaku	Kazuya Shiraishi	Japan	
Grand Piano		Eugenio Mira	Spain	††
The Keeper of Lost Causes	Kvinden i buret	Mikkel Nørgaard	Denmark	
Last Summer		Saranyoo Jiralak; Sittisiri Mongkolsiri; Kittithat Tangsirikit	Thailand	††
Life Deluxe	Snabba Cash: Livet Deluxe	Jens Jonsson	Sweden	††
Nothing Bad Can Happen	Tore tanzt	Katrin Gebbe	Germany	
Pee Mak	พี่มาก..พระโขนง; Phi Mak Phra Khanong	Banjong Pisanthanaku	Thailand	
The Returned	Retornados	Manuel Carballo	Spain	
Savaged	Avenged	Michael S. Ojeda	United States	

=== Wide Angle – Documentary Competition ===
- Gureombi –The Wind Is Blowing – Cho Sung-bong (South Korea)
- Dream House by the Border – Kim Kyang (South Korea)
- Jazz in Love – Baby Ruth Villarama (Philippines/Germany/France)
- Non-fiction Diary – Jung Yoon-suk (South Korea)
- Past Present – Tion Guan Saw (Malaysia)
- Tale of a Butcher Shop – Aya Hanabusa (Japan)
- To Singapore, with Love – Tan Pin Pin (Singapore)
- Sandal – Kim Mi-re (South Korea)
- Streetside – Daniel Ziv (Indonesia)

== Awards ==
- New Currents Award
  - Pascha – Ahn Seon-Kyoung (South Korea)
  - Remote Control – Byamba Sakhya (Mongolia/Germany)
  - Special Mention: Transit – Hannah Espia (Philippines)
- Sonje Award
  - A Lady Caddy Who Never Saw a Hole in One – Yosep Anggi Noen (Indonesia)
  - In the Summer – Son Tae-gyum (South Korea)
  - Special Mention: Temporary – Behzad Azadi (Iran)
  - Special Mention: Sprout – Yoon Ga-eun (Korea)
- BIFF Mecenat Award
  - Streetside – Daniel Ziv (Indonesia)
  - Non-fiction Diary – Jung Yoon-suk (South Korea)
  - Special Mention: Gureombi – The Wind Is Blowing – Cho Sung-bong (Korea)
- Busan Bank Award (Audience Award)
  - Home – Maximilian Hult (Sweden/Iceland)
- KNN Movie Award (Audience Award)
  - 10 Minutes – Lee Yong-seung (South Korea)
- FIPRESCI Award
  - 10 Minutes – Lee Yong-seung (South Korea)
- NETPAC Award
  - Shuttlecock – Lee Yu-bin (South Korea)
- Busan Cinephile Award
  - Father's Garden –The Love of My Parents – Peter Liechti (Switzerland)
- Citizen Reviewers' Award
  - Shuttlecock – Lee Yu-bin (South Korea)
  - Han Gong-ju – Lee Su-jin (South Korea)
- CGV Movie Collage Award
  - Han Gong-ju – Lee Su-jin (South Korea)
- The Asian Filmmaker of the Year – Rithy Panh (Cambodia)
- Korean Cinema Award – Charles Tesson (France)
