= Lee Su-jin (director) =

South Korean filmmaker (born 1977)

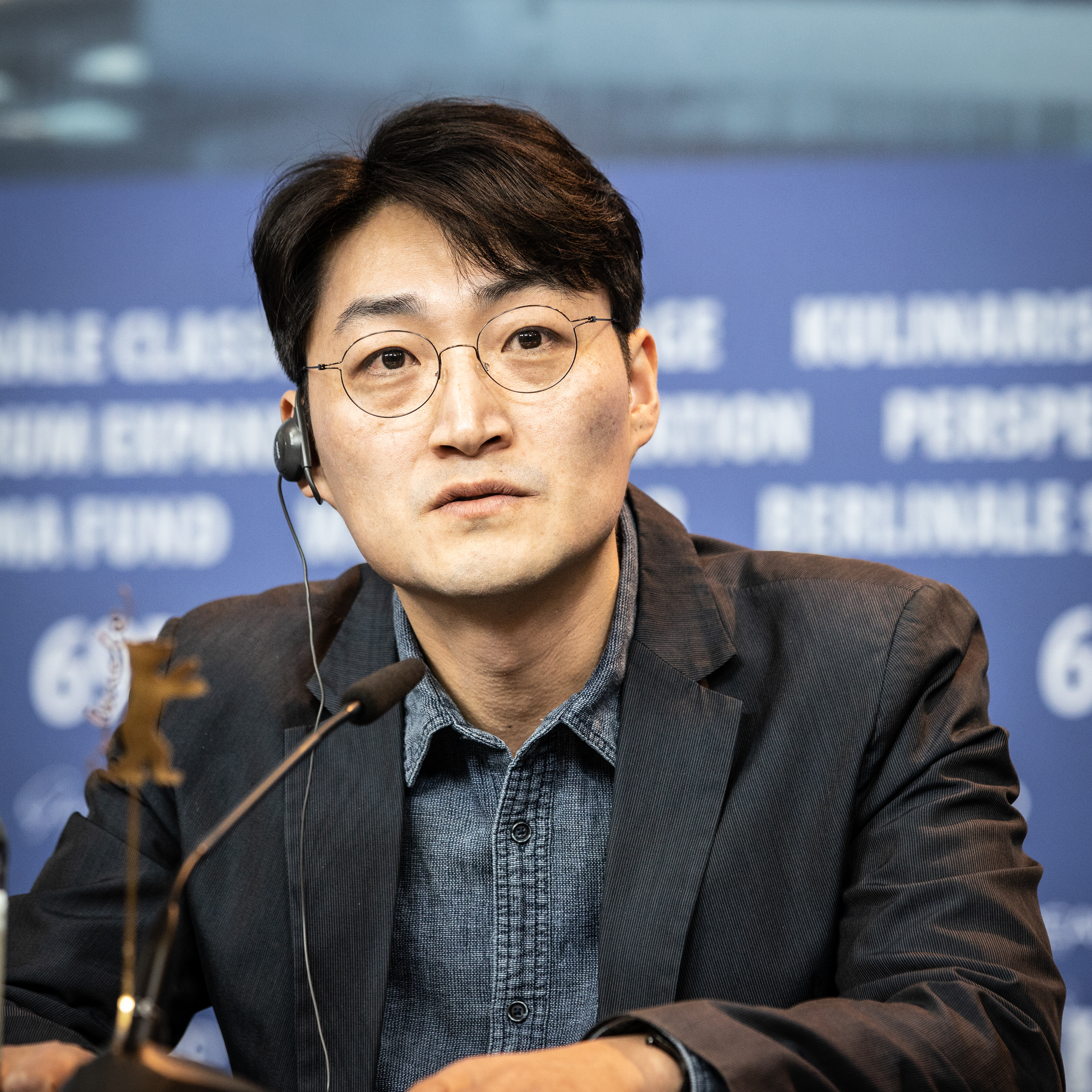
- Lee at the 2019 Berlin International Film Festival
- Born: 1977 (age 48–49); Gimcheon, South Korea
- Occupations: Film director, screenwriter
- Years active: 2002–present

Korean name
- Hangul: 이수진
- RR: I Sujin
- MR: I Sujin

Lee Su-jin (Korean: 이수진; born 1977) is a South Korean film director and screenwriter. His first feature was the award-winning Han Gong-ju (2014).

== Career ==
Lee Su-jin was born in Gimcheon in 1977. He began his filmmaking career directing short films, notably Papa (2004) which received a Korean Film Archive Award at the 30th Seoul Independent Film Festival, and Enemy's Apple (2007) which won Best Film in the A City of Sadness section of the 7th Mise-en-scène Short Film Festival.

Lee made his feature film directorial debut with Han Gong-ju, which he also wrote and produced. It premiered at the 18th Busan International Film Festival in 2013, where it received the CGV Movie Collage Award and the Citizen Reviewer's Award. Based on the infamous Miryang gang rape case in 2004, the film follows a traumatized, withdrawn teenage girl who is forced to change schools and move to a remote city after a horrific incident, who then attempts to rebuild her life and connect with others through music. Despite the subject, Lee said he "decided to focus more on the life of the victim after the crime rather than the crime itself" and that he "wanted to make a film about how a girl struggles to not let go of her hope" in order "to give courage to all the Han Gong-jus in the world who find themselves in the same situation." He said he cast breakout star Chun Woo-hee in the title role because he was struck by her sensitivity and intelligence, and "that she has a face that makes her look familiar." Han Gong-ju went on to more acclaim in the international film festival circuit, winning top prizes such as the Golden Star (Étoile d'or) at the 13th Marrakech International Film Festival, the Tiger Award at the 43rd International Film Festival Rotterdam, the Grand Prize (Regard d'or) at the 28th Fribourg International Film Festival, as well as the Jury Prize, Critics' Prize and Audience Award at the 16th Deauville Asian Film Festival. In 2014, Han Gong-ju was released on 226 screens in South Korea and drew 225,580 admissions, making it one of the most commercially successful Korean low-budget independent films. It received multiple domestic awards, including Best Film at the 6th KOFRA Film Awards and Grand Prize at the 2nd Wildflower Film Awards. Lee also won Best Independent Film Director at the 14th Director's Cut Awards, Best Screenplay at the 34th Korean Association of Film Critics Awards and Best New Director at the 35th Blue Dragon Film Awards.

== Filmography ==
- I Go I (short film, 2002) - director, screenwriter
- Lipstick (short film, 2003) - director, screenwriter
- Papa (short film, 2004) - director, screenwriter, cinematographer, editor
- Son's (short film, 2006) - director, screenwriter
- Sundays in August (2006) - assistant director, extra
- Enemy's Apple (short film, 2007) - director, screenwriter
- Happiness (2007) - directing department
- Han Gong-ju (2014) - director, screenwriter, producer
- Idol (2019) - director, screenwriter

== Awards ==
| Year | Award | Category | Recipient | Result | Ref |
|---|---|---|---|---|---|
| 2013 | 18th Busan International Film Festival | CGV Movie Collage Award | Han Gong-ju | Won | |
| 2013 | 18th Busan International Film Festival | Citizen Reviewers' Award | Han Gong-ju | Won | |
| 2013 | 13th Marrakech International Film Festival | Golden Star | Han Gong-ju | Won | |
| 2014 | 43rd International Film Festival Rotterdam | Tiger Award | Han Gong-ju | Won | |
| 2014 | 16th Deauville Asian Film Festival | Jury Prize | Han Gong-ju | Won | |
| 2014 | 16th Deauville Asian Film Festival | Critics' Prize | Han Gong-ju | Won | |
| 2014 | 16th Deauville Asian Film Festival | Audience Award | Han Gong-ju | Won | |
| 2014 | 18th Fantasia International Film Festival | Audience Award, Best Asian Film - Silver | Han Gong-ju | Won | |
| 2014 | 14th Director's Cut Awards | Best Independent Film Director | Han Gong-ju | Won | |
| 2014 | 23rd Buil Film Awards | Best Film | Han Gong-ju | Nominated | |
| 2014 | 23rd Buil Film Awards | Best New Director | Han Gong-ju | Nominated | |
| 2014 | 23rd Buil Film Awards | Best Screenplay | Han Gong-ju | Nominated | |
| 2014 | 34th Korean Association of Film Critics Awards | Best Screenplay | Han Gong-ju | Won | |
| 2014 | 34th Korean Association of Film Critics Awards | Critics' Top 10 | Han Gong-ju | Won | |
| 2014 | 51st Grand Bell Awards | Best New Director | Han Gong-ju | Nominated | |
| 2014 | 51st Grand Bell Awards | Best Screenplay | Han Gong-ju | Nominated | |
| 2014 | 35th Blue Dragon Film Awards | Best New Director | Han Gong-ju | Won | |
| 2014 | 35th Blue Dragon Film Awards | Best Screenplay | Han Gong-ju | Nominated | |
| 2015 | 6th KOFRA Film Awards | Best Film | Han Gong-ju | Won | |
| 2015 | 10th Max Movie Awards | Best Independent Film | Han Gong-ju | Won | |
| 2015 | 20th Chunsa Film Art Awards | Best New Director | Han Gong-ju | Nominated | |
| 2015 | 2nd Wildflower Film Awards | Grand Prize | Han Gong-ju | Won | |
| 2015 | 2nd Wildflower Film Awards | Best Director (Narrative Film) | Han Gong-ju | Nominated | |
| 2015 | 2nd Wildflower Film Awards | Best Screenplay | Han Gong-ju | Nominated | |
| 2015 | 2nd Wildflower Film Awards | Best New Director | Han Gong-ju | Nominated | |
| 2015 | 51st Baeksang Arts Awards | Best Film | Han Gong-ju | Nominated | |
| 2015 | 51st Baeksang Arts Awards | Best New Director | Han Gong-ju | Nominated | |
| 2015 | 51st Baeksang Arts Awards | Best Screenplay | Han Gong-ju | Nominated | |
| 2015 | 16th Jeonju International Film Festival | Moet&Chandon Rising Star Award | Han Gong-ju | Won | |
