= Ahn Jae-hong (actor) =

South Korean actor (born 1986)

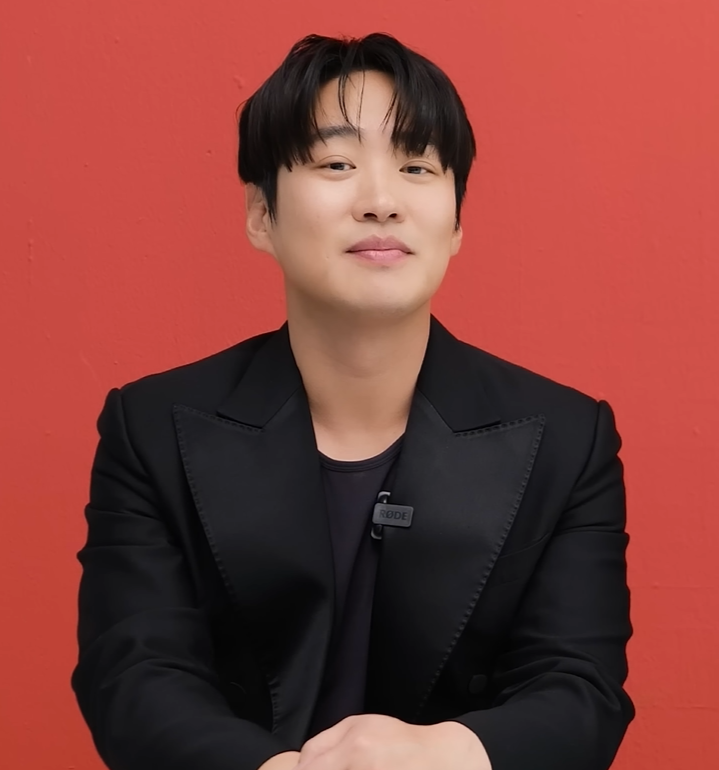
- Ahn in January 2024
- Born: March 31, 1986 (age 40); Haeundae District, Busan, South Korea
- Education: Konkuk University (Department of Film Studies)
- Occupation: Actor
- Years active: 2009–present
- Agent: Management MMM

Korean name
- Hangul: 안재홍
- Hanja: 安宰弘
- RR: An Jaehong
- MR: An Chaehong

Ahn Jae-hong (Korean: 안재홍; born March 31, 1986) is a South Korean actor. He made his professional acting debut in 2009 and is known for his work in both film and television. He first gained recognition through his roles in the films The King of Jokgu (2013) and Fabricated City (2017) and further achieved prominence for his performances in the television series Reply 1988 (2015–16), Fight for My Way (2017), Mask Girl (2023), and Chicken Nugget (2024).

== Early life and education ==
Ahn Jae-hong was born on March 31, 1986 and raised in U-dong, Haeundae District, Busan, as the youngest of two sons. Since childhood, Ahn liked watching movies and used to rent the latest releases. He applied to study film, but he did not know whether he wanted to pursue acting until college when he started making short films and performing in theater.

In 2005, he enrolled in the acting program at Konkuk University's Department of Film Studies. During his second year of college, Ahn was offered the leading role in the college's regular summer performance. He portrayed Jang Deok-bae in director Jang Jin's play Clumsy People. Ahn also continued directing and acting in short films while he was in college.

== Career ==
=== 2009–2012: Beginnings and breakthrough ===
After graduating, Ahn performed on stage at Daehangno and worked part-time at a movie theater. In his spare time, he wrote down his ideas and directed his own short films. In 2011, he was cast as Sungseon in director Son Na-mook's open-run production of Boeing Boeing, an adaptation of the French play of the same name. That same year, Ahn made his feature film debut with a minor role as a student in the drama film The Day He Arrives, which was written and directed by Hong Sang-soo. In 2012, Ahn starred in The Sunshine Boys, also known as 1999, Visit, which was the first production of Gwanghwamun Cinema. For his performance, Ahn was awarded the Korean Film Directors Guild Award for Best Actor, which he shared with co-stars Kim Chang-hwan and Shim Hee-seop.

In 2013, Ahn appeared in director Hong Sang-soo's Nobody's Daughter Haewon. That same year, he starred as Hong Man-seop in Gwanghwamun Cinema's independent sports comedy film The King of Jokgu, which featured the Korean sport jokgu. The film premiered at the 18th Busan International Film Festival and attracted over 40,000 viewers, breaking records for an indie comedy in Korea, and was one of the most well-received indie films of the year. For his performance, Ahn earned several nominations for Best New Actor at various film festivals and won the award at the Wildflower Film Awards and Director's Cut Awards. The following year, he participated as a staff member in director Hong Sang-soo's film Hill of Freedom.

=== 2015–present: Rising popularity ===
In 2015, Ahn was cast as Kim Jung-bong, Jung-hwan's older brother, in the television series Reply 1988. His acting received favorable reviews from viewers and Ahn was nicknamed "Bongvely", a combination of "Bong" from his character Jung-bong and "lovely", by the press.

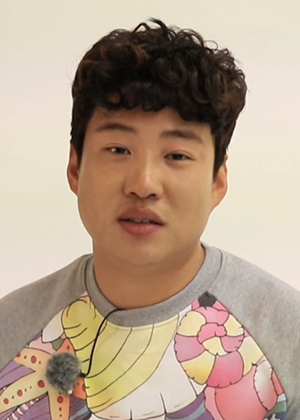
Ahn in March 2016

In January 2016, Ahn and Reply 1988 co-stars Ryu Jun-yeol, Ko Kyung-pyo, and Park Bo-gum were surprised by Na Yeong-seok and taken to Namibia and Zimbabwe to film the variety show Youth Over Flowers. That same year, Ahn made special appearances in two films and played supporting roles in three others. At the end of 2016, Ahn returned to the stage in the opening production of director Park Geun-hyung's play Ode to Youth at the Art Forest Art Hall in Daehangno. Ahn played the role of Cheong-chun, alternating the role with Kim Dong-won and Lee Jae-gyun. The play was performed from December 8 to February 12, 2017.

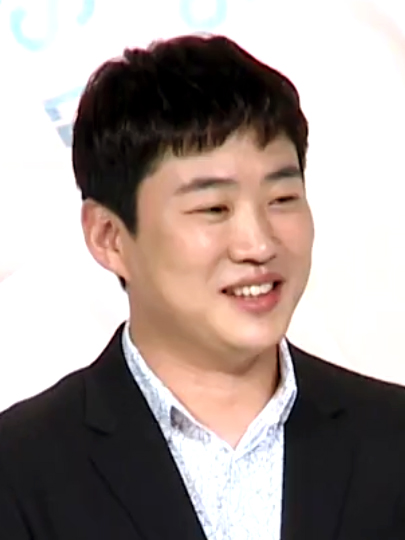
Ahn in May 2017

In 2017, Ahn played a supporting role in director Hong Sang-soo's On the Beach at Night Alone and starred in the television series Fight for My Way. That same year, he also starred in the period comedy film The King's Case Note and in Park Kwang-hyun's action thriller film Fabricated City. In 2018, Ahn took on the role of Han-sol, an aspiring online comic artist, in Gwanghamun Cinema's Microhabitat, starring with Esom. It is the debut feature film of director Jeon Go-woon. That same year, Ahn appeared in director Hong Sang-soo's Leaves of Grass. In 2019, Ahn starred in JTBC television series Be Melodramatic as the arrogant and famous director Son Beom-soo. His duet with his co-star Chun Woo-hee for the series' soundtrack was released on September 21, 2019. In 2021, Ahn was selected as the third 'Next Actor' of the 9th Muju Sangol Film Festival. Every year, the organizer selects a domestic actor with personality and high potential to focus on acting world. On December 1, 2021, Ahn signed a contract with Management MMM.

== Endorsements ==
Following his rise in popularity after Reply 1988, Ahn has been chosen as the face of various brands in South Korea. In 2015, he and fellow actor Lee Dong-hwi appeared in a Kia Motors' K5 promotional video, where they played their characters from Reply 1988. Ahn was also selected alongside Ryu Jun-yeol and Kim Seol as the models for Nongshim's Jjawang ramen commercial, where they portrayed their characters from Reply 1988. He and Ryu Jun-seol filmed a commercial for a telecommunications company with their on-screen mothers Ra Mi-ran and Kim Sung-Kyun.

In 2016, Ahn won the Best Advertising Model Award. In 2017, Ahn appeared in commercials for coffee brand Maxim Mocha Gold coffee, ice cream producer Baskin Robbins, part-time job portal Albamon, and delivery app Baedal Minjok. In 2018, Ahn was chosen as the main model for a Ford Motor's commercial aired in China. The contract was for a duration of two years.

== Personal life ==
In 2016, Ahn confirmed that he was dating a non-celebrity who was five years younger than him. They attended the same university and had already been together for two years when their relationship was announced. On September 18, 2019, a source from his agency confirmed that Ahn had broken up with his girlfriend.

== Filmography ==
=== Film ===
Year	Title	Role	Notes	Ref.
1996	Crocodile	Aeng-bal		
2009	A Perfect Sight		Short film	
2010	Chatter		Short film	
2011	The Day He Arrives	Student 1		
2012	The Sunshine Boys	Seung-joon		
2012	Happy Birthday to Me	Jae-hong	Short film	
2012	Lemon Time	Wook	Short film	
2013	Nobody's Daughter Haewon	Student 1		
2013	The King of Jokgu	Hong Man-seop		
2014	Tazza: The Hidden Card	Woondo		
2014	Red Carpet	Poongcha		
2014	Miss The Train	Tae-shik	Short film	
2014	Summer, Love, Illusion		Short film, director and writer	
2015	C'est si bon	Byung-chul		
2015	Twenty	In-gook		
2015	Coin Locker Girl	Police officer 2		
2015	The Sound of a Flower	Yong-bok		
2016	Queen of Walking	So Soon-yi	Voice appearance	
2016	The Queen of Crime	Student	Cameo	
2016	The Last Ride	Gap-deok		
2016	Familyhood	Deok-soo		
2016	Missing You	Detective Cha		
2017	On the Beach at Night Alone	Seung-hee		
2017	Fabricated City	Demolition		
2017	The King's Case Note	Yoon Yi-seo		
2017	Ladies Of the Forest		Short film	
2018	Grass	Hong-soo		
2018	Microhabitat	Han-sol		
2019	Miss & Mrs. Cops	Happy Balloons Boss	Cameo	
2020	Secret Zoo	Kang Tae-Soo		
2020	Time to Hunt	Jang-Ho		
2023	Rebound	Kang Yang-hyeon		
2025	Hi-Five	Ji-sung		
2026	The King's Warden			

=== Television series ===
Year	Title	Role	Notes	Ref.
2015–2016	Reply 1988	Kim Jeong-bong		
2016	The Legend of the Blue Sea	Thomas	Cameo (episode 2)	
2017	Fight for My Way	Kim Joo-man		
2019	Be Melodramatic	Son Bum-soo		
2020	Kingdom	Eunuch	Season 2	
2023	Mask Girl	Joo Oh-nam		
2024	LTNS	Samuel		
2024	Chicken Nugget	Ko Baek-joong		

=== Web series ===
Year	Title	Role	Notes	Ref.
2014	Prominent Woman	Jae-hong		
2014	Flirty Boy and Girl	Man #2 frugal		

=== Television shows ===
Year	Title	Role	Notes	Ref.
2016	Youth Over Flowers	Cast member		
2016	My Ear's Sweetheart / Candy In My Ears			
2020	Traveler	Cast member	Season 2	
2025–2026	Reply 1988 10th Anniversary	Cast member		

=== Music videos ===
Year	Title	Ref.
2025	"Hyehwa-dong (or Ssangmun-dong)"	

=== Music videos appearances ===
Music videos appearances
Year	Title	Artist(s)	Ref.
2014	"Her" (그녀) (Her, 사랑의 단상 Chapter 5. The Letter From Nowhere)	Epitone Project	
2014	"Let's get along, We" (잘 지내자, 우리) (사랑의 단상 Chapter 5. The Letter From Nowhere)	Dark (Zitten)	
2017	"Snow" (눈) (feat. Lee Moon-sae)	Zion.T	
2019	"August issue of Yoon Jong-shin 2019 monthly - It's going to be a breakup" (2019 월간 윤종신 8월호 - 이별하긴 하겠지) (With Kim Feel, Cheon Dan-bi)	Yoon Jong-shin	
2019	"September issue of Yoon Jong-shin 2019 monthly - Workaholic" (2019 월간 윤종신 9월호 - 워커홀릭) (With Ha Dong-kyun)	Yoon Jong-shin	

=== Hosting ===
Year	Title	Notes	Ref.
2024	Opening Ceremony of the 29th Busan International Film Festival	With Park Bo-young	

== Theater ==
Theater play performances of Ahn Jae-Hong
Year	Title		Role	Venue	Date	Ref.
Year	English	Korean	Role	Venue	Date	Ref.
2011	New Boeing Boeing	뉴 보잉보잉	Sun-seong	Daehakro Doore Hall 3	—N/a	
2016–2017	Ode to Youth	청춘예찬	Cheong-chun	Art Forest Art Hall	Dec 8 – Feb 12	

== Discography ==
List of singles, showing year released, and name of the album
Title	Year	Album
"Hyehwa-dong (or Ssangmun-dong) (혜화동 (혹은 쌍문동))" (Ssangmun-dong Kids featuring Ahn Jae-hong)	2025	Reply 1988 10th Anniversary OST

== Awards and nominations ==
Year	Award	Category	Nominated work	Result	Ref.
2012	17th Busan International Film Festival	DGK Award	The Sunshine Boys	Won	
2014	51st Grand Bell Awards	Best New Actor	The King of Jokgu	Nominated	
2014	35th Blue Dragon Film Awards	Best New Actor	The King of Jokgu	Nominated	
2015	10th Max Movie Awards	Best Actor	The King of Jokgu	Nominated	
2015	2nd Wildflower Film Awards	Best Actor	The King of Jokgu	Won	
2015	24th Buil Film Awards	Best New Actor	The King of Jokgu	Nominated	
2015	15th Director's Cut Awards	Best New Actor	The King of Jokgu	Won	
2016	52nd Baeksang Arts Awards	Best New Actor	Reply 1988	Nominated	
2016	9th Korea Drama Awards	Best New Actor	Reply 1988	Nominated	
2016	23rd Korea Advertising Awards	Top Advertising Model	—N/a	Won	
2017	Korean Film Shining Star Awards	Popularity Award	Fabricated City	Won	
2017	10th Korea Drama Awards	Excellence Award, Actor	Fight for My Way	Nominated	
2017	1st The Seoul Awards	Best Supporting Actor (Drama)	Fight for My Way	Nominated	
2017	31st KBS Drama Awards	Best New Actor	Fight for My Way	Won	
2017	31st KBS Drama Awards	Best Couple with Song Ha-yoon	Fight for My Way	Nominated	
2018	54th Baeksang Arts Awards	Best Supporting Actor (TV)	Fight for My Way	Nominated	
2023	Busan International Film Festival with Marie Claire Asia Star Awards	Beyond Cinema Award	Mask Girl	Won	
2023	59th Grand Bell Awards	Best Actor in a Series	Mask Girl	Nominated	
2024	22nd Director's Cut Awards	Best Actor in a Drama Series	Mask Girl	Won	
2024	60th Baeksang Arts Awards	Best Supporting Actor – Television	Mask Girl	Won	
2024	3rd Blue Dragon Series Awards	Best Supporting Actor	Mask Girl	Won	
2024	Asia Contents Awards & Global OTT Awards	Best Supporting Actor	Mask Girl	Won	
2025	34th Buil Film Awards	Best Actor	Hi-Five	Nominated	
