= Woo Moon-gi =

South Korean film director (born 1983)

- Born: 1983 (age 42–43); South Korea
- Education: Hongik University - Film and Video; Korea National University of Arts - Filmmaking
- Occupation: Film director

Korean name
- Hangul: 우문기
- RR: U Mungi
- MR: U Mun'gi

Woo Moon-gi (born 1983), is a South Korean film director. Woo's directorial feature debut, the indie sports comedy The King of Jokgu (2013), has won various awards, including Best New Director and Special Jury Prize at the 20th Chunsa Film Art Awards, and Best Independent Film Director at the 15th Director's Cut Awards.

== Career ==
Born in 1983, Woo studied Film and Video at Hongik University and is currently majoring in filmmaking at the Korea National University of Arts. He made a few shorts such as Between Hot and Cold (2008), Trembling (2009) and The Boy's Physics (2010). He also worked as assistant director on the film Modern Boy (2008) and as storyboard artist on Manshin: Ten Thousand Spirits (2014) and The Legacy (2014).

In 2013, Woo's directorial feature debut, the indie sports comedy The King of Jokgu (2013), made its world premiere at the 18th Busan International Film Festival. Released in 2014, the film was a sensation, attracting over 40,000 viewers, unheard of for an indie comedy in Korea. The film also picked up five nominations at the 2nd Wildflower Film Awards, winning Best Actor for Ahn Jae-hong.

== Filmography ==
- Between Hot and Cold (short film, 2008) - director, screenwriter
- Modern Boy (2008) - assistant director
- Trembling (short film, 2009) - director, screenwriter
- The Boy's Physics (short film, 2010) - director, screenwriter
- Mongoo Speaking (short film, 2012) - director, screenwriter
- Lost in Transportation (short film, 2012) - director, screenwriter
- The Sunshine Boys (2013) - art director
- The King of Jokgu (2013) - director, script editor
- Manshin: Ten Thousand Spirits (documentary, 2014) - storyboard artist
- The Legacy (2014) - storyboard artist, actor
- Woman, Man (segment: "Sad Scene") (2015) - director
- Collective Invention (2015) - actor
- Familyhood (2016) - screenwriter
- The Queen of Crime (2016) - actor

== Awards ==
- 2015 20th Chunsa Film Art Awards: Best New Director (The King of Jokgu)
- 2015 20th Chunsa Film Art Awards: Special Jury Prize (The King of Jokgu)
- 2015 15th Director's Cut Awards: Best Independent Film Director (The King of Jokgu)
