= Pentaport (Cheonan) =

Skyscraper in South Korea

The Pentaport Residence Tower or Asan SK Pentaport Residential Tower 2, commonly shortened to Pentaport (Korean: 펜타포트) is a skyscraper in Cheonan-si, South Korea whose construction was completed in 2008. Standing at 166m it is the tallest skyscraper in Chungcheongnam-do, 30th tallest skyscraper in Korea, and 274th tallest building in the world.

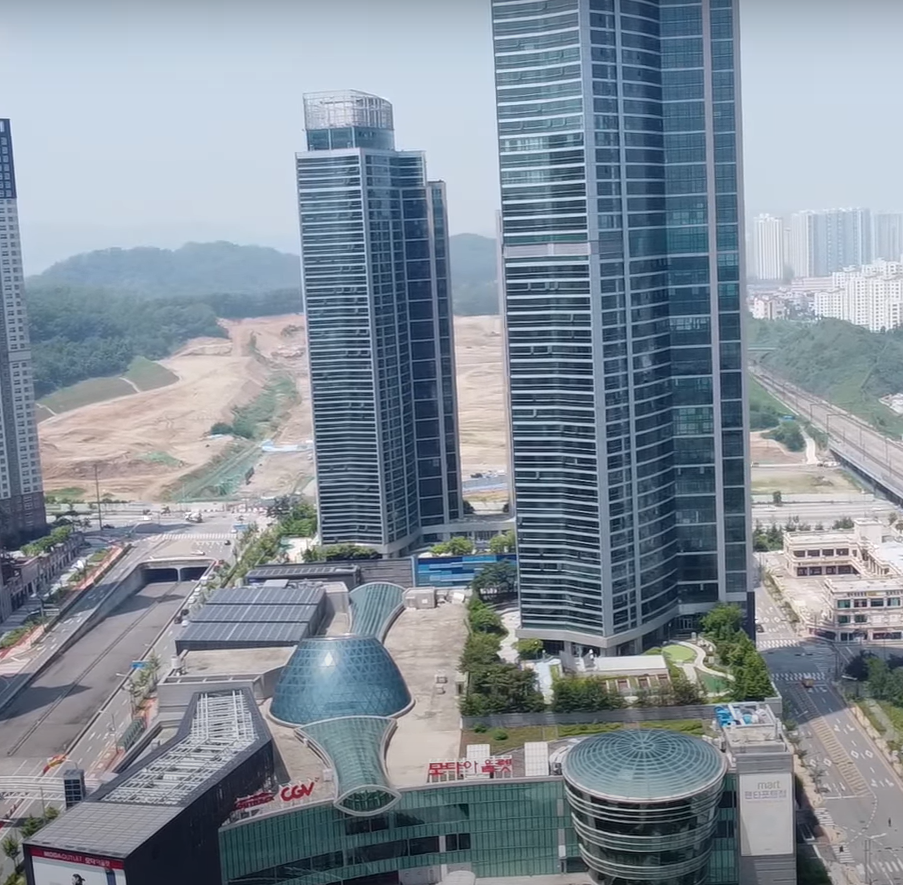

== Pentaport in media ==
It was seen in Fabricated City in 2017.
