= The King of Jokgu =

- Theatrical poster
- Directed by: Woo Moon-gi
- Written by: Kim Tae-gon
- Produced by: Kim Tae-gon
- Starring: Ahn Jae-hong; Hwang Seung-eon; Jung Woo-sik
- Cinematography: Lee keun-sol
- Edited by: Go Bong-gon
- Music by: Gwon Hyun-jung
- Production company: KwangHwaMoon Cinema
- Release dates: October 2013 (BIFF); August 21, 2014 (South Korea)
- Running time: 104 minutes
- Country: South Korea
- Language: Korean

The King of Jokgu (Korean: 족구왕; RR: Jokguwang) is a 2013 South Korean independent sports comedy film about Jokgu, a Korean cross between football and volleyball. A directorial feature debut by Woo Moon-gi, the film was a surprise hit, attracting over 40,000 viewers, unheard of for an indie comedy in Korea and was one of the most well-received indie films from 2014. It made its world premiere at the 18th Busan International Film Festival in 2013.

== Cast ==
- Ahn Jae-hong as Hong Man-seop
- Hwang Seung-eon as Seo Ahn-na
- Jung Woo-sik as Kang Min
- Kang Bong-sung as Park Chang-ho
- Hwang Mi-young as Lee Mi-rae
- Park Ho-san as Hyung Gook
- Ryu Hye-rin as Go Woon

== Awards and nominations ==
Year	Award	Category	Recipient	Result
2014	51st Grand Bell Awards	Best New Actor	Ahn Jae-hong	Nominated
2014	35th Blue Dragon Film Awards	Best New Actor	Ahn Jae-hong	Nominated
2014	35th Blue Dragon Film Awards	Best New Director	Woo Moon-gi	Nominated
2015	20th Chunsa Film Art Awards	Best New Director	Woo Moon-gi	Won
2015	20th Chunsa Film Art Awards	Special Jury Prize	Woo Moon-gi	Won
2015	2nd Wildflower Film Awards	Best Director (Narrative Films)	Woo Moon-gi	Nominated
2015	2nd Wildflower Film Awards	Best Actor	Ahn Jae-hong	Won
2015	2nd Wildflower Film Awards	Best Screenplay	Kim Tae-gon	Nominated
2015	2nd Wildflower Film Awards	Best New Director	Woo Moon-gi	Nominated
2015	2nd Wildflower Film Awards	Best New Actress	Hwang Seung-eon	Nominated
2015	15th Director's Cut Awards	Best New Actor	Ahn Jae-hong	Won
2015	15th Director's Cut Awards	Best Independent Film Director	Woo Moon-gi	Won
2015	24th Buil Film Awards	Best New Actor	Ahn Jae-hong	Nominated
2015	24th Buil Film Awards	Best New Director	Woo Moon-gi	Nominated
