= Anchor (film) =

2022 South Korean thriller film

- Theatrical release poster
- Hangul: 앵커
- RR: Aengkeo
- MR: Aengk'ŏ
- Directed by: Jung Ji-yeon
- Screenplay by: Jung Ji-yeon
- Starring: Chun Woo-hee; Shin Ha-kyun; Lee Hye-young
- Production companies: Insight Film; About Film
- Distributed by: Ace Maker Movie Works
- Release date: April 20, 2022
- Running time: 111 minutes
- Country: South Korea
- Language: Korean
- Box office: US$1.3 million

Anchor (Korean: 앵커) is a 2022 South Korean mystery-thriller film directed by Jung Ji-yeon. It stars Chun Woo-hee, Shin Ha-kyun and Lee Hye-young, and was released on April 20.

== Plot ==
Jung Se-ra is a highly competitive and ambitious newsanchor who lives with her domineering mother So-jeong. So-jeong pressures Se-ra to be a successful news anchor much like herself in the past during her glory days in front of the camera at the cost of Se-ra mental health and her relationship with her husband. Se-ra is separated from her estrange husband who is a hedge fund manager and keep pushing to get pregnant. At the station, she is threatened by a much younger and vibrant newcomer who threatens her position. Five minutes before a live broadcast, a woman calls her for help as someone is breaking into her home and prepares to murder both her and her daughter. Believing this to be a prank call since the woman calls her instead of the police, Sera ignores her pledge for help. However, Sera cannot hide her uneasy feelings, and her mother tells her that it is her chance to become a real anchor, Sera heads to the caller's house and witnesses the bodies of the caller, Mi-so, and her daughter. From that day on, Sera begins to see the dead Mi-so repeatedly. At the scene of the incident, she encounters psychiatrist In-ho (Shin Ha-kyun), who was Mi-so's attending physician, and Sera's suspicions about him deepen.

As Se-ra digs deeper into the case, In-ho reveals that Mi-so actually killed herself and her daughter and there was actually no stalker came to kill them. Mi-so suffers from personality disorder and was actually his patient. Due to her fragile mental state from witnessing the death of Mi-so, Se-ra unable to do her job properly and is replaced by a much younger anchor. So-jeong comes at the new anchor and forces her to get Se-ra position back but when she refuses, she stabs her. It is then revealed that Se-ra herself also suffers from personality disorder to the stress her mother put her. When Se-ra learns that she was pregnant, her mother ordered her to abort her grandchildren so Se-ra can focus more on her career. Se-ra also learns that her own mother career went downhill in the past because she tried to kill Se-ra as she chose her career over being a mother. Se-ra screamed at her mother to get out of her life, causing her guilt-ridden mother to hang herself. Se-ra was stricken with guilt and caused her to develop a second personality of that of her mother. She was the one that stab her replacement.

Se-ra is eventually arrest but collapses from the stress, rendering her into months' worth of coma. The movie ends with the doctor reveals that her baby is born and healthy.

== Cast ==
- Chun Woo-hee as Jung Se-ra, the main anchor of a broadcasting station.
- Shin Ha-kyun as Cho In-ho, a doctor and the spirit of a dead informant who leads Se-ra into greater chaos.
- Lee Hye-young as Lee So-jeong, Se-ra's mother who is obsessed with her daughter's main news anchor position.
- Cha Rae-hyung as Min Ki-tae
- Park Ji-hyun as Seo Seung-ah
- Nam Moon-cheol as head of the news agency
- Im Seong-jae as Detective Kim
- Kim Young-pil as Heo Ki-jeong
- Hae- Woon Hae as Reporter Han
- Jung Soon-won as PD Choi
- Park Se-hyun as Yoon Mi-so
- Seo Yi-soo as Yuna
- Kim Young-ah as Professor Han Young-ok
- Eun-sol as a female anchor

== Production ==
Casting was confirmed in September 2019 and filming began on November 9, 2019.

== A box office ==
Accumulated attendance of 164,911 and cumulative sales of KRW 1,613,962,610.
