= The King's Case Note =

- Hangul: 임금님의 사건수첩
- RR: Imgeumnimui sageon sucheop
- MR: Imgŭmnimŭi sakŏn such'ŏp
- Directed by: Moon Hyun-sung
- Screenplay by: Kang Hyeon-seong; Moon Hyun-sung; Jung Ui-mok; Han Jung-kook
- Based on: Imgeumnimui Sagunsoocheob by Heo Yoon-mi
- Produced by: Yoon Hong-joon; Choi A-rang; Yi Jin-hee
- Starring: Lee Sun-kyun; Ahn Jae-hong
- Cinematography: Kim Dong-young
- Edited by: Shin Min-kyung
- Music by: Kim Tae-seong
- Production companies: The Tower Pictures; CJ E&M; Film Company RAM
- Distributed by: CJ Entertainment
- Release date: April 26, 2017 (South Korea)
- Running time: 114 minutes
- Country: South Korea
- Language: Korean
- Box office: US$11.5 million

The King's Case Note (Korean: 임금님의 사건수첩) is a 2017 South Korean comedy film directed by Moon Hyun-sung, starring Lee Sun-kyun and Ahn Jae-hong.

== Plot ==
A king and his archivist search for the truth behind a crime that threatens the stability of the kingdom.

== Cast ==
- Lee Sun-kyun as King Yejong
  - Kang Chan-hee as young King Yejong
- Ahn Jae-hong as Yoon Yi-seo
- Kim Hee-won as Nam Gun-hee
- Kyung Soo-jin as Sun-hwa
- Jung Hae-in as Heuk-woon
- Joo Jin-mo as Jik Je-hak
- Jang Young-nam as Soo-bin
- Park Hyung-soo as Officer
- Shim Wan-joon as Fisherman
- Kim Eung-soo as First vice-premier
- Park Jeong-min as Crown Prince Ui-kyung (special appearance)
