= Mask Girl =

2023 South Korean television series

- Promotional poster
- Hangul: 마스크걸
- RR: Maseukeugeol
- MR: Masŭk'ŭgŏl
- Genre: Black comedy; Crime; Thriller
- Based on: Mask Girl by Mae-mi and Hee-se
- Developed by: Song Sang-beom (planning)
- Written by: Kim Young-hoon
- Directed by: Kim Young-hoon
- Starring: Lee Han-byeol; Nana; Go Hyun-jung; Ahn Jae-hong; Yeom Hye-ran
- Music by: Jang Young-kyu
- Country of origin: South Korea
- Original language: Korean
- No. of episodes: 7

Production
- Producers: Son Sang-beom; Oh Kwang-hee; Moon Seok-hwan; Kim Yong-hoon
- Running time: 51–65 minutes
- Production companies: Bon Factory; House of Impressions

Original release
- Network: Netflix
- Release: August 18, 2023

Mask Girl (Korean: 마스크걸) is a 2023 South Korean black comedy crime thriller television series written and directed by Kim Yong-hoon, and starring Lee Han-byeol in her acting debut, Nana, Go Hyun-jung, Ahn Jae-hong, and Yeom Hye-ran. It is based on the Naver webtoon of the same name by Mae-mi and Hee-se, which was published between 2015 and 2018. It was released on Netflix on August 18, 2023.

== Synopsis ==
Kim Mo-mi, an office worker who is insecure about her looks, becomes a masked internet personality by night—until a chain of unexpected, ill-fated events begins to overtake her life.

== Cast ==
=== Main ===
- Lee Han-byeol as Kim Mo-mi/Mask Girl (in 2009, before surgery)
  - Nana as Kim Mo-mi/A-reum (after plastic surgery)
  - Go Hyun-jung as Kim Mo-mi/No. 1047 (in 2023)
- Ahn Jae-hong as Ju Oh-nam: an ordinary office worker who is Mo-mi's co-worker and Mask Girl's regular viewer whom he admires
- Yeom Hye-ran as Kim Kyung-ja: Oh-nam's overprotective mother who seeks revenge against Mo-mi

=== Supporting ===
- Park Jung-hwa as Lee A-reum: Mo-mi's colleague
- Choi Daniel as Park Gi-hoon: Mo-mi's boss
- Kim Min-seo as Kim Ye-chun: Mi-mo's best friend
- Moon Sook as Sim Young-hee: Mo-mi's mother
- Shin Ye-seo as Kim Mi-mo: Oh-nam and Mo-mi's daughter
- Han Jae-yi as Kim Chun-ae: Mo-mi's best friend
- Kim Ga-hee as Yoo Sang-soon: Mo-mi's colleague
- Lee Soo-mi as Ahn Eun-suk
- Jang Won-young as Manager Kim
- Lee Seon-hee as Chief Oh: a prison warden
- Lee Jun-young as Choi Bu-yong: Chun-ae's boyfriend in a special appearance

== Episodes ==
No.	Title	Directed by	Written by	Original release date
1	"Kim Mo-mi"	Kim Young-hoon	Kim Young-hoon	August 18, 2023
Kim Mo-mi grew up with dreams of becoming a pop star, but was thwarted by her plain looks. By day, she works in an office, and by night, she runs a popular livestream channel where she wears a mask and performs as "Mask Girl". Mo-mi is distraught when she discovers that Park Gi-hoon, her boss and the man whom she has feelings for, is cheating on his wife with Lee A-reum, one of her co-workers. Mo-mi's popularity plummets after she loses her livestream and confesses her woes to a regular Mask Girl viewer, unaware he is her co-worker, Ju Oh-nam.
2	"Ju Oh-nam"	Kim Young-hoon	Kim Young-hoon	August 18, 2023
Ju Oh-nam is a socially inept loner and a regular viewer of Mask Girl's channel, recognizing her to be Kim Mo-mi based on the distinct moles on both of her hands. Oh-nam falls in love with Mo-mi, but is unable to express his feelings. Mo-mi meets up with a wealthy Mask Girl fan who tries to rape her, but he is knocked out in a scuffle. Oh-nam, stalking Mo-mi, rushes to her aid; he kills the man himself while disposing of the body for her. Traumatized by her experiences, Mo-mi abruptly quits her job and undergoes plastic surgery. Oh-nam tracks down her address and rapes Mo-mi, who stabs him to death in retaliation.
3	"Kim Kyung-Ja"	Kim Young-hoon	Kim Young-hoon	August 18, 2023
Kim Kyung-ja is Oh-nam's overbearing mother, who struggled to raise him as a single parent. When Oh-nam becomes uncontactable, Kyung-ja has the police break into his apartment, where they find the remains of Oh-nam's victim. Later, the police also find Oh-nam's remains in a suitcase. Kyung-ja believes that Mo-mi, who has been revealed to the public to be Mask Girl, is Oh-nam's murderer, and vows revenge. Kyung-ja's investigation leads her to a woman named Kim Chun-ae, whom she kidnaps and threatens at gunpoint. Chun-ae insists that she is not Mo-mi, but claims to know her.
4	"Kim Chun-ae"	Kim Young-hoon	Kim Young-hoon	August 18, 2023
Kim Chun-ae tells Kyung-ja that Mo-mi is her rival at the club where they work, and offers to help Kyung-ja get her revenge. However, this is all a lie; Chun-ae and Mo-mi are actually close friends as they grew up similarly ostracized and had extensive plastic surgery in order to start new lives. Mo-mi helps Chun-ae kill her abusive live-in partner, and the pair make their escape. Mo-mi reveals to Chun-ae that she is pregnant with Oh-nam's child. They are confronted by Kyung-ja, and in the melee, Kyung-ja shoots Chun-ae, who bludgeons Kyung-ja in the head before dying from her wound. Mo-mi dumps both of their bodies in a lake. Sometime later, she is arrested.
5	"Kim Mi-mo"	Kim Young-hoon	Kim Young-hoon	August 18, 2023
Kim Mi-mo is Mo-mi and Oh-nam's biological daughter. As a baby, Mi-mo was given to her grandmother shortly before Mo-mi surrendered to police and was sent to prison. Growing up, Mi-mo is bullied for being Mask Girl's daughter and becomes a loner who frequently lashes out. At a new school, Mi-mo befriends Ye-chun, a compulsive liar who is also a loner. The pair grows extremely close – with Ye-chun implied to secretly have feelings for Mi-mo – and plan to run away together. One day, Mi-mo overhears that the other students have learned that she is the daughter of Mask Girl; Mi-mo beats up Ye-chun, assuming that she told everyone. However, the info was spread by Kyung-ja, who is still alive, working at a food truck parked outside the school.
6	"Kim Mo-mi"	Kim Young-hoon	Kim Young-hoon	August 18, 2023
In prison, Mo-mi initially antagonizes An Eun-suk, a prisoner with powerful connections. Years later, an older Mo-mi receives an anonymous letter from Kyung-ja that contains a news article about Mi-mo's troubled life; Mo-mi attempts to escape but fails. After over a month in solitary confinement, Mo-mi seemingly turns over a new leaf and offers to donate her kidney to Eun-suk's daughter, who needs it. Kyung-ja, who has had slight plastic surgery to avoid police, meets Mo-mi and tells her about how she befriended Mi-mo, repeatedly sabotaged her life, and intends for Mo-mi to feel the same pain of the loss of a child.
7	"Mi-mo and Mo-mi"	Kim Young-hoon	Kim Young-hoon	August 18, 2023
Mi-mo runs away to live with Kyung-ja, who is surprised when Mi-mo treats her lovingly. Despite having second thoughts, Kyung-ja attempts to strangle Mi-mo to death in front of a camera. Mo-mi is taken to the hospital for a kidney transplant and escapes. Mo-mi, Ye-chun, and Mi-mo's grandmother individually race to Kyung-ja's house. The trio arrives in time to save Mi-mo, but not before Kyung-ja stabs Mi-mo's grandmother to death. After the police arrive, Kyung-ja attempts to shoot Mi-mo, but Mo-mi sacrifices herself to protect her daughter and dies in Mi-mo's arms while Kyung-ja is shot by police. Afterward, Kyung-ja's crimes are exposed while Mi-mo is taken by Ye-chun's parents as a foster family. In order to cope with her trauma due to her mother's death, Mi-mo watches a childhood video of Mo-mi, who dances at a talent show, thanking her late mother for making her dream to be "loved by everyone".

== Reception ==
=== Critical response ===
On the review aggregator website Rotten Tomatoes, 100% of 9 critics' reviews are positive, with an average rating of 7.5/10.

=== Awards and nominations ===
Name of the award ceremony, year presented, category, nominee of the award, and the result of the nomination
Award ceremony	Year	Category	Nominee / Work	Result	Ref.
Asia Contents Awards & Global OTT Awards	2024	Best Supporting Actor	Ahn Jae-hong	Won	
Asia Contents Awards & Global OTT Awards	2024	Best Supporting Actress	Yeom Hye-ran	Won	
Baeksang Arts Awards	2024	Best Supporting Actor	Ahn Jae-hong	Won	
Baeksang Arts Awards	2024	Best Supporting Actress	Yeom Hye-ran	Won	
Baeksang Arts Awards	2024	Best New Actress	Lee Han-byeol	Nominated	
Blue Dragon Series Awards	2024	Best Drama	Mask Girl	Nominated	
Blue Dragon Series Awards	2024	Best Supporting Actor	Ahn Jae-hong	Won	
Blue Dragon Series Awards	2024	Best Supporting Actress	Yeom Hye-ran	Nominated	
Critics' Choice Awards	2024	Best Foreign Language Series	Mask Girl	Nominated	
Director's Cut Awards	2024	Best New Actor in a Series	Lee Jun-young	Nominated	
Seoul International Drama Awards	2024	Best Actress	Yeom Hye-ran	Won	
Seoul International Drama Awards	2024	Best Actor	Ahn Jae-hong	Won	
