= 2nd Wildflower Film Awards =

2015 edition of award ceremony

- Date: April 9, 2015
- Site: Literature House, Seoul

The 2nd Wildflower Film Awards (Korean: 들꽃영화상) is an awards ceremony recognizing the achievements of Korean independent and low-budget films. It was held at the Literature House in Seoul on April 9, 2015. The selection committee was composed of 25 film professionals and regular audience members who met often to view and discuss new releases; their nomination list was further narrowed in the final voting stage by invited critics and programmers. 21 films were nominated across 10 categories from a pool of 60 narrative films and 30 documentaries, each with a budget under ₩1 billion (US$900,000) and released theatrically between January 1 and December 31, 2014.

The nine categories from the inaugural ceremony were expanded to ten this year. An overall Grand Prize (Daesang) and Best Screenplay were added, Best Director was divided into narrative films and documentaries, and Best New Actor or Actress was divided into two according to gender. Founder and event director Darcy Paquet said, "Starting from the 2nd award ceremony onwards, we plan to keep this format."

There were ten awards in total: the Grand Prize, Best Director - Narrative Films, Best Director - Documentaries, Best Actor, Best Actress, Best New Director, Best New Actor, Best New Actress, Best Screenplay, and Best Cinematography. The Grand Prize was chosen among the 14 nominees for Best Director - Narrative Films and Best Director - Documentaries. Prizewinners each received a specially designed ceramic trophy from Konkuk University professor Harin Lee, a well-known figure in Korea's ceramic arts community.

In addition to the ceremony, six of the nominated films were screened in the three days leading up to the awards (April 6–8) at the Seoul Theater, along with Q&A sessions with the nominated directors and actors. The first volume of bilingual book Wildflower Film Awards Annual was also published, featuring essays and interviews on 11 independent Korean films, each accompanied by specially commissioned illustrations by local artists.

== Nominations and winners ==
(Winners denoted in bold)

Grand Prize
**Han Gong-ju**
Best Director (Narrative Films)	Best Director (Documentaries)
**Hong Sang-soo** - **Hill of Freedom**; July Jung - A Girl at My Door; Lee Su-jin - Han Gong-ju; Lee Yong-seung - 10 Minutes; Leesong Hee-il - Night Flight; Woo Moon-gi - The King of Jokgu; Zhang Lu - Gyeongju	**Park Chan-kyong** - **Manshin: Ten Thousand Spirits**; Hong Jae-hui - My Father's Emails; Jung Yoon-suk - Non-fiction Diary; Kelvin Kyung Kun Park - A Dream of Iron; Lee Chang-jae - The Hospice; Lee Sang-ho, Ahn Hae-ryong - The Truth Shall Not Sink with Sewol; Park Moon-chil - My Place
Best Actor	Best Actress
**Ahn Jae-hong** - **The King of Jokgu**; Jung Eui-gap - The Dinner; Park Hae-il - Gyeongju; Ryo Kase - Hill of Freedom; Song Sae-byeok - A Girl at My Door	**Chun Woo-hee** - **Han Gong-ju**; Bae Doona - A Girl at My Door; Kim Sae-ron - A Girl at My Door; Moon So-ri - Hill of Freedom; Shin Min-a - Gyeongju
Best Screenplay	Best Cinematography
**July Jung** - **A Girl at My Door**; Hong Sang-soo - Hill of Freedom; Kim Da-hyun - 10 Minutes; Kim Tae-gon - The King of Jokgu; Lee Su-jin - Han Gong-ju	**Kelvin Kyung Kun Park, Stone Kim** - **A Dream of Iron**; Cho Young-jik - Gyeongju; Hong Jae-sik - Han Gong-ju; Jee Yune-jeong, Lee Sun-young, Yoo Ji-sun - Manshin: Ten Thousand Spirits; Kim Hyun-seok - A Girl at My Door
Best New Director	
**Lee Yong-seung** - **10 Minutes**; July Jung - A Girl at My Door; Lee Su-jin - Han Gong-ju; Park Chan-kyong - Manshin: Ten Thousand Spirits; Woo Moon-gi - The King of Jokgu	
Best New Actor	Best New Actress
**Choi Woo-shik** - **Set Me Free**; Baek Jong-hwan - 10 Minutes; Byun Yo-han - Tinker Ticker; Kwak Si-yang - Night Flight; Lee Jae-joon - Night Flight	**Kim Su-an** - **Mad Sad Bad (Picnic)**; Hwang Seung-eon - The King of Jokgu; Kong Ye-ji - Shuttlecock; Lee Yoo-young - Late Spring; Park Joo-hee - The Wicked
Achievement Award	Special Jury Prize
**Jung Sang-jin, CEO of Atninefilm**	**Shin Min-a** - **Gyeongju**
