= Han Gong-ju =

- Hangul: 한공주
- RR: Han Gongju
- MR: Han Kongju
- Directed by: Lee Su-jin
- Written by: Lee Su-jin
- Produced by: Lee Su-jin
- Starring: Chun Woo-hee
- Cinematography: Hong Jae-sik
- Edited by: Choi Hyun-sook
- Music by: Kim Tae-seong
- Distributed by: CGV Movie Collage
- Release dates: October 4, 2013 (Busan International Film Festival); April 17, 2014 (South Korea)
- Running time: 112 minutes
- Country: South Korea
- Language: Korean

Han Gong-ju (Korean: 한공주) is a 2013 South Korean crime drama film written and directed by Lee Su-jin, starring Chun Woo-hee in the title role. It was inspired by the infamous Miryang gang rape case of 2004. The film premiered at the 2013 Busan International Film Festival where it won the CGV Movie Collage Award and the Citizen Reviewers' Award. It was released in theaters on April 17, 2014.

== Plot ==
The movie starts with Gong Ju (Chun Woo hee) facing a crowd of disparaging adults as she tells them she did nothing wrong. The scene shifts to her teacher from her current school, Lee Nan do (Jo Dae Hee), helping her pack her luggage as she is about to be transferred to another school in a different town. As they eat lunch, he tells her that it was not her fault but to wait for the results of the trial before deciding what to do next and meanwhile not to answer any phone calls. Lee manages to make her school transition as smooth as possible despite it being mid semester. He then brings Gong Ju to the convenience store owned by his mother, Mrs. Cho, for possible boarding in her house. Initially the mother refuses but eventually allows her to stay.

In a flashback to the past, Gong Ju is working as a cashier at a convenience store when a friend/classmate and son of the store owner, Dong Yoon (Choi Yong Jun), walks in visibly beaten as he grabs some food and heads back out to see his friends. The next day at school, she meets her friend Hwa Ok (Kim So Young) and they talk about the incident.

One day at school in the present, Gong Ju is walking down the hall and peers through a classroom window where a small group of girls are rehearsing an a cappella song. When the leader of the group, Eun Hee (Jung In Sung), sees her, she quickly walks away. Gong Ju attends swimming lessons and meets Eun Hee who tries to befriend her after hearing her sing in the changing room. Eun Hee asks Gong Ju to join the a cappella group. Although Gong Ju is not interested, she asks Eun Hee for the loan of her phone to help with directions so she can find her mother. They take a bus and Gong Ju goes to her mother's work but ultimately, she is rejected and dismissed. Eun Hee overhears the conversation. Gong Ju confronts her and recalls her friend Hwa Ok. Afterwards, she angrily visits her mother's boyfriend's shop and forcefully kisses and bites him before running away.

Gong Ju stops by the empty music room at school and starts to sing where she is heard by Eun Hee and her friends. Slowly, she begins to open up to the girls and shares with them that her goal is to learn to swim at least 25 metres. Gong Ju's friends decide to post a video of her singing and details about her on the Internet so she can start a fan club, but upon hearing this Gong Ju becomes angry and demands that they remove the video immediately. Her friends are puzzled by her reaction and an argument ensues. Shortly afterwards, a cluster of angry parents barge in and interrupt the class to harass Gong Ju for having put their sons in jail. Gong Ju runs away and hides in an empty room.

Another flashback is shown where Hwa Ok is being gang raped in Gong-Ju's house. Before that, Gong Ju arrives at her house where Dong Yoon, Hwa Ok and at least 15 guys are hanging out and drinking. Dong Yoon is shown being bullied by his friends, with one of them implying he also rapes Dong Yoon. Although Gong Ju does not drink, Dong Yoon insists she drink a beer that, unbeknownst to her, has been drugged. Gong Ju takes the drink as Dong Yoon reassures her that the guys will leave if she does so. Under the influence of the drug, she is gang raped as well. The "party" ends when Dong Yoon's father arrives and takes Dong Yoon, who was just in the midst of his turn of raping one of the girls, home; his father notices but ignores that the other girls is currently raped too.

Soon afterwards, Hwa Ok commits suicide by jumping off a bridge. The scene returns to the present where Gong Ju is sitting with the principal as he advises her he will discuss the situation with the board, not having known about her past. Mrs. Cho's boyfriend doubts her innocence and urges her to kick Gong Ju out of the house but Gong Ju leaves willingly, after telling them Hwa Ok was pregnant but she did not do anything to help her.

Gong Ju's friends at school find out about the rape, they text her to ask where she is and to say that it is not her fault. Eun Hee and her friends are horrified after seeing the video of Hwa Ok being raped, but she does not immediately answer a call from Gong Ju. Meanwhile, Gong Ju is seen walking towards a bridge where she jumps into the water; an underwater shadow is then shown swimming away, swimming much more adroitly than she ever managed. A background voice is heard asking Gong Ju why she wants to swim so badly. Gong Ju's response is "In case I want to start over because my mind could change." Her friends are heard chanting and cheering her name as she drowns.

== Cast ==
- Chun Woo-hee as Han Gong-ju
- Jung In-sun as Eun-hee
- Kim So-young as Hwa-ok
- Lee Young-lan as Ms. Cho
- Kwon Beom-taek as Police substation chief
- Jo Dae-hee as Lee Nan-do
- Choi Yong-joon as Dong-yoon
- Kim Hyun-joon as Min-ho
- Yoo Seung-mok as Gong-ju's father
- Sung Yeo-jin as Gong-ju's mother
- Kim Jung-suk as New husband of Gong-ju's mother
- Son Seul-gi as Min-suh
- Lee Chung-hee as Chung-hee
- Kim Ye-won as Ye-won
- Lee Ja-yeon as Ja-yeon
- Oh Hee-joon as Min-ho's gang
- Ha Jeong-hee as Homeroom teacher
- Im Dong-seok as Dong-yoon's father
- Min Kyung-jin as Principal

== Reception ==
=== Box office ===
Han Gong-ju was released on just over 200 screens (a sizeable exposure for a Korean independent film), and through strong word of mouth, it was a hit with critics and audiences. On its opening day on April 17, 2014, approximately 10,000 people watched the film, but this increased at an unprecedented pace, crossing the 100,000 admissions mark (an enormous benchmark for a Korean independent production) in just nine days, which was quicker than the pace of recent indie favorites, such as Breathless (2009) in 19 days and Bedevilled (2010) in ten. As of April 29, it reached the 150,000 audience mark, breaking the record of Jiseul (2013), which sold 140,490 tickets in 12 days.

By May 9, Han Gong-ju exceeded 200,000 viewers, making it one of the most successful Korean independent films of all time. Amid the opening of such large scale commercial films as The Fatal Encounter, The Target and The Amazing Spider-Man 2, it continued to attract average audiences of 2,000 a day. At the end of its run, the film had a total of 223,297 admissions.

=== Critical response ===
As it traveled the international film festival circuit, Han Gong-ju won several top prizes, including the Golden Star at the 2013 Marrakech International Film Festival, the Tiger Award (given to films that "give young filmmakers a voice" and "push boundaries") at the 2014 International Film Festival Rotterdam, and the Jury Prize, the Critics' Prize, and the Audience Award at the 2014 Deauville Asian Film Festival.

The Rotterdam jury praised it as "a skillfully crafted and highly accomplished debut. Deviating from a typical chronological narrative structure, the film lures the spectator to participate in the pleasures of storytelling through an extraordinary and intricate narrative puzzle."

== Awards and nominations ==
Year	Award	Category	Recipient	Result
2013	18th Busan International Film Festival	CGV Movie Collage Award	Han Gong-ju	Won
2013	18th Busan International Film Festival	Citizen Reviewers' Award	Han Gong-ju	Won
2013	13th Marrakech International Film Festival	Golden Star	Han Gong-ju	Won
2014	43rd International Film Festival Rotterdam	Tiger Award	Han Gong-ju	Won
2014	16th Deauville Asian Film Festival	Jury Prize	Han Gong-ju	Won
2014	16th Deauville Asian Film Festival	Critics' Prize	Han Gong-ju	Won
2014	16th Deauville Asian Film Festival	Audience Award	Han Gong-ju	Won
2014	18th Fantasia International Film Festival	Audience Award, Best Asian Film - Silver	Han Gong-ju	Won
2014	14th Director's Cut Awards	Best New Actress	Chun Woo-hee	Won
2014	14th Director's Cut Awards	Best Independent Film Director	Lee Su-jin	Won
2014	23rd Buil Film Awards	Best Film	Han Gong-ju	Nominated
2014	23rd Buil Film Awards	Best Actress	Chun Woo-hee	Nominated
2014	23rd Buil Film Awards	Best New Director	Lee Su-jin	Nominated
2014	23rd Buil Film Awards	Best New Actress	Chun Woo-hee	Nominated
2014	23rd Buil Film Awards	Best Screenplay	Lee Su-jin	Nominated
2014	34th Korean Association of Film Critics Awards	Best Actress	Chun Woo-hee	Won
2014	34th Korean Association of Film Critics Awards	Best Screenplay	Lee Su-jin	Won
2014	34th Korean Association of Film Critics Awards	Critics' Top 10	Han Gong-ju	Won
2014	51st Grand Bell Awards	Best Actress	Chun Woo-hee	Nominated
2014	51st Grand Bell Awards	Best New Director	Lee Su-jin	Nominated
2014	51st Grand Bell Awards	Best Screenplay	Lee Su-jin	Nominated
2014	15th Women in Film Korea Awards	Best Actress	Chun Woo-hee	Won
2014	35th Blue Dragon Film Awards	Best Actress	Chun Woo-hee	Won
2014	35th Blue Dragon Film Awards	Best New Director	Lee Su-jin	Won
2014	35th Blue Dragon Film Awards	Best Screenplay	Lee Su-jin	Nominated
2014	35th Blue Dragon Film Awards	Best Editing	Choi Hyun-sook	Nominated
2015	6th KOFRA Film Awards	Best Film	Han Gong-ju	Won
2015	6th KOFRA Film Awards	Best Actress	Chun Woo-hee	Won
2015	6th KOFRA Film Awards	Discovery Award	Chun Woo-hee	Won
2015	10th Max Movie Awards	Best Actress	Chun Woo-hee	Won
2015	10th Max Movie Awards	Best Independent Film	Han Gong-ju	Won
2015	20th Chunsa Film Art Awards	Best Actress	Chun Woo-hee	Nominated
2015	20th Chunsa Film Art Awards	Best New Director	Lee Su-jin	Nominated
2015	2nd Wildflower Film Awards	Grand Prize	Han Gong-ju	Won
2015	2nd Wildflower Film Awards	Best Director (Narrative Film)	Lee Su-jin	Nominated
2015	2nd Wildflower Film Awards	Best Actress	Chun Woo-hee	Won
2015	2nd Wildflower Film Awards	Best Screenplay	Lee Su-jin	Nominated
2015	2nd Wildflower Film Awards	Best Cinematography	Hong Jae-sik	Nominated
2015	2nd Wildflower Film Awards	Best New Director	Lee Su-jin	Nominated
2015	51st Baeksang Arts Awards	Best Film	Han Gong-ju	Nominated
2015	51st Baeksang Arts Awards	Best New Director	Lee Su-jin	Nominated
2015	51st Baeksang Arts Awards	Best New Actress	Chun Woo-hee	Won
2015	51st Baeksang Arts Awards	Best Screenplay	Lee Su-jin	Nominated
