= Idol (film) =

2019 film directed by Lee Su-jin

- Theatrical release poster
- Hangul: 우상
- RR: Usang
- MR: Usang
- Directed by: Lee Su-jin
- Written by: Lee Su-jin
- Produced by: An Eun-mi; Han Sang-hyun
- Starring: Han Suk-kyu; Sul Kyung-gu; Chun Woo-hee
- Cinematography: Son Won-ho
- Edited by: Choi Hyun-sook
- Music by: Kim Tae-seong
- Production companies: Pollux Barunson Production; Vill Lee Film
- Distributed by: CGV Arthouse
- Release date: March 20, 2019
- Running time: 143 minutes
- Country: South Korea
- Language: Korean
- Box office: US$1.4 million

Idol (Korean: 우상) is a 2019 South Korean thriller film written and directed by Lee Su-jin, starring Han Suk-kyu, Sul Kyung-gu and Chun Woo-hee. It was theatrically released on March 20, 2019.

== Plot ==
Goo Myung-hui, a provincial council member renowned for his integrity and strong moral principles, is receiving overwhelming public support and is considered a frontrunner for the next governor. One day, he learns that his son was involved in a car accident and attempted to cover it up. Determined to protect his political career above all else, he makes the difficult decision to turn his son in.

Meanwhile, Yoo Joong-sik, whose entire world revolves around his son, Boo-nam, would do anything for him. When his son, who has a physical disability, suddenly dies in a car accident and returns as a cold corpse, Joong-sik falls into despair. Unable to understand his son's actions on the day of the accident and desperate to find his missing daughter-in-law, Choi Ryeon-hwa, who vanished without a trace that night, he seeks help from the police. However, no one listens to him.

Determined to uncover the hidden truth behind his son's death, Joong-sik embarks on his own investigation. Meanwhile, Ryeon-hwa, the only person who knows what truly happened that night, harbors a secret that no one else knows and that no one should ever find out.

== Cast ==
- Han Suk-kyu as Goo Myung-hui
- Sul Kyung-gu as Yoo Joong-sik
- Chun Woo-hee as Choi Ryeon-hwa
- Yoo Seung-mok as Hwang-byun
- Hyun Bong-sik as Detective Kim
- Kang Mal-geum as Myung-hui's wife
- Kim Seong-nyeo as Myung-hui's mother
- Seo Joo-hee as Dong-sook
- Kim Myung-gon as Member of national assembly Choi
- Jo Byung-gyu as Yo-han
- Lee Woo-hyun as Boo-nam
- Kim Seo-won as Assistant Kim
- Kim Jong-man as Kim Yong-goo
- Kim Hee-jung as Red-light district female boss
- Kim Jae-hwa as Soo-ryeon
- Lee Yeong-seok as Stepfather
- Seung Ooi-yeol as Kim Byun
- Jeon Jin-ki as Member of national assembly Kim

== Production ==
Principal photography began on October 24, 2017, and wrapped on April 9, 2018.
