= Vara: A Blessing =

- Directed by: Khyentse Norbu
- Screenplay by: Khyentse Norbu
- Based on: Rakta Aar Kanna (Blood and Tears) by Sunil Gangopadhyay
- Produced by: Nanette Nelms
- Starring: Shahana Goswami; Devesh Ranjan; Mohamed Adamaly; Rohit Raj
- Cinematography: Bradford Young
- Edited by: William Chang
- Music by: Nitin Sawhney
- Release dates: October 3, 2013 (Busan International Film Festival); 2013 (US)
- Running time: 96 min.
- Country: United States
- Language: English

Vara: A Blessing is a 2013 English drama film directed by Khyentse Norbu and starring Shahana Goswami, Devesh Ranjan, Mohamed Adamaly and Rohit Raj. It is the first English-language feature film by the Bhutanese film director, after The Cup (1999) and Travellers and Magicians (2003). Based on a Bengali short story Rakta Aar Kanna (Blood and Tears) by Sunil Gangopadhyay, about the daughter of a devadasi, who falls in love with a Muslim sculptor. It was the opening film of 2013 18th Busan International Film Festival, where it received good reviews.

== Cast ==
- Shahana Goswami as Lila
- Devesh Ranjan as Shyam
- Mohamed Adamaly as Ali
- Rohit Raj as Subha
- Ruvin De Silva as Raju
- Yashodha Suriyapperuma as Basu
- Swaroopa Ghosh as Jyoti
- Geeta Chandran as Vinata
- Kushan Weerasuriya as Vikram
- Dhanushka Nilaweera as Rajindar
- Pankaj Pawan as Prakash
