= Edgar Pêra =

Portuguese filmmaker (born 1960)

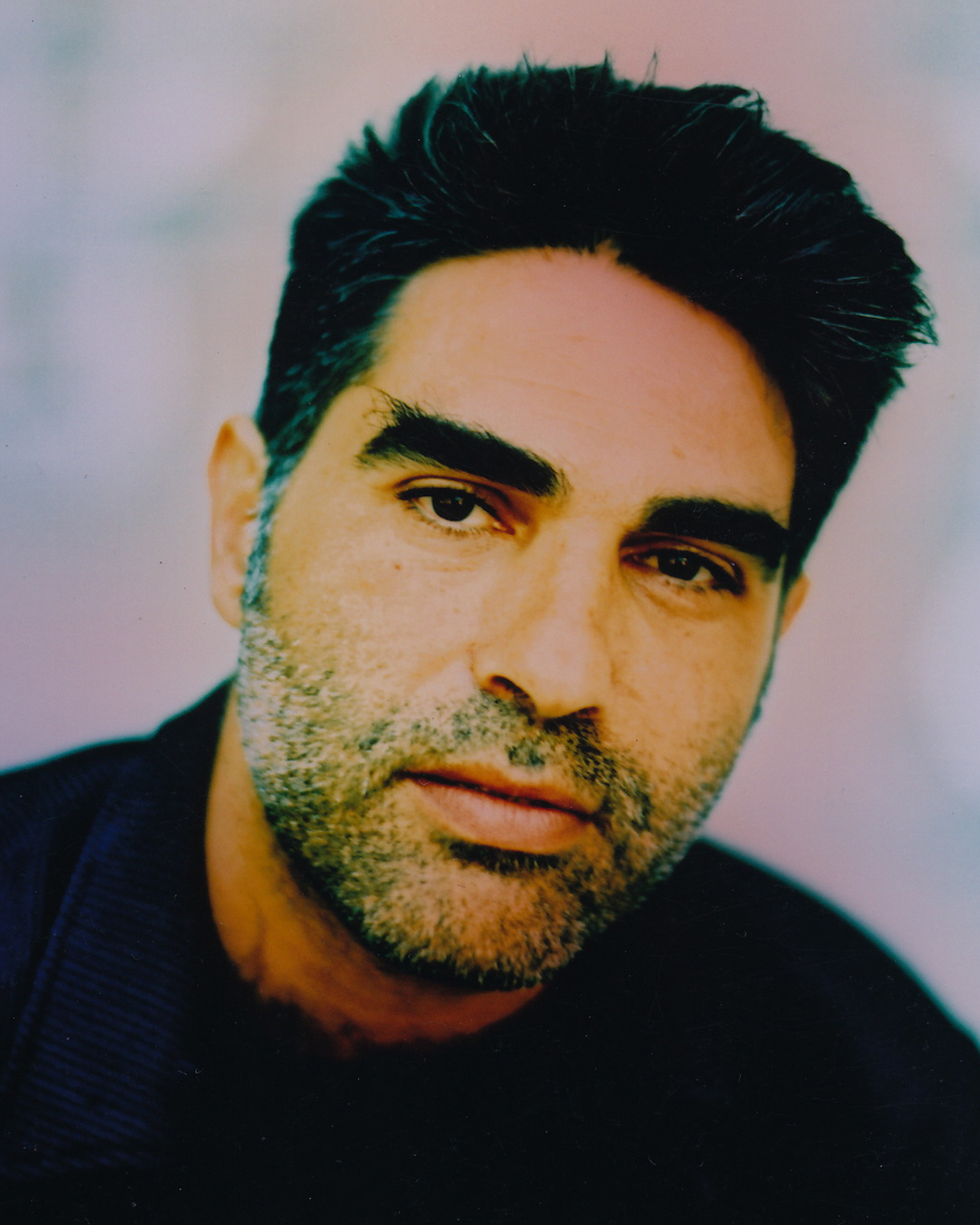
- Pêra in Lisbon
- Born: 19 November 1960 (age 66); Lisbon, Portugal
- Occupation: Film director
- Edgar Pêra's voice Recorded on 23 October 2023

Edgar Henrique Clemente Pêra (born 19 November 1960) is a Portuguese filmmaker. Pêra is also a fine artist and a graphic comics artist. and writes fiction and cinema essays (PhD). Edgar Pêra studied psychology, but switched to Film at the Portuguese National Conservatory, presently Lisbon Theatre and Film School (Escola Superior de Teatro e Cinema). Aka Mr. Ego (scripts), Man-Kamera (image), Artur Cyanetto (sound). Edgar Pêra has auto-financed and produced many his own movies, or directed "auteur films" for cultural institutions.

== Filmography ==
=== Features ===
- Vida e Obra de Cassiano Branco/Life & Work of Cassiano Branco (documentary) (1991)
- Manual de Evasão LX94/Manual Of Evasion LX94 (1994)
- A Janela (Maryalva Mix)/The Window (Maryalva Mix) (2001)
- Oito, oito/Eight Eight (originally for TV feature) (2001)
- O Homem-Teatro/The Man-Theatre (2001)
- Movimentos Perpétuos: Cine-Tributo a Carlos Paredes/Perpetual Movements:Cine-Tribute to Carlos Paredes (2006)
- Rio Turvo/Muddy River (2007)
- Punk Is Not Daddy (documentary) (2012)
- O Barão/The Baron (2011)
- Visões de Madredeus/Vision of Madredeus(documentary) (2012)
- Cinesapiens segment from 3X3D (together with Jean-Luc Godard and Peter Greenaway) (2013)
- Lisbon Revisited (2014)
- O Espectador Espantado/The Amazed Spectator (2016)
- Adeus Carne/Goodbye Flesh(2017)
- o Homem-Pykante Diálogos Kom Pimenta/Spicy-Man (2018)
- Caminhos Magnétykos/Magnetick Pathways (2018)
- KINORAMA - BEYOND THE WALLS OF CINEMA (2019)

=== Short films ===
- Reproduta Interdita (1990)
- A Cidade de Cassiano/The City of Cassiano (1991)
- Matadouro/Slaughterhouse (1991)
- Guerra ou Paz?/War or Peace? (1992)
- Achbeit Macht Frei?/O Trabalho Liberta?/Work Liberates? (documentary) (1993)
- SWK4 (1993)
- O Mundo Desbotado/Fading World (1995)
- Túneis de Realidade (Who Is The Master Who Makes The Grass Green?) (1996)
- 25 de Abril: uma Aventura para a Democracia (documentary) (2000)
- Guitarra (com gente lá dentro)/Guitar (With People Inside) (2003)
- És a Nossa Fé/Our Faith (documentary) (2004)
- Stadium (Phantas-Mix) (2005)
- Impending Doom (2006)
- Arquitectura de Peso/Heavy Architecture (2007)
- Crime Azul/Bleu Krime (2009)
- Avant La Corrida (2009)
- One Way Or another (Reflections of a Psycho-Killer) (2012)
- Stillness (2014)
- The Cavern (2015–16)
- Goodbye Flesh (2017)
- KINO-POP ARCHIVES (13 short films for tv) (2018)

=== Proto-Films ===
- A Konspyração dos 1000 Tympanus/The 1000 Eardrums Konspiracy (1996)
- Champô Chaimite (2002)
- Os Homens-Toupeira/The Mole-man Saga (feature, 2003)
- Horror no Bairro Vermelho (Prólogo Documental)/Horror in the Red District (Documentary Prologue) (2011)

=== Films with students ===
- The Day of The Musician by Eric Satie (1996)
- The Misadventures of Man-Kamera Episodes 113 & 115 (1998)

=== Kino-Diaries(selection) ===
- Rua Anchieta (2016)
- Busan 3D Kino-Diary (2013)
- My Father's Hometown/Viagem com o meu pai a Coimbra (2011)
- Planeland 4 (2004)
- Keep Moooving 1 (2004)
- Krashlanding in Lisbon-98 (Also it's about time) (1998)
- Cacilhas-Cascais (Hip Hop Agit-Train) (1996)
- At Cabo Espichel with my Parents (1986)

=== Video Installations ===
- Trans-LX (1990)
- O Movimento da Pedra (1990)
- Videokorporis (1992)
- Não Há Flores! (1992)
- 666-O Triunfo do Azeite (video-performance) (1994)
- Incêndio no Museu Kabazov (1995)
- Satie live-mix (cine-performance) (1996)
- FashionViktimz (1996)
- Bica Amor & Fakadas (video and super 8 installation) (1997)
- Konsciêncya (1998)
- Kantos Enokyanus (1998)
- Cinekomix Marvels (1999)
- Eskynas Agudas (1999)
- A Porta (2000)
- The Master Person Tapes/Os Filmes do Desassossego de Mestre Pessoa (2002)
- Fiquem Qom a Qultura, eu fiko kom o Brazzil (2002)
- Keep Mooving 2 (2005)
- Sub-Mundo (2015)
- Lisboa Revisitada (3D photography and 3D video exhibition) (2016)

=== Cine-Concerts (original films mixed with live-shooting by Pêra) ===
- LOVECRAFTLAND Live Music by Randolph Carter (Paulo Furtado aka The Legendary Tigerman) (2018)
- FONTAÍNHAS Live Music by Rui Lima and Sérgio Martins (Porto, 2017)
- VADE RETRO Live Music by Tó Trips and João Doce (Serralves, Porto, 2016)
- Kino-Ping-Pong Live Music by António Vitorino de Almeida (Lisboa, 2014)
- Lima & Louro – Filmes de Lisboa Live Music by André Louro and João Lima (São Jorge, Lisboa, 2010)
- Kino-Diaries live music by Micro Audiowaves and LIP (Serralves, Porto 2006)
- Koktail Filmzz live music by João Lima (ZDB, Lisboa 2005)
- Kino-Diaries live music by Novolari (ZDB, Lisboa, 2005)
- Granular Improvising with Microaudiowaves and LIP (Lisboa, 2005)
- ABRIL-BRAZZIL live music by João Madeira (Lisboa, 2005)
- SUDWESTERN music Dead Combo with performances by actors-singers (Lisboa, Guarda, Amsterdam, 2004)
- NAKED MIND PROJEKT Live music by Vítor Rua (2002–2004)
- Straxt! films for the concert of Lydia Lunch (2004)
- Kino-Super8 live music by Francisco Rebelo (ZDB, Lisboa, 2000)
- As Alucinações Estão Aí! Live music by Nuno Rebelo and Jean-Marc Mantera (Lisboa, Porto 1995)
- Eles Sempre Aí Estiveram (1995)
- Vizões Equações Radiações! live Music by Nuno Rebelo and Marco Franco (1995)
- Cine-Fado live music by Manuel João Vieira (1993)
- Ultimatum Futurista live music by Nuno Rebelo (1993)
- Cinerock live music by Tiago Lopes (1990)

=== Music vídeos ===
- Madredeus at IFP (1989)
- Korações de Atum Mini musical movie Lello Minsk and Shegundo Galarza (2000)
- U ke Faz Falta? film commemorating the 25 of April revolution music selected by Miguel esteves Cardoso (1995)
- Zombietown23 Texts of Terence Mckenna Aleister Crowley and Fernando Pessoa. Commissioned by Expo 98 (1998)
- “You” by DJ Vibe & Ithaka (Ithaka Darin Pappas) location: Tokyo
- videoclips for GNR, Rádio Macau, Madredeus, Resistência, Capitão Fantasma, LX90, Rão Kiao, Black Company, Djamal, Terrakota, The Legendary Tigerman, Bullet, No Data, Orlando Cohen, Remexido.

== Criticism and Praise ==
- "The montage is as relentless as the guitarist's finger-work, the footage as compelling as the music is poignant.", The Barbican (a multi-art organization) on Perpetual Movements
- "Cartoonishly weird comedy", The Worldwide Celluloid Massacre on The Window (Don Juan Mix)

"the find here is lesser known Portuguese director Pêra's weird and wacky whirlwind of a film; a sharply astute indictment of mainstream cinema and culture." (Arun Sharma about Cinesapiens and 3X3D)

"Cinesapiens, keeps audiences guessing right to the final frame, ending with a surreal and haunting scene experience." Cinesapiens: "pure visual chaos"

== See also ==
- Cinema of Portugal
