= Jalanan =

- Directed by: Daniel Ziv
- Produced by: Daniel Ziv
- Starring: Bambang "Ho" Mulyono, Titi Juwariyah, Boni Putera
- Cinematography: Daniel Ziv
- Edited by: Ernest Hariyanto
- Music by: Dadang Pranoto, Ernest Hariyanto
- Production company: DesaKota Productions
- Distributed by: pending
- Release date: October 5, 2013 (limited)
- Running time: 107 minutes
- Country: Indonesia
- Language: Bahasa Indonesia

Jalanan (“Streetside” in Bahasa Indonesia) is a 2013 feature-length Indonesian documentary film directed and produced by Daniel Ziv and featuring Jakarta street musicians Bambang "Ho" Mulyono, Titi Juwariyah and Boni Putera. The movie follows the three musicians as they perform songs on Jakarta's commuter buses, clash with the law and confront the tumultuous politics of modern-day Indonesia. It follows them back to their home villages in East Java and traces their quest for legitimacy, identity and love in their adopted city of Jakarta. Jalanan won the Best Documentary prize at the prestigious Busan International Film Festival in October, 2013.

== Synopsis ==
The film follows the three musicians over five years as they struggle to earn a living busking on Jakarta's crowded city buses.

== Synopsis ==
JALANAN ('Streetside') tells the captivating story of Boni, Ho & Titi, three gifted, charismatic street musicians in Jakarta over a tumultuous 5-year period in their own lives and that of Indonesia. The film follows the young marginalized musicians and their never before seen sub-culture, while also painting a striking, moody and intimate portrait of Indonesia's frenzied capital city. Using the powerful soundtrack of the musicians' original compositions to drive the film, it traces their elusive quest for identity and love in the day-to-day of a city overrun by the effects of globalization and corruption.

== Influence & Political Impact in Indonesia ==
Jalanan became the first documentary in Indonesian history to receive a full theatrical release in commercial cinemas across the country. It screened for 34 consecutive days at theaters in five major Indonesian cities.

Jalanan enjoyed additional prominence and media attention when it was screened in April 2014 by Jakarta's Governor Basuki Tjahaja Purnama ('Ahok') at City Hall for 300 senior government officials. The same week, Abraham Samad, the Chairman of Indonesia's Corruption Eradication Commission (KPK) hosted a special screening at the institution's office in central Jakarta.

== Accolades ==
Jalanan won the 2013 Busan International Film Festival award for Best Documentary.

Jalanan won the 2014 Melbourne International Film Festival's People's Choice Award for Best Documentary

Jalanan won the Richard Leacock Award for Best First Feature Film at the 2014 Biografilm Festival in Bologna, Italy.

Jalanan won the Best Documentary award at the 2014 Shanghai Television Festival, China.

Jalanan director Daniel Ziv won the IFDC (Indonesia Film Director's Club) Award for Best Direction in a First Feature Length Film, 2014.

Jalanan won the Audience Award at the 2014 ChopShots Southeast Asian Film Festival in Jakarta, Indonesia.

Jalanan won the 2013 Jogja-NETPAC Asian Film Festival Special Mention award.
