= Chun Woo-hee =

South Korean actress (born 1987)

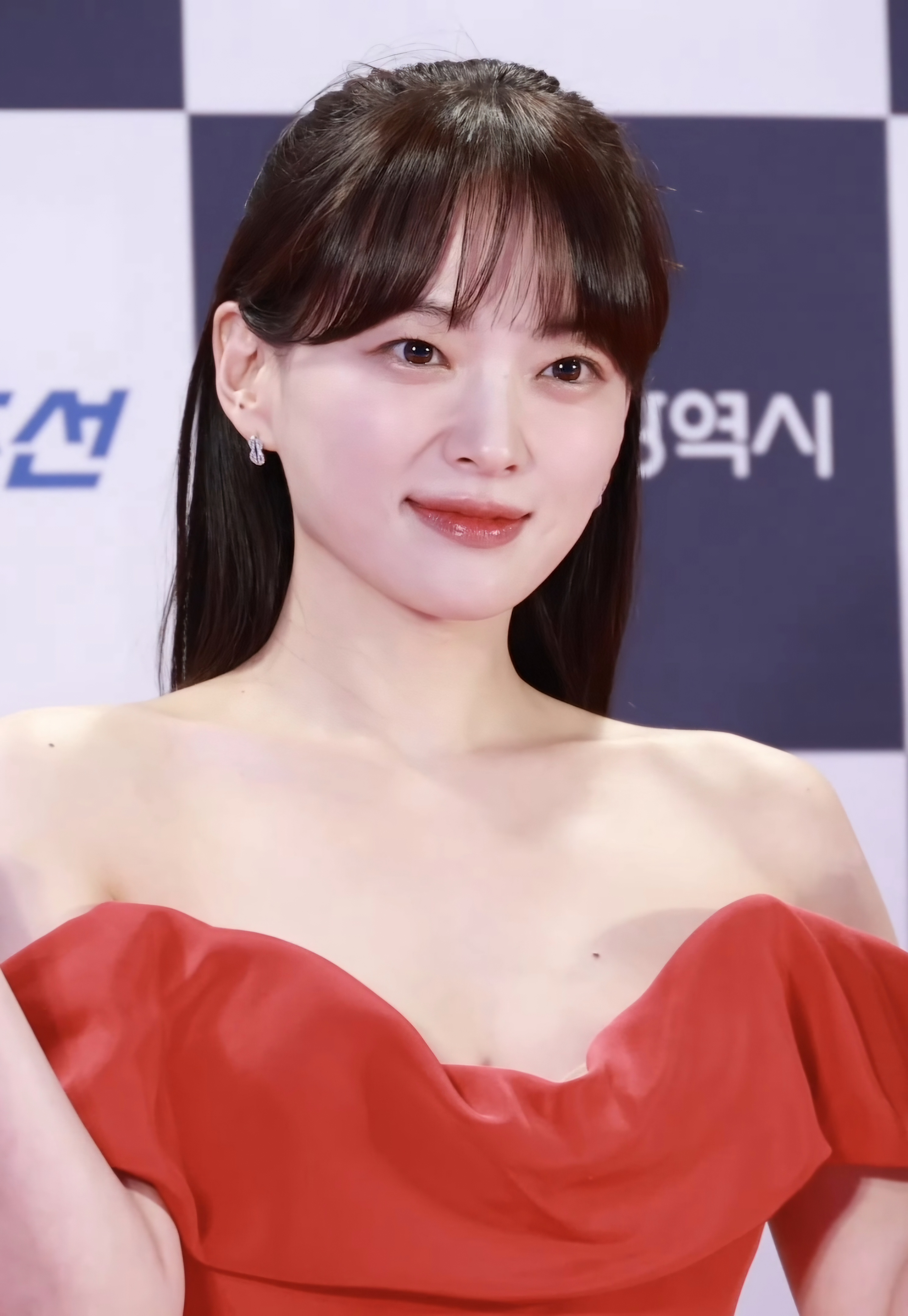
- Chun in July 2024
- Born: April 20, 1987 (age 39); Icheon, South Korea
- Education: Kyonggi University (Department of Acting)
- Occupation: Actress
- Years active: 2004–present
- Agent: Blitzway Entertainment

Korean name
- Hangul: 천우희
- RR: Cheon Uhui
- MR: Ch'ŏn Uhŭi

Chun Woo-hee (Korean: 천우희; born April 20, 1987) is a South Korean actress. She made her acting debut in 2004, but first drew attention with her supporting role as a rebellious teenager in the box-office hit Sunny (2011). Her other notable roles include the films Han Gong-ju (2013) and The Wailing (2016), as well as the television series Be Melodramatic (2019) and The 8 Show (2024).

== Early life and education ==
Chun entered the acting department at Kyonggi University in 2006.

== Career ==
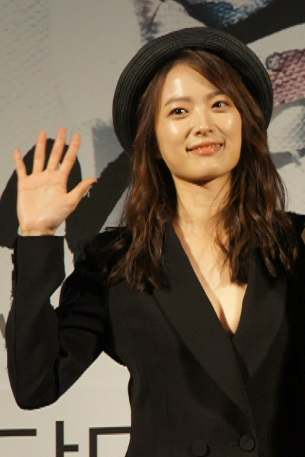
Chun in 2013

In 2014, Chun received critical acclaim for her leading role as the title character in Han Gong-ju, a coming-of-age indie film about a traumatized young woman trying to move on with her life after a tragedy. The film was inspired by the infamous Miryang gang rape case of 2004.

== Philanthropy ==
On February 11, 2023, Chun donated ₩20 million to help 2023 Turkey–Syria earthquakes, by donating money through Hope Bridge National Disaster Relief Association.

In March 2025, Chun donated ₩40 million to the Hope Bridge National Disaster Relief Association for the 2025 wildfire victims in the Ulsan, Gyeongbuk, and Gyeongnam regions.

== Filmography ==
=== Film ===
Year	Title	Role	Notes	Ref.
2004	Love, So Divine	Girl		
2007	Herb	Ggetip 2 (Note: Girls with their bangs clipped to the side.)		
2009	Mother	Mi-na		
2010	The Boy from Ipanema	Friend		
2011	Sunny	Sang-mi		
2011	My Sweet Fucking Sixteen	Ji-na	Short film	
2012	As One	Hyun Jung-hwa's younger sister		
2012	In Between	Jeon Na-ri	Segment: "Mineral Water"	
2012	26 Years	Kwon Jung-hyuk's older sister	Cameo	
2014	Thread of Lies	Mi-ran		
2014	Han Gong-ju	Han Gong-ju		
2014	Cart	Mi-jin		
2015	The Piper	Mi-sook		
2015	The Beauty Inside	Woo-jin		
2016	Love, Lies	Seo Yeon-hee		
2016	The Wailing	Mu-myeong		
2017	One Day	Mi-so		
2018	Heung-boo: The Revolutionist	Seon-chool	Cameo	
2019	Idol	Choi Ryeon-hwa		
2019	Vertigo	Seo-young		
2019	The Little Princess	Teacher Park	Special appearance	
2021	Waiting for Rain	So-he		
2022	Anchor	Se-ra		
2022	I Want to Know Your Parents	Song Jung-wook / Teacher		
2022	Rustle	Se-yeong	Short film	
2023	Unlocked	Lee Na-mi		

=== Television series ===
Year	Title	Role	Notes	Ref.
2010	The Woman Who Still Wants to Marry	Lee Shin-young's junior colleague	Bit part	
2011	Vampire Idol	Woo-hee		
2017	Argon	Lee Yeon-hwa		
2019	Be Melodramatic	Im Jin-joo		
2023	Delightfully Deceitful	Lee Ro-woom		
2024	The Atypical Family	Do Da-hae		
2024	The 8 Show	Se-ra		
2025	My Youth	Sung Je-yeon		

=== Web series ===
Year	Title	Role	Ref.
2014	Remarkable Woman	Woo-hee	

=== Television shows ===
Year	Title	Role	Notes	Ref.
2022	The Disappeared School	Narrator	New Year's Special EBS Documentary	

== Accolades ==
=== Awards and nominations ===
Name of the award ceremony, year presented, category, nominee of the award, and the result of the nomination
Award ceremony	Year	Category	Nominee / Work	Result	Ref.
Asian Film Critics Association Awards	2017	Best Supporting Actress	The Wailing	Nominated	
Baeksang Arts Awards	2015	Best New Actress (Film)	Han Gong-ju	Won	
Baeksang Arts Awards	2017	Best Supporting Actress (Film)	The Wailing	Nominated	
BloodGuts UK Horror Awards	2016	Best Actress in an International Film	The Wailing	Nominated	
Blue Dragon Film Awards	2011	Best Supporting Actress	Sunny	Nominated	
Blue Dragon Film Awards	2014	Best Leading Actress	Han Gong-ju	Won	
Blue Dragon Film Awards	2016	Best Supporting Actress	The Wailing	Nominated	
Blue Dragon Film Awards	2022	Best Actress	Anchor	Nominated	
Blue Dragon Series Awards	2024	Best Actress	The 8 Show	Nominated	
Buil Film Awards	2014	Best New Actress	Han Gong-ju	Nominated	
Buil Film Awards	2014	Best Actress	Han Gong-ju	Nominated	
Buil Film Awards	2015	Best Supporting Actress	The Piper	Nominated	
Buil Film Awards	2016	Best Supporting Actress	The Wailing	Nominated	
Buil Film Awards	2019	Best Actress	Idol	Nominated	
Buil Film Awards	2022	Best Actress	Anchor	Nominated	
Chunsa Film Art Awards	2015	Best Actress	Han Gong-ju	Nominated	
Chunsa Film Art Awards	2017	Best Supporting Actress	The Wailing	Nominated	
Chunsa Film Art Awards	2022	Best Actress	Anchor	Nominated	
Director's Cut Awards	2014	Best New Actress	Han Gong-ju	Won	
Director's Cut Awards	2025	Best Actress in Series	The 8 Show	Nominated	
Golden Cinema Festival	2014	Most Popular Actress	Han Gong-ju	Won	
Golden Cinematography Award	2021	Best Actress	Waiting for Rain	Won	
Grand Bell Awards	2011	Best Supporting Actress	Sunny	Nominated	
Grand Bell Awards	2014	Best Actress	Han Gong-ju	Nominated	
Grand Bell Awards	2016	Best Supporting Actress	The Wailing	Nominated	
Grand Bell Awards	2017	Best Actress	One Day	Nominated	
KOFRA Film Awards	2015	Best Actress	Han Gong-ju	Won	
KOFRA Film Awards	2015	Discovery Award	Han Gong-ju	Won	
Korean Association of Film Critics Awards	2014	Best Actress	Han Gong-ju	Won	
Max Movie Awards	2015	Best Actress	Han Gong-ju	Won	
Wildflower Film Awards	2015	Best Actress	Han Gong-ju	Won	
Women in Film Korea Awards	2014	Best Actress	Han Gong-ju	Won	

=== State honors ===
Name of the organization, year presented, and the award given
Country	Ceremony	Year	Award	Ref.
South Korea	The Korean Popular Culture and Arts Awards (Note: Honors are given at the Korean Popular Culture and Arts Awards, arranged by the Korea Creative Content Agency and hosted by the Ministry of Culture, Sports and Tourism. They are awarded to those who have contributed to the arts and South Korea's pop culture.)	2024	Prime Minister Commendation	

=== Listicles ===
Name of publisher, year listed, name of listicle, and placement
Publisher	Year	Listicle	Placement	Ref.
Cine21	2014	Actress of the Year	1st	
Cine21	2014	New Actress of the Year	1st	
