= Cinesapiens =

- Directed by: Edgar Pêra
- Written by: Edgar Pêra
- Produced by: Rodrigo Areias
- Starring: Nuno Melo, Leonor Keil, Jorge Prendas, Keith Davis
- Cinematography: Luis Branquinho
- Release date: 2013
- Country: Portugal
- Languages: Portuguese, English

Cinesapiens is a 3D film by Edgar Pêra: a musical krypto-history of the Spectator, from the cave to holo-cinema. Cinesapiens is a segment of the feature 3X3D with 2 other films by Jean-Luc Godard and Peter Greenaway, and premiered at the closing night of La Semaine de la Critique of the Cannes Film Festival 2013.
