= Fabricated City =

2017 film by Park Kwang-hyun

- Theatrical release poster
- Hangul: 조작된 도시
- RR: Jojakdoen dosi
- MR: Chojaktoen tosi
- Directed by: Park Kwang-hyun
- Written by: Park Kwang-hyun; Oh Sang-ho
- Produced by: Kim Hyun-cheol; Jang Yeong-hwan
- Starring: Ji Chang-wook; Shim Eun-kyung; Ahn Jae-hong
- Cinematography: Nam Dong-geun
- Edited by: Kim Jin-oh
- Music by: Kim Tae-seong
- Production company: TPS Company
- Distributed by: CJ Entertainment
- Release date: February 9, 2017
- Running time: 126 minutes
- Country: South Korea
- Language: Korean
- Box office: US$18.3 million

Fabricated City (Korean: 조작된 도시; RR: Jojakdoen dosi; lit. 'Manipulated City') is a 2017 South Korean action crime film directed by Park Kwang-hyun and starring Ji Chang-wook, Shim Eun-kyung and Ahn Jae-hong. The film was released on February 9, 2017.

== Plot ==
In Yeosu City, Kwon Yoo, formerly a national taekwondo champion, spends most of his time playing games at an Internet Cafe. In an online first-person shooter, his character "Captain" is highly skilled and has a group of close friends and teammates who call themselves "RESURRECTION." After a gaming session, he finds a smartphone, whose owner calls him, promising him money for going to the owner's apartment to return it. Kwon complies, takes the money placed beforehand in the apartment's living room and leaves.

The next day, Kwon is arrested and accused of killing a young girl. The evidence seems irrefutable: The murder weapon is in his house, his fingerprints and DNA are in her apartment and the apartment's security camera has footage of him. Following pressure from the media, the court swiftly finds him guilty and sentences him to life imprisonment in a maximum security prison. In prison, Kwon catches the attention of sadistic gang leader Ma Duk-su, and Kwon is beaten on his first days. His mother visits him, assures him she is fighting for his freedom and encourages him to endure.

Helped and advised by an older sympathetic inmate, by day Kwon eats as much as possible during mealtime, survives group attacks by Ma and his gang by defensively protecting his vital organs, and by night retrains himself in his physical fitness and taekwondo skills. Kwon eventually fights back, using his self-made rubber slingshot, nail-paper darts and regained taekwondo skills to beat Ma and his gang.

After receiving news that his mother has committed suicide, Kwon breaks out of prison, triggering a national manhunt. He goes to the office of Min Chum-sang, the public attorney who defended him. Min gives Kwon Yoo his mother's necklace, saying he will re-examine his case. Kwon is contacted by Yeo-wool, one of his RESURRECTION teammates. She takes him to her house on the city outskirts. They are soon joined by his other teammates. Yeo-wool has researched the case, found many irregularities in the supposed "evidence" and gathered the team to help Kwon clear his name. The team examines recent high-profile violent crimes and via security camera footage, finds a truck parking close to all crime scenes.

Following this lead, Kwon arrives at the apartment of Noh Joon-young, a rising TV actor, and finds his corpse. Hiding in a corner, Kwon witnesses a team of "specialists" creating a crime scene, following a narrative of "rabid fan stalking, killing and embalming her idol." Unbeknownst to Kwon, the apartment is being surveilled by Min, who is the mastermind behind the framing. Noh's real killer is found to be the daughter of a wealthy businessman known as "Chairman Chu," who hires Min to find a scapegoat. Using a massive intelligence-gathering supercomputer hidden in his apartment block, Min finds an appropriate candidate, a girl named So, and sends a team to drug her and collect her hair, saliva and blood that they use to fake the crime scene.

Later, they lure her to Noh's apartment and finish the narrative. Similarly, Kwon's "victim" was killed by the son of a wealthy client, and Kwon was made the scapegoat. After tracking So, the team bugs her phone and finds Min's accomplice. Kwon attempts to kidnap the accomplice but is captured by Ma, who was freed thanks to Min manipulating prison records. Yeo-wool saves Kwon and drives him to safety. Wondering how Ma found him, Yeo-wool finds a tracker inside his mother's necklace and realizes Min is involved. After RESURRECTION sabotages Min's operation, Kwon confronts Min at his "command center." After beating Min up, he begins transferring Min's data (including surveillance footage of his victims and call logs with his client) using Yeo-wool's thumb drive.

Min implies the suicide of Kwon's mother was actually a murder set up by Min. Min then reveals that Ma is at Yeo-wool's safehouse and has captured his teammates. Unable to wait for the data transfer, Kwon rushes back in time to save his teammates. Evading Ma's gang, Min's subordinates and the police, the group rush to a TV station. On the way, they learn that Min has manipulated the media into painting his team as a "psychotic crime ring." The team distracts the pursuers, while Yeo-wool sets up her equipment. Eventually everyone except Yeo-wool is captured. As Min celebrates, his command center shuts down, and he realizes Yeo-wool's thumbdrive has finished its job.

With the evidence found in Min's computer, Yeo-wool and the two hitherto absent team members put together a presentation. They block the TV station's regular broadcast and begin presenting the facts, detailing Min's involvement, his clients and how they framed their victims. Min is arrested, although it is implied there is a greater force behind him. Kwon is cleared of all charges and let go. In the final scene, the group is at a gathering, chatting and eating happily.

== Cast ==
- Ji Chang-wook as Kwon Yoo
- Shim Eun-kyung as Yeo-wool
- Ahn Jae-hong as Demolition
- Oh Jung-se as Min Cheon-sang
- Kim Sang-ho as Ma Deok-soo
- Lee Hanee as Cheon-sang's secretary
- Kim Ki-cheon as Beauty of space
- Kim Min-kyo as Daoshi Yong
- Choi Gwi-hwa as Chief prison guard
- Geum Kwang-san as Deok-soo's right-hand man
- Kim Seul-gi as Eun-Pye
- Kahlid Elijah Tapia
- Park Kyung-hye
- Jung Soo-man
- Yoo Seung-ok
- Bae Min-jung
- Han Ji-eun
- Woo Hyun

== Production ==
The film marks director Park Kwang-hyun's return after directing the hit film Welcome to Dongmakgol 12 years ago. The film also marks Ji Chang-wook's film debut as lead actor.

Filming began on July 1, 2015 in Yongsan, Seoul, South Korea and finished on December 29, 2015 in Seoul.

According to CJ Entertainment will be opening in 31 countries including five where it will be distributed directly by CJ. The film was sold to 26 regions at the European Film Market held during the Berlin International Film Festival. The film will launch in Australia and New Zealand in February, Hong Kong in March, Malaysia in April and Thailand in May. It will also be shown in Taiwan, Italy and India, Vietnam, Indonesia and North America.

== Reception ==
The film topped local box office and surpassed 1 million admissions on its opening weekend. The Hollywood Reporter praised the film for its action scenes but called the plot ungainly. Similarly, Screen Anarchy called the film a mediocre piece hidden behind big-budget thrills.

== Awards and nominations ==
Year	Award	Category	Recipient	Result
2017	53rd Baeksang Arts Awards	Best New Actor	Ji Chang-wook	Nominated
2017	53rd Baeksang Arts Awards	Most Popular Actor	Ji Chang-wook	Nominated
2017	2017 Korean Film Shining Star Awards	Popularity Award	Ahn Jae-hong	Won
