= 3x3D =

- Film poster
- Directed by: Jean-Luc Godard; Peter Greenaway; Edgar Pêra
- Written by: Jean-Luc Godard; Peter Greenaway; Edgar Pêra
- Produced by: Rodrigo Areias
- Cinematography: Fabrice Aragno; Reinier van Brummelen; Luís Branquinho
- Edited by: Raphaël Lefèvre
- Music by: Jorge Prendas; Marco Robino
- Production company: Fundação Cidade de Guimarães
- Distributed by: Fundação Cidade de Guimarães; Urban Distribution
- Release date: 23 May 2013 (Cannes)
- Running time: 69 minutes
- Countries: Portugal; France
- Languages: French; English; Portuguese

3x3D is a 2013 anthology film comprising three short 3D films directed by French/Swiss filmmaker Jean-Luc Godard, British filmmaker Peter Greenaway and Portuguese filmmaker Edgar Pêra. It was released in France April 30, 2014 after being presented at the closing night of Critics' Week of the 2013 Cannes Film Festival in May. It also screened at the 2013 Vancouver International Film Festival.

The film was commissioned by the city of Guimarães in Portugal at the time of its designation as European Capital of Culture in 2012.

== Segments ==
- Just in time directed by Peter Greenaway
- Cinesapiens directed by Edgar Pêra
- Les Trois Désastres directed by Jean-Luc Godard

== Cast ==
=== Just in Time ===
- Miguel Monteiro as Gil Vicente, Pope John XXI, Bishop Barbosa and The Wineman

=== Cinesapiens ===
- Carolina Amaral
- Keith Davis
- Leonor Keil
- Ângela Marques
- Nuno Melo
- Jorge Prendas
- Pedro J. Ribeiro

== Critical reception ==
Film critic Serge Kaganski called Peter Greenaway's short film technically ruffling but cinematically zero. Jean-Michel Frodon praised Jean-Luc Godard's film, calling it virtuoso and innovative. Peter Debruge called it "little more than a vanity commission to celebrate the EU selecting Guimaraes, Portugal, as its European Capital of Culture for 2012."
