= 10 Minutes (2013 film) =

- Theatrical poster
- Directed by: Lee Yong-seung
- Written by: Kim Da-hyun
- Produced by: Kim Dong-ho
- Starring: Baek Jong-hwan; Kim Jong-gu
- Cinematography: Seong Sung-taek
- Edited by: Kim Woo-il; Shin Yong-sik
- Music by: Angelo Lee; Kim Hong-hee
- Production company: Tiger Cinema
- Distributed by: Lotte Entertainment
- Release dates: October 2013 (BIFF); April 24, 2014 (South Korea)
- Running time: 93 minutes
- Country: South Korea
- Language: Korean

10 Minutes (Korean: 10분; Hanja: 10分; RR: Sipbun) is a 2013 South Korean film directed by Lee Yong-seung. It premiered at the 2013 Busan International Film Festival and was released in theaters on April 24, 2014.

== Plot ==
Kang Ho-chan is studying and preparing for his dream job as a TV station producer. Barely scraping by since his father's retirement, his family has high hopes for him. However, he fails time and time again to get into the station and eventually ends up getting a part-time job at a government office to support his family. One day, one full-time employee resigns and Ho-chan's boss offers him a permanent position. Ho-chan hesitates between his long-time dream of becoming a producer and a steady job. After thinking long and hard, he chooses to be realistic and take the offer, but someone else gets appointed for the job.

== Cast ==
- Baek Jong-hwan as Kang Ho-chan
- Kim Jong-gu as Director
- Jeong Hee-tae as Union director
- Lee Si-won as Song Eun-hye
- Jang Liu as Han Young-mi
- Jeong Seung-gil as Jeong Yong-jin
- Seong Min-jae as Noh Jeong-rae
- Yoon Joon-woo as Jo Hyeon-woo
- Kwon Oh-jin as Director
- Kang Eun-woo as New intern
- Choi Seok-won as Employee 1
- Yoo Jae-hong as Employee 2
- Park Geun-tae as Male interviewer
- Kim Hak-jae as Ho-chan's father
- Lee Seong-kyeong as Ho-chan's mother
- Jo Yong-cheol as Ho-young
- Kwon Gwi-bin as Noo-ri
- Park Joo-hwan as Tae-in
- Choi Joon-hyeok as Dong-seok
- Kim Min-young as Director of Fine arts academy
- Cheon Sa-myeong as Store clerk of mountain-climbing clothing store
- Jang Woo-jin as Police officer 1
- Kim Bo-mook as Police officer 2
- Lee Wook-hyeon as Drunk 1
- Ahn Seul-gi as Drunk 2

== Awards and nominations ==
10 minutes premiered in the New Currents section of the 18th Busan International Film Festival in 2013, where it picked up the KNN Movie Award (Audience Award) and the FIPRESCI Award.

In 2014, it won the Cyclo d'Or, the top prize at the 20th Vesoul International Film Festival of Asian Cinema; the FIPRESCI Award at the 38th Hong Kong International Film Festival; the Asian New Talent Award at the 17th Shanghai International Film Festival; and the Grand Prize at the 16th Taipei Film Festival.

In 2015, Lee Yong-seung became a Best New Director nominee at the 20th Chunsa Film Art Awards. He also won Best New Director at the 2nd Wildflower Film Awards, where 10 Minutes was nominated for three other categories: Best Director (Narrative Film) for Lee Yong-seung, Best Screenplay for Kim Da-hyun, and Best New Actor for Baek Jong-hwan.
