= Miryang gang rape =

2004 gang rape in Miryang, South Korea

Miryang middle school girl gang rape case
- Native name: 밀양지역 여중생 집단 강간 사건
- Date: 2004
- Location: Miryang, South Gyeongsang Province, South Korea
- Type: Sexual violence; gang rape
- Perpetrator: Male high school students

Korean name
- Hangul: 밀양지역 여중생 집단 강간 사건
- Hanja: 密陽地域女中生集團强奸事件
- Revised Romanization: Miryang-jiyeok yeojungsaeng jipdan ganggan sageon
- McCune–Reischauer: Miryang-jiyŏk yŏjungsaeng chiptan kanggan sagŏn

The Miryang middle school girl gang rape case was a series of gang rapes that occurred in Miryang, South Korea in 2004. As many as 44 male high school students gang raped female high-schoolers over the course of 11 months. The case caused a public outcry due to police mistreatment of the victims and the offenders' light punishments.

== Background ==
The victims lived in Ulsan and Changwon, while the perpetrators were from Miryang and Changwon. The perpetrators were initially believed to be members of a high school gang, but little evidence for this was found.

They reached the first 14-year-old victim over the phone. When she met the offenders, she was sexually assaulted, the whole scene being filmed in order to blackmail her.

According to police, she was raped up to 10 times by three to 24 high school boys at each occurrence. At least 44 boys were involved in the attacks over a period of 11 months.

The girl was ordered to bring her 13-year-old sister and 16-year-old cousin to Miryang the next time, where the cousin was assaulted. The original police report stated that the younger sister was sexually assaulted as well, but it may only have been a physical assault. The attackers extorted money from their victims.

After the sisters' aunt reported the rapes to the police, three of the boys were arrested. Following protests from the victims and public, another nine students were arrested, and 29 charged. Family members of the perpetrators threatened the victims, warning them that they should "watch out for reporting our sons to police." In a television interview, a parent of one of the offenders stated, "Why should we feel sorry for the victim's family? Why don't you consider our suffering? Who can resist temptation when girls are trying to seduce boys? They should have taught their daughters how to behave in order to avoid this kind of accident." One girl reportedly quit school after repeated visits and verbal abuse from the offenders' parents.

== Investigation ==
A controversy erupted over allegations that the police had mistreated the victims, culminating in a candlelight vigil by 150 protesters. The victims had asked to be questioned by a female police officer, but their request was refused. One police officer allegedly said to the victims, "Did you try to entice the guys? You ruined the reputation of Miryang. The boys who would be leading the city in the future are now all arrested thanks to you. What are you going to do? [...] I am afraid that my daughter will turn out like you."

Police also leaked enough information to the media for the victims to be identified. Furthermore, police forced the victims to identify the suspects face-to-face, rather than through a one-way mirror, with an officer asking one of the victims, "Did he insert [it] or not?" One of the victims had to be hospitalized for psychiatric treatment after these experiences.

In August 2007, the Seoul High Court found the Miryang police officers guilty of negligence in protecting the victims, and ordered them to pay damages totaling ₩50 million to two of the victims and their families. The decision was upheld by the Supreme Court of South Korea in June 2008, which set the compensation at ₩70 million.

Prosecutors sent most of the accused to juvenile court or dropped charges. Ten others were formally accused of group sexual assault, with prosecutors asking for two to four years imprisonment with a three-year stay of execution. Citing the young age of the offenders and the fact that some had already been admitted to college or hired for jobs, the judges refused to press charges against even these ten, instead sending them to Juvenile Court. One factor in this decision was that the father of one of the victims formed an agreement with some of the offenders to plead for their leniency after receiving a large sum of money from them. The man was an alcoholic who had divorced the victim's mother three years prior due to his domestic violence, but retained parental rights over his daughter, and persuaded her to accept the agreement. Ultimately, only five suspects were sent to a youth detention center, and none were convicted of criminal charges.

== Public response ==
When the case first came to light on December 7, 2004, internet users started making posts criticizing the educational system and stating that the perpetrators should be severely punished.

Reports came out on December 8 that among the 44 perpetrators, an arrest warrant had been issued for only three, to which netizens responded "arrest all of the perpetrators," and they began to turn their fury on the police.

== Aftermath ==
In 2012, it emerged that the female friend of one of the perpetrators had become a police officer, and this outraged many people given that the policewoman had insulted and derided the victims when the crimes had come to light.

=== 2024 doxing of perpetrators' identities ===
Interest in the case was re-ignited in 2024 when a YouTuber posted videos and doxed the identities of some of the perpetrators. Subsequently, other YouTubers also joined in, exposing more identities. One of the perpetrators, surnamed Park, was found to be a restaurant owner married with a daughter, while another, surnamed Shin, worked in a car dealership and was subsequently fired from his job after the company was told of his past crimes. A third was sentenced in 2018 to eight months' jail for working as a loan shark. It also emerged that some of these perpetrators, aged in their late 30s, held stable jobs and had families of their own, and some of them also had daughters. Public opinion was scathing of the culprits when the incident re-emerged public, in large part due to the fact that these culprits were living happily, not having had to confess their crimes or suffer guilt, and not even having faced legal punishment for the crimes.

In addition to the identities of some of the perpetrators, the identities of people alleged to be their relatives were disclosed as well. A nail salon owned by the alleged girlfriend of one of the perpetrators was targeted, but she claimed she had never known the perpetrator, and would be taking legal action for the damage to the business and her reputation. By June 11, the police had received three complaints and 13 petitions for defamation filed by not only the perpetrators, but also by other individuals whose identities were revealed. Despite claims by various YouTubers that the victim agreed to the release of the identities, the Korea Sexual Violence Relief Center, which claimed to represent the victim, did not agree to have the identities released.

== In popular media ==
- Han Gong-ju, a film inspired by these events
- Signal, the Inju Gang Rape case in this series was partially based on this event
