= Syd Lim =

South Korean filmmaker (born 1970)

- 임승용
- Born: October 20, 1970 (age 56); South Korea
- Other name: Im Seung-yong
- Education: Yonsei University: Bachelor of Korean Literature; Master of Korean Literature
- Occupations: Actor; Producer
- Years active: 2003–present

Korean name
- Hangul: 임승용
- RR: Im Seungyong
- MR: Im Sŭngyong

Syd Lim, also credited in eastern name order as Im Seung-yong (Korean: 임승용; Born October 20, 1970), is a South Korean film actor, planner, and producer.

Lim started his filmmaking career at Walt Disney, where he worked for two and a half years in the fields of film distribution, marketing, and copyright management. Afterward, he joined Bear Entertainment, marking his producing debut with film Humanist (2001). In 2003, he established SIO Film. Then, in 2009, Lim sold SIO Film to Barunson E&A and joined the company, assuming the dual roles of CEO of SIO Film and Vice President (head of Barunson's film division).

In 2012, Syd Lim established Yong Film. Since 2022, Yong Film has become a subsidiary of CJ ENM. After the merger and acquisition in October 2023, Yong Film has become a label under CJ Studio, with Syd Lim as the CEO of the label.

He has developed and produced projects based on comics, novels, and classic tales, including Park Chan-wook's Old Boy (2003) and The Handmaiden (2016), as well as Kim Dae-woo's The Servant (2010), among others.

== Early life and education ==
Lim developed an interest in cinema during high school, specifically citing the influence of the MBC's film program, Weekend Masterpiece. When his parents emigrated to the United States, Lim remained in South Korea to pursue his education. During university breaks spent in the U.S., he studied international cinema by renting videos from USC Library and UCLA Library. His early influences included French films like René Clément's Purple Noon which starred Alain Delon, and Claude Lelouch's A Man and a Woman. Lim reportedly watched Akira Kurosawa's Rashomon more than 30 to analyze its structure and also studied the filmography of Alfred Hitchcock.

Lim graduated from Yonsei University with a degree in Korean Language and Literature. He chose to renounce his U.S. green card to complete his mandatory military service in South Korea, serving a term of two years and two months.

Following his military discharge, Lim joined the direct distribution agency for Walt Disney Korea. During his two and a half years at the company, his responsibilities included reviewing upcoming scripts and participating in overseas promotional tours. This period provided foundational experience in film distribution, copyright management, and marketing within the commercial industry. During his time at Disney, he pursued his studies in the Graduate School of Korean Language and Literature at Yonsei University. His master's thesis, titled 'A Study on Scenario Adaptation of a Novel – Focusing on "The Aimless Bullet" (1961)', analyzed the differences between the screenplay of Yu Hyun-mok's film adaptation of The Aimless Bullet and the original novel by Yi Bom-seon.

== Career ==
=== Early career (2000–2003) ===
Following his tenure at Walt Disney Korea, Lim transitioned into film production. This shift coincided with the death of his mother, who had been a primary supporter of his career goals. During this period, screenwriter Kim Dae-woo encouraged Lim to leave the distribution sector to pursue active filmmaking in Chungmuro. Lim has described this transition as an essential period of practical learning, citing Kim's advice that firsthand experience in the industry's challenges was necessary to understand the production process.

Lim joined Bear Entertainment under CEO Lee Seo-yeol. He made his debut as a producer with the 2001 film The Humanist (2001), directed by Lee Moo-young. During this production, Lim began a professional association with the film's screenwriter, Park Chan-wook.

In 2003, Lim produced the romantic comedy Spring Bears Love through E-son Film. Directed by Yong Yi and starring Bae Doo-na and Kim Nam-jin, the film follows a retail employee who discovers a series of love letters hidden in library art books and attempts to identify their author. The narrative incorporates elements of romantic mystery and fantasy, and was adapted from the French novel Le Souligneur (The Underliner) by Caroline Bongrand.

After a junior colleague recommended the manga Old Boy by Garon Tsuchiya and Nobuaki Minegishi, Lim acted quickly. He pitched the project to director Park Chan-wook and secured actor Choi Min-sik before flying to Japan. Within two weeks of discovering the source material, Lim obtained the film rights from Futabasha. He finalized the primary production agreement just two days later. As general producer, Lim managed every phase of the project, from storywriting and filming to international scheduling. He built the production team around long-term collaborators, including screenwriter Hwang Jo-yoon, a classmate of eight years, and director Park Chan-wook.

The resulting film, Oldboy, follows Oh Dae-su (Choi Min-sik) as he seeks revenge against Lee Woo-jin (Yoo Ji-tae) after being mysteriously imprisoned for 15 years. During his violent pursuit, he falls in love with a sushi chef named Mi-do (Kang Hye-jung), and is recognized as an influential cult classic. The film earned widespread critical acclaim for its story and technical direction. Its single-shot action sequence remains one of its most praised features.

=== SIO Film and Barunson (2003–2011) ===
The success of Oldboy brought Korean cinema to the attention of film enthusiasts worldwide, leading Lim to establish his own film production company, Sio Film (시오필름). The production company was already registered as a corporation. Lim had plans to change his title to CEO from the next work. However, Lim continued working as a producer until his next project. He considered the science fiction genre and aimed to create a company that could consistently produce two or three films a year.

SIO Film made its debut in film production with founding work Crying Fist (2005), directed by Ryoo Seung-wan. It was the first Korean film to receive permission to film inside a prison. With a net production cost of 3.9 billion won, it was co-produced with T Film and Bravo Entertainment. The film was showcased in Directors' Fortnight section of the 2005 Cannes Film Festival. The film garnered a total of 1,728,477 admissions nationwide.

Lim proceeded to produce The Beast and The Beauty (2005), Project Makeover (2006), and Big Bang (2007). However these films received a lukewarm response from audiences.

T Entertainment CEO Kim Tae-eun made an announcement on March 15, 2007, stating that the company would acquire Siofilm. Through the acquisition of existing shares, T Entertainment obtained a 29.3% stake in Siofilm, which accounted for a total of 190,832 shares, at a cost of 2.29 billion won. As part of the transaction, Sio film's CEO Lim allocated 1.825 billion won of the stake sale amount to a third party.

Then, in 2009, Lim made the decision to sell Sio Film to Barunson E&A and joined the company, assuming the dual roles of CEO of Sio Film and Vice President (head of Barunson's film division).

Lim's first project in his dual roles at Barunson was Director Jeong Yong-ki's The Righteous Thief. The film centers around a modern-day family of robbers, comprising Hong Moo-hyuk (Lee Beom-soo), a high school music teacher and the 18th-generation descendant of Hong Gil-dong, his father Hong Man-seok (Park In-hwan), his mother Seok Myeong-ae (Kim Ja-ok), and his younger brother Hong Chan-hyuk (Jang Ki-bum). Other key characters include Hong Moo-hyuk's lover Song Yeon-hwa (Lee Si-young), prosecutor Song Jae-pil (Sung Dong-il), and detective Lee Jeong-min (Kim Su-ro).

It was followed by The Servant, a 2010 South Korean historical romantic drama directed and written by Kim Dae-woo. Starring Kim Joo-hyuk, Jo Yeo-jeong and Ryoo Seung-bum, the film offers a unique perspective on the renowned Korean folktale Chunhyangjeon by narrating the story from the viewpoint of Lee Mong-ryong's servant, the male protagonist. The film surpassed 1 million viewers within a week of its release, and then surpassed 2 million within 17 days. Despite the June 2 local elections and the South Africa World Cup, the film achieved great success at the box office, attracting a total of 3,014,523 viewers.

Lim once again collaborated with Kim Joo-hyuk in the 2011 film Couples. Directed by Jeong Yong-ki, Couples is a romantic comedy film that serves as a remake of Kenji Uchida's 2005 Japanese film A Stranger of Mine. The screenplay for the movie was adapted by Lee Gae-byok. The film features an ensemble cast including Kim Joo-hyuk, Lee Yoon-ji, Lee Si-young, Oh Jeong-se, and Gong Hyeong-jin. Notably, this movie marks the screen debut of Lee Yoon-ji who had previously worked in theater. The production of Couples were led by producer duo, Seo Woo-sik and Syd Lim.

=== Yong film ===
In August 2012, Lim established the film production company Yong Film ((주)용필름). The company's motto, "Crazy, Story, Imagination," is displayed beneath its logo. To define the studio's identity, Lim collaborated with three directors to select words that represented their shared workplace. Park Chan-wook chose "Crazy" to capture the essence of chaos and passion. Jung Ji-woo reflecting the company's emphasis on narrative development and its collaborative process with directors. Finally, director Baikproposed "Imagination," which resonated with Lim's preference for films that stimulate the viewer's mind rather than relying solely on realism. Baik, a close associate of Lim, noted that these three terms collectively align with the producer's creative philosophy. Together, these phrases signify Yong Film's commitment to these qualities in its future productions.

First work of Yong Film was the action thriller film The Target. This movie is a remake of Fred Cavayé's 2010 French film Point Blank. Initially, Jeon Jae-hong was slated to direct the project, but ultimately, it was handed over to Yoon Hong-seung (who also goes by the pseudonym Chang). The screenplay was penned by writer Jeon Cheol-hong. Co-produced by Barunson, the film later secured a production and supply contract with a budget of approximately 4.2 billion won, in collaboration with CJ E&M. The partnership between the two companies stipulated a 20% share of the net profit upon its realization. The movie generated significant buzz in Chungmuro even before production commenced, thanks to the involvement of esteemed actors such as Ryu Seung-ryong, Yoo Jun-sang, Jo Yeo-jeong, Kim Seong-ryeong, Lee Jin-wook, Jin Goo, and Jo Eun-ji.

The Target was also showcased out of competition in the Midnight Screenings section at the 2014 Cannes Film Festival. It was released on April 30, 2014, and despite placing third at the box office, it had a solid opening, behind The Fatal Encounter (another Korean film released on the same day) and The Amazing Spider-Man 2. In its first week, The Target attracted 1.35 million admissions and earned ₩6.63 billion (US$6.46 million), capturing a market share of 21.5%. On its second week, the film rose to second place at the box office, accumulating a total of over 2 million admissions from 716 screens nationwide.

Lim and Baik met for the first time while working on Oldboy, where Lim served as a producer and Baik handled the title design. Despite a long-standing friendship, they had not previously discussed collaborating on a film. After viewing the 2012 American social film The Beauty Inside, Baik recommended it to Lim. Lim subsequently contacted Baik to offer him the opportunity to direct a Korean adaptation. Although initially hesitant, Baik accepted the offer due to the project's unique subject matter. The film marked Baik's feature film debut following a career in commercial directing.

The Beauty Inside is a romantic comedy centered on Woo-jin, a man who wakes up in a different body every day. Only his mother, Moon-sook, and his friend, Sang-baek, portrayed by Lee Dong-hwi, are aware of his condition. The plot follows Woo-jin as he falls in love with Lee Soo, played by Han Hyo-joo, and decides to reveal his secret to her. The film features a cast of 123 individuals portraying Woo-jin, 21 prominent actors such as Kim Dae-myung, Do Ji-han, Bae Seong-woo, Park Shin-hye, Lee Beom-soo, Park Seo-jun, Kim Sang-ho, Chun Woo-hee, Ueno Juri, Lee Jae-jun, Kim Min-jae, Lee Hyun-woo, Jo Dal-hwan, Lee Jin-wook, Hong Da-mi, Seo Kang-jun, Kim Hee-won, Lee Dong-wook, Go Ah-seong, Kim Joo-hyuk, and Yoo Yeon-seok. Many of the 21 actors who played Woo-jin participated in the work due to their relationship with Lim. The Beauty Inside was released on August 20, 2015, in South Korea. The film earned a total gross of US$14,291,242 and recorded 2,057,896 ticket admissions during its theatrical run.

Lim and Lee Gae-byok first collaborated on the 2003 film Oldboy, where Lee served as an assistant director and Lim acted as the producer. This professional relationship continued with Lim's subsequent production, Luck Key, an action-comedy directed by Lee and starring Yoo Hae-jin. The film is an adaptation of Kenji Uchida's Japanese comedy film Key of Life. Luck Key was released on October 13, 2016. Before its debut, the investment company estimated a target audience of approximately 2.5 to 3 million viewers, with 2.5 million set as the break-even point. However, the film significantly outperformed expectations, reaching 6.8 million admissions by November 14. Ultimately, it exceeded 6.9 million viewers, becoming one of the highest-grossing films in South Korea.

=== Collaboration with Park Chan-wook's Moho Film: The Handmaiden ===
After reading Sarah Waters' novel Fingersmith, Lim sought to adapt the work into a film. At the time, the novel's only previous adaptation was a BBC drama Fingersmith (2005) starring Sally Hawkins and Elaine Cassidy. Lim recommended the novel to Park Chan-wook, who subsequently read it with his wife. While Park was considering a follow-up project to his film Thirst, his wife suggested, "Why don't you do Fingersmith?" Lim acquired the film rights in 2012. However, because Park had already committed to directing the Hollywood film Stoker, he asked Lim to postpone the project. In 2013, Park invited Sarah Waters to attend the London premiere of Stoker, where they discussed the upcoming adaptation. Waters did not provide any specific instructions or constraints for the film's development.

Although Sarah Waters' novel Fingersmith takes place in 1860s Victorian England, Lim suggested relocating the adaptation to 1930s Korea and Japan. The story follows a noble heiress (Kim Min-hee), a con man posing as a count (Ha Jung-woo), and a pickpocket (Kim Tae-ri) who becomes the heiress's maid. Structured in three parts, the film first explores Sook-hee's perspective on a scheme to defraud Hideko, then shifts to Hideko's own traumatic background. While the opening act aligns with the original novel, the later segments diverge significantly to reach a unique conclusion. Park Chan-wook assembled several of his frequent collaborators for the production. Writer Jeong Seo-kyeong co-wrote the screenplay, while production designer Ryu Seong-hie, editor Kim Jae-bum, and cinematographer Chung Chung-hoon directed the film's technical and aesthetic execution. The Handmaiden received widespread critical acclaim and numerous accolades, including the BAFTA Award for Best Film Not in the English Language. Critics praised the film for its intricate plot twists, beautiful cinematography, and the performances of its principal cast.

=== Yong's film pivotal years ===
After 12 years, Lim and Choi Min-shik reunited for the Korean film Heart Blackened, which is a remake of Fei Xing's Chinese film Silent Witness. This project marked their third collaboration following Old Boy and Crying Fist. The film also served as a reunion for director Jeong Ji-woo and Choi Min-shik, who had previously worked together 18 years earlier on Happy End (1999). In Heart Blackened, Choi Min-sik portrays Lim Tae-san, a powerful man whose life is upended when his daughter, Mira, is accused of murdering his fiancée, Yoo-na. Driven to prove his daughter's innocence, Lim hires a young, idealistic lawyer and navigates an intense courtroom battle to uncover the truth behind a missing seven-hour window. The case reaches a turning point when a devoted fan of the victim emerges with pivotal CCTV footage, forcing Lim to confront unexpected revelations. Following discussions with director Jeong Ji-woo, Lim invited Lee Chung-hyun to contribute to the screenplay adaptation. Lim had been impressed by Lee's short film Bargain and recognized his potential as a writer and filmmaker. Rather than immediately tasking Lee with directing a feature, Lim chose to have him develop his skills by contributing to the script for Heart Blackened first.

Yong Film followed with Believer, an action crime film directed by Lee Hae-young. A remake of Johnnie To's Drug War, the project originated from several years of informal meetings between Lim and Lee. Although Lee had no prior experience in the action genre, Lim proposed the film because he admired Lee's specific directorial style. The film was the final performance of Kim Joo-hyuk, who died before its release. Lim personally suggested Kim for the role of the villain Jin Ha-rim, having urged the actor to take on a darker character since their collaboration on The Servant. Released on May 22, 2018, with an extended version following in July, Believer became a pivotal success for Yong Film by drawing 5.2 million viewers.

In 2019, Yong Film released its first original screenplay, Cheer Up, Mr. Lee, which follows a mentally disabled man named Cheol-soo (Cha Seung-won) who discovers he has a sick daughter, Saet-byeol, and joins her on an unexpected journey. The project underwent a 15-year development process, originating as a collaboration between director Lee Gae-byok and Old Boy assistant director Han Jang-hyuk. Although the script originally focused on a mother and son, Lim encouraged Lee Gae-byok to direct the film, leading Lee to rewrite the story as a father-daughter narrative based on his own personal experiences.

Lim produced The Call, director Lee Chung-hyun feature debut. A psychological thriller, it was adaptation of the 2011 British-Puerto Rican film The Caller, which originally premiered in Korea in 2012. The story follows two women, Seo-yeon (Park Shin-hye) and Young-sook (Jeon Jong-seo), who live in the same house but exist twenty years apart. After they connect through a mysterious phone call, their attempts to alter their respective pasts and futures lead to increasingly dangerous consequences. Although The Call was initially intended for a theatrical release, these plans were canceled due to the COVID-19 pandemic, and the film subsequently premiered as a Netflix original in November 2020.

Following The Call, Lim and Yong Film collaborated with Samsung to produce the short film Heart Attack!, a romantic time-travel story starring Lee Sung-kyung. Director Lee Chung-hyun accepted the project immediately, reuniting with the staff of The Call and cinematographer Kim Sang-il. The production team filmed the entire project over three days using five Galaxy smartphones. The short film, which depicts a woman's effort to save her lover by reversing time, was released exclusively on the streaming service Watcha on October 6.

Continuing his focus on original stories, Lim produced 20th Century Girl, the second feature film from Yong Film to be based on an original screenplay. Directed by Bang Woo-ri, the script was inspired by the director's personal youth in Cheongju and her experiences exchanging diaries with a friend. Set in 1999, the film stars Kim You-jung, Byeon Woo-seok, Park Jung-woo, and Roh Yoon-seo in a narrative centered on friendship and first love. The project furthered Yong Film's relationship with global streaming platforms, premiering exclusively on Netflix on October 21, 2022.

=== Yong film as label under CJ Studio ===
In February 2022, CJ ENM acquired a stake in Yong Film through a mutual transfer, officially making the company a subsidiary within its Film Division. Following this initial investment, CJ ENM announced a broader consolidation plan in October 2022 to bring its various production houses, including Yong Film, under the umbrella of the newly established CJ ENM Studios. The consolidation process involved CJ ENM Studios acquiring all remaining shares of its subsidiaries to achieve 100% ownership. During the merger and acquisition phase, CJ ENM Studios acquired Yong Film shares for approximately KRW 15.886 billion. This transaction resulted in a personal payout of that same amount for Lim, as the CEO of Yong Film.

Yong Film held its annual event, Yong Night, on December 7, 2022, marking its first such gathering since becoming a label under CJ ENM Studios. During the event, Lim revealed the company's upcoming production lineup, which included several feature films in development and multiple projects for OTT platforms. Among the highlighted projects is The Jailbreaker (working title), a collaboration with director Park Chan-wook. Based on Michael Robotham's novel Life or Death, the story follows a man who escapes from prison just one day before his scheduled release. The film is a co-production between Yong Film and Park's Moho Film, with Park serving as both director and screenwriter. The lineup also includes a series tentatively titled Mangnaein, directed by Kim Jee-woon and Park Bo-ram. The project is an adaptation of the crime novel Second Sister by Hong Kong author Chan Ho-kei. Yong Film is partnering with Anthology Studio and SK Global to produce the series.

In 2023, Yong Film released Believer 2, an action crime film directed by Baik. As a sequel to the 2018 film Believer, the story follows the character Won-ho as he searches for "Rak" following the arrest of Brian, further exploring the inner workings of an elusive drug cartel. The film features an ensemble cast including Cho Jin-woong, Cha Seung-won, Han Hyo-joo, Oh Seung-hoon, Kim Dong-young, and Lee Joo-young. It premiered at the 28th Busan International Film Festival in the 'Korean Cinema Today - Special Premiere' section on October 5, 2023, before its global release on Netflix on November 17, 2023.

Additionally, Syd Lim is collaborating with Lionsgate Television and Park Chan-wook to develop an English-language television adaptation of the 2003 film Oldboy. Lim and Park will both serve as producers for the series. The project is being supervised by Lionsgate executives Courtney Mock and Tara Joshi, following negotiations led by Bryan Weiser.

== Personal life ==
Lim's spouse, Jeong Yeon-hee, is a graduate of Sookmyung Women's University with a degree in Library Science. A former librarian, she currently serves as an advisor to Lim, evaluating various scripts and collaborating on film projects.Jeong also frequently travels abroad for professional purposes. Lim's father, Lim Hae-hom, served as the chairman of Rock Heaven. Lim has two younger brothers, Lim Yeon-sung and Hugh Lim.

As a cinephile, Lim's hobbies include collecting film CDs and DVDs. He also curates a collection of various liquors, with a particular affinity for whiskey, and is a collector of fountain pens.

== Filmography ==
Key
†	Denotes films that have not yet been released

=== Film ===
Film filmmaking credits
Year	Title		Credited as			Director	Notes	Ref.
Year	English	Korean	Planner	Executive Producer	Producer	Director	Notes	Ref.
2001	The Humanist	휴머니스트	Syd Lim	Syd Lim	—N/a	Lee Moo-young	Bear Entertainment	
2003	Spring Bears Love	봄날의 곰을 좋아하세요?	Syd Lim	—N/a	—N/a	Yi Yong	Eson Film	
2003	Oldboy	올드보이	Kim Jang-uk; Syd Lim	Syd Lim	Park Chan-wook	Park Chan-wook	Show East; Egg Film; CJ Entertainment	
2005	Crying Fist	주먹이 운다	—N/a	—N/a	Kim Jang-uk; Syd Lim; Park Jae-hyeong	Ryoo Seung-wan	SIO Film; Bravo Entertainment	
2005	The Beast and the Beauty	야수와 미녀	—N/a	—N/a	Syd Lim	Lee Gae-byok	SIO Film	
2007	Project Makeover	언니가 간다	—N/a	—N/a	Kim Tae-eun; Syd Lim	Kim Chang-rae	SIO Film	
2007	Big Bang	쏜다	—N/a	Syd Lim	Kim Tae-eun; Syd Lim	Park Jung-woo	SIO Film	
2009	The Righteous Thief	홍길동의 후예	—N/a	Syd Lim	Ham Jeongyeop; Syd Lim; Bae Seong-eumn	Jeong Yong-ki	Another Life Company, SIO Film	
2010	The Servant	방자전	—N/a	Syd Lim	Seo Woo-sik; Mun Yang-Kwon; Syd Lim	Kim Dae-woo	Sio Film Co., Ltd. Barunson E&A Co., Ltd.	
2011	Couples	커플즈	—N/a	Syd Lim	Seo Woo-sik; Syd Lim	Jeong Yong-ki	Sio Film Co., Ltd. Barunson E&A Co., Ltd.	
2012	Mr. XXX-Kisser	아부의 왕	—N/a	Syd Lim	—N/a	Jung Seung-gu	Magic Lamp Co., Ltd.	
2014	The Target	표적	Syd Lim	Syd Lim	Seo Woo-sik; Syd Lim; Park Tae-joon	Chang	Yong Film Co., Ltd. Barunson E&A Co., Ltd.	
2015	The Beauty Inside	뷰티 인사이드	Syd Lim	Syd Lim	Syd Lim	Baik	Yong Film	
2016	Luck Key	럭키	Syd Lim	Syd Lim	Syd Lim	Lee Gae-byok	Yong Film	
2016	The Handmaiden	아가씨	Syd Lim	Park Chan-wook; Syd Lim; Kim Tae-eun	Park Chan-wook; Syd Lim	Park Chan-wook	Yong Film	
2017	Heart Blackened	침묵	Syd Lim	Syd Lim	Syd Lim	Jung Ji-woo	Yong Film	
2018	Believer	독전	Syd Lim	Syd Lim	Syd Lim	Lee Hae-young	Yong Film	
2019	Cheer Up, Mr. Lee	힘을 내요, 미스터 리	Syd Lim	—N/a	Syd Lim	Lee Gae-byok	Yong Film	
2020	The Call	콜	—N/a	—N/a	Syd Lim	Lee Chung-hyun	Yong Film; Netflix	
2020	Heart Attack	하트어택	—N/a	—N/a	Syd Lim	Lee Chung-hyun	Yong Film; Watcha	
2022	20th Century Girl	20세기 소녀	—N/a	—N/a	Syd Lim	Bang Woo-ri	Yong Film; Netflix	
2023	Believer 2	독전 2	—N/a	—N/a	Syd Lim	Baik	Yong Film; Netflix	
2024	My Name Is Loh Kiwan	로기완	Syd Lim	—N/a	Syd Lim	Kim Hee-jin	Yong Film; Netflix	
TBA	New Human War: Resurrection Man †	신인류 전쟁: 부활남	Syd Lim	—N/a	Syd Lim	Baik	Yong Film; Superpick	
TBA	Jeongga's Ranch †	정가네 목장	Syd Lim	—N/a	Syd Lim	Kim Ji-hyun	Yong Film	
TBA	The Jailbreaker †	더 제일브레이커	Syd Lim	—N/a	Syd Lim	Park Chan-wook	Yong Film and Moho Film	
TBA	Milky Way †	은하수	Syd Lim	—N/a	Syd Lim	TBD	Yong Film	
TBA	One Table †	원 테이블	Syd Lim	—N/a	Syd Lim	TBD	Yong Film	
TBA	The Third Man †	제3의 남자	Syd Lim	—N/a	Syd Lim	Yu Kwang-gyung	Yong Film	
TBA	Black Box †	블박	Syd Lim	—N/a	Syd Lim	TBD	Yong Film	
TBA	Lady Seven †	레이디 세븐	Syd Lim	—N/a	Syd Lim	TBD	Yong Film	
TBA	Today †	오늘	Syd Lim	—N/a	Syd Lim	Yoon Dae-won	Yong Film	

=== Web series ===
Web series credits
Year	Title		Planner	Director	Production House	Ref.
Year	English	Korean	Planner	Director	Production House	Ref.
2025	Mercy for None	광장	Syd Lim	Choi Seong	Yong Film; Netflix Korea	
2025	Romantic Anonymous	로맨틱 어나니머스	Syd Lim	Sho Tsukikawa	Yong Film; Netflix Japan	
2026	Unfriend †	언프렌디	Syd Lim	Kim Jee-woon; Park Bo-ram	Yong Film; Anthology Studio; SK Global	
TBA	Lucky Girl †	럭키걸	Syd Lim	Kim Ji-hyun	Yong Film	
TBA	Believer 0 †	독전0	Syd Lim	Baik	Yong Film	
TBA	Spaceship Doctor †	우주선 닥터	Syd Lim	—N/a	Yong Film	
TBA	At the End of the Repeated Time Loop, Reflected in Your Eyes †	반복되는 타임리프 끝에 네 눈동자에 비치는 사람은	Syd Lim	Bang Woo-ri	Yong Film	
TBA	Swimming Class for Mermaids †	인어를 위한 수영교실	Syd Lim	Bang Woo-ri; Kim Soo-hyung	Yong Film	
TBA	Ukishima-ho Project †	태극기 휘날리며	Syd Lim	Kang Je-gyu	Yong Film; M Makers	
TBA	Star of Judas †	유다의 별	Syd Lim	—N/a	Yong Film	
TBA	Burning Day †	버닝데이	Syd Lim	—N/a	Yong Film	
TBA	Oldboy †	올드보이	Syd Lim; Park Chan-wook; Courtney Mock; Tara Joshi	Park Chan-wook	Moho Film; Yong Film; Lionsgate Television	

== Accolades ==
=== Awards and nominations ===
Awards and nominations
Award ceremony	Year	Category	Nominee / Work	Result	Ref.
Grand Bell Awards	2005	Best Planning	Crying Fist	Nominated	
BAFTA Film Award	2018	Best Film Not in the English Language	The Handmaiden (Note: Shared with Park Chan-wook)	Won	
Chicago Independent Film Critics Circle Awards	2017	Best Foreign Film	The Handmaiden	Won	

=== Listicle ===
Name of publisher, year listed, name of listicle, and placement
Publisher	Year	List	Placement	Ref.
Cine21 Film Awards	2016	Producer of the Year	Won	
