= Joo Won-gyu =

South Korean Writer

- Born: 1975 (age 50–51); Seoul, South Korea
- Education: Chongshin College and Theological Seminary (M.div.equ); Graduate School Theological Seminary of Gangseo University (Th.M)
- Occupations: Pastor; Novelist; Scriptwriter
- Years active: 2001–present
- Employer: Dongseo Malseum Church
- Agent: Writer of Finecut (WAF)
- Awards: 14th Hankyoreh Literary Award for 'A Cruel History of an Outsider Race'

Korean name
- Hangul: 주원규
- RR: Ju Wongyu
- MR: Chu Wŏn'gyu

Joo Won-gyu (Korean: 주원규; born 1975) is a South Korean novelist, screenwriter, and pastor.

He serves as the director of the Institute for Shared Culture, focusing on everyday art, cultural discoveries, and small-group Bible studies. Best known for his socially conscious fiction and crime dramas, Joo won the 14th Hankyoreh Literary Award for his novel A Cruel History of an Outsider Race. His other notable novels include Bad God, The Watchtower, Anti-Human Declaration, and A Christmas Carol, alongside youth fiction such as Hideout. His non-fiction works span essays, cultural criticism—such as Sanctuary and Babel—and theological studies, including translating The Talmud closest to the original source as a researcher of Jewish texts.

As a screenwriter, he wrote the 2017 tvN drama series Argon and Disney+ Gangnam B-Side. Since 2017, he has been represented by the writer's agency Writer of Finecut (WAF).

== Early life ==
Joo was born in 1975 in Seoul to a devout Buddhist mother, though he converted to Christianity during his third year of elementary school. His adolescence involved significant turbulence. During middle school, he became a target of school bullies and was forced into the role of a "bread shuttle." To protect himself, he aligned with a group of delinquents and became a subordinate to the school gang leader. His teenage years involved frequent disciplinary issues, to the point where school authorities ultimately recommended that he drop out.

His entry into literature began modestly. Joo began writing novels at age eighteen in high school, receiving encouraging feedback from peers that inspired him to continue. Despite this early passion, he initially pursued a technical path, enrolling in engineering school. However, he felt continually drawn back to writing by a persistent personal momentum.

Joo majored in electrical engineering at Seoul National University of Science and Technology. He spent his time isolating himself in the library to read books outside his major, eventually dropping out because the field did not align with his goals. After attending three or four different theological colleges, he completed his studies at a seminary affiliated with the General Assembly and was ordained as a minister in March 2009. He eventually settled into ministry, serving as a pastor who runs an alternative church..

In 2003, one of his short stories won the New Year Literary Contest held by the Gwangju Daily News, though he maintained an independent path without formal ties to the literary establishment. He later published System, a political thriller novel centered around the internet.

== Career ==
=== As writer ===
Joo Won-kyu won the 14th Hankyoreh Literary Award in 2009 for his novel A Cruel History of an Outsider Race, beating 211 competitors. From the preliminary judging stages, the work received praise for its bold settings, compelling characters, and provocative themes. The judges noted that Joo appeared to operate outside the traditional university creative writing establishment. While they identified flaws such as rough prose and structural echoes of films and video games, they concluded these did not diminish his narrative competence or the raw energy of the book, prompting the panel to remark, "I wonder who this person is."

"The simultaneous eruption events in the cross-sections of life are converging into dark sketches of our society. The inexorable style and youthful imagination are creating a new form of 'totality'."

— Hwang Kwang-soo, a literary critic, about novel 'A Cruel History of an Outsider Race', Khan Newspaper

That same year, Joo was ordained as a minister and founded a church, beginning a tenure in pastoral leadership that lasted seven years. Following his literary debut, he maintained a prolific output across multiple genres, including full-length novels, cultural criticism, autobiographies, interviews, youth novels, and fairy tales, publishing more than twenty books. Drawing on his academic background in engineering, he has also occasionally worked as an electrician.

In 2012, following the unexpected death of his wife, Joo began ministering to out-of-school youth in shelters and correctional facilities. His wife had dedicated herself to supporting runaway youth prior to their marriage, and after her passing, he chose to honor and continue her legacy.

In 2015, after losing contact with twenty runaway teenagers he had previously counseled, Joo tracked them to a nightclub district in Gangnam. To locate them, he spent six months working undercover inside a Gangnam club, eventually reconnecting with most of the youths. He discovered that many of the young men were working as guards or hosts, while most of the young women were trapped in prostitution. Despite his intervention, he was unable to convince them to leave. Joo concluded his undercover operation after six months, grappling with a sense of failure for not being able to reintegrate the teenagers into mainstream society. Exposed to daily criminality, he began to feel psychologically compromised by the environment and concluded he had to leave immediately. On February 28, he published an account of his experiences in the novel Made in Gangnam, released by Neofiction.

=== As screenwriter ===
In 2017, Joo co-wrote the tvN journalism drama Argon alongside Jeon Young-shin and Shin Ha-eun. Directed by Lee Yoon-jung and starring Kim Joo-hyuk and Chun Woo-hee, the series follows investigative reporters striving to uncover the truth through verifiable facts in a media landscape saturated with misinformation. Since 2017, Joo has been represented by the writer's agency Writer of Finecut (WAF).

On December 7, 2022, at the Yong Film Night event, it was announced that veteran director Kim Jee-woon and director Park Bo-ram would co-direct an OTT series tentatively titled Mangnaein, adapted from the crime novel Second Sister by Hong Kong author Chan Ho-kei. The series is produced by Yong Film in collaboration with Anthology Studio and SK Global. In 2023, Joo announced via social media that he serves as the screenwriter for the adaptation.

== Bibliography ==
=== Novel ===
Year	Title		Publisher	Published Date	ISBN	Ref.
Year	English	Korean	Publisher	Published Date	ISBN	Ref.
2009	System	시스템	Lightning Rod Books	2009-04-10	978-8-9927-2341-1	
2009	A Cruel History of an Outsider Race	열외인종 잔혹사	Hankyoreh Publishing House	2009-07-15	978-8-9843-1341-5	
2010	Invincible bad baseball team	천하무적 불량야구단	Saeum	2010-01-15	978-8-9939-6406-6	
2010	The Watchtower	망루	Literature of Literature	2010-07-31	978-8-9431-0369-9	
2011	The Palace of Fire	불의 궁전	Literature of Literature	2011-12-08	978-8-9431-0387-3	
2012	Anti-human Declaration	반인간선언	Consonants and Vowels	2012-01-03	978-8-9570-7623-1	
2015	Door of Memory	기억의 문	Hankyoreh Publishing House	2015.03.16.	978-8-9843-1886-1	
2016	Christmas Carol	크리스마스 캐럴	Consonants and Vowels	2016-12-20	978-8-9544-3701-1	
2017	Saimdang, Drawing Longing	사임당, 그리움을 그리다	Humanities Academy	2017-01-25	979-1-1865-4228-6	
2017	Bad God	나쁜 하나님	New	2017-09-20	979-1-1871-9257-2	
2019	Made in Gangnam	메이드 인 강남	Neofiction	2019-02-25	978-8-9544-3972-5	
2019	One Kiss Missing	한 개 모자란 키스	Seo Yoojae	2019-10-30	979-1-1890-3422-1	
2019	Anti-human Declaration	반인간선언(증오하는 인간)	Consonants and Vowels	2019-11-07	979-1-1888-5050-1	
2020	Persons subject to special management	특별관리대상자	Hankyoreh Publishing House	2020-02-26	979-1-1604-0362-6	
2021	To people who don't know me	나를 모르는 사람들에게	Hankyoreh Publishing House	2021-06-10	979-1-1604-0604-7	
2022	Seocho-dong League	서초동 리그	Neofiction	2022-01-25	978-8-9544-4801-7	
2023	Naked Body	벗은 몸	Floating	2023-03-10	979-1-1979-2431-6	

=== Audio books ===
Year	Title		Producer	Publication Date	Ref.
Year	English	Korean	Producer	Publication Date	Ref.
2021	Talmud: Today, like the first day, like the last day	탈무드: 오늘 하루 첫 번째 날처럼 마지막 날처럼	Mari Books	2021-08-02	

== Filmography ==
=== Film ===
Film credit
Year	Title		Credited as			Ref.
Year	English	Korean	Original Writer	Screenwriter	Creator	Ref.
2022	Christmas Carol	크리스마스 캐럴	Yes	Co-writing (Note: with director Kim Seong-soo)	No	
2023	Asura: The War of the Beehair	아수라장: 범털들의 전쟁	No	Yes	No	

=== Series ===
Series(s) credit
Year	Title		Network	Credited as			Ref.
Year	English	Korean	Network	Original Writer	Screenwriter	Creator	Ref.
2017	Argon	아르곤	tvN	No	Co-authoring (Note: Co-authoring with authors Joon Young-shin and Shin Ha-eun)	No	
2019	The Lies Within	모두의 거짓말	OCN	Yes (Note: based on novel Anti-Human Declaration by Joo Won-gyu)	No	Yes	
2024	Gangnam B-Side	강남 비-사이드	Disney+	No	Yes	No	
2026	Unfriend	언프렌드	TVING	No	Co-writing (Note: with Kim Jee-woon)	No	

== Awards and nominations ==
Awards and nominations received by Joo
Award ceremony	Year	Category	Nominee / Work	Result	Ref.
The 2nd Ganhyang Architectural Literature Award	2000	Essay	Architecture as a Function of Judgment	Won	
Gwangju Daily Literary Award	2006	Short Story	Knife	Won	
The 14th Hankyoreh Literary Award	2009	Novel	A Cruel History of an Outsider Race	Won	

== See also ==
- South Korean Screenwriter
