= Park Jung-woo =

Park Jung-woo may refer to:

- Park Jung-woo (director), South Korean film director and screenwriter
- Park Jung-woo (actor), South Korean actor
- Park Jeong-woo, member of boy band Treasure
