= Unfriend (South Korean TV series) =

Upcoming South Korean television series

- Hangul: 언프렌드
- RR: Eonpeurendeu
- MR: Ŏnp'ŭrendŭ
- Genre: Thriller
- Based on: Second Sister by Chan Ho-kei
- Written by: Joo Won-gyu
- Directed by: Kim Jee-woon; Park Bo-ram
- Starring: Kim Seon-ho; Park Gyu-young
- Music by: Mowg
- Country of origin: South Korea
- Original language: Korean
- No. of episodes: 6

Production
- Producers: Syd Lim; Choi Jae-won
- Production companies: Yong Film; Anthology Studio; SK Global

Unfriend (Korean: 언프렌드) is an upcoming South Korean television series based on the crime novel Second Sister written by Chan Ho Kei, starring Kim Seon-ho and Park Gyu-young. It is co-directed by Kim Jee-woon and Park Bo-ram, with the screenplay adapted from the novel by novelist and scriptwriter Joo Won-gyu.

== Premise ==
The narrative follows Shin Ga-young, an older sister struggling to come to terms with the death of her younger sister, who took her own life after being targeted by an internet witch hunt. Seeking answers, she eventually meets and hires a mysterious hacker known as In-ho (N) to uncover the truth behind the circumstances leading to her sister's passing.

== Cast ==
=== Main ===
- Kim Seon-ho as In-ho

A mysterious detective and hacker.

- Park Gyu-young as Shin Ga-young

A woman who seeks justice for her younger sister death.

=== Supporting ===
- Lee Hong-nae as Jun-hyuk
- Jin Ho-eun as Jun-su
- Hyun Bong-sik as Detective Mo
- Lee So-i as Hyun-a
- Park Moon-a
- Han Hyun-jun
- Kim Ga-young
- Kang Chae-young
- Kim Ho-jun
- Park Min-yi
- Chang Dan-bi
- Chu Eun-kyung
- Han Chae-yong

== Production ==
=== Development ===
Director Kim Jee-woon (pictured)

On December 7, 2022, at the "Yong Film Night" event, CEO Lim Seung-yong, announced the company's future lineup. Among the projects was an OTT series, tentatively title Mangnaein (망내인; 'In the network'), to be co-directed by Kim Jee-woon and Park Bo-ram. The series is an adaptation of the crime novel Second Sister by Hong Kong writer Chan Ho Kei. Yong Film is producing the series in collaboration with Anthology Studio and SK Global, with the screenplay adapted by Kim and screenwriter Joo Won-gyu.

=== Casting ===
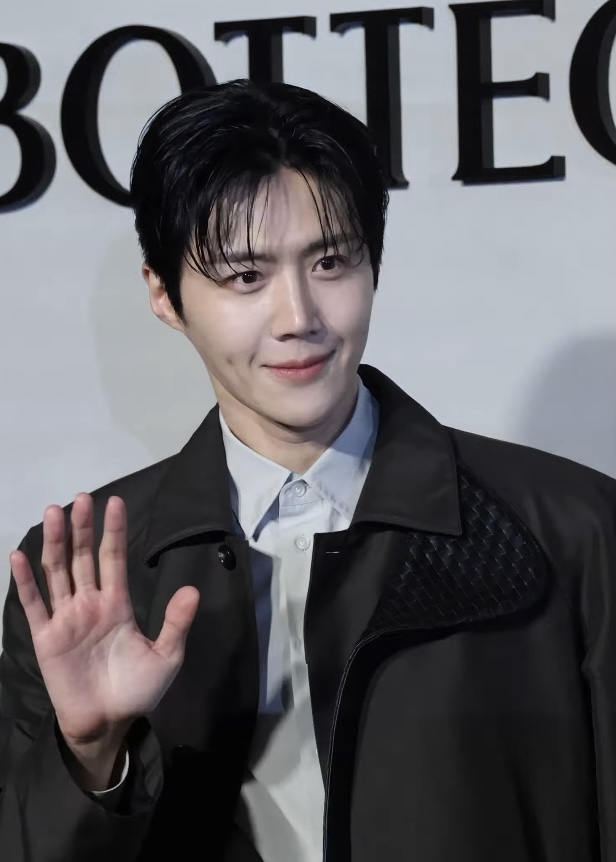
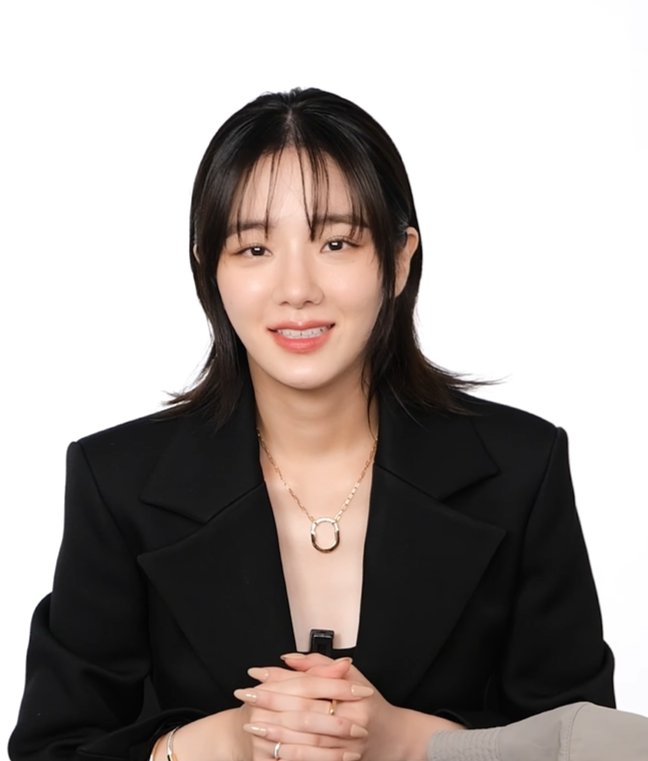
Kim Seon-ho (left) and Park Gyu-young (right)

Casting announcements began on March 16, 2023, with reports that Kim Seon-ho had been offered the lead role. On the same day, JTBC Entertainment News reported that Park Gyu-young had been offered the female lead, with her agency, Saram Entertainment, confirming she was reviewing the offer positively. Park Gyu-young's casting was confirmed in an interview published in July 2023. Park Gyu-young's appearance was confirmed in July, mentioned in one of her interview. In December 2023, while attending the 8th Asia Artist Awards in the Philippines, Kim Seon-ho stated that the series was scheduled to be his primary project for 2024.

In June 2023, Lee Hong-nae is said to join. Park Min-yi was confirmed as a cast member that November.

=== Filming ===
The cast completed their first script reading by June 13, 2023, and full-scale production commenced shortly thereafter. Principal photography concluded in January 2024.

=== Post production ===
Digital Idea was tasked with the series' visual effects, and in September 2024, composer Mowg confirmed he was finalizing the musical score. In March 2025, reports suggested a title change to Unfriend and a potential fourth-quarter release on TVING; however, production representatives clarified that these details were still under internal discussion and had not been finalized. Although SLL included the series in their slate for late 2025, it was subsequently rescheduled as an upcoming project for 2026.
