= Couples (2011 film) =

- Film poster
- Hangul: 커플즈
- RR: Keopeuljeu
- MR: K'ŏp'ŭljŭ
- Directed by: Jeong Yong-ki
- Written by: Lee Gae-byok
- Produced by: Seo Woo-sik; Syd Lim; Kwak Sin-ae
- Starring: Kim Ju-hyuk; Lee Si-young
- Edited by: Moon In-dae
- Music by: Bang Jun-seok
- Distributed by: Sidus Pictures
- Release date: 2 November 2011
- Running time: 110 minutes
- Country: South Korea
- Language: Korean

Couples (Korean: 커플즈) is a 2011 South Korean romantic comedy film directed by Jeong Yong-ki.

== Plot ==
Yoo-suk is looking for his ex-girlfriend who left him with only a text. Ae-yeon has only the diamond ring her lover left when they broke up. Nari continues to wander searching for true love. Bok-Nam is in love with his friend's girlfriend. Byung-chan refuses to believe love exists. When these five hopeless people find their lives intertwining, they discover love and become couples in unexpected ways.

== Cast ==
- Kim Joo-hyuk as Yoo-suk
- Lee Yoon-ji as Ae-Yeon
- Lee Si-young as Nari
- Oh Jung-se as Bok-nam
- Gong Hyung-jin as Byung-chan
- Won Woong-jae as Sang-doo
