= 20th Century Girl =

2022 South Korean romance drama film

- Promotional poster
- Hangul: 20세기 소녀
- Hanja: 20世紀 少女
- RR: 20segi sonyeo
- MR: 20segi sonyŏ
- Directed by: Bang Woo-ri
- Written by: Bang Woo-ri
- Produced by: Syd Lim
- Starring: Kim You-jung; Byeon Woo-seok; Park Jung-woo; Roh Yoon-seo
- Cinematography: Jo Yeong-jik
- Music by: Dalpalan
- Production company: Yong Film
- Distributed by: Netflix
- Release dates: October 6, 2022 (Busan); October 21, 2022
- Running time: 119 minutes
- Country: South Korea
- Language: Korean

20th Century Girl (Korean: 20세기 소녀) is a South Korean coming-of-age romantic drama film written and directed by Bang Woo-ri in her feature film debut, starring Kim You-jung, Byeon Woo-seok, Park Jung-woo, and Roh Yoon-seo. The film depicts the friendship and love between high-schoolers in 1999. It was released on October 21, 2022, on Netflix.

== Plot ==
Set in 1999, the story revolves around Na Bo-ra (Kim You-jung), a seventeen-year-old high school student with a bright personality. Bo-ra's best friend, Yeon-du (Roh Yoon-seo), who has been preparing to visit the US for heart surgery, suddenly declares that she cannot leave as she has fallen in love with a boy from their school whose name she knows as Baek Hyun-jin (Park Jung-woo). Yeon-du had met him in a neighborhood store. The boy was wearing a jacket that didn't belong to him, and therefore, the jacket carried the name tag of "Baek Hyun-jin". This leads Bo-ra to believe that the boy her best friend has fallen for is Baek Hyun-jin. But in reality, Yeon-du has a crush on Poong Woon-ho. Bo-ra is worried about her friend Yeon-du's heart condition. She doesn't want her friend to stay in South Korea for her crush because that would mean passing up the opportunity to get medical treatment. So Bo-ra promises that she will follow Baek Hyun-jin, find out everything about him, and email Yeon-du about what she discovers. Reassured, Yeon-du departs.

At school, Bo-ra starts to follow Hyun-jin. One day, she overhears that Hyun-jin and his best friend Poong Woon-ho (Byeon Woo-seok) will join the broadcasting club at school, so she successfully auditions to join the club. While Woon-ho joins the club, Hyun-jin does not. Bo-ra tries to get close to Woon-ho in order to observe Hyun-jin.

Hyun-jin, mistaken that Bo-ra is interested in him, asks her to date him, only to be rejected by her. Bo-ra would never date the boy that her best friend likes. But she still hasn't found out that Yeon-du is actually crushing on Woon-ho. Meanwhile, Bo-ra realizes that she has fallen in love with Woon-ho, who has developed feelings for her as well. They grow even closer, and share multiple romantic scenes.

When Yeon-du returns to Korea after successful heart surgery, they realize that Bo-ra has been following the wrong boy, and that the real 'Baek Hyun-jin' whom Yeon-du loves is actually Poong Woon-ho, a confusion caused by the boy wearing his friend's school jacket bearing his name tag. Loyal to her friend and protective because of her health condition, Bo-ra conceals that she loves the same Woon-ho. Then Bo-ra starts to avoid Woon-ho so that their blossoming relationship will end, but through Hyun-jin, Yeon-du learns that Woon-ho and Bo-ra like each other. A tearful Yeon-du tells Bo-ra that she can give up Woon-ho for the sake of their friendship, that Bo-ra is the most cherished person to her. Yeon-du is disappointed that Bo-ra was not honest with her and hid her feelings for Woon-ho.

Meanwhile, Woon-ho prepares to move back to New Zealand to resume life with his mother and younger brother. On the day of his departure, with the help of Yeon-du and Hyun-jin, Bo-ra arrives at the train station just in time for them to confess their feelings before separating. They maintain contact through email while Woon-ho plans to attend university in Seoul. There is a conspiracy going around that when the clock strikes midnight on New Years Day, the world will cease to exist. So on December 31st, right before New Years day, Bo-ra waits in anticipation. Woon-ho is still in New Zealand at this point. But when all ends up being fine and Bo-ra sends Woon-ho a celebratory New Years email, she is not responded back to. Without explanation, Woon-ho stops answering all of Bo-ra's emails; she never hears from him again. Heartbroken, confused, and angry, Bo-ra tries to get over him.

Time passes as Bo-ra attends university and matures. She tries to date other guys in her university, but in unsuccessful. One particular evening, she goes on a blind date with a boy, only to realize he has the same name as her first love (Woon-ho). She begins crying uncontrollably in the restaurant, making her date confused. In 2019, she received an invitation to an art exhibition from a person named Joseph, who turns out to be Woon-ho's younger brother, from whom she learns that Woon-ho died in an accident all those years ago. Joseph thanks Bo-ra for remembering Woon-ho and says that the happiest moments in Woon-ho's short life were spent in her company. Bo-ra walks through the exhibit feeling melancholy and nostalgic for their youthful memories and love. As the film ends, Bo-ra views a heartwarming yet heartbreaking video made by Woon-ho that depicts their time together.

The film was named 20th Century Girl because, to Woon-ho, Bo-ra will always have been the girl that he only knew in the 20th century; as he passed away before the new year, before the new century began in the year 2000.

== Cast ==
=== Main ===
- Kim You-jung as Na Bo-ra
  - Han Hyo-joo as adult Na Bo-ra

Seventeen-year-old high school student, a Taekwondo practitioner, and a member of the broadcasting club at her school.

- Byeon Woo-seok as Poong Woon-ho

Bo-ra's classmate and a member of the broadcasting club.

- Park Jung-woo as Baek Hyun-jin

Woon-ho's best friend is a popular man who is liked by his classmates.

- Roh Yoon-seo as Kim Yeon-du

Bo-ra's best friend, who has an unrequited love for Hyun-jin.

=== Supporting ===
- Kim Sung-kyung as Bo-ra's mother
- Jeong Seok-yong as Bo-ra's father
- Lee Cheon-moo as Na Ba-da, Bo-ra's younger brother
- Yoon Yi-re as 'Madam', Bo-ra's classmate
- Jeon Hye-won as 'Darn it', Bo-ra's classmate

=== Special appearance ===
- Lee Beom-soo as a school teacher
- Park Hae-joon as a doctor at the school infirmary
- Ryu Seung-ryong as Poong Woon-ho's father (voice)
- Gong Myung as Jung Woon-ho, Bo-ra's blind date
- Ong Seong-wu as Poong Jun-ho / Joseph, Poong Woon-ho's younger brother
  - Jung Min-joon as young Jun-ho

== Production ==
=== Development ===
Director Bang Woo-ri wrote the script based on her personal experience of exchanging diaries with her friend. The film is set in Cheongju, the director's hometown.

=== Filming ===
Filming took place in Cheongju, North Chungcheong Province from October 2021 to January 2022.

== Release ==
The film was invited to 27th Busan International Film Festival and premiered at 'Korean Cinema Today - Special Premiere' section on October 6, 2022. It was released on Netflix on October 21, 2022.

== Reception ==
=== Viewership ===
A day after its release, 20th Century Girl ranked 7th globally on Netflix's movie category. Subsequently, on 24 October, it ranked 5th in the same category. Within three days of its release, it debuted at 2 on Netflix's global chart of Top 10 non-English movie category for the week of October 17 to 23, with eight million hours viewed. This film has been rated an 86% on the Tomatometer scale on the Rotten Tomatoes website. Along with a 89% rating on the Popcornmeter portion of this site. About 16 thousand fans rated it 4.1 stars on IMDb.

=== Critical response ===
The review aggregator website Rotten Tomatoes reported an approval rating of 86% based on 7 reviews, with an average rating of 7.4/10.

Claire Lee, reviewing for Variety, praised the director for capturing "the feeling of devoted teenage friendships ... while acknowledging how they are inevitably meant to change ... as time goes on," as well as Kim Yoo-jung's portrayal as convincing and delightful Bo-ra, but stated, "the film leaves some of its key characters surprisingly unexplored, despite its two-hour running time." Lee concluded, "Though its potential is not fully realized, '20th Century Girl' does manage to add to the timeworn theme of first love by providing a moving examination of what makes certain moments and certain people unforgettable." In his review in South China Morning Post, James Marsh praised the performance of Kim You-jung as a "dazzling central turn," and described the movie as a "genuinely heartwarming comedy of youthful errors." Giving 3 stars out of 5, Marsh criticized the appearance of adult Bo-ra, stating "[it] gives the film a heavy-handed and wholly unnecessary tragic coda, somewhat takes the wind out of the sails of what is for the most part a genuinely heartwarming comedy of youthful errors." Writing for India Today, Bhavna Agarwal gave the film 3 out of 5 stars, praising Bang Woo-ri's use elements of the 90s to successfully teleports the audience to the last century, her screenplay which keeps the audience hooked, and the charismatic screen presence of Kim Yoo-jung and Byeon Woo-seok. Kim Kyung-hee of MBC appreciated Kim You-jung's portrayal of Na Bo-ra, which undergirds the cute narrative and comic elements without ruining the overall romantic atmosphere. She stated, "This work has a charm that makes you smile as if it were a memory of your own first love," and [the film] "will be imprinted on the audience as "Korea's representative first love movie."

== Accolades ==
=== Awards and nominations ===
Award ceremony	Year	Category	Nominee / Work	Result	Ref.
Baeksang Arts Awards	2023	Best New Actor – Film	Byeon Woo-seok	Nominated	
Buil Film Awards	2023	Best New Actor	Byeon Woo-seok	Nominated	

=== Listicles ===
Name of publisher, year listed, name of listicle, and placement
Publisher	Year	Listicle	Placement	Ref.
Entertainment Weekly	2026	The 16 Best Korean Movies on Netflix	Included	
Marie Claire	2022	The 19 Best Korean Films of 2022	Included	
Ministry of Culture, Sports and Tourism	2023	Most Preferred Korean Films of 2022	5th	
Rolling Stone India	2022	Top 10 Best Korean Movies of 2022	1st	
