= Knuckle Girl =

- Promotional poster
- Directed by: Chang
- Written by: Jung Byeong-sik; Soichiro Ojima
- Screenplay by: Yu Kab-yeol
- Based on: Knuckle Girl by Jun Sang-young and Yoo Sang-jin
- Produced by: Hyunwoo Thomas Kim; Steven Nam
- Starring: Ayaka Miyoshi; Hideaki Itō; Yōsuke Kubozuka
- Cinematography: Takuro Ishizaka
- Edited by: Wang Sung-ik
- Music by: Mok Young-jin
- Production company: Kross Pictures
- Distributed by: Amazon Prime Video
- Release dates: October 25, 2023 (Tokyo); November 2, 2023 (Amazon Prime Video)
- Running time: 108 minutes
- Country: Japan
- Language: Japanese

Knuckle Girl (ナックルガール) is a 2023 Japanese action crime film directed by Chang, starring Ayaka Miyoshi, Hideaki Itō, and Yōsuke Kubozuka in the lead roles. It is based on the Kakao Webtoon of the same name by Sang-young Jun and Sang-jin Yoo. It was released globally on Amazon Prime Video on November 2, 2023.

The film was premiered at the 36th Tokyo International Film Festival in the 'Special Program: The Future of Filmmaking in Japan and Korea' section on October 25, 2023.

== Plot ==
The film follows the story of Ran, who confronts a mysterious organization and corrupt police. Ran discovers a lead of her younger sister Yuzuki’s disappearance that takes her to an underground fighting ring owned by the mysterious organization. Suspecting that her sister may be involved in a crime, Ran decides to confront the organization to uncover the truth. However, things take a turn when Nikaido, a powerful figure in the organization offers to return Ran’s sister on one condition: she must participate in a no-rules deathmatch. Determined to save her sister, Ran trains hard and prepares to take on the challenge. With danger at every turn, Ran must trade in her boxing gloves for brass knuckles and fight with all her might to uncover the truth and save her sister. Will she succeed, and what’s the truth behind her sister’s disappearance?

== Cast ==
- Ayaka Miyoshi as Ran Tachibana
- Hideaki Itō as Haruki Nikaido
- Yōsuke Kubozuka as Seiichiro Shiraishi
- Gōki Maeda as Shun Kamiya
- Kanata Hosoda as Shuji Naruse
- Yoshimasa Kondo as Hidetoshi Tabata
- Satoshi Jinbo as Yoshiyuki Oishi
- Masaki Miura as Masato Suzuki
- Eishin as Kentaro Azuma
- Yukio Naya as Yudai Kito
- Ruka Matsuda as Kanako Handa
- Kotona Minami as Yuzuki Tachibana
- Narimi Arimori as Ran's aunt
- Yuichi Yasoda as Ran's uncle

== Production ==
Based on the Kakao Webtoon of the same name, it is a global project co-produced by Korean production company, Kross Pictures (subsidiary of Kakao Entertainment) and Amazon MGM Studios, featuring South Korean creators and Japanese actors.
