= The Last Stand (2013 film) =

2013 American action thriller film

- Theatrical release poster
- Directed by: Kim Jee-woon
- Written by: Andrew Knauer
- Produced by: Lorenzo di Bonaventura
- Starring: Arnold Schwarzenegger; Forest Whitaker; Johnny Knoxville; Rodrigo Santoro; Jaimie Alexander; Luis Guzmán; Eduardo Noriega; Peter Stormare; Zach Gilford; Genesis Rodriguez
- Cinematography: Kim Ji-yong
- Edited by: Steven Kemper
- Music by: Mowg
- Production companies: Lionsgate Films; di Bonaventura Pictures
- Distributed by: Lionsgate Films
- Release date: January 18, 2013
- Running time: 105 minutes
- Country: United States
- Language: English
- Budget: $45 million
- Box office: $48.3 million

The Last Stand is a 2013 American action thriller film directed by Kim Jee-woon and starring Arnold Schwarzenegger, Forest Whitaker, Johnny Knoxville, Rodrigo Santoro, Jaimie Alexander, Luis Guzmán, Eduardo Noriega, Peter Stormare, Zach Gilford, and Genesis Rodriguez. The film stars Schwarzenegger as a sheriff who attempts to stop a dangerous drug lord from escaping to Mexico through his small town.

The film was Schwarzenegger's first starring role since Terminator 3: Rise of the Machines (2003), and Kim's first English-language film. Filming took place in Belen, New Mexico and Nevada in late 2011. The film premiered on January 14, 2013, at Grauman's Chinese Theatre and was released on January 18, 2013, by Lionsgate Films, receiving mixed reviews from critics and grossing $48.3 million worldwide against a $45 million budget.

== Plot ==
After leading an operation gone terribly wrong, former LAPD narcotics detective Ray Owens moves to the small town of Sommerton Junction, Arizona, where he settles down as sheriff of Sommerton County. Commanding his small force of deputies Jerry Bailey, Sarah Torrance, and Mike Figuerola, the invariably minor crimes Owens handles range from the mayor illegally parking his Chevrolet Camaro to eccentric weapons collector Lewis Dinkum firing off guns at slabs of meat with the deputies.

One night, Gabriel Cortez, an international drug lord and race car driver, is broken out of an FBI prisoner transport in Las Vegas and flees in a modified Chevrolet Corvette C6 ZR1, taking Agent Ellen Richards as his hostage as he attempts to reach Mexico at high speeds. His henchmen and mercenaries cover his escape by destroying a large roadblock in Bullhead City, Arizona, and the FBI loses track of him after he tricks an FBI helicopter, frustrating Agent John Bannister, who suspects a mole helped Cortez.

In the early morning, Owens and his deputies conduct a welfare check on local farmer Parsons, who has missed a regular delivery, and learn he has been murdered. Bailey and Torrance search the farm and discover Cortez's henchman Thomas Burrell and his mercenaries, who are assembling a bridge for Cortez to cross the nearby canyon that marks the U.S.–Mexico border. Owens, alerted to Cortez's approach by Bannister warning law enforcement agencies along the border, tries to order Bailey and Torrance to fall back, but the mercenaries open fire; Owens and Figuerola rescue them, but Bailey is mortally wounded and dies in their retreat.

As Owens and his deputies regroup at the sheriff's station, Bannister dispatches a SWAT team to secure Sommerton Junction, but Cortez outmaneuvers them and forces their vehicles to crash. With no help that could arrive in time before Cortez's arrival, and Burrell and his men preparing to clear out the town by force, Owens rallies Torrance and Figuerola and deputizes Frank Martinez, an Iraq War veteran and Torrance's ex who was in jail that night, to help them in Bailey's place.

At daybreak, Owens and his deputies arm themselves with Dinkum's firearm collection and barricade the town's main road to prepare an ambush. When Burrell and his men arrive to clear the way for Cortez, Figuerola opens fire early to save a civilian and is wounded by a sniper. Covered by Torrance and Martinez, Owens and Dinkum use a Vickers machine gun mounted on the back of a school bus to defeat the mercenaries, and Owens kills Burrell after he injures Dinkum. Cortez arrives and throws Agent Richards from his Corvette before fleeing into a corn field, pursued by Owens in the mayor's Camaro, before both collide with a swather. A dazed Cortez reaches the bridge and is met by Owens, who rejects Cortez's bribe offers and engages him in a brutal fight, eventually managing to incapacitate and handcuff Cortez.

As the FBI and Arizona Department of Public Safety secure Sommerton Junction, Bannister arrives to take Cortez back into custody and arrests Richards, revealed to be the mole, while Figuerola and Dinkum survive and are hospitalized. Torrance gets back together with Martinez, who turns in his badge, originally Bailey's, but Owens allows him to keep it, hiring him as a deputy.

== Cast ==
- Arnold Schwarzenegger as Sheriff Ray Owens
- Forest Whitaker as Agent John Bannister
- Johnny Knoxville as Lewis Dinkum
- Rodrigo Santoro as Frank Martinez
- Jaimie Alexander as Deputy Sarah Torrance
- Luis Guzmán as Deputy Mike Figuerola
- Eduardo Noriega as Gabriel Cortez
- Peter Stormare as Thomas Burrell
- Zach Gilford as Deputy Jerry Bailey
- Genesis Rodriguez as Agent Ellen Richards
- Daniel Henney as Agent Phil Hayes
- Tait Fletcher as Eagan
- John Patrick Amedori as Agent Aaron Mitchell

== Production ==
In June 2009, Lionsgate Films and producer Lorenzo di Bonaventura pre-emptively picked up Andrew Knauer's spec script for The Last Stand. At that time, the script involved Eduardo Noriega's character Gabriel Cortez escaping with a Gumpert Apollo. One year later, South Korean director Kim Jee-woon became attached to the project. Di Bonaventura stated that Kim was invited because he felt that in his filmography he "makes the simple feel rich". Kim in turn declared that he was attracted to the plot of "protecting something important, no matter how small", and having advanced technology being taken down in "analogue ways". Writer Jeffrey Nachmanoff was also brought in to rewrite the script, which di Bonaventura compared the film to a Western, with a small town being attacked by an analogue to a corrupt cattle baron and a weathered veteran trying to stop him.

Liam Neeson was considered for the protagonist, but after he passed in 2011, Lionsgate offered the project to Arnold Schwarzenegger, who had just ended his tenure as Governor of California. His casting was confirmed in July 2011. Schwarzenegger said he considered the project "a lot different for me, even though it's action-packed, because I have to play a guy who's sensitive to my team. And we have lots of laughs like in True Lies." Kim was at first apprehensive to have such a big star in the project, but once both discussed the project he noticed both had the same ideas for Ray Owens, aiming for an everyman instead of a "Terminator like feel". Two weeks later, Lionsgate announced a release date of January 18, 2013.

Filming started on October 17, 2011, in Belen, New Mexico and Nevada. Sommerton was required to be a border town, and Kim also wanted a city that represented "Small Town America". Belen was eventually chosen for having an abandoned area that could be used by the production company for as long as they needed it. Two existing buildings became landmarks of Sommerton, the local hotel and a condemned building that became the diner. Six vacant lots were filled with façades, in which production designer Franco-Giacomo Carbone tried to put a mixture of styles to heighten the appearance of a frontier city with much history. While the producers originally wanted to actually film in Downtown Las Vegas, they eventually found that downtown Albuquerque was visually similar and opted to film there instead, adding the Las Vegas Strip in the background during post-production. The town allowed filming from 6 p.m. to 6 a.m., which did not interrupt local businesses. Jee-woon aimed to "create a distinct look and change the style for every space", with the chaotic environment of the FBI having cold tones and a smarter ambiance, and Sommerton having a "peaceful small town feeling" heightened by warm colors such as yellow and orange.

Given that di Bonaventura had a previous history with General Motors producing the Transformers films, the company provided them with the required muscle cars. For Cortez' escape car, a Chevrolet Corvette C6 ZR1 was picked for being advertised as "the fastest car in a straight line ever made". Eventually, a Camaro was provided for the car that Owens drove during the chase. Seven cars of each model were provided by Chevrolet, with two being returned in pristine shape. The others had varied changes: some had an automated driving system built atop them for the scenes shot from inside the car, others were reinforced for collisions, and a few ended up mounted on rigs - with the Camaro dragged atop the Corvette having all its insides removed to make it lighter. A 24-acre cornfield outside Albuquerque was purchased to serve as the scenery for the climactic chase at the end, and that field was later added to the background of the Sommerton scenes. The chase had the problem of a snowstorm shortly before filming, which made the ground muddy and hard to drive on.

On December 17, 2011, shooting of the film was briefly interrupted, but on January 3, 2012, it continued. The process ended February 2, 2012, and the subsequent post-production continued in Los Angeles.

== Release ==
The Last Stand had its premiere on January 14, 2013, at Grauman's Chinese Theatre. The film was released worldwide on January 17, 2013, and in North America the following day by Lionsgate Films.

== Reception ==
=== Box office ===
The film ranked at number 9 on its debut weekend, taking in $6.3 million. Its theatrical run ended having grossed $12.1 million in America and $36.2 million in other territories for a total gross of $48.3 million. Lionsgate released it on home video in the US on May 21, 2013.

=== Critical response ===
Rotten Tomatoes, a review aggregator, reports that 61% of 168 surveyed critics gave the film a positive review; the average rating is 5.8/10. The site's consensus reads: "There's nothing particularly distinguished about it, but for Schwarzenegger fans The Last Stand provides perfectly undemanding entertainment." Metacritic rated it 54 out of 100 based on 33 critics, indicating "mixed or average reviews". Audiences polled by CinemaScore gave the film an average grade of "B" on an A+ to F scale.

According to Entertainment Weekly critic Owen Gleiberman, "the picture is much better than its promos suggest. It's a crackerjack B movie worthy of comparison to such stylishly low-down, smart-meets-dumb, hyper-violent entertainments as the 1997 Kurt Russell thriller Breakdown, Clint Eastwood's infamous police bloodbath The Gauntlet, John Carpenter's original Assault on Precinct 13, and Arnold's own overlooked 1986 outing Raw Deal. Schwarzenegger gives a controlled and brutally charismatic performance that restores his dignity as a star. He proves — and this is the last thing I was expecting — that there's life after the Governator."

IGN editor Jim Vejvoda rated the film 6 out of 10 and wrote, "The movie's shortcomings are clear whenever anyone is required to speak or act. That may not be the reason why most viewers will go to see The Last Stand, but it's grating enough to chip away at the overall enjoyment of the film. The Last Stand is a formulaic action flick, but it still delivers enough decent car stunts, shoot-outs and fistfights to warrant a look-see for Arnold fans."

Chicago Sun Times' Richard Roeper enjoyed the film, giving it three stars out of four and stating, "If you've got violent-movie fatigue, and you're too exhausted from real-life carnage on the news to enjoy an R-rated blood-fest in which a number of kills are executed as deliberately funny visual punchlines, you do not want to go anywhere near this film. But if you're a fan of stylish, relentlessly loud shootouts, questionable plot developments be damned, this is your ticket to weekend escapism."

== See also ==
- List of American films of 2013
- Arnold Schwarzenegger filmography
