= Ryu Han-bi =

South Korean actress (born 2004)

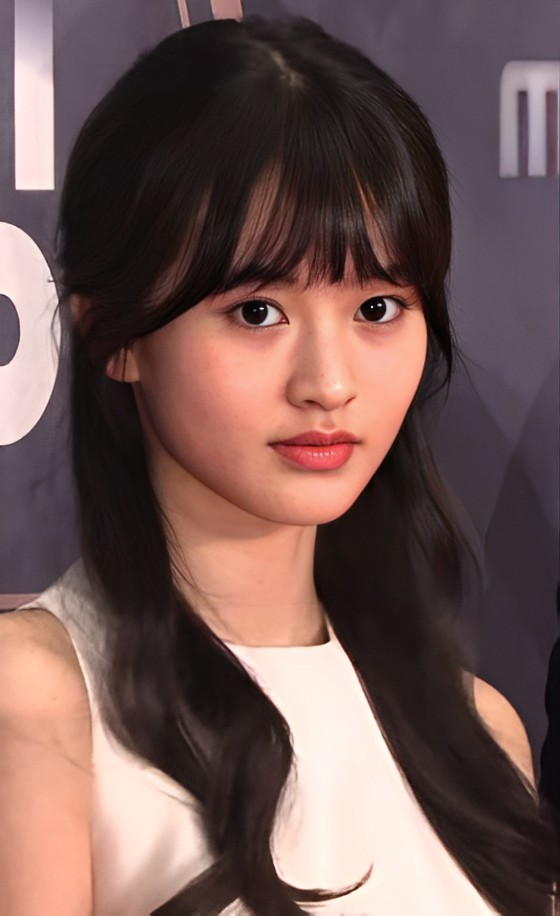
- Ryu in December 2018
- Born: February 13, 2004 (age 22); Changwon, South Korea
- Years active: 2013–present
- Agent: Content Y

Korean name
- Hangul: 류한비
- Hanja: 柳翰庇
- RR: Ryu Hanbi
- MR: Ryu Hanbi

Ryu Han-bi (Korean: 류한비; born February 13, 2004) is a South Korean actress. She is best known for her role as young Han Jae-yi/Gil Nak-won in Come and Hug Me (2018) and Eunice Kang in the Netflix series XO, Kitty (2023).

== Filmography ==
=== Film ===
Year	Title	Role	Notes	Ref.
2019	Cheer Up, Mr. Lee	Min-jeong	Support role	

=== Television series ===
Year	Title	Role	Notes	Ref.
2016	Local Hero	Im Da-bin	Support role	
2016	Entourage	Kim Yoo-bin	Support role	
2017	The Happy Loner	young Na Ji-young	Support role	
2017	Argon	Kim Seo-Woo	Support role	
2017	Suspicious Partner	young Cha Yoo-jung	Support role	
2018	Come and Hug Me	young Han Jae-yi / Gil Nak-won	Support role	
2023	XO, Kitty	Eunice Kang	Support role	

== Award and nominations ==
Name of the award ceremony, year presented, nominee(s) of the award, award category, and the result of the nomination
Award ceremony	Year	Category	Nominee(s)/work(s)	Result	Ref.
MBC Drama Awards	2018	Best Young Actress	Come and Hug Me	Won	
