= Hot Spot (2026 film) =

2026 film by Agnieszka Smoczyńska

- American theatrical release poster
- Directed by: Agnieszka Smoczyńska
- Written by: Robert Bolesto
- Produced by: Klaudia Śmieja-Rostworowska; Bogna Szewczyk-Skupień
- Starring: Andrzej Konopka; Noomi Rapace; Reika Kirishima
- Cinematography: Jakub Kijowski
- Edited by: Beata Liszewska
- Music by: Marcin Mack; Zuzanna Wrońska
- Production company: Madants
- Distributed by: So Films (Poland)
- Release dates: 24 July 2026 (Fantasia); 25 September 2026 (Poland)
- Running time: 101 minutes
- Countries: Poland; Greece; Sweden; Norway
- Language: English
- Box office: $256,350

Hot Spot is a 2026 science fiction thriller film directed by Agnieszka Smoczyńska. It stars Andrzej Konopka, Noomi Rapace, and Reika Kirishima.

== Plot ==
In the future, all humans are controlled by a sentient A.I. known as The Head. All citizens are required to eat a "jelly bean" daily and on time. Any citizen that refuses to comply are eliminated by The Head.

In a refugee camp at a disused airport, a refugee is killed. The Head assigns Detective Jan 623 to the case. Upon arrival at the airport, a woman named Maria is assigned to assist Jan 623 with his investigation. During the investigation, a refugee named Rana comes under Jan's suspicion. Through his interrogation of Rana, Jan learns that an immigration guard is responsible for the murder.

Following this lead, Jan uses The Head to conduct a brain scan of the immigration guard's retinal cortex. Jan eyewitnesses the refugee's murder through his eyes. The Head orders the remaining immigration guards to apprehend him for the murder.

Jan takes a solar-powered autonomous car ride home. After Jan takes a moment to reflect on the case while finishing a micro-cigarette, he heads home to see a special red bird, which he stops to televise to his son Zen. Jan walks into his home to greet Ayka, his wife who has the ability to disconnect people from The Head by singing to them, and Zen. The Head interrupts with the convicted immigration guard's televised apology and begs for absolution, before being executed. Ayka disconnects Zen from The Head to avoid seeing the execution. The boy has difficulties with logging back in.

Jan attends a show where Ayka is performing on stage. During the performance Akya thrusts herself onto the floor among the crowd and Jan momentarily hallucinates Akya is Rana, and he draws his gun and points it at Ayka.

After the performance, they take an autonomous ride to the Dead Forest. After arriving, Jan gets out of the car and walks into the woods where he appears to transform into a tiger and finds a wounded animal, but is scared back to the car by the animal's cry. When he comes back, he discovers Ayka is wounded. He takes her to an examination which reveals Ayka's mastectomy (possibly a result of the incident).

The next day, Ayka is shown alone in the house, breaking the rule that prohibits masturbation. At the same time, Head falls victim to a blackout, an event that hurts, even kills many citizens.

Jan returns to the refugee center to confront Rana and demands to know why she is hacking his brain. She responds it is not her doing it, but Jan himself. Maria malfunctions and is eliminated by The Head. Jan demands the immigration guards arrest Rana for her murder.

The Head advises Jan that Zen is in danger. Jan drives to Zen and finds him on the ledge of a tall building overlooking the city. Jan rescues Zen and they both ride home.

Rana's execution is televised and Jan makes Ayka watch and Ayka admits she caused the incident Rana was blamed for. Ayka confesses to Jan that she is responsible for the blackout. Furious, Jan seemingly devolves into his tiger form and mauls Ayka to death before being fatally shot to death by Zen with Jan's gun. The movie ends with Zen singing the disconnection song to himself.

== Cast ==
- Andrzej Konopka as Jan 623, a detective working for The Head
- Noomi Rapace as Rana, a refugee
- Reika Kirishima as Ayka, Jan's wife
- Filippa Kaye as Maria, Jan's assigned partner
- George Aurimas Cris as Zen, the son of Jan and Ayka
- Niki Sereti as Bossa, Jan's supervisor
- Ektoras Liatsos as TseTse, Jan's coworker
- Rasmi Tsopela as Granny, Zen's grandmother
- Eleni Tzangka as Mona

== Production ==
The film was announced in June 2020. Principal photography took place in Greece, with filming wrapping on 22 November 2024. Jakub Kijowski served as the cinematographer. Marcin Macuk and Zuzanna Wrońska composed the score for the film.

== Release ==
New Europe Film Sales acquired international sales rights to the film. Focus Features and Universal Pictures International will distribute the film internationally, excluding Poland, Greece, and France. In France, it will be distributed by The Jokers. So Films will distribute the film in Poland.

The film premiered at the 30th Fantasia International Film Festival on 24 July 2026, and was theatrically released in North America on 21 August 2026, before releasing in Poland on 25 September.

== Reception ==
On the review aggregator website Rotten Tomatoes, 19% of 16 critics' reviews are positive, with an average rating of 3.8/10. Metacritic, which uses a weighted average, assigned the film a score of 28 out of 100, based on five critics, indicating "generally unfavorable" reviews.
