= Gangnam B-Side =

2024 South Korean television series

- Promotional poster
- Also known as: Bulk
- Hangul: 강남 비-사이드
- RR: Gangnam bi-saideu
- MR: Kangnam pi-saidŭ
- Genre: Crime thriller
- Written by: Joo Won-gyu; Park Noo-ri
- Directed by: Park Noo-ri
- Starring: Jo Woo-jin; Ji Chang-wook; Ha Yoon-kyung; Kim Hyeong-seo
- Music by: Hwang Sang-Jun
- Country of origin: South Korea
- Original language: Korean
- No. of episodes: 8 (list of episodes)

Production
- Running time: 50 minutes
- Production companies: Sanai Pictures; Plus M Entertainment; Story Rooftop

Original release
- Network: Disney+
- Release: November 6 – November 27, 2024

Gangnam B-Side (Korean: 강남 비-사이드) is a 2024 South Korean crime thriller television series written and directed by Park Noo-ri with Joo Won-gyu, and starring Jo Woo-jin, Ji Chang-wook, Ha Yoon-kyung, and Kim Hyeong-seo.

Set in the Seoul regional district of Gangnam frequently at night, a detective, a broker, and a prosecutor team up to chase after a black connection. It was released on Disney+ from November 6 to 27, 2024.

Gangnam B-Side was invited as one of the six drama series in the On Screen section of the 29th Busan International Film Festival.

== Synopsis ==
Kang Dong-woo, who led a police force corruption probe, is thereafter rejected by his peers and estranged from his family. After relocating to a peaceful rural outpost, he finds himself drawn once more into the shady Gangnam district of Seoul when his daughter's friend named Kim Jae-hee goes missing. Along with broker Yoon Gil-ho and prosecutor Min Seo-jin, Dong-woo will reenter the world of vice, narcotics, and corruption in an attempt to unearth a plot that might bring down some of the wealthiest elite in the city.

== Cast and characters ==
=== Main ===
- Jo Woo-jin as Kang Dong-woo

A detective who graduated from an elite police academy but was demoted overnight. He gets deeply involved in unexpected incidents due to his personality of pushing forward without hesitation when he gets fixated on something.

- Ji Chang-wook as Yoon Gil-ho / Kim Min-seok
  - Moon Sung-hyun as young Min-seok

A mysterious broker who has control over Gangnam and lived a life at the bottom in the darkest part of the flashy city in order to survive.

- Ha Yoon-kyung as Min Seo-jin

A prosecutor who graduated from a local national university and has been working her way up the ranks at the prosecutor's office with no connections.

- Kim Hyeong-seo as Kim Jae-hee / Jenny

A runaway club ace.

=== Supporting ===
==== People around Kang Dong-woo ====
- Oh Ye-ju as Kang Ye-seo

Dong-woo's daughter and Jaehee’s best friend.

- Yoo Sun as Shin Ji-hye

Kang Dong-woo's divorced ex-wife. announcer.

- Hyun Bong-sik as Kim Jang-ho

Former detective of the Gangnam West Police Station in Seoul and current president of Jeil Human Resources Total Service, a criminal investigation agency.

- Choi Kwang-il as Moon Chil-sung

Former police chief and current member of the National Assembly, who called Dongwoo back to Gangnam.

- Choi Seong-hyeok as Dried Squid

JHRTS employee and Jangho's subordinate.

- Ryu Hye-young as Seo Ji-soo

Detective from Violent Team 1 in Gangnam Western Police Station

==== People around Yoon Gil-ho ====
- Jeong Jae-kwang as MD Regime

Gilho's friend and Gangnam caller.

- Park Ju-won as Lee Jeong-hwa

Kim Jae-hee's friend and Gangnam call girl, who was killed by Noh Jun-seo.

- Song Ji-woo as Oh Jin-young

Call girl and drug addict.

- Nam Jin-bok as Gil-ho's uncle

Smuggler.

- Ok Ja-yeon as Choi Su-in

Gangnam pimp.

- Gong Jae-Kyung as Madam Baek

Gangnam madam, who was owner of Lucky Arcade

==== Police ====
- Kim Seung-hyun as FM

Detective from Violent Team 1 in Gangnam Western Police Station

- Kim Do-hyun as Ju-yun

Seoul Metropolitan Police Agency Violent Crime Investigation Team Chief Inspector and former chief of the Gangnam West Department, who was Dong-woo's superior. A corrupt police officer who looks after Club Hyena.

- Lim Hyun-sung as Team Leader in Violent Crimes Team 1

Head of Strong Team 1 in Seoul Gangnam West Police Station. A corrupt police officer who follows in Jooyun's footsteps and looks after Club Hyena.

==== Prosecution ====
- Jeong Man-sik as Tak Joo-il

Chief Prosecutor, Seoul Central District Prosecutors' Office. The person responsible for trying to cover up the Lee Jeong-hwa incident and the sponsor of Noh Jun-seo. He later became Senior Secretary for Civil Affairs, but was eventually arrested by Min Seo-jin. He was later released by Mayor Woo Dae-sik, but was eventually killed by President Choi.

- Park So-ri as Ryu Hyun-kyung

Min Seo-jin’s Chief of Investigation at the Seoul Central District Prosecutors' Office.

- Jeong Gi-seop as Chief Prosecutor

Chief of the Inspection Department of the Supreme Prosecutors' Office.

- Kim Tae-han as Chief Ahn

Chief Prosecutor at Seoul Central District Prosecutors' Office.

- Jang Won-hyung as Investigator Jang

Investigator at Min Seo-jin’s Supreme Prosecutors' Office Anti-Corruption Department.

=== Other characters ===
- Jung Jae-kwang as MD Jung Kwon
- Jeong Ga-ram as No Jun-seo

/ Junni.

Celebrity, who CEO of Club Hyena and Gangnam Trade mid-level manager.

- Im Seong-jae as Psyche

Club Hyena MD and Junseo's manager.

- Ji Seung-hyun as Lee Kang-soo

Representative of Kang Soo Entertainment and Noh Jun-seo.

- Hong Si-young as MD Lemon

Club Hyena MD

- Park Sung-joon as Chief Seo

Club Hyena VIP guest.

- An Seong-bong as Head of Security

Colosseum security chief.

- Kim Jong-soo as Choi Hak-gu

CEO of Gangnam Trade INC.

- Cha Rae-hyeong as K
  - Lee Jae-Yong as young K

Head of Gangnam Trade Headquarters and Choi Hak-gu's security.

- Yoo Seong-ju as Presidential Chief of Staff
- Kim Byeong-ok as Woo Dae-sik

Gyonam Market

- Lee Seo-hwan as Lee Han-pyeong :Vice Minister of Health
- Baek Ik-nam as Baek Ji-man

Member of the Future Creation Party.

- Maeng Seong-geun as Park Jeong-hoon

Member of the Future Creation Party.

- Doo-eun Kim as Kyeong-soon Cho

Minister of Food and Drug Safety.

- Heo Ji-Na as Chairman Yoon
- Yoon Byung-hee as President Kwon
- Jo Seong-hee as Kim Jang-ho's Big Sister Call Girl 2
- Lee Won as Club girl
- Lim So-yoon as Chocolate Call Girl
- Yoo Dong-hoon as MD Diony
- Lee Seok-hyung as Choi Boo-gi

YouTube channel Woogie Boogie reporter.

- Yoo Seon as Shin Ji-hye

== Episodes ==
No.	Directed by	Written by	Original release date
1	Park Noo-ri	Joo Won-gyu & Park Noo-ri	November 6, 2024
2	Park Noo-ri	Joo Won-gyu & Park Noo-ri	November 6, 2024
3	Park Noo-ri	Joo Won-gyu & Park Noo-ri	November 13, 2024
4	Park Noo-ri	Joo Won-gyu & Park Noo-ri	November 13, 2024
5	Park Noo-ri	Joo Won-gyu & Park Noo-ri	November 20, 2024
6	Park Noo-ri	Joo Won-gyu & Park Noo-ri	November 20, 2024
7	Park Noo-ri	Joo Won-gyu & Park Noo-ri	November 27, 2024
8	Park Noo-ri	Joo Won-gyu & Park Noo-ri	November 27, 2024

== Production ==
=== Development ===
Developed under the working title Bulk (벌크; Beolkeu), Gangnam B-Side is produced by Sanai Pictures with Plus M Entertainment and Story Rooftop. Park Noo-ri, who directed Money (2019), both directed and penned it with Joo Won-gyu.

In February 2024, Disney+ announced that the series was one of the Korean originals that would be releasing in 2024.

=== Casting ===
In January 2023, Jo Woo-jin and Ha Yoon-kyung were cast and confirmed to appear as lead actors for the series while Cha Eun-woo was still in discussion. Two months later, it was confirmed by both Fantagio and Sanai Pictures officials that Cha decided not to appear. In an interview with Kim Hyeong-seo in October 2023, she revealed that she went to audition for Bulk. Ji Chang-wook was cast in November 2023, and confirmed to appear by his company in February 2024.

=== Filming ===
Principal photography began at the end of November 2023, and lasted for about six months.

== Release ==
Disney+ announced that Gangnam B-Side was scheduled for released in the second half of 2024. It has been confirmed that the series would premiere on November 6, 2024.

The series was invited as one of the six drama series in the On Screen section of the 29th Busan International Film Festival between October 2–11, 2024, where three out of eight episodes had its world premiere.
