= The Lies Within =

2019 South Korean television series

- Promotional poster
- Hangul: 모두의 거짓말
- Lit.: Everyone's Lies
- RR: Moduui geojinmal
- MR: Moduŭi kŏjinmal
- Genre: Thriller
- Based on: Anti-Human Declaration by Joo Won-gyu
- Developed by: Studio Dragon
- Written by: Jeon Young-sin; Won Yoo-jung
- Directed by: Lee Yoon-jung
- Starring: Lee Min-ki; Lee Yoo-young
- Country of origin: South Korea
- Original language: Korean
- No. of episodes: 16

Production
- Running time: 60 minutes
- Production company: Studio Dragon

Original release
- Network: OCN
- Release: October 12 – December 1, 2019

The Lies Within (Korean: 모두의 거짓말) is a 2019 South Korean television series starring Lee Yoo-young and Lee Min-ki. Based on a novel by Joo Won-gyu, it was developed and produced by Studio Dragon for OCN. It aired from October 12 to December 1, 2019.

== Synopsis ==
The story of a woman who joins the National Assembly and teams up with a detective to save her husband after he abruptly disappears following the sudden death of her father.

== Cast ==
=== Main ===
- Lee Min-ki as Jo Tae-sik, a once enthusiastic detective who now lives a completely different life and has requested appointment at a rural police station.
- Lee Yoo-young as Kim Seo-hee, the youngest daughter of an assemblyman who appears sophisticated, but is a disappointment at home due to her family's high standards set by her older sister.

=== Supporting ===
- Lee Joon-hyuk as Jung Sang-hoon, Seo-hee's husband who disappeared mysteriously after her father's death.
- On Joo-wan as Jin Young-min, the general manager of JQ Industries.
- Lee Jun-hyeok as Yoo Dae-yong, head of the metropolitan investigation team.
- Kim Si-eun as Kang Jin-kyung, a former member of the national track team.
- Yun Jong-seok as Jeon Ho-gyu, an intelligent policeman who used to work at a major company.
- Kim Jong-soo
- Yoon Bok-in as Kim Seo-hee's mother
- Seo Hyun-woo as In Dong-gu, a character who is willing to go to any lengths for Chairman Jeong Young-moon.
- Kim Yong-ji as Choi Soo-yun
- Ye Soo-jung as Coroner
- Song Young-chang as Hong Min-guk
- Jo Ryun
- Kim Hak-sun
- Hong In

== Production ==
The first script reading was held in June 2019 in Sangam-dong, Seoul.

== Viewership ==
The Lies Within : South Korea viewers per episode (thousands)

Season	Episode number															
Season	1	2	3	4	5	6	7	8	9	10	11	12	13	14	15	16
1	N/A	530	N/A	302	277	320	N/A	N/A	N/A	329	302	379	258	322	325	437

Source: Audience measurement performed nationwide by Nielsen Korea.

Average TV viewership ratings
Ep.	Original broadcast date	Average audience share (Nielsen Korea)	
Ep.	Original broadcast date	Nationwide	Seoul
1	October 12, 2019	1.375%	N/A
2	October 13, 2019	2.163%	2.547%
3	October 19, 2019	0.919%	N/A
4	October 20, 2019	1.298%	N/A
5	October 26, 2019	1.056%	1.513%
6	October 27, 2019	1.470%	1.274%
7	November 2, 2019	0.917%	N/A
8	November 3, 2019	1.476%	1.760%
9	November 9, 2019	1.030%	1.538%
10	November 10, 2019	1.606%	1.875%
11	November 16, 2019	1.432%	1.981%
12	November 17, 2019	1.610%	2.042%
13	November 23, 2019	1.087%	1.545%
14	November 24, 2019	1.662%	1.795%
15	November 30, 2019	1.610%	2.084%
16	December 1, 2019	2.016%	2.412%
Average		1.420%	— (Note: Due to some unpublished ratings, the exact average rating is unknown.)
In the table above, the blue numbers represent the lowest ratings and the red numbers represent the highest ratings.; N/A denotes that the rating is not known.; This series aired on a cable channel/pay TV which normally has a relatively smaller audience compared to free-to-air TV/public broadcasters (KBS, SBS, MBC and EBS).
