= The Target (film) =

- Theatrical release poster
- Hangul: 표적
- Hanja: 標的
- RR: Pyojeok
- MR: P'yojŏk
- Directed by: Chang
- Written by: Jo Seong-geol; Jeon Cheol-hong
- Produced by: Syd Lim; Seo Woo-sik
- Starring: Ryu Seung-ryong; Lee Jin-wook; Kim Sung-ryung; Cho Yeo-jeong; Jo Eun-ji; Yoo Jun-sang
- Cinematography: Choi Sang-muk
- Edited by: Kim Chang-ju
- Music by: Park In-young
- Production companies: Barunson; Yong Film
- Distributed by: CJ Entertainment
- Release dates: April 30, 2014 (South Korea); May 22, 2014 (Cannes)
- Running time: 98 minutes
- Country: South Korea
- Language: Korean
- Box office: US$19.9 million

The Target (Korean: 표적; RR: Pyojeok) is a 2014 South Korean action thriller film directed by Yoon Hong-seung, starring Ryu Seung-ryong, Lee Jin-wook, Kim Sung-ryung, Cho Yeo-jeong, Jo Eun-ji, and Yoo Jun-sang. It is a remake of the 2010 French film Point Blank.

Released on April 30, 2014 in South Korea, the film was also shown out of competition in the Midnight Screenings section at the 2014 Cannes Film Festival.

== Plot ==
Former mercenary Yeo-hoon has reformed and is leading a normal life. That is, until he winds up framed for the death of a prominent CEO. He escapes, takes a bullet and winds up in a hospital bed. A doctor at the hospital, medical resident Tae-joon, helps him to escape his pursuers. When Tae-joon's pregnant wife is kidnapped, the two men embark on a dangerous 36-hour chase.

== Cast ==
- Ryu Seung-ryong as Baek Yeo-hoon
- Lee Jin-wook as Lee Tae-joon
- Yoo Jun-sang as Song Gi-cheol
- Kim Sung-ryung as Jung Young-joo
- Cho Yeo-jeong as Jung Hee-joo
- Jo Eun-ji as Park Soo-jin
- Jin Goo as Baek Sung-hoon
- Kim Dae-myung as Jang Gyu-ho
- Jang Joon-nyeong as Lee Jeong-soo
- Yeom Ji-yeong as Yoo Hyeon-young
- Lee Hyun-wook as Jo Sang-woo
- Jo Kyeong-hoon as Jang Pil-joo
- Kim Tae-hwan as Killer 1
- Ki Se-hyeong as Killer 2
- Joo Seok-je as Jang Jin-seong
- Kim Jong-gu as Chief of police
- Byun Sang-yoon as Yeong-joo team member
- Yoo Yeong-bok as Yang Dong-seok
- Wi Yang-ho as Arch king
- Jang Eun-seon as Ob/gyn female doctor
- Shin Dam-soo as Drunk
- Kim Young-jae as Prosecutor

== Box office ==
The Target was released on April 30, 2014. It had a solid opening despite placing third at the box office, behind The Fatal Encounter (another Korean film released on the same day) and The Amazing Spider-Man 2. With a market share of 21.5%, it attracted 1.35 million admissions and ₩6.63 billion (US$6.46 million) in its first week.

On its second week, the film rose to second place at the box office, for a total of more than 2 million admissions from 716 screens nationwide.
