= Cheer Up, Mr. Lee =

2019 film by Lee Gae-byok

- Theatrical release poster
- Hangul: 힘을 내요, 미스터 리
- RR: Himeul naeyo, miseuteo Ri
- MR: Himŭl naeyo, misŭt'ŏ Ri
- Directed by: Lee Gae-byok
- Written by: Kim Hee-jin; Jang Yoon-mi; Lee Gae-byok
- Produced by: Syd Lim; Kim Jeong-bok
- Starring: Cha Seung-won; Um Chae-young; Park Hae-joon; Kim Hye-ok; Ahn Gil-kang; Jeon Hye-bin; Ryu Han-bi
- Cinematography: Kim Jeong-won
- Edited by: Yang Jin-mo
- Music by: Bang Jun-seok
- Production companies: Yong Film; Dexter Studios
- Distributed by: Next Entertainment World
- Release date: September 11, 2019
- Running time: 111 minutes
- Country: South Korea
- Language: Korean
- Budget: ₩8.9 billion
- Box office: US$8.7 million

Cheer Up, Mr. Lee (Korean: 힘을 내요, 미스터 리) is a 2019 South Korean comedy-drama film directed by Lee Gae-byok. The film stars Cha Seung-won, Um Chae-young, Park Hae-joon, Kim Hye-ok, Ahn Gil-kang, Jeon Hye-bin and Ryu Han-bi.

== Plot ==
Cheol-su (Cha Seung-won) is physically fit and handsome, but has intellectual disabilities. He finds out that he has a daughter, Saet-byeol (Um Chae-young), that he never knew existed.

== Cast ==
- Cha Seung-won as Chul-su
- Um Chae-young as Saet-byeol
- Park Hae-joon as Yeong-su
- Kim Hye-ok as Saet-byul's grandmother
- Ahn Gil-kang as Mr. Kim
- Jeon Hye-bin as Eun-hui
- Ryu Han-bi as Min-jeong
- Jo Han-chul as Deok-gu
- Sung Ji-ru as Jeong-gwon
- Ji Yi-soo as Ji-an
- Shin Hyun-bin as Hye-yeong
- Yoo Yeon as Hair Salon owner
- Kim Bup-rae as boss Yang

== Production ==
Principal photography began on June 23, 2018, and wrapped on September 22, 2018.
