= Reika Kirishima =

Japanese actress (born 1972)

- Born: 霧島れいか (Kirishima, Reika); 5 August 1972 (age 54); Niigata Prefecture, Japan
- Occupation: Actress
- Years active: 1997–present

Reika Kirishima (霧島れいか, Kirishima Reika; born 5 August 1972) is a Japanese film and television actress active since 1997. Her first feature movie was Godzilla: Final Wars and first television show was Strawberry Night.

== Filmography ==
=== Film ===
Year	Film	Role	Notes	Ref
2005	A Stranger of Mine	Maki Kuwata		
2010	Norwegian Wood	Reiko Ishida		
2012	Bread of Happiness	Suehisa's mother		
2021	Drive My Car	Oto Kafuku		
2024	The Young Strangers	Asami Kazama		
2025	Vanishing World	Shizuku		
2026	Hot Spot	Ayka	Polish film	
2026	Tokyo Burst: Crime City		Japanese–Korean film	
2026	Arrested Memory		Japanese-Taiwanese film	
2026	Monster in Sheep's Clothing	Tatsumi's mother		

=== Television ===
Year	Title	Character	Ref
2017	Business Card Game (名刺ゲーム, Meishi Gemu)	Yumi Kanda	
2017	Cruel Audiences (残酷な観客達, Zankokuna Kankyakutachi)	Miwa	
2018	Switched	Ukon	
2018	Giver		
2022	Prism		
