= Ayaka Miyoshi =

Japanese actress and model (born 1996)

- 三吉 彩花
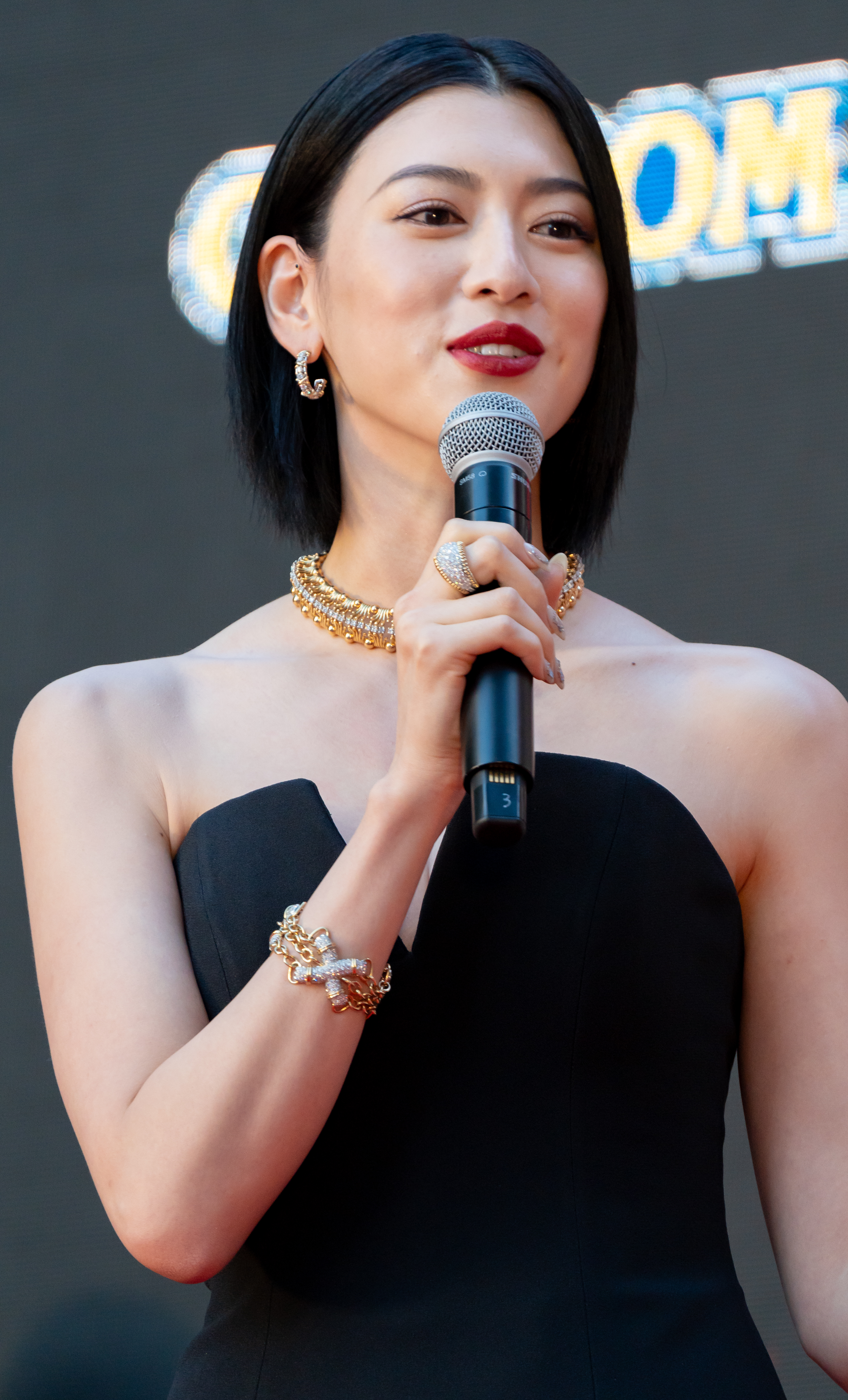
- Miyoshi at the 2023 Tokyo International Film Festival
- Born: June 18, 1996 (age 30); Kawagoe, Saitama, Japan
- Occupations: Actress; model
- Years active: 2007–present
- Height: 1.73 m (5 ft 8 in)
- Musical career
- Genre: J-pop
- Instrument: Vocals
- Years active: 2010–2012
- Formerly of: Sakura Gakuin

Ayaka Miyoshi (三吉 彩花, Miyoshi Ayaka; born June 18, 1996) is a Japanese actress and model best known for starring in Dance With Me (2019) and as Rizuna Ann in Alice in Borderland (2020). She is represented by the talent agency Amuse Inc. and was a member of the agency's girl group Sakura Gakuin from 2010 to 2012.

== Career ==
In October 2007, Miyoshi made her first appearance in a TV drama with Otoko no Kosodate.

She began her modeling career in the first grade of elementary school. After passing the audition for Nico-petit, she appeared in the fashion magazine from July 2008 to June 2010.

In April 2010, Miyoshi joined the Japanese idol group Sakura Gakuin.

In August 2010, after participating in the Miss Seventeen 2010 audition for new models, Miyoshi became an exclusive model for the teen fashion magazine Seventeen.

She left Sakura Gakuin with a graduation ceremony on March 25, 2012.

In 2022, Miyoshi became Tiffany & Co.'s first brand ambassador for Japan.

Miyoshi was cast as Ann Rizuna in the Netflix series Alice in Borderland. She played the lead role of Ran Tachibana in the 2023 film Knuckle Girl.

In June 2024, Miyoshi was named as the official ambassador for the TikTok TOHO Film Festival 2024.

On October 6, 2024, she was awarded Rising Star of the Year at the 2024 Asia Contents Awards & Global OTT Awards.

== Personal life ==
Miyoshi was born on June 18, 1996 in the city of Kawagoe, Saitama. She is an only child. She can speak Korean fluently.

In 2019, there were media speculations about Miyoshi and Ryoma Takeuchi's romantic relationship, but their agencies at that time did not disclose any information about the two, and they themselves did not comment on the reports till later in May 2020, when it was revealed by media outlets that they were already living together and were "counting down the days until marriage." On October 27, 2024, the couple reportedly split after four years to focus more on their careers.

== Filmography ==
=== Film ===
| Year | Title | Role | Notes | Ref(s) |
|---|---|---|---|---|
| 2008 | Sing, Salmon, Sing! | Young Kasumi Ogino | | |
| 2008 | Shinizokonai no Ao | Eri | | |
| 2009 | Solo Contest | Fūka Usui | | |
| 2010 | Your Story | Young Kimiko | | |
| 2010 | Confessions | Ayaka Tsuchida | | |
| 2012 | G'mor Evian! | Hatsuki Hirose | | |
| 2013 | Leaving on the 15th Spring | Yuna Nakazato | Lead role | |
| 2016 | One Piece Film: Gold | Bit (voice) | | |
| 2018 | Inuyashiki | Mari Inuyashiki | | |
| 2019 | Dance with Me | Shizuka Suzuki | Lead role | |
| 2020 | Daughters | Koharu Tsutsumi | Lead role | |
| 2020 | Howling Village | Kanade Morita | Lead role | |
| 2020 | The Devil Wears Jūnihitoe | Lady Kokiden | | |
| 2023 | Knuckle Girl | Ran Tachibana | Lead role; South Korean-Japanese film | |
| 2024 | Sensei's Pious Lie | Minako Fuchino | | |
| 2024 | The Real You | Ayaka Miyoshi | | |
| 2026 | Kingdom 5: The Clash of Souls | Wa Lin | | |
| 2026 | Tazza: The Song of Beelzebub | Kaneko | South Korean film | |

=== Television dramas ===
| Year | Title | Role | Notes | Ref(s) |
|---|---|---|---|---|
| 2007 | Otoko no Kosodate | Senri Harada | | |
| 2008 | Yume no Mitsuke Kata Oshietaru! | Maya Sawada | | |
| 2008 | Pocky 4 Sisters! | Sari Miyashita | | |
| 2009 | Yūkai Kidnapping | Yuri Sayama | | |
| 2010 | Atami no Sōsakan | Mai Shinonome | | |
| 2011 | Taisetsu na Koto wa Subete Kimi ga Oshiete Kureta | Mio Yoshimura | | |
| 2011 | Kokosei Restaurant | Minami Kawase | | |
| 2012 | Perfect Son | Sayaka Tamba | | |
| 2012 | Higashino Keigo Mysteries | Miyoko Kasai | | |
| 2012 | Kekkon Shinai | Mai Sakura | | |
| 2014 | Kindaichi Shōnen no Jikenbo Gokumon Juku Satsujin Jiken | Kiyoko Shikibu | | |
| 2014 | Lost Days | Satsuki Tachibana | | |
| 2014 | GTO: Great Teacher Onizuka | Meiri Miyaji | | |
| 2015 | Angel Heart | Xiang-Ying | Lead role | |
| 2017–18 | Bakumatsu Gourmet Bushi Meshi! | Banshiro's wife | | |
| 2020–2025 | Alice in Borderland | Rizuna Ann | 3 seasons | |

=== Variety ===
- Dōbutsu Bōken Variety: Wanda! (～どうぶつ冒険バラエティ～ワンダ!) (14 October 2011 – 7 September 2012, TV Tokyo)
- Merengue no Kimochi (メレンゲの気持ち) (11 October 2014 – 14 October 2017, NTV) — Host

=== Commercials ===
Appeared in over 20 television commercials.

=== Music videos ===
- Kagrra, — "Shizuku" (雫〜shizuku〜) (14 February 2007)
- Departures — by the band Globe. The video was released on May 3, 2016, 20 years after the band released the song.
- Won't Cry - by Jay Chou and Mayday vocalist, Ashin (16 September 2019)
- Masterpiece- by LNGSHOT (21 October 2026)

== Awards ==
- 67th Mainichi Film Award (awarded in 2013 for 2012) — Sponichi Grand Prix Newcomer Award (for Gumo Ebian!)
- 35th Yokohama Film Festival (awarded in 2014) — Best Newcomer Award (for Tabidachi no Uta: Jugo no Haru and Gumo Ebian!)
- 2024 Asia Contents Awards & Global OTT Awards — Rising Star of the Year (for Globe-Trotter Travel Guidebook)
- 46th Yokohama Film Festival (awarded in 2025) — Best Supporting Actress (for The Real You)
