= Dance with Me (2019 Japanese film) =

- Theatrical release poster

Japanese name
- Kanji: ダンスウィズミー
Transcriptions
- Revised Hepburn: Dansu Wizu Mī
- Directed by: Shinobu Yaguchi
- Written by: Shinobu Yaguchi
- Produced by: Kazuaki Arima; Ichirō Asatsuma; Kōji Bandō; Masahiro Iida; Hiroyuki Ikeda
- Starring: Ayaka Miyoshi; Yuu Yashiro; Chay; Takahiro Miura; Tsuyoshi Muro
- Cinematography: Kazuhiro Taniguchi
- Edited by: Ryūji Miyajima
- Music by: Takuji Nomura; Gentle Forest Jazz Band
- Production companies: Aeon Entertainment; Altamira Pictures; Dentsu; Fujipacific Music; KDDI; Tokyo Theatres Company; Nihon Eiga Broadcasting Corporation; The Asahi Shimbun; SHOWROOM; Hikari TV; Pony Canyon
- Distributed by: Warner Bros. Pictures
- Release date: August 16, 2019 (Japan)
- Running time: 103 minutes
- Country: Japan
- Language: Japanese

Dance with Me (Japanese: ダンスウィズミー, Hepburn: Dansu Wizu Mī), also known as Can't Stop the Dancing, is a Japanese musical film directed by Shinobu Yaguchi and starring Ayaka Miyoshi. It was released on August 16, 2019.

== Plot ==
After she is hypnotized, Shizuka Suzuki sings and dances every time she hears music. She tries to find her hypnotist to break the spell.

== Cast ==
- Ayaka Miyoshi as Shizuka Suzuki
- Yuu Yashiro as Chie Saito
- Chay as Yoko Yamamoto
- Takahiro Miura as Ryosuke Murakami
- Tsuyoshi Muro as Yoshio Watanabe
- Akira Takarada as Machin Ueda
- Haruki Takagi as Debt collector

== Production ==
Principal photography began in July 2018 and filming wrapped up in September 2018.
