= Lee Gae-byok =

South Korean filmmaker (born 1971)

Lee Gye-byok
- Born: September 4, 1971 (age 54); South Korea
- Occupations: Film director screenwriter

Korean name
- Hangul: 이계벽
- RR: I Gyebyeok
- MR: I Kyebyŏk

Lee Gye-byok (Korean: 이계벽; born September 4, 1971) is a South Korean film director and screenwriter. Lee debuted with the romantic-comedy The Beast and the Beauty (2005). After a 10-year break, he returned with the 2016 action-comedy film Luck Key, a box office hit with more than 6.9 million admissions.

== Career ==
Lee was a film major at college when he debuted and won the Silver Prize at the Golden Crown Film Festival with the short I am the Movie. Later, he worked as an assistant director in Sympathy for Mr. Vengeance (2002) and Oldboy (2003), directed by Park Chan-wook.

Showcasing his interest in movies with humor and wit, his feature debut was a romantic-comedy The Beast and the Beauty (2005). After a 10-year break, he returned with the action-comedy film Luck Key (2016), which is a remake of the 2012 Japanese comedy Key of Life.

In 2018, Lee confirmed to direct a comedy film Cheer Up, Mr. Lee which began filming in June. The film is about unexpected situations that happen during a trip of Chul Soo (Cha Seung-won) and his daughter Saet Byul.

== Filmography ==
- Sympathy for Mr. Vengeance (2002) - assistant director
- Boss X File (2002) - 1st assistant director
- Oldboy (2003) - 1st assistant director, script editor
- The Beast and the Beauty (2005) - director
- Nobody Knows (short film, 2006) - director
- 09:05 (short film, 2006) - director
- Couples (2011) - screenwriter, 1st assistant director
- South Bound (2013) - screenwriter
- Luck Key (2016) - director
- Cheer Up, Mr. Lee (2019) - director
