= Kenji Uchida (film director) =

Japanese film director (born 1972)

- Born: 1972 (age 53–54); Kanagawa Prefecture, Japan
- Occupation: Film director

Kenji Uchida (内田けんじ, Uchida Kenji; born 1972 in Kanagawa Prefecture) is a Japanese film director.

He studied filmmaking at San Francisco State University. His independently produced film Weekend Blues won two awards at the 24th Pia Film Festival in 2001. His theatrical feature film debut, A Stranger of Mine (2005), won four awards at the Cannes Film Festival, and also earned him the Best Director award at the 30th Hochi Film Award.

== Filmography ==
- Weekend Blues (2001)
- A Stranger of Mine (2005)
- After School (2008)
- Key of Life (2012)
- The Disappearance of Conan Edogawa: The Worst Day in History (2014)
