= Point Blank (2010 film) =

- French poster
- Directed by: Fred Cavayé
- Written by: Fred Cavayé; Guillaume Lemans
- Produced by: Cyril Colbeau-Justin; Jean-Baptiste Dupont
- Starring: Gilles Lellouche; Roschdy Zem; Gérard Lanvin; Elena Anaya
- Cinematography: Alain Duplantier
- Edited by: Benjamin Weill
- Music by: Klaus Badelt
- Production company: Gaumont
- Distributed by: Gaumont (France); Magnolia Pictures (United States)
- Release date: 1 December 2010
- Running time: 84 minutes
- Country: France
- Language: French
- Budget: $10.3 million
- Box office: $9.2 million

Point Blank (French: À bout portant) is a 2010 French action-thriller film directed by Fred Cavayé and starring Gilles Lellouche, Roschdy Zem, Gérard Lanvin, and Elena Anaya. The film was released on 1 December 2010.

== Plot ==
Samuel Pierret, a nurse's aide, accompanies his pregnant wife Nadia to her sonogram appointment where she is told to stay in bed to avoid complications. Meanwhile, Hugo Sartet, a safecracker and hired thief, is running from two hitmen. When he is hit by a motorcycle, the hitmen flee and he is rushed to Samuel's hospital. Samuel sees a man leave Hugo's bedside and arrives just in time to reinsert Sartet's unplugged respirator.

This attack prompts the police to provide security under Captain Catherine Fabre. While discussing the assassination attempt, another captain, Patrick Werner, arranges to have jurisdiction transferred to him, saying that Sartet is linked to his Meyer case. When Samuel returns home, he and Nadia are attacked and she is abducted. Samuel gets a call saying he must help Sartet escape if he wants to see his wife again. At the hospital, the police guard refuses to let Sartet leave but Samuel subdues him with a defibrillator. Samuel then wakes Sartet with adrenaline and forces him to leave, using the policeman's gun.

When Nadia's captors call again, they are revealed to be Sartet's brother, Luc and a man named Marconi. The brothers arrange the hostage trade at a railway station but when Samuel and Sartet arrive, Sartet notices the two hitmen. Knowing they are dirty cops, Sartet persuades Samuel to flee to his apartment. While Sartet is showering, Samuel decides he does not trust them to return his wife and calls Fabre. However, police led by Captain Werner arrives first. When Fabre arrives, Werner shoots her, revealing himself to be crooked. Werner tells his men to kill the others and leaves but Samuel and Sartet overcomes them and Sartet coerces information from a cop named Vogel. Vogel says Werner enlisted Sartet, with Marconi's help, to crack wealthy Meyer's safe to cover up Meyer's murder, intending to kill Sartet after the job.

Vogel says Werner kept a CCTV video of the involvement of Meyer's son to use as blackmail on a USB drive in his office. He also says that Marconi betrayed Sartet. When further police arrive, Samuel and Sartet flee since they have been framed as cop killers. They head for the warehouse where Nadia was but discover that Sartet's brother is dead and Nadia has been abducted until the dirty cops eliminate all witnesses. Sartet finds Marconi and kills him. He and Samuel come up with a plan to break into the police station. Coordinated by Sartet's underground contacts, a series of robberies breaks out, forcing the station into chaos. Samuel and Sartet arrive at the station where Nadia is held by a dirty cop named Moreau. Using the chaos to disguise themselves as police, Sartet goes to Werner's office and Samuel searches for Nadia. Elsewhere, Werner discovers Marconi's body and tells Moreau to push Nadia out of the window, to mimic suicide. Samuel arrives to find Nadia struggling: they overpower Moreau and escape.

Sartet attempts to break into Werner's safe but runs out of time before Werner arrives and opens it to ensure the USB drive is safe. Sartet obtains the drive at gunpoint. Werner taunts Sartet about how his brother died. Nadia begins to haemorrhage, as the doctor warned. As Samuel tries to stop the bleeding, he is recognized as wanted and arrested. Sartet, blending into the crowd, slips a phone into Samuel's pocket with the USB drive attached. At a safe distance, Sartet calls the phone, prompting Officer Susini to seize the drive as evidence against Samuel. Susini and other cops are already watching the video when Werner arrives, too late. In custody, Samuel is allowed to visit his wife, who has given birth.

Eight years later, the Pierret family is celebrating Christmas and Samuel hears news about Werner, halfway through his 16 year prison sentence. The report mentions that Werner was released for one day, only to be found hanged. Samuel concludes that Sartet was responsible.

== Cast ==
- Gilles Lellouche as Samuel Pierret
- Roschdy Zem as Hugo Sartet
- Gérard Lanvin as Captain Patrick Werner
- Elena Anaya as Nadia Pierret
- Mireille Perrier as Captain Catherine Fabre
- Claire Perot as Officer Anaïs Susini
- Moussa Maaskri as Officer Vogel
- Pierre Benoist as Officer Mercier
- Valérie Dashwood as Officer Moreau
- Virgile Bramly as Officer Mansart
- Nicky Naude as Officer Richert
- Adel Bencherif as Luc Sartet
- Brice Fournier as Marconi
- Jacques Colliard as Francis Meyer

== Remakes ==
A 2014 South Korean remake titled The Target starred Ryu Seung-ryong and Lee Jin-wook in the leading roles, and was directed by Chang (Yoon Hong-seung). and produced by Barunson and Yong Film.

In 2019 the film remake in Bangladeshi Bengali as Password featuring Superstar Shakib Khan and was directed by Malek Afsari, produced by Khan himself under his SK Films.

In 2018, Frank Grillo, Anthony Mackie, and Marcia Gay Harden filmed the American remake titled Point Blank. It is set in Cincinnati, directed by Joe Lynch and produced by Netflix.

In 2019, an Indian Tamil-language remake titled Kadaram Kondan was released and was directed by Rajesh M. Selva and produced by Raaj Kamal Films International.
