= Park Bo-ram (director) =

South Korean director

- 박보람
- Born: Park Bo-ram; Namhae
- Education: Department of Economics of Seoul National University
- Occupation: Television Director
- Years active: 2013 to present
- Employer: SBS (2013–2023)

Korean name
- Hangul: 박보람
- Hanja: 朴寶藍
- RR: Bak Boram
- MR: Pak Poram

Park Bo-ram (Korean: 박보람) is a South Korean television director best known for the crime drama series Through the Darkness. In 2022, the show won the Best Drama Series award at the 27th Asian Television Awards. The following year, it was named a finalist in the Crime Drama category at the New York Festivals TV & Film Awards.

== Early life ==
Park is a native of Daegok Village, Changseon-myeon, Namhae. She graduated from Changseon Middle School and High School and then majored in economics at Seoul National University. While studying, Park continued to pursue her interest in dramas and films through her participation in club activities. Park earnestly decided on her career path and dreamed of joining a broadcasting station. In 2013, Park applied to the SBS public recruitment test.

== Career ==
=== Career beginning ===
After passing SBS's public recruitment in 2013, Park began her career as a member of the network's drama production crew. She first served as an assistant director for the 2014 drama special Wonderful Day in October.

In 2019, she worked as an assistant director for Team B on The Fiery Priest, which is part of screenwriter Park Jae-beom's "justice trilogy." She followed this by working on the first season of the drama series The Penthouse: War in Life in 2021.

=== Directorial debut and acclaim ===
The crime drama series Through the Darkness marked Park's directorial debut. Adapted by Seol Yi-na from the 2018 non-fiction book of the same title, the series highlights the field experiences of co-authors Kwon Il-yong, South Korea's first criminal profiler, and journalist-turned-author Ko Na-mu. It focuses on the psychological profiling of serial killers and is based on a series of random murders that occurred in South Korea during the late 1990s.

In 2022, Through the Darkness won the Best Drama Series award at the 27th Asian Television Awards. The following year, it was selected as a finalist in the Crime Drama category at the New York Festivals TV & Film Awards. The critical and commercial success of the series established Park's reputation as a director.

=== Subsequent Projects ===
"I think it is a pleasant change and an opportunity. In the end, it has been proven that good content can give joy and positive energy to mankind beyond culture, borders, and language. I think this kind of 'success' is driven by the desire for good content and sincerity. While the world is going through a time of pain due to COVID-19, I see it as a great achievement for the Korean drama industry just to be producing quality content while following the quarantine rules"

— Park Bo-ram about OTT Drama

On December 7, 2022, at the Yong Film Night event, it was announced that Park would co-direct an OTT streaming series tentatively titled Mangnaein alongside director Kim Jee-woon. The project is an adaptation of the crime novel Second Sister by Hong Kong author Chan Ho-kei, with Yong Film producing in collaboration with Anthology Studio and SK Global.

In January 2024, SBS announced plans to release the second season of The Fiery Priest. Park, who previously served as an assistant director for the first season, was appointed to direct the sequel. This project marked her second collaboration with screenwriter Park Jae-beom and her third with actor Kim Nam-gil. Produced by Studio S, Big Ocean ENM, Red Nine Pictures, and Gilstory ENT, The Fiery Priest 2 premiered on November 8, 2024.

== Filmography ==
Key
†	Denotes television productions that have not yet been released

Television series credits
Year	Title		Credited as		Ref.
Year	English	Korean	Assistant Director	Director	Ref.
2014	Wonderful Day in October	시월의 어느 멋진 날에	Yes	—N/a	
2019	The Fiery Priest	열혈사제	Yes	—N/a	
2021	The Penthouse: War in Life	펜트하우스	Yes	—N/a	
2022	Through the Darkness	악의 마음을 읽는 자들	—N/a	Yes	
2024	The Fiery Priest Season 2	열혈사제	—N/a	Yes	
2026	Unfriend †	언프렌디	Co-director (Note: with Kim Jee-woon)	—N/a	

== Awards and nominations ==
Name of the award ceremony, year presented, category, nominee of the award, and the result of the nomination
Award ceremony	Year	Category	Nominee	Result	Ref.
Asian Television Awards	2022	Best Picture Award	Through the Darkness	Won	
Asian Television Awards	2022	Best Drama Series	Through the Darkness	Nominated	
Blue Dragon Series Awards	2022	Best Drama	Through the Darkness	Nominated	
New York Festivals: TV & Film Awards	2023	Entertainment Program – Crime Drama	Through the Darkness	Finalist	
