= Chang (director) =

South Korean filmmaker (born 1975)

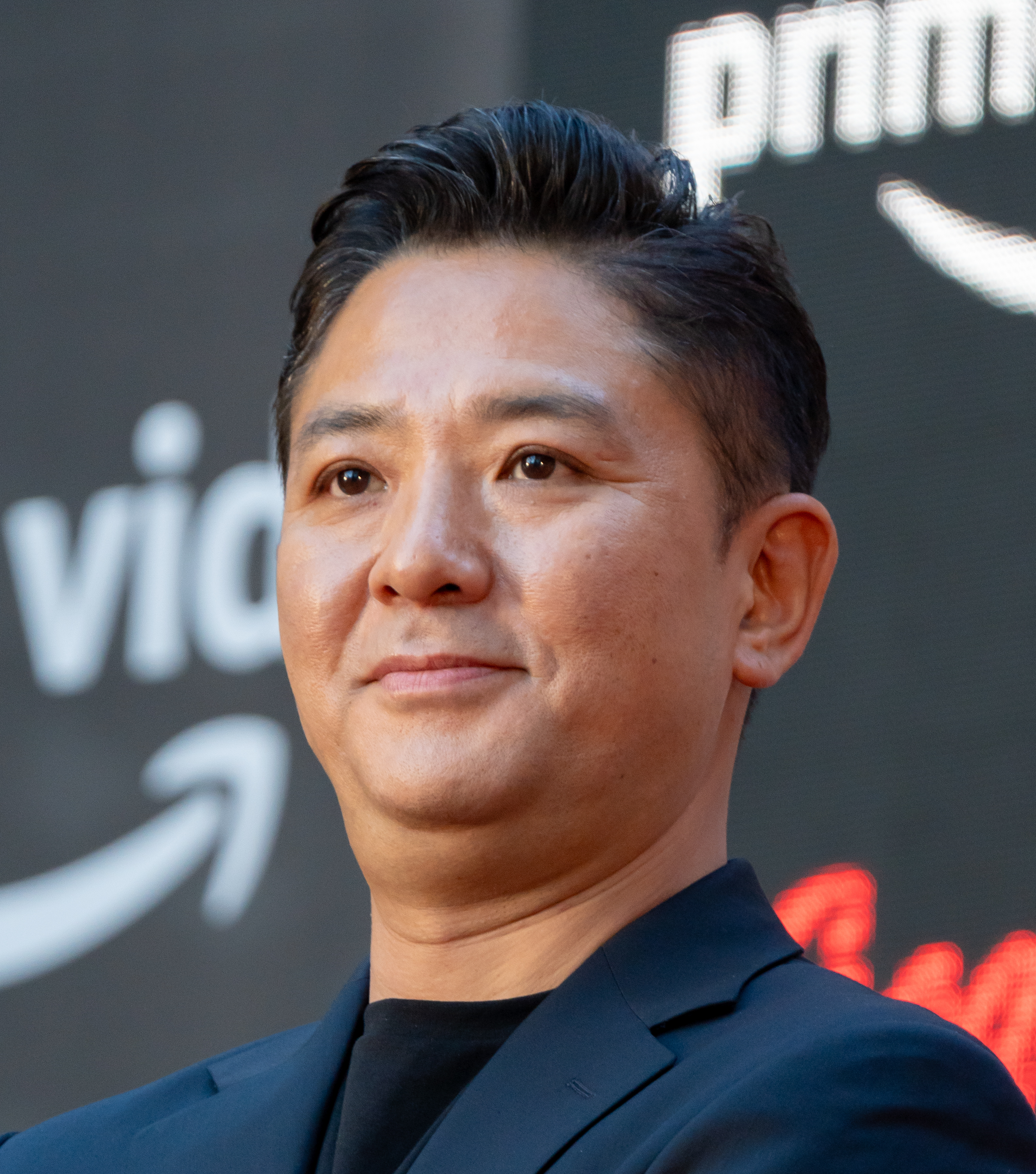
- Chang in 2023
- Born: Yoon Hong-seung; 1975 (age 50–51); South Korea
- Occupations: Film director, screenwriter

Korean name
- Hangul: 윤홍승
- RR: Yun Hongseung
- MR: Yun Hongsŭng

Yoon Hong-seung (Korean: 윤홍승; born 1975), who also goes by the pseudonym Chang, is a South Korean film director and screenwriter. A former music video director, Chang debuted with the Korean horror film Death Bell in 2008. His second feature The Target (2014) - a remake of the 2010 French film Point Blank, won the Golden Goblet Award at the Shanghai International Film Festival, and was also invited to the Cannes Film Festival and Busan International Film Festival in 2014.

== Filmography ==
- Death Bell (2008) - director, screenwriter
- Sydney in Love (short film, 2009) - director
- Lucid Dreaming (short film, 2012) - director
- 48M (2013) - staff
- The Target (2014) - director
- Canola (2016) - director
- Reset (2017) - director
- Knuckle Girl (2023) - director
