= A Stranger of Mine =

- Film poster
- Directed by: Kenji Uchida
- Written by: Kenji Uchida
- Produced by: Mayumi Amano; Masaya Nakamura
- Starring: Yasuhi Nakamura; Reika Kirishima; Sō Yamanaka; Yuka Itaya
- Cinematography: Keiichiro Inoue
- Edited by: Shinichi Fushima
- Music by: Mitsuharu Ishibashi
- Release dates: May 14, 2005 (Cannes Film Festival); July 16, 2005 (Japan)
- Running time: 98 minutes
- Country: Japan
- Language: Japanese

A Stranger of Mine (Japanese: 運命じゃない人, Hepburn: Unmei janai hito) is a 2005 Japanese film by Kenji Uchida, starring Yasuhi Nakamura, Reika Kirishima, Sō Yamanaka and Yuka Itaya.

== Plot ==
In one long Friday evening, Takeshi Miyata (Yasuhi Nakamura), a straight-arrow businessman, will encounter a number of people (some only fleetingly) who have intertwining fates. The plot of the film is presented in succession first from the point of view of Maki Kuwata (Reika Kirishima), a young woman disappointed in love, then from Takeshi's point of view, then of his friend, Yusuke Kanda (Sō Yamanaka), a private detective, then of Takeshi's former girlfriend, Ayumi Kurata (Yuka Itaya), then of a wannabe-tough yakuza, Asai (Kisuke Yamashita).

== Cast ==
Yusuke Kanda (Sō Yamanaka), Maki Kuwata (Reika Kirishima) and Takeshi Miyata (Yasuhi Nakamura) (l-r)

- Yasuhi Nakamura as Takeshi Miyata
- Reika Kirishima as Maki Kuwata
- Sō Yamanaka as Yusuke Kanda
- Yuka Itaya as Ayumi Kurata
- Kisuke Yamashita as Asai
