= Jeong Yong-ki =

South Korean film director and screenwriter

- Hangul: 정용기
- RR: Jeong Yonggi
- MR: Chŏng Yonggi

Jeong Yong-ki (Korean: 정용기; born 1970) is a South Korean film director and scriptwriter.

== Filmography ==
As director:

- Marrying the Mafia 5: Return of the Family (2012)
- Couples (2011)
- The Righteous Thief (2009)
- Once Upon a Time (2008)
- Marrying the Mafia III (2006)
- Marrying the Mafia II (2005)
- The Doll Master (2004)
