= Luck Key =

- Theatrical poster
- Hangul: 럭키
- RR: Reokki
- MR: Rŏkk'i
- Directed by: Lee Gae-byok
- Written by: Jang Yoon-mi
- Based on: Key of Life by Kenji Uchida
- Produced by: Jung Hee-soon
- Starring: Yoo Hae-jin; Lee Joon; Jo Yoon-hee; Lim Ji-yeon
- Cinematography: Kim Tae-kyeong
- Edited by: Yang Jin-mo
- Music by: Bang Jun-seok
- Production company: Yong Film
- Distributed by: Showbox
- Release date: October 13, 2016 (South Korea)
- Running time: 112 minutes
- Country: South Korea
- Language: Korean
- Box office: US$47.4 million

Luck Key (Korean: 럭키; RR: Reokki) is a 2016 South Korean action comedy film directed by Lee Gae-byok, starring Yoo Hae-jin in the lead role. It is a remake of the 2012 Japanese comedy film Key of Life.

== Plot ==
Jae-sung, an aspiring actor who has hit rock bottom, prepares to commit suicide. After his landlady insults him, he first cleans himself at a public sauna. Hyung-wook, a notorious assassin, cleans himself at the same sauna after killing a target. Hyung-wook slips on a soap Jae-sung accidentally drops and passes out. Remembering Hyung-wook's luxurious look, Jae-sung switches his locker key with Hyung-wook's and steals his car and money. Feeling guilty, Jae-sung later tries to return everything to Hyung-wook, who is recuperating in the emergency room. At the hospital, Jae-sung is startled, when Hyung-wook grabs him before Jae-sung is about to leave the belongings. Jae-sung finds that Hyung-wook does not remember anything due to a concussion, leaves without telling Hyung-wook anything.

While Jae-sung enjoys Hyung-wook's money and fancy apartment, Hyung-wook struggles to remember his identity, assuming he is Jae-sung because of the locker key. Hyung-wook can not pay his hospital bill, so Lina, a paramedic, pays it for him after he promises to pay her back. When Hyung-wook realizes he is bankrupt, Lina finds him a job at her mom's small restaurant. With his amazing knife skills, Hyung-wook becomes the main chef, drawing many customers for the restaurant. He later finds a marked date on a calendar with a location and learns that he (Jae-sung in reality) is an actor who is supposed to appear in a gangster-themed TV show as an extra.

Though he initially struggles as an actor, Hyung-wook excels in action scenes thanks to his real life skills. His role in the show becomes more significant with Lina's help as the show progresses. Hyung-wook and Lina also find themselves liking each other. Meantime in Hyung-wook's apartment, Jae-sung discovers a secret room and thinks that Hyung-wook is an undercover cop protecting a witness named Eun-joo, who lives in the same building. Jae-sung watches over her and, over time, falls in love with her.

One day, Jae-sung answers a phone call to Hyung-wook and meets with businessmen who ask him why Eun-joo is still alive. Jae-sung realizes that Hyung-wook is actually an assassin hired to kill Eun-joo. After a picnic with Lina's family, Hyung-wook recovers his memory and finds Jae-sung and Eun-joo in his own apartment. Hyung-wook reveals to Jae-sung that he is not a real assassin and that he has been trying to give a new life to assassination victims by faking their death and sharing the money he makes. Hyung-wook, Jae-sung, and Eun-joo devise a new plan for themselves so that they can start a new clean life.

Hyung-wook tells Lina that they cannot be together and leaves. Heartbroken, Lina follows him to a place where Hyung-wook, Jae-sung, and Eun-joo are trying to fake their own deaths in front of the people who hired Hyung-wook. Lina's unexpected interference almost ruins the plan. The businessmen believe that they are all dead and leave. Later, Hyung-wook tells Lina who he really is and apologizes. Lina, not sure what to do, takes him to the set of the TV show to finish the final scene. On the set, Hyung-wook improvises new lines and confesses his feelings to Lina, who accepts him. Jae-sung and Hyung-wook later star together in a new TV show.

== Cast ==
=== Main ===
- Yoo Hae-jin as Choi Hyung-wook

A ruthless contract killer who goes through a memory loss and lives a life of an ordinary man trying to regain his memory while working part time jobs as a kitchen hand and action movie actor.

- Lee Joon as Yoon Jae-sung

A 32 year-old unknown actor who suffers from poverty, until he deliberately switch identities with Choi Hyung-wook and begins to live a lavish lifestyle.

- Jo Yoon-hee as Kang Ri-na, Lina

A paramedic who settles the hospital bills of Choi Hyung-wook and find him a part time job at her family restaurant. She takes care of Choi during his difficult time trying to regain his memory and supports his acting career.

- Lim Ji-yeon as Song Eun-joo

An important witness who is asked to be killed. She lives in the same apartment complex as Yoon Jae-sung. After learning the truth Yoon tries to protect Song and builds romantic feelings.

=== Supporting ===
- Go Jun as Kwon Hee-rak
- Jo Han-chul as Il-sung
- Kim Min-sang as Movie Director
- Cha Yeop as Assistant Director
- Kim Ji-an as Kang Yoo-na
- Sung Byung-sook as Kang Ri-na's mother
- Park Seung-tae as Kang Ri-na's grandmother

== Release and reception ==
The distribution rights of this movie were sold to nine countries including: China, Taiwan, Vietnam, the Philippines, the U.S.A and Great Britain prior to its local release on October 13, 2016.

Luck Key had a great start and sold 1 million tickets in just three days of its opening.

During the five days since the opening the movie attracted 2.02 million audience, earning an income of US$14.7 million

After four weekends since the movie was released Luck Key earned a total of US$45.3 million.

At the end of its run the film grossed US$47.4 million in total.

== Awards and nominations ==
Year	Award	Category	Nominated work	Result
2017	53rd Baeksang Arts Awards	Best Actor (Film)	Yoo Hae-jin	Nominated
2017	22nd Chunsa Film Art Awards	Best Actor	Yoo Hae-jin	Nominated
2017	12th University Film Festival of Korea	Best Actor	Yoo Hae-jin	Won
