= Key of Life =

- Poster
- Directed by: Kenji Uchida
- Written by: Kenji Uchida
- Produced by: Hiroshi Ohnishi; Kazumi Fukase; Satoshi Akagi
- Starring: Masato Sakai; Teruyuki Kagawa; Ryōko Hirosue
- Cinematography: Akira Sako
- Edited by: Shinichi Fushima
- Music by: Yuusuke Tanaka
- Distributed by: The Klockworx
- Release dates: June 16, 2012 (Shanghai International Film Festival); September 15, 2012 (Japan)
- Running time: 128 minutes
- Country: Japan
- Language: Japanese

Key of Life (Japanese: 鍵泥棒のメソッド, Hepburn: Kagi Dorobō no Mesoddo; lit. "(The/A) Key Thief's Method") is a 2012 Japanese comedy film directed by Kenji Uchida. The film opened in Japan on September 15, 2012. The movie's theme song "Tenbyō no Shikumi" (点描のしくみ) was written and performed by Kazuya Yoshii. The movie was remade in Korean in 2016 as Luck Key.

== Plot synopsis ==
The film begins by introducing its three principal characters: Kanae Mizushima is a mousy editor for a magazine that reviews all sorts of rare and luxury items, who announces her intention to marry despite not having found a husband; Takeshi Sakurai is an out-of-work and heavily indebted actor whose attempt to kill himself fails; Junitsu Kondo is a wealthy killer for hire who has just finished a job.

Their paths cross when Sakurai and Kondo go to the same bathhouse. Undressing near each other, Sakurai clearly envies Kondo's designer clothes and accessories, luxury car keys, and heavy wallet. When Kondo slips on a bar of soap and hits his head, knocking himself unconscious, Sakurai switches locker keys and uses Kondo's key to steal his clothes, car keys, wallet, and identity. His first action is to repay all of his debts. After doing so, Sakurai begins to feel guilty about stealing Kondo's identity and visit him in the hospital. There, Kondo wakes up, but it is clear that he has amnesia. Realizing that he can get away with what he did, Sakurai backs out of his plan to return what he stole to Kondo. He instead continues to live off of Kondo's wealth. The newly conscious Kondo, freshly discharged from the hospital, attempts to make sense of the life he assumes is his own but which is Sakurai's. On his way home from the hospital, Kondo meets Mizushima, who had been visiting her terminally ill father; she offers to give him a ride to his apartment, and they strike up a friendship. Eventually, despite having known him for a very brief amount of time, Mizushima asks Kondo to marry her, a request which he accepts confusedly.

Shortly after discovering that Kondo's luxury apartment has many secret storage areas filled with official-looking uniforms and other disguises, spy gadgets, and illegal weapons, Sakurai gets a call from a yakuza boss asking him to kill Ayako Inoue, the fiancée of the man whom Kondo killed in his first scene. After learning that almost no-one knows what Kondo looks like, and believing that he would be better off trying to refuse the job politely than simply hide from the yakuza, Sakurai agrees to meet the boss. The boss tells Sakurai that Ayako's fiancé stole a large amount of money from the yakuza syndicate and that he is sure that Ayako knows where it is hidden. She persists in pleading ignorance. Sakurai is appalled by the prospect of having to kill someone but is unable to refuse the contract. He plots to save Ayako from the mob boss somehow.

Meanwhile, Kondo and Mizushima attend the funeral of her father, who died before he could see his daughter married. While sorting through her father's possessions, Mizushima plays a Beethoven record. The sound of the music causes Kondo to spontaneously recollect his past life, and he seeks out Sakurai to call him to account for what he has done. Realizing, however, that the yakuza lieutenant Kudo is coming to punish Sakurai for failing to kill Ayako, he is forced to help Sakurai evade the mobsters pursuing him.

Kondo reveals that despite all appearances he is not really a contract killer — he fakes his targets' deaths and arranges for them to go into hiding and begin new lives. Kondo helped Ayako's fiancé get away and convinced him that it was necessary to give up the stolen money as part of taking on a new identity. Unfortunately, Kondo doesn't know what became of the money after that.

Making an educated guess, Kudo intercepts the group at Ayako's home. Before he can exact his retribution, Mizushima notices that the apparently mundane contents of the Inoue's house deserve a second glance, due to knowledge gained while working for her magazine. She reveals that the missing money is hidden right under their noses, giving off-the-cuff appraisals of assorted furnishings and belongings (such as a highly sought-after vintage dresser and a rare electric guitar). Ayako's facade as the unknowing innocent finally cracks when she rages at Mizushima for foiling her plan, convincing Kudo that selling the furniture and other items is a better option than taking their lives. After Kudo lets them leave, they call the police. Kudo and his men are arrested for burglary, being unable to explain why they are emptying the contents of a house that doesn't belong to them. Despite initial hesitance at returning to a man she doesn't really know, Mizushima makes up with Kondo, and they embrace.

In a post-credits scene, the cat belonging to one of Sakurai's neighbors wanders into his apartment, and as she comes to retrieve it, she notices Sakurai treating it well and falls in love with him, indicated by her staring longingly at him to the sound of a car alarm blaring.

== Cast ==
- Masato Sakai as Sakurai
- Teruyuki Kagawa as Kondo
- Ryōko Hirosue as Kanae
- Yoshiyoshi Arakawa as Kudō
- Yoko Moriguchi as Ayako Inoue

== Awards ==
The film won Best Narrative Feature at the Hawaii International Film Festival in 2012

The film was nominated for three awards at the Asia-Pacific Film Festival: Best Actor (Masato Sakai), Best Director (Kenji Uchida), and Best Supporting Actor (Teruyuki Kagawa). It won Best Screenplay at the Awards of the Japanese Academy, Kinema Junpo Awards, and the Shanghai International Film Festival.
