= Park Jung-woo (actor) =

South Korean actor (born 1996)

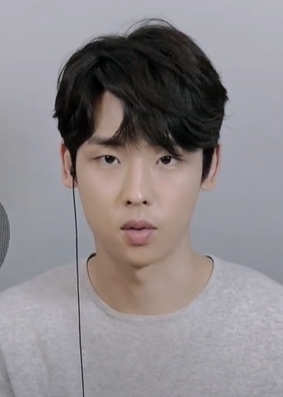
- Park in 2019
- Born: 19 January 1996 (age 30); South Korea
- Occupation: Actor
- Years active: 2017–present
- Agent: Varo Entertainment

Korean name
- Hangul: 박정우
- RR: Bak Jeongu
- MR: Pak Chŏngu

Park Jung-woo is a South Korean actor.

== Filmography ==
=== Film ===
Year	Title	Role	Notes	Ref.
2019	Spring Night	Do Joon	Short film	
2022	20th Century Girl	Baek Hyun-jin	Netflix film	
2023	Brave Citizen	Go Jin-hyeong		

=== Television series ===
Year	Title	Role	Ref.
2020	Hospital Playlist	Jang Ga-eul (cameo)	
2021	Team Bulldog: Off-Duty Investigation	Min Dae-jin	
2021	Hospital Playlist 2	Jang Ga-eul (cameo)	
2021	Fly High Butterfly	Moo Yeol	

=== Web series ===
Year	Title	Role	Ref.
2017–2019	Love Playlist	Kang Yoon	
2021	D.P.	Shin Woo-suk	
