= Chan Ho-kei =

Hong Kong novelist (born 1975)

- Born: 1975 (age 50–51); Hong Kong
- Education: Chinese University of Hong Kong
- Occupation: Crime novelist
- Years active: 2008 - present
- Notable work: The Borrowed, Second Sister

Chinese name
- Traditional Chinese: 陳浩基
- Simplified Chinese: 陈浩基
Transcriptions
Standard Mandarin
- Hanyu Pinyin: Chén hàojī
Yue: Cantonese
- Jyutping: can4 hou3 gei1

Chan Ho-kei is an author of mystery novels from Hong Kong. He writes in Chinese and many of his novels have been translated into English and other languages.

== Biography ==
Chan was born and raised in Hong Kong and studied computer science at the Chinese University of Hong Kong. Besides writing, he has worked as a software engineer and video game designer, and also as an editor of comic magazines.

He started writing in 2008 with the short story The case of Jack and the Beanstalk (Chinese: 傑克魔豆殺人事件) which was shortlisted for the Mystery Writers of Taiwan award. In 2009 he won the 7th Mystery Writers of Taiwan Award with his short story The Locked Room of Bluebeard, published in Chinese as 藍鬍子的密室.

In 2011 he won the 2nd Soji Shimada Mystery Award (an award created by Soji Shimada to honour classic detective mysteries in Chinese) with his first novel The Man Who Sold the World (遺忘·刑警). It was translated into Italian as Duplice Delitto a Hong Kong by Riccardo Moratto and also published in Thailand and Japan, as well as mainland China and Taiwan.

"The most powerful element of a mystery novel, to me, is its ability to deceive and shock the viewer at the end of the story. The twist changes how you see everything [that came before it]."

— Chan Ho-Kei

His novel The Borrowed (initially published in Chinese as 13·67 in 2014) is a set of six crime stories set in Hong Kong between 1967 and 2013 and focussing on the relationship between Inspector Kwan and his protegé. It won the 2015 Taipei International Book Fair Award, the Eslite Bookstore Readership Award and the first Hong Kong Literature Season Recommendation Award. It was translated into English by Singaporean writer Jeremy Tiang and published in 2017 by Grove Atlantic. It has also been translated into Indonesian (as 13·67), German (by Sabine Längsfeld, from the English translation, as Das Auge von Hongkong), French (by Alexis Brossolet as Hong Kong Noir), Dutch (also as Hong Kong Noir) and Japanese (as 13·67). In Japan, it won the Booklog 2018 grand prize for best overseas novel and the Honyaku mystery readers' award for a translated work. It was also shortlisted for the Best Translated Honkaku Mystery of the Decade (2010-2019). Many reviewers mentioned that besides the mystery story, the book also provided a rare insight into Hong Kong's social situation.

His novel Second Sister, which deals with hacking and sexual harassment was published in 2017 in Chinese as 網內人. It was also translated by Jeremy Tiang and released in English in 2020. It has also been translated into Japanese and German (by Sabine Längsfeld, from the English translation). Reviewers mentioned the elaborate plot and the details about life in Hong Kong.

== Bibliography ==
Books published in English

- The Borrowed, Grove Atlantic, 2017, ISBN 9780802125880 (2014 in Chinese as 13·67)
- Second Sister, Grove Atlantic, 2020, ISBN 9780802129475 (2017 in Chinese as 網內人)
