= Lee Yoon-jung =

South Korean TV producer (born 1976)

- Born: January 31, 1974 (age 52); South Korea
- Education: Yonsei University - Bachelor's degree in Journalism and Broadcasting
- Occupations: Television producer, director
- Years active: 1997 to present
- Employers: MBC Drama Department (1997–2014); Studio Dragon, CJ E&M Studio (2014–2024); Trii Studio (Imaginus) (2023-present)

Korean name
- Hangul: 이윤정
- RR: I Yunjeong
- MR: I Yunjŏng

Lee Yoon-jung (Korean: 이윤정, born January 31, 1974) is a South Korean television director and producer. She started her broadcasting career in television station MBC in 1997. She garnered attention for her distinctive directing style, particularly in short dramas like "Taereung National Village" and drama Beating Heart. Lee is best known for directing the popular drama Coffee Prince.

== Early life and education ==
Lee was born on January 31, 1974. During middle school, she was inspired by director Hwang In-roe's MBC drama What Do Women Live by? and began to aspire to a career in broadcasting. After graduating from high school, she enrolled at Yonsei University to pursue a bachelor's degree in Journalism and Broadcasting. Throughout her four years at university, Lee gained practical experience by actively participating in theater clubs and school broadcasts.

== Career ==
=== 1997–2014: Career at MBC ===
In her senior year, Lee applied to several media and advertising firms but faced a series of rejections. This period proved difficult, causing her to doubt her professional capabilities. Her break came in 1997 when she joined the drama production department at MBC. In the early 2000s, female directors were notably scarce within drama divisions, especially when compared to other areas of broadcasting.

Lee began her career as an assistant director for MBC Best Theatre. In 2001, she worked under director Kim Jin-man on the Jung Yoo-kyung-penned The Story of My Fiancée (2001). That same year, she served as assistant director for Kwon Suk-jang in writer Ki Seung-tae's Stamp on the Heart (2001). She continued building her portfolio by assisting director Jang Geun-su in sunday morning drama Something About 1% (2003) and working under Choi Lee-seop for the daily drama Pretty Woman (2004).

Lee’s career reached a turning point in February 2005 when she made history as MBC's first female director, debuting with the MBC Best Theatre Magic Power Alcohol. Her appointment came at a time when women were significantly underrepresented in the field. By the end of 2005, MBC employed only two female directors, while KBS had four and SBS had none. Lee further established her reputation with the weekend drama Beating Heart, receiving praise for her direction of the "Wind" episode.

Later that year, MBC selected Lee to helm the four-part miniseries Taereung Athletes' Village, the inaugural production of the revived MBC Best Theatre after a six-month hiatus. Written by Hong Jin-ah, the series follows the lives of national athletes at the Taereung National Village, balancing the professional pressures of elite sports with the personal dynamics of a competitive training environment. The project drew significant attention for Lee's distinct directorial style.

In 2007, Lee served as the assistant director for Ahn Pan-seok's Behind the White Tower. The series was adapted by screenwriter Lee Ki-won from the novel Shiroi Kyotō by Toyoko Yamasaki. Through a satirical lens, the drama examines medical malpractice and power struggles within the hospital hierarchy. The narrative centers on the contrasting paths and personalities of two doctors, portrayed by Kim Myung-min and Lee Sun-kyun, highlighting their contrasting paths and personalities. The production was widely lauded for its well-crafted direction and storytelling.

Later that same year, Lee made her feature-length television miniseries debut as a lead director with Coffee Prince, reuniting with actors Lee Sun-kyun and Kim Chang-wan. Based on the novel by Lee Sun-mi and scripted by Lee Jung-ah and Jang Hyun-joo, the drama stars Yoon Eun-hye as Go Eun-chan, a woman who disguises herself as a man to secure employment, and Gong Yoo as Choi Han-gyeol, a wealthy entrepreneur. An unexpected romance develops between the two, though Han-gyeol is initially unaware of Eun-chan's true gender. The series aired on MBC on Mondays and Tuesdays from July 2 to August 28, 2007, spanning 17 episodes. Coffee Prince became a major commercial success, earning high viewership ratings and critical acclaim. Lee was specifically praised for her artistic and distinctive directing style, and the drama went on to win multiple industry awards.

Lee reunited with actor Lee Sun-kyun for the MBC series Triple. The drama follows Lee Ha-ru (Min Hyo-rin), an aspiring figure skater who moves to Seoul to live with her stepbrother, Shin Hwal (Lee Jung-jae), and his two roommates (Yoon Kye-sang and Lee Sun-kyun). The story develops as Ha-ru’s new coach (Lee Ha-na) is revealed to be Hwal's estranged wife. The series aired on MBC on Wednesdays and Thursdays from June 11 to July 30, 2009, spanning 16 episodes. While Triple struggled with low viewership, Lee was lauded for her evocative dialogue and the creation of distinctive characters. Critics specifically noted her skill in crafting "sensational" scenes and sets, while the drama's complex, six-way romantic arcs maintained viewer interest. The show's visual appeal also had a real-world impact; the filming locations in Hapjeong-dong and the gallery cafe 'Etoir' in Seogyo-dong became popular destinations for fans.

In 2012, Lee returned to an assistant director role for the medical drama Golden Time, marking another collaboration with director Kwon Seok-jang following their 2003 project on MBC Best Theatre. The series, written by Choi Hee-ra, was a significant success and received a three-episode extension.

Two years later, she directed the two-part special 4teen for the MBC Drama Festival, based on the coming-of-age novel of the same name by Japanese author Ira Ishida. In the spring of 2014, Lee announced her intention to leave MBC to pursue a career as a freelance director. She officially resigned from the network in May of that year.

=== 2014–2022: Career at CJ E&M as freelance director ===
After leaving MBC, Lee’s first project as a director was the 2015 tvN drama Heart to Heart. The series reunited her with Coffee Prince writer Lee Jung-ah and actress Choi Kang-hee, who had previously worked with Lee on the 2005 drama Beating Heart. The story centers on the relationship between an obsessive-compulsive psychiatrist (Chun Jung-myung) and a patient with severe social anxiety (Choi Kang-hee) who disguises herself as an elderly man to navigate the world. It aired on Fridays from January 9 to March 7, 2015, spanning 16 episodes.

Lee’s second project was the television series television series Cheese in the Trap, adapted from the popular Naver Webtoon of the same name. Because the webtoon was still in serialization during production, the drama eventually featured an original ending. Starring Park Hae-jin, Kim Go-eun, Seo Kang-joon, and Lee Sung-kyung, the 16-episode series aired on tvN from January 4 to March 1, 2016. Cheese in the Trap was a major commercial success in both South Korea and China. Its distribution rights were sold to Chinese platforms for a record-breaking $125,000 per episode, making it the most expensive cable series at the time of its release. While the drama was lauded for its authentic portrayal of university life, it later faced significant backlash. Viewers criticized the production for deviating from the source material, particularly regarding the perceived increased focus on the second male lead and for a rushed finale that left many audiences dissatisfied.

In 2017, Lee served as a mentor for the O'PEN Writers Contest (Note: O'PEN is CJ E&M's collaboration with its drama production subsidiaries Studio Dragon and CJ Cultural Foundation to provide an open creative space and opportunity for those who dream of becoming a pen (a writer): television and film scriptwriters. This is a creative development and debut support project that supports the entire process from script planning and development, video production, organization and business matching. CJ E&M boosts investment ₩13 billion (season 1) (approx. US$18 million) to grow drama and movie writers.) and was tasked with directing the drama based on the winning script. During the final review process, she encountered the script for Anthology by Shin Ha-eun. Lee later remarked that she found the script exceptionally compelling, prompting her to request a meeting with Shin following the competition.

Lee subsequently invited Shin to join the writing team for the 2017 tvN series Argon, alongside writers Joon Young-shin and Joo Won-gyu. The eight-episode miniseries follows "Team Argon," an investigative news program led by meticulous anchor Kim Baek-jin (Kim Joo-hyuk) and a contract reporter, Lee Yeon-hwa (Chun Woo-hee), who aspires to a permanent position. Argon aired from September 4 to 26, 2017, and received positive reviews for its performances and its depiction of the media industry. The series was among the final projects completed by Kim Joo-hyuk before his death in October 2017.

In November 2017, Lee fulfilled her earlier commitment by directing Shin's winning script, a one-act drama titled Anthology (Collection of Poem). Starring Shin Eun-soo and Lee Jae-won, the production aired on January 6, 2018, as the sixth installment of 10 episodes of tvN Drama Stage series. (Note: Drama Stage (Korean: 드라마 스테이지; RR: Deurama Seuteiji) is a South Korean television program that showcases ten one-act dramas, resembling KBS2's Drama Special. Each episode was written by writers chosen from the O'PEN "Drama Storyteller Exhibition," a scriptwriting competition hosted by CJ E&M, These scripts are then made into one-act dramas produced by CJ E&M's subsidiary Studio Dragon in collaboration with other companies. The show is broadcast on tvN every Saturday at midnight.)

In 2019, Lee reunited with Joon Young-shin to adapt Joo Won-gyu's novel, Anti-Human Declaration, into a drama. Developed and produced by Studio Dragon for OCN, the series was titled The Lies Within and starred Lee Yoo-young and Lee Min-ki. It aired from October 12 to December 1, 2019, marking Lee's first venture into the mystery genre.

In 2022, Lee co-wrote and co-directed the television series Summer Strike with Hong Moon-pyo. Starring Kim Seol-hyun and Yim Si-wan, the series is based on the webtoon of the same name by Joo Young-hyun. Produced by GTist, the show is a Genie TV original and is available for streaming on its platform and the OTT service Seezn. It also aired on ENA from November 21 to December 27, 2022, in the Monday and Tuesday.

=== 2022 to present: Career at Studio Trii, Imaginus' Label ===
In March 2024, it was reported that Lee joined Studio Trii as a creator, alongside director Lee Na-jeong. Studio Trii, established in June 2022 by CEO Kim Jin-yi, operates as a production label under Imaginus, a media firm founded by former Studio Dragon CEO Choi Jin-hee.

Lee is currently directing the Netflix original series Show Business (formerly titled Slowly Intensely), written by Noh Hee-kyung. Confirmed by Netflix in February 2025, the series features a high-profile cast including Song Hye-kyo, Gong Yoo, Cha Seung-won, Lee Ha-nui, and Kim Seol-hyun. Set within the Korean entertainment industry between the 1960s and 1980s, the drama explores the lives of individuals striving for success during a period of significant social upheaval.

== Directing style ==
Lee’s directorial approach is deeply rooted in the mentorship she received at MBC. She has cited senior directors Hwang In-roe and Ahn Pan-seok as her primary influences, noting that her formative training under Ahn, even during a brief period of a few months, was more impactful than her nearly seven years as an assistant director. This mentorship helped shape her aversion to conventional broadcast tropes. Lee consciously avoids "action-and-reaction" directing, which she believes can evoke shallow emotional responses. Instead of following standardized storyboards, she seeks to present alternative perspectives on character behavior. For instance, she famously expressed a dislike for the cliché of a protagonist making a screeching U-turn to signal a sudden change of heart, preferring to challenge the audience's easy acceptance of such dramatic conventions.

A hallmark of Lee's work is the emphasis on the agency of female protagonists. She has actively sought to challenge romantic comedy stereotypes, where female leads are often portrayed as either overly arrogant or entirely submissive to male counterparts. In Lee's dramas, female characters are defined by their proactive nature. In Heart to Heart, the protagonist navigates a seven-year unrequited love with persistence despite her social phobia. While the female characters in Taereung Athletes' Village, such as Bang Soo-ah and Jeong Ma-ru, are depicted as fearlessly pursuing their personal goals and romantic interests. By centering the story on active choices of these women, Lee’s work resists the objectification often found in traditional domestic dramas.

Lee's filmography is dominated by coming-of-age dramas. While her protagonists are typically adults, her narratives consistently explore themes of personal growth through the lens of "growing pains", depicting failure, crisis, and emotional trials with a perspective often described by critics as calm and empathetic. A recurring visual and symbolic motif in her work is the use of rain to represent the vitality and "refreshing essence" of youth. The mise-en-scène of youth running in the rain is consistently present throughout her filmography. This aesthetic is further reinforced by her long-standing collaboration with music director Tearliner, whose work has become inextricably linked to Lee's projects. Their partnership began with Taereung Athletes' Village (2005) and continued through several major works, including Coffee Prince, 4teen, Heart to Heart, and Cheese in the Trap.

Beyond her partnership with Tearliner, Lee is known for maintaining recurring professional relationships with a variety of creative collaborators in the drama industry. She has partnered twice with director Kwon Seok-jang on the productions Stamp on the Heart and Golden Time. Her writing partnerships are notably consistent, having collaborated with several writers on multiple projects. She teamed with Lee Jung-ah for both Coffee Prince and Heart to Heart, and with Shin Ha-eun for the mini-series Argon and the one-act drama Anthology. Additionally, she worked with writers Joon Young-shin and Joo Won-gyu on both Argon and The Lies Within.

Her casting choices also reflect a preference for recurring collaborators. Lee Sun-kyun remains one of her most frequent stars, appearing in five of her projects including Taereung Athletes' Village, Behind the White Tower, Coffee Prince, Triple, and Golden Time Followed by Kim Chang-wan, who appeared in Beating Heart, Behind the White Tower and Coffee Prince. Other actors who have worked with Lee on two separate productions include Lee Sung-min in Triple and Golden Time, Lee Min-ki in Taereung Athletes' Village and The Lies Within, and Choi Kang-hee in Beating Heart and Heart to Heart.

== Filmography ==
=== Television series ===
Television drama credits
Year	Title		Network	Credited as		Ref.
Year	English	Korean	Network	Assistant director	Director	Ref.
2001	Best Theatre - The Story of My Fiancée	베스트극장 - 내 약혼녀 이야기	MBC	Yes	Kim Jin-man	
2001	Best Theatre - Stamp your heart	베스트극장 - 마음에 도장을 찍다	MBC	Yes	Kwon Seok-jang	
2003	Something About 1%	1%의 어떤 것	MBC	Yes	Jang Geun-Su	
2003–2004	Pretty Woman	귀여운 여인	MBC	Yes	Choi Lee-seop	
2005	Best Theatre - Magic Power Alcohol	베스트극장 - 매직파워 알콜	MBC	—N/a	Yes	
2005	Best Theatre - Taereung Athletes' Village	베스트극장 - 태릉선수촌	MBC	—N/a	Yes	
2005	Beating Heart	떨리는 가슴	MBC	—N/a	Yes	
2007	Behind the White Tower	하얀 거탑	MBC	Yes	Ahn Pan-seok	
2007	Coffee Prince	커피프린스 1호점	MBC	—N/a	Yes	
2009	Triple	트리플	MBC	—N/a	Yes	
2012	Golden Time	골든타임	MBC	Yes	Kwon Seok-jang	
2014	Drama Festival - Fourteen	드라마 페스티벌 - 포틴	MBC	—N/a	Yes	
2015	Heart to Heart	하트 투 하트	tvN	—N/a	Yes	
2016	Cheese in the Trap	치즈인더트랩	tvN	—N/a	Yes	
2017	Argon	아르곤	tvN	—N/a	Yes	
2017	Drama Stage: Anthology	드라마 스테이지 - 문집	tvN	—N/a	Yes	
2019	The Lies Within	모두의 거짓말	OCN	—N/a	Yes	
2022	Summer Strike	아무것도 하고 싶지 않아	ENA	Hong Moon-pyo	Yes	
TBA	Tantara	천천히 강렬하게	Netflix	—N/a	Yes	

== Accolades ==
Awards and nominations
Year	Award	Category	Recipient	Result	Ref.
2008	44th Baeksang Arts Awards	Best Director – Television	Coffee Prince	Won	
2008	44th Baeksang Arts Awards	Best Drama	Coffee Prince	Nominated	
2008	20th Korea Production Director Awards	Best Drama	Coffee Prince	Won	
2012	MBC Drama Awards	Drama of the Year	Golden Time	Nominated	
2013	49th Baeksang Arts Awards	Best Director – Television	Golden Time (Note: Nomination shared with Kwon Seok-jang)	Nominated	
