= List of Drama Stage episodes =

This is a list of episodes of the South Korean TV series Drama Stage (a/k/a O'PENing and tvN X TVING Short Drama Curation). The show airs on tvN, OCN (selected episodes) and TVING.

== Series overview ==
Season	Episodes	Originally released	
Season	Episodes	First released	Last released
1	10	December 2, 2017	February 3, 2018
2	10	December 1, 2018	February 2, 2019
3	10	November 23, 2019	January 30, 2020
4	10	March 3, 2021	April 21, 2021
5	12	May 2, 2022	August 5, 2022
6	8	July 16, 2023	August 27, 2023
7	7	July 15, 2024	October 20, 2024
8	5	August 17, 2025	December 9, 2025

== Episodes ==
=== Season 1 ===
Ep.	Title	Director	Screenwriter	Production company	Original broadcast date	Average audience share (Note: This drama airs on a cable channel/pay TV which normally has a relatively smaller audience compared to free-to-air TV/public broadcasters (KBS, SBS, MBC and EBS).)	Ref.
1	Assistant Manager Park's Private Life (박대리의 은밀한 사생활)	Yoon Seong-ho	Choi Ji-hoon	Studio Dragon; Hyemil Pictures	December 2, 2017	0.9%	
2	Chief B and the Love Letter (B주임과 러브레터)	Yoon Hyun-gi	Shin Soo-rim	Studio Dragon; The Unicorn	December 9, 2017	1.3%	
3	History of Walking Upright (직립보행의 역사)	Jang Jeong-do	Choi Seong-wook	Studio Dragon	December 16, 2017	0.6%	
4	The Picnic Day (소풍 가는 날)	Myung Hyun-woo	Lee Jung-min	Studio Dragon	December 23, 2017	0.6%	
5	Today I Grab the Tambourine Again (오늘도 탬버린을 모십니다)	Choi Gyu-sik	Kim Dong-kyung	Studio Dragon; The Queen AMC	December 28, 2017 (Note: Today I Grab the Tambourine Again aired on December 28, 2017, instead of the scheduled Saturday at midnight broadcast due to the canceled episodes of Prison Playbook.)	1.5%	
6	Anthology (문집)	Lee Yoon-jung	Shin Ha-eun	Studio Dragon; MinK Entertainment	January 6, 2018	0.6%	
6	Cast: One, Shin Eun-soo, Seo Hyun-woo						
7	Not Played (낫 플레이드)	Yoo Jong-seon	Kang Min-soo	Studio Dragon	January 13, 2018	1.4%	
8	Our Place's Tasty Soybean Paste (우리 집은 맛나 된장 맛나)	Kim Sang-ho	Yoon Jo	Studio Dragon; JS Pictures	January 20, 2018	1.0%	
9	Fighter Choi Kang-soon (파이터 최강순)	Sung Yong-il	Yoo Young-joo	Studio Dragon; Curo Holdings	January 27, 2018	0.9%	
10	The Woman Who Makes the Last Meal (마지막 식사를 만드는 여자)	Hwang Joon-hyuk	Park Joo-yeon	Studio Dragon; Urban Works Media	February 3, 2018	1.5%	

=== Season 2 ===
Ep.	Title	Director	Screenwriter	Production company	Original broadcast date	Average audience share	Ref.
1	Withdrawal Person (인술책)	Lee Tae-gon	Jung Soo-hoon	Studio Dragon; Soul Pictures	December 1, 2018	1.4%	
2	Water Scale (물비늘)	Shin Soo-won	Lee Ah-yeon	Studio Dragon; June Film	December 8, 2018	0.6%	
3	All About My Rival in Love (내 연적의 모든 것)	Ahn Kook-jin	Kim Bo-kyum	Studio Dragon; Belief	December 15, 2018	0.6%	
4	Push and Out of Prison (밀어서 감옥 해제)	Jung Jae-eun	Hong Hye-yi	Studio Dragon; B.A.D.	December 22, 2018	0.7%	
5	Jin Choo-Ha Returns (진추하가 돌아왔다)	Sung Do-joon	Song Jin	Studio Dragon; iHQ	December 27, 2018	1.0%	
6	Goodbye My Life (굿-바이 내 인생보험)	Lee Ho-jae	Choe Sung-Jun	Studio Dragon; One Fine Day Films	December 29, 2018	1.0%	
7	Like a Dog, Like a Beggar, Beautiful (개같다 거지같다 아름답다)	Lim Tae-woo	Kim Ji-hoon	Studio Dragon; Drama House Studio	January 5, 2019	1.1%	
8	The Dramatization Has Begun (각색은 이미 시작됐다)	Jung Hyun-geun	Kim Do-yeon	Studio Dragon; Crank Up	January 19, 2019	0.6%	
9	Crumbling Friendship (반야)	Yoon Hyung-gi	Yoo Kyung-min	Studio Dragon; The Unicorn	January 26, 2019	0.6%	
10	Waves of Change (파고)	Park Jung-beom	Kim Min-kyung	Studio Dragon; Second Wind Film	February 2, 2019	0.3%	

=== Season 3 ===
Ep.	Title	Director	Screenwriter	Production company	Original broadcast date	Average audience share	Ref.
1	Ogre (오우거)	Yoon Jung-ho	Chae Woo	Studio Dragon; Binge Works	November 23, 2019	1.4%	
2	My Wife's Bed (아내의 침대)	Min Doo-sik	Lee Hee-soo	Studio Dragon; DK E&M	November 30, 2019	1.3%	
3	Woman with a Bleeding Ear (귀피를 흘리는 여자)	Lee Seung-hoon	Baek In-ah	Studio Dragon; DK E&M	December 7, 2019	1.0%	
4	My Uncle is Audrey Hepburn (삼촌은 오드리헵번)	Kim Sae-byeol	Shim Bo-young	Studio Dragon; Hidden Sequence	December 18, 2019	1.4%	
5	Big Data Romance (빅데이터 연애)	Joo Sang-kyu	Jung Hee-sun	Studio Dragon; Binge Works	December 25, 2019	0.7%	
6	My Husband Has Kim Hee-seon (남편한테 김희선이 생겼어요)	Kim Jung-wook	Kim Joo-hoo	Studio Dragon; Hidden Sequence	January 1, 2020	0.9%	
7	Blackout (블랙아웃)	Park Bong-seob	Sae Bom	Studio Dragon; DK E&M	January 8, 2020	0.6%	
8	Everyone Is There (모두 그곳에 있다)	Ryu Seung-jin	Son Ho-young	Studio Dragon; Binge Works	January 16, 2020	0.8%	
9	I Object (이의 있습니다)	Jang Yang-ho	Bae Yi-hwa	Studio Dragon; Binge Works	January 23, 2020	0.7%	
10	Out of Communication Range (통화권이탈)	Seo Joo-hwan	Ha Yu-rim	Studio Dragon; Hidden Sequence	January 30, 2020		

=== Season 4 ===
Ep.	Title	Director	Screenwriter	Production company	Original broadcast date	Average audience share	Ref.
1	Mint Condition (민트 컨디션)	Jung Hyeong-geom	Bang So-min	Studio Dragon; Artist Studio	March 3, 2021	1.097%	
2	EP, Hi Dorothy (EP, 안녕 도로시)	Kim Yoon-jin	Baek Yi-shin	Studio Dragon; Supermoon Pictures	March 10, 2021	1.125%	
3	Deok-gu Is Back (덕구 이즈 백)	Heo Seok-won	Kim Hae-nok	Studio Dragon; Sunny Park	March 15, 2021	1.973%	
4	Park Sung-sil's Fourth Industrial Revolution (박성실씨의 사차 산업혁명)	Park Ji-hyun	Song Young-joon	Studio Dragon; DK E&M	March 16, 2021	1.847%	
5	Attention Seeker (관종)	Lee Ye-rim	Lee Bom	Studio Dragon; Supermoon Pictures	March 17, 2021		
6	Love Spoiler (러브 스포일러)	Kim Gun-hong	Hong Eun-joo	Studio Dragon; DK E&M	March 24, 2021	0.746%	
7	On the Way to the Gynecologist (산부인과로 가는길)	Kim Yang-hee	Lee Ha-ni	Studio Dragon; Sunny Park	March 31, 2021	1.357%	
8	The Fair (더 페어)	Min Jung-ah	Chu Hyun-jung	Studio Dragon	April 7, 2021	0.872%	
9	Substitute Person (대리인간)	Jo Nam-hyeong	Cha Yi-han	Studio Dragon	April 14, 2021	0.859%	
10	Lucky (럭키)	Kim Sae-byeol	Jin Yoon-joo	Studio Dragon; Artist Studio	April 21, 2021		

=== Season 5 ===
Ep.	Title	Director	Screenwriter	Production company	Original broadcast date	Average audience share	Ref.
1 (Part 1)	Shared Office Hookup (오피스에서 뭐하Share?)	Kim Kang-kyu	Choi Bo-yoon	Studio Dragon; Fantagio	May 2, 2022	2.267%	
1 (Part 1)	Cast: Lee Hak-joo, Ha Yoon-kyung, Jung Jae-kwang						
1 (Part 2)	Shared Office Hookup (오피스에서 뭐하Share?)	Kim Kang-kyu	Choi Bo-yoon	Studio Dragon; Fantagio	May 3, 2022	2.018%	
1 (Part 2)	Cast: Lee Hak-joo, Ha Yoon-kyung, Jung Jae-kwang						
2 (Part 1)	XX+XY	Lee So-yoon	Hong Seong-yeon	Studio Dragon; GTist	May 9, 2022	1.858%	
2 (Part 1)	Cast: Ahn Hyun-ho, Choi Woo-sung, Kim Ji-in						
2 (Part 2)	XX+XY	Lee So-yoon	Hong Seong-yeon	Studio Dragon; GTist	May 10, 2022	1.541%	
2 (Part 2)	Cast: Ahn Hyun-ho, Choi Woo-sung, Kim Ji-in						
3	Find the 1st Prize (1등 당첨금 찾아가세요)	Park Hong-soo	Choi Si-eun	Studio Dragon; C-JeS Studios	June 17, 2022	0.4%	
3	Cast: Kim Do-yoon, Ryu Hyun-kyung, Shin Dong-woo						
4	Don't Announce Your Husband's Death (남편의 죽음을 알리지 마라)	Choi Dong-sook	Lim Soo-rim	Studio Dragon; GTist	June 24, 2022	0.536%	
4	Cast: Kim Nam-hee, Park So-jin						
5	The Apartment Is Beautiful (아파트는 아름다워)	Jo Eun-sol	Lee Yi-young	Studio Dragon; Fantagio	July 1, 2022	0.945%	
5	Cast: Park Hyo-joo, Seo Young-hee, Kwon Hyuk						
6	Flavor of Your Voice (목소리를 구분하는 방법)	Ham Seung-hoon	Han Yeon-joo	Studio Dragon; GTist	July 8, 2022	0.536%	
6	Cast: Lee Hong-nae, Choi Hee-jin						
7	First Glance (첫 눈길)	Kim Hyun-tak	Yoo Soo-mi	Studio Dragon; KPJ Corporation; Merry Christmas	July 15, 2022	0.374%	
7	Cast: Han Sun-hwa, Lee Jae-in, Kang Kil-woo						
8	Stock of High School (스톡 오브 하이스쿨)	Kang Hee-joo	Park Kyoung-hwa	Studio Dragon; DK E&M	July 22, 2022	0.251%	
8	Cast: Lee Re, Kim Si-eun, Kim Rachel Yoory						
9	Babel Syndrome (바벨 신드롬)	Chae Du-byeong	Lee Chan-young	Studio Dragon; Slingshot Studios	July 29, 2022	0.415%	
9	Cast: Choo Young-woo, Lee Si-woo						
10	The Underworld Rider (저승라이더)	Jung Jang-hwan	Hwang Seol-heon	Studio Dragon; Slingshot Studios	August 5, 2022	0.46%	
10	Cast: Seong Yu-bin, Jung Da-eun						

=== Season 6 ===
Ep.	Title	Director	Screenwriter	Production company	Original broadcast date	Average audience share	Ref.
1	Summer, Lovemachine, Blues (썸머, 러브머신 블루스)	Yoon Hye-ryeom	Lee Choong-ha	Studio Dragon; YLAB Plex	July 16, 2023	1.34%	
1	Cast: Arin, Go Soo						
2	A Walk (산책)	Noh Young-seop	Cheon Se-eun	Studio Dragon; Next Scene	July 23, 2023	1.028%	
2	Cast: Lee Soon-jae, Lee Yeon-hee, Sunwoo Yong-nyeo						
3	Summer Cold (여름감기)	Jung Jong-beom	Seo Hyun-joo	Studio Dragon; Jumbo Film	July 30, 2023	1.244%	
3	Cast: Uhm Ji-won, Park Ji-hwan						
4	One Reason We Can't Meet (우리가 못 만나는 이유 1가지)	Kim Dong-hui	Lee Ga-young	Studio Dragon; Neo Entertainment	August 6, 2023	0.601%	
4	Cast: Uee, Kang Sang-jun						
5	Don't Press the Peach (복숭아 누르지 마시오)	Jung Da-hyung	Park Sun-young	Studio Dragon; Studio Icon	August 13, 2023	1.084%	
5	Cast: Jung Yi-seo, Choi Won-young, Shin Hyun-soo						
6	2:15 (2시 15분)	Jung Se-ryung	Park Yeon-ok	Studio Dragon; Studio Coming Soon	August 20, 2023	1.004%	
6	Cast: Park So-yi, Ki So-yu, Lee Kyu-hyun						
7 (Part 1)	Perfect Shot (나를쏘다)	Jo Eun-sol	Jung Ji-hyun	Studio Dragon; Neo Entertainment	August 27, 2023		
Cast: Bae Gang-hee, Han Soo-ah, Lee Ki-taek, Jung Kyung-ho, Kim Hee-ra
7 (Part 2)	Perfect Shot (나를쏘다)	Jo Eun-sol	Jung Ji-hyun	Studio Dragon; Neo Entertainment	September 3, 2023		
Cast: Bae Gang-hee, Han Soo-ah, Lee Ki-taek, Jung Kyung-ho, Kim Hee-ra

==== 2024 Seollal Special ====
Ep.	Title	Director	Screenwriter	Production company	Original broadcast date	Average audience share	Ref.
1	Grand Shining Hotel (그랜드 샤이닝 호텔)	Myung Hyun-woo	Park Se-hyun	Studio Dragon; Movie Rock; Like M Company	February 17, 2024 (Note: It was uploaded on TVING as a six-episode series one day before the broadcast.)	0.8%	
1	Cast: Jung In-sun, Lee Ji-hoon, Kim Jae-kyung, Jeong Jin-woon						

=== Season 7 ===
Ep.	Title	Director	Screenwriter	Production company	Original broadcast date	Average audience share	Ref.
1	My Trouble-Maker Mom (덕후의 딸)	Kim Na-kyung	Kim Min-young	Studio Dragon; DK E&M	July 15, 2024	3.565%	
1	Cast: Kim Jung-young, Ha Young						
2	Miss. Junk (고물상 미란이)	Yoon So-il	Song Jung-mi	Studio Dragon; Like M Company	August 19, 2024	2.758%	
2	Cast: Im Se-mi, Lee Si-woo						
3 (Part 1)	Our Beautiful Summer (아름다운 우리 여름)	Jung Da-hyung	Choi Ha-neul	Studio Dragon; Studio Icon	September 14, 2024	1.125%	
3 (Part 1)	Cast: Jang Gyu-ri, Yoo Young-jae, Son Sang-yeon, Kim Min-gi, Kim So-hye						
3 (Part 2)	Our Beautiful Summer (아름다운 우리 여름)	Jung Da-hyung	Choi Ha-neul	Studio Dragon; Studio Icon	September 15, 2024	0.872%	
3 (Part 2)	Cast: Jang Gyu-ri, Yoo Young-jae, Son Sang-yeon, Kim Min-gi, Kim So-hye						
4	Unbalanced Love (브래지어 끈이 내려갔다)	Bang Soo-in	Shin Kyoung	Studio Dragon; NGene Film	September 22, 2024	1.696%	
4	Cast: Lee Joo-young, Shin Jae-ha						
5	The Son (아들이 죽었다)	Na Ji-hyun	Lee Soo-jin	Studio Dragon; Red Nine Pictures	October 8, 2024 (Note: Aired simultaneously on tvN and OCN Movies 2)	2.067% (Note: tvN viewership ratings)	
5	Cast: Jang Seung-jo, Lee Seol						
6 (Part 1)	Million Dollar Baby (수령인)	Yoo Beom-sang	Kim Ji-eun	Studio Dragon; Studio 1009	October 13, 2024 (Note: Aired simultaneously on OCN and OCN Movies 2)	0.2% (Note: OCN viewership ratings)	
6 (Part 1)	Cast: Kang Shin, Cho Jun-young, Noh Jong-hyun, Baek Sun-ho						
6 (Part 2)	Million Dollar Baby (수령인)	Yoo Beom-sang	Kim Ji-eun	Studio Dragon; Studio 1009	October 20, 2024	0.2%	
6 (Part 2)	Cast: Kang Shin, Cho Jun-young, Noh Jong-hyun, Baek Sun-ho						

==== 2025 Special ====
Ep.	Title	Director	Screenwriter	Production company	Original broadcast date	Average audience share	Ref.
1 (Part 1)	Surgical Road Trip (로드 투 외과의사)	Kim Jae-hong	Kim Se-hee	Studio Dragon; Nangmancrew	June 14, 2025	1.0%	
1 (Part 1)	Cast: Kim Gun-woo, Lee Won-jung, Jung Shin-hye						
1 (Part 2)	Surgical Road Trip (로드 투 외과의사)	Kim Jae-hong	Kim Se-hee	Studio Dragon; Nangmancrew	June 14, 2025	0.8%	
1 (Part 2)	Cast: Kim Gun-woo, Lee Won-jung, Jung Shin-hye						

=== Season 8 ===
Ep.	Title	Director	Screenwriter	Production company	Original broadcast date	Average audience share	Ref.
1	The Catstody War (냥육권 전쟁)	Yoo Hak-chan	Ji Soo-hee	Studio Dragon; GnG Production	August 17, 2025	1.27%	
1	Cast: Yoon Doo-joon, Kim Seul-gi						
2	Hwaja's Scarlet (화자의 스칼렛)	Yoo Si-yeon	Kang Seul	Studio Dragon; Blitzway Production	October 3, 2025	0.8%	
2	Cast: Oh Na-ra, Kim Si-eun, Seo Young-hee, Lee Jae-kyun						
3	Mission: The Birthday Invitation (내 딸 친구의 엄마)	Kim Na-kyung	Shin Yoo-jung	Studio Dragon; Good Wave, Inc.	October 8, 2025	1.525%	
3	Cast: Jeon Sung-woo, Park Jin-joo						
4	The Lake of That Day (그날의 호수)	Lee Myung-jin	Sung Da-hye	Studio Dragon; BY4M Studio; Studio Double M	December 8, 2025 (Note: The Lake of That Day aired on December 8, 2025 due to the postponed airing of episode 11 of Nice to Not Meet You, which aired a week later on December 15, 2025.)	1.922%	
4	Cast: Park Yu-rim, Cha Mi-kyung, Yu Ji-wan						
5	Housekeeper (하우스키퍼)	Jung Woo-sik	Han Seol	Studio Dragon; Studio Butter	December 9, 2025 (Note: Housekeeper aired on December 9, 2025 due to the postponed airing of episode 12 of Nice to Not Meet You, which aired a week later on December 16, 2025.)	1.985%	
5	Cast: Yoon Sang-jeong, Kang Na-eon, Jang Young-nam						

== Awards and nominations ==
Year	Award	Category	Nominated work	Result	Ref.
2022	APAN Star Awards	Best Short Drama	"XX+XY"	Nominated	
2022	APAN Star Awards	Best Short Drama	"Shared Office Hookup"	Nominated	
2022	APAN Star Awards	Best Short Drama	"Deok-gu Is Back"	Won	
2022	APAN Star Awards	Best Short Drama	"Finding a Child"	Nominated	
