= Happy Loner =

Happy Loner may refer to:

- The Happy Loner, a 2017 Korean television miniseries
- "Happy Loner", a 2021 single by Marina from her album Ancient Dreams in a Modern Land
