= Hyo-rin =

- Hangul: 효린
- RR: Hyorin
- MR: Hyorin

Hyo-rin is a Korean given name.

People with this name include:

- Hyolyn (born 1990), real name Kim Hyo-jung, South Korean singer, member of Sistar
- Min Hyo-rin (born 1986), real name Jung Eun-ran, South Korean actress and singer

== See also ==
- List of Korean given names
