= Doctor (2013 film) =

- Film poster
- Directed by: Kim Sung-hong
- Written by: Kim Sung-hong
- Starring: Kim Chang-wan; Bae So-eun
- Release date: 20 June 2013
- Running time: 97 minutes
- Country: South Korea
- Language: Korean

Doctor (Korean: 닥터) is a South Korean horror film written and directed by Kim Sung-hong, starring Kim Chang-wan in the lead role of a plastic surgeon who performs strange body experiments on his victims. A woman then goes to the plastic surgeon to seek out the perfect body. Through the surgery the women does receive the perfect body but also must now live out two separate lives. Actress Bae So-eun made her debut with the film. The film had its world premiere at the 17th Busan International Film Festival.

It was released in South Korea on 20 June 2013.

== Plot ==
Choi In-beom is a plastic surgeon married to Soon-jung. He is a psychopathic doctor who has mood swings. One fine day, he leaves for a surgery and tells his wife that he will be home late. As he leaves, Soon-jung shows her real side and hatred for her. She gets a call from Yong-kwan, who later arrives at her home. Still there, In-beom secretly enters his house and witnesses Soon-jung committing adultery. He feels betrayed and tries to kill her, but her mother rings the doorbell. Both In-beom and Yong-kwan escape separately. Yong-kwan is spotted by the mother who asks Soon-jung to calm down. It is revealed that Soon-jung's mother planned the marriage so that she could herself get whatever luxuries she wanted and to get her daughter cosmetic surgery.

In-beom follows Yong-kwan and finds out about him. Yong-kwan is visited by Soon-jung's mother, who warns him not to meet her again. In-beom soon visits her, tricks her into giving her a BOTOX injection, and instead kills her. At night, he gifts Soon-jung with a special meat. As she eats it, he laughs and reveals that it was her mother's thigh. Shocked, Soon-jung threatens In-beom with a knife. In-beom breaks a bottle over her head, leaving her unconscious and drags her into a dark room.

In-beom's mood swings make his nurses suspect him. He is soon visited by a young lady willing to get a breast surgery, whom he decides to surgically enhance to take Soon-jung's place. He starts the surgery without the consent of one of his senior nurses. When she refuses to help him, he kills her and another nurse who tries to stop the surgery. The lady dies due to lack of proper treatment. Nurse Kim is shocked to find blood and dead bodies. As she is about to leave, In-beom fantasizes her to be Soon-jung and tries to kill her, but she escapes and eventually calls the police. Yong-kwan finds out about In-beom and breaks into his house, where he finds Soon-jung bound and gagged. He takes her to a hospital. The police investigate and discover that Soon-jung is actually a copy of another lady.

While in hospital, In-beom secretly injects Soon-jung with a special drug, making her unable to speak. Yong-kwan too gets injected and beaten down badly by him. He slashes Soon-jung's left eyelid and rest of her face, then leaves amidst the chaos and police looking for him.

After a year, a patient with a plastic surgery comes to the doctor's cabin. As his face is revealed, a flashback shows that In-beom killed a roadside man and took his identity card, not before injuring his own face severely. As he now asks for a mirror to see his face, the doctor asks him if he is satisfied. In-beom shows his satisfaction but says that he used to like his name, In-beom, a lot and laughs.

== Cast ==
- Kim Chang-wan as Choi In-beom
- Bae So-eun as Park Soon-jeong
- Seo Gun-woo as Yong-kwan

== Reactions ==
In 2015, the lead actor Kim Chang-wan in an interview said that his decision to star in the film was a mistake and he had done so only to find out the mentality of the people who try to make this film.

Actress Bae So-eun caught the audience attention due to her graphic nudity in the film.

== Reception ==
Paul Quinn from Hangul Celluloid wrote "With 'Missing' having appeared to point to Kim Seong-hong as a director with a talent for realising visceral narratives in almost shocking but nonetheless gripping form, I for one was hopeful that 'Doctor' would further build his reputation within the horror genre. Sadly, though 'Doctor' is indeed notable it is so for largely the wrong reasons." A reviewer at HanCinema wrote "Doctor might be an interesting enough thriller while it establishes its elements, which are not groundbreaking by any stretch."
