= Tempest (TV series) =

2025 South Korean television series

- Promotional poster
- Hangul: 북극성
- Hanja: 北極星
- Lit.: Polaris
- RR: Bukgeukseong
- MR: Pukkŭksŏng
- Genre: Spy; Romance; Action
- Written by: Jeong Seo-kyeong
- Directed by: Heo Myung-haeng; Kim Hee-won
- Creative director: Kim Byeong-han
- Starring: Jun Ji-hyun; Gang Dong-won; John Cho; Lee Mi-sook; Park Hae-joon; Kim Hae-sook; Yoo Jae-myung; Oh Jung-se; Lee Sang-hee; Joo Jong-hyuk; Won Ji-an
- Music by: Jung Jae-il; Dalpalan
- Country of origin: South Korea
- Original language: Korean
- No. of episodes: 9

Production
- Cinematography: Lee Mo-gae
- Running time: 50–60 minutes
- Production companies: Imaginus; Showrunners; Studio AA; Seoul Action School; Skydance

Original release
- Network: Disney+
- Release: September 10 – October 1, 2025

Tempest (Korean: 북극성) is a South Korean spy romance television series written by Jeong Seo-kyeong and directed by Kim Hee-won. The series stars an ensemble cast led by Jun Ji-hyun and Gang Dong-won along with John Cho, Lee Mi-sook, Park Hae-joon, Kim Hae-sook, Yoo Jae-myung, Oh Jung-se, Lee Sang-hee, Joo Jong-hyuk, and Won Ji-an. It aired on Disney+ from September 10, to October 1, 2025.

== Synopsis ==
The story revolves around skilled diplomat Seo Mun-ju, who served as the country's UN ambassador, and Paik San-ho, a special agent of mysterious nationality. After an army soldier kills Mun-ju's presidential candidate husband, she and San-ho try to uncover the truth behind his murder, which includes her brother-in-law. As events unfold, they are thrust into a mission to expose the truth about a nuclear crisis that threatens the stability of the Korean Peninsula.

== Cast and characters ==
=== Main ===
- Jun Ji-hyun as Seo Mun-ju

A diplomat and former ambassador to the United Nations who earned deep trust in the international community through her judgment and actions.

- Gang Dong-won as Paik San-ho

A former top ace among international mercenaries whose nationality and past are shrouded in secrecy.

=== Supporting ===
==== Seo Mun-ju's family ====
- Lee Mi-sook as Lim Ok-seon

Chairwoman of Aseom Shipping and Mun-ju's mother-in-law.

- Park Hae-joon as Jang Jun-ik

A presidential candidate who dreams of peace and Mun-ju's husband.

- Oh Jung-se as Jang Jun-sang

A prosecutor consumed by feelings of inferiority toward his older brother Jun-ik.

- Jung Young-sook as Hwa-rim

Jun-ik's grandmother.

==== Seo Mun-ju's presidential campaign ====
- Lee Sang-hee as Yeo Mi-ji

Mun-ju's aide.

- Joo Jong-hyuk as Park Chang-hee

Jun-ik's aide.

==== Chae Kyung-sin's government ====
- Kim Hae-sook as Chae Kyung-sin

President of the Republic of Korea.

- Yoo Jae-myung as Yoo Un-hak

Director of the National Intelligence Service, who will do anything for the sake of national interest.

- Park Kyung-geun as Choi Jeong-gyu

Director of National Security Office.

- Jung Kyung-soon as Song Kyung-hwa

Minister of Foreign Affairs.

==== People around Jang Jun-ik ====
- John Cho as Anderson Miller

United States Deputy Secretary of State.

- Won Ji-an as Kang Han-na

A mysterious person who knows Jun-ik's secret.

==== Others ====
- Michael Gaston as Eagleton, United States Secretary of Defense
- Christopher Gorham as Ethan, a mercenary
- Spencer Garrett as Arnold Hauser, President of the United States
- Alicia Hannah-Kim
- Jacob Bertrand
- Joel de la Fuente
- Brooke Smith
- Park In-hwan as Father Yang
- Tom Lenk
- Caleb Sekeres
- Romy Rosemont
- Sebastian Roché

=== Special appearances ===
- Uhm Tae-goo as Kim Han-sang, Chairman of the National Defence Commission
- Kim Go-eun as Jin Su-ryeon
- Park Ji-hwan as Kim Ho-se

== Production ==
=== Development ===
Vice president of Imaginus announced several upcoming projects of Imaginus, including Polaris, which will be co-produced by Imaginus's label, Showrunner and Studio AA. Prior to that, in March 2023, it was reported that director Kim Hee-won and writer Jeong Seo-kyeong, who previously collaborated on Little Woman, joined forces again for a drama with working title Polaris. The drama is a spy melodrama exploring the journey of spies who have lost their identities and must find themselves. Later it was reported that Heo Myung-haeng, the director of The Roundup: Punishment and Badland Hunters (2024), joined as co-director. Seoul Action School and Skydance was also credited as co-producer. Jung Jae-il and Dalpalan serve as the series' music director.

Some Korean newspapers reported that the series cost between 50 and 70 billion won, but after the final episode aired, the director and writer denied the rumor.

=== Casting ===
Jun Ji-hyun has been offered the female lead role opposite Gang Dong-won. In August 2024, it was announced that John Cho, Christopher Gorham, Alicia Hannah-Kim and Jacob Bertrand had joined the cast. Other actors included Spencer Garrett, Brooke Smith, Tom Lenk, Michael Gaston, Joel de la Fuente and Romy Rosemont. In January 2025, it was reported that Kim Hae-sook, Lee Mi-sook, Yoo Jae-myung, Park Hae-joon and Joo Jong-hyuk were cast.

By incorporating Hollywood talent, Tempest made history as the first Korean series to be produced under a SAG-AFTRA contract.

=== Filming ===
Imaginus announced that Polaris had entered the preparation stage on March 28, 2024. The first meeting took place on the 25th. Imaginus further stated that filming for Polaris is planned to commence in April, with the possibility of shooting in international locations being taken into account.

== Release ==
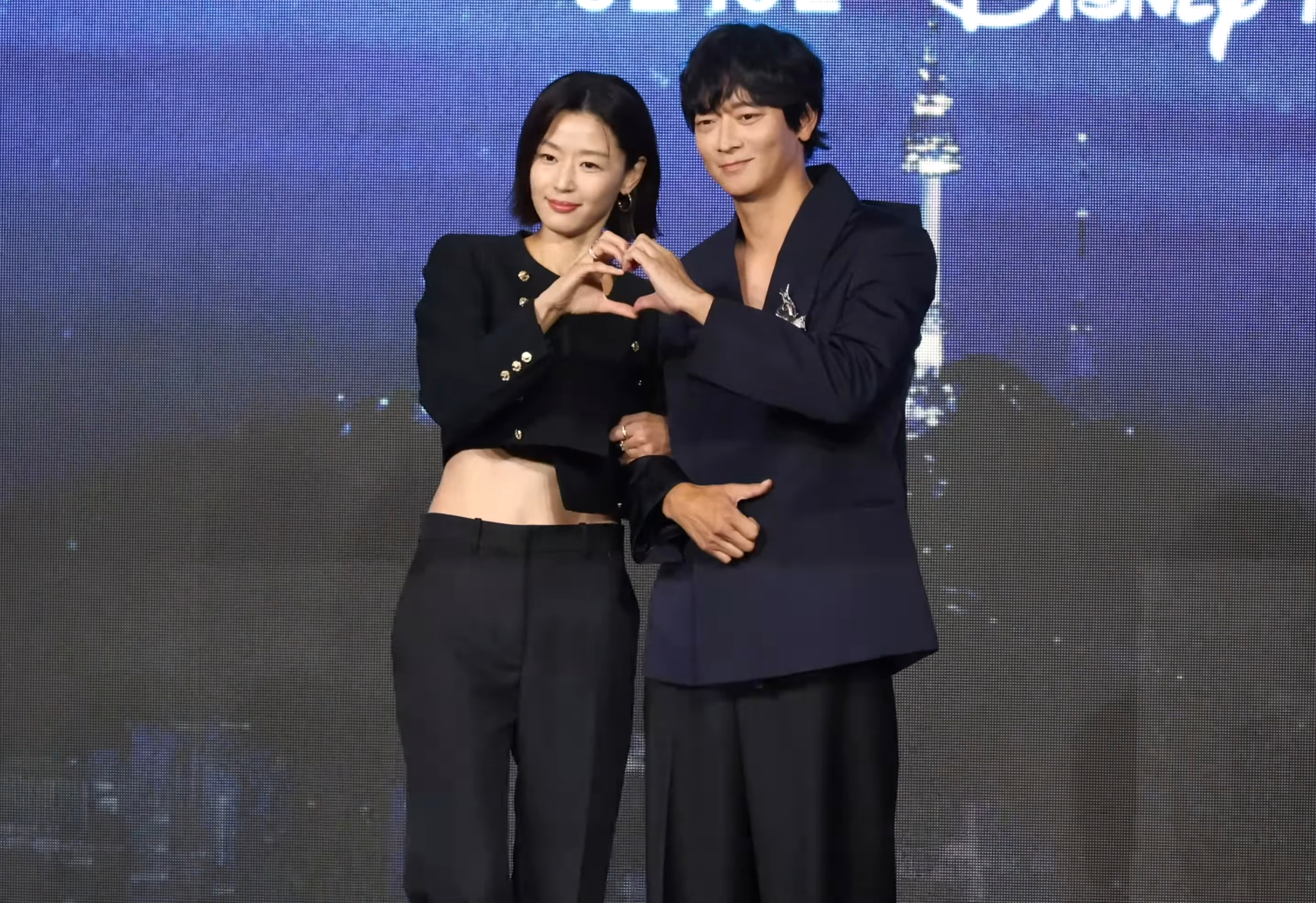
Tempest production presentation on September 2, 2025

It was released on Disney+ internationally and Hulu and Hulu on Disney Plus (with bundle) in the U.S. The first three episodes released on September 10, 2025. The remaining episodes were released, with two episodes each week, for a total of 9 episodes.

== Reception ==
=== Critical response ===
On the review aggregator website Rotten Tomatoes, 100% of 7 critics' reviews are positive, with an average rating of 8.30/10. Mike Hale from The New York Times mentioned the addition of American actors was "an improvement over the expats normally hired to play English-language roles in Asian films and series." Regarding the "soap operas at heart" aspect of Korean dramas, he stated, "the confusions of the plot and the tinniness of the dialogue are more noticeable than usual." However, Hale remarked that "the stars are attractive...the hand-to-hand combat is well choreographed and by the third episode the story starts to gain some of the juice and propulsion that we come to South Korean thrillers for." Screen Rant said, "While there are audience members unhappy with its portrayal of international countries, the show's success is still readily evident in its global popularity and highly positive reception from critics....its streaming performance indicates many don't share the same opinions."

=== Controversy ===
Although Tempest is officially unavailable in China, it sparked backlash among Chinese social media users, fueled by the circulation of decontextualized clips of the series. In a scene from an episode, Jun's character asks, "Why does China prefer war?" which many took to be a portrayal of China as belligerent. The depiction of the Chinese city of Dalian was criticized as presenting it as dilapidated and outdated, with scenes purportedly set there filmed instead in Hong Kong's shanty area. Another point of contention involved a red carpet with yellow five-pointed stars set in the White House Cabinet Room. Some viewers interpreted this as a symbolic trampling of China's national flag, although the carpet was an accurate reproduction of the Cabinet Room carpet. Jun was ridiculed for her accented recitation of a Li Bai poem (Bring in the Wine (將進酒)) in Mandarin. Following the controversy, Louis Vuitton, La Mer and Piaget removed Jun's advertisements from their Weibo accounts. Jun's agency stated the actress's brand campaigns were "unrelated" to Tempest and had ended before the show's release. The series also received backlash in Iraq over its portrayal of the country as an "uncivilized terrorist state" and "the most dangerous place in the world," as well as in Vietnam over its claim that South Korean soldiers were Vietnam War heroes.

In response to these controversies, TV drama critic and Professor Yoon Seok-jin of the Korean Language and Literature Department at Chungnam National University commented, "Dramas released on global OTT platforms like Disney+ are aimed at viewers around the world, so the description or expression of a specific country needs to be somewhat cautious. However, it is a natural context that various countries and past cases are mentioned in the process of dealing with the situation of the Korean Peninsula and the complex international relations of Northeast Asia. Even if a problem is raised, it is necessary to evaluate it in the overall narrative of the work. Since Seo Mun-ju is set as a former ambassador to the United Nations and a presidential candidate, and the stories of the great powers surrounding the Korean Peninsula are included, the comments on the international situation can come out in the situation of the characters in the play, so it is excessive to evaluate it only with fragmentary lines."
