= Triple (TV series) =

- Promotional poster
- Genre: Romance; Drama
- Written by: Lee Jung-ah; Oh Su-jin
- Directed by: Lee Yoon-jung
- Starring: Lee Jung-jae; Lee Sun-kyun; Yoon Kye-sang; Lee Ha-na; Min Hyo-rin
- Country of origin: South Korea
- Original language: Korean
- No. of episodes: 16

Production
- Running time: 60 minutes

Original release
- Network: Munhwa Broadcasting Corporation
- Release: June 11 – July 30, 2009

Triple (Korean: 트리플) is a 2009 South Korean television series starring Lee Jung-jae, Lee Sun-kyun, Yoon Kye-sang, Lee Ha-na, and Min Hyo-rin. It aired on MBC from June 11 to July 30, 2009 on Wednesdays and Thursdays at 21:55 for 16 episodes.

== Plot ==
Eighteen-year-old aspiring figure skater Lee Ha-ru (Min Hyo-rin) moves to Seoul to pursue her ice dreams. In the city she reunites with her stepbrother Shin Hwal (Lee Jung-jae), whom she hasn't seen in years. Her divorcee mother had remarried Hwal's father when Ha-ru was 6, but their parents died in a car accident when she was 13. Ha-ru was sent to live with her real father (Choi Baek-ho) in the countryside and had since lost touch with Hwal.

Hwal, now in his mid-thirties, works at an advertising agency with his two best friends and roommates, Kang Hyun-tae (Yoon Kye-sang) and Jo Hae-yoon (Lee Sun-kyun). When Ha-ru suddenly shows up at the doorstep of their bachelor pad, she ends up moving in with the three men.

Ha-ru's new figure skating coach, Choi Soo-in (Lee Ha-na) turns out to be Hwal's estranged wife. Her plans to make amends with her ex-husband are derailed when his outgoing friend Hyun-tae falls for her instantly and begins pursuing her.

Hae-yoon and bartender Kang Sang-hee (Kim Hee) are longtime friends. When a one-night stand leads to something more, the more old-fashioned Hae-yoon has difficulty dealing with Sang-hee's commitment issues.

Meanwhile, Ha-ru feels torn between Ji Poong-ho (Song Joong-ki), a short track speed skating national athlete her own age, and her growing romantic feelings for her much older stepbrother Hwal.

== Cast ==
- Lee Jung-jae as Shin Hwal
- Lee Sun-kyun as Jo Hae-yoon
- Yoon Kye-sang as Kang Hyun-tae
- Lee Ha-na as Choi Soo-in
- Min Hyo-rin as Lee Ha-ru
- Kim Hee as Kang Sang-hee
- Choi Baek-ho as Haru's father
- Song Joong-ki as Ji Poong-ho
- Kim Sang-ho as Coach Nam
- Choi Sun-young as Yoon Hye-jin
- Kim Hye-jung as Soo-in's mother
- Jung Ji-soon as U Communications department head Han
- Kim Young-kwang as Jae-wook
- Jung Byung-chul as company executive
- Ryu Sung-hoon as gangster
- Kwon Beom-jin as young Jo Hae-yoon
- Lee Sung-min as Director Jung
- Kang Ji-hoo
- Kim Bo-ri
- Kim Byung-choon
- Park So-hyun as Coach Shin (cameo)
- Kim Chang-wan as Kim Bok-man (cameo)

== International broadcast ==
- It aired in Vietnam on HTV7 in March 2010.
- It aired in Indonesia on B-Channel in April 2013.
