= Sanulrim =

South Korean rock band

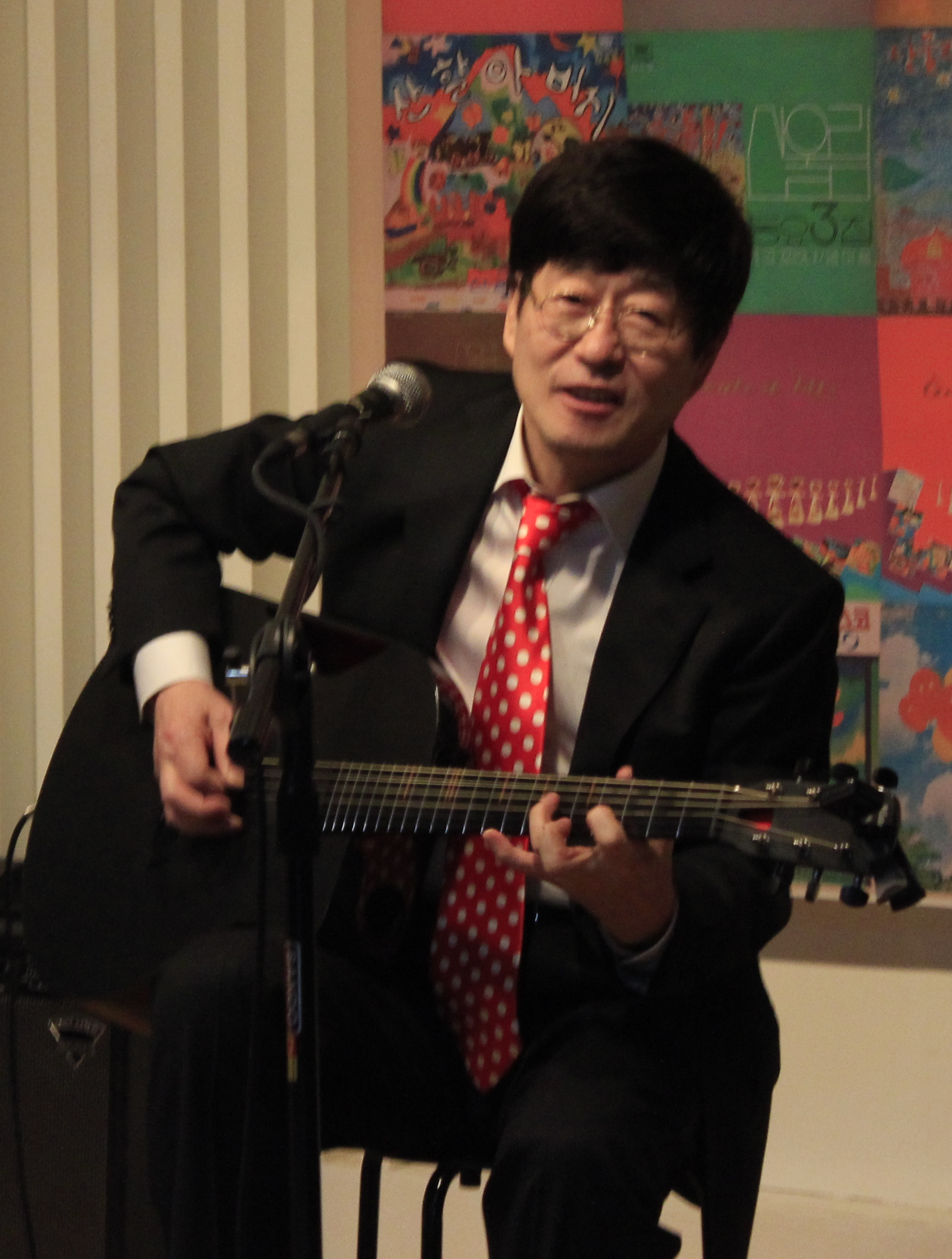
- Kim Chang-wan in 2016, his mini concert

Background information
- Origin: South Korea
- Genres: Psychedelic rock, folk rock, punk rock, new wave, pop rock
- Years active: 1977–2008
- Past members: Kim Chang-wan (김창완); Kim Chang-hoon (김창훈); Kim Chang-ik (김창익)

Sanulrim (Hangul: 산울림), also spelled Sanullim, was a South Korean rock band that debuted in 1977. They are considered to be one of South Korea's most influential rock groups. The band consisted of brothers Kim Chang-wan, Kim Chang-hoon, and Kim Chang-ik.

== History ==
The three members of Sanulrim are brothers. They were Kim Chang-wan (김창완, 1954–), Kim Chang-hoon (김창훈, 1956–), Kim Chang-ik (김창익, 1958–2008).

The band, formed when the three were university students, was initially called 무이 (Mui) and was never meant to be professional. Kim Chang-hoon's other college band, named "Sand Pebbles," won the MBC College K-pop Festival with their song, "나 어떡해 (What Shall I Do)". Mui was initially nominated to win with their song, "문좀 열어줘 (Please Open the Door)" but was not qualified because Kim Chang-wan had already graduated from the university.

Gaining confidence, the band looked for a music agency and changed the name of the band into 'Sanulrim' by their new manager's demand.

The band released their first album in December 1977. The album largely impacted the Korean music scene and became both critically and commercially successful. The album, entitled vol.1 아니벌써 (vol.1 What, Already?) brought new type of music which Koreans had never heard before. People were absorbed with the psychedelic/hard rock sound the band produced. Sanulrim's appearance in the music scene was also dramatic and significant because they vitalized the Korean music scene, which was currently devastated after several major musicians were arrested for marijuana possession around the middle of 1970's.

During 1977-1984, they released 10 or more albums and helped other musicians. With the K-pop retrospective boom during the 1990s, all of their albums were reissued and a tribute album was released. Sanulrim performed in Seoul on July 5, 2007 and July 6, 2007 for their 30th anniversary and planned to release a vol. 14 album within the same year.

On January 29, 2008, drummer Kim Chang-ik was killed in a traffic accident while driving a forklift during heavy snow in Vancouver, British Columbia, Canada. Kim Chang-wan announced the end of the band after his brother's death.

After the breakup, Kim Chang-wan has been actively performing as a musician, actor, writer and broadcast celebrity. He was one of the antagonists in the hit South Korean medical drama White Tower, and had a supporting role in the romantic comedy Coffee Prince. Kim Chang-hoon resides in Los Angeles with his family.

== Discography ==
=== Studio albums ===
Title	Released
Volume 1: Already Now (아니 벌써)	December 15, 1977
Volume 2: Spread Silk on My Heart (내 마음에 주단을 깔고)	May 10, 1978
Volume 3: My Heart (내 마음)	November 1, 1978
Volume 4: Express Train (특급열차)	April 15, 1979
Volume 5: Daytime Hourglass (한낮의 모래시계)	September 20, 1979
Volume 6: Wait A Little Longer (조금만 기다려요)	May 5, 1980
Volume 7: Don’t Go (가지마오)	August 1, 1981
Volume 8: Flying Bird (새야 날아)	March 25, 1982
Volume 9: Want To Keep It as a Smiling Memory (웃는 모습으로 간직하고 싶어)	January 10, 1983
Volume 10: The Meaning of You (너의 의미)	July 20, 1984
Volume 11: Will It Rain the Day You Leave? (그대 떠나는 날 비가 오는가?)	September 10, 1986
Volume 12: Dreaming Park (꿈꾸는 공원)	July 1, 1991
Volume 13: Rainbow (무지개)	January 1997

== Awards ==
=== Korean Music Awards ===
Year	Category	Recipient	Ref
2009	Achievement Award	Sanulrim	

== See also ==
- Kim Chang-wan
