= Choi Ji-woo =

South Korean actress (born 1975)

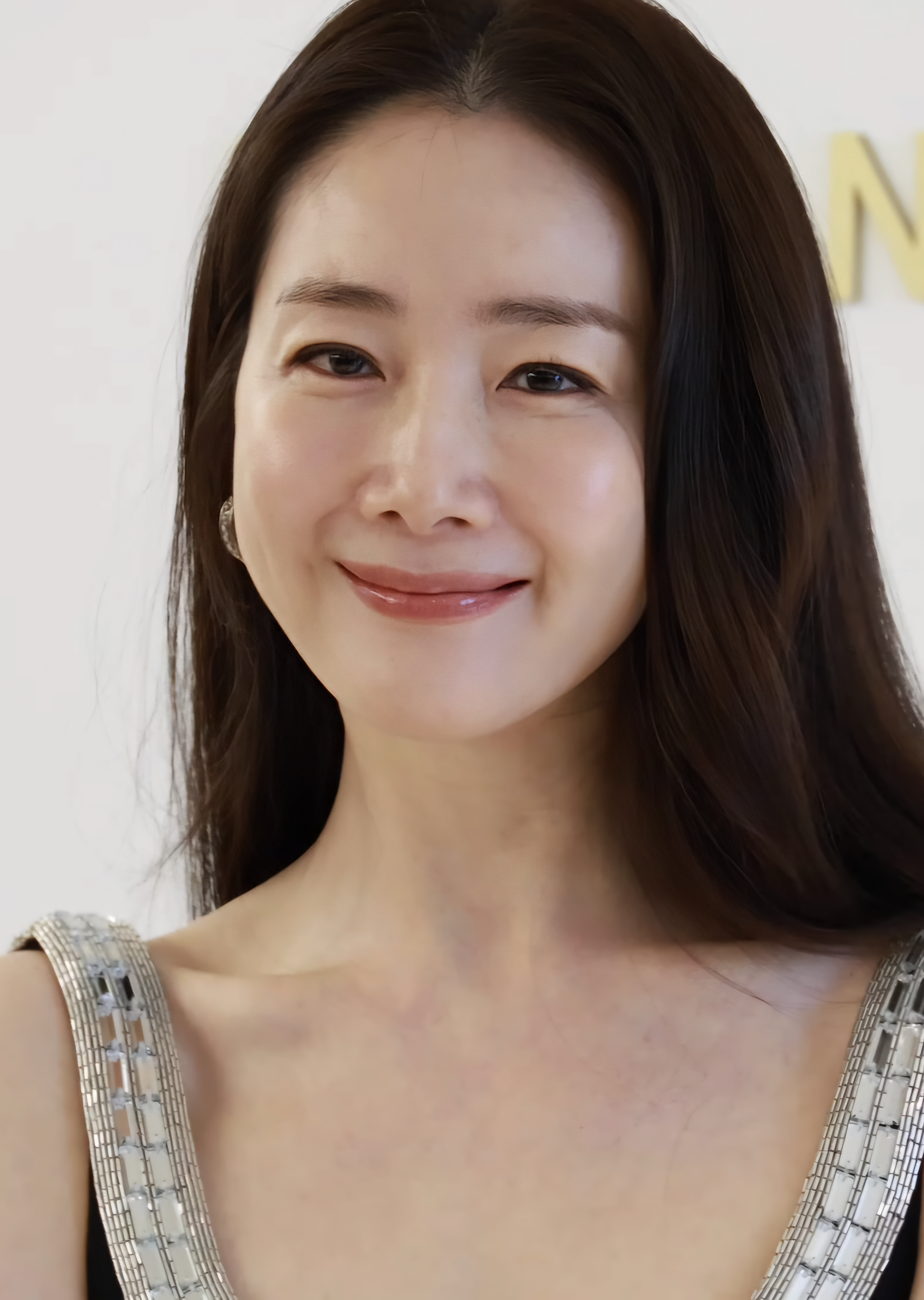
- Choi in April 2024
- Born: Choi Mi-hyang; June 11, 1975 (age 51); Paju, South Korea
- Education: Busan Sooyoung Elementary; Dukmoon Girl's High School; Busan Women's College - Aerobic Dance
- Occupation: Actress
- Years active: 1994–present
- Agent: Studio Santa Claus Entertainment
- Spouse: Unknown (m. 2018)
- Children: 1

Korean name
- Hangul: 최미향
- Hanja: 崔美香
- RR: Choe Mihyang
- MR: Ch'oe Mihyang

Stage name
- Hangul: 최지우
- Hanja: 崔志宇
- RR: Choe Jiu
- MR: Ch'oe Chiu

Choi Ji-woo (Korean: 최지우; born June 11, 1975), born Choi Mi-hyang (최미향), is a South Korean actress. Considered one of South Korea's most beautiful women, she has received critical acclaim for her work in a wide range of melodramas, most notably Beautiful Days (2001), Winter Sonata (2002), Stairway to Heaven (2003), Air City (2007), Star's Lover (2008), The Suspicious Housekeeper (2013), and Temptation (2014), as well as the romantic comedy series Twenty Again (2015) and Woman with a Suitcase (2016).

== Career ==
=== 1994–1998: Beginnings ===
Choi Mi-hyang was first discovered when she won a talent audition organized by MBC in 1994, then made her acting debut in the drama series War and Love in 1995. Afterwards, she adopted the stage name Choi Ji-woo.

She was cast in her first major role in 1996 film The Gate of Destiny, but her limited acting skills resulted in her being replaced during filming. In the next couple of years Choi continued to star in both TV dramas and films, including The Hole (the Original version of Hollywood thriller Hush), as well as the romantic comedies First Kiss with Ahn Jae-wook and The Romantic President with Ahn Sung-ki. It was her portrayals on TV of tragic heroines with a pure and innocent image—notably in Truth opposite Ryu Si-won and Beautiful Days opposite Lee Byung-hun—that boosted her rising popularity.

In 2002, she reunited onscreen with Bae Yong-joon (she previously had a supporting role in his 1996 drama First Love) that she would star in her most famous, iconic role. Directed by Yoon Seok-ho as the second installment of his "season dramas," Winter Sonata became a phenomenal hit throughout Asia and has been credited as one of the initiators of the Korean Wave. As a result, Choi gained wide pan-Asian recognition, especially a huge following in Japan where she acquired the nickname Ji-woo Hime ("Princess Ji-woo"). In 2009 she and Bae reprised their roles as voice actors for Winter Sonata Anime. She continues to be a lucrative star and brand in Japan, fetching high licensing/broadcasting rights for her dramas and selling out concerts and merchandise (tvN's E News compiled a list of the top Hallyu stars in Japan based on their approximate gross incomes for the first half of 2011, and Choi was number five with approximately US$2 million).

After the success of her 2003 melodrama Stairway to Heaven with Kwon Sang-woo, Choi again attempted to break into film. She played a terminally ill heroine in Now and Forever, and a more risque character in sex comedy Everybody Has Secrets ("The Original Version of Irish film About Adam"). Both films were poorly received by critics and audiences in South Korea, but performed well at the Japanese box office.

Choi then spent the next few years overseas, shooting the Chinese drama 101st Proposal with Sun Xing, and the Japanese drama RONDO opposite Yutaka Takenouchi. She returned to Korean television in 2007 in Air City alongside Lee Jung-jae; her role was the Chief Operating Officer of Incheon Airport.

=== 2009–2012: Breakthrough ===
In 2009, she starred opposite Yoo Ji-tae in the drama Star's Lover, playing a top actress who falls in love with an ordinary man. Choi received ₩48 million per episode, the highest salary for a Korean actress at the time (her record was later broken by Go Hyun-jung's ₩55 million for the 2010 drama Daemul).

That same year, she set up her own management agency called C,JW Company with her brother as CEO. She also joined the ensemble cast of semi-improvisational mockumentary Actresses, arguably her most significant film yet.

During the press conference for the 2011 series, Can't Lose, co-starring Yoon Sang-hyun, featuring a lawyer couple facing their own divorce suit, she was asked if she worried about shedding her pure and innocent image. Choi said, "I've had the same image for 15 years. Isn't it time for me to break out? I was a melodrama queen and now I want the title of romantic comedy queen." She added that she had gained more fans after showing her cheerful, easygoing side as a guest on the reality show 2 Days & 1 Night.

In 2012, Choi was cast in the Chinese drama City Lovers, in which she portrayed the CEO at an event management company opposite Qin Hao, a newly employed businessman at her firm.

Later that year, she became the host of Choi Ji-woo's Delicious Korea on food lifestyle cable channel O'live TV alongside fashion designer Jung Kuho. The 5-episode show, which aired from November 23 to December 21, 2012, aimed to promote Korean cuisine and culture to the world, and the two hosts traveled through South Korea and introduced little-known regional food to the viewers.

She next headlined the 2013 remake of the hit 2011 Japanese drama Kaseifu no Mita. In The Suspicious Housekeeper, Choi played the titular character, an icy and stoic yet amazingly capable housekeeper who comes to work for a recently widowed father and his four children. Despite the difficulty of not being able to react to her costars, Choi said she chose the role because she "was really charmed by the way the heroine refrains from letting her emotions show."

=== 2014–present: Career resurgence ===
In February 2014, Choi signed with the talent agency YG Entertainment. She then reunited with previous costar Kwon Sang-woo in Temptation; she played a rich woman who makes a dangerous offer to a married man.

Choi joined the fourth season of travel-reality show Grandpas Over Flowers in 2015, where she and Lee Seo-jin backpacked through Greece with veteran actors Lee Soon-jae, Shin Goo, Park Geun-hyung and Baek Il-seob. This was followed by the cable series Twenty Again, where she gained critical acclaim as a shy 38-year-old housewife who decides to experience campus college life for the first time alongside her 20-year-old son.

In 2016, Choi returned to the big screen in seven years, starring in the ensemble cast romance film Like for Likes. The same year, she starred in the legal romance drama Woman with a Suitcase.

In 2017, Choi was cast in the family melodrama The Most Beautiful Goodbye, a remake of the drama The Most Beautiful Goodbye in the World by Noh Hee-kyung.

In 2019, Choi made a cameo appearance as herself in episode 13 of the tvN drama, Crash Landing on You.

== Personal life ==
Choi majored in aerobic dance at Busan Women's College. She later enrolled in Hanyang University's Department of Theater and Film and completed her first year; however she had to withdraw from college studies due to her hectic work schedule.

Choi married her non-celebrity boyfriend who is 9 years her junior, on March 29, 2018, in a private wedding, only publicly announcing it just hours prior through a handwritten letter released in her fan club website. Choi announced that she was pregnant with her first child on December 23, 2019, and gave birth to a daughter on May 16, 2020.

== Filmography ==
=== Film ===
Year	Title	Role	Notes	Ref.
1996	The Adventures of Mrs Park	Eun-jin		
1997	Hallelujah	Bar madam	Bit part	
1997	The Hole	Su-jin		
1998	Alien	Kim's daughter	Voice	
1998	First Kiss	Song Yeon-hwa		
1999	Nowhere to Hide	Kim Ju-yeon		
2002	The Romantic President	Choi Eun-soo		
2004	Everybody Has Secrets	Han Sun-young		
2005	Shadowless Sword	Female martial arts gosu	Cameo	
2006	Now and Forever	Han Hye-won		
2009	Actresses	Herself		
2016	Like for Likes	Ham Joo-ran		
2023	New Normal	Hyeon-jeong		
2025	Hitman 2	Doctor	Cameo	
2026	Sugar	Mi-ra	Independent film	

=== Television series ===
Year	Title	Role	Notes	Ref.
1995	War and Love			
1996	MBC Best Theater: "Love, Just That One Thing"			
1996	First Love	Kang Seok-hee		
1996	Three Guys and Three Girls		Cameo appearance	
1997	Happiness Is in Our Hearts	Seon Kyung-ah		
1998	Love	Yoo Ji-young		
1999	Love in 3 Colors	Eun Ji-soo		
1999	Love Story	Min-jung	Episode 3–4	
2000	Truth	Lee Ja-young		
2000	Mr. Duke	Jang Soo-jin		
2001	Beautiful Days	Kim Yeon-soo		
2002	We Are Dating Now		Cameo; episode 15	
2002	Winter Sonata	Jeong Yoo-jin		
2003	Stairway to Heaven	Han Jung-seo		
2004	Full House	Herself	Cameo; episode 3	
2004	101st Proposal	Li Shao Rong	Chinese drama	
2006	Rondo	Choi Yoon-ah	Japanese drama	
2007	Air City	Han Do-kyung		
2008	Star's Lover	Lee Ma-ri		
2009	Winter Sonata Anime	Jeong Yoo-jin	Voice	
2011	Fuyu no Sakura	Inaba Tatsuki's Korean girlfriend	Cameo; episode 2	
2011	Can't Lose	Lee Eun-jae		
2013	The Suspicious Housekeeper	Park Bok-nyeo		
2014	Temptation	Yoo Se-young		
2015	Second 20s	Ha No-ra		
2016	Woman with a Suitcase	Cha Geum-joo		
2017	The Most Beautiful Goodbye	Yeon-soo		
2020	Crash Landing on You	Herself	Cameo; episode 13, 15	
2022	Shooting Stars	Eun Si-woo	Cameo	
2024	Black Pean Season 2	Park Seo-hyun	Japanese drama	

=== Web series ===
Year	Title	Role	Notes	Ref.
2015	We Broke Up	Herself	Cameo; episode 3	
2016	7 First Kisses	Goddess	Episode 1, 7	

=== Television shows ===
Year	Title	Role	Notes	Ref.
2008	Line to the Law Center		VTR appearance	
2012	Choi Ji-woo's Delicious Korea	Host		
2013	MBC Human Documentary - Love	Narration		
2015	Grandpas Over Flowers	Cast member	Season 4	
2017	Candy in my Ears – Season 2	Cast member		
2019	Coffee Friends	Cast member		
2021	Bistro Shigor	Restaurant president		
2024–present	The Return of Superman	Host	with Ahn Young-mi	

=== Music video appearances ===
Year	Title	Artist	Ref.
1996	"Endless Love" (무한지애)	Kim Jung-min	
1998	"Scenery" (풍경)	Goo Bon-seung and Jang Dong-gun	
1998	"Na Na Na"	Yoo Seung-jun	
1999	"For Your Soul"	Jo Sung-mo	
2003	"The Young Prince's Dream" (별을 사랑한 어린 왕자의 꿈)	Cha Tae-hyun	
2013	"Ziugae" (지우개)	ALi	

== Accolades ==
=== Awards and nominations ===
Name of the award ceremony, year presented, category, nominee of the award, and the result of the nomination
Award ceremony	Year	Category	Nominee / Work	Result	Ref.
Andre Kim Best Star Awards	2003	Female Star Award	Choi Ji-woo	Won	
Asia Model Awards	2012	Asia Star Award	Choi Ji-woo	Won	
Baeksang Arts Awards	1998	Best New Actress – Film	The Hole	Won	
Baeksang Arts Awards	2002	Most Popular Actress – Television	Winter Sonata	Won	
Baeksang Arts Awards	2004	Most Popular Actress – Television	Stairway to Heaven	Won	
Baeksang Arts Awards	2005	Hallyu Special Award	Choi Ji-woo	Won	
Blue Dragon Film Awards	1997	Best New Actress	The Hole	Nominated	
Blue Dragon Film Awards	1999	Best Supporting Actress	Nowhere to Hide	Nominated	
Dior Timeless Beauty Awards	2006	—N/a	Choi Ji-woo	Won	
Golden Cinematography Awards	1998	Best New Actress	The Hole	Won	
Golden Cinematography Awards	2003	Most Popular Actress	The Romantic President	Won	
Golden Disc Awards	1999	Golden Video Best Actress	"For Your Soul"	Won	
Grand Bell Awards	2000	Best Supporting Actress	Nowhere to Hide	Nominated	
International Cultural Industry Exchange Foundation Awards	2009	—N/a	Choi Ji-woo	Won	
KBS Drama Awards	1996	Best New Actress	First Love	Nominated	
KBS Drama Awards	2002	Popularity Award	Winter Sonata	Won	
KBS Drama Awards	2002	Top Excellence Award, Actress	Winter Sonata	Won	
Korea Drama Awards	2014	Top Excellence Award, Actress	The Suspicious Housekeeper	Nominated	
Korea's Isabelle Adjani Contest	1995	—N/a	Choi Ji-woo	Won	
MBC Drama Awards	2000	Excellence Award, Actress	Mr. Duke / Truth	Won	
MBC Drama Awards	2016	Top Excellence Award, Actress in a Special Project Drama	Woman with a Suitcase	Nominated	
Model Line Best Dresser Awards	2002	Swan Award	Choi Ji-woo	Won	
SBS Drama Awards	2001	Excellence Award, Actress	Beautiful Days	Won	
SBS Drama Awards	2001	Top 10 Stars	Beautiful Days	Won	
SBS Drama Awards	2003	Excellence Award, Actress in a Drama Special	Stairway to Heaven	Won	
SBS Drama Awards	2003	Top 10 Stars	Stairway to Heaven	Won	
SBS Drama Awards	2009	Excellence Award, Actress in a Drama Special	Star's Lover	Nominated	
SBS Drama Awards	2013	Top Excellence Award, Actress in a Drama Special	The Suspicious Housekeeper	Nominated	
SBS Drama Awards	2014	Top Excellence Award, Actress in a Drama Special	Temptation	Nominated	
tvN10 Awards	2016	Best Actress	Second 20s	Nominated	
World Tourism Cities Forum	2010	Top Popularity Award	Choi Ji-woo	Won	

=== Honors ===
Name of country or organization, year given, and name of honor or award
Country or organization	Year	Honor / Award	Ref.
Journalists Association of Korea	2004	Proud Korean Award	
Korea Tourism Organization (Note: Honors are given at the annual Tourism Day Celebration Ceremony.)	2009	Presidential Commendation	
Seoul City Committee	2012	Social Welfare Award (Note: Presented at the Seoul International Social Work Conference.)	
Seoul International Drama Awards	2009	Star Hall of Fame	
The Motion Pictures Association of Korea	2005	Hallyu Special Award	
