= Beating Heart (TV series) =

- DVD cover
- Also known as: Six Love Stories; My Trembling Heart
- Starring: Bae Doona; Bae Jong-ok; Kim Chang-wan; Go Ah-sung
- Country of origin: South Korea
- Original language: Korean
- No. of episodes: 12

Production
- Running time: 50 minutes

Original release
- Network: Munhwa Broadcasting Corporation
- Release: April 2 – May 8, 2005

Beating Heart (Korean: 떨리는 가슴; RR: Tteollineun gaseum; also known as Six Love Stories) is a South Korean television drama series, produced by MBC and broadcast in 2005. The series consists of six two-part stories, with each story having its own team of writer and director. It focuses on the lives of a typical Korean family, examining the relationships between the four main characters, their romantic interests, and other family members, while answering the question "When did you feel your heart beating the hardest?"

In 2006, the series was broadcast by the KBFD network in Hawaii as My Trembling Heart. It has also been released on DVD in South Korea and Japan.

== Cast ==
=== Main characters ===
- Bae Doona as Bae Doona
- Bae Jong-ok as Bae Jong-ok
- Kim Chang-wan as Kim Chang-wan
- Go Ah-sung as Kim Bo-mi

=== Supporting characters ===
- Kim Dong-wan as Kang Sung-jae (episodes 1-2)
- Shin Sung-woo as Jung Nam-soo (episodes 1-4)
- Harisu as Kim Chang-ho/Kim Hae-jung (episodes 3–4, 9 & 12)
- Kim Hak-joon as Chan (episodes 5-6)
- Yoo Hye-jung as Chan's mother (episodes 5-6)
- Choi Kang-hee as Oh Soo-kyung (episodes 7-8)
- Choi Jung-won as Jung-hyun (episodes 7-8)
- Ji Sung as Kim Woo-jin/Seok-jin (episodes 9-10)
- Kim Soo-mi as Mae-shim (episodes 11-12)
- Baek Il-seob as Mae-shim's partner (episodes 11-12)
- Choi Soo-han

== Staff ==
=== Directors ===
- Oh Kyung-hoon (episodes 1-2)
- Ko Dong-seon (episodes 3-4)
- Shin Hyung-chang (episodes 5-6)
- Lee Yoon-jung (episodes 7-8)
- Kim Jin-man (episodes 9-10)
- Park Sung-soo (episodes 11-12)

=== Writers ===
- Kim In-young (episodes 1-2)
- Jung Hyung-soo (episodes 3-4)
- Park Jung-hwan (episodes 5-6)
- Hong Jin-ah (episodes 7-8)
- Lee Kyung-hee (episodes 9-10)
- In Jung-ok (episodes 11-12)

== Airdates ==
Episode #	Title	South Korea (MBC)	Hawaii, USA (KBFD)
1	Love	April 2, 2005	February 6, 2006
2	Love	April 3, 2005	February 7, 2006
3	Joy	April 9, 2005	February 13, 2006
4	Joy	April 10, 2005	February 14, 2006
5	Sorrow	April 16, 2005	February 20, 2006
6	Sorrow	April 17, 2005	February 21, 2006
7	Hope	April 23, 2005	February 27, 2006
8	Hope	April 24, 2005	February 28, 2006
9	Outing	April 30, 2005	March 6, 2006
10	Outing	May 1, 2005	March 7, 2006
11	Happiness	May 7, 2005	March 13, 2006
12	Happiness	May 8, 2005	March 14, 2006
