= Now and Forever (2006 film) =

Yeolliji
- Film poster
- Hangul: 연리지
- RR: Yeolliji
- MR: Yŏlliji
- Directed by: Kim Seong-jung
- Starring: Choi Ji-woo; Jo Han-sun
- Release date: 13 April 2006
- Country: South Korea
- Language: Korean
- Budget: $3,200,000
- Box office: $4,291,925

Now and Forever (Korean: 연리지; RR: Yeolliji) is a 2006 South Korean film directed by Kim Seong-jung and starring Choi Ji-woo, Jo Han-sun, Choi Sung-kook and Seo Young-hee. It also has a Japanese manga named RENRI NO EDA (連理の枝) Intertwined Branches.

== Plot summary ==
Min-su (played by Jo) is a playboy. With his attractive looks, money, and position as a CEO of a game company, he easily lures women he likes and simply enjoys casual relationships with them. His life, however, reaches a turning point when Hye-won (Choi) enters the scene.

At first, she is nothing more than one of many women he has met, but as he gets to know her, he realizes that he is in love —something he has never experienced before.

Although Hye-won has to spend most of her time in the hospital due to a fatal disease, she is always cheerful and not discouraged with her misfortune and tries to enjoy life. Mysteriously, Hye-won does not give any signs that she is dying until their relationship is in full bloom. As the story progresses, Min-su learns about the true meaning of love and Hye-won has the best time of her life —thanks to him.

== Cast ==
- Choi Ji-woo as Han Hye-won
  - Jung Da-bin as young Hye-won
- Jo Han-sun as Min-su
- Choi Sung-kook
- Seo Young-hee
- Son Hyun-joo as Section chief Min
