= Mr. Duke =

- Promotional poster
- Genre: Romance; Comedy
- Written by: Kim Sun Young
- Directed by: Lee Joo Hwan
- Starring: Choi Ji-woo; Kim Seung-woo
- Country of origin: South Korea
- Original language: Korean
- No. of episodes: 16

Production
- Executive producer: Lee Chang-soon

Original release
- Network: Munhwa Broadcasting Corporation
- Release: July 12 – September 7, 2000

Mr. Duke is a 2000 South Korean television series by MBC about an heiress who hires a poor man to become her husband.

== Plot ==
Soo-jin Jang's rich and powerful father tricks her into returning to Korea so that she can marry and provide him with a successor to his business empire. Desperate to stop her father's madness, Soo-jin pretends she already has a boyfriend, and so enlists the help of simple water deliveryman, Kim Yong-nam (Kim Seung-woo). She must pass Yong-nam off as a member of high society if she is to stop her father's plans.

== Cast ==
- Kim Seung-woo as Kim Yong-nam
- Choi Ji-woo as Jang Soo-jin
- Myung Kye-nam as Myung Gi-nam
- Kim Byung-se as Kang Sung-il
- Choi Jung-yoon as Joo Eun-ha
- Lee Soon-jae as President Jang
- Hong Kyung-in as Baek Kwang-soo
- Lee Kye-in as Department head Jo
- Park Yeong-gyu as Jang Soo-chul
- Choi Ran as Park Ae-ja
- Na Moon-hee
- Kim Chang-wan
- Kim Dong-hyun as a pizza delivery guy

== See also ==
- List of Korean television shows
- Contemporary culture of South Korea
