= Tantara (TV series) =

Upcoming South Korean television series

- Teaser poster
- Hangul: 천천히 강렬하게
- Lit.: Slowly, Intensely
- RR: Cheoncheonhi gangnyeolhage
- MR: Ch'ŏnch'ŏnhi kangnyŏrhage
- Genre: Period drama
- Written by: Noh Hee-kyung
- Directed by: Lee Yoon-jung
- Starring: Song Hye-kyo; Gong Yoo; Kim Seol-hyun; Cha Seung-won; Lee Hanee
- Country of origin: South Korea
- Original language: Korean

Production
- Production companies: Studio Dragon; GTist; Imaginus

Original release
- Network: Netflix

Tantara (Korean: 천천히 강렬하게) is an upcoming South Korean period drama television series written by Noh Hee-kyung, directed by Lee Yoon-jung, and starring Song Hye-kyo, Gong Yoo, Kim Seol-hyun, Cha Seung-won, and Lee Hanee. The series follows a group of ambitious individuals striving for success in a competitive and often unforgiving entertainment landscape of South Korean music industry between the 1960s and 1980s. It is scheduled to be released on Netflix on December 11, 2026.

== Synopsis ==
Set in the South Korean entertainment industry between the 1960s and 1980s, the story follows Min-ja, a woman who pursues a music career following an impoverished upbringing. She is accompanied by her childhood friend Dong-gu, who enters the industry alongside her as they navigate the professional shifts of the era. Their careers involve interactions with Gil-yeo, a composer known for developing successful acts, and Min-hui, a childhood acquaintance who pursues an independent path in the industry. The narrative also includes Min-hui's mother, Yang-ja, who attempts to become a singer while managing the financial and social constraints of the period.

== Cast and characters ==
- Song Hye-kyo as Min-ja

A resilient woman who endured numerous hardships during childhood. Having struggled to make a living, she takes a bold step into the South Korean music industry in pursuit of new opportunities.

- Gong Yoo as Dong-gu

Min-ja's childhood friend, who helps support her dreams. He later enters the music industry alongside her.

- Kim Seol-hyun as Min-hui

A woman whose relationship with Min-ja has been marked by both affection and resentment from childhood.

- Cha Seung-won as Gil-yeo

A leading composer of his time and an influential figure in the music industry.

- Lee Hanee as Yang-ja

Min-hui's mother and an aspiring singer who remains determined to pursue her dream despite financial hardship.

- Na Moon-hee as Mal-soon

== Episodes ==
No.	Title	Original release date
Part 1
1	TBA	December 11, 2026
2	TBA	December 11, 2026
3	TBA	December 11, 2026
4	TBA	December 11, 2026
5	TBA	December 11, 2026
6	TBA	December 11, 2026
7	TBA	December 11, 2026
8	TBA	December 11, 2026
Part 2
9	TBA	December 18, 2026
10	TBA	December 18, 2026
11	TBA	December 18, 2026
12	TBA	December 18, 2026
13	TBA	December 18, 2026
14	TBA	December 18, 2026
15	TBA	December 18, 2026
Part 3
16	TBA	December 25, 2026
17	TBA	December 25, 2026
18	TBA	December 25, 2026
19	TBA	December 25, 2026
20	TBA	December 25, 2026
21	TBA	December 25, 2026
22	TBA	December 25, 2026

== Production ==
=== Development ===
In April 2024, reports emerged of a period drama tentatively titled Slowly but Intensely, written by Noh Hee-kyung, directed by Lee Yoon-jung, and produced by Studio Dragon, GTist and Imaginus. In addition, a media outlet reported that the drama was planned as a 20-to-24-episode with an estimated total production budget of approximately ₩80 billion, with per-episode costs projected at over ₩3 billion. In response, Studio Dragon stated that while the project was in development, the specific budget, episode count, and casting had not been finalized.

In February 2025, Netflix officially commissioned the series under the working title Show Business.

=== Casting ===
Song Hye-kyo and Gong Yoo was cast to lead the series. This project marks the third collaboration between Song and Noh, who previously worked together on Worlds Within (2008) and That Winter, the Wind Blows (2013), and a reunion for Gong and Lee after their work on the 2007 MBC drama Coffee Prince. Song and Gong along with Kim Seol-hyun, Cha Seung-won, and Lee Hanee were confirmed to play various roles.

=== Filming ===
Principal photography began on January 12, 2025 and concluded on January 10, 2026. Song Hye-kyo announced the wrap via her Instagram story with a caption: "Last day at work...".

== Release ==
Netflix confirmed that Tantara was scheduled to be released in the fourth quarter of 2026, later being confirmed to premiere on December 11.
