= Imaginus =

Drama Production company established in 2021

Imaginus, Inc.
- Logo
- Native name: 이매지너스
- Type: Private subsidiary
- Industry: Entertainment
- Founded: December 15, 2021; 4 years ago
- Founder: Choi Jin-hee
- Headquarters: 4F IMAGINUS 170, Noksapyeong-daero, Yongsan-gu, Seoul, South Korea
- Area served: Worldwide
- Key people: Choi Jin-hee(CEO); Ryu Hyung-jin (vice CEO); Kim Hyo-seong (CFO); Lee Hyun-jung (Chief Content Officer)
- Products: Korean dramas
- Services: Drama Production; Film Production
- Website: imaginus.co.kr

Imaginus (Korean: 이매지너스) is a South Korean drama and film production company. It was established in December 2021 by Choi Jin-hee, the former CEO of Studio Dragon. Headquartered in Seoul, Imaginus has quickly become a prominent player in the entertainment industry, attracting significant investments from companies like J&Private Equity (J&PE) and Contentree JoongAng. The company is a creator collective that operates with multiple subsidiary labels and has produced notable projects like Coupang Play original series Cinderella at 2 AM, Disney+ original series Tempest, and Netflix original series Can This Love Be Translated?.

== History ==
Imaginus was established on December 15, 2021, by Choi Jin-hee, former CEO of Studio Dragon, following her departure from her position in CJ ENM in November. Initially capitalized at ₩10 million, Imaginus attracted investment of ₩50 billion from J&Private Equity (J&PE) on December 8. According to an industry official, J&PE's investment in Imaginus was made at a corporate value of around ₩200 billion. It is said that the follow-up investment aims to increase the corporate value to ₩1 trillion.

In August 2022, Choi, representing Imaginus, was recognized as one of "Korea's 100 female startup leaders" by Hankyung Geeks and Startup Alliance. The selection was based on factors such as cumulative investment amount, experience, and industry. The list showcased the top female startup representatives in 10 different industries, including Education, Fashion & Beauty, E-commerce, Finance & Insurance, Healthcare, Living & Space, Food Tech, Content & Social, Leisure & Travel, and Advertising & Marketing. Choi ranked first in the Content & Social category and 9th overall.

Imaginus first work is Cinderella at 2 AM, a drama based on the web novel of the same name by Aigome. It depicts the love story of an ordinary woman who prioritizes protecting herself and a third-generation chaebol man who believes that protecting love is protecting himself. It was selected by KOCCA in April 2023 as one of the 27 projects to receive support from the '2023 Online Video Service (OTT) Specialized Content Production Support Project'. Studio Aljja was working on this project. The drama was written by Oh Eun-ji, co-directed by Seo Min-jung and Bae Hee-young, and starred Shin Hyun-been and Moon Sang-min. The series aired on Coupang Play from August 24 to September 22, 2024, every Saturday and Sunday at 21:00 (KST). It was also broadcast on Channel A on the same day and is available for streaming on Viu and Viki in selected regions.

In October, Imaginus was selected as one of 13 companies for KOCCA's Global Leap Support Project. They participated in MIPCOM, the world's largest broadcasting and video content market in Cannes, France from October 16 to 19, where the Ministry of Culture, Sports and Tourism and KOCCA set up the largest-ever Korean pavilion to promote K-content. According to KOCCA, the event attracted over 1,500 exhibitors and 3,500 buyers from 108 countries. The Korean pavilion generated export consultation amounts of USD 468.34 million (approximately around ₩633.7 billion) through 750 consultations over four days.

Imaginus has released several projects. Melodrama Tempest was produced by Showrunner and Studio AA. In March 2023, it was reported that director Kim Hee-won and writer Jeong Seo-kyeong, who previously collaborated on Little Woman, joined forces again for Tempest. It stars Jun Ji-hyun and Gang Dong-won. Trii Studio label produced romantic comedy Can This Love Be Translated? created by the writer team led by the Hong sisters at Studio Sot, and directed by Yoo Young-eun. It follows the relationship between Joo Ho-jin (Kim Seon-ho), a multilingual interpreter, and Cha Mu-hee (Go Youn-jung), a top actress.

Imaginus received the 10 Million Dollar Export Tower Award at the 61st Trade Day in December 2024.

Imaginus was one of eight companies that joined "Series on Board: Bangkok," which took place in Bangkok, Thailand from July 23 to 24. The event aimed to expand joint development and production in the Southeast Asian market. They networked with 36 major Thai broadcasting and online platforms. This event was part of the "Series on Board" events hosted by The Ministry of Culture, Sports, and Tourism and the Korea Creative Content Agency. It was previously held in Seoul, Tokyo, and Osaka.

In August 2025, it was reported that Imaginus has begun preparations for its initial public offering (IPO). According to industry sources, on September 3, Imaginus signed a lead underwriter contract with NH Investment & Securities last month at its headquarters.

== Related company ==
=== Subsidiaries (Labels) ===
==== Production Labels ====
In March 2024, Ryu Hyung-jin, the vice president of Imaginus, shared details about ten labels under Imaginus and their respective leaders in an exclusive interview with Cine21.

The labels included:

- Studio Sot (스튜디오 솥)

Writer's studio led by the Hong Sisters

- Showrunners (쇼러너스)

A content production house that includes directors Jang Young-woo, Kim Hee-won, Choi Jeong-gyu, Producer Song Kyung-hwa, and Producer Park Ju-yeon

- Alzza Studio (스튜디오 알짜)

Director Park Jun-hwa's production house specializing in romantic comedies.

- Studio AA (스튜디오 AA)

Co-led actor/producer Gang Dong-won and producer Lee Eun.

- Trii Studio (Korean: 트리 스튜디오)

Led by producer Kim Jin-yi, with director Lee Na-jeong and Lee Yoon-jung.

- H House (에이치 하우스)

A mystery genre production house led by director Kim Hong-seon, who is known for directing drama Warrior Baek Dong-soo, Pied Piper, Black, and Voice (Season 1).

- About Film (어바웃 필름)

The production company behind the film Extreme Job, led by Kim Seong-hwan.

- Studio PIC (Korean: 스튜디오 PIC)

Led by ex-SLL Chief Producer (CP) Jo Jun-hyung. Creators: Park Sang-eok, Im Byeong-eun

- Hips (힙즈)
- Sunny Park (써니파크)

A short dramas-specialized production house, led by Joo Sun.

==== Others ====
- Cafe The Brave (까페더브레이브)

A coffee shop based in Seoul's Itaewon area.

=== Joint venture ===
In the summer of 2023, Choi collaborated with Hwang Ji-young and Kim Hee-won to establish Studio Abit. Hwang Ji-young is a renowned entertainment show director, recognized for her work on MBC's I Live Alone from 2017 to 2021, which earned her accolades such as the 2018 Korean Broadcasting Awards Producer Award and the 2020 MBC Special Achievement Award. Her last MBC project was With the Silk of Dohpo Flying in Denmark. Hwang oversees the entertainment department at Studio Abit, while director Kim Hee-won, known for directing Little Women and Vincenzo, oversees the drama department.

Studio Abit was established as a joint venture between Imaginus and Innocean, an advertising production house affiliated with Hyundai Motor. The studio's primary focus is commercial content, including entertainment shows, dramas, and films. The signing ceremony for Studio Abit took place on August 7 at Innocean's Seoul headquarters, with key executives in attendance, including Innocean CEO Lee Yong-woo, Imaginus CEO Choi Jin-hee, and Studio Abit CEO Hwang Ji-young.

=== Shareholders ===
In December 2023, Imaginus attracted an investment of ₩50 billion from J&Private Equity (J&PE). At the time, J&PE's investment valued the company at approximately ₩200 billion. The 2024 audit report shows that Imaginus's largest shareholder is CEO Choi's private company, HEA Company (58.85%). J&PE also holds shares through two investment partnerships: the 'J&P 1st Private Equity Investment Partnership' (5.62%) and the 'NH-J&-IBKC Label New Technology Association' (13.11%).

In May 2025, Contentree JoongAng, a subsidiary of the JoongAng Group, reported its plan to acquire a 10.3% stake in Imaginus for ₩36.8 billion. This transaction, based on Imaginus's total of 2,673,622 issued shares, valued the company at approximately ₩360 billion. An industry official noted that Contentree JoongAng's entry as a new financial investor at the end of August 2025 is expected to slightly change the shareholding structure.

== Partnership ==
In 2023, Imaginus' Choi signed a strategic partnership with Myriagon Studio. Myriagon Studio, formerly known as Origamix Partners Inc, is a management company led by Shinsuke Sato, renowned for his original Netflix series Alice In Borderland. The rebranding took place following the acquisition of Origamix Partners Inc by Aniplex, a subsidiary of Sony Music Entertainment Japan. Starting from June 1, 2023, Choi appointed as Executive Advisor at Myriagon Studio in order to help establish a formidable Asian premium production network.

On March 21, 2024, Imaginus' Choi and Adam Burke, the director of the Los Angeles Tourism Office, signed a memorandum of understanding to collaborate on producing a Korean drama set in Los Angeles and promoting the city as a global tourism destination. This marked the first time a U.S. city tourism office has entered into an agreement for content production, and established a three-year partnership. In November 2024, Imaginus' Choi also signed a content joint development partnership with Japan's Asahi Broadcasting Corporation (ABC TV) to develop Japanese dramas combining Korean and Japanese production expertise.

In May 2025, Tsai Chia-chun, the director of the Taiwan Creative Content Agency, flew to Seoul and signed a memorandum of understanding with Imaginus' Choi. The agreement is for a two-year collaboration on a series co-development. The two parties will invite Taiwanese creators to partner with the Imaginus team to create three original streaming series. The series will focus on romance and be developed for the worldwide market.

== Production works ==
Key
†	Denotes films that have not yet been released

=== Imaginus ===
Drama credits of Imaginus and its subsidiaries
Year	Title		Network	Credited as			Ref.
Year	English	Korean	Network	Director	Screenwriter	Producer	Ref.
2024	Cinderella at 2 AM	새벽 두 시의 신데렐라	Coupang Play	Seo Min-jung; Bae Hee-young	Oh Eun-ji	Imaginus; Studio Aljja; Studio PIC	
2025	Tempest	북극성	Disney+	Kim Hee-won	Jeong Seo-kyeong	Imaginus; Showrunner; Studio AA	
2025	Typhoon Family	태풍상사	tvN	Lee Na-jeong; Kim Dong-hwi	Jang Hyun-sook	Studio Dragon; Imaginus; Studio Trii; Studio PIC	
2026	Can This Love Be Translated?	이 사랑 통역 되나요?	Netflix	Yoo Young-eun	Hong sisters Studio Sot	Imaginus; Trii Studio	
2026	The East Palace	동궁	Netflix	Choi Jeong-gyu	Kwon So-ra; Seo Jae-won	Imaginus; Showrunner	
2026	Tantara †	천천히 강렬하게	Netflix	Lee Yoon-jung	Noh Hee-kyung	Studio Dragon; GTist; Imaginus	
2027	Grand Galaxy Hotel †	그랜드 갤럭시 호텔	Netflix	Oh Chung-hwan	Hong sisters Studio Sot	Imaginus	
TBA	The Twilight Between Us †	혼	TBD	Kim Won-seok	Park Ji-eun	Studio Dragon; Culture Depot; Baram Pictures; Imaginus; Studio AA	

=== Subsidiaries Production Works ===
==== About Film ====
Production Works of About Film (Note: prior to joining Imaginus)
Year	Title		Credited as			Ref.
Year	English	Korean	Director	Screenwriter	Producer	Ref.
2019	Extreme Job	극한직업	Lee Byeong-heon	Bae Se-young	About Film; Haegrim Pictures	
2020	Secret Zoo	해치지않아	Son Jae-gon	Son Jae-gon; Lee Yong-jae; Kim Dae-woo	About Film; DCG Plus	
2021	What Happened to Mr. Cha?	차인표	Kim Dong-gyu	Kim Dong-gyu	About Film; Netflix	
2022	The Anchor	앵커	Jeong Ji-yeon		About Film; Insight Film	
2025	Sua's Home	캐리어를 끄는 소녀	Yun Sim-kyoung	Yun Sim-kyoung	About Film	
2026	Wild Sing	와일드 씽	Son Jae-gon	Son Jae-gon	About Film	
TBA	Hug Me †	안아줘	Kim Bo-ra	Kim Bo-ra	About Film	

==== H House ====
Drama credits of H House
Year	Title		Network	Credited as			Ref.
Year	English	Korean	Network	Director	Screenwriter	Producer	Ref.
2020	Tell Me What You Saw	본 대로 말하라	OCN	Kim Hong-seon	Ko Young-jae; Han Ki-hyun	H House	
2021	L.U.C.A.: The Beginning	루카: 더 비기닝	tvN	Kim Hong-seon	Cheon Seon-il	Take One Company; H House	
2023	Bait	미끼	Coupang Play	Kim Hong-seon	Kim Jin-wook	H House; Crehub; Studio Dragon	
2025	Dear Hongrang	탄금	Netflix	Kim Hong-seon	Kim Jin-ah (Note: adaptation of Tangeum: Swallowing Gold by Jang Da-hye)	Studio Dragon; Acemaker Movieworks; H House; EO Contents Group	
2026	Mousetrap †	들쥐	Netflix	Kim Hong-seon	Lee Jae-gon (Note: adaptation of Field Mouse by ludovico)	Kakao Entertainment; C-JeS Studios; H House; Studio PIM	

==== Showrunners ====
Drama credits of Showrunners
Year	Title		Network	Credited as			Ref.
Year	English	Korean	Network	Director	Screenwriter	Producer	Ref.
2024	Queen of Tears	눈물의 여왕	tvN	Jang Young-woo; Kim Hee-won	Park Ji-eun	Studio Dragon; Culture Depot; Showrunners	
2024	Love, Take Two	첫, 사랑을 위하여	tvN	Yoo Je-won; Ham Seung-hun	Sung Woo-jin	Studio Dragon; Showrunners	

==== Studio PIC ====
Drama credits of Studio PIC
Year	Title		Network	Credited as			Ref.
Year	English	Korean	Network	Director	Screenwriter	Producer	Ref.
2026	Positively Yours	아기가 생겼어요	Channel A	Kim Jin-sung	So Hae-won (Note: Adaptation of Positively Yours by Lee Jung)	Media Group Take Two; Studio PIC	

==== Trii Studio ====
Drama credits of Trii Studio
Year	Title		Network	Credited as			Ref.
Year	English	Korean	Network	Director	Screenwriter	Producer	Ref.
2025	Ms. Incognito	착한 여자 부세미	ENA	Park Yoo-young	Hyun Kyu-ri	Kross Pictures; Trii Studio	

== Accolades ==
=== State honors ===
Name of the organization, year presented, and the award given
Country	Award body	Year	Award	Ref.
South Korea	Trade Day (Note: Honors are given at a ceremony on Trade Day' ceremony. Trade Day is a statutory commemorative day established to promote balanced trade development and the will to promote trade. It was established as 'Export Day' on November 30, 1964, to commemorate the achievement of $100 million in exports, and its name was changed to 'Trade Day' in 1990.)	2024	10 Million Dollar Export Tower Award	
South Korea	Trade Day	2025	30 Million Dollar Export Tower Award	

=== Listicles ===
Name of publisher, year listed, name of listicle, and placement
Publisher	Year	Listicle	Placement	Ref.
Cine21	2024	Production Companies to Watch	placed	
Cine21	2026	Production Companies to Watch	Top 3	
Forbes Korea	2025	50 Fastest-growing Startups in Korea by 2025	placed	
