= Kim Chang-wan =

South Korean singer and actor (born 1954)

Kim Chang Wan
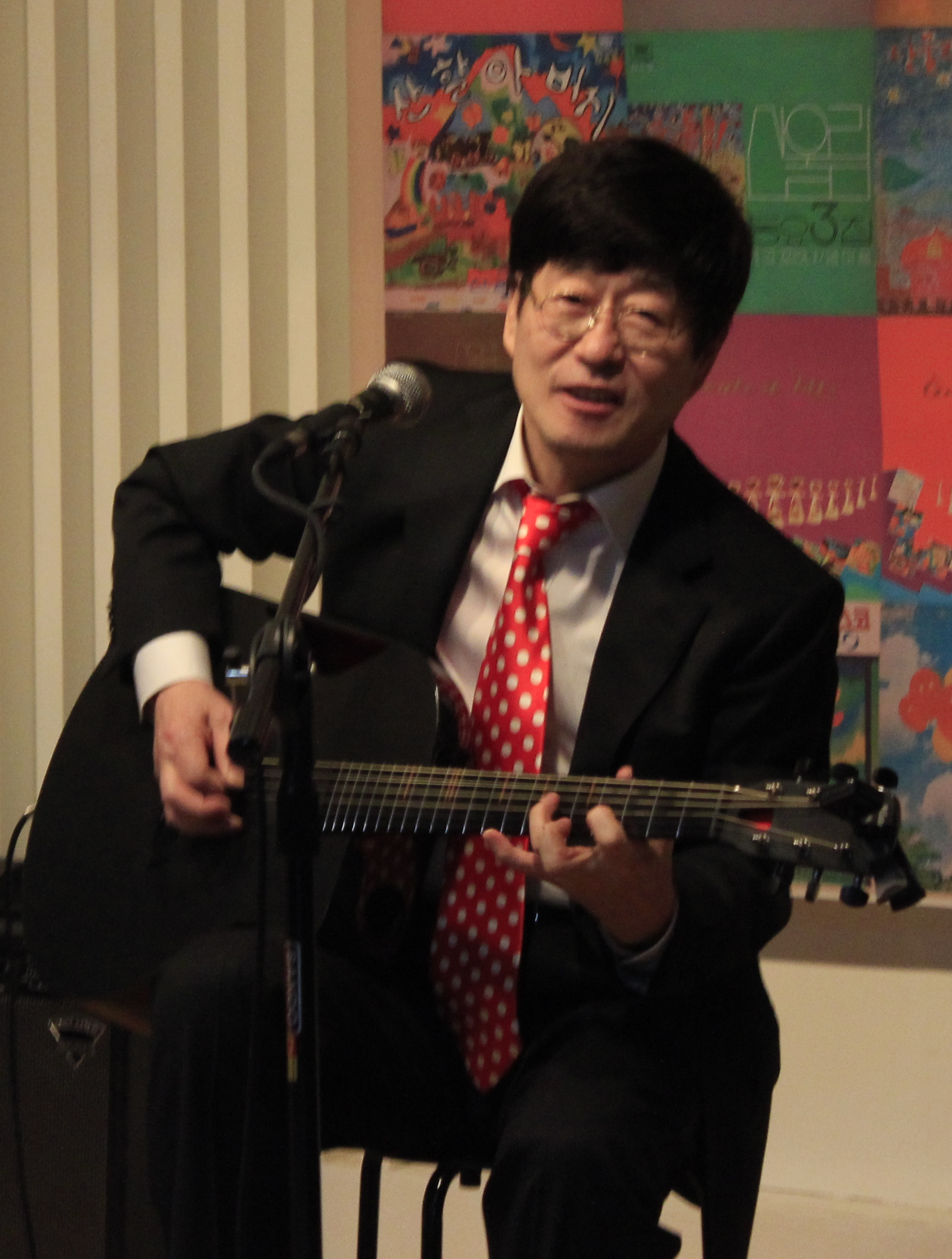
- Kim in February 2016
- Born: February 22, 1954 (age 72); Heukseok-dong, Yeongdeungpo District, Seoul, South Korea
- Education: Seoul National University (Agricultural studies)
- Occupations: Singer; actor; writer
- Years active: 1977–present
- Spouse: Kang Gwi Bin
- Children: 1

Korean name
- Hangul: 김창완
- Hanja: 金昌完
- RR: Gim Changwan
- MR: Kim Ch'angwan
- Website: changwan.com

Kim Chang Wan (Korean: 김창완; born February 22, 1954) is a South Korean singer, actor, and writer.

== Early life and education ==
Kim along with his younger brothers Kim Chang-hoon and Kim Chang-ik, began composing music during their mid-teens, and formed the band Mui when they were college students.

Kim graduated from Seoul National University in 1975 with a bachelor's degree in Agricultural Studies, major in Natural Fiber.

== Career ==
=== 1975–1984: Debut Sanulrim and commercial success and disbandment ===
After Kim graduated in 1975, he and his brothers made their professional career debut and changed their band's name to Sanulrim (산울림 meaning "Mountain Echo"). Kim Chang-wan took the role of lead vocalist and guitarist, Kim Chang-hoon played rhythm guitar, bass and keyboards, and Kim Chang-ik played drums.

In 1977, Sanulrim released their first album What, Already?, which became a critical and commercial success. The band's psychedelic rock/hard rock sound was music Koreans hadn't heard before, and Sanulrim revitalized the Korean music scene, which was currently devastated after several major musicians were arrested for marijuana possession in the 1970s.

From 1977 to 1984, they released more than 10 albums and became one of the most influential and beloved figures in the Korean rock music scene. With the K-pop retrospective boom during the 1990s, all of their albums were reissued and a tribute album was released. They held a 30th anniversary concert in 2007 and made plans to release a 14th album.

=== 1982–present: Writing, disbandment of Sanulrim, eponymous band and acting career ===
His 1990 book I Want to Live Just Until 20 Years Old was adapted into a 1992 film.

On January 29, 2008, drummer Kim Chang-ik was killed in a traffic accident in Vancouver, British Columbia, Canada. Sanulrim disbanded after his death.

In 2008, Kim founded the eponymous Kim Chang-wan Band, with himself on vocals, keyboardist Lee Sang-hoon, bassist Choi Won-sik, drummer Kang Yoon-gi and guitarist Yeom Min-yeol. They released one album, Bus, and several EPs. Kim also contributes to soundtracks and collaborates with younger artists, such as IU.

Having worked as a music director and film score composer in the early 1990s, Kim Chang-wan also began acting onscreen. He has appeared in supporting roles in film and television, notably in dramedy The Happy Funeral Director, omnibus Beating Heart, medical drama Behind the White Tower, and romantic comedies Coffee Prince, Queen of Housewives, and My Love from the Star.

In 2013, he played the leading role of a psychopathic plastic surgeon in the slasher film Doctor. The versatile Kim has also starred in a stage play (A Nap in 2010), hosted variety shows and radio programs, and written several books (some containing poetry).

== Discography ==
=== Studio albums ===
List of studio albums, showing selected details
Title	Details
I'm an Earthling	Released: November 24, 2023; Format: Digital download, streaming; track listing: 1. I'm an Earthling; 2. Old Man's Bench; 3. Moonlight; 4. Two of Us; 5. A Stone-cold Tea; 6. Youth; 7. Time; 8. Where are You, Sister?; 9. Anesthesia; 10. Teacup; 11. Love the Beautiful; 12. I'd Want to Talk; 13. Mom, I Love You

=== Singles ===
List of singles as featured artist, showing year released, selected chart positions, sales figures, and name of the album
Title	Year	Peak chart positions		Sales	Album
Title	Year	KOR	KOR Hot	Sales	Album
"The Meaning of You" (너의 의미) (IU featuring Kim Chang-wan; Sanulrim cover)	2014	3	2	KOR: 2,500,000	A Flower Bookmark

=== Promotional singles ===
List of promotional singles, showing year released and name of the album
Title	Year	Album
"8th Grader (Respect Your Dreams)" (Kim Chang-wan and Seo Chang-bin)	2024	Non-album single

== Filmography ==
=== Television series ===
Year	Title	Role
1983	MBC Bestseller Theater: "Windmills of My Mind"	Music director
1985	Song of the Sea	Kim Chang-soo
1989	Sleepless Tree	Chang-min
1991	Windmills of Love	Singer
1995	MBC Best Theater: "Report on Sex Mosaic"	
1995	Drama Game: "Man Baking Yachae Sikppang"	Go Si-bong
1995	Love Formula	Jung Woon-hyun
1996	MBC Best Theater: "Woman in the Antechamber"	Section chief Lee
1996	Under the Seoul Sky	Go Geo-bong
1996	Garden with Golden Light	Jae-yong
1997	Today's Sou'easter	
1998	Piano	
1998	Memories	Seung-wan
1998	Eun-shil	Kim Byung-gook
1998	MBC Best Theater: "Mr. Gong Choon-taek's Contract Marriage"	
1999	MBC Best Theater: "The Golden Era of Aenok"	
1999	MBC Best Theater: "Goodbye Audrey Hepburn"	
1999	MBC Best Theater: "There is Nothing Wrong with the Yeouido Electric Line."	
1999	Half	
1999	KAIST	Professor Choi
1999	Sweet Bride	
2000	MBC Best Theater: "A Woman I Want to Hit"	
2000	Mr. Duke	
2001	Sun-hee and Jin-hee	Detective Park Doo-man
2001	Cummi, the Fairy	Oh Myung-tae's father
2001	Well Known Woman	Doctor Joo
2002	MBC Best Theater	
2002	Sunlight Upon Me	Joo Min-ho
2002	Since We Met	Jo Nam-sik
2002	To Be with You	Lee Deok-soo
2003	Long Live Love	Lee Hyun-sik
2003	While You Were Dreaming	
2003	Span Drama: "Waiting for Godot"	
2004	MBC Best Theater: "Your Brother Is Back"	
2004	First Love of a Royal Prince	Kim Yu-bin's father
2004	Ireland	Moon Jae-seok
2004	Love Story in Harvard	Jin-chul
2005	Beating Heart	Kim Chang-wan
2005	Rainbow Romance	Father of Eun-kyung, Eun-bi, and Jae-kyung
2006	Love Truly	Kang San
2006	The Vineyard Man	Lee Hyung-man
2007	Behind the White Tower	Woo Yong-gil
2007	Several Questions That Make Us Happy	Byung-ki
2007	Coffee Prince	Hong Gae-shik
2007	Cruel Love	Hwang In-soo
2008	Iljimae	King Injo
2008	Worlds Within	Park Hyun-seob
2009	Queen of Housewives	Kim Hong-shik
2009	Triple	Kim Bok-man (cameo)
2010	Golden House	Kim Sang-chul
2010	Queen of Reversals	Mok Young-chul
2011	Miss Ripley	Director Choi
2011	A Thousand Kisses	Jang Byung-shik
2011	What's Up	Park Tae-yi's father
2012	Take Care of Us, Captain	Han Gyu-pil
2012	The King's Doctor	Jung Sung-jo
2013	The End of the World	Choi Soo-chul
2013	Who Are You?	Choi Moon-shik
2013	Good Doctor	Chairman Jung
2013	My Love from the Star	Jang Young-mok
2014	Secret Affair	Min Yong-ki
2014	Secret Door	Kim Taek
2015	Great Stories	Narrator
2015	Splendid Politics	Yi Won-ik
2016–2017	Hwarang: The Poet Warrior Youth	Park Yeong-shi
2017	Whisper	Lee Ho-beom
2017	Children of the 20th Century	Sa Chang-wan
2017	Jugglers	Vice President Do Tae-geun
2018	Something in the Rain	Seo Joon-hee's father
2019	One Spring Night	Kwon Gi-seok's father
2020	Find Me in Your Memory	Yoo Seong-hyeok
2020	It's Okay to Not Be Okay	Oh Ji-wang
2020–2021	Awaken	Gong Il-do
2021	One the Woman	Noh Hak-tae
2021	Oh My Ladylord	Kim Chang-gyu
2022	Why Her	Baek Jin-gi
2022	Bad Prosecutor	Seo Hyun-gyu
2023	The Real Has Come!	Jang-ho

=== Film ===
Year	Title	Role	Notes
1980	Three Women Under the Umbrella	—N/a	Music director
1989	Happiness Does Not Come in Grades	—N/a	Music director
1990	I Stand Every Day	—N/a	Music director
1990	Well, Let's Look at the Sky Sometimes	—N/a	Music director
1991	Byung-pal's Diary	—N/a	Music director
1992	I Want to Live Just Until 20 Years Old	—N/a	Music director; Author of original book
1993	Young-gu and Princess Zzu Zzu	—N/a	Music director
1993	A Dangerous Woman 2	—N/a	Music director
1993	Young-gu Home Alone 2	—N/a	Music director
1996	Jungle Story	Ji-woo	
1997	Repechage	—N/a	Music director
1999	The Ring Virus	Reporter Kim	
2000	The Happy Funeral Director	Pan Cheol-gu	
2001	A Day	Dr. Jo	
2001	Making Sun-dried Red Peppers	—N/a	Sound department
2003	Owl (short film)		Music director
2004	100 Days with Mr. Arrogant	Kang Ha-yeong's father	
2004	Windstruck	Chief of police substation	
2004	Shinsukki Blues	Na In-cheol	
2008	Antique	White beard	
2009	Heaven's Postman	Lee Moon-gyo	
2010	Blades of Blood	King Seonjo	
2012	Wonderful Radio	Himself (voice cameo)	
2013	Doctor	Choi In-beom	

=== Television and radio shows ===
Year	Title	Notes
	Memories of Pop Music with Kim Chang-wan	DJ
	Turn on the Radio with Kim Chang-wan	DJ
1978	7:00 p.m. Date	DJ
1981	11 Pop	DJ
1990	Between Dreams and Music	DJ
1996	Golden Disk with Kim Chang-wan	DJ
1997	Beautiful Morning with Shin Eun-kyung and Kim Chang-wan	MC
1998	발명Q 원리를 찾아라	MC
1998	Three Stories with Kim Chang-wan	
2000–present	This Beautiful Morning, This Is Kim Chang-wan	DJ
2006	Science Cafe	MC
2008–2010	Music Travel Lalala	MC
2009	목숨걸고 편식하다	Documentary narrator
2010–2011	Global Education Issue	MC
2013–2014	Bookmark Culture	MC

== Theater ==
Year	Title	Role	Notes
2008	Van Gogh and the Sunflower Boy (반 고흐와 해바라기 소년)	—N/a	Composer
2010	A Nap (낮잠)	Han Young-jin	

== Bibliography ==
Year	Title
1982	Love Is Too Bitter for Me (내게 사랑은 너무 써)
1990	I Want to Live Just Until 20 Years Old (스무살까지만 살고 싶어요)
1995	The Road Home (집에 가는 길)
2001	Dad's Gift (아빠의 선물)
2004	Brat (개구쟁이)
2005	이제야 보이네
2008	네가 있어 다행이야
2009	사일런트 머신 길자
2011	Soul Food (소울푸드)

== Awards and nominations ==
Year	Award	Category	Nominated work	Result
1978	TBC Music Awards	Silver Prize, 중창 category		Won
1981	KBS Music Awards	중창 category		Won
1995	MBC Drama Awards	Excellence Award, Radio category		Won
1997	10th 대한민국 동요대상	동요를 사랑하는 가수상		Won
2007	MBC Drama Awards	PD Award	Behind the White Tower, Coffee Prince	Won
2008	23rd Golden Disk Awards	Lifetime Achievement Award	—N/a	Won
2009	MBC Drama Awards	Golden Acting Award, Actor in a Miniseries	Queen of Housewives, Triple	Won
2010	The Voice of SBS Awards	Recipient	This Beautiful Morning, This Is Kim Chang-wan	Won
2010	SBS Entertainment Awards	Best Radio DJ	This Beautiful Morning, This Is Kim Chang-wan	Won
2011	23rd Korea PD Awards	Best Performer, Radio Host category	This Beautiful Morning, This Is Kim Chang-wan	Won
2014	3rd APAN Star Awards	Best Supporting Actor	My Love from the Star	Nominated
2014	SBS Drama Awards	Special Award, Actor in a Drama Special	My Love from the Star	Won
2021	SBS Drama Awards	Best Character Award, Actor	One the Woman	Nominated
