= The Happy Loner =

2017 South Korean TV series

- Promotional poster
- Hangul: 개인주의자 지영씨
- Hanja: 個人主義者 지영씨
- Lit.: Individualist Ms. Ji-young
- RR: Gaeinjuuija Jiyeongssi
- MR: Kaeinjuŭija Chiyŏngssi
- Genre: Romantic-comedy
- Created by: KBS Drama Production
- Written by: Kwon Hye-ji
- Directed by: Park Hyun-suk
- Starring: Min Hyo-rin; Gong Myung
- Country of origin: South Korea
- Original language: Korean
- No. of episodes: 2

Production
- Executive producers: Ji Byung-hyun; Kim Hoon-jae; Lee Tae-hyun
- Producer: Mo Won
- Running time: 70 minutes
- Production company: Cross Media

Original release
- Network: KBS2
- Release: May 8 – May 9, 2017

The Happy Loner (Korean: 개인주의자 지영씨) is a two-episode Korean drama that aired on KBS2 from May 8 to May 9, 2017, starring Min Hyo-rin and Gong Myung.

== Synopsis ==
A thorough individualist, Ji-young, who avoids relationships with others, meets Byuk-soo, who can't live without having relationships.

== Cast ==
- Min Hyo-rin as Na Ji-young
  - Kang Joo-ha as Na Ji-young (child)
  - Ryu Han-bi as Na Ji-young (young)
- Gong Myung as Park Byuk-soo
- Oh Na-ra as Jung Soo-kyung
- Ji Il-joo as Yeon-suk
- Jang Hee-ryung as Ye-jin
- Kang Jae-joon as Choi Dae-ri
- Kim Jae-hwa as Nurse Park
- Yoon Ji-won as Nurse Kim
- Yoon Bok-in as Na Ji-young's mother
- Jo Seung-yeon as Na Ji-young's father
- Kim Hee-ryung as Park Byuk-soo's mother-in-law
- Kim Sun-ha as Na Ji-young's colleague
- Sujin as Park Yeon-hee

== Ratings ==
In this table, the blue numbers represent the lowest ratings and the red numbers represent the highest ratings.

Ep.	Broadcast date	Average audience share			
Ep.	Broadcast date	TNmS		AGB Nielsen	
Ep.	Broadcast date	Nationwide	Seoul	Nationwide	Seoul
1	May 8, 2017	2.9%	3.8%	2.4%	3.4%
2	May 9, 2017	4.3%	5.0%	4.8%	5.5%

== Awards and nominations ==
Year	Award	Category	Nominee	Result
2017	31st KBS Drama Awards	Best Actor in a One-Act/Special/Short Drama	Gong Myung	Nominated
2017	31st KBS Drama Awards	Best Actress in a One-Act/Special/Short Drama	Min Hyo-rin	Nominated
