= Drama Stage =

2017 South Korean weekly television program

- Promotional poster for season 6
- Also known as: 'O'pening' (Note: From season 5 to episode 1 of season 8) tvN X TVING Short Drama Curation (Note: From episode 2 of season 8 onwards)
- Hangul: 드라마 스테이지
- RR: Deurama seuteiji
- MR: Tŭrama sŭt'eiji
- Genre: Drama
- Created by: CJ ENM Entertainment Division
- Country of origin: South Korea
- Original language: Korean
- No. of seasons: 8
- No. of episodes: 72 (list of episodes)

Production
- Executive producers: Jinnie Choi (seasons 1–3); Kim Young-kyu (seasons 4-6); Jang Kyung-ik (seasons 7-8)
- Camera setup: Single-camera
- Running time: 70 minutes
- Production company: Studio Dragon (in partnership with some other production companies)
- Budget: ₩13 billion (season 1) (approx. US$18 million)

Original release
- Network: TVN
- Release: December 2, 2017 – present

Drama Stage (Korean: 드라마 스테이지) is a South Korean weekly television program featuring ten one-act dramas, which is similar to Drama Special broadcast on KBS2. The short plays were created by writers selected from the O'pen Drama Storyteller Exhibition. (Note: O'pen is CJ E&M's collaboration with its drama production subsidiaries Studio Dragon and CJ Cultural Foundation to provide an open creative space and opportunity for those who dream of becoming a pen (a writer): television and film scriptwriters. This is a creative development and debut support project that supports the entire process from script planning and development, video production, organization and business matching. CJ E&M boosts investment ₩13 billion (season 1) (approx. US$18 million) to grow drama and movie writers.) O'pen writers were recruited through an open call between January and March 2017. A total of 3,700 aspiring writers applied for the competition with scripts for dramas or films during the contest period of about two months. Dozen of various drama and film industry officials judged the scripts in two to three rounds. The jury finally selected 35 new writers, including 20 new drama writers and 15 new movie writers. Held by CJ E&M, these were adapted as one-act dramas produced by the former's subsidiary Studio Dragon in partnership with other companies. It aired on TVN every Saturday midnight.

On April 15, 2022, it was announced by tvN that with season 5 the name of Drama Stage would be changed to 'O'PENing'. The 'Drama Stage', aired only one-act plays, but 'O'PENing' would broadcast two series and eight one-act episodes.

On September 23, 2025, tvN announced another title change to the anthology program: starting from episode 2 (Hwaja's Scarlet) of season 8, the program title was changed to "tvN X TVING Short Drama Curation" (tvN X TVING 단편 드라마 큐레이션) and the promotional slogan A surefire pleasure in just one episode (한 편으로 시작하는 확실한 즐거움) was used, signalling the return to the one-episode format.

== Episodes ==
Season	Episodes	Originally released	
Season	Episodes	First released	Last released
1	10	December 2, 2017	February 3, 2018
2	10	December 1, 2018	February 2, 2019
3	10	November 23, 2019	January 30, 2020
4	10	March 3, 2021	April 21, 2021
5	12	May 2, 2022	August 5, 2022
6	8	July 16, 2023	August 27, 2023
7	7	July 15, 2024	October 20, 2024
8	5	August 17, 2025	December 9, 2025

== See also ==
- Drama Special
- Drama Festa
