= Kim Sung-hong =

South Korean film director (born 1956)

- Born: August 7, 1956 (age 68); Busan, South Korea
- Education: Chung-Ang University; Theater and Film
- Occupation: director

Korean name
- Hangul: 김성홍
- Hanja: 金成鴻
- RR: Gim Seonghong
- MR: Kim Sŏnghong

Kim Sung-hong (Korean: 김성홍; born August 7, 1956) is a South Korean film director.

== Filmography ==
- Doctor (닥터, Dak teol) (2012)
- Missing (실종, Sil Jong) (2009)
- Say Yes (세이 예스 Sae-yi yaeseu) (2001)
- A Growing Business (신장개업, Shinjang gaeub) (1998)
- The Hole (올가미, Olgami) (1997)
- Deep Scratch (손톱, Sontob) (1994)
- Teenage Coup (열일곱살의 쿠데타 Yeolilgobsaleui coup d'etat) (1991)
- Well, Let's Look at the Sky Sometimes (그래 가끔 하늘을 보자, Geurae gaggeum haneuleul boja) (1990)
