= Min Hyo-rin =

South Korean actress (born 1986)

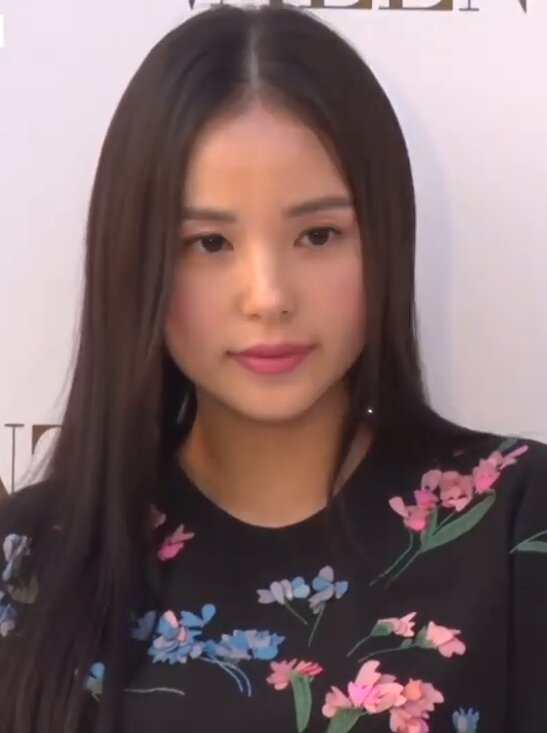
- Min in September 2018
- Born: Jung Eun-ran; 5 February 1986 (age 40); Dong District, Daegu, South Korea
- Occupations: Actress; singer
- Years active: 2006–present
- Agents: Plum; JYP
- Spouse: Taeyang (m. 2018)
- Children: 1

Korean name
- Hangul: 정은란
- RR: Jeong Eunran
- MR: Chŏng Ŭllan

Stage name
- Hangul: 민효린
- RR: Min Hyorin
- MR: Min Hyorin

Jung Eun-ran (Korean: 정은란; born 5 February 1986), better known by the stage name Min Hyo-rin, is a South Korean actress, model and singer. She made her breakthrough with her role in the South Korean film Sunny (2011), followed by The Grand Heist (2012) – both cited as one of South Korea's highest-grossing box office hits.

== Career ==
Born in Dong-gu, Daegu, South Korea as Jung Eun-ran, she adopted the stage name Min Hyo-rin when she began modeling for the clothing brand Flapper in 2006. She then appeared in several music videos for Park Ki-young and F.T. Island. Before her singing debut, large teaser posters of her were displayed around the hot spots of Seoul as a promotional stunt. She released the album RinZ in 2007, and the single Touch Me in 2008.

In 2009 Min made her acting debut in the television series Triple opposite Lee Jung-jae and Song Joong-ki. She was the lead actress in a 2010 web series adapted from Alain de Botton's novel Romantic Movement, with four different directors each shooting short films in various locations around Seoul.

Min was paired with singer Seven in the reality show Fox's Butler, and hosted the sixth season of cable channel Mnet's Trend Report Feel from 2010 to 2011.

In 2011, she and Choi Daniel starred in Age of Milk, a short film that was shot using a Samsung Galaxy S smartphone and aired on cable channel OCN. Later that year, she was cast in the TV series Romance Town with Sung Yu-ri and Kim Min-jun, and appeared in Song Jieun's music video "Going Crazy."

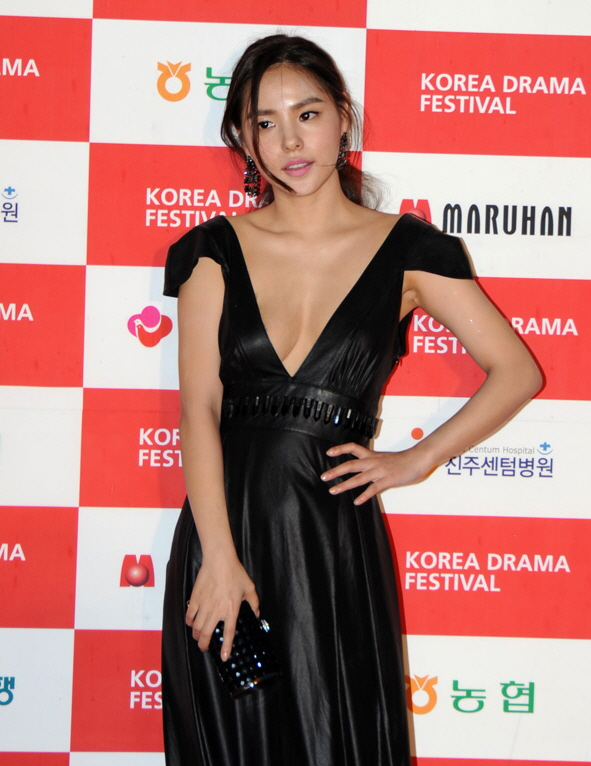
Min at the Korean Drama Festival

After being part of the ensemble cast of 2011 retro drama Sunny along with Shim Eun-kyung and Kang So-ra, Min played Cha Tae-hyun's love interest in the 2012 period comedy The Grand Heist. Both were huge box office hits. In 2012, Min co-starred with Jo Sung-ha and Park Jin-young in A Millionaire on the Run (also known as Five Million Dollar Man). She next starred in Twenty, a film that depicts the lives and loves of three male friends in their twenties.

In 2015, Min headlined the music drama Persevere Goo Hae Ra, produced by Mnet.

In 2016, Min became a regular cast member in the KBS reality television show Sister's Slam Dunk.

In March 2017, Min signed with Plum Entertainment after her contract with JYP Entertainment ended. The same year, she starred in the two-episode drama The Happy Loner and the cycling film Uhm Bok-dong.

== Personal life ==
Min began a relationship with singer Taeyang, member of the South Korean boy band Big Bang in 2013. In December 2017, it was confirmed by their respective agencies that they were engaged. They married on 3 February 2018 in a private church ceremony.

On 27 September 2021, Min's agency announced that Min was pregnant and awaiting childbirth. In November 2021, Min gave birth to a healthy son.

== Filmography ==
=== Film ===
Year	Title	Role	Notes	Ref.
2011	Age of Milk	Jin	Short film; also aired on OCN	
2011	Sunny	Jung Soo-ji		
2012	The Grand Heist	Baek Soo-ryun		
2012	A Millionaire on the Run	Mi-ri		
2015	Twenty	Jin-joo		
2016	Was Will	A girl from the future 2116	Mockumentary	
2019	Uhm Bok-dong	Kyeong-ja		

=== Television series ===
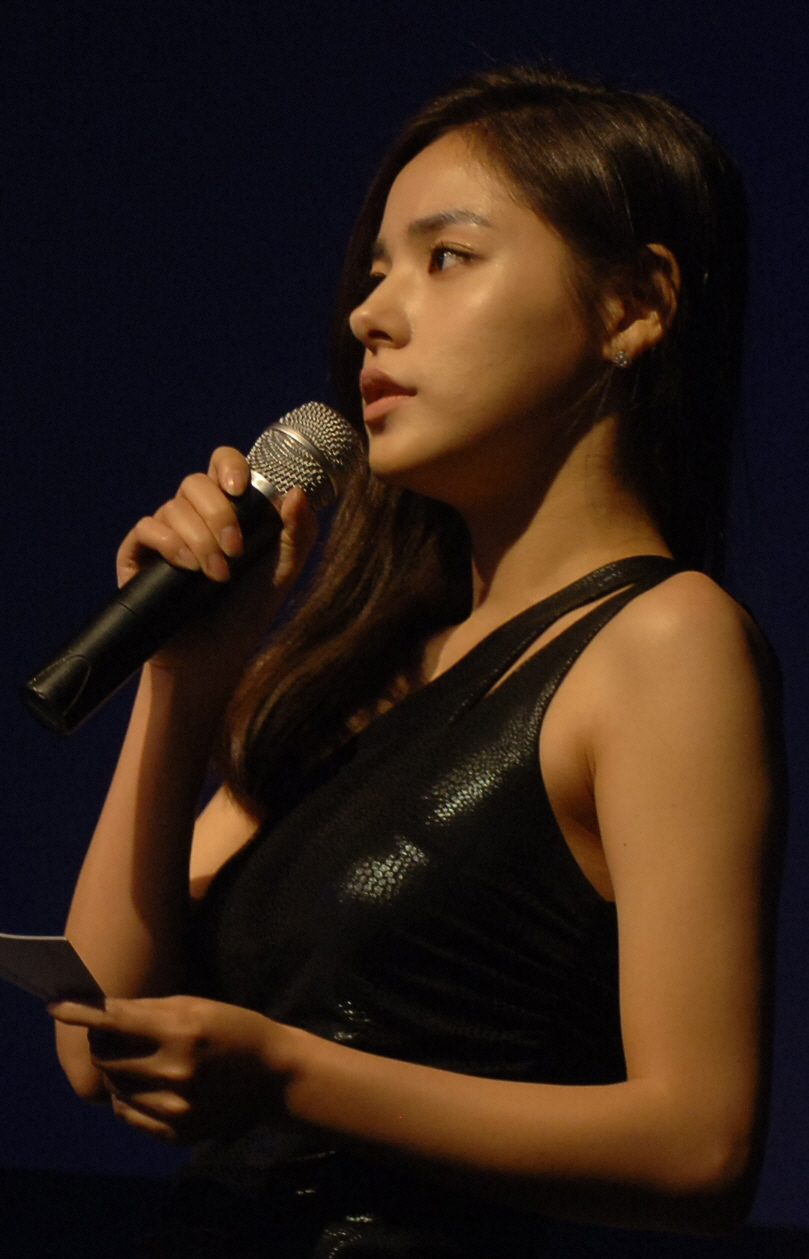
Min at the LG Optimus LTE showcase event in 2011

Year	Title	Role	Notes	Ref.
2009	Triple	Lee Ha-ru		
2010	Dr. Champ	Nurse	Cameo (Episode 16)	
2011	Romance Town	Jung Da-kyum		
2015	Persevere, Goo Hae-ra	Goo Hae-ra		
2017	The Happy Loner	Na Ji-young	two-episode drama	

=== Web series ===
Year	Title	Role	Notes
2010	The Romantic Movement: Seoul	Alice	My Bloody Valentine; My Sweet Blanket; The Tarot Players

=== Variety show ===
Year	Title	Role	Ref.
2010	Fox's Butler	Cast member	
2010–2011	Trend Report Feel 6	Host	
2016	Sister's Slam Dunk	Cast member	

=== Music video appearances ===
Year	Song title	Artist
2006	"Because of You"	Park Ki-young
2007	"A Man's First Love; Follows Him to the Grave"	F.T. Island
2007	"Only One Person"	F.T. Island
2007	"Men Are... Also Helpless"	Evan
2008	"Energy"	Mighty Mouth feat. Sunye
2010	"More and More"	Jo Sung-mo feat. Electroboyz
2011	"Going Crazy"	Song Ji-eun feat. Bang Yong-guk
2014	"Eyes, Nose, Lips"	Taeyang
2014	"1AM"	Taeyang
2014	"Feel"	Lee Jun-ho
2016	"Shut Up"	Unnies

== Discography ==
Album information	Track listing
RinZ: Min-Hyo-rin First Album: Album; Released: 16 May 2007; Label: Star Fox & Yedang Entertainment	Track listing: 1. Stars; 2. 기다려 늑대; 3. 그립습니다; 4. Stars (Inst.); 5. 기다려 늑대 (Inst.)
Touch Me: Single; Released: 14 March 2008; Label: Star Fox & Yedang Entertainment	Track listing: 1. Touch me 2. Touch me (Inst.)

== Awards and nominations ==
Year	Award	Category	Nominated work	Result	Ref.
2007	Mnet KM Music Festival	Best New Artist	"Stars"	Nominated	
2009	28th MBC Drama Awards	Best New Actress	Triple	Nominated	
2011	19th Korean Culture & Entertainment Awards	Best New Actress (Film)	Sunny	Won	
2011	25th KBS Drama Awards	Best Supporting Actress	Romance Town	Nominated	
2012	16th Puchon International Fantastic Film Festival	Fantasia Award	—N/a	Won	
2012	49th Grand Bell Awards	Photogenic Award	—N/a	Won	
2016	15th KBS Entertainment Awards	Variety Show Rookie Award	Sister's Slam Dunk	Won	
2017	2nd Asia Artist Awards	Choice Award	The Happy Loner	Won	
