= Shin Hyun-been =

South Korean actress (born 1986)

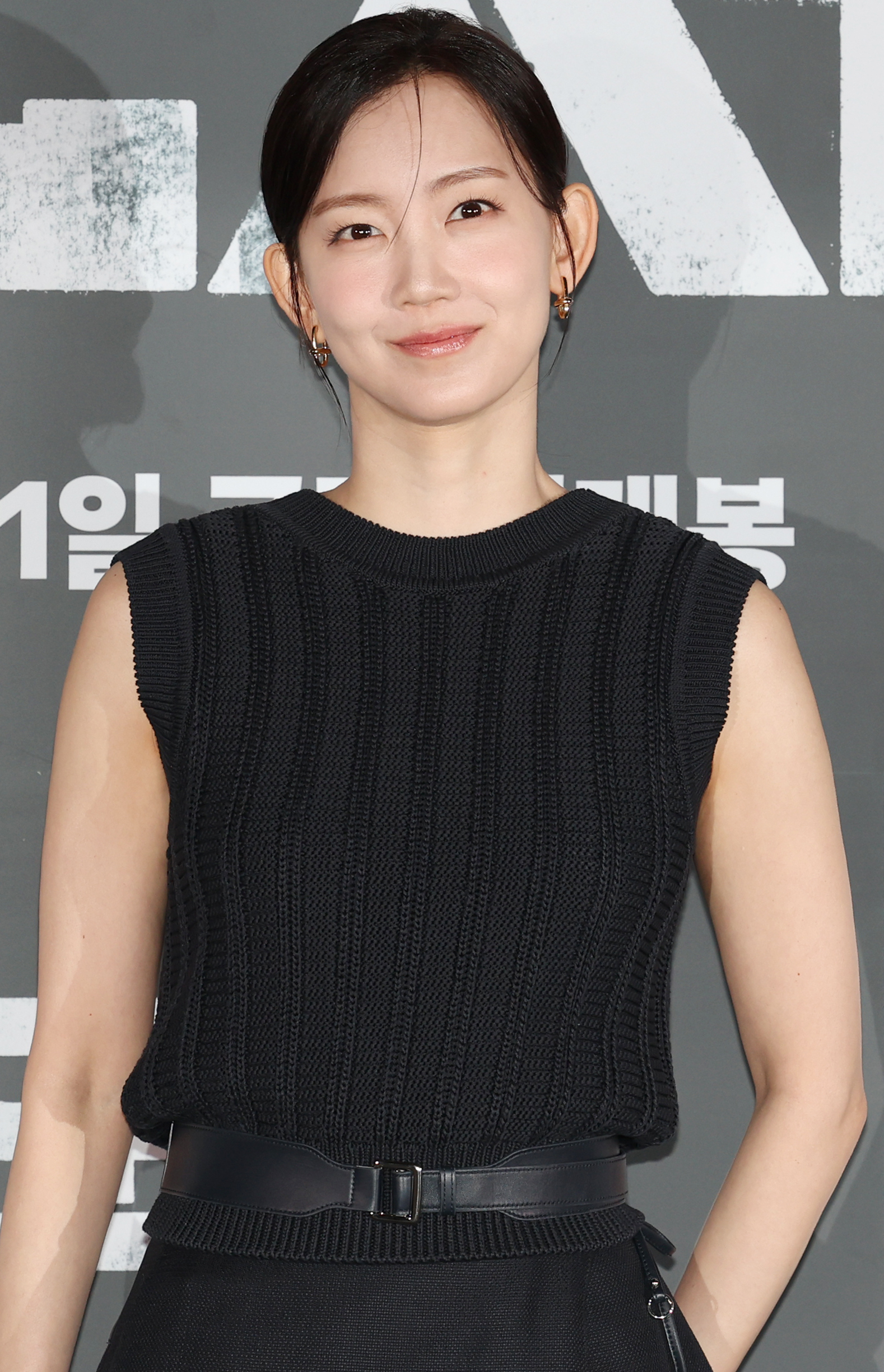
- Shin in 2026
- Born: Kwak Hyun-been; April 10, 1986 (age 40); South Korea
- Education: Korea National University of Arts (Art Theory)
- Occupation: Actress
- Years active: 2010–present
- Agent: Yooborn Company

Korean name
- Hangul: 곽현빈
- Hanja: 郭鉉彬
- RR: Gwak Hyeonbin
- MR: Kwak Hyŏnbin

Stage name
- Hangul: 신현빈
- Hanja: 申鉉彬
- RR: Sin Hyeonbin
- MR: Sin Hyŏnbin

Kwak Hyun-been (Korean: 곽현빈; born April 10, 1986), known professionally as Shin Hyun-been (신현빈), is a South Korean actress. Shin started her acting career by starring in the film He's on Duty (2010) and television series Warrior Baek Dong-soo (2011). She gained wider recognition with the television series Hospital Playlist (2020–2021).

== Career ==
Shin Hyun-been wanted to be an actress since high school, but she lacked the confidence to try. After she finished college, Shin decided to participate in various auditions, which landed her the roles in both 2010 black comedy film He's on Duty and 2011 SBS historical action Warrior Baek Dong-soo.

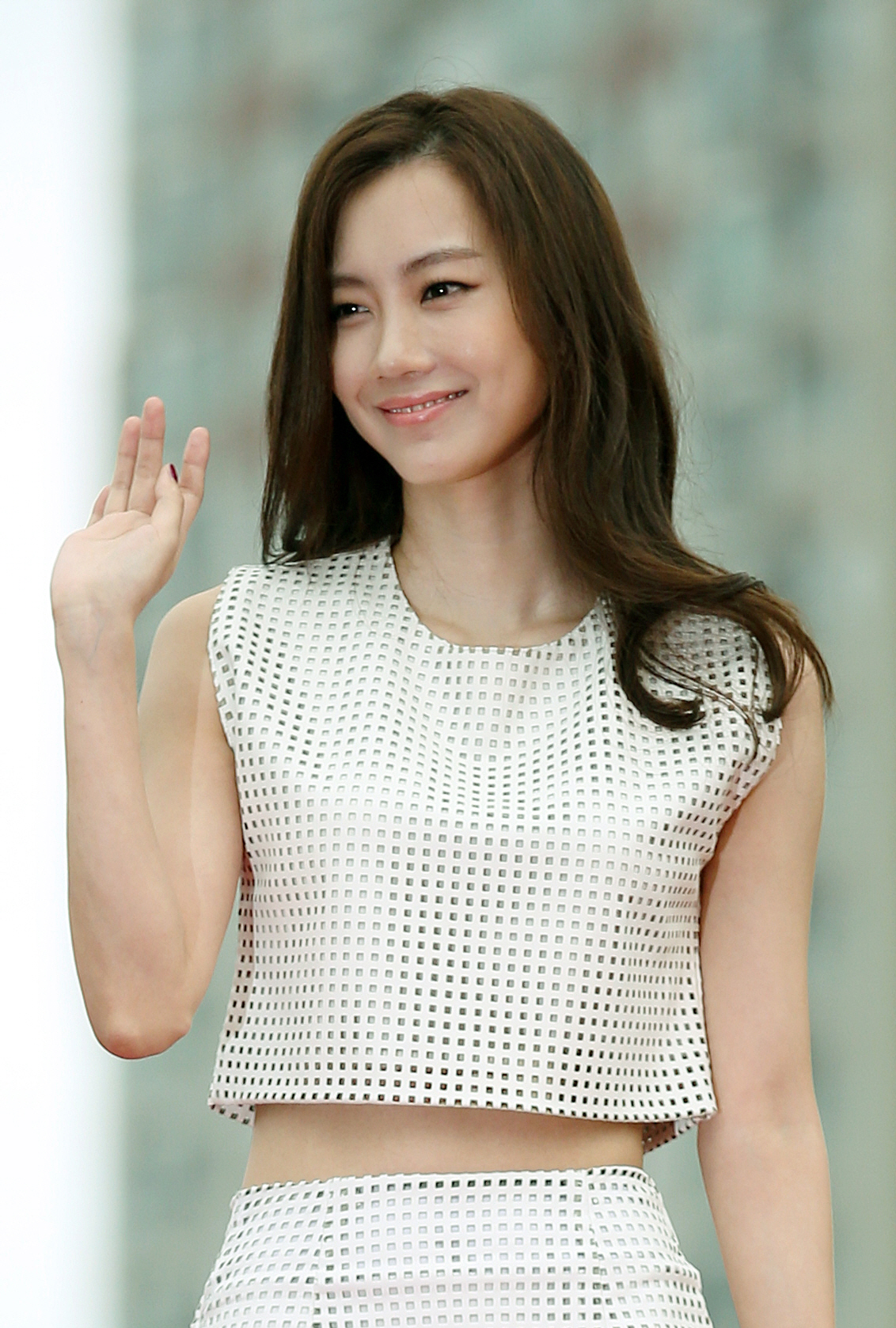
Shin in July 2014

With He's on Duty, Shin won Best New Actress at the prestigious 47th Baeksang Arts Awards for her portrayal of a Vietnamese worker struggling with racism in South Korea. Shin got mainstream recognition with her role as a noble young woman who hides an important map tattoo on her body with the highly rated TV series Warrior Baek Dong-soo.

Shin's next breakthrough came in 2019-2020. In 2019 she was cast as the female lead of tvN's crime mystery Confession, followed by the 2020 ensemble cast thriller film Beasts Clawing at Straws, for which Shin was nominated at the 41st Blue Dragon Film Awards.

After her standout role as a resident and then fellow of General Surgery in the 2020–2021 medical series Hospital Playlist, Shin accepted offers to star in several series, among them JTBC's 2022 fantasy revenge series Reborn Rich where she acted as an anti-corruption prosecutor and 2023 melodrama romance Tell Me That You Love Me, a remake of the 1995 Japanese series Aishiteiru to Itte Kure.

In 2024, Shin led the Coupang Play's workplace romantic comedy Cinderella at 2 AM.

Shin has frequently cooperated with famed director Yeon Sang-ho. After the miniseries Monstrous, she went on to star in his three latest films consecutively, the 2025-released Revelations and The Ugly, followed by the upcoming Colony.

== Filmography ==
=== Film ===
Year	Title	Role	Notes	Ref.
2010	He's on Duty	Jang-mi		
2012	Almost Che	Site reporter	Cameo	
2015	The Lost Choices	Chae Ji-eun		
2017	Confidential Assignment	Hwa-ryung		
2018	Seven Years of Night	Moon Ha-young		
2018	Sunset in My Hometown	Mi-kyung		
2018	Take Point	Lee Ji-soo		
2019	Cheer Up, Mr. Lee	Hye-yeong		
2020	The Closet	Seung-hee		
2020	Beasts Clawing at Straws	Mi-ran		
2025	Revelations	Lee Yeon-hee		
2025	The Ugly	Jung Young-hee		
2026	Colony	Gong Seol-hee		

=== Television series ===
Year	Title	Role	Notes	Ref.
2011	Warrior Baek Dong-soo	Yoo Ji-sun		
2011	Kimchi Family	Yukie		
2012	Family Portrait	Han Mi-hwa		
2014	Mimi	Jang Eun-hye		
2016	Madame Antoine: The Love Therapist	Claire	Cameo	
2017	Queen of Mystery	Jung Ji-won		
2017	Argon	Chae Soo-min		
2017	Rain or Shine	Architect	Cameo (Episode 16)	
2018	Mistress	Kim Eun-soo		
2019	Confession	Ha Yoo-ri		
2020–2021	Hospital Playlist	Jang Gyeo-ul	Season 1–2	
2021	Reflection of You	Goo Hae-won		
2022	Monstrous	Lee Soo-jin		
2022	Reborn Rich	Seo Min-young		
2023	Tell Me That You Love Me	Jung Mo-eun		
2024	Cinderella at 2 AM	Ha Yoon-seo		
2025	Resident Playbook	Jang Gyeo-ul	Special appearance	

=== Music video appearances ===
Year	Song title	Artist	Ref.
2011	"I Shouldn't Have Gone"	Kim Jin-pyo (feat. Jooyoung)	
2013	"Walking Dead"	Kim Jin-pyo (feat. Lyn)	
2014	"Hate"	Epitone Project	
2017	"Paper Umbrella"	Yesung	
2021	"Don't Look Back"	Sechs Kies	

== Theater ==
Year	Title	Role	Ref.
2012	Turn Around and Leave (돌아서서 떠나라)	Chae Hee-joo	

== Accolades ==
=== Awards and nominations ===
Name of the award ceremony, year presented, category, nominee(s) of the award, and the result of the nomination
Award	Year	Category	Nominee / Work	Result	Ref.
APAN Star Awards	2022	Excellence Award, Actress in a Miniseries	Hospital Playlist 2 and Reflection of You	Nominated	
Baeksang Arts Awards	2011	Best New Actress – Film	He's on Duty	Won	
Baeksang Arts Awards	2026	Best Supporting Actress – Film	The Ugly	Nominated	
Blue Dragon Film Awards	2021 (Note: Initially scheduled for December 11, 2020, the award was postponed to 2021 due to COVID-19 pandemic.)	Best New Actress	Beasts Clawing at Straws	Nominated	
Blue Dragon Film Awards	2025	Best Supporting Actress	The Ugly	Nominated	
Golden Cinematography Awards	2026	Best Supporting Actress	The Ugly	Won	
Korea Drama Awards	2019	Best New Actress	Confession	Nominated	
Korea Drama Awards	2022	Top Excellence Award, Actress	Reflection of You	Won	
Korean Film Awards	2010	Best New Actress	He's on Duty	Nominated	
SBS Drama Awards	2011	New Star Award	Warrior Baek Dong-soo	Won	

=== Listicles ===
Name of publisher, year listed, name of listicle, and placement
Publisher	Year	Listicle	Placement	Ref.
Cine21	2021	New Actress to watch out for in 2022	6th (Note: Tied with Go Min-si, Park Eun-bin, Keum Sae-rok, Moon Ga-young, Joo Hyun-young, Park Gyu-young, Lee Soo-kyung, Roh Yoon-seo, Gong Seung-yeon, Lee Se-young, IU, Keum Sae-rok, Park Ji-hu, Han So-hee, Jung Ji-so, Bang Min-ah, Jeon Jong-seo, Roh Jeong-eui)	
Korean Film Council	2021	Korean Actors 200 (Note: Introduces 200 actors that best represent the present and future of Korean cinema to the people in the film industry all over the world.)	Included	
