= The Fake (2013 film) =

- Film poster
- Directed by: Yeon Sang-ho
- Written by: Yeon Sang-ho
- Produced by: Cho Young-kag
- Starring: Yang Ik-june; Oh Jung-se; Kwon Hae-hyo; Park Hee-von
- Edited by: Yeon Sang-ho; Lee Yeon-jung
- Music by: Jang Young-gyu
- Production company: Studio Dada Show
- Distributed by: Next Entertainment World
- Release dates: September 7, 2013 (Toronto); November 21, 2013 (South Korea)
- Running time: 101 minutes
- Country: South Korea
- Language: Korean
- Budget: US$360,000
- Box office: US$147,632

The Fake (Korean: 사이비; RR: Saibi) is a 2013 South Korean adult animated drama film written and directed by Yeon Sang-ho.

The film had its world premiere in the Vanguard section of the 2013 Toronto International Film Festival on September 7, 2013, and went on to screen at various international film festivals before being released domestically on November 21, 2013. It won Best Animation awards at the Sitges Film Festival and Gijón International Film Festival, and was named the Best Korean Independent Film of 2013 by the Association of Korean Independent Film & Video.

A blistering critique of organized religion set in a rural village where a manipulative church minister schemes to defraud his flock, The Fake is Yeon's sophomore feature after the acclaimed and divisive The King of Pigs (2011).

== Plot ==
With their municipality scheduled to be flooded to make way for the construction of a new dam, the devout denizens of a rural village have placed their faith in Choi Gyeong-seok, a church elder who promises to relocate the flock. Choi tells the villagers they will build a church and a new housing development where they will all be able to live together after the town is completely submerged. He also says that only 144,000 people can go to heaven, and that church offerings are mandatory if one wants to "secure their spot." Even the town's much-revered Reverend Sung, a young and good-looking minister who seemingly has the ability to heal the sick, approves of Choi's plans. Behind his guise of devotion, however, Choi is a practiced con man posing as a representative of a fake religion; his true aim is to defraud the villagers of their resettlement compensation. The only obstacle to the scheme is Kim Min-chul, a skeptical outcast who accidentally discovers evidence of Choi's past misdeeds and suddenly finds himself becoming the center of resistance against the church institution.

But Min-chul himself is hardly a saint. One of the village's most vile and untrustworthy characters, Min-chul is a low-life neighborhood thug who gambles and drinks too much. He regularly beats his wife and daughter Young-sun, a young factory worker who's been saving up for her lifelong dream of going to college in Seoul.

No one in the village believes Min-chul and his attempts to expose Choi to the authorities fall on deaf ears. But after Young-sun is forced into prostitution by Choi, Min-chul becomes obsessed with revenge and makes a fateful decision to take matters into his own hands.

== Cast ==
- Yang Ik-june as Kim Min-chul
- Oh Jung-se as Sung Chul-woo
- Kwon Hae-hyo as Choi Gyeong-seok
- Park Hee-von as Kim Young-sun

== Release ==
The Fake went on limited release in South Korea on November 21, 2013. It received almost 22,000 admissions, which is a solid figure for a low-budget independent film.

The film also had a one-week theatrical run from November 15–20, 2013 at the CGV Cinema in Koreatown, Los Angeles, in order to qualify for submission to the Academy Award for Best Animated Feature. It did not get nominated.

== Television adaptation ==
The second season of OCN's Save Me was based on this film. It premiered in May 2019 and concluded in late June 2019.

== Awards and nominations ==
Year	Award	Category	Recipient	Result
2013	46th Sitges Film Festival	Best Animation	The Fake	Won
2013	51st Gijón International Film Festival	Best Animation	The Fake	Won
2013	7th Asia Pacific Screen Awards	Best Animated Feature Film	The Fake	Nominated
2013	Association of Korean Independent Film & Video	Best Korean Independent Film of 2013	The Fake	Won
2014	1st Wildflower Film Awards	Best Director	Yeon Sang-ho	Won
2014	1st Wildflower Film Awards	Best Film	The Fake	Nominated
2014	23rd Buil Film Awards	Best Screenplay	Yeon Sang-ho	Nominated
2014	34th Korean Association of Film Critics Awards	FIPRESCI Award	The Fake	Won
2015	25th Animafest Zagreb	Special Mention	The Fake	Won

== Film festivals ==
The Fake was screened at the following film festivals:

- 2013 Toronto International Film Festival
- 2013 Fantastic Fest
- 2013 Busan International Film Festival
- 2013 Sitges Film Festival
- 2013 AFI Fest
- 2013 Tallinn Black Nights Film Festival
- 2013 Hong Kong Asian Film Festival
- 2014 Göteborg International Film Festival
- 2014 Jameson Dublin International Film Festival
- 2014 Fantasporto
