= Chasing (2016 film) =

- Promotional poster for Chasing
- Directed by: Oh In-chun
- Screenplay by: Oh In-chun (Dramatization)
- Starring: Kim Seung-woo; Kim Jung-tae; Han Sang-hyuk; Shin Kang-woo; Kim Min-gyu; Moon Yong-seok
- Cinematography: Kwon Sang-jun
- Edited by: Mun In-dae
- Music by: Jo On-sung
- Production companies: The Queen D&M
- Distributed by: Opus Pictures
- Release date: January 7, 2016 (South Korea)
- Running time: 96 minutes
- Country: South Korea
- Language: Korean

Chasing (Korean: 잡아야 산다; RR: Jabaya sanda; lit. 'Catch Him to Survive') is a 2016 South Korean action comedy film about a top CEO (played by Kim Seung-woo) who has his cellphone stolen by a fearless gang of male high-school students led by the rebellious Han Won-tae (played by Hyuk of VIXX, in his film debut) and homicide detective (played by Kim Jung-tae) who loses his gun to the same gang of high-school students. Both the gun and the cellphone are very valuable to the CEO and detective. Hence, begins a fast-paced pursuit in order to retrieve their items back from the gang.

The film was directed by Oh In-chun (the director of Mourning Grave) and released in theaters on January 7, 2016.

== Plot ==
One night, Seung-Joo, CEO loses his cellphone to four male high-school students and Jung-Taek, a detective, loses his gun to the same high-school students. The cellphone and gun are very valuable to Seung-Joo and Jung-Taek. The two men must get their items back from the delinquent high school students.

== Cast ==
- Kim Seung-woo as Kim Seung-joo
- Kim Jung-tae as Do Jung-taek
- Han Sang-hyuk as Han Won-tae
- Shin Kang-woo as Shin Jae-kwon
- Kim Min-gyu as Kim Tae-young
- Moon Yong-suk as Moon Sung-min
- Choi Ho-joong as Kang Sil-jang
- Seo Beom-sik as An Gi-sa
- Lee Hae-joon as Seok-jung
- Jo Chang-geun as Jung-don
- Oh Man-seok as Bus driver
- Lee Han-wi as Detective
- Kim Min-kyung
- Ahn Gil-kang as Chairman Wang
- Yeojin Jeon as Subway mother
- Kim Ji-hoo as Subway child
- Kang Nam-gil as Police Commissioner

== Awards and nominations ==
Year	Award	Category	Recipient	Result
2016	Jackie Chan Action Movie Awards (SIFF)	Best Action Movie New Performer	Han Sang-hyuk	Won
