= He's on Duty =

- Directed by: Yook Sang-hyo
- Written by: Yook Sang-hyo
- Produced by: Kim Bok-geun; Lee Se-young
- Starring: Kim In-kwon; Kim Jung-tae
- Cinematography: Jeon Dae-sung
- Edited by: Park Gok-ji
- Music by: Shin Hyung
- Distributed by: Cinergy
- Release date: September 30, 2010
- Running time: 110 minutes
- Country: South Korea
- Language: Korean

He's on Duty (Korean: 방가? 방가!; RR: Bangga? Bangga!; MR: Pangga? Pangga!) is a 2010 South Korean 2010 black comedy film that comically yet incisively depicts racial issues in Korea. Tae-sik finds it difficult to get a job due to his odd appearance and impatient character. After failing repeatedly, he disguises himself as a foreigner and finally lands a job. Tae-sik, however, witnesses the cruel treatment migrant workers face in Korea.

The Korean title is a pun on the lead character's name and is an abbreviated form of 반갑습니다 (bangabseumnida) or 반가워요 (bangawoyo) which translates to "Delighted? Delighted!" or "Nice to meet you."

== Plot ==
Tae-sik is perpetually unemployed, drifting from one job to another, from manual labor to serving coffee. His atypical appearance (dark skin and short height), being rather atypical for a Korean, is to blame it seems, but best buddy Yong-cheol persuades Tae-sik to use these disadvantages. Desperate and with nothing better to do, he adopts an accent and ethnic hat and is reborn as Bang-ga (a twist on his family name) from Bhutan, and lands a job at a chair manufacturing factory.

Despite a shaky beginning ― due to his unredeemable clumsiness, rather than doubts about his alleged Bhutani roots that are all too convincing ― Tae-sik gets along with his co-workers, and even starts romancing the lovely Jang-mi from Vietnam. He is even voted to become president of a migrant workers labor union and competent Korean language instructor, and joins in a harmonious effort to win a local singing competition for foreigners.

Tae-sik begins to truly bond with his co-workers but his loyalties are put to the test when Yong-cheol finds a way to swindle their money.

== Cast ==
- Kim In-kwon as Bang Tae-sik / Bang-ga
- Kim Jung-tae as Yong-cheol
- Shin Hyun-bin as Jang-mi
- Khan Mohammad Asaduzzman as Ali
- Nazarudin as Rajah
- Peter Holman as Charlie
- Eshonkulov Parviz as Michael
- Jeon Gook-hwan as Boss Hwang
- Kim Kang-hee as Miss Hong
- Kim Bo-min as Hye-young
- Park Yeong-soo as Park Kwan-sang
- Jung Tae-won as Dan-poong

== Awards and nominations ==
2010 Korean Film Awards

- Nomination - Best Supporting Actor: Kim Jung-tae
- Nomination - Best New Actress: Shin Hyun-bin
- Nomination - Best Screenplay: Yook Sang-hyo
- Nomination - Best Music: Shin Hyung

2011 Baeksang Arts Awards

- Best New Actress: Shin Hyun-bin
- Best Screenplay: Yook Sang-hyo

2011 Buil Film Awards

- Best Screenplay: Yook Sang-hyo
