= Ice Girl =

- Also known as: She Returned; She Came Back; She Is Back
- Written by: Moon Eun-ah
- Directed by: Kim Myeong-wook; Lee Jin-seo
- Starring: Kim Hyo-jin; Kim Joo-seung; Kim Nam-jin; Seo Ji-hye
- Country of origin: South Korea
- No. of episodes: 16

Production
- Producer: Jung Sung-hyo
- Running time: Mondays and Tuesdays at 21:55 (KST)

Original release
- Network: Korean Broadcasting System
- Release: June 27 – August 16, 2005

Ice Girl (Korean: 그녀가 돌아왔다; RR: Geunyeoga dorawatda; lit. That Girl Returned) is a 2005 South Korean television series starring Kim Hyo-jin, Kim Joo-seung, Kim Nam-jin and Seo Ji-hye. It aired on KBS2 from June 27 to August 16, 2005 on Mondays and Tuesdays at 21:55 for 16 episodes.

== Plot ==
In 1980, Kim So-ryung suffers a heart attack right before her wedding to her fiancé, Jung Ha-rok. She is brought to her father's hospital to be treated, but her father, Dr. Kim, is unable to save her. He decides to freeze her body as he looks for other ways.

25 years later, she wakes from her frozen state but has no memories of her fiancé, and is given a new identity. After the death of her father from a car crash, she starts living with her ex-fiancé and soon falls in love with his son, Jung Min-jae.

== Cast ==
=== Main characters ===
- Kim Hyo-jin as Kim So-ryung
- Kim Joo-seung as Jung Ha-rok
  - Park Jin-woo as young Ha-rok
- Kim Nam-jin as Jung Min-jae
- Seo Ji-hye as Cha Joo-ha

=== Supporting characters ===
- Jung Wook as Dr. Kim Soo-yeop
- Yoon So-jung as Dr. Oh Jung-hee
- Moon Chun-sik as Supervisor Jo
- Kwon Hyuk-go as President
- Lee Dal-hyung as a supervisor
- Park Soon-chun as Jung Soo-im
