= Lee Bom =

South Korean actress (born 1990)

- Born: Lee Ji-eun; 24 July 1990 (age 36); Daegu, South Korea
- Other name: Yi Bom
- Education: Cheongju University (Bachelor of Arts in Acting)
- Occupation: Actress
- Years active: 2003–present
- Agent: Management Oreum
- Known for: Link: Eat, Love, Kill; The Game: Towards Zero; Girls' Generation 1979

Korean name
- Hangul: 이봄
- RR: I Bom
- MR: I Pom

Lee Bom (Korean: 이봄; born 24 July 1990) is a South Korean actress. She is known for her roles in dramas such as The Game: Towards Zero, Hello Monster, Juvenile Justice, Girls' Generation 1979 and Link: Eat, Love, Kill. She also appeared in movies Spring Bears Love, The Beauty Inside, After My Death, Mourning Grave and Time Renegades.

== Filmography ==
=== Television series ===
Year	Title	Role	Ref.
2004	Sweet Buns	Soo-hee	
2006	There's Light at the Tip of My Fingernails	So-ra	
2007	Surgeon Bong Dal-hee	Ah-jeong	
2015	Hello Monster	Joon-ho's mother	
2016	Happy Home	Bae Sook-nyeo	
2017	Girls' Generation 1979	Park Gwi-ja	
2018	Dear My Room	Da-young	
2020	The Game: Towards Zero	Ji Soo-hyeon	
2022	Juvenile Justice	Gyu-sang's wife	
2022	Link: Eat, Love, Kill	Lee Eun-jeong	
2025	Oh My Ghost Clients	Si-yeon	

=== Film ===
Year	Title		Role
Year	English	Korean	Role
2003	My Teacher, Mr. Kim	선생 김봉두	Choi Ae-soon
2003	Spring Bears Love	봄날의 곰을 좋아하세요?	Jung Hyun-jae
2014	Mourning Grave	소녀괴담	Hye-jung
2015	Lost Flower: Eo Woo Dong	주인없는 꽃: 어우동	Myo-hong
2015	The Beauty Inside	뷰티 인사이드	Lounge girl
2016	Time Renegades	시간이탈자	Dodge ball student
2016	Great Patrioteers	우리 손자 베스트	Mi-seon
2017	Come, Together	컴, 투게더	Slender woman
2018	After My Death	죄 많은 소녀	Da-som
2019	My First Client	어린 의뢰인	Homeroom teacher
2020	The Funeral to Heaven	내 편이 없어	Ga-hee
2021	Unboxing Girl	평평남녀	Hana

=== Music video appearances ===
Year	Title	Artist	Length	Ref.
2013	The Ghost Of The Wind	ZE:A	3:36	
