= Thousand Years of Love =

- Promotional poster
- Also known as: Love of Thousand Years
- Genre: Romance; Drama; Time travel
- Written by: Lee Sun-mi; Kim Ki-ho
- Directed by: Lee Kwan-hee
- Starring: Sung Yu-ri; So Ji-sub; Kim Nam-jin
- Country of origin: South Korea
- Original language: Korean
- No. of episodes: 20

Production
- Production location: Korea
- Production company: Lee Kwan-hee Production

Original release
- Network: SBS TV
- Release: March 22 – May 25, 2003

Thousand Years of Love (Korean: 천년지애; Hanja: 千年之愛; RR: Cheonnyeonjiae) is a 2003 South Korean television series starring Sung Yu-ri, So Ji-sub and Kim Nam-jin. It aired on SBS from March 22 to May 25, 2003 on Saturdays and Sundays at 21:45 for 20 episodes.

== Plot ==
Over a thousand years ago during the Baekje Dynasty, there was a princess unlike any other. Skilled in both arts and athletics, the beautiful Princess Buyeo Ju is beloved by royals and citizens alike. When Baekje is betrayed by the spy Kum-hwa, Buyeo Ju even steals the heart of her kingdom's conqueror, Silla general Kim Yu-seok. But alas, her love lies with her protector, General Guishil Ari. Determined to have the princess, Kim Yu-seok kills Guishil Ari, but Buyeo Ju chooses death over submission. When she jumps off a cliff, however, she is mysteriously time warped into the future. In present-day Korea (2003), Buyeo Ju again meets the two men of her life, reincarnated as aimless but warm-hearted fashion designer Kang In-chul and Japanese tycoon Fujiwara Tatsuji. The two men have no idea about their past lives, but Tatsuji begins to feel a mysterious attraction towards Buyeo Ju. Despite her fear that history will repeat itself, Buyeo Ju finds herself falling for In-chul, in a fateful romance spanning from ancient Korea to modern times.

== Cast ==
- Sung Yu-ri as Princess Buyeo Ju
- So Ji-sub as General Guishil Ari / Kang In-chul
- Kim Nam-jin as General Kim Yu-seok / Fujiwara Tatsuji
- Kim Sa-rang as Kum-hwa / Go Eun-bi
- Lee Mi-young as Chae Yeo-sa, Eun-bi's mother
- Park Chil-yong as Go Bong-su, Eun-bi's father
- Im Chae-moo as Doctor Uhm
- Kwon Ki-sun as Doctor Uhm's wife
- Yang Taek-jo as Tatsuji's housekeeper
- Lee Ki-young as Kim Cheon-chul, gangster boss
- Kim Tae-yeon as Yeo-rang
- Lee Sun-kyun as Pil-ga
- Han Tae-yoon as Sook-hee
- Ha Joo-hee as Junko, Tatsuji's ex-girlfriend

== International broadcast ==
- It aired in Vietnam from April 3, 2004 on HTV7.
