= Yuny Han =

South Korean actress and musician (born 1983)

- Born: Han Tae-youn; October 13, 1983 (age 43); South Korea
- Education: Chung-Ang University; Graduate School of Arts
- Years active: 2000–present
- Agent: Pi Entertainment
- Spouse: Lee Jung-soo (m. 2011)

Korean name
- Hangul: 한태윤
- Hanja: 韓兌侖
- RR: Han Taeyun
- MR: Han T'aeyun

Yuny Han (ユニー・ハン, Yuni Han) (born October 13, 1983) is a South Korean actress and former member of Japanese bands Brandnew Biscuits and Memory Cats.

== Filmography ==
=== TV series ===
- Girls' High School Days (SBS, 2002)
- Ucchan Nanchan no Urinari!! (NTV, 2002)
- Thousand Years of Love (SBS, 2003)
- Ballad of Seodong (SBS, 2005)
- Unstoppable Marriage (KBS2, 2007)
- My Fair Lady (KBS2, 2009)
- The Great Seer (SBS, 2012)

=== Film ===
- Natu Odoru Ninja Densetsu (2000)
- Do Re Mi Fa So La Ti Do (2008)
- Just Friends (2010)
