= Monstrous (TV series) =

2022 South Korean television series

- Promotional poster
- Hangul: 괴이
- RR: Goei
- MR: Koei
- Genre: Thriller; Horror; Supernatural
- Developed by: TVING; Studio Dragon
- Written by: Yeon Sang-ho; Ryoo Yong-jae
- Directed by: Jang Kun-jae
- Starring: Koo Kyo-hwan; Shin Hyun-been
- Music by: Kim Dong-wook
- Country of origin: South Korea
- Original language: Korean
- No. of episodes: 6

Production
- Executive producers: Jang Jeong do; Lee Jeong mok
- Producers: Byun Seung-min; Han Dong-hwan; Jeon Ji-joo
- Camera setup: Single camera
- Running time: 40 minutes
- Production company: Climax Studio

Original release
- Network: TVING
- Release: April 29, 2022

Monstrous (Korean: 괴이; RR: Goei; lit. 'Ghost, Strange') is a South Korean streaming television series starring Koo Kyo-hwan and Shin Hyun-been. The series was made available for streaming on April 29, 2022.

== Synopsis ==
A supernatural thriller story about archaeologists unveiling a strange mystery.

== Cast ==
=== Main ===
- Koo Kyo-hwan as Jeong Ki-hoon.

An eccentric archaeologist who studies strange supernatural phenomena. He is the ex-husband of Lee Soo-jin.

- Shin Hyun-been as Lee Soo-jin. A genius pattern interpreter who faces a terrible disaster

=== Supporting ===
- Kwak Dong-yeon as Kwak Yong-joo
- Nam Da-reum as Han Do-kyung.

Han Seok-hee's son.

- Kim Ji-young as Han Seok-hee

The police chief.

- Park Ho-san as Kwon Jong-soo.

The governor of Jinyang-gun, where disaster struck.

- Park So-yi as Ha-yeong
- Jo Hyun-woo
- Dong Hyun-bae as Kim Soon-kyung

A police officer and assistant who works with Han Seok-hee.

- Jo Sang-ki as Il Ju-nim

== Production ==
On March 9, 2022, it was confirmed that the drama would premiere at the Cannes International Series Festival 2022 from April 1 to April 6, 2022.

It aired on OCN from August 14, 2022, to August 28, 2022.

== Ratings ==
Average TV viewership ratings (nationwide)
Ep.	Original broadcast date	Average audience share (Nielsen Korea)
1	August 14, 2022	0.811%
2	August 14, 2022	0.968%
3	August 21, 2022	0.487%
4	August 21, 2022	0.529%
5	August 28, 2022	0.504%
6	August 28, 2022	0.556%
Average		0.643%
In the table above, the red numbers represent the lowest ratings and the blue numbers represent the highest ratings.
