= Spring Bears Love =

2003 South Korean movie

- Hangul: 봄날의 곰을 좋아하세요?
- RR: Bomnarui gomeul joahaseyo?
- MR: Pomnarŭi komŭl choahaseyo?
- Directed by: Yi Yong
- Written by: Hwang Jo-yoon; Yi Yong
- Produced by: Son Ju-yeon
- Starring: Bae Doona; Kim Nam-jin; Yoon Jong-sin
- Cinematography: Park Ki-woong
- Music by: Yun Jong-shin
- Distributed by: Tube Entertainment
- Release date: 24 October 2003
- Running time: 98 minutes
- Country: South Korea
- Language: Korean

Spring Bears Love (Korean: 봄날의 곰을 좋아하세요?; lit. 'Do You Like Spring Bears?') is a 2003 South Korean film directed by Yong Yi.

== Plot summary ==
A young woman named Hyun-chae is on train looking through an art book. As she turns the pages, she discovers a written message underneath a picture of bears playing together in the springtime. She reads:

I like you so much.

Like a bear in springtime, I know your secrets

... you're like a lovely bear.

This is just the beginning of my love for you.

Next book is Gustave Caillebette 'Young Man at His Window.

Hyun-chae is an unlucky girl who has trouble finding love. Born with bad manners, she is unable to keep a guy for very long. Throughout her life, she has been unsuccessful with love, but goes on through life with her bad manners and pure honesty.

Her father, an alcoholic, a chain-smoker, and a writer, often counts on Hyun-chae to bring him art books from the library, saying that they help him think better. Hyun-chae, desperate as she is to fall in love, fails to see that her best friend from childhood, Dong-ha came back from the military to be with her. Instead, Hyun-chae becomes obsessed with the man that has written the love notes inside the art books, believing that they are meant for her. With this thought in mind, she seeks out the writer with a determined state of mind, believing that every man she meets could possibly be this mere stranger.

== Cast ==
- Bae Doona as Jeong Hyun-chae
- Yoon Ji-hye as Mi-ran
- Oh Kwang-rok as Hyun-chae's father
- Kim Nam-jin as Lee Dong-ha
- Lee Bom as Jung Hyun-jae
- Yoon Jong-shin as Ji-seok
- Lee Eol as Vincent
