= Kim Nam-jin =

South Korean actor (born 1976)

- Born: August 1, 1976 (age 50); Seogwipo, South Korea
- Education: Cheonan University - Piano
- Occupation: Actor
- Years active: 1996–1999, 2001–2013
- Agent: H8 Company

Korean name
- Hangul: 김남진
- Hanja: 金男眞
- RR: Gim Namjin
- MR: Kim Namjin

Kim Nam-jin (Korean: 김남진; born August 1, 1976) is a South Korean actor. Kim began his entertainment career as a model, having walked the runway for Jang Kwang-hyo's Seoul Fashion Artists Association show in 1996 and appeared in advertisements for casual wear brand Storm in 1997. He began acting in 2002, and has since played leading roles in the romantic comedy film Spring Bears Love (2003), and several television dramas, including Ice Girl (2005), New Wise Mother, Good Wife (2007), Fly High (2007), and Don't Be Swayed (2008).

== Filmography ==
=== Film ===
Year	Title	Role	Notes
2002	Lovers' Concerto	Seok-jin	
2003	Spring Bears Love	Lee Dong-ha	
2007	Shadows in the Palace	Lee Hyung-ik	
2007	Fantastic Parasuicides	Police officer	segment: "Fly Away, Chicken!"
2012	Cine Note		short film
2013	Behind the Camera		
2013	If You Were Me 6	Owner of lotto room (cameo)	segment: "Bong-gu on Delivery"

=== Television series ===
Year	Title	Role	Network
2003	Thousand Years of Love	General Kim Yu-seok/Fujiwara Tatsuji	SBS
2003	Merry Go Round	Kang Woo-sub	MBC
2004	First Love of a Royal Prince	Cha Seung-hyun	MBC
2004	Tropical Nights in December	Park Jung-woo	MBC
2005	Ice Girl	Jung Min-jae	KBS2
2007	Mermaid Story	Lee Min-seok	tvN
2007	New Wise Mother, Good Wife	Park Seok-du	MBC
2007	Ground Zero	Lee Joo-hyun	MBC
2007	Fly High	James O'Neill	SBS
2008	Don't Be Swayed	Han Kang-pil	MBC

=== Music video appearances ===
Year	Song title	Artist
2004	"Timeless"	SG Wannabe
2008	"Hateful"	SeeYa
2011	"Goodbye Baby"	Miss A

== Theater ==
Year	Title	Role
2011	Kisaragi Micky Zzang	Riemoto

== Awards and nominations ==
Year	Award	Category	Nominated work	Result
2003	24th Blue Dragon Film Awards	Best New Actor	Spring Bears Love	Nominated
2003	SBS Drama Awards	New Star Award	Thousand Years of Love	Won
