= Milk (South Korean group) =

South Korean girl group (2001–2003)

MILK
- Origin: South Korea
- Genre: K-pop
- Years active: 2001–2003
- Label: BM Entertainment
- Past members: Park Hee-von; Kim Bo-mi; Bae Yu-mi; Seo Hyun-jin

M.I.L.K. (Korean: 밀크, acronym for Made In Lovely Kin) was a South Korean girl group formed by BM Entertainment, subsidiary of SM Entertainment. The group debuted on December 17, 2001, with the album With Freshness. In 2003, Bae Yu-mi departed from the group, which led to its disbandment. The members transitioned to solo acting careers.

== Background ==
It took two years for the group to be formed. The group debuted with their first album With Freshness on December 17, 2001. The group was managed under B.M entertainment, and fan club was called "Milky Way". "Into the New World" was expected to be the title song for their planned second album but was cancelled and instead went to Girls' Generation.

== Past members ==
- Park Hee-von
- Kim Bo-mi
- Bae Yu-mi
- Seo Hyun-jin

== Discography ==
=== Studio albums ===
| Title | Album details |
|---|---|
| With Freshness | Released: December 17, 2001; Label: SM Entertainment; Formats: CD, cassette; Track listing: 1. "Crystal"; 2. "Come to Me"; 3. "Sad Letter"; 4. "Blind Love"; 5. "All My Love For You"; 6. "I Want You"; 7. "Secret"; 8. "Reason"; 9. "Wish"; 10. "She Never..."; 11. "Stay with me" 12. "Good Time"; 13. "Crystal" (Instrumental) |

The album was produced by Moon Hee-joon. It was among the earliest works the producing team Sweetune participated in.

=== Singles ===
| Title | Year | Album |
|---|---|---|
| "Come to Me" | 2001 | With Freshness |
| "Crystal" | 2002 | With Freshness |
| "Sad Letter" | 2002 | With Freshness |

== Awards ==
Name of the award ceremony, year presented, award category, nominee(s) of the award, and the result of the nomination
| Award ceremony | Year | Category | Nominee / Work | Result | Ref. |
|---|---|---|---|---|---|
| Mnet Music Video Festival | 2002 | Best New Group | "Come to Me" | Nominated | |
