= The Ugly (2025 film) =

2025 film by Yeon Sang-ho

- Theatrical release poster
- Hangul: 얼굴
- Lit.: Face
- RR: Eolgul
- MR: Ŏlgul
- Directed by: Yeon Sang-ho
- Screenplay by: Yeon Sang-ho
- Based on: The Ugly by Yeon Sang-ho
- Produced by: Yang Yoomin Hailey
- Starring: Park Jeong-min; Kwon Hae-hyo; Shin Hyun-been; Im Seong-jae; Han Ji-hyun
- Cinematography: Pyo Sang-woo
- Edited by: Park Ju-ae
- Music by: Chai Min-joo
- Production company: Wow Point
- Distributed by: Megabox Plus M
- Release dates: September 9, 2025 (TIFF); September 11, 2025 (South Korea)
- Running time: 102 minutes
- Country: South Korea
- Language: Korean
- Budget: ₩200 million (~$143,600)
- Box office: $7.8 million

The Ugly (Korean: 얼굴) is a 2025 South Korean mystery thriller film written and directed by Yeon Sang-ho. Based on director Yeon's 2018 graphic novel of the same name, the film stars Park Jeong-min in dual roles as Im Young-gyu, a blind, extraordinarily skilled artisan, and his son, Im Dong-hwan. When a journalist portrayed by Han Ji-hyun makes a documentary on Young-gyu, she and Dong-hwan investigate Dong-hwan's long-dead mother, of whom he never knew anything. The cast also includes Kwon Hae-hyo as present-day Young-gyu, alongside Im Seong-jae and Han Ji-hyun.

The film premiered at the Toronto International Film Festival on September 9, 2025. It was released in South Korea on September 11, 2025, by Plus M Entertainment.

== Plot ==
Lim Yeong-gyu is a blind elderly seal-engraving master celebrated nationwide as a "living miracle" for producing beautiful work, with his son, Dong-hwan, handling most of the business' promotional aspects. As a television documentary led by Su-jin profiles Yeong-gyu's life and artistry, Dong-hwan learns that his mother, Jung Young-hee, whom he knew nothing of besides that she had abandoned the family when he was a baby, was in fact dead, her skeletal remains discovered at a construction site where they had been buried for nearly forty years.

Dong-hwan and Su-jin become interested in learning more about Young-hee, who is described by old acquaintances as a woman villainous of character and incredibly ugly physically, nicknamed "Dung Ogre" and both reviled and mocked for her ugliness. Conversely, her story reveals a brave and kind-hearted woman, whom after discovering that a co-worker at the garment factory she worked at had been raped by Young-hee and Yeong-gyu's tyrannous chief Baek Ju-sang, confronted him, only to be fired and further abused by both co-workers and the rape victim herself, who resented Young-hee making the rape known. When Dong-hwan and Su-jin meet Baek in present times, he reveals that when he sent men to beat up Young-hee for speaking out, they found Yeong-gyu carrying and getting rid of her dead body, unaware that anyone was watching. An upset Dong-hwan takes away the footage Su-jin has recorded, but decides to face his father one-on-one.

When his son asks, Yeong-gyu admits to having killed his wife. He reveals how society's cruelty shaped his worldview through lifelong humiliation and resentment, leading him to endure constant mockery and avoid upsetting the social order. When he and Young-hee became close, their co-workers repeatedly told Dong-hwan that she was gorgeous and that he was a lucky man; however, the realization only after they were married with child that those words had been mockery all along turned him bitter, with his anger directed towards his wife, whom he felt deceived him. Although previously unaware of any of the issues Young-hee faced with Baek, Yeong-gyu was eventually invited by Baek, who made him drunk, told him that his wife had been troublesome, and further humiliated him. That same evening, furious that she was now hindering his relationship with his boss, Yeong-gyu strangled Young-hee to death in a fit of drunken rage, later disposing of the body.

Dong-hwan meets Su-jin to give her recordings back but notes that he has deleted parts of it, implying that he has elected to conceal his father's crime and protect his public image. (Note: it is noted in the film that due to expired statutes of limitation, Yeong-gyu would not have been legally liable for killing Young-hee.) Disappointed with him, Su-jin hints that Dong-hwan is quite similar to his murderous father and leaves after giving him what was believed not to exist: a photo of his mother, tucked away in Baek's collection. Left alone, Dong-hwan unveils the picture, realizing that his mother never looked nearly as hideous as others painted her to be, showing how distorted society's definitions of ugliness can be.

== Cast ==
- Park Jeong-min as Lim Dong-hwan
- Park Jeong-min also portrays the younger version of Lim Yeong-gyu, Dong-hwan's father
- Kwon Hae-hyo as Lim Yeong-gyu
- Shin Hyun-been as Jung Young-hee
- Im Seong-jae as Baek Ju-sang
- Han Ji-hyun as Kim Su-jin

== Production ==
The film was made with a production cost of ₩200 million. Actors Kwon Hae-hyo and Shin Hyun-bin, both of whom have previously collaborated with director Yeon Sang-ho, joined about 20 crew members for a three-week shoot that commenced in late July 2024. As part of Yeon's experimental low-budget approach, Park Jeong-min appeared in the film without receiving an appearance fee. In addition, the production team minimized expenses by foregoing location filming in favor of hastily built sets.

== Release ==
The Ugly had its world premiere at the 2025 Toronto International Film Festival on September 9, 2025 in Special Presentations.

In October 2024, the film was presented at the Asian Contents & Film Market (ACFM), which is held in Busan, South Korea, in conjunction with the Busan International Film Festival.

The film was released on September 11, 2025 in South Korean theaters by Plus M Entertainment after its premiere at the festival.

The film is pre-sold to 157 countries worldwide, and is set to be released starting with North America and Taiwan on the 26 September.

It was screened in LEAFF Official Selection of the 10th London East Asian Film Festival on October 26, 2025.

== Reception ==
=== Box office ===
The film was released on September 11, 2025 on 940 screens. It opened at the top recording 35,020 viewers on its opening day at the Korean box office. The film surpassed one million viewers on October 5, 2025. It recorded 1,000,005 cumulative viewers to achieve the milestone.

As of October 18, 2025, the film has grossed US$7,694,161 from 1,071,202 admissions.

=== Critical response ===
The review-aggregation website Rotten Tomatoes gives the film a score of 53%, with an average of 5.6/10, based on 30 reviews from critics. On Metacritic, the film received mixed reviews with a weighted average of 50 out of 100, based on 5 reviews.

Kang Hyo-jin's review of the film for SPOTV News highlights the film's relentless energy and gripping narrative, which maintains immersion from start to finish. She praised the director Yeon Sang-ho for making a quality film on low budget, writing, "director Yeon Sang-ho achieves a seamless quality, as if he were employing alchemy." According to Kang, the standout element is the dual-role performances by Park Jeong-min and Kwon Hae-hyo, who portray different versions of the character Im Young-gyu with striking clarity and emotional depth. Kang praised their climactic father-son dialogue writing, "The father-son dialogue near the end, in particular, is captivating and the two actors' passionate performances sweep the audience off their feet." Concluding the review, Kang described it as mesmerizing and emotionally charged. In her opinion, the final scene leaves a lasting impression that is expected to resonate with audiences and spark discussion among film enthusiasts.

Tim Grierson reviewing for ScreenDaily at TIFF calls it a "calibrated thriller" that blends murder mystery with deeper themes of beauty and self-worth. He praised Yeon Sang-ho's shift from genre spectacle to a more intimate, character-driven story, noting the clever use of flashbacks and the emotional weight of Lim Dong-hwan's search for the truth. Steven Scaife of Slant Magazine rated the film 2 out of 4 stars and said that "The film plays a long game with audiences that frustrates far more than it illuminates."

Brian Tallerico of RogerEbert.com, who gave the film a score of 1.5 out of 4 stars, described it as a "dour, depressing drama, a movie that gets so lost in its lethargic structure that it feels like a chore."

== Accolades ==
Award ceremony	Year	Category	Recipient(s)	Result	Ref.
Baeksang Arts Awards	2026	Best Screenplay	Yeon Sang-ho	Nominated	
Baeksang Arts Awards	2026	Best Actor	Park Jeong-min	Won	
Baeksang Arts Awards	2026	Best Supporting Actress	Shin Hyun-been	Nominated	
Baeksang Arts Awards	2026	Best Technical Achievement	Lee Mok-won	Nominated	
Blue Dragon Film Awards	2025	Best Film	The Ugly	Nominated	
Blue Dragon Film Awards	2025	Best Director	Yeon Sang-ho	Nominated	
Blue Dragon Film Awards	2025	Best Actor	Park Jeong-min	Nominated	
Blue Dragon Film Awards	2025	Best Supporting Actor	Kwon Hae-hyo	Nominated	
Blue Dragon Film Awards	2025	Best Supporting Actress	Shin Hyun-been	Nominated	
Blue Dragon Film Awards	2025	Best Screenplay	Yeon Sang-ho	Nominated	
Blue Dragon Film Awards	2025	Best Editing	Park Ju-ae	Nominated	
Blue Dragon Film Awards	2025	Best Cinematography and Lighting	Pyo Sang-woo, Song Hyun-seok	Nominated	
Blue Dragon Film Awards	2025	Best Art Direction	Lee Mok-won	Nominated	
Blue Dragon Film Awards	2025	Technical Award	Jo Tae-hee (Make-up)	Nominated	
Buil Film Awards	2026	Best Screenplay	Yeon Sang-ho	Nominated	
Buil Film Awards	2026	Best Supporting Actress	Shin Hyun-been	Nominated	
Chunsa Film Art Awards	2025	Best Supporting Actor	Kwon Hae-hyo	Won	
Director's Cut Awards	2026	Best Director (Film)	Yeon Sang-ho	Nominated	
Director's Cut Awards	2026	Best Screenplay (Film)	Yeon Sang-ho	Nominated	
Director's Cut Awards	2026	Best Actor (Film)	Kwon Hae-hyo	Nominated	
Director's Cut Awards	2026	Best Actor (Film)	Park Jeong-min	Nominated	
Golden Cinematography Awards	2026	Best Supporting Actress	Shin Hyun-been	Won	
Korean Association of Film Critics Awards	2025	Best Actor	Park Jeong-min	Won	
Wildflower Film Awards	2026	Best Actor	Kwon Hae-hyo	Won	
