= Ha Joo-hee =

South Korean film actress (born 1982)

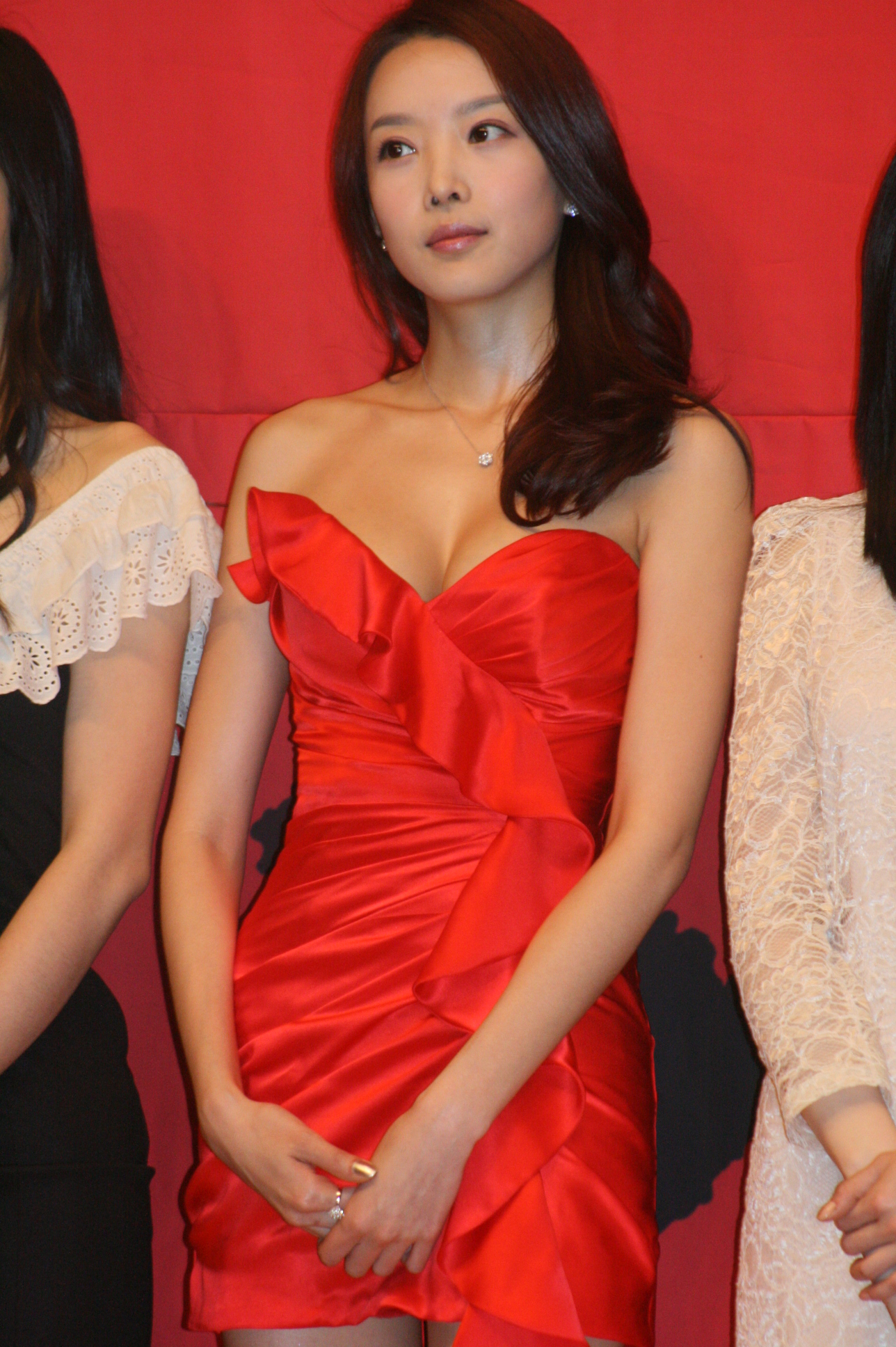
- Ha at the Bad Guy press conference in 2010
- Born: September 18, 1982 (age 44); Seoul, South Korea
- Education: Sungkyunkwan University (Art of Acting)
- Occupations: Actress; model
- Years active: 2001–present
- Agent: Pan Entertainment

Korean name
- Hangul: 하주희
- RR: Ha Juhui
- MR: Ha Chuhŭi

Ha Joo-hee (Korean: 하주희, born September 18, 1982) is a South Korean actress and model. Ha debuted as a model in the teen magazine Cindy the Perky in September 2001. She debuted as an actress after appearing as Junko in the 2003 South Korean TV series, Thousand Years of Love.

== Filmography ==
=== Film ===
Year	Title	Role	Notes	Ref.
2003	First Love Rally	Ji-won		
2005	Red Eye		Cameo	
2015	Love Clinic	Maeng In-young		

=== Television series ===
Year	Title	Role	Notes	Ref.
2003	Thousand Years of Love	Junko		
2004	Age of Heroes	Yoon Jung-ae		
2004	Love is All Around			
2005	MBC Best Theatre – Stockholm Syndrome	Na-young		
2006	Soul Mate			
2006	Great Inheritance	Jin Yoo-jung		
2006	Couple or Trouble			
2007	Drama City: "You're Ugly"	Soo-in		
2008	Aquarius	Myung Eun-young		
2008	All About My Family	Cha Jung-yoon		
2010	Bad Guy	Choi Hye-joo		
2012	Take Care of Us, Captain	Lee Joo-ri		
2012	Oh My God x2	Ha Joo-hee		
2013	Ruby Ring	Seo Jin-hee		
2016	The Dearest Lady	Soo-ryun		
2016	The Vampire Detective			
2018	Children of Nobody	Park Ji-hye	Cameo	

== Awards and nominations ==
Name of the award ceremony, year presented, category, nominee of the award, and the result of the nomination
Award ceremony	Year	Category	Nominee / Work	Result	Ref.
Korea Culture and Entertainment Awards	2018	Excellence in Acting	Ha Joo-he	Won	
