= Kim Jung-tae =

South Korean actor (born 1972)

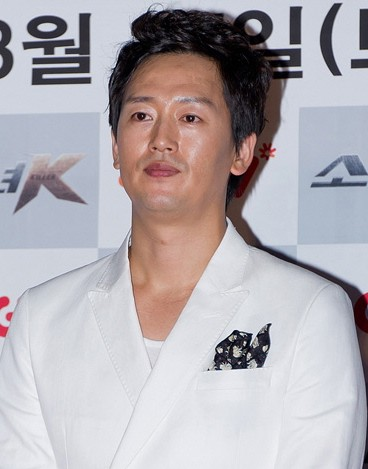
- Kim in August 2011
- Born: Kim Tae-wook; January 17, 1973 (age 53); Busan, South Korea
- Education: Kyungsung University - Theater and Film
- Occupation: Actor
- Years active: 1999–present
- Agent: S.TREE Entertainment
- Spouse: Jeon Yeo-jin (m. 2009)
- Children: Kim Ji-hoo; Kim Si-hyun

Korean name
- Hangul: 김태욱
- RR: Gim Taeuk
- MR: Kim T'aeuk

Stage name
- Hangul: 김정태
- RR: Gim Jeongtae
- MR: Kim Chŏngt'ae

Kim Jung-tae (born Kim Tae-wook on December 13, 1972) is a South Korean actor. He is best known for his supporting roles on film and television.

== Career ==
He made his acting debut in 1999 with the film The Uprising under his birth name Kim Tae-wook. In 2006 he started going by his current stage name Kim Jung-tae. Best known as a supporting actor, Kim was often typecast in antagonistic roles, mostly as gangsters, loan sharks, and other such villains.

Kim drew praise in 2010 when he played the leading role in the 25-minute short film Remember O Goddess, a film noir involving memory loss. That same year, audiences first got a taste of Kim's comical side in He's on Duty.

In 2014, he and his son Kim Ji-hoo appeared on The Return of Superman, a reality show that follows celebrity fathers who take over caring for their children for a few days while their wives are away. They were originally guest stars in his friend Jang Hyun-sung's segment on episodes 20 and 21, but netizens liked Ji-hoo for his bright and happy personality and asked to see more of him. On episode 21, Kim said that he calls Ji-hoo by the nickname "Yakkung" because while playing peekaboo (kkakkung in Korean) with him as a baby, Ji-hoo would not answer to kkakkung, but to yakkung. They officially became cast members on episode 25.

Kim was later heavily criticized for bringing Ji-hoo while publicly campaigning for Na Dong-yeon of the Saenuri Party, who ran for Yangsan city mayor in South Gyeongsang Province in the June 4, 2014 local elections. His wife, Jeon Yeo-jin responded that the family was just on a "picnic," and that she and her son had just stopped by to say hello to Na, who is an old friend of her husband. Yet due to mounting criticism that a child had seemingly been exploited for political means, Kim's agency announced a week after the incident that Kim and his son had chosen to leave the program The Return of Superman.

== Personal life ==
In 2009, Kim married his girlfriend of 19 years, Jeon Yeo-jin; the two have known each other since they were teenagers. Jeon has a doctorate in Engineering and teaches at Pukyong National University. The couple currently reside in Busan with their two children, Kim Ji-hoo and Kim Si-hyun.

Kim suffers from cirrhosis and almost died from it on multiple occasions. He was cared for by his mother, who ultimately died of the same disease (which is not infectious, but may be hereditary).

If he had not become an actor, Kim has said that he would most likely have become a poet. He has penned over 200 poems since the age of 17 and plans to publish them in a book.

== Filmography ==
=== Film ===
- Air Murder (2022)
- Chasing (2016)
- Salut d'Amour (2015)
- The Trip Around the World (2015)
- Granny's Got Talent (2015)
- Shoot Me in the Heart (2015)
- Mourning Grave (2014)
- Queen of the Night (2013)
- Tough as Iron (2013)
- Mr. Go (2013)
- How to Use Guys with Secret Tips (2013)
- Miracle in Cell No. 7 (2013)
- Man on the Edge (2013)
- The Neighbor (2012)
- Superstar (2012)
- All About My Wife (2012)
- The Scent (2012)
- Wonderful Radio (2012)
- S.I.U. (2011)
- My Secret Partner (2011)
- Officer of the Year (2011)
- He's on Duty (2010)
- Remember O Goddess (short film, 2010)
- Hearty Paws 2 (2010)
- I Came from Busan (2010)
- City of Fathers (2009)
- Insadong Scandal (2009)
- Open City (2008)
- Sunflower (2006)
- Never to Lose (2005)
- Duelist (2005)
- My Brother (2004)
- Fighter in the Wind (2004)
- Windstruck (2004)
- Clementine (2004)
- Low Life (2004)
- Mutt Boy (2003)
- The Classic (2003)
- Ardor (2002)
- Bet on My Disco (2002)
- The Exam Is Over (short film, 2001)
- Friend (2001)
- Black Honeymoon (2000)
- The Bird Who Stops in the Air (1999)
- Rush (1999)
- The Uprising (1999)

=== Television series ===
- Jinxed at First (KBS, 2022) - Cameo
- Sponsor (IHQ, 2022)
- Show Window: The Queen's House (Channel A, 2021–2022)
- The Time (MBC, 2018)
- Bad Thief, Good Thief (MBC, 2017)
- The Rebel (MBC, 2017)
- Oh My Venus (KBS2, 2015–2016)
- Goddess of Marriage (SBS, 2013)
- Dream High 2 (KBS2, 2012)
- Drama Special "Human Casino" (KBS2, 2011)
- Girl K (CGV, 2011)
- Can't Lose (MBC, 2011)
- Miss Ripley (MBC, 2011)
- Sign (SBS, 2011) (guest appearance, ep 11–13)
- Bad Guy (SBS, 2010)
- Swallow the Sun (SBS, 2009)
- Alibi Inc. (Dramax, 2008)
- Robber (SBS, 2008)
- H.I.T (MBC, 2007)
- Dr. Kkang (MBC, 2006)

=== Variety show ===
- Mr. House Husband (KBS2, 2016–2017)
- The Return of Superman (KBS2, 2014)
- Nine to Six 2 (MBC Every 1, 2014 – present)
- Funny TV Rollercoaster: Hongdae Jung-tae (tvN, 2011)
- King of Mask Singer (MBC, 2015) (Episode 33, Contestant with the stage name "Wandering Poet Kim Sattgat")
- Real Men (MBC, 2016) (Cast member, Navy NCO special)

== Discography ==
- "잊어줘 (Forget)" (track from Girl K OST, 2011)
- "날개 (Wings)", "찬찬찬 (Chan Chan Chan)" (digital single, 2011)

== Awards ==
- 2013 21st Korean Culture and Entertainment Awards: Excellence Award, Actor in Film
- 2011 MBC Drama Awards: PD Award (Miss Ripley, Can't Lose)
