= Confession (South Korean TV series) =

2019 South Korean television series

- Promotional poster
- Hangul: 자백
- RR: Jabaek
- MR: Chabaek
- Genre: Legal drama
- Created by: Studio Dragon
- Written by: Im Hee-Cheol
- Directed by: Kim Cheol-Kyu; Yun Hyeon-gi
- Starring: Lee Jun-ho; Yoo Jae-myung; Shin Hyun-been
- Music by: Kim Joon-seok; Jeong Se-rin
- Country of origin: South Korea
- Original language: Korean
- No. of episodes: 16

Production
- Executive producer: Min Hyun-il
- Camera setup: Single camera
- Running time: 60 minutes
- Production company: Ace Factory

Original release
- Network: tvN
- Release: March 23 – May 12, 2019

Confession (Korean: 자백; RR: Jabaek) is a 2019 South Korean television series starring Lee Jun-ho, Yoo Jae-myung and Shin Hyun-been. It aired on tvN from March 23 to May 12, 2019.

== Synopsis ==
Choi Do-hyun becomes a lawyer in order to clear his father's name after he has been wrongly accused of murder.

== Cast ==
=== Main ===
- Lee Jun-ho as Choi Do-hyun
- Yoo Jae-myung as Gi Choon-ho
- Shin Hyun-been as Ha Yoo-ri
- Nam Gi-ae as Madame Jin

=== Supporting ===
==== People around Choi Do-hyun ====
- Choi Kwang-il as Choi Pil-su
- Lee Ki-hyuk as Lee Hyun-joon

==== People around Gi Choon-ho ====
- Jung Hee-tae as Detective Seo
- Jang Jae-ho as Detective Lee
- Jeon Do-hyun as Kim Dae-seok

==== Others ====
- Moon Sung-keun as Cho Myung-geun
- Song Young-chang as Oh Taek-jin
- Yoo Sung-joo as Ji Chang-ryul
- Kim Jung-gi as Yang In-beom
- Kim Young-hoon as Park Si-kang
- Choi Dae-hoon as Secretary Hwang
- Kim Jung-hwa as Jenny Song
- Ryu Kyung-soo as Han Jong-goo
- Song Yoo-hyun as Cho Gyeong-seon
- Jeong Gi-seop as Cha Seung-hu
- Kim Seong-hun as Sung Jun-sik
- Yoon Kyung-ho as Heo Jae-man
- Tae In-ho

== Production ==
The first script reading of the cast was held on January 5, 2019.

== Original soundtrack ==
Confession OST

Soundtrack album by Various artists
- Recorded: 2019
- Genre: Soundtrack
- Languages: Korean; English
- Labels: MUSIC&NEW; Vlending

=== Part 1 ===
Released on April 7, 2019
No.	Title	Lyrics	Music	Artist	Length
1.	"Let Me Hear It" (들려줘)	Kang Ji-won, Basick	Kang Ji-won	Song Ji-eun, Basick	3:54
2.	"Let Me Hear It" (Inst.)		Kang Ji-won		3:54
Total length:					7:48

=== Part 2 ===
Released on April 14, 2019
No.	Title	Lyrics	Music	Artist	Length
1.	"The End"	Kang Ji-won	Kang Ji-won	Jungin	3:50
2.	"The End" (Inst.)		Kang Ji-won		3:50
Total length:					7:40

=== Part 3 ===
Released on April 21, 2019
No.	Title	Lyrics	Music	Artist	Length
1.	"Reason: It's You"	Movie Man & Master Chung	Movie Man & Master Chung	Yoari	3:20
2.	"Reason: It's You" (Inst.)		Movie Man & Master Chung		3:20
Total length:					6:40

== Ratings ==
Confession : South Korea viewers per episode (thousands)

Season	Episode number																Average
Season	1	2	3	4	5	6	7	8	9	10	11	12	13	14	15	16	Average
1	1125	1217	898	1303	833	1150	852	1134	895	1174	868	1035	734	1032	962	1313	1033

Source: Audience measurement performed nationwide by Nielsen Media Research.

Average TV viewership ratings
Ep.	Original broadcast date	Average audience share (AGB Nielsen)	
Ep.	Original broadcast date	Nationwide	Seoul
1	March 23, 2019	4.569%	4.704%
2	March 24, 2019	5.386%	6.461%
3	March 30, 2019	4.501%	4.913%
4	March 31, 2019	5.573%	6.176%
5	April 6, 2019	4.027%	4.761%
6	April 7, 2019	5.458%	6.462%
7	April 13, 2019	4.079%	4.661%
8	April 14, 2019	5.425%	6.419%
9	April 20, 2019	3.846%	4.846%
10	April 21, 2019	5.594%	6.421%
11	April 27, 2019	3.846%	4.347%
12	April 28, 2019	5.122%	6.047%
13	May 4, 2019	3.378%	3.759%
14	May 5, 2019	4.841%	5.686%
15	May 11, 2019	4.849%	5.738%
16	May 12, 2019	6.275%	7.030%
Average		4.798%	5.527%
In the table above, the blue numbers represent the lowest ratings and the red numbers represent the highest ratings.; This drama aired on a cable channel/pay TV which normally has a relatively smaller audience compared to free-to-air TV/public broadcasters (KBS, SBS, MBC and EBS).

== Awards and nominations ==
Year	Award	Category	Recipient	Result	Ref.
2019	12th Korea Drama Awards	Best New Actress	Shin Hyun-been	Nominated	
