= Shin Kang-woo =

South Korean actor and singer

Shin Kang-Woo
- Born: April 26, 1992 (age 34); Daejeon, South Korea
- Education: Hansei University – Department of Performing Arts
- Occupations: Actor; singer
- Years active: 2015–present
- Agent: MCMC

Korean name
- Hangul: 신강우
- RR: Sin Gangu
- MR: Sin Kangu

Shin Kang-Woo (born April 26, 1992) is a South Korean actor and singer.

== Filmography ==
=== Films ===
Year	Title	Role
2015	Chasing	Shin Jae-Kwon

=== Television series ===
Year	Title	Role	Network
2012	The Sons	Store staff (guest)	MBC
2018	Misty	Park Sung-jae	JTBC

=== Music video appearances ===
Year	Song title	Artist
2015	"Pride and Prejudice"	Zico
2016	"The Day Will Come"	Psy
