= Park Hee-von =

South Korean actress (born 1983)

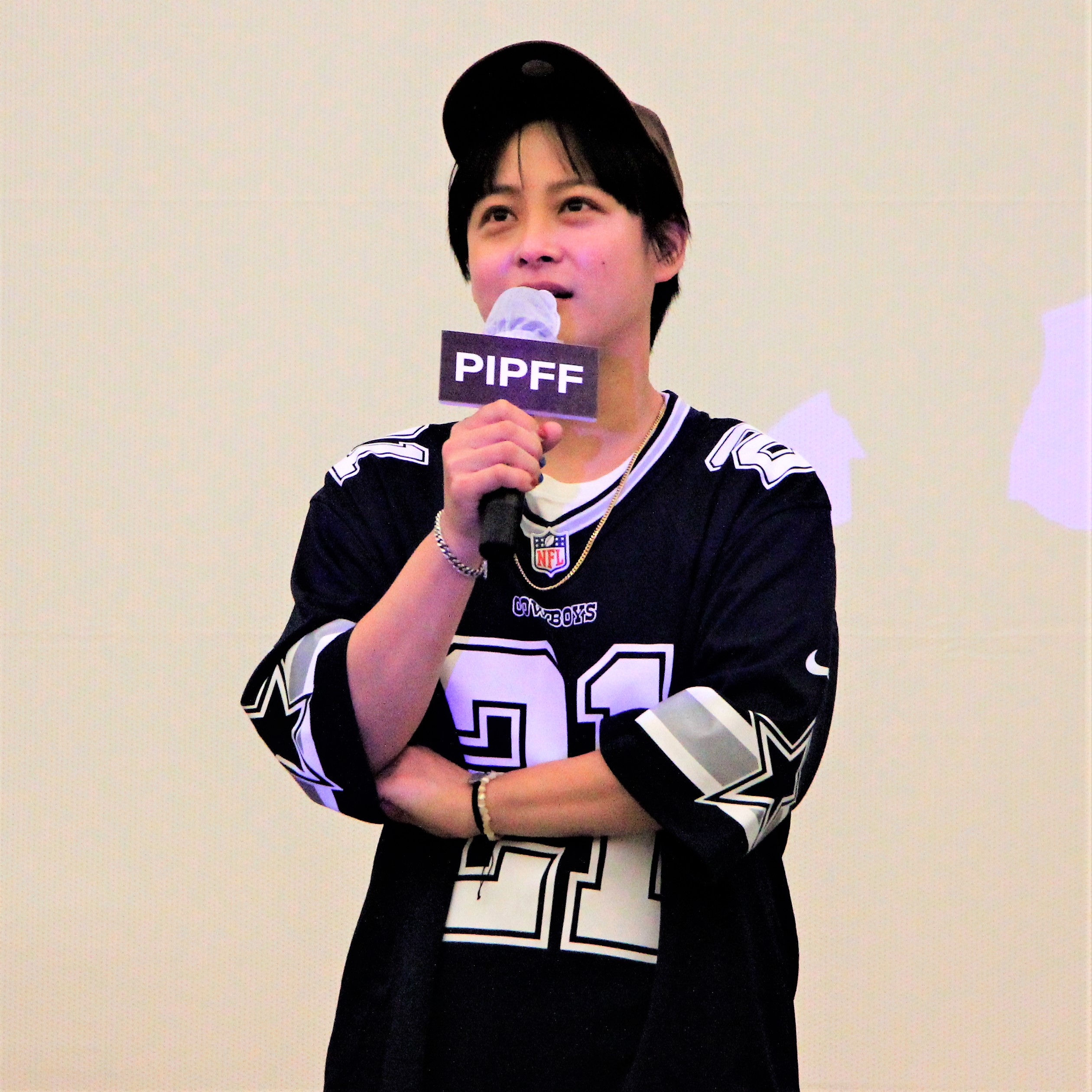
- Park at the 4th PyeongChang International Peace Film Festival, 2022
- Born: Park Jae-young; May 11, 1983 (age 43); Seoul, South Korea
- Other names: Jaeyoung, Park Hee-bon
- Education: Sejong University
- Occupations: Actress; singer; TV host
- Years active: 2001–present
- Agent: Noon Company
- Spouse: Yoon Se-yeong (m. 2016)
- Musical career
- Genres: K-pop (gayo and ballad)
- Instrument: Vocals
- Years active: 2001–present
- Labels: BM; SM; Sonic Stone
- Formerly of: M.I.L.K.; SM Town

Korean name
- Hangul: 박재영
- RR: Bak Jaeyeong
- MR: Pak Chaeyŏng

Stage name
- Hangul: 박희본
- RR: Bak Huibon
- MR: Pak Hŭibon

Park Hee-von (Korean: 박희본; born May 11, 1983), birth name Park Jae-young (박재영), is a South Korean actress and singer. Park made her entertainment debut in 2001 as a member of a girl group named M.I.L.K. under SM Entertainment's short-lived subsidiary BM Entertainment. The quartet released one album titled With Freshness, and disbanded less than two years later. When Park transitioned to acting, she began using the stage name Park Hee-von. Park is best known for starring in independent films and cable TV series.

== Personal life ==
Park and director Yoon Se-yeong got married in a private wedding at the Myeongdong Cathedral in Seoul on June 6, 2016.

== Filmography ==
=== Film ===
Year	Title	Role	Notes/Ref.
2006	Portfolio		short film
2006	Vacation	Young-shim	episode 2
2010	Read My Lips	Gu Hee-bon	
2010	Pitpat Wing Chun	Hee-bon	short film
2010	Grand Prix	Lee Da-som	
2011	The Last Blossom	Wife of Yeon-soo's lover	
2011	Dr. Jump	Jae-young	also credited as screenwriter
2011	The King of Pigs	young Hwang Kyung-min (voice)	animated film
2012	All About My Wife	Female cop at police station (cameo)	
2012	Circle of Crime	Jung Yoo-mi	
2012	Modern Family	Dr. Kim	
2013	Jury	Simultaneous interpreter	short film
2013	Have a Cup of Tea, or See a Film!		short film
2013	Incomplete Life: Prequel	Son Hyo-jin	
2013	Let Me Out	Ah-young	
2013	The Fake	Kim Young-sun (voice)	animated film
2015	Alive	Hyun-kyung	
2016	Like for Likes	Ee-joo's mom	
2016	Will You Be There?	Young Hye-won (cameo)	
2017	One Day	Park Ho-jung	
2024	Project Silence	Mi-ran	

=== Television series ===
Year	Title	Role
2005	Rainbow Romance	Park Hee-bon
2006	Banjun Drama: "Dangerous Love"	Hee-bon
2006	Banjun Drama: "Unforgettable Love"	
2006	Billie Jean, Look at Me	Yoo Bang-hee
2007	Drama City: "Einstein Found Love"	Chae Na-ri
2012	Read My Lips	Gu Hee-bon
2012	Quiz of God 3	Lee Ran
2012	Family	Yeol Hee-bong
2013	Master's Sun	Tae Gong-ri
2014	KBS Drama Special: "The Reason I'm Getting Married"	Kim Ji-won
2014	Doctor Stranger	Dr. Song Jae-hee (cameo)
2014	High School King of Savvy	Female contract weaver (cameo)
2014	You Are My Destiny	Jeon Ji-yeon
2015	The Producers	Baek Jae-hee
2015	Bubble Gum	Hong Yi-seul
2016	Guardian: The Lonely and Great God	Ji Yeon-hee (cameo)
2017	Super Family	Ahn Jeong-min
2017	The Bride of Habaek	Hyung-sik, Yoo Sang-yu's fiancée (cameo)
2017	Argon	Yook Hye-ri
2017	Rain or Shine	Wan-jin
2017	Drama Stage: "Today I Grab the Tambourine Again"	Oh Moon-sook
2018	Familiar Wife	Cha Joo-eun
2019	Secret Boutique	Wi Ye-nam
2021	Sisyphus: The Myth	
2021	Happiness	

=== Web series ===
Year	Title	Role	Notes
2013	The Cravings	Jegal Jae-young	re-released as a movie
2014	Flirty Boy and Girl	Woman No. 5 best friend	
2014	Love Cells	Girlfriend of neighbor's brother	
2018	Top Management	Kang Jae young	

=== Music video appearance ===
Year	Song title	Artist
2000	"Day by Day (ver. 2)"	Fly to the Sky

=== Variety/radio show ===
Year	Title	Notes/Ref.
2003	Oh! Happy Day	Host
2005–2006	Hello Chat	Host
2005–2006	Young Street with Kim Heechul and Park Hee-von	DJ
2006–2007	Show Power Video	Host
2007	Fun TV Heaven	
2011	Style Battle Royal TOP CEO – Season 3	
2015	Let's Eat with Friends	Cast member

== Theater ==
Year	Title	Role
2004	In the Burning Darkness	Doña Pepita
2005	A Streetcar Named Desire	Stella Kowalski

== Discography ==
Album information	Track listing
Twenty Two (스물둘): Single; Artist: Park Hee-von; Released: November 29, 2010; Label: Sonic Stone, SK Comms	Track listing: 1. "스물둘" (Twenty Two); 2. "스물둘" (Twenty Two) (Piano Ver.); 3. "스물둘" (Twenty Two) (Instrumental)
You & I Together: Track from Family OST; Artist: Shim Ji-ho and Park Hee-von ("Bag's Couple"); Released: January 29, 2013; Label: LOEN Entertainment	Track listing: 1. "You & I Together"; 2. "You & I Together" (Instrumental)
Her Rain Boots (그녀의 레인부츠): Track from Flirty Boy and Girl OST; Artist: Park Hee-von, Yoon Jin-wook and Park Jong-hwan; Released: September 16, 2014; Label: Doremi Entertainment, Sixteen Media	Track listing: 1. "그녀의 레인부츠" (Her Rain Boots); 2. "그녀의 레인부츠" (Her Rain Boots) (Instrumental)
