= Revelations (2025 film) =

2025 film by Yeon Sang-ho

- Release poster
- Hangul: 계시록
- Hanja: 啓示錄
- RR: Gyesirok
- MR: Kyesirok
- Directed by: Yeon Sang-ho
- Screenplay by: Yeon Sang-ho; Choi Gyu-seok
- Based on: Revelations by: Yeon Sang-ho; Choi Gyu-seok
- Produced by: Alfonso Cuarón
- Starring: Ryu Jun-yeol; Shin Hyun-been; Shin Min-jae
- Production companies: Wow Point; Esperanto Filmoj
- Distributed by: Netflix
- Release date: March 21, 2025
- Running time: 122 minutes
- Country: South Korea
- Language: Korean

Revelations (Korean: 계시록) is a 2025 South Korean mystery thriller film written and directed by Yeon Sang-ho and co-writer Choi Gyu-seok, based on their own webtoon of the same name. Produced under Wow Point, it stars Ryu Jun-yeol and Shin Hyun-been. The film was released on Netflix on March 21, 2025.

== Plot ==
Sung Min-chan, the head pastor of a small church, recently learns that his wife has been having an affair and has also lost the opportunity to become the lead bishop of a newly established megachurch. Meanwhile, Yang-rae, a child abuse convict on parole, comes to Min-chan's church to prey on one of its young members. Min-chan grows suspicious of Yang-rae after seeing his ankle monitor. After the church session, Min-chan's wife frantically calls him to say their son has gone missing. Min-chan researches Yang-rae's background and believes that he is involved.

Min-chae stakes out Yang-rae's home and watches him prepare digging tools. He follows Yang-rae's van to a secluded forest and confronts him, but discovers that the van is empty. While walking back to his car, he notices that Yang-rae's ankle monitor is missing. Yang-rae attacks him, and Min-chan pushes him off a hill, severely injuring him. Min-chan's wife calls and informs him that their son is safe, as he was at a friend's house. Min-chan prepares to surrender himself to the police, but sees the likeness of Jesus Christ appear in a flash of lighting. Min-chan becomes convinced that God has given him the divine task of punishing sinners and seemingly kills Yang-rae. Meanwhile, homicide detective Lee Yeon-hee, whose sister was a rape victim of Yang-rae and had committed suicide after he received light punishment, investigates the disappearance of the young girl being preyed upon by Yang-rae.

Min-chan is suddenly given the promotion to bishop. Believing that he is being rewarded for his actions, he confronts his wife, who confesses to her affair. After arriving at a nursing home for a religious event, Min-chain discovers that Yang-rae survived the fall and is being treated there. Min-chan sneaks Yang-rae out of the home and tortures him, believing that God let him survive for more punishment. Yang-rae admits to kidnapping the girl but refuses to tell him her location, which Min-chan refuses to believe. Meanwhile, Yeon-hee investigates Min-chan and finds where Yang-rae is imprisoned, but she is knocked out by Min-chan.

Min-chan divulges to Yeon-hee his plan to kill Yang-rae and frame her. Yeon-hee breaks free and fights Min-chan while Yang-rae tries to escape. During the struggle, Yang-rae gives a clue to the girl's location before he falls to his death. Min-chan is arrested during police and insists that his actions were done under the order of God.

Yeon-hee deciphers Yang-Rae's clue and learns that the girl is imprisoned at Yang-rae's old home, which is set to be demolished. She rescues the young girl before the home is destroyed. Yeon-hee then visits Min-chan in prison and informs him that the girl is alive, but Min-chan refuses to believe her. Returning to his cell, he cleans a dark spot on the concrete wall and becomes emotional upon seeing what he believes to be the portrait of Jesus Christ imprinted underneath.

== Cast ==
- Ryu Jun-yeol as Sung Min-chan
- Shin Hyun-been as Lee Yeon-hee
- Shin Min-jae as ex-convict Yang-rae
- Han Ji-hyun as Lee Yeon-joo
- Kim Bo-min as Shin A-young
- Kim Do-young as Lee Nak-seong
- Moon Joo-yeon as Lee Si-young
- Bae Yoon-gyu as So Eun-gyu
- Oh Chi-woon as Team leader
- Woo Kang-min as Section chief

== Production ==
=== Development ===
Director Yeon Sang-ho, who directed Train to Busan (2016), and produced by Alfonso Cuarón, who directed Roma (2018), teamed up while Wow Point managed the production of the film.

=== Casting ===
In 2023, both Ryu Jun-yeol and Shin Hyun-been were reportedly cast and positively reviewing it.

=== Filming ===
Principal photography of the film commenced in April 2024, and filming ended in June of the same year.

== Release ==
The film was made available to stream exclusively on Netflix on March 21, 2025.

== Reception ==
On the review aggregator website Rotten Tomatoes, 71% of 14 critics' reviews are positive, with an average rating of 6.4/10.

James Marsh of South China Morning Post gave it a rating of 2/5 and criticized the film. JK Sooja of Common Sense Media awarded the film 3/5 stars. Giovanni Lago of Next Best Picture gave it a rating of 6/10 and called it "disjointed".
