= Cinderella at 2 AM =

2024 South Korean television series

- Promotional poster
- Hangul: 새벽 2시의 신데렐라
- RR: Saebyeok 2siui Sinderelra
- MR: Saebyŏk 2siŭi Sinderella
- Genre: Romantic comedy; Workplace
- Created by: Park Jun-hwa
- Based on: Cinderella at 2 AM by Aigome
- Written by: Oh Eun-ji
- Directed by: Seo Min-jung; Bae Hee-young
- Starring: Shin Hyun-been; Moon Sang-min
- Music by: Ha Geun-young
- Country of origin: South Korea
- Original language: Korean
- No. of episodes: 10

Production
- Production companies: Imaginus; Studio Aljja

Original release
- Network: Coupang Play
- Release: August 24 – September 22, 2024

Cinderella at 2 AM (Korean: 새벽 2시의 신데렐라) is a 2024 South Korean romantic comedy workplace television series written by Oh Eun-ji, co-directed by Seo Min-jung and Bae Hee-young, and starring Shin Hyun-been and Moon Sang-min. Based on the web novel of the same name by Aigome, it depicts the love story of an ordinary woman who prioritizes protecting herself and a third-generation chaebol man who believes that protecting love is protecting himself. It was released on Coupang Play from August 24, to September 22, 2024, every Saturday and Sunday at 21:00 (KST). It was also broadcast on Channel A on the same day at 21:20 (KST) and is available for streaming on Viu and Viki in selected regions.

== Synopsis ==
Cinderella at 2 AM is an office romantic comedy about the struggles of Ha Yoon-seo, a realistic and capable woman who believes that there is no Cinderella in reality and tries to break up with Seo Joo-won, a romanticist who believes that conditions are not important in love and a perfect young chaebol man who only looks at her.

== Cast and characters ==
- Shin Hyun-been as Ha Yoon-seo

Manager of the brand marketing team at a credit card company who never loses her confidence anywhere and anytime thanks to her ability. She is pretty with a good personality, good at her job, makes a lot of money, and is perfect in every way, but incapable of dating.

- Moon Sang-min as Seo Joo-won

A new employee on Yoon-seo's team who is not only handsome and physically fit, but also wealthy and has a gentle personality. He is actually a third-generation chaebol and the son of AL Group.

- Yoon Park as Seo Si-won

The eldest son of AL Group who ends up in a political marriage with Mi-jin and Joo-won's older brother.

- Park So-jin as Lee Mi-jin

A hot chaebol influencer and executive director of CM Department Store who choose a political marriage with Si-won.

- Lee Kyu-sung as Bae Jang-hee

He is nicknamed "Deputy Grasshopper" by the AL Card Marketing Team, who is impossible to hate.

- Kim Tae-jung as Ha Ji-suk

Yoon-seo's younger brother

- Lee Hyun-woo as Lee Seong-min

An artist

- Kang Kyung-hun as Yeong-su's mother
- Baek Ji-won as Kim Hee-sook

Yoon-seo's mother (ep. 7-8)

== Production ==
Cinderella at 2 AM was created by Park Jun-hwan, written by Oh Eun-ji, and co-directed by Seo Min-jung and Bae Hee-young. Imaginus and Studio Aljja managed the production. It is based on the web novel of the same name by Aigome which was published in October 2013 and serialized as Naver series and webtoon in November 2015 and August 2020, respectively.

On August 25, 2023, both Shin Hyun-been and Moon Sang-min were reportedly cast as the main characters of the series.

It was reported that the series was supposed to air on JTBC but later changed to Channel A.

On March 28, 2024, Coupang Play officially confirmed the appearances of Shin and Hyun as the lead actors for the series.

On August 16, 2024, Studio MaumC announced the artists lineup namely Vincent Blue, Sam Kim, Ha Hyun-sang, Yeonjun of Tomorrow X Together, Riwoo of Dasutt, Kim Hee-won, and EJel, who participated in the series' OST.

== Release ==
In an interview with Shin Hyun-been, she said that Cinderella at 2 AM is expected to be released in the second half of 2024 and Coupang Play confirmed it in March 2024.

Coupang Play announced that the series will premiere on August 24, 2024, on their platform every Saturday and Sunday at 21:00 (KST), and will air on Channel A at 21:20 (KST). It will also be available to stream on Viu and Viki in selected regions.

== Ratings ==
Average TV viewership ratings (nationwide)
Ep.	Original broadcast date	Average audience share (Nielsen Korea)
1	August 24, 2024	0.628% (35th)
2	August 25, 2024	0.8%
3	August 31, 2024	0.4%
4	September 1, 2024	0.5%
5	September 7, 2024	0.4%
6	September 8, 2024	0.5%
7	September 14, 2024	0.4%
8	September 15, 2024	0.3%
9	September 21, 2024	0.3%
10	September 22, 2024	0.6%
Average		0.48%
In the table above, the blue numbers represent the lowest ratings and the red numbers represent the highest ratings.; This drama aired on a cable channel/pay TV which normally has a relatively smaller audience compared to free-to-air TV/public broadcasters (KBS, SBS, MBC, and EBS).
