= Argon (TV series) =

2017 South Korean TV series

- Promotional poster
- Also known as: Arogon
- Hangul: 아르곤
- RR: Areugon
- MR: Arŭgon
- Genre: Workplace
- Created by: Studio Dragon
- Written by: Joon Young-shin; Joo Won-gyu; Shin Ha-eun
- Directed by: Lee Yoon-jung
- Starring: Kim Joo-hyuk; Chun Woo-hee
- Country of origin: South Korea
- Original language: Korean
- No. of episodes: 8

Production
- Executive producers: Park Ho-sik; Song Jung-woo
- Producer: Jo Moon-joo
- Production company: Daydream Entertainment

Original release
- Network: tvN
- Release: September 4 – September 26, 2017

Argon (Korean: 아르곤; RR: Areugon) is a 2017 South Korean television series directed by Lee Yoon-jung, starring Kim Joo-hyuk and Chun Woo-hee as passionate reporters. The series marks Chun Woo-hee's first small screen lead role. It aired on cable channel tvN every Monday and Tuesday at 22:50 (KST) from September 4–26, 2017.

The series was one of Kim Joo-hyuk's last projects before his death on October 30, 2017.

== Synopsis ==
The story of truthful reporters who strive to deliver the facts in a world full of fake news.

== Cast ==
=== Main ===
- Kim Joo-hyuk as Kim Baek-jin, a perfectionist news anchor, reporter and leader of a news program called Argon.
- Chun Woo-hee as Lee Yeon-hwa, a temporary employee who gets transferred to the Argon team in the last 3 months of her contract and fights to become an official reporter.

=== Supporting ===
- Park Won-sang as Shin Chul, the producer of Argon and a veteran reporter.
- Lee Seung-joon as Yoo Myung-ho, the report bureau chief.
- Shin Hyun-been as Chae Soo-min, a lawyer and long-time friend of Baek-jin.
- Park Hee-von as Yook Hye-ri, a veteran writer.
- Shim Ji-ho as Uhm Min-ho, a smart newspaper reporter from the finance department.
- Park Min-ha as Lee Jin-hee, also known as "the pretty writer" who loves being called that she relies on tricks and charm more than her writing skills to get her through work.
- Ji Il-joo as Park Nam-gyu
- Ji Yoon-ho as Oh Seung-yong
- Kim Joo-hun as Ahn Jae-geun, a whistleblower at Seomyoung Foods.
- Lee Geung-young as Lee Geun-hwa
- Ryu Han-bi as Kim Seo-woo, Kim Baek-jin's daughter.

== Original soundtrack ==
The Argon soundtrack album is written by music director Tearliner. It contains 2 single albums and one album with 10 score pieces from the series. It features vocal performances from Cho Won-sun and Owen.

Argon

Soundtrack album by Various Artists
- Released: September 26, 2017
- Genre: Soundtrack
- Languages: Korean; English
- Label: tvN

Argon OST BGM Album
No.	Title	Artist	Length
1.	"Argon" (아르곤)	Tearliner	2:05
2.	"An autumn trip" (가을여행)	Tearliner	2:50
3.	"Free Rider" (프리라이더)	Tearliner	2:16
4.	"A lazy resolution" (게으른 다짐)	Tearliner	2:10
5.	"Lanista" (라니스타)	Tearliner	3:13
6.	"Arena" (아레나)	Tearliner	2:08
7.	"Trust"	Sentimental Scenery	1:47
8.	"70's Life" (두근두근)	Tearliner	1:02
9.	"Jump" (래완의 하루)	Tearliner	2:48
10.	"A moment of empathy" (공감의 순간)	Tearliner	2:14

=== Singles ===
Argon OST Part 1
No.	Title	Artist	Length
1.	"Moon Stop" (달의 정류장)	Tearliner (Feat. Cho Won-sun)	4:50
2.	"Moon Stop (Instrumental)" (달의 정류장 (Instrumental))	Tearliner	4:50
Total length:			9:00

Argon OST Part 2
No.	Title	Artist	Length
1.	"Youth consolation" (청춘위로)	Tearliner (Feat. Owen)	3:45
2.	"Youth consolation (Instrumental)" (청춘위로 (Instrumental))	Tearliner	3:45
Total length:			6:90

== Production ==
The first script reading of the cast was held on July 12, 2017.

== Ratings ==
Ep.	Original broadcast date	Average audience share		
Ep.	Original broadcast date	Nielsen Korea		TNmS
Ep.	Original broadcast date	Nationwide	Seoul	Nationwide
1	September 4, 2017	2.500%	2.569%	3.0%
2	September 5, 2017	2.869%	3.180%	2.4%
3	September 11, 2017	2.588%	2.625%	2.6%
4	September 12, 2017	2.411%	2.587%	2.9%
5	September 18, 2017	2.602%	3.238%	2.3%
6	September 19, 2017	3.068%	3.424%	2.6%
7	September 25, 2017	2.786%	2.934%	2.8%
8	September 26, 2017	2.761%	3.325%	2.5%
Average		2.698%	2.985%	2.6%
In the table above, the blue numbers represent the lowest ratings and the red numbers represent the highest ratings.; This series aired on a cable channel/pay TV which normally has a relatively smaller audience compared to free-to-air TV/public broadcasters (KBS, SBS, MBC and EBS).
