= Colony (2026 film) =

2026 film by Yeon Sang-ho

- Theatrical release poster
- Hangul: 군체
- Hanja: 群體
- RR: Gunche
- MR: Kunch'e
- Directed by: Yeon Sang-ho
- Written by: Yeon Sang-ho; Choi Gyu-seok
- Produced by: Yoomin Hailey Yang
- Starring: Jun Ji-hyun; Koo Kyo-hwan; Ji Chang-wook; Shin Hyun-been; Kim Shin-rok; Go Soo
- Cinematography: Byun Bong-sun
- Edited by: Han Mee-yeon
- Music by: Chai Min-joo
- Production companies: Wow Point; Smilegate
- Distributed by: Showbox
- Release dates: May 15, 2026 (Cannes); May 21, 2026 (South Korea)
- Running time: 123 minutes
- Country: South Korea
- Language: Korean
- Budget: ₩17 billion (~$12 million)
- Box office: $57 million

Colony (Korean: 군체) is a 2026 South Korean action horror film directed and written by Yeon Sang-ho with Choi Gyu-seok as co-writer. It stars Jun Ji-hyun, Koo Kyo-hwan, Ji Chang-wook, Shin Hyun-been, Kim Shin-rok, and Go Soo. The film explores the harrowing struggle of isolated survivors trapped in a building, quarantined amidst an unknown outbreak, as they fight for survival against the unpredictably evolving infected.

The film had its world premiere at the Midnight Screenings section of the 2026 Cannes Film Festival on May 15, 2026. Distributed by Showbox, it was released theatrically in South Korea on May 21.

== Plot ==
Scientist Seo Young-chul warns the police that he will launch a bio-terrorist attack at the Dongwoo-ri Building, then injects himself with the supposed vaccine to his mutated slime mold bioweapon. Meanwhile, Chains Bio is holding a presentation in the building, where CEO Kang Woo-chul demonstrates the physarum polycephalum's cell-regeneration capabilities and collective intelligence, citing work by William Morton Wheeler. Kwon Se-jeong, an ostracised and unemployed professor, attends after being invited by the company, hoping to secure a job through her ex-husband Han Gyu-sung, who is preparing to emigrate overseas. Security guard Choi Hyun-seok is also at the building with his mobility-impaired older sister, Hyun-hee.

After the presentation, Young-chul confronts Woo-chul in a third-floor VIP room, accusing him of plagiarising his research before injecting him with the slime mold. Woo-chul rapidly mutates and infects nearby employees, triggering an outbreak. Counter-terrorism team leader Lee Bong-seok arrives with his squad, but the building is placed under lockdown, trapping them inside.

Se-jeong, Gyu-sung, Hyun-seok, Hyun-hee, Bong-seok, school bullying victim So-eun and several civilians become trapped in the shopping mall. During their escape attempt, Gyu-sung dies saving a delinquent female student. Se-jeong discovers that the infected possess advanced swarm intelligence, sharing sensory information through mycelium and rapidly evolving after each failed attack. When Bong-seok reveals that Young-chul caused the outbreak and possesses the vaccine, the group heads to the third floor to find him. Using perfume and antifreeze to evade the infected, they activate the fire sprinklers, temporarily paralysing the slime mold, and locate Young-chul before heading towards the 30th floor for evacuation. However, they discover that Young-chul can see through the infected's perspectives. He ambushes them and escapes, killing several survivors.

Meanwhile, Gyu-sung's wife, Gong Seol-hee, joins a research team investigating Young-chul's laboratory, established after his dismissal from Chains Bio. Infected monkeys escape and attack the researchers. When a SWAT officer kills monkey #1, the rest of the horde suddenly freezes, which indicates that the infected has a hivemind among them.

The survivors move to the underground control room to find Young-chul. Hyun-hee stays behind, using CCTV monitors and a group chat to guide them safely. They find Young-chul, who deliberately allows Woo-chul to bite him, gaining complete control over the infected. During an argument, Bong-seok accidentally reveals the control room's location, allowing Young-chul's horde to overrun it. Hyun-hee deliberately gives false directions so Hyun-seok can escape and is killed. Devastated, Hyun-seok vows revenge and reveals the survivors' location over the intercom.

The survivors splinter. Bong-seok shoots a civilian to use as bait but is mauled to death alongside him. The delinquent student betrays So-eun by pushing her into the horde, but So-eun bites her to death after becoming infected. Hyun-seok confronts Young-chul, who summons the infected Hyun-hee. Broken by his sister's death, Hyun-seok stops resisting and is killed by her.

Young-chul confronts Se-jeong and reveals that he invited her to the event for revenge: she had exposed his father for embezzlement, leading to his father's suicide. A SWAT team breaches the area and detains Young-chul, but the officers are infected and become his guards. Young-chul escapes with them and unleashes the infected in the city centre, spreading the outbreak.

Guided by Seol-hee over the phone, Se-jeong disguises herself with a mycelium-covered jacket taken from a corpse and drives towards Young-chul. She throws the jacket over an infected person, causing hundreds of infected to form a collective, spinning ant mill. The resulting sensory overload crashes their shared system, reducing all the infected to a primitive state. Se-jeong hides beneath a bus while the disoriented horde attacks its advertisement, inadvertently pushing Young-chul into a burning car, where he dies. His death causes every infected person across the city to freeze.

With the only supposed vaccine gone, Se-jeong leaves the area and discusses with Seol-hee how to explain the infection to the public. As she walks away, however, one of the frozen infected suddenly moves.

== Cast ==
- Jun Ji-hyun as Kwon Se-jeong, a biotechnology professor. After losing her professorship due to her intolerance for injustice, she arrives at Doongwoori Building for a conference at her ex-husband Han Gyu-seong's suggestion, trying to land her a new job, and gets trapped inside. As a biotechnologist, she fights to lead survivors and escape, deciphering the infected's behavior and evolution to survive.
- Koo Kyo-hwan as Seo Young-cheol, the biology scientist responsible for the outbreak. A genius biologist, he previously worked at a biotech company, envisioning a new humanity. At the outbreak's center, he becomes a target for authorities and survivors after revealing he has the vaccine.
- Ji Chang-wook as Choi Hyun-seok, a security team member at Doongwoori Building, struggling to protect his family during a sudden infection outbreak. Trapped with his older sister, who was visiting for his long-awaited vacation, Hyun-seok fights to protect her, as she has a lower-body disability.
- Shin Hyun-been as Gong Seol-hee, a biotechnologist who observes the situation from outside the building and struggles to resolve the crisis. When Seol-hee loses contact with her husband, Han Gyu-seong, who is in the Doongwoori building, she accepts the special investigation team's offer to investigate the case.
- Kim Shin-rok as Choi Hyun-hee, an IT company employee and Hyun-seok's older sister, she visited the Doongwoori Building to have lunch with her brother during a long-awaited vacation, ending up stuck with other survivors when the infection broke out.
- Go Soo as Han Gyu-seong, Se-jeong's ex-husband, who visits the Doongwoori building to present his ex-wife with a job offer and becomes trapped inside. He hides from the suddenly descending infected, but discovers other survivors in danger and becomes the first to expose himself to them as he tries to save them.

== Production ==
=== Development ===
It was announced in October 2024 that Yeon Sang-ho, director of Train to Busan (2016) and Peninsula (2020), was preparing the zombie-thriller film titled Colony, planned for a theatrical release. The film would feature large-scale action scenes, combining human groups with zombie themes. Choi Gyu-seok collaborated with director Yeon on the writing. It is produced by Wow Point and Smilegate, and distributed by Showbox. By February 2025, Showbox's executive director Lee Hyun-jung confirmed the investment and distribution of the film. The production budget was approximately ₩17 billion (approximately $12 million).

"This will certainly be the most commercial film I've made so far. (...) I'm trying to make a film that can be fun, drawing on the strengths of Train to Busan and Hellbound."

— Yeon Sang-ho

The initial concept for the film, as envisioned by Choi Gyu-seok and director Yeon, centered on emphasizing the suspense generated by the constant shifting of roles. The zombies, being in a state of constant evolution, inevitably undergo changes, while human characters are assigned missions akin to a game, necessitating role-switching to achieve survival. Zombies in the film, possess mechanisms for interaction, and as the infection spreads and their numbers increase, their thinking speed accelerates and intelligence strengthens. However, their thought processes, learning patterns, and failure modes diverge significantly from humans, creating an eerie, unconventional nature that's uniquely theirs. Meanwhile, the humans battling them adapt, forging a distinct form of existence.

=== Casting ===
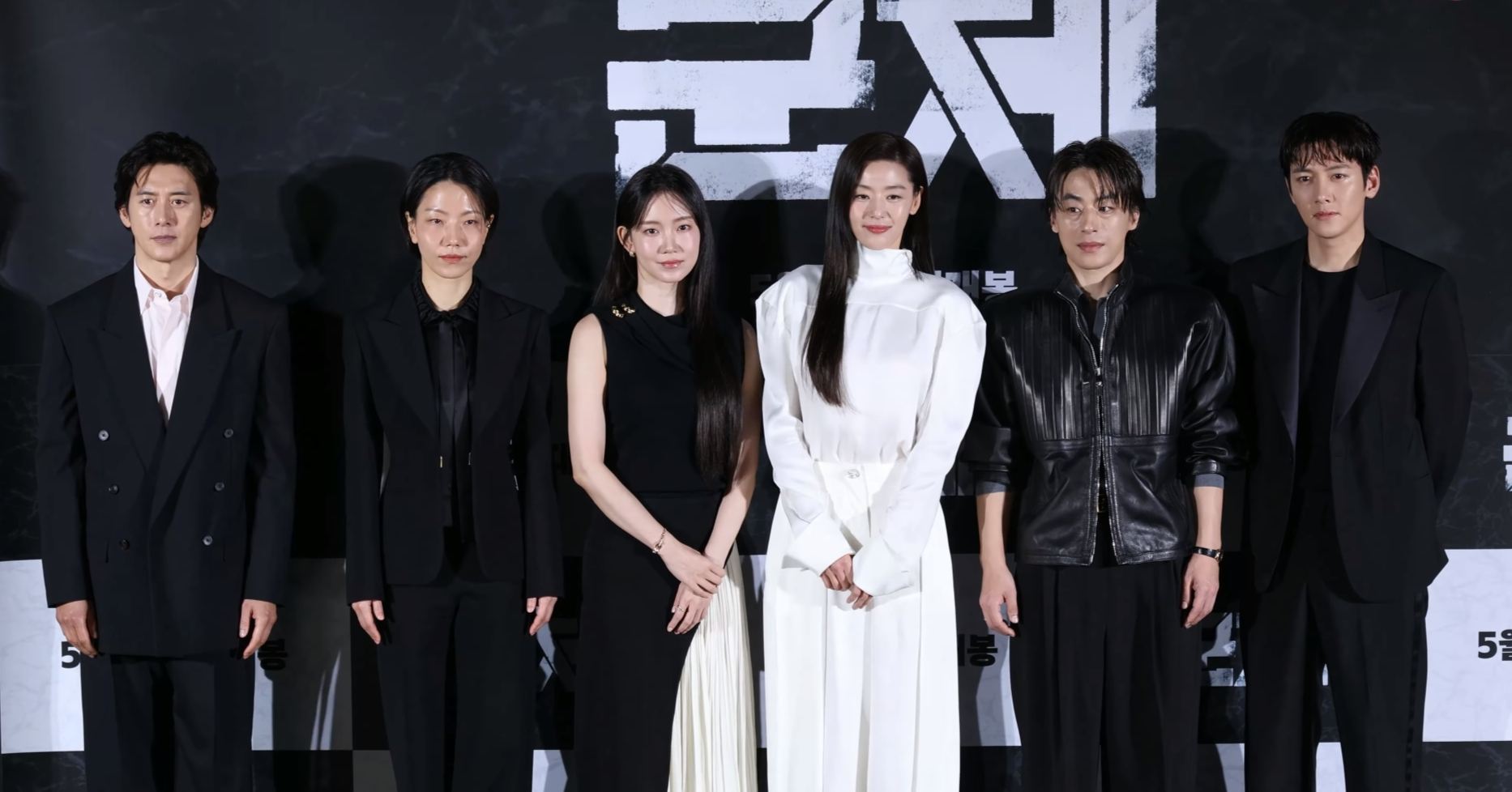
L to R: Go Soo, Kim Shin-rok, Shin Hyun-been, Jun Ji-hyun, Koo Kyo-hwan, and Ji Chang-wook at the press conference for the film Colony in April 2026

Casting announcements began in late October 2024, with Jun Ji-hyun receiving an offer and in talks. Shin Hyun-been, Koo Kyo-hwan, Kim Shin-rok, and Ji Chang-wook would also be joining the cast.

The appearances of Jun Ji-hyun, Koo Kyo-hwan, Shin Hyun-been, Kim Shin-rok, and Ji Chang-wook, along with Go Soo for a special appearance, were officially confirmed by March 2025.

=== Filming ===
Principal photography commenced in early March 2025, and was completed at the end of June of the same year. Filming took place three times in two locations in Dangjin, South Chungcheong.

Choreographer Jeon Young, who worked with Yeon Sang-ho on Train to Busan, Peninsula, and Hellbound (2021–2024), teamed up with dancer-choreographers Song Seung-wook, Lim Hee-jong, and Jung Eui-young to create unique zombie movements.

== Release ==
Colony premiered in the Midnight Screenings section of the 79th Cannes Film Festival on May 15, 2026. This appearance marked a return to the festival for director Yeon Sang-ho, whose 2016 film Train to Busan debuted in the same category. The film was scheduled for theatrical release in South Korea on May 21, 2026. Prior to its premiere, Showbox secured distribution deals in over 120 international territories. Key partners include Well Go USA Entertainment for North America, StudioCanal UK for the United Kingdom, Gaga Corporation for Japan, and ARP Sélection for France. Other regional distributors include Plaion Pictures for Germany and Italy, and K-Movie Entertainment UK for Australia and New Zealand.

The film opened the 25th New York Asian Film Festival on July 10, 2026. It will close 39th Tokyo International Film Festival on November 4, 2026.

In North America, Well Go USA scheduled the theatrical launch for August 28, 2026. This date was selected to follow a 10th-anniversary 4K re-release of Train to Busan, which returns to theaters two weeks prior on August 14. Doris Pfardrescher, President and CEO of Well Go USA, characterized the film as an evolution of the director's style, suggesting a more intense scale than his earlier genre entries.

== Reception ==
=== Box office ===
It grossed $44 million at the Korean box office, including a $9.6 million opening weekend.

=== Critical response ===
On the review aggregator website Rotten Tomatoes, 82% of 115 critics' reviews are positive, with an average rating of 6.9/10. The website's consensus reads: "Layering modern anxieties about technology onto a nightmarish outbreak, Colony lacks the vivid characterizations that distinguish director Yeon Sang-ho's best work but mostly reaffirms his mastery over zombie mayhem." Metacritic, which uses a weighted average, assigned the film a score of 57 out of 100, based on 18 critics, indicating "mixed or average" reviews.

Chad Collins of Dread Central rated the film of 4 out of 5 and wrote, "Yeon Sang-ho’s Colony is 'Train to Busan' on steroids. It’s a rip-roaring, terrifying zombie epic, and the best undead movie in years."

Joanne Soh of The Straits Times gave the film a rating of 3 out of 5, writing, "Colony is entertaining and easy to consume. Just don’t expect any deeper bite."

Nikki Baughan of Screen International wrote, "As a modern zombie movie, Colony certainly has a satisfying bite."

Ritesh Mehta of IndieWire gave the film a rating of C+ and wrote, "Yeon might be a very good student of the genre, and the deck he crafts is often masterful. It’s just that the communication lessons and memory of human loss don’t hit hard enough."

Brian Tallerico of RogerEbert.com wrote, "Maybe Sang-ho needed the confined space of a train to really hit his mark. Let’s get him back on board one soon."

Zachary Lee of TheWrap wrote, "Zombie projects can be smart, but this project seems too unsure of its own identity to fully commit to the zany ideas Yeon has in store. It would have been better to stick to being brainless."

=== Accolades ===
Award	Year	Category	Recipient(s)	Result	Ref.
Blue Dragon Film Awards	2026	Best Film	Colony	Pending	
Blue Dragon Film Awards	2026	Best Director	Yeon Sang-ho	Pending	
Blue Dragon Film Awards	2026	Best Supporting Actor	Koo Kyo-hwan	Pending	
Blue Dragon Film Awards	2026	Best Supporting Actress	Kim Shin-rok	Pending	
Blue Dragon Film Awards	2026	Best Cinematography and Lighting	Byun Bong-sun	Pending	
Blue Dragon Film Awards	2026	Technical Award (SFX Makeup)	Hwang Hyo-gyun	Pending	
Buil Film Awards	2026	Best Cinematography	Byun Bong-sun	Nominated	
Sitges Film Festival	2026	Best Special, Visual or Makeup Effects	Hong Jeong-ho	Won	
