= The King of Pigs =

- Film poster
- Directed by: Yeon Sang-ho
- Written by: Yeon Sang-ho
- Produced by: Stanley Kwak; Kim Il-gwon; Cho Young-kag; Chae Su-jin
- Edited by: Yeon Sang-ho; Lee Yeon-jeong
- Music by: Eom Been
- Production companies: Studio Dadashow; KT&G Sangsangmadang
- Distributed by: KT&G Sangsangmadang; Indiestory
- Release date: October 8, 2011 (Busan International Film Festival)
- Running time: 97 minutes
- Country: South Korea
- Language: Korean
- Budget: US$150,000
- Box office: US$124,068

The King of Pigs (Korean: 돼지의 왕; RR: Dwaejiui wang) is a 2011 South Korean adult animated psychological thriller film directed by Yeon Sang-ho. It was Yeon's debut film, and was based on many of his former experiences in high school. The film was selected to be screened in the Directors' Fortnight section at the 2012 Cannes Film Festival, making it the first Korean film of its kind to be screened in Cannes. The film was highly polarizing, but was mostly praised for its realistic portrayal of bullying, violence, and systemic poverty and won three awards at the 2011 Busan International Film Festival. As the first adult animated film produced in South Korea, it, along with the film at the same year, Leafie, A Hen into the Wild, was responsible for South Korea's increase in legitimacy in the animation industry.

== Cast ==
- Yang Ik-june as Jung Jong-suk
  - Kim Kkot-bi as young Jong-suk
- Oh Jung-se as Hwang Kyung-min
  - Park Hee-von as young Kyung-min
- kim hye na as Kim Chul

== Synopsis ==
After his business goes bankrupt, thirty-something Kyung-min (Oh Jung-se) kills his wife impulsively. Hiding his anger, he seeks out his former middle school classmate Jong-suk (Yang Ik-june). Jong-suk now works as a ghostwriter for an autobiography, but he dreams of writing his own novel. For the first time in 15 years they meet. Kyung-min and Jong-suk both hide their own current situations and begin to talk about their middle school days.

At their middle school, they were classified by their wealth, grades as well as stature. Kyung-min and Jong-suk were at the bottom. They were called "pigs" and were bullied by a ruling class known as "dogs". When they were called pigs they got angry, but couldn't do anything against the dogs. Then a King of Pigs appears – Kim Chul (Kim Hye-na). Kyung-min and Jong-suk began to rely on Kim Chul.

Whilst in the present Kyung-min leads Jong-suk to their middle school grounds to disclose to Jong-suk the shocking truth about what happened to Chul 15 years ago.

== Reception ==
Maggie Lee of The Hollywood Reporter wrote that while the film contains a high level of stylised violence, "it is not an artistic exercise. Pain is represented as something very real, enough to make one wince. ... The King of Pigs captures many subtle class gradations in Korean society and shows how it corrupts human interaction." Lee also wrote: "Technically adept and highly cinematic in its storytelling, the US$150,000 production proves that it is still possible to produce quality animation with a modest budget." Peter Bradshaw of The Guardian awarded the film four stars out of five, and called it "a strangely gripping and upsetting movie."

The review aggregator website Rotten Tomatoes reported that 75% of critics have given the film a positive review based on 20 reviews, with an average rating of 6.50/10.

Korean cinema website KoreanScreen gave the movie a 4 out of 5 stars, writing, "Bleak, angry and utterly uncompromising, this animated view of hierarchical high schools delivers a relentless break-time punch to the stomach." On 12 April 2021, KoreanScreen listed The King of Pigs as the 71st best Korean film of all time in their list of 100 Greatest Korean Films Ever, a list polled by 158 international film critics from 28 countries, making it the only animated film in the list. The list wrote, "Sometimes films are necessarily bleak in order to imprint their message on your mind. This is a lesson on bullying and hierarchical high school environments you are unlikely to ever forget."

== Web series adaptation ==
A web series adaptation of the same title, produced by Studio Dragon and Hidden Sequence, premiered on the online streaming service TVING on March 18, 2022.

== See also ==
- 2011 in film
- Cinema of South Korea
- List of animated feature films of 2011
