= Yeon Sang-ho =

South Korean film director and screenwriter

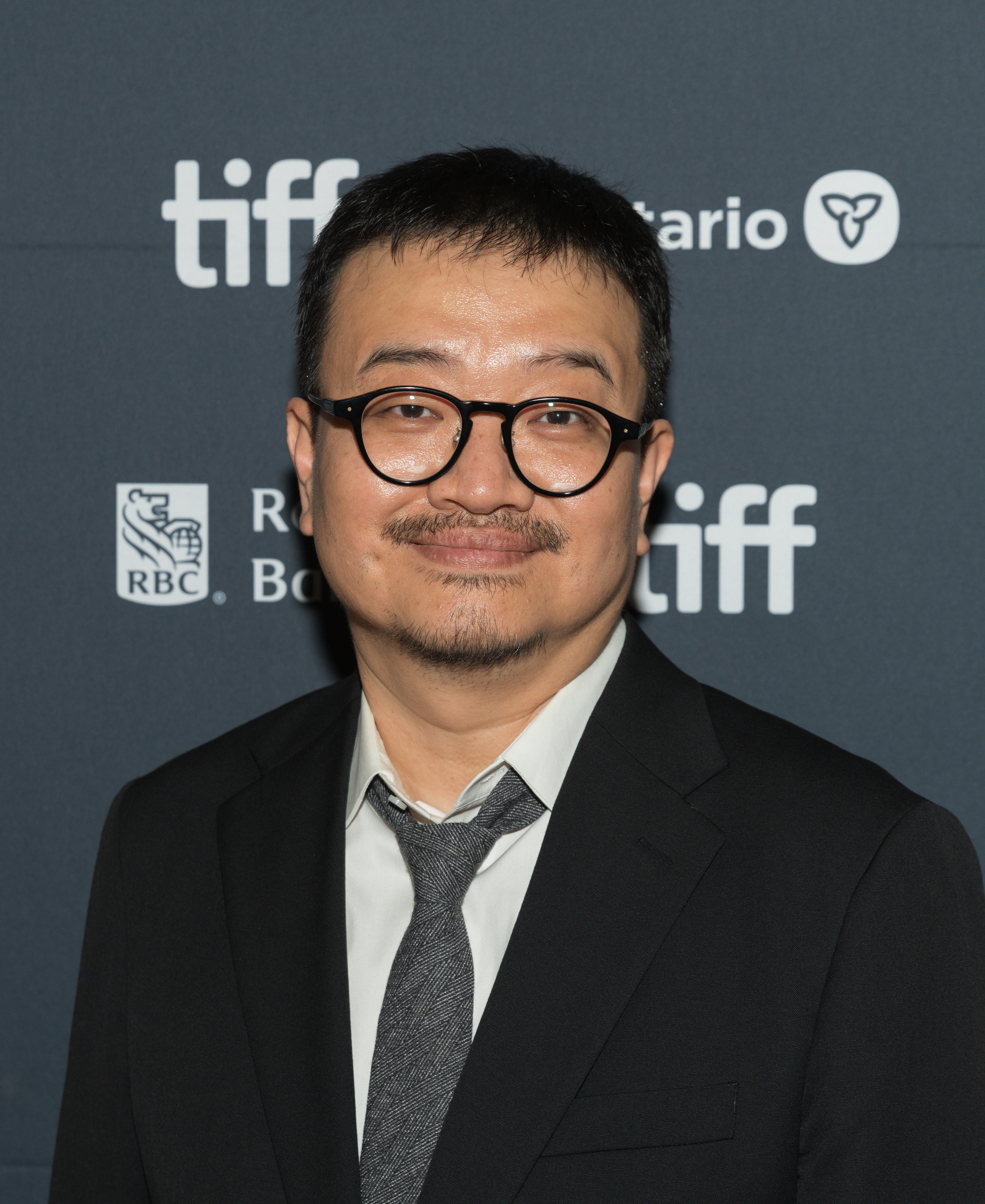
- Yeon in 2025
- Born: December 25, 1977 (age 48); Seoul, South Korea
- Education: Sangmyung University - Western Painting
- Occupations: Film director, screenwriter
- Years active: 1997–present

Korean name
- Hangul: 연상호
- Hanja: 延尚昊
- RR: Yeon Sangho
- MR: Yŏn Sangho

Yeon Sang-ho (born December 25, 1977) is a South Korean film director and screenwriter. He gained international popularity for his adult animated films The King of Pigs (2011) and The Fake (2013), the live-action film Train to Busan (2016), its animated prequel Seoul Station (2016) and live-action sequel Peninsula (2020), and the first South Korean superhero film Psychokinesis (2018).

== Career ==
Born in Seoul on December 25, 1977, Yeon Sang-ho graduated from Sangmyung University with a degree in Western Painting. He directed his first animated short film, Megalomania of D in 1997, followed by D-Day in 2000 and The Hell in 2002, then set up his own production house Studio Dadashow in 2004. His next two animated shorts The Hell: Two Kinds of Life (2006) and Love Is Protein (2008) were invited to various international film festivals. The Hell: Two Kinds of Life won the Asian Ghost Award at the Short Shorts Film Festival Asia and the Public Award for Best Film School (Short Film Battle Royal) at the 2007 Lyon Asian Film Festival, and Love Is Protein screened in competition at the 2009 Curtocircuit International Short Film Festival of Santiago de Compostela in 2009. Love Is Protein was later included in the three-short omnibus Indie Anibox: Selma's Protein Coffee. Yeon also directed the animated opening trailer for the Busan International Film Festival in 2010.

Yeon's first feature-length animation was The King of Pigs (2011), about a man who kills his wife after his business goes bankrupt, and seeks out his long-lost friend, a ghostwriter, 15 years after both had been severely bullied as adolescents in middle school. Inspired by the works of Satoshi Kon and Minoru Furuya, Yeon said the incidents in the film were drawn from his own life, and he cried while writing the screenplay. The low-budget (US$150,000) film drew widespread critical acclaim for its raw portrayal of bullying, violence and systemic poverty (and the lifelong effects of such oppression), as well as the psychology of public attitudes toward a hero figure. It became the first Korean animated film to be invited to the Cannes Film Festival, where it screened in the 2012 Directors' Fortnight sidebar. It won numerous awards at domestic and international film festivals, including the Director's Guild of Korea Award for Best Director, CGV Movie Collage Award, and NETPAC Award at the 2011 Busan International Film Festival, the Satoshi Kon Award for Achievement in Animation and Special Mention (New Flesh Award for Best First Feature) at the 2012 Fantasia International Film Festival, and the Jury Prize at the 2013 Jameson Dublin International Film Festival.

His follow-up The Window was a 30-minute animated short depicting violence in the military, and was the first film of the Independent Short Film Release Project organized by Indiespace, an independent-only theater and Indieplug, a digital distributor of independent films. Yeon said the script (illustrated by cartoonist Choi Gyu-seok) was 100% based on his own personal experience while doing his mandatory military service. The Window won a Special Mention from the Jury at the 2013 Fantasia International Film Festival.

Yeon continued to make animation targeted at adults with dark, controversial themes that brutally and incisively explore human nature and social realism. His second feature The Fake (2013) critiqued organized religion, as a cult leader swindles rural, uneducated villagers out of their compensation money, while no one believes the local wastrel who discovers the truth (the characters were voiced by Oh Jung-se and Yang Ik-june, who previously starred in Love Is Protein and The King of Pigs). Yeon said he wrote the script in 2009 because of his political dissatisfaction regarding issues about the FTA and Four Major Rivers Project. The Fake made its world premiere at the 2013 Toronto International Film Festival, and won Best Film of AnimaFICX at the 2013 Gijón International Film Festival, Best Animated Feature Film at the 2013 Sitges Film Festival, and the FIPRESCI Award at the 2014 Korean Association of Film Critics Awards.

He then cast Ryu Seung-ryong and Shim Eun-kyung as voice actors in his third animated feature, Seoul Station (2015). Yeon said he wanted to depict society's collective rage in a "simple, powerful way" by making a zombie film in which zombies are among people protesting for the democratization of Korea.

In 2016, Yeon released his first live-action film Train to Busan, which takes place on a train to Busan as a zombie apocalypse suddenly breaks out in the country and threatens the safety of the passengers. The film was released to rave reviews, with praise given to its characters and use of social commentary. A standalone sequel Peninsula was released in 2020, also directed by Yeon.

In 2024, Yeon was tapped by Toho to write and produce a TV series adaptation of The Human Vapor to be distributed on Netflix.

== Filmography ==
=== Feature films ===
Year	Film	Credited as			Notes
Year	Film	Director	Writer	Producer	Notes
2011	The King of Pigs	Yes	Yes	No	also voice actor, editor, storyboard, character design, key animation, background artist, in between
2013	The Fake	Yes	Yes	No	also voice actor, editor, storyboard, key animation, compositing
2014	Master and Man	No	No	Yes	
2014	The Satellite Girl and Milk Cow	No	No	No	as voice actor
2016	The Senior Class	No	Yes	Yes	
2016	Train to Busan	Yes	Adaptation	No	
2016	Seoul Station	Yes	Yes	Yes	
2016	Kai	No	No	Yes	
2018	Psychokinesis	Yes	Yes	No	
2019	Princess Aya	No	No	Yes	
2020	Peninsula	Yes	Yes	No	
2021	The Cursed: Dead Man's Prey	No	Yes	No	
2023	Jung_E	Yes	Yes	No	
2025	Revelations	Yes	Yes	No	
2025	The Ugly	Yes	Yes	No	
2026	Colony	Yes	Yes	No	
2026	Paradise Lost	Yes	Yes	No	

=== Short films ===
Year	Film	Segment	Credited as		Notes
Year	Film	Segment	Director	Writer	Notes
1997	Megalomania of D	—	Yes	Yes	
2000	D-Day	—	Yes	Yes	
2002	The Hell	—	Yes	Yes	also producer, voice actor, rotoscoping cinematographer/line capture, layout, storyboard, in between
2006	The Hell: Two Kinds of Life	—	Yes	Yes	also editor, character design
2008	Indie Anibox: Selma's Protein Coffee	Love Is Protein	Yes	Yes	also lyricist
2012	The Window	—	Yes	Yes	also voice actor, animation director
2016	The Way Home	—	Yes	Yes	

=== Television ===
Year	Title	Credited as		Notes
Year	Title	Director	Writer	Notes
2011–2013	RedaKai	Yes	No	39 out of 52 episodes
2020	The Cursed	No	Yes	12 episodes
2021–present	Hellbound	Yes	Yes	6 episodes (Season 1); 6 episodes (Season 2)
2022	Monstrous	No	Yes	6 episodes
2024	The Bequeathed	No	Yes	6 episodes
2024	Parasyte: The Grey	Yes	Yes	6 episodes
2026	Human Vapor	No	Yes	8 episodes

== Awards ==
Year	Award	Category	Recipient(s)	Result	Ref(s)
2011	16th Busan International Film Festival	DGK Award for Best Director	The King of Pigs	Won	
2014	1st Wildflower Film Awards	Best Director	The Fake	Won	
2016	37th Blue Dragon Film Awards	Best Film	Train to Busan	Nominated	
2016	37th Blue Dragon Film Awards	Best New Director	Train to Busan	Nominated	
2016	25th Buil Film Awards	Best Film	Train to Busan	Nominated	
2016	25th Buil Film Awards	Yu Hyun-mok Film Arts Award	Train to Busan	Won	
2017	Fangoria Chainsaw Awards	Best Foreign-Language Film	Train to Busan	Won	
2017	43rd Saturn Awards	Best Horror Film	Train to Busan	Nominated	
2016	Korea Film Actor's Association Top Star Awards	Best New Director	Train to Busan	Won	
2017	8th KOFRA Film Awards	Best Discovery of the Year	Train to Busan	Won	
2017	53rd Baeksang Arts Awards	Best Film	Train to Busan	Nominated	
2017	53rd Baeksang Arts Awards	Best New Director	Train to Busan	Won	
2025	46th Blue Dragon Film Awards	Best Director	The Ugly	Nominated	
2025	46th Blue Dragon Film Awards	Best Screenplay	The Ugly	Nominated	
2026	New York Asian Film Festival	Daniel Craft Award for Excellence in Action Cinema	Excellence In Action Cinema	Honored	
2026	Blue Dragon Film Awards	Best Film	Colony	Pending	
2026	Blue Dragon Film Awards	Best Director	Colony	Pending	

=== State honors ===
Name of country, year given, and name of honor
Country	Year	Honor Or Award	Ref.
South Korea (Note: Honors are given at the Korean Popular Culture and Arts Awards, arranged by the Korea Creative Content Agency and hosted by the Ministry of Culture, Sports and Tourism. They are awarded to those who have contributed to the arts and South Korea's pop culture.)	2022	Prime Minister's Commendation	
