= Mourning Grave =

- Theatrical release poster
- Hangul: 소녀괴담
- Hanja: 少女怪談
- RR: Sonyeogoedam
- MR: Sonyŏgoedam
- Directed by: Oh In-chun
- Produced by: Lee Jong-ho; Ju Seong-ho; Bang Mi-jeong; Lee Suk-joon
- Starring: Kang Ha-neul; Kim So-eun
- Cinematography: Kwon Sang-jun
- Edited by: Kim Chang-ju; Kim Woo-hyeon
- Production companies: Ghost Pictures; Jupiter Films
- Distributed by: Little Big Pictures; 9ers Entertainment (international)
- Release date: July 3, 2014
- Running time: 90 minutes
- Country: South Korea
- Language: Korean
- Box office: US$3.4 million

Mourning Grave (Korean: 소녀괴담; RR: Sonyeogoedam; lit. 'Girl Ghost Story' (Note: The original Korean title was The Girl's Grave (소녀무덤; Sonyeomudeom), but it was changed following the sinking of the MV Sewol.)) is a 2014 South Korean mystery horror film starring Kang Ha-neul and Kim So-eun.

== Synopsis ==
In-soo, a high school student, has a special gift to see ghosts. He transfers to a high school in a rural area outside of Seoul. Plagued by them everywhere he goes and harassed by classmates because of it, he returns to his hometown to live with his uncle and finally put the past to rest. No sooner does he arrive than he sees his first ghost there, a pretty girl; but, just like before, it's not just ghosts that affect his life. School bullies remain a problem, but soon along, the bullies start being attacked by a vengeful ghost wearing a bloody mask, and In-su starts to think that his new friend, the pretty ghost, may have something to do with it.

== Cast ==
- Kang Ha-neul as Kang In-soo
- Kim So-eun as Jung Se-hee (Ghost girl)
- Kim Jung-tae as Seon-il
- Han Hye-rin as Park Hyun-ji
- Park Doo-shik as Lee Hae-chul
- Joo Min-ha as Yoon Na-ra
- Joo Da-young as Lee Sung-hee
- Lee Bom as Hye-jung
- Kwak Jung-wook as Lee Ki-tae
- Kim Young-choon as Ho-seop
- Lee Ah-hyun as Oh Mi-hee
- Oh Yoon-hong as Ah-young's mother
- Yoon Chan-young as Kang In-soo (young)
- Shin Soo-yeon as Jung Se-hee (young)

== Original soundtrack ==
Mourning Grave: Original Sound Track

Soundtrack album by MBLAQ
- Released: June 26, 2014
- Genres: Pop, K-pop, soundtrack
- Label: Ogam Entertainment

No.	Title	Artist	Length
1.	"니가 떠난 그 자리" (The Place You Left)	MBLAQ	4:09
2.	"니가 떠난 그 자리 (Inst.)" (The Place You Left (Inst.))	MBLAQ	4:09

== Box office ==
Since its domestic release on July 3, 2014, the film has grossed US$2.20 million, with 216,000 ticket sales.

== International release ==
At the Cannes Film Market, Mourning Grave was pre-sold to China, Hong Kong, Taiwan, Singapore and Mongolia.
