= SBS M =

South Korean music channel

- Final logo used from June 2022 to 2025
- Country: South Korea
- Headquarters: Seoul, South Korea

Programming
- Language: Korean

Ownership
- Owner: Channel The Movie Co., Ltd.

History
- Launched: July 2001 (as MTV Korea)
- Closed: May 14, 2025
- Former names: MTV Korea (2001–2011); SBS MTV (2011–2022)

Links
- Website: sbsm.sbs.co.kr

Availability

Streaming media
- SBS Play: Watch live (Korea region only)

SBS M was a South Korean pay television music channel owned by SBS Medianet, a division of SBS Media Holdings. It features South Korean pop artists, international music, news, and a few reality and variety programs.

It was launched in 2001 as the South Korean version of the MTV. In 2011, it came under the SBS Paramount unit, a joint venture of SBS Medianet and Paramount Networks EMEAA and became SBS MTV. In June 2022, SBS and Paramount ceased their joint-venture, and the channel was renamed as SBS M. During its run as SBS MTV, it carried programs originally from the American MTV, along with a few Asian programs of its MTV Asian counterparts.

== History ==
Logo of SBS MTV used between 2011 and 2022.

From 1994 to 1999, MTV, through a partnership deal, showed programs on the CheilJedang group's Mnet network.

In January 2001, the MTV block returned on OnGameNet, then owned by Orion Group's On-Media.

MTV Korea was launched in July 2001 under a joint venture between OnMedia and MTV Networks Asia. Due to poor business performance, it was spun off to form MTV Networks Korea after being acquired by C&M in 2008.

In November 2011, SBS acquired the domestic stake of MTV Networks Korea, thus the company name was changed to SBS Viacom. With this, MTV became a part of SBS, and was renamed to SBS MTV. At this point, the channel had focused more on South Korean talents and original productions such as the longest running The Show. Much like its previous counterpart, it also broadcasts programs from its American counterpart, although those was pushed all the way to the late night schedules.

In 2022, following Paramount Global's (now ended) partnership with TVING to launch the Paramount+ platform in South Korea, it had ended its partnership with SBS Viacom, causing it to change its name to Medianet Plus and rebranded the channel as SBS M from July 1st of that year, now shifting its focus as an entertainment channel airing reruns of Inkigayo and other SBS programs, with the domestic version of Nickelodeon also rebranded as KiZmom. All MTV's shows were also removed from the lineup.

In March 2025, the channel's operating division was spun off from SBS Medianet's Medianet Plus, and in April of the same year, it was sold to Channel The Movie Co., Ltd., becoming excluded from the SBS Medianet group. It appeared that the sale was due to genre overlap issues, as SBS Medianet already had two similar entertainment channels, SBS funE and SBS Plus. On May 13, 2025, the channel ceased its broadcasting, and the last programme to be aired is "THE SHOW", and replaced by the variety channel The M on May 14. Some of its daily programmes was transferred to SBS F!L.

== Shows ==
=== Final programs ===
- SBS Inkigayo
- The Show

=== Former programs ===
- After Hours
- Back to the 90s
- Channel Fiestar
- Fresh: K-pop
- Fresh: Pop
- Hello, Daniel (kor: 안녕, 다니엘)
- Hits: Classic
- I GOT7
- K-pop Star
- KPOP Hero
- KSTAR News 840
- Live 4 U
- Lovelyz in Wonderland (kor: 이상한나라의 러블리즈; Isanghannalaui leobeullijeu)
- MTV Hits
- MTV School Attack
- Running Man
- SBS MTV KPOP 20
- The Stage Big Pleasure
- Treasure Map
- The Trot Show
- Wake Up Call
- Yogobara

== Former VJs ==
- Nara
- Supasize
- Semi
- Seorak
- Kewnsung
- Hongwook
- MC Rhymer
- Seunggwang
- Tim
- G-Ma$ta
- Jungmin
- Hanbyul
- Janet
- Joi
- Sara
- Bin
- Donemany
- Lee Eugene
- Yuri

== See also ==
- MTV
- MTV Networks Asia Pacific
- MTV Southeast Asia
- Mnet (former partner of MTV in South Korea)
- MBC M
