= OCN Movies 2 =

South Korean television channel

- Country: South Korea
- Broadcast area: Throughout South Korea
- Network: CJ E&M Media Content Division
- Headquarters: 66 Sangamsan-ro, Mapo District, Seoul, South Korea

Programming
- Language: Korean
- Picture format: 1080i (HDTV)

Ownership
- Owner: {{ubl|Orion Confectionery (On-Media) (2001-2010)|CJ Group (CJ ENM Entertainment Division) (2010-present)
- Sister channels: OCN; OCN Movies; CATCH ON 1; CATCH ON 2; tvN Movies (Asia); tvN; tvN DRAMA; tvN SHOW; tvN STORY; tvN SPORTS; tvN Asia; Mnet; Chunghwa TV; Tooniverse; Channel Wide; UXN (4K UHD)

History
- Launched: July 1, 2001 (as OCN Action); March 1, 2003 (as Super Action); March 1, 2020 (as OCN Thrills); October 1, 2022 (as OCN Movies 2)
- Former names: {{ubl|OCN Action (July 1, 2001-February 28, 2003)|Super Action (March 1, 2003-February 29, 2020)|OCN Thrills (March 1, 2020-October 1, 2022)

Links
- Website: ocn.cjenm.com/ko

OCN Movies 2 is a television channel in South Korea owned by CJ ENM E&M Division, a division of CJ Group. It was formerly known as OCN Action, Super Action and OCN Thrills. It served as a sister channel to OCN Movies.
