= KiZmom =

South Korean former television channel

- Final logo used form June 30, 2022 to March 30, 2023
- Country: South Korea
- Broadcast area: Nationwide
- Headquarters: Seoul

Programming
- Language: Korean

Ownership
- Owner: SBS Medianet
- Sister channels: SBS M

History
- Launched: c. 2003 (As part of Nickelodeon Asia); November 1, 2005; 21 years ago (As an independent feed); June 30, 2022; 4 years ago (As KiZmom)
- Closed: June 30, 2022; 4 years ago (as Nickelodeon); March 30, 2023; 3 years ago (as KiZmom)
- Replaced by: SBS Golf 2
- Former names: Nickelodeon Asia (2003–2005); Nickelodeon Korea (2005–2022)

Links
- Website: https://web.archive.org/web/20220705224414/https://kizmom.sbs.co.kr/

KiZmom (Korean: 키즈맘) was a South Korean children's and family channel owned by SBS Medianet, a division of SBS Media Holdings.

From 2003 until 2022, the network space was the home to the domestic version of the American channel Nickelodeon before it was transferred to CJ ENM following the deal with Paramount Networks EMEAA.

== History ==
=== Background of Nickelodeon ===
==== Programming on domestic broadcast networks ====
In South Korea, some of original series from Nickelodeon, like Rugrats, Rocket Power, The Wild Thornberrys, SpongeBob SquarePants and Dora the Explorer, were shown on what is now EBS1 (operated by public-service broadcaster EBS). Jimmy Neutron was broadcast on MBC. A localisation of the Nick Jr. Channel's Blue's Clues was shown on KBS2 (of public-sector broadcaster KBS). The Korean version of those series were produced by (or for) the broadcasters themselves, though not specifically branded as block programming under the Nickelodeon name.

==== Nickelodeon block on JEI TV ====
JEI TV (a specialty TV channel owned by JEI Corporation), after making a deal with Viacom, ran a Nickelodeon programming block for years. It started with TV programmes that were not shown on the generalist terrestrial channels. But later, they aired their own Korean dub of what were shown on EBS. Those alternative dubs were produced by Arirang TV Media (a subsidiary of Arirang TV).

==== SkyLife carries Nickelodeon Southeast Asia ====
DTH satellite television provider SkyLife carried the Southeast Asian version of Nickelodeon from 2003 to 2006. A negotiation between SkyLife and On-Media to extend carriage deal was failed, so SkyLife choose Nickelodeon Southeast Asia to replace Tooniverse (then owned by On-Media) on the platform. Test transmission began in January that year, before the formal launch in March. In 2005, as SkyLife and Sony Pictures Television International reached a deal to launch a South Korean version of Animax, it was announced that Nickelodeon Southeast Asia would be removed from the platform in 2006. SkyLife did not carry the new South Korean version of Nickelodeon until 2014.

==== Launch and afterwards ====
Test broadcasts of a dedicated South Korean version of Nickelodeon began on August 1, 2005, before the formal launch in late 2005. This was a result of a deal between On-Media (then owned by Orion Group) and MTV Networks Asia. The channel was initially branded as Nick, and was exclusively available on cable TV providers. A Nickelodeon-branded programming block was also launched on On-Media's Tooniverse around that time.

In November 2008, the channel became a subsidiary of C&M Communication, along with MTV, when On-Media sold a percentage of its shares in On Music Network (which later became MTV Networks Korea). But a Nickelodeon block on Tooniverse continued to go. The channel was officially renamed Nickelodeon in 2010, using the new logo that unveiled months ago in the USA.

In September 2011, SBS, a commercial broadcaster, became the official South Korean partner of Viacom (now re-merged with CBS Corporation to form ViacomCBS in 2019), acquiring shares in MTV Networks Korea from previous South Korean owners and renaming the joint venture SBS Viacom. With this, Nickelodeon became a part of SBS.

=== Rebranding as KiZmom ===
On 30 June 2022, the channel was rebranded as KiZmom, with Nickelodeon content shifting over to CJ ENM's streaming service, TVING, alongside its sister network Tooniverse. SBS MTV also became SBS M on the same day they not longer carried MTV label. The channel wouldn't however last much longer after dropping the Nickelodeon branding as KiZmom would shut down on March 30, 2023, and ended up being replaced by SBS Golf2.

== See also ==
- Tooniverse
- Cartoon Network
- Disney Channel
