= SBS Medianet =

South Korean media company

- Type: Public
- Industry: Media
- Founded: 2000
- Headquarters: Seoul, South Korea
- Products: Television (Cable TV & Non-Free-to-air Channels)
- Owner: SBS Media Holdings (100%)
- Parent: SBS Media Holdings
- Subsidiaries: Medianet Plus LLC
- Website: https://sbsmedianet.sbs.co.kr/

SBS Medianet (Korean: SBS 미디어넷) is a South Korean company by SBS Media Holdings, producing media, broadcast and telecommunication products for non free-to-air networks, including Skylife and 'Cable TV'(KCTA) service providers.

== Television networks ==
- SBS Plus - drama and entertainment programs
- SBS Life - lifestyle type of entertainment programs
- SBS Sports - sport (both professional and amateur)
- SBS Biz - business and news
- SBS funE - entertainment and variety programs
- SBS Golf - golf
- SBS Golf 2 - golf
- SBS NEX - entertainment programs with UHD

Former networks

- KiZmom - children
- SBS M - music

== See also ==
- Economy of South Korea
- List of South Korean companies
- Communications in South Korea
