= SBS Sports =

- Country: South Korea
- Network: SBS
- Headquarters: 11th Floor, 82 SBS Prism Tower, Sangam-dong, Mapo District, Seoul

Programming
- Language: Korean
- Picture format: 1080i (HDTV)

Ownership
- Owner: Seoul Broadcasting System
- Sister channels: SBS Plus; SBS funE; SBS NEX; SBS Golf; SBS Golf 2; SBS Biz

History
- Launched: June 1995
- Former names: Korea Sports TV (1995-2000); SBS Sports Channel (2000-2010); SBS ESPN (2010-2013)

Links
- Website: www.sbs.co.kr/tv/sports

Availability

Streaming media
- SBS Play: Watch live (Korea region only)

SBS Sports is a South Korean pay television sports channel that broadcasts major sports events including the Olympics, FIFA World Cup and professional sports in Korea such as baseball and volleyball. It also broadcasts the Ligue 1, boxing matches and ISU Figure skating matches.

SBS Sports is currently run by CEO Kim Kee-sung.

== History ==
In 1995, the channel was launched as Korea Sports TV by the Korea Sports Promotion Foundation. Five years later, in 2000, it was rebranded as SBS Sports Channel. In 2010, due to a partnership with ESPN, the channel was again rebranded as SBS ESPN. In 2014, the name is reduced to SBS Sports.

== Announcers ==
- Park Sang-joon
- Jin Dal-rae
- Hong Jae-kyung
- Jo Min-ho
- Yoon Sung-ho
- Lee Dong-geun
- Lee Jae-hyung
- Kim Nam-hee
- Jo Jung-shik
- Kim Min-ah
- Yoo Hee-jong
- Kim Se-hee
- Jang Yoo-rye
- Jung Woo-young
- Ahn Hyun-joon
- Kim Se-yeon
- Yeo Eui-joo

== Commentators ==
- Football (SBS TV/RADIO)
  - Ligue 1 Uber Eats+Coupe de France(August 2019–present) - Kim Dong-wan, Park Moon-sung, Jang Ji-hyun, Kee Hwang-jae
Ice skating
- Figure skating - Bang Sang-ah
- Short track speed skating - Jo Hye-ri
- Baseball (SBS TV/RADIO)
  - KBO League - Lee Soon-chul, Ahn Kyung-hyun, Lee Jong-yeol, Choi Won-ho, Seo Jae-weong
  - High school baseball, University baseball - Lee Kwang-kwon
Ice hockey
- Asia League Ice Hockey - Oh Sol-kil
- NHL - Samuel H. Kim
Billiard : Oh Sung-kyoo
Bowling : Oh Il-soo
- Basketball
  - KBL - Park Soo-kyo, Woo Ji-won
  - WKBL
Volleyball : Choi Chun-shik, Lee Sang-yeol, Lee Jong-kyung, Chang So-yun, Kim Sa-nee
Mixed martial arts : Kim Ki-tae
Tennis : Yoo Jin-sun
Boxing : Hong Soo-hwan
Jokgu : Jung Chang-ma

== Programming ==
=== Football ===
- France: Ligue 1, Coupe de France, Coupe de la Ligue, Trophée des Champions
- AFF Championship (2018, 2020, 2022) (Note: All Vietnam matches only in 2018 competition (The 2nd-leg final between Vietnam and Malaysia was co-broadcast with SBS and its 9 regional channels); In the 2020 competition, SBS Sports also broadcast all Indonesia matches in addition to Vietnam matches; In the 2022 competition, SBS Sports also broadcast all Malaysia matches in addition to Vietnam and Indonesia matches)
- Football at the 2019 Southeast Asian Games – Men's tournament (Note: 6 Vietnam matches only- included the final match, shared with SPOTV)
- 2022 FIFA World Cup qualification – AFC second round (Note: 2 Vietnam matches against Malaysia and UAE)
- Audi Cup
- Asian Games
- FIFA World Cup

=== Olympics ===
- Summer Olympic (until 2024)
- Winter Olympic (until 2022)

=== Ice skating ===
- Figure skating
- Short track speed skating

=== Baseball ===
- KBO League
- WBSC Premier12 (2019)

=== Basketball ===
- Korean Basketball League
- Women's Korean Basketball League

=== Volleyball ===
- V-League (both men and women competition)
- FIVB Volleyball World Grand Prix

== See also ==
- SBS Love FM
- XtvN
