= O Shopping =

Defunct television channel in the Philippines

- Headquarters: 9th floor, The Avecshares Center, 1132 University Parkway North, Bonifacio Triangle, Bonifacio Global City, Taguig

Ownership
- Owner: ACJ O Shopping Corporation (a joint-venture of ABS-CBN Corporation and CJ ENM Commerce Division)

History
- Launched: October 14, 2013
- Closed: November 1, 2020

O Shopping was a Philippine pay television channel owned by ACJ O Shopping Corporation, a joint-venture between Philippine entertainment and media conglomerate ABS-CBN Corporation and South Korean home shopping company CJ ENM Commerce Division. The channel was launched on October 14, 2013. O Shopping programs were previously aired on ABS-CBN and Kapamilya Channel during midnights, as well as on PTV, Jeepney TV and ABS-CBN Sports and Action, and online via iWantTFC.

== History ==
O Shopping was launched on October 14, 2013. ABS-CBN Corporation signed a deal with CJ ENM O Shopping Division (formerly CJ O Shopping Corporation) to create a TV home shopping channel in the Philippines. Operated by ACJ O Shopping Corporation, ABS-CBN Corporation invested an initial 200 million pesos for the joint-venture. ABS-CBN provides the media platforms and the production of programs while CJ O Shopping provides the products and the logistics.

Prior to the launch of its standalone channel on ABS-CBN TV Plus on July 30, 2018, O Shopping programs were launched as part of BEAM TV's content lineup in 2014 until October 1, 2018. As of 2016, O Shopping generated 2.2 million pesos in daily sales or 60 million pesos in monthly sales. About 70% of the product purchases on O Shopping are made via cash on delivery payment, with a 5% cancellation rate.

=== Closure ===
O Shopping stopped broadcasting on ABS-CBN Channel 2 on April 21, 2020, due to the COVID-19 pandemic and the enhanced community quarantine in Luzon. The channel also suspended its operations on digital terrestrial television and Cignal. O Shopping was affected by the shutdown of ABS-CBN on May 5 of the same year, due to the cease-and-desist order issued by the National Telecommunications Commission (NTC) and Solicitor General Jose Calida caused by the expiration of ABS-CBN's legislative franchise.

On July 8, 2020, ABS-CBN released a statement that O Shopping would cease operations towards the end of 2020, and CJ-ENM had decided to go out of business completely. The retrenchment of employees was held on August 7. O Shopping ceased its operations on Sky Cable and iWantTFC on November 1, 2020. Meanwhile, the official online store website operated a "Good-BUY Sale" online promo event which lasted until November 15.

O Shopping resumed its airing, this time via Kapamilya Channel, the interim replacement of ABS-CBN, on July 20, 2020. The show concluded its broadcast on October 31, 2020. It was replaced by Movie Central Presents on its timeslot on November 1, 2020.

== See also ==
- DWPM
- DZMM
