= OCN (TV channel) =

- OCN logo
- Country: South Korea
- Broadcast area: Throughout South Korea
- Network: CJ E&M Media Content Division
- Headquarters: 66 Sangamsan-ro, Mapo District, Seoul, South Korea

Programming
- Languages: Korean; English
- Picture format: HDTV 1080i

Ownership
- Owner: Daewoo (1995–99); Orion Confectionery (On-Media) (1999–2010); CJ Group (CJ ENM Entertainment Division) (2010–present)
- Sister channels: OCN Movies; OCN Movies 2; CATCH ON 1; CATCH ON 2; tvN Movies (Asia); tvN; tvN DRAMA; tvN SHOW; tvN STORY; tvN SPORTS; tvN Asia; Mnet; Chunghwa TV; Tooniverse; Channel Wide; UXN (4K UHD)

History
- Launched: March 1, 1995 (as DCN); July 1, 1999 (as OCN)
- Former names: Daewoo Cinema Network (DCN) (March 1, 1995 – June 30, 1999); Orion Cinema Network (1999–2013)

Links
- Website: ocn.cjenm.com/ko

OCN (originally an initialism of the Orion Cinema Network) is a movie channel on basic cable throughout South Korea, owned by CJ ENM E&M Division. In the 2000s, it became the most viewed station in South Korea, which prompted them to create their widely recognized English-language slogan, "Korea number-one channel." With cable TV penetration quite high in South Korea, OCN is a popular movie resource.

OCN's lineup is a mixture of movies from several years ago or earlier, particularly during the daytime, with more recent films during evening prime-time hours. They do not air movies that are as recent as those of sister station CatchOn, a pay service offered on cable TV. They also air episodes of popular overseas television series, mostly from the United States.

== Programs ==
Currently airing TV series
Airtime	Program	Original title	Start date	Notes

=== Viewership ratings ===
- The table below lists the top 15 series with the highest average audience share ratings (nationwide), corresponding episode with highest rating and the date.

Top 15 series per nationwide household rating
#	Series	Nationwide household rating (AGB Nielsen)	Final episode date	Ref.
1	The Uncanny Counter	10.999%	24 January 2021	
2	Voice (season 2)	7.086%	16 September 2018	
3	Watcher	6.585%	25 August 2019	
4	Tunnel	6.490%	21 May 2017	
5	Life on Mars	5.851%	5 August 2018	
6	Player	5.803%	11 November 2018	
7	Voice (season 3)	5.517%	30 June 2019	
8	Voice	5.406%	12 February 2017	
9	Missing: The Other Side	4.811%	11 October 2020	
10	Save Me	4.797%	24 September 2017	
10	Bad Guys: City of Evil	4.797%	4 February 2018	
11	Class of Lies	4.781%	5 September 2019	
12	Squad 38	4.559%	6 August 2016	
13	Team Bulldog: Off-Duty Investigation	4.389%	28 June 2020	
14	Tell Me What You Saw	4.388%	22 March 2020	
15	Black	4.318%	10 December 2017	

- The table below lists the top 10 series with the highest nationwide viewers (million), corresponding episode with highest nationwide viewers and the date.

Top 10 series per nationwide viewers (million) (Note: The number of viewers was released on Nielsen starting January 2018.)
#	Series	Nationwide viewers (AGB Nielsen)	Final episode date	Ref.
1	The Uncanny Counter	3.216	24 January 2021	
2	Voice (season 2)	1.957	16 September 2018	
3	Life on Mars	1.730	5 August 2018	
4	Watcher	1.602	25 August 2019	
5	Voice (season 3)	1.534	30 June 2019	
6	Player	1.515	11 November 2018	
7	Bad Guys: City of Evil	1.307	4 February 2018	
8	Missing: The Other Side	1.257	11 October 2020	
9	Tell Me What You Saw	1.192	22 March 2020	
10	Children of a Lesser God	1.171	April 22, 2018	
11	Team Bulldog: Off-Duty Investigation	1.135	28 June 2020	
