= TvN (Asian TV channel) =

Asian TV channel

tvN
- Country: China
- Broadcast area: Hong Kong; Taiwan; Southeast Asia (Indonesia, Malaysia, Myanmar, Philippines, Singapore, Thailand, Australia); Maldives
- Headquarters: Hong Kong

Programming
- Languages: Korean; Mandarin; Cantonese (Hong Kong and Malaysia only); Malay (Malaysia and Singapore); Indonesian (Indonesia); English (subtitled and in bumpers)
- Picture format: 1080i HDTV

Ownership
- Owner: CJ ENM HK
- Sister channels: tvN Movies; tvN Movies Pinoy (Philippines only)

History
- Launched: 26 October 2009; 3 June 2016 (rebrand as tvN)
- Closed: 2 July 2018 (Vietnam)
- Former names: Channel M (2012–2016)

Links
- Website: tvnasia.net

tvN (formerly Channel M) is a Southeast Asian pay television channel managed by CJ ENM HK. It broadcasts a variety of South Korean TV series and shows from the CJ ENM TV networks (which includes the South Korean channel of the same name, as well as Mnet, OCN and others). number of original shows were made for the Southeast Asian version.

== History ==
=== tvN ===
The channel was launched on October 26, 2009, as tvN before it was rebranded as Channel M (Mnet Asia) on November 23, 2012, which serves K-POP and K-Variety. It reverted back to tvN on June 3, 2016.

The channel is available in the Philippines, where it is distributed by Creative Programs of ABS-CBN Corporation. Their sister cable provider Sky Cable stopped airing the channel in the Philippines starting September 1, 2021. However, it is available through PLDT's Cignal and Smart GigaPlay. (Smart GigaPlay got the Premium Feed before Cignal TV to replace their feed on November 1, 2023) In 2024, tvN was added on TAP Digital Media Ventures Corporation's streaming platform Blast TV, and is distributed by TAP DMV to local pay TV providers in key provinces.

The channel was closed in Vietnam on July 2, 2018 (as tvBlue, although the channel relaunched with content from other broadcasters).

=== tvN Movies ===
The channel was launched in Singapore through Starhub TV on January 11, 2017 at 11am.

With the slogan "Home of Korean Blockbusters", they mostly aired K–Movies, premiering some titles. Titles that aired on the channel include Train to Busan, The Outlaws and its sequel The Roundup, Parasite (which the film won multiple Academy Awards), and most recently The Moon and Concrete Utopia.

In 2023, tvN Movies launched a feed for the Philippines under sub-brand name tvN Movies Pinoy, which airs the same schedule but dubbed in Filipino language.

tvN occasionally aired movies for some markets, specially in Singapore.

== Programming ==
They aired series and shows from tvN and TVING, but doesn't include titles that has been sold to Netflix, Amazon Prime Video or even Disney+ (mostly from Studio Dragon).
