= Ruby Ruby Love =

- Official Poster
- Genre: Web series Rom-com; Fantasy
- Starring: Seohyun; Lee Chul-woo; Lee Yi-kyung
- Country of origin: South Korea
- Original language: Korean
- No. of episodes: 5 (Naver TV Cast (later condensed into one episode on OnStyle)

Production
- Running time: 10-14 minutes (Naver TV Cast, per episode); 50+ minutes (OnStyle, including commercial breaks)
- Production companies: Bl!nk; OnStyle

Original release
- Network: OnStyle; Naver TV Cast
- Release: January 18 – January 26, 2017

Ruby Ruby Love (Korean: 루비루비럽) is a South Korean web series produced for the fashion and lifestyle pay TV channel OnStyle, starring Seohyun, Lee Chul-woo and Lee Yi-kyung. The first two episodes of the web drama were released on Naver TV Cast on January 18, 2017, and the final episode on January 26, 2017. It was later broadcast on OnStyle as a drama special on January 27, 2017.

== Plot ==
The story follows Ruby Lee (이루비) (portrayed by Seohyun), a genius young woman who suffers from sociophobia but comes across a magic ring that helps her become a successful jewelry designer.

== Cast ==
- Seohyun as Lee Ruby
- Lee Chul-woo as Won Suk, Ruby's one and only friend
- Lee Yi-kyung as Na Ji-suk, CEO of a jewelry enterprise
- Ji Hye-ran as Yoo Bi-joo
- Hwang Seok-jeong as Dan Ho-bak

== International broadcast ==
Country	Network	Airing dates
Thailand	Channel 9 MCOT HD	July 5, 2017 – July 19, 2017
