= Project Runway Korea =

South Korean reality television series

- Logo
- Hangul: 프로젝트 런웨이 코리아
- RR: Peurojekteu reonwei Koria
- MR: P'ŭrojekt'ŭ rŏnwei K'oria
- Created by: Eli Holzman
- Starring: Lee So-ra (2009-); Kan Ho-sup (2009-12); Shin Yoo-jin (2009-10); Kim Seok-won (2009-); Jeon Mi-Gyeong (2011-); Jung Goo-ho (2013-)
- Country of origin: South Korea
- Original language: Korean
- No. of seasons: 5
- No. of episodes: 59

Production
- Running time: 60 minutes

Original release
- Network: OnStyle
- Release: February 7, 2009 – May 18, 2015

Project Runway Korea (Korean: 프로젝트 런웨이 코리아) was the South Korean version of the American reality show Project Runway. It was Korean television's first localized franchise from a foreign-language reality competition, and the third Project Runway version in Asia after Malaysia and the Philippines.

The winner of Project Runway Korea's first season received ₩50 million in prize money, along with a car and a fashion spread in Elle Korea; the second season increased the prize money to ₩70 million.

The show's fifth and final season, an All Stars Season, concluded in May 2015.

== Production ==
The show is hosted by Lee So-ra, supermodel, together with Editor-in-Chief of ELLE Korea Shin Yoo-jin and ANDY & DEBB designer Kim Seok-won completing the judging panel. Meanwhile, fashion design professor Kan Ho-sup serves as mentor to the designers. Lee replaced Kang Ho-dong (comedian and variety show host), who was the choice to host Project Runway Korea, as FremantleMedia (international distributor of the Project Runway franchise) found it inappropriate to have a comedian in a fashion-related program. Over 500 designers auditioned, and 14 of them were chosen as finalists. The final three designers will get the chance to show their collection in the 2009 Fall/ Winter Seoul Collection, with the winner receiving 50 million won (roughly US$34,200), a 2009 GM Daewoo Lacetti and a fashion spread in ELLE Korea. The show premiered on cable network OnStyle on February 7, 2009.

News reports stated that the production company of Project Runway Korea paid 100 million won (roughly US$71,900) to purchase the franchise, which included a 700-page "bible" that details the program's format, production notes, and casting procedures. The whole season is said to have been produced at a budget of 700 million won (roughly US$506,100) for all of its 10 episodes, compared to Project Runway that has a production budget of 500 million won (roughly US$361,500) for every episode.

During the promotion of the program, the staff of Project Runway Korea stated that "everything about (Project Runway and its Korean version) is the same except for the color of the contestants' skin."

The first season will feature appearances from celebrity Uhm Jung-hwa, fashion photographer Gilles Bensimon, and designer from Project Runway's fourth season Victorya Hong, who incidentally has Korean lineage.

As of Season 4, the show has begun filming in an HDTV format.

== Season 1 ==
Project Runway Korea's host Lee So-ra (foreground) together with 14 designers competing in the program

Names of the designers are arranged in "Romanized" order, while the ages listed are the designers' ages at the time the show was taped in late 2008.

Contestant	Age	Place Finished
Kye Han-hee	21	14th
Lee Eun-jeong	37	13th
Kim Hong-bum	30	12th
So Ye-in	25	11th
Yoo Sang-wook	27	10th
Kyung Cho-rong	28	9th
Shin Jae-eun	41	8th
Kim Jae-min	21	7th
Lee Myung-sin	22	6th
Jung Jae-woong	25	5th
Lee Seung-hee	33	4th
Choi Hye-jung	28	2nd Runner-up
Nam Yong-seop	29	1st Runner-up
Lee Woo-kyung	26	Winner

Designer Elimination Chart
Designer	1	2	3	4	5	6	7	8	9	11	Eliminated Episode
Lee Woo-kyung	WIN	IN	IN	IN	IN	LOW	LOW	HIGH	WIN	WINNER	11 - Finale
Nam Yong-seop	IN	IN	WIN	IN	LOW	HIGH	LOW	WIN	HIGH	RUNNER-UP	11 - Finale
Choi Hye-jung	IN	IN	IN	HIGH	IN	LOW	HIGH	LOW	LOW	3RD PLACE	11 - Finale
Lee Seung-hee	HIGH	LOW	LOW	HIGH	LOW	IN	WIN	HIGH	OUT		9 - Korean Soul
Jung Jae-woong	IN	HIGH	HIGH	IN	HIGH	WIN	HIGH	LOW	OUT		9 - Korean Soul
Lee Myung-sin	IN	IN	LOW	WIN	WIN	IN	HIGH	OUT			8 - Absolute Esthetics of Ballerinas
Kim Jae-min	LOW	IN	LOW^{1}	LOW	HIGH	HIGH	OUT				7 - Hello! Africa!
Shin Jae-eun	IN	IN	IN	LOW	IN	OUT					6 - Try To Follow Me
Kyung Cho-rong	IN	LOW	HIGH	IN	OUT						5 - Resort Project
Yoo Sang-wook	LOW	WIN	IN	OUT							4 - Bag Transformation
So Ye-in	IN	IN	OUT								3 - Sedan Above Design
Kim Hong-bum	HIGH	LOW	OUT								3 - Sedan Above Design
Lee Eun-jung	LOW	OUT									2 - Standard Of Party
Kye Han-hee	OUT										1 - Welcome To The Runway

The designer won Project Runway Korea.
The designer won that challenge.
The designer was in the top two, but did not win.
The designer had one of the highest scores for that challenge, but did not win.
The designer had one of the lowest scores for that challenge, but was not eliminated.
The designer was in the bottom two, but was not eliminated.
The designer lost and was out of the competition.

- ^Note 1: Kim Jae-min's team had one of the highest scores but because of his attitude, he was on the bottom 5.

== Season 2 ==
Contestant	Age	Place Finished
Lee Hyun-shik	31	15th
Lee Jae-hoon	25	14th
Hyun Sung-shik	32	13th
Yoon Se-na	30	12th
Lee Dong-jun	22	11th
Jung Ga-young	23	10th
Bang Ji-eun	25	9th
Jung Hyun-joo	29	8th
Choi Chang-sook	36	7th
An Song-eun	22	6th
Yoon Choon-ho	27	5th
Kim Ji-hye	31	4th
Jung Mi-young	30	2nd Runner-up
Choi Hyoung-wook	30	1st Runner-up
Jung Go-woun	25	Winner

Designer Elimination Chart
Designer	1	2	3	4	5	6	7^{1}	8	9	10	12	Eliminated Episode
Jung Go-woun	WIN	WIN	IN	IN	IN	HIGH	WIN	LOW	HIGH	HIGH	WINNER	12 - Finale
Choi Hyoung-wook	HIGH	IN	IN	LOW	WIN	WIN	LOW	LOW	LOW	LOW	RUNNER-UP	12 - Finale
Jung Mi-young	IN	HIGH	HIGH	WIN	LOW	IN	LOW	WIN	LOW	WIN	3RD PLACE	12 - Finale
Kim Ji-hye	IN	HIGH	IN	HIGH	IN	HIGH	LOW	LOW	HIGH	OUT		10 - Capital of Design
Yoon Choon-ho	IN	IN	WIN	IN	LOW	LOW	LOW	HIGH	WIN	OUT		10 - Capital of Design
An Song-eun	IN	IN	IN	LOW	IN	LOW	LOW	HIGH	OUT			9 - Preety Women, Lovely Couple
Choi Chang-sook	IN	IN	LOW	HIGH	HIGH	IN	LOW	OUT				8 - Hiphoper's Wedding Crasher
Jung Hyun-joo	LOW	IN	IN	HIGH	HIGH	IN	OUT					7 – 101 Purple Bloom
Bang Ji-eun	IN	LOW	IN	IN	IN	OUT						6 - Imigination : The Car
Jung Ga-young	LOW	IN	LOW	IN	OUT							5 - Heel is Finish of Couture
Lee Dong-jun	IN	IN	IN	OUT								4 - Christine, Yesterday & Today
Yoon Se-na	HIGH	LOW	HIGH	OUT								4 - Christine, Yesterday & Today
Hyun Sung-shik	IN	IN	OUT									3 - Warming Rainy Day
Lee Jae-hoon	IN	OUT										2 - Fashionista's Going Out
Lee Hyun-shik	OUT											1 - Master of Recycling

The designer won Project Runway Korea.
The designer won that challenge.
The designer was in the top two, but did not win.
The designer had one of the highest scores for that challenge, but did not win.
The designer had one of the lowest scores for that challenge, but was not eliminated.
The designer was in the bottom two, but was not eliminated.
The designer lost and was out of the competition.

- ^Note 1: Two team's teamwork are worst. And all of contestants are critiqued.

== Season 3 ==
Contestant	Age	Place Finished
Lee Hak-lim	33	15th
Lee Tae-kyung	27	14th
Jeon Ju-hyun	27	13th
Jung Nok-young	25	12th
Hong Ji-sun	23	11th
Gwon Bo-mi	27	10th
Jo Seo-young	32	9th
Jo Hang-yong	24	8th
Hwang Jae-geun	34	7th
Kim Won-shik	26	6th
Jung Hee-jin	27	5th
Kim Jin	32	4th
Lee Se-jin	24	2nd Runner-up
Gwon Soon-soo	24	1st Runner-up
Shin Joo-yeon	24	Winner

Designer Elimination Chart
Designer	1	2	3	4	5	6	7	8	9	10	12	Eliminated Episode
Shin Joo-yeon	WIN	LOW	IN	IN	HIGH	HIGH	IN	WIN	LOW	HIGH	WINNER	12 - Finale
Gwon Soon-soo	IN	HIGH	WIN	IN	IN	LOW	WIN	IN	LOW	WIN	RUNNER-UP	12 - Finale
Lee Se-jin	IN	HIGH	HIGH	HIGH	IN	IN	IN	HIGH	LOW	LOW	3RD PLACE	12 - Finale
Kim Jin	HIGH	IN	HIGH	HIGH	IN	WIN	LOW	LOW	LOW	OUT		9 - Meaning The Motor Clothing / 10 - Love, I Love You
Jung Hee-jin	IN	LOW	IN	IN	IN	IN	HIGH	LOW	LOW^{1}	OUT		9 - Meaning The Motor Clothing / 10 - Love, I Love You
Kim Won-shik	IN	IN	IN	LOW	LOW	HIGH	HIGH	HIGH	WIN	OUT		9 - Meaning The Motor Clothing / 10 - Love, I Love You
Hwang Jae-geun	HIGH	LOW	IN	WIN	HIGH	IN	LOW	OUT				8 - Invite The Latin Continent
Jo Hang-yong	IN	LOW	LOW	LOW	WIN	LOW	OUT					7 - Stage Shock
Jo Seo-young	IN	IN	IN	IN	LOW	OUT						6 - Blue Jeans Being Beautiful
Gwon Bo-mi	IN	IN	IN	IN	OUT							5 - Only My Jewels
Hong Ji-sun	IN	WIN	LOW	OUT								4 - Toy Madness
Jung Nok-young	LOW	HIGH	OUT									3 - Spring Scent For Her
Jeon Ju-hyun	IN	OUT										2 - Café Non-Standard
Lee Tae-kyung	LOW	OUT										2 - Café Non-Standard
Lee Hak-lim	OUT											1 - If I Becomes Top 3?

The designer won Project Runway Korea.
The designer won that challenge.
The designer was in the top two, but did not win.
The designer had one of the highest scores for that challenge, but did not win.
The designer had one of the lowest scores for that challenge, but was not eliminated.
The designer was in the bottom two, but was not eliminated.
The designer lost and was out of the competition.

- ^Note 1: Jung Hee-jin was eliminated at panel, but was saved. Because all of contestants are critiqued.

== Season 4 ==
Contestant	Age	Place Finished
Jung Ji-eun	31	15th
Kim Sung-gwon	28	14th
Kim Min-ji	23	13th
Lim Je-yoon	22	12th
Park So-hyun	29	11th
Kim Gyung-mi	30	10th
Gi Yoon-ha	24	9th
Kim Sung-hyun	23	8th
Kim Jae-woong	21	7th
Gang Sung-do	27	6th
An Jae-hyun	29	5th
Jo A-ra	26	4th
Oh Yu-kyung	25	2nd Runner-up
Lee Ji-seung	28	1st Runner-up
Kim Hye-ran	30	Winner

Designer Elimination Chart
Designer	2	3	4	5	6	7	8	9	10	11	12	13	Eliminated Episode
Kim Hye-ran	LOW	HIGH	IN	HIGH	IN	WIN	IN	WIN	IN	LOW	WIN	WINNER	13 - Finale
Lee Ji-seung	IN	WIN	IN	IN	HIGH	LOW	HIGH	HIGH	WIN	WIN	HIGH	RUNNER-UP	13 - Finale
Oh Yu-kyung	LOW	IN	IN	HIGH	IN	IN	IN	IN	HIGH	HIGH	LOW	3RD PLACE	13 - Finale
Jo A-ra	HIGH	IN	WIN	IN	IN	IN	WIN	HIGH	LOW	HIGH	OUT		12 - Fashion Herb City
An Jae-hyun	IN	IN	IN	IN	LOW	LOW	IN	IN	HIGH	LOW	OUT		12 - Fashion Herb City
Gang Sung-do	WIN	IN	IN	LOW	IN	HIGH	HIGH	LOW	LOW	OUT			11 - Fashion Outline
Kim Jae-woong	IN	LOW	HIGH	IN	HIGH	HIGH	LOW	LOW	OUT				10 - My Lucky Cast
Kim Sung-hyun	HIGH	IN	HIGH	LOW	LOW	HIGH	LOW	OUT					9 - Fashionikids VVIP
Gi Yoon-ha	IN	LOW	LOW	IN	WIN	LOW	OUT						8 - See The Future of Runway
Kim Gyung-mi	LOW	IN	IN	WIN	IN	OUT							7 - Driver Gentleness
Park So-hyun	HIGH	IN	LOW	IN	OUT								6 - Red Carpet Goddess
Lim Je-yoon	HIGH	HIGH	IN	OUT									5 - Hard-Wear
Kim Min-ji	IN	IN	OUT										4 - Collects The Light Of Amethyst
Kim Sung-gwon	LOW	OUT											3 - The Heroes of Pyongchang
Jung Ji-eun	OUT												1 - Fall Off The Party ^{1} / 2 - Wonder Designer

The designer won Project Runway Korea.
The designer won that challenge.
The designer was in the top two, but did not win.
The designer had one of the highest scores for that challenge, but did not win.
The designer had one of the lowest scores for that challenge, but was not eliminated.
The designer was in the bottom two, but was not eliminated.
The designer lost and was out of the competition.

- ^Note 1: In episode 1, Nam Bo-ra, Park Jung-sang, Back Ye-jin, Lee Kyung-hae, and Jung Yong-jin were the 5 designers who were eliminated before the final 15 were officially participants of the show.

== All-STARS ==
Contestant	Age	Original Season	Original Ranked	Place Finished
Jung Jae-woong	30	Season 1	5th	12th
Jo A-ra	28	Season 4	4th	11th
Oh Yu-Kyung	27	Season 4	2nd Runner-up	10th
Choi Chang-sook	40	Season 2	7th	9th
Nam Yong-seop	34	Season 1	1st Runner-up	8th
Hyun Sung-shik	36	Season 2	13th	7th
Kim Sung-hyun	25	Season 4	8th	6th
Jung Mi-young	34	Season 2	2nd Runner-up	5th
Yoon Se-na	34	Season 2	12th	4th
Lim Je-yoon	24	Season 4	12th	2nd Runner-Up
Lee Myung-sin	27	Season 1	6th	1st Runner-Up
Hwang Jae-geun	37	Season 3	7th	Winner

Designer Elimination Chart
	1	2	3	4	5	6	7	8	9	10	11	Eliminated Episode
Hwang Jae-geun	IN	HIGH	HIGH	WIN	LOW	HIGH	LOW	HIGH	HIGH	WIN	WINNER	11 - Finale
Lee Myung-sin	WIN	LOW^{2}	IN	IN	WIN	LOW	HIGH	HIGH	WIN	LOW	RUNNER-UP	11 - Finale
Lim Je-yoon	HIGH	LOW^{2}	IN	IN	HIGH	HIGH	HIGH	LOW	HIGH	HIGH	3RD PLACE	11 - Finale
Yoon Se-na	IN	HIGH	WIN	LOW	IN	WIN	IN	LOW	LOW	OUT		10 - Cause and Effect
Jung Mi-young	IN	LOW	IN	HIGH	HIGH	LOW^{3}	LOW	WIN	OUT			9 - Feather Magic
Kim Sung-hyun	LOW	LOW	LOW	LOW	LOW	LOW	WIN	OUT				8 - Bag Hi-End
Hyun Sung-shik	IN	HIGH	IN	IN	IN	HIGH	OUT					7 - Dog-Healing Life
Nam Yong-seop	HIGH	HIGH	HIGH	IN	IN	OUT						6 - Ultimate Paper Couture
Choi Chang-sook	IN	LOW	LOW	HIGH	OUT							5 - Korean Women President
Oh Yu-Kyung	IN	HIGH	IN	OUT								4 - Make-Up Extreme
Jo A-ra	LOW	WIN	OUT									3 - Brand New Boy
Jung Jae-woong	LOW^{1}	OUT										1 - Mistakes Breed Success / 2 - Princess Twist

The designer won Project Runway Korea.
The designer won that challenge.
The designer was in the top two, but did not win.
The designer had one of the highest scores for that challenge, but did not win.
The designer had one of the lowest scores for that challenge, but was not eliminated.
The designer was in the bottom two, but was not eliminated.
The designer lost and was out of the competition.

- ^Note 1:Jung Jae-woong was eliminated at panel, but was saved. Because judges thought that he had potential, and stayed in the competition.
- ^Note 2:Lee Myung-sin & Lim Je-yoon's design was considered good even though they are received a low score to lose the battle.
- ^Note 3:Jung Mi-young's design was considered good even though her group received a low score.

== References in popular culture ==
On March 28, 2009, Infinite Challenge, the top-rating comic-variety programme in South Korea, broadcast a special episode titled "Project RunAway" (프로젝트 런어웨이) (episode 147) to test each of the member's commercial design ability, with the host of PRK, Lee So-ra. The main challenge given to each member was made by comedian Kim Gyeong-min's request, to design his comic dress to wear at the MBC's variety programme Happy-Time. At last, surprisingly, the winner of this neck-and-neck competition is Park Myung-soo by the judges' rock paper scissors decision. This free-to-air episode also marked the highest ratings of the series.
