= TVB Korea Channel =

South Korean television channel

- Broadcast area: South Korea
- Headquarters: 77 Chun Choi Street, Tseung Kwan O Industrial Estate, New Territories, Hong Kong

Programming
- Language: Korean

Ownership
- Owner: TVB

History
- Launched: March 2008 (testing); June 2008 (broadcast)
- Closed: June 2016

Links
- Website: http://www.tvb.co.kr/ (dead site)

TVB Korea Channel (TVBK; Chinese: TVB Korea頻道; Korean: TVB 코리아) is a joint television channel of Central Multi Broadband (CMB) of South Korea and Hong Kong's TVB (International) Limited (TVBI). The channel is broadcast in Korean.

== History ==
TVB Korea Channel is a joint television channel with CMB and TVBI. The channel mainly broadcasts the television dramas produced by TVB from Hong Kong. The channel is under testing since March 2008 and officially broadcasting since June 2008. Around 9 million cable TV users in South Korea watch the channel.

== Programming ==
The channel's audience is mainly Koreans, as it airs mostly imported television dramas from Hong Kong, dubbed into Korean. TVB Korea also broadcasts programming from Japan, Taiwan and mainland China.

== See also ==
- Chunghwa TV
