= TvN Story =

South Korean TV channel

tvN STORY
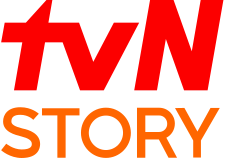
- Country: South Korea
- Headquarters: Seoul

Programming
- Language: Korean

Ownership
- Owner: CJ ENM Entertainment Division
- Sister channels: tvN; tvN DRAMA; tvN SHOW; tvN SPORTS; Mnet; OCN; OCN Movies; OCN Thrills; CATCH ON 1; CATCH ON 2; Tooniverse; Chunghwa TV; UXN (4K UHD)

History
- Launched: June 1, 2000; 25 years ago (as Channel F)
- Replaced: Olive (first iteration) and OnStyle

Links
- Website: tving.com

tvN STORY is a South Korean cable and satellite television channel owned by CJ ENM E&M Division. The channel is targeted to women, originate from OnStyle.

Former logo used from 2017 to 2021.

== Programs ==
- Project Runway Korea (February 7, 2009 – May 18, 2015)
- Korea's Next Top Model (September 18, 2010 – November 1, 2014
- Get It Beauty (season 4-13; July 14, 2010 - 2020)
  - Studio GB (September 25, 2020 - April 2021; started May 2021, it moved to Olive.)
- Jessica & Krystal (June 3, 2014 – August 5, 2014)
- The TaeTiSeo (August 26, 2014 – October 21, 2014)
- Hyoyeon's One Million Likes (June 11, 2015 – August 14, 2015)
- Channel Girls' Generation (July 21, 2015 – September 8, 2015)
- dailyTaeng9Cam (October 24, 2015 – November 21, 2015)
- Channel AOA (March 22, 2016 – May 17, 2016)
- Laundry Day (October 22, 2016 – January 7, 2017)
- Lipstick Prince (December 1, 2016 – June 2, 2017)
- Charm TV
- Hyoyeon's Ten Million Likes (December 19, 2016 – February 6, 2017)
- Seohyun's Home (혼자 살아보니 어때?; February 8, 2017 – March 8, 2017)
- Now, Follow Me (이젠 날 따라와; September 23, 2022 – November 18, 2022)

=== Drama ===
- My First Time (October 7, 2015 – November 25, 2015)
- Beautiology 101 (Finished)
- Ruby Ruby Love (January 18, 2017 - January 26, 2017 (online)/January 27, 2017 (one-episode drama special))
