= On-Media =

South Korean broadcasting company

ON Media Corporation (Korean: 온 미디어; "Orion Network Media"), is a South Korean broadcasting company. Formerly a subsidiary of Korean food company Orion Confectionery and conglomerate company Tongyang Group and Kumho Asiana Group, it was acquired by the CJ Group in 2010. Established in 2000, the company is headquartered in Seongnam, Gyeonggi Province and is a leader in the pay television industry in South Korea. On-Media also delivers cable TV and broadband services.

== Television networks ==
=== Present ===
- Badook TV (바둑TV)
- Catch On (캐치온)
- Catch On Plus (캐치온 플러스)
- OnStyle (온스타일)
- Ongamenet (온게임넷)
- Orion Cinema Network (OCN)
- Story On (스토리온)
- Super Action (슈퍼액션)
- Tooniverse (투니버스)

=== Former ===
- MTV Korea (MTV 코리아

== See also ==
- Orion Confectionery
- Kumho Asiana Group
