= CJ ENM Commerce Division =

- Trade name: CJ OnStyle
- Native name: 씨제이이엔엠 커머스 부문
- Formerly: Home Shopping Television (1994–1999); 39 Shopping (1999–2000); CJ 39 Shopping (2000–2002); CJ Home Shopping (2002–2009); CJ O Shopping (2009–2018)
- Company type: Division
- Traded as: KRX: 035760 (Note: now used by CJ ENM)
- Founded: December 16, 1994; 30 years ago in Seoul, South Korea
- Founder: CJ Group
- Successor: CJ ENM (as a standalone public company)
- Headquarters: CJ OnStyle (870-13, Gwacheon-ro, Seocho-gu, Seoul) Commerce Division Gangnam Branch (4th floor Hwanghwa Building, 320, Gangnam-daero, Gangnam-gu, Seoul) Commerce Division Busan Branch (6th floor Jese Building, 1091, Jungang-daero, Yeonje-gu, Busan)
- Areas served: South Korea; China; India; Japan; Vietnam; Thailand; Turkey; Philippines; Mexico
- Key people: Yoon Sang-hyun (CEO)
- Parent: CJ Group (1994–2018); CJ ENM (2018–present)
- Website: company.cjonstyle.com/mobile/index.asp

CJ OnStyle
- Country: South Korea
- Broadcast area: Korea

Programming
- Language(s): Korean
- Picture format: 1080i (HDTV)

Ownership
- Owner: CJ ENM Commerce Division (CJ Group)

History
- Launched: 1995; 30 years ago

CJ ENM Commerce Division (Korean: 씨제이이엔엠 커머스 부문; trading as CJ OnStyle) is a South Korean commerce division of CJ Group.

In July 2018, CJ O Shopping merged with CJ E&M to create a new company CJ ENM.

== History ==
CJ O Shopping, CJ's cable home shopping channel, entered China in 2004, India in 2009, Japan and Vietnam in 2011, Thailand (together with GMM Grammy) and Turkey in 2012, the Philippines (together with ABS-CBN) in 2013, and Mexico (together with Televisa) in 2015.

In 2018, it was announced that CJ E&M would be merging with CJ O Shopping, creating a new company.

== See also ==
- CJ Group
