= Got7 videography =

Got7 video discography
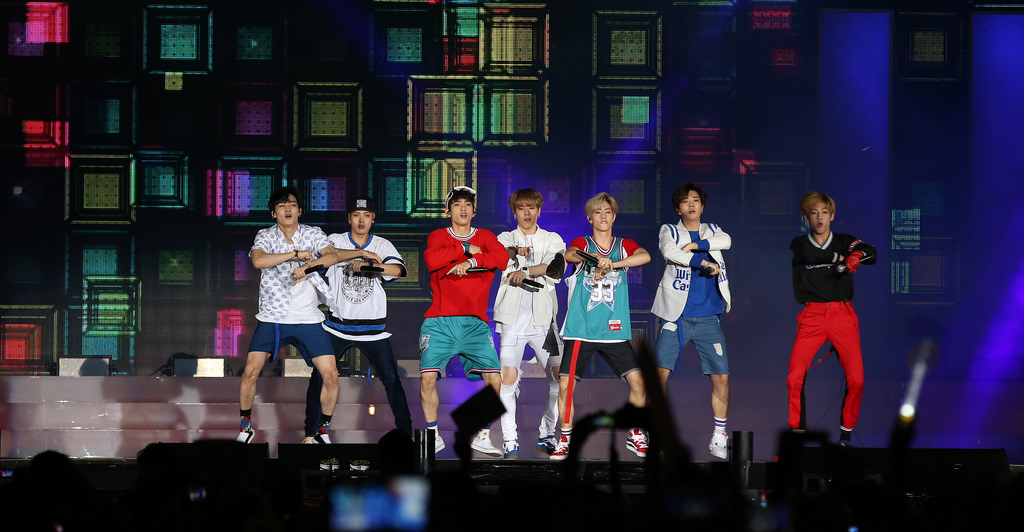
- Got7 performing Just Right at the 2015 Summer K-POP Festival. From left to right: Jay B, Jackson, Jinyoung, Yugyeom, Mark, Youngjae, BamBam
- Music videos: 35
- Dramas: 1
- Variety: 6
- Web series: 15

This is the videography of Got7, a K-pop boy group. Got7 has released a total of 35 music videos, four seasons of a YouTube reality series, and a web drama, Dream Knight, which gained 13 million views by its fourth episode. Additionally, the group has been shown to have strong variety skills though their TV variety program I Got7.

== Music videos ==
Year	Title	Director	Ref.
Korean
2014	"Girls Girls Girls"	Kim Young-jo, Yoo Joon-seok (Naive Creative Production)	
2014	"A"	Kim Young-jo, Yoo Joon-seok (Naive Creative Production)	
2014	"Stop Stop It" (하지하지마; Hajihajima)	Kim Young-jo, Yoo Joon-seok (Naive Creative Production)	
2015	"Just Right" (딱 좋아; Ttak joh-a)	Kim Young-jo, Yoo Joon-seok (Naive Creative Production)	
2015	"If You Do" (니가 하면; Niga hamyeon)	Kim Young-jo, Yoo Joon-seok (Naive Creative Production)	
2015	"Confession Song" (고백송; Gobaeksong)	Kim Young-jo, Yoo Joon-seok (Naive Creative Production)	
2016	"Fly"	Kim Young-jo, Yoo Joon-seok (Naive Creative Production)	
2016	"Hard Carry" (하드캐리; Hadeukaeri)	OJun Kwon (AR Film)	
2017	"Never Ever"	OJun Kwon (AR Film)	
2017	"You Are"	Lee Gi-baek (Tiger Cave)	
2018	"Look"	Naive Creative Production	
2018	"Lullaby"	Naive Creative Production	
2018	"Miracle"	Naive Creative Production	
2019	"Eclipse"	Naive Creative Production	
2019	"You Calling My Name"	Doori Kwak (GDW)	
2020	"Not By The Moon"	Hobin (A Hobin Film)	
2020	"Breath"	Bang Jae-yeob	
2020	"Last Piece"	Bang Jae-yeob	
2021	"Encore"	Mamesjao	
2022	"Nanana"	Hiijack	
2025	"Python"	NOVV KIM	
Japanese
2014	"Around the World"	Taku Igarashi	
2015	"Love Train"	Jimmy (BS Pictures)	
2015	"Laugh Laugh Laugh"	Jimmy (BS Pictures)	
2016	"Hey Yah"	Jimmy (BS Pictures)	
2017	"My Swagger"	Jimmy (BS Pictures)	
2017	"My Swagger (Dance Ver.)"	Jimmy (BS Pictures)	
2017	"Turn Up"	Jimmy (BS Pictures)	
2018	"Meet Me"	Unknown	
2018	"THE New Era"	Unknown	
2018	"I Won't Let You Go"	Unknown	
2019	"I Won't Let You Go" (Vertical Ver.)	Unknown	
2019	"Love Loop"	Seong Wonmo (Digipedi)	
2019	"Love Loop" (Vertical Ver.)	Seong Wonmo (Digipedi)	
2019	"Sing for U" (Memorial Ver.)	Unknown	

== Dramas ==
Year	Title	Members	Note	Ref.
2015	Dream Knight	All	Online drama by JYPE and Youku Tudou	

Produced by JYP Entertainment and Youku Tudou, Dream Knight is a fantasy romance web drama which premiered on January 27, 2015, and ran for 12 episodes until March 5, 2015. Each episode lasts around 12–15 minutes, with the final episode being 23 minutes in total. The series revolves around an orphaned, bullied high school girl, Joo In-hyeong, played by Song Ha-yoon, who suffers from a terminal illness. Her bleak, solitary life starts to look better when she is suddenly befriended by a group of mysterious boys, played by members of Got7, who provide her with happiness, love, support and friendship. Unbeknownst to In-hyeong, the four knights possess magical powers and are on a mission to protect and care for her, until an unexpected discovery threatens their loyalty. The drama features many famous faces, with Miss A's Min starring in a lead role, and cameos by comedian Lee Guk-joo, 2PM's Chansung, Park Ji-min (15&), as well as JYP Entertainment's founder J.Y. Park, and actor Choi Woo-shik.

== Web series and TV shows ==
Year	Title	Channel	Notes	Ref.
2014	I Got7	SBS MTV		
2014	Got7 now	Facebook		
2014	Real Got7	YouTube		
2014	Real Got7 season 2	YouTube		
2015	Real Got7 season 3	YouTube, V Live		
2016	Got7ing	V Live		
2016	Got2Day	YouTube		
2016	Got2Day 2016	YouTube, V Live		
2016	Got7's Hard Carry	Mnet		
2016	Got the Stage	YouTube		
2017	Got7ing+	V Live CH+		
2017	Got7 Jackson Show	V Live CH+		
2017	Real Got7 season 4	V Live		
2017	Got7ing+: 7 for 7	V Live CH+		
2017	Got2Day 2017 Live	V Live		
2017	#3 minutes Got7	YouTube, V Live		
2017	Got7 X Happiness Train	V Live		
2017	Idolity: Got7's TMI Lab	Mnet		
2018	Got7: On The Scene	YouTube		
2018	Got7 Studio	YouTube		
2018	Got7 Working Eat Holiday in Jeju	V Live		
2018	Got7 X LieV	V Live		
2018	Got7's Hard Carry 2	Mnet		
2018	Got7 Monograph "Present: You"	YouTube, V Live		
2018	Lyric ASMR	YouTube		
2019	Got7's Real Thai	XtvN	Mark, Jinyoung, Youngjae, and BamBam	
2019	Got7 Tourgraph	YouTube, V Live		
2019	Got7_Page	YouTube, V Live		
2019	Got7 Monograph "Spinning Top: Between Security & Insecurity"	YouTube, V Live		
2019	Got2Day 2019	YouTube, V Live		
2019	Got7 Golden Key	STATV, YouTube	Mark and Youngjae	
2019	Got7 Tourlog	YouTube, V Live		
2019	Got7 Monograph "Fan Fest 2019 Seven Secrets"	YouTube, V Live		
2019	Got7 Monograph "Call My Name"	YouTube, V Live		
2019	Got7 Hotline	YouTube, V Live		
2019	Got7's Hard Carry 2.5	Mnet		
2020	Got7 Offline	YouTube, V Live		
2020	Got7 Monograph "Dye"	YouTube, V Live		
2020	Got7 Dyeary	YouTube, V Live		
2020	Gotoon by Got7 Summer Store	YouTube, V Live		
2020	Got7 Monograph "Breath of Love: Last Piece"	YouTube, V Live		
2020	Got7 "Piece of Got7"	YouTube, V Live		

Real Got7 and Got2DAY

Got7's company JYP Entertainment has produced four seasons of a reality YouTube series, Real Got7, that provides a different view of the members as they go about various activities. The episodes were uploaded onto the official JYP Entertainment YouTube Channel and include English subtitles. Each season consists of ten episodes that vary in length. In season 1, the first several episodes show the members getting ready for the group's debut with later episodes showing the members having fun together in various locations. Season 2 introduced a "secret angel" game, with each member randomly choosing another to take care of during the promotion period for Got7's song "A". Most of the second season's episodes were focused on the members' behind the scenes actions at events such as fan-signs, music programs, and photo shoots.

Due to the group attending numerous overseas activities, season 3 was shot with at least one extended break between episodes 5 and 6. Season 3 was later made available to purchase on DVD. The DVD set came with bonus material, including previously unreleased footage, 3 making-of videos, and 21 episodes of Got2DAY, a series that had each member participate in an open talk with each of the other members. A second series of Got2DAY was released in Autumn 2016 on Naver V Live, and later on Got7's official YouTube channel. The Got2DAY concept returned in late 2017, but, instead of being pre-recorded, were live broadcasts through the Naver V Live application.

Real Got7 returned for a fourth series in Spring 2017, following a similar format and pattern to the previous three seasons. The ten episodes, each approximately around 20 minutes, were uploaded on Got7's official YouTube channel and Naver V Live. In 2019, Got2DAY 2019 debuted on YouTube and V Live.

Got7ing

In March 2016, the group began a new reality series called Got7ing, which was distributed through Naver's V-live phone app; unlike the majority of other content on the app, the episodes were each pre-filmed and edited. The episodes were also made available on the application's online site, and were later uploaded onto Got7's official YouTube channel.

A later version of this series, Got7ing+, was available to subscribers of the official Got7 CH+ channel on Naver V Live.

Got7's Hard Carry

In October 2016, Got7 began starring in their own reality television show, Got7's Hard Carry, hosted by Mnet. The series ran for ten weeks and was broadcast weekly on Mnet's television channel and through Naver V Live. As well as releasing teasers online before each episode, Mnet also shared unreleased clips following the broadcast, via the official M2 YouTube channel.

Prior to the series' broadcast, Got7 live-streamed a launch show on Naver V Live where they outlined and explained their wishes for the Hard Carry series. Planned and produced by Got7 themselves, the show sees the seven members undertake a range of activities, including sports like skydiving, wakeboarding and fencing. To fit with Got7's international activities, the series was shot in various places, such as Canada, Thailand and Jeju Island. The members also self-produced music videos for several of their own songs, exclusively for the show. As of August 2018, the first season had over 87 million total views.

The five-episode second season, Hard Carry 2, aired weekly on Wednesday evenings from September 26, 2018, to October 24, 2018. The first episode earned over 83 million likes and 1.5 million views in less than 15 hours since release.

On October 23, 2019, a teaser for Hard Carry 2.5 was released; the three-episode season premiered on November 13, 2019, and ran for three weeks.

On February 3, 2020, the program won in the Entertainment Category of Vega Digital Awards with more than 100 million cumulative views.

IDOLity: Got7's TMI Lab

In late 2017, Mnet worked with Got7 again on a new three part series, IDOLity: Got7's TMI Lab, which aimed to discover more about the members through the completion of various strange tasks, for example, regarding athletic ability or tolerance towards spicy food.

Working Eat Holiday in Jeju

In February 2018, Got7 appeared in a new show, Working EAT Holiday in Jeju, which was broadcast through Naver V Live and a cable channel. The four-episode series aired on V Live from February 21, 2018, through March 21, 2018.
