= SBS Plus =

South Korean television channel

- Country: South Korea
- Broadcast area: South Korea
- Headquarters: Seoul, South Korea

Programming
- Language: Korean

Ownership
- Owner: SBS (SBS Medianet)
- Key people: Kim Kye-Hong, CEO

History
- Launched: February 21, 2002

Links
- Website: Official Homepage

SBS Plus is a 24-hour drama and entertainment television channel in South Korea.

== Outline ==
On September 1, 2000, it was approved by the Ministry of Culture, Sports and Tourism (currently the Ministry of Culture, Sports and Tourism) and started as SBS Soccer, but changed its name to SBS Drama Plus on February 1, 2002 due to financial difficulties due to overlapping areas with SBS Sports. Currently, it is providing original self-produced contents such as "Chef Friendly," "Chinese Counterpoint," "Stargram," and "Hand Flavor Talk Show Veteran" along with the latest high-quality SBS and masterpiece dramas. Meanwhile, the production division, which was SBS Productions' only deficit business, was merged in July 2009.

UHD broadcasting began on August 1, 2016, and SBS Plus UHD (now SBS F!L UHD), a channel specializing in UHD, was launched.

In addition, SBS's Wednesday-Thursday drama "Rooftop Prince," which aired from March 21 to May 24, 2012, participated in the production of the mini-series on weekdays In the last episode, it was pointed out that the streetlights, speakers, and information boards were broadcast, Compared to the popularity of thrillers, the drama caused distrust among existing and new fans with its ambiguous and difficult genre setting of "Thriller Romantic Comedy," but it has since been on the rise in ratings.

== Programs ==
- I Order You
- Girls' Love Story
- Slimmy Lunch Box
- Among Chefs
- Janghodaegyeol Joonghwadaebanjeom (강호대결 중화대반점)
- Stargram
- Sonmattokeu show Veteran
- Wednesday 3:30 PM

== See also ==
- SBS Power FM
- OnStyle
- SBS NEX
