= SBS Biz =

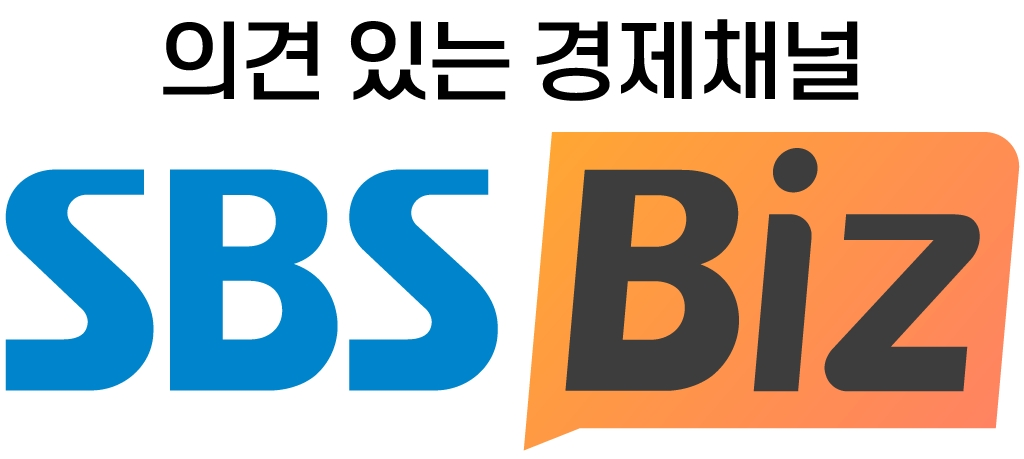
- Country: South Korea
- Broadcast area: South Korea
- Headquarters: Mapo District, Seoul

Programming
- Language: Korean

Ownership
- Owner: SBS Media Holdings (Taeyoung Group)
- Key people: Kim Kee-seong, CEO

History
- Launched: 28 December 2009
- Former names: SBS CNBC (2009–2020)

Links
- Website: biz.sbs.co.kr (in Korean)

SBS Biz (formerly SBS CNBC) is a 24-hour business news channel in South Korea.

== History ==
On August 13, 2009, SBS took over all stocks of a sports TV channel Xports, which were shared by CJ Media (70%) and IB Sports (30%). The network had the rights to MLB in 2003 and 2004. After a partnership agreement with CNBC (owned by NBCUniversal, a subsidiary of Comcast) which was taken on October 22, 2009, Xports was shut down and replaced by SBS CNBC on December 28, 2009. Most of its programme are being made in high definition. On January 1, 2021, SBS ended its partnership with CNBC and rebranded as SBS Biz.

== See also ==
- SBS
