= Seoul Broadcasting System =

South Korean television and radio network

Coordinates: 37°31′44″N 126°52′26″E

Seoul Broadcasting System (SBS)

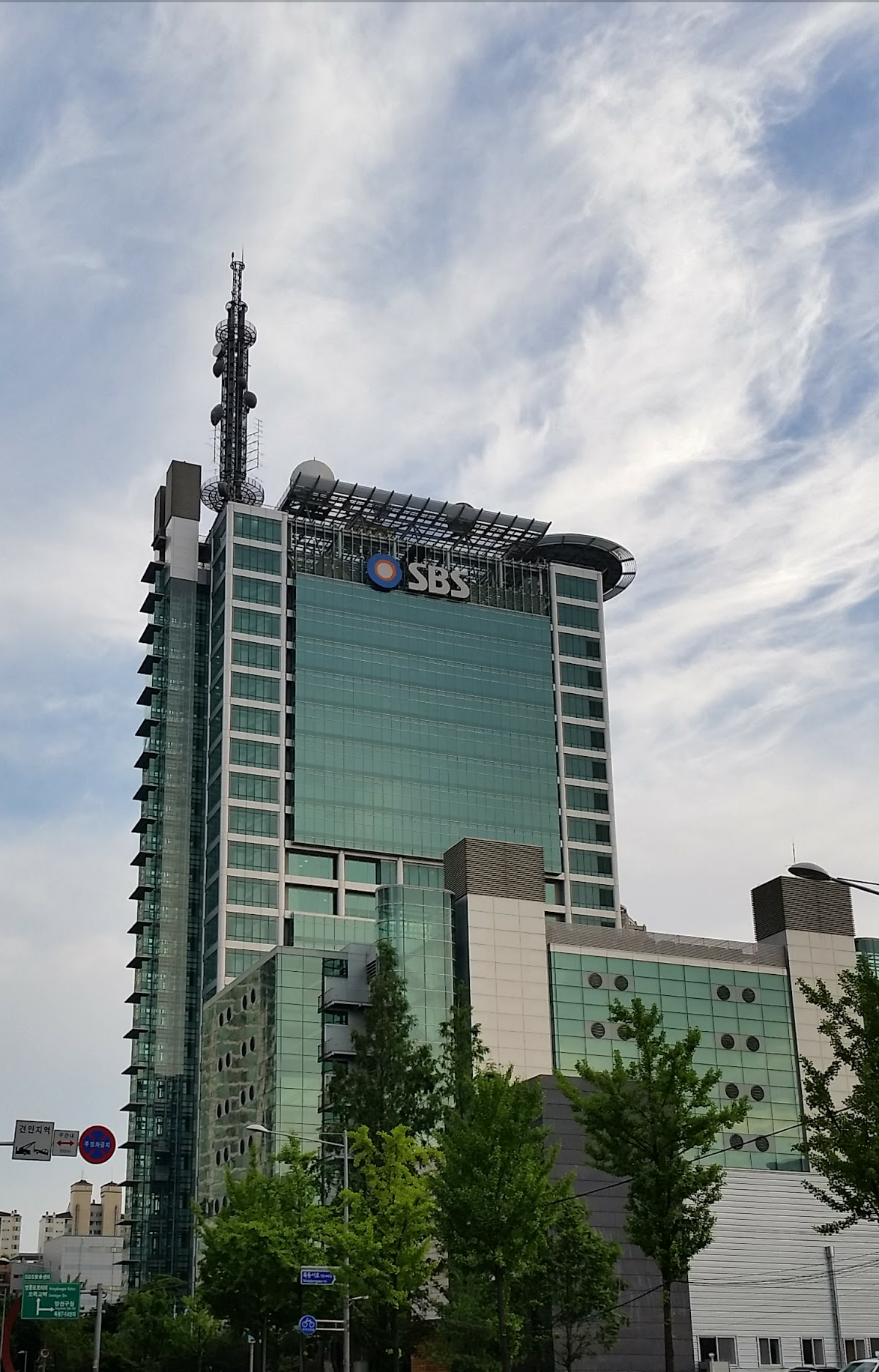
- SBS Broadcast Center in Mok-dong, Seoul, the headquarters of Seoul Broadcasting System
- Native name: 에스비에스
- Type: Public
- Traded as: KRX: 034120
- Industry: Terrestrial radio; television
- Founded: 14 November 1990; 35 years ago
- Founder: Yoon Se-youn
- Headquarters: 161, Mokdongseo-ro, Yangcheon District, Seoul, South Korea
- Area served: Worldwide, with a focus in South Korea
- Key people: Bang Moon-shin (president)
- Products: Television show
- Services: Broadcasting; Web portal
- Revenue: ₩792,884,228,900 (2015)
- Operating income: ₩42,152,487,870 (2015)
- Net income: ₩34,884,042,815 (2015)
- Total assets: ₩934,369,945,679 (2015)
- Total equity: ₩91,262,910,000 (December 2015)
- Owner: TY Holdings (36.92%); National Pension Service (13.66%)
- Number of employees: 1,141 (December 2015)
- Parent: SBS Media Holdings
- Subsidiaries: SBS A&T; Mediacreate Co., Ltd.
- Website: www.sbs.co.kr

Seoul Broadcasting System (SBS; Korean: 에스비에스) is one of the leading South Korean television and radio broadcasters. The broadcaster legally became known as SBS in March 2000, changing its corporate name from Seoul Broadcasting System (서울방송). Its flagship terrestrial television station SBS TV broadcasts as channel 6 for digital and cable.

Established on 14 November 1990, SBS is the largest private broadcaster in South Korea, and is owned by the Taeyoung Construction. It operates its flagship television channel which has a nationwide network of 10 regional stations, and three radio networks. SBS has provided digital terrestrial television service in the ATSC format since 2001, and T-DMB (Digital Multimedia Broadcasting) service since 2005.

== History ==
After South Korea's democratic reform in 1987, the government moved to create a new commercial broadcaster in South Korea, the second after the Munhwa Broadcasting Corporation (MBC). Unlike MBC, previously a part of the Korean Broadcasting System (KBS) broadcasting sporting events like the 1986 FIFA World Cup, the new commercial broadcaster was to become a broad alternative channel for the public. The Korean government announced in June 1990 that it would allow licenses to the private sector again, after ten years of hiatus. This was also seen as a counterweight to the start of NHK BS1, which was received in Korea, and was seen as controversial by pundits over trauma from the Japanese occupation in the first half of the century.

SBS was founded in Seoul on 14 November 1990, and marked its establishment with initial experimental demo broadcasts, with test transmissions for its TV and radio channels following on 1 December 1990. This move was met with some criticism, due to its connections with the Taeyoung construction corporation, who owned 30% of the shares. The Hankook Ilbo even called the affair "the scandal of the Sixth Republic". On 20 March 1991, SBS started its regular broadcasts, launching SBS Radio's first regular broadcast on AM 792kHz. On 1 December 1991, the 30th anniversary of MBC, SBS commenced its official broadcasts with the introduction of SBS TV at 10:00am in Seoul, designated as "The Day of Birth of SBS", as broadcast by MBC on the program MBC Newsdesk.

Initially, SBS was only broadcast terrestrially in Seoul and its surrounding areas. On 9 October 1992, the government began accepting applications for private broadcasting stations in other regions of the country. SBS planned for a television and radio broadcast affiliate network to air SBS programs on other new regional channels before its 5th anniversary. In 1994, the private Korea New Network (KNN) in Busan, Taejon Broadcasting Corporation (TJB) in Daejeon, Daegu Broadcasting Corporation (TBC) in Daegu, and Kwangju Broadcasting Corporation (KBC) in Gwangju were created, after government approval. On 14 May 1995, SBS launched its national television network with new local affiliates, KNN, TJB, TBC, and KBC, airing SBS programming on the regional channels while local stations created local programming to suit the local residents needs.

In 1996, an FM radio station was established to complement the existing AM station. In February, the five SBS stations formed an association. On 14 November 1996, SBS Power FM began broadcasting on 107.7 MHz as a music-centric station. On 4 January 1999, the original SBS Radio on AM 792 kHz began broadcasting on FM as well. The station rebranded as SBS Love FM on 103.5 MHz, broadcasting simultaneously on AM and FM frequencies. High-definition digital television was introduced in 2001. Digital Multimedia Broadcasting (DMB) was introduced in 2005.

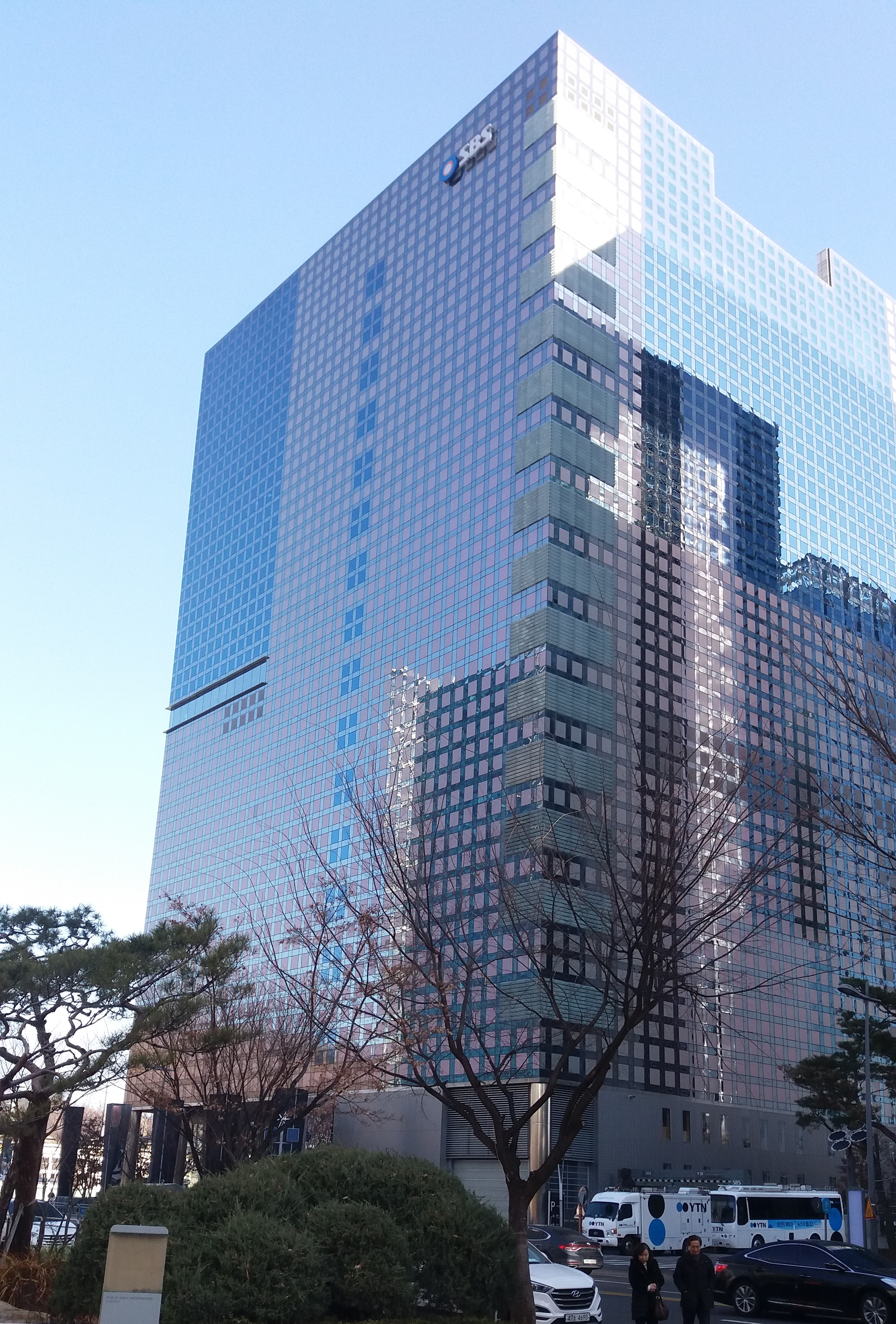
SBS Prism Tower, the television broadcasting headquarters building of SBS

SBS introduced its current logo on 14 November 2000, after its 10th anniversary celebration entitled "SBS 10th Anniversary Special: Thank You, Viewers". SBS also used the slogan "Humanism thru Digital" until January 2010, when a new slogan was introduced: "Together, we make delight". On 29 October 2012, SBS TV became South Korea's second channel to broadcast 24 hours a day. However, this was discontinued in 2017, and the channel has reverted to daily sign-off routines overnight.

== CEOs ==
Term	Name	Period
1st	Yoon Se-young	14 November 1990 to 8 March 1994
2nd	Yoon Hyuk-ki	9 March 1994 to 8 March 1999
3rd	Song Do-kyun	9 March 1999 to 7 April 2005
4th	Ahn Guk-jeong	8 April 2005 to 11 March 2007
5th	Ha Geum-yeol	12 March 2007 to 31 December 2009
6th	Woo Won-gil	1 January 2010 to 1 December 2013
7th	Lee Ung-mo	2 December 2013 to 3 December 2015
8th	Kim Jin-won	4 December 2015 to 7 December 2016
9th	Park Jeong-hoon	8 December 2016 to 30 November 2023
11th	Bang Moon-shin	1 December 2023 to present

== SBS channels ==
- 1 terrestrial TV (SBS TV Channel 6)
- 3 radio stations

Name	Frequency	Power (kW)	Transmitter Site
SBS Love FM	103.5 MHz FM; 98.3 MHz FM	10 kW (FM)	Mount Gwanaksan, Seoul (FM); Icheon City, Gyeonggi Province (FM)
SBS Power FM	107.7 MHz FM; 100.3 MHz FM	10 kW; 100W	Mount Gwanaksan, Seoul; Saengyeon-dong, Dongducheon City, Gyeonggi Province
SBS V-Radio	CH 12C DMB	2 kW	Mount Gwanaksan, Seoul

- 8 cable TV channels (SBS Plus, SBS Golf, SBS Golf 2, SBS funE, SBS Life, SBS Sports, SBS Biz and SBS NEX)

== Holding and subsidiaries ==
SBS Media Holdings, Ltd.
- Native name: (주)에스비에스미디어홀딩스
- Type: Public
- Traded as: KRX: 101060 (2008.3.24)
- Industry: Broadcasting; Communication
- Founded: Seoul, South Korea (4 March 2008)
- Headquarters: 161, Mokdongseo-ro, Yangcheon District, Seoul, South Korea
- Services: Broadcasting holding company
- Revenue: 473,523,143,447 won (2015)
- Operating income: 23,260,805,348 won (2015)
- Net income: 25,227,364,840 won (2015)
- Total assets: 881,606,449,180 won (December 2015)
- Total equity: 69,948,095,000 won (December 2015)
- Owner: Taeyoung Engineering & Construction Co., Ltd: 61.42% Kiturami Boiler Co., Ltd: 8.78% National Pension Service: 6.98%
- Parent: Taeyoung E&C (KRX: 009410)
- Subsidiaries: SBS; SBS Contents Hub; SBS Medianet
- Website: www.sbsmedia.co.kr

=== Family companies ===
Name	Description
SBS Media Holdings	Parent company of SBS
SBS International, Inc.	Operates SBS America, mainly from Los Angeles.
SBS Academy	Trains and manages employees
SBS Artech	Provides creative support
SBS Newstech	Provides information technology
SBS Contents Hub	Distributes media online
SBS Culture Foundation	Provides support for broadcast and cultural innovation
Seoam Foundation	Provide scholarships
SBS Medianet	Operates the cable channels of SBS F!L, SBS Biz, SBS Sports, SBS Golf and SBS Golf 2
Medianet Plus	Operates the cable channels of SBS Plus and SBS funE
Studio S	Provides in-house drama production
Binge Works	Production company
Vlending Co., Ltd. (SBS and MBC)	Provides music distribution
Prism Studios	Provides in-house entertainment and non-scripted production

== SBS Regional ==
Channel	Corporate name	Broadcast regions	Date of founding	Date of launch
SBS	Seoul Broadcasting System	Seoul, Incheon and Gyeonggi	14 November 1990	1 December 1991
KNN	Korea New Network	Busan and South Gyeongsang	April 1994	14 May 1995
TJB	Taejon Broadcasting Corporation	Daejeon, Sejong and South Chungcheong	9 April 1994	14 May 1995
TBC	Taegu Broadcasting Corporation	Daegu and North Gyeongsang	10 August 1994	14 May 1995
kbc	Kwangju Broadcasting Corporation	Gwangju and South Jeolla	10 August 1994	14 May 1995
CJB	Cheongju Broadcasting	North Chungcheong	5 July 1996	18 October 1997
ubc	Ulsan Broadcasting Corporation	Ulsan	4 September 1996	1 September 1997
JTV	Jeonju Television	North Jeolla	25 January 1997	27 September 1997
G1	Gangwon No.1 Broadcasting	Gangwon	16 November 1999	15 December 2001
JIBS	Jeju International Broadcasting System	Jeju Island	7 December 2001	31 May 2002

== Programming ==
SBS dramas have been part of the "Korean wave", exported to many countries across the world. Sandglass has one of the highest viewership ratings in South Korea, and is considered the breakout drama for the network. Other dramas that have enjoyed high viewership include Lovers in Paris, Trap of Youth, Brilliant Legacy, Rustic Period, Temptation of Wife, The Heirs, and My Love from the Star. SBS airs a variety of entertainment programs ranging from informational, comedy, music, reality, talk shows, and auditions. Many programs are popular throughout Asia, including X-Man, Family Outing, Running Man, Inkigayo, and many more. SBS documentaries encompass a wide range of issues, from foreign affairs to the environment. Unanswered Questions (Korean:그것이 알고싶다/literal translation: I Want to know) premiered in 1992, and has since earned notoriety for its investigations from a journalistic standpoint. SBS also broke tradition by creating its flagship newscast SBS Eight O'Clock News, airing at 20:00 instead of 21:00, giving itself the slogan "News an hour earlier". It also produces news-analysis programs such as Morning Wide, Nightline, SBS Current Affairs Debate, Curious Stories Y, and In Depth 21 covering the political, economic, social and cultural issues of the days.

== Mascot ==
The network's mascot is Komi (고미), an abstract blue bear, created in 2004. The mascot conveys SBS's ideologies. In 2012 he was redesigned taking into account the growing digital media environment. In conjunction with the redesign, friends were added, Gorilla (고릴라), who is interested in music, Looly (룰리), a tall green bear who helps Komi, Poly (폴리), a problem-solving know-it-all purple penguin and Tory (토리), a pink rabbit with a youthful personality.

== See also ==
- Korean Broadcasting System
- Educational Broadcasting System
- Munhwa Broadcasting Corporation
