= CJ ENM Entertainment Division =

South Korean entertainment and mass media company

- The CJ ENM Center in Seoul
- Native name: 씨제이이엔엠 엔터테인먼트 부문
- Formerly: O Media Holdings (2010–2011); CJ E&M (2011–2018)
- Type: Division
- Traded as: KRX: 130960 (15 October 2010 to 1 July 2018)
- Industry: Entertainment; Mass media; Production
- Predecessor: CJ O Shopping media division; CJ Media; On-Media; Mnet Media; CJ Entertainment; CJ Games; CJ Internet
- Founded: October 15, 2010; 16 years ago (as O Media Holdings)
- Founder: CJ Group
- Successor: CJ ENM (as a standalone public company)
- Headquarters: CJ ENM Center (Sangamsanro 66, Mapo-gu, Seoul); CJ ENM Ilsan Studio (Daehwaro 369, Ilsanseo-gu, Goyang-si, Gyeonggi), South Korea
- Area served: Worldwide
- Key people: NICO (CEO)
- Parent: CJ Group (2011–2018); CJ ENM (2018–present)
- Website: www.cjenm.com/ko/ (Note: Formerly www.cjenm.com until July 1, 2018; the former domain is now under CJ ENM.)

CJ ENM Entertainment Division (Korean: 씨제이이엔엠 엔터테인먼트 부문), formerly known as CJ E&M, is a South Korean entertainment and mass media division (formerly company) of CJ ENM. In July 2018, the company merged with the parent company's subsidiary CJ O Shopping, with the latter being the surviving entity.

== History ==
CJ E&M was established as O Media Holdings in 2010.

In 2011, the company renamed to CJ E&M (short for CJ Entertainment & Media) following the merger of seven CJ Group company : CJ Media, On-Media, Mnet Media, CJ Entertainment, CJ Games, CJ Internet, and the media division of CJ O Shopping.

In 2016, CJ E&M sets up its South East Asia headquarter in Hong Kong in a bid to expand the group's major development plan in Asia.

In 2018, CJ E&M established an office in Singapore to advance the company's channel distribution and advertising sales support in the region. In May 2018, it was announced that CJ E&M and CJ O Shopping merged into new company CJ ENM (CJ Entertainment and Merchandising), which will be launched on July 1.

== Business ==
=== Present ===
Media Content – operating as a media company and television program production.

- OCN family of networks
  - OCN
  - OCN Movies (formerly Home CGV and Channel CGV)
  - OCN Movies 2 (formerly OCN Action, Super Action and OCN Thrills)
  - OCN Studio (content division)
- Mnet
  - M2
    - Studio Choom
- tvN
- CATCH ON
- Chunghwa TV
- Tooniverse
- Channel Wide
- UXN
- Studio Dragon
  - Culture Depot
  - GT:st
  - Gill Pictures
  - Hwa&Dam Pictures
  - KPJ Corporation
  - Studio Dragon Japan (Japan; co-owned with Line Digital Frontier and CJ ENM)
  - Mega Monster (5.86%)*
  - Merrycow Creative (19%)*
  - Next Scene (19.98%)*
- CJ ENM Studios
  - Blaad Studio
  - Bon Factory Worldwide
  - Egg Is Coming
- JS Pictures
- AStory (10.71%)*
- Studio Take One
- Fifth Season (co-owned with Endeavor and Toho International)
- CJ ENM Digital Studio
  - The Bob Studio
  - Sapiens Studio
  - Studio Waffle

Film – operating as a film production company, film publishing house, film investment production.

- CJ Entertainment
  - Cinema Service
  - Dexter Studios (5%)*
  - Filament Pictures
- Skydance (unknown percentage; based in the United States)*
- CJ ENM Studios
  - JK Film
  - M Makers
  - Moho Film
  - Yong Film Inc.
- 413 Pictures
  - Movie Rock (20%)*.

Music – operating as an artists management, record label, music production company, event management, concert production company, music publishing house and entertainment investment company.

- Management
  - Wake One
  - AOMG
  - H1ghr Music
  - Amoeba Culture
  - MODHAUS
  - Lapone Entertainment (based in Japan, co-managed by Yoshimoto Kogyo)
- Distribution
  - Stone Music Entertainment
  - Genie Music (15.35%)*

Convention – operating as a concert production company, festival production and producing award event.

- MAMA Awards
- KCON
- Valley Rock Music & Arts Festival
- Get It Beauty CON
- OLive CON

Performing Arts – operating as a theatrical production company.

Animation – operating as an animation production company, animation publishing house, animation investment production and merchandising animation content.

- InfinityOne Comics Entertainment
- Studio Bazooka
- CJ ENM Studios
  - Cartoon Family

Media Solution – developing and producing marketing content and providing integrated marketing solutions.

=== Former ===
- Belift Lab (51.5%) – a joint venture with Hybe Corporation – later sold its shares to Hybe in August 2023.
- CJ E&M Game Division – publisher and developer of games – spun off in 2014 as an independent company named CJ Netmarble (Korean: 씨제이넷마블; RR: CJ Netmabul, later renamed as Netmarble*).
- Eccho Rights – based in Sweden – later bought by Night Train Media.

* denotes a company wherein CJ ENM or any of its subsidiaries has a minority interest.

== Controversies ==
In April 2015, CJ E&M was accused of mobilizing young employees to fill the seats of its annual general meeting (AGM) of shareholders in an attempt to silence shareholders.

In October 2015, CJ E&M and its US-based subsidiary CJ E&M America were sued by Seoul-based music agency DFSB Kollective for copyright infringement and violation of the Digital Millennium Copyright Act in the Central District Court of California, with the latter seeking to get $50 million. Responding to the suit, CJ E&M accused DFSB of being unhappy on the final decision on a similar lawsuit filed in Seoul in 2011. The first trial was set for 1 March 2016 after the court rejected CJ E&M's motion to dismiss the case.

== See also ==
- CJ Group
