= SBS funE =

SBS FunE
- Country: South Korea
- Broadcast area: South Korea
- Headquarters: Seoul, South Korea

Programming
- Language: Korean

Ownership
- Owner: SBS (SBS Medianet)

History
- Launched: August 16, 2005
- Former names: UTV (2005-December 31, 2008); E! (January 1, 2009-October 31, 2011); SBS E! (November 1, 2011-December 31, 2013)

Links
- Website: fune.sbs.co.kr

SBS FunE (stylised SBS funE, formerly UTV, E! and SBS E!) is a South Korean cable and satellite television channel owned by SBS.

Launched as UTV on August 16, 2005, it became E! on January 1, 2009 after an agreement between SBS and Comcast on September 5, 2008. Using the E! brand under license from Comcast, its programming consisted mostly of those from E! U.S., but also carried programs from the South Korean counterpart, as well as the libraries of SBS. Number of programs from E! have been dropped since then.

The channel officially renamed to SBS E! on November 1, 2011, retaining only the red E! logo. The channel became SBS funE on January 1, 2014, completely dropping the Comcast-owned brand.

== Logo ==
2009-2011

2018-2021

2022-present
