= Chunghwa TV =

South Korean Chinese television channel

Chinese name
- Traditional Chinese: 中華 TV
- Simplified Chinese: 中华 TV
Transcriptions
Standard Mandarin
- Hanyu Pinyin: Zhōnghuá TV

Korean name
- Hangul: 중화 TV
- Hanja: 中華 TV
Transcriptions
- Revised Romanization: Junghwa TV
- McCune–Reischauer: Chunghwa TV

Chunghwa TV, owned by CJ ENM Entertainment Division, is a Chinese television channel with Korean subtitles, also catering to the ethnic Chinese population. It broadcasts various programs such as Chinese lessons, music videos, news, dramas, etc. The company headquarters is located in Seoul, South Korea.

== See also ==
- TVB Korea Channel
