= CJ ENM =

South Korean entertainment and retail company

CJ ENM Co., Ltd 주식회사 씨제이이엔엠
- Native name: 씨제이이엔엠
- Type: Subsidiary
- Traded as: KRX: 035760 (Note: the former ticker symbol of the company's home shopping division.)
- Industry: Entertainment; Mass Media; Retail
- Predecessor: CJ E&M; CJ O Shopping
- Founded: January 22, 1978; 48 years ago (as CJ O Shopping)
- Headquarters: see list
- Area served: Worldwide
- Key people: Kang Ho-sung (CEO); Heo Min-ho (CEO); Choi Jin-hee (EVP)
- Revenue: ▲KRW 5.485 trillion (2025)
- Operating income: ▲KRW 130.0 billion (2025)
- Net income: ▲KRW 5.0 billion (2025)
- Total assets: ▼KRW 8.52 trillion (2025)
- Total equity: ▼KRW 3.65 trillion (2025)
- Parent: CJ Group
- Divisions: Entertainment division; Commerce division
- Website: www.cjenm.com/ko/

CJ ENM Co., Ltd (Korean: 씨제이이엔엠, CJ Entertainment aNd Merchandising) is a South Korean entertainment and retail company founded in 1994.

CJ ENM was established as a result of the merger of two CJ Group subsidiaries, CJ E&M and CJ O Shopping respectively, on July 1, 2018.

In 2020, the company established a first look deal with Warner Horizon.

In early December 2021, CJ ENM has partnered with ViacomCBS (now Skydance Corporation) for bringing Paramount+ into TVING along with co-production in future projects.

In January 2022, CJ ENM bought a majority stake of Endeavor Content and changed the name to Fifth Season in September 2022. In December 2023, Japanese film company Toho, through its subsidiary Toho International, announced its intent to acquire 25% of Fifth Season for $225 million.

Amazon Prime Video has renewed the partnership with CJ ENM to being more Korean contents to Indian markets, further enhanced the availability for K-dramas and K-variety across India.

== Divisions ==
- CJ ENM Entertainment Division operates as an entertainment and media company.
- CJ ENM Commerce Division operates as a home shopping company.

== Assets ==
Assets owned by CJ ENM include:

Region/Country	Units
South Korea	CJ ENM Entertainment Division; OCN family of networks; OCN; OCN Movies (formerly Home CGV and Channel CGV); OCN Movies 2 (formerly OCN Action, Super Action and OCN Thrills); OCN Studio (content division); Mnet; M2; Studio Choom; tvN; CATCH ON; Tooniverse; Channel Wide; UXN; Studio Dragon; Culture Depot; GT:st; GTist; Hwa&Dam Pictures; KPJ Corporation; Studio Dragon Japan; Mega Monster (5.86%); Merrycow Creative (19%); Next Scene (19.98%); CJ ENM Studios; Blaad Studio; Bon Factory Worldwide; Egg Is Coming; JK Film; M Makers; Moho Film; Yong Film Inc.; 413 Pictures; Movie Rock (20%); JS Pictures; AStory; Studio Take One
United States	Fifth Season; Skydance (minority stake)
China	Chunghwa TV
International	CJ ENM Digital Studio; The Bob Studio; Sapiens Studio; Studio Waffle; CJ Entertainment; Filament Pictures; Cinema Service; Dexter Studios (5%)
Former/Defunct	Belift Lab (South Korea) previously joint venture; CJ E&M Game Division; Eccho Rights (Sweden)

== Locations ==
- CJ ENM Entertainment Division: 66, Sangamsan-Ro, Mapo-Gu, Seoul, Korea
- CJ ENM Commerce Division: 870–13, 870–13, Gwacheon-daero, Seocho-gu, Seoul, Korea
