= Joo Jin-mo =

Joo Jin-mo (Korean: 주진모) may refer to:

- Joo Jin-mo (actor, born 1958), South Korean actor
- Joo Jin-mo (actor, born 1974), South Korean actor
