= Uhm Tae-woong =

South Korean actor

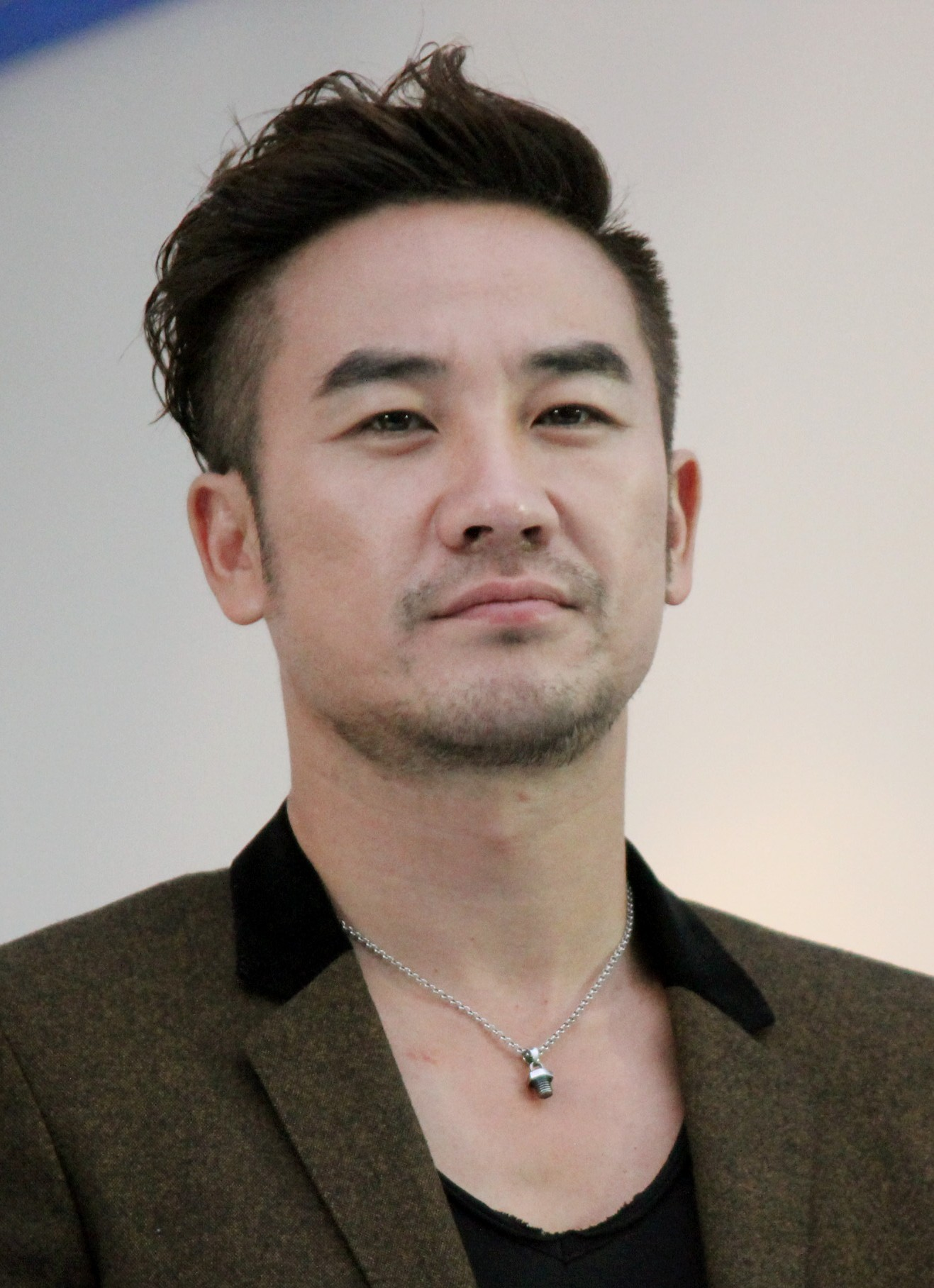
- Uhm in October 2013
- Born: April 5, 1974 (age 52); Jecheon, North Chungcheong Province, South Korea
- Education: Kookmin University; Konkuk University
- Occupation: Actor
- Years active: 1998–present
- Agent: Studio Santa Claus Entertainment
- Spouse: Yoon Hye-jin (m. 2013)
- Children: 1
- Family: Uhm Jung-hwa (sister)

Korean name
- Hangul: 엄태웅
- Hanja: 嚴泰雄
- RR: Eom Taeung
- MR: Ŏm T'aeung

Uhm Tae-woong (born April 5, 1974) is a South Korean actor. He made his acting debut in 1998, but initially struggled to emerge from under the shadow of his older sister, popular singer-actress Uhm Jung-hwa. After several years of small roles and work in one-act dramas, Uhm began to gain recognition after his villainous turn in the romantic comedy Sassy Girl Chun-hyang. In 2005, he made his breakthrough in the critically acclaimed Resurrection, followed by another revenge-themed series Lucifer in 2007. Since then, he has starred in diverse leading roles on film and television, notably in Forever the Moment (2008), Chaw (2009), Cyrano Agency (2010), Architecture 101 (2012), and Man from the Equator (2012).

== Career ==
=== 1998–2004: Struggling actor ===
Uhm Tae-woong was unsure which college course to take, so he initially joined Kyungmin College's theater department because his crush was there. But even after the girl shifted majors, Uhm stayed after having befriended a fellow student who would become his current manager, and began acting in earnest.

Uhm made his acting debut in 1998 at the age of 24, and began playing bit parts and supporting roles in films, television dramas and music videos. Among these was the 2003 blockbuster Silmido, in which he played a member of a suicide commando unit trained to kill Kim Il-sung in the 1960s. Starring veteran actors Sul Kyung-gu and Ahn Sung-ki, Silmido drew over 10 million admissions, and Ahn encouraged Uhm, saying he "would turn into a true actor." Uhm continued to go on auditions with little success, partly from the long shadow cast by his older sister, popular singer-actress Uhm Jung-hwa.

Then in 2004, Uhm played a dying man in the acclaimed Drama City episode Blue Skies of Jeju Island, a well-received performance for which he won his first acting trophy at the 2004 KBS Drama Awards.

=== 2005: Breakthrough ===
Uhm began his rise to popularity with the 2005 romantic comedy series Sassy Girl Chun-hyang, a modern retelling of the classic Korean folktale Chunhyangjeon. But instead of the villainous magistrate of the folktale, Uhm played a talent agency executive who becomes obsessed with the heroine.

But it was Resurrection later that year that cemented his stardom. He had originally been cast as the antagonist, but after lead actor Park Yong-woo dropped out three weeks before filming due to scheduling conflicts, director Park Chan-hong took a risk and cast Uhm as the protagonist. Playing dual roles as two very different identical twins, one of whom embarks on a quest for revenge, it was Uhm's first leading role in a TV series. Despite low ratings, Resurrection was a critical hit and gained a cult following, and one review praised Uhm for "the kind of acting expected from Song Kang-ho and Choi Min-sik," not from a young little-known actor who'd previously appeared in a few projects in supporting roles. His growing fanbase nicknamed him "the UhmForce" (derived from Star Wars), and he received an Excellence Award from the 2005 KBS Drama Awards and a Best TV Actor nomination from the 2006 Baeksang Arts Awards.

=== 2006–2008: Leading roles continue ===
In 2006, he and Resurrection leading lady Han Ji-min were cast in Wolf, but an on-set accident that injured Han and co-star Eric Mun led to production being halted and the series was cancelled after airing only three episodes. Uhm moved on to Stranger Than Paradise, in which he played the manager of a singer, the same woman his long-lost brother also falls in love with. He also joined the ensemble cast of Kim Tae-yong's critically acclaimed film Family Ties, playing a reckless but charming man who suddenly shows up at his sister's door with a live-in partner 20 years his senior. For this role, Uhm won Best New Actor at the Chunsa Film Art Awards.

In 2007, Uhm, reunited with Resurrection's director Park Chan-hong and writer Kim Ji-woo in Lucifer, the second in Park and Kim's noir vengeance trilogy that explore the conflict between good and evil, and sin and punishment. He gave another memorable lead performance as a detective hunting down a serial killer while attempting to atone for his past. Uhm also starred in December romance My Love, in which his character is a Free Hugs activist who returns to Korea after six years overseas in the hopes of finding his ex-girlfriend.

Finally no longer known as simply "Uhm Jung-hwa's kid brother," he continued building a diverse filmography in 2008. In Yim Soon-rye's sleeper hit Forever the Moment, Uhm played the tough coach of the National Women's Handball Team (and received a Best Supporting Actor nomination from the Blue Dragon Film Awards). In Lee Joon-ik's Sunny, he played a newly married Korean soldier conscripted during the Vietnam War. And in Iri, he played a cab driver taking care of his mentally impaired sister in the aftermath of the Iri Station Explosion.

=== 2009–2010: Ratings and box-office success ===
In 2009, Uhm played a celebrity manager who is threatened by an unknown man and driven to the extremes in Handphone. This was followed by the black comedy Chaw, in which his character is a policeman battling with a mutant boar. Uhm then starred as 7th-century Silla general Kim Yushin in the popular period drama Queen Seondeok, for which he received a Top Excellence Award at the 2009 MBC Drama Awards.

Romantic comedy Cyrano Agency was the 8th most commercially successful Korean film of 2010, and in it, Uhm played a theater actor-turned-dating coach whose ex-girlfriend is being pursued by his client. While in Dr. Champ, after his character's ice hockey career was ended by injury, he became a cranky sports medicine doctor reminiscent of Gregory House.

=== 2011–2013: Reality show ===
In 2011, Uhm joined the cast of 2 Days & 1 Night, a popular variety-reality show which travels throughout Korea, featuring small towns and their inhabitants. Through it, viewers discovered the real-life shy, dorky personality behind Uhm's intense screen persona.

Meanwhile, he continued with his acting projects. He acted opposite 2 Days & 1 Night co-star Joo Won in S.I.U., as two detectives who team up against corruption in their ranks.

In 2012, Uhm played one half of a quirky terminally ill couple in Never Ending Story, and an architect building his first love's house in Architecture 101 (the latter was a box-office hit, breaking records at the time as the top-grossing Korean melodrama of all time).

He returned to television in another revenge-themed drama, Man from the Equator. Uhm drew praise for his performance as a blind man, and received an Excellence Award from the 2012 KBS Drama Awards, as well as a Best TV Actor nomination from the 2013 Baeksang Arts Awards.

In 2013, he made a guest appearance in Joo Won's spy comedy series 7th Grade Civil Servant. Uhm then reunited with Man from the Equator director Kim Yong-soo in The Blade and Petal, a period drama set in Goguryeo. He played Yeon Gaesomun's fictional illegitimate son who has a forbidden romance with the princess whose father, the king, was killed by Yeon in a coup.

Veteran actor Park Joong-hoon then cast Uhm in the lead role in Park's directorial debut Top Star. He played a manager who dreams of becoming an actor.

Later that year, Uhm left 2 Days & 1 Night along with other regulars Lee Soo-geun, Sung Si-kyung, and Yoo Hae-jin.

=== 2014: Cable dramas ===
In early 2014, Uhm played an arrogant film director who falls in love with a divorcee in Can We Fall in Love, Again?, which aired on cable channel jTBC.

This was followed later in the year by Righteous Love from tvN, in which his character's marriage is put to the test after his wife has an affair, so as a marine researcher he sets out to prove that her new romance is "invalid."

=== 2015: Back to variety ===
In January 2015, Uhm and his daughter Ji-on began appearing in The Return of Superman, a reality show in which male celebrities take care of their young children for 48 hours. He left the program in October 2015.

== Personal life ==
Uhm's father, Uhm Jin-ok, was a public school music teacher who died in a motorcycle accident before Uhm turned 100 days old. After his father's death, the family (consisting of his mother, Yoo Gyeong-sook, three older sisters, and him as the youngest) faced serious financial problems. His older sister Uhm Jung-hwa entered show business as a pop singer and released her first album in 1993 (earning the label "Madonna of Korea"); she later turned to acting.

On the November 4, 2012 episode of 2 Days & 1 Night, Uhm made the surprise announcement that he was engaged to ballerina Yoon Hye-jin, and that they were expecting their first child. The daughter of veteran actor Yoon Il-bong and niece of veteran actor Yoo Dong-geun, Yoon was a principal dancer with the Korea National Ballet before she moved to the Les Ballets de Monte Carlo. They were introduced by Uhm's older sister Uhm Jung-hwa. The couple wed on January 9, 2013 at Conrad Hotel Seoul. 2 Days & 1 Night co-star Sung Si-kyung and singer You Hee-yeol sang on their wedding. Their daughter, Uhm Ji-on, was born on June 18, 2013.

== Filmography ==
=== Film ===
Year	Title	Role
1998	The Happenings	Employee
2003	Spring Bears Love	Lee Young-seok
2003	Silmido	Won-sang
2004	A Family	Dong-su
2005	Another Public Enemy	Song Jung-hoon
2006	Family Ties	Lee Hyung-chul
2007	My Love	Jin-man
2008	Forever the Moment	Ahn Seung-pil
2008	Sunny	Sang-gil
2008	Iri	Tae-woong
2009	Handphone	Oh Seung-min
2009	Chaw	Police officer Kim
2010	Cyrano Agency	Lee Byeong-hoon
2011	S.I.U.	Kim Seong-beom
2012	Never Ending Story	Kang Dong-joo
2012	Architecture 101	Lee Seung-min
2013	Top Star	Tae-sik
2017	Fork Lane	Kim Gang-il
2025	Final Homework	

=== Television series ===
Year	Title	Role
2000	Look Back in Anger	
2001	High School	
2001	MBC Best Theater: "An Incomplete Love"	
2004	Span Drama: "10 Years Later"	
2004	MBC Best Theater: "Train for Gomsk"	Husband
2004	Forbidden Love	Sa-joon
2004	Drama City: "Blue Skies of Jeju Island"	Kim Ki-tae
2005	Sassy Girl Chun-hyang	Byun Hak-do
2005	Resurrection	Seo Ha-eun/Yoo Shin-hyuk
2006	Wolf	Yoon Sung-mo
2006	Stranger Than Paradise	Kang San-ho
2007	Lucifer	Kang Oh-soo
2008	Fight	Kang Gun's father (cameo)
2009	Queen Seondeok	Kim Yu-sin
2010	Dr. Champ	Lee Do-wook
2012	Man from the Equator	Kim Sun-woo
2013	7th Grade Civil Servant	Choi Woo-hyuk (guest, episodes 1-4)
2013	The Blade and Petal	Yeon Choong
2014	Can We Fall in Love, Again?	Oh Kyung-soo
2014	Righteous Love	Jang Hee-tae
2016	Wanted	PD Shin Dong-wook
2025	I Kill You	

=== Variety show ===
Year	Title	Notes
2002	New Year's Special: Pokso Song Festival	
	Family Sings on Saturday	
2011–2013	2 Days & 1 Night	Cast member
2015	The Return of Superman	Cast member

=== Music video appearances ===
Year	Song title	Artist
1998	"Miracle"	Kim Dong-ryool
2001	"Tears"	Hwayobi
2003	"I Am Always Alone"	Page
2004	"Timeless"	SG Wannabe
2004	"I Loved You to Death"	SG Wannabe
2005	"Ordinary Woman"	Lyn

== Theater ==
Year	Title	Role
	The Caucasian Chalk Circle	
	Jesus Christ Superstar	

== Discography ==
Year	Song title	From Album	Notes
2007	"Please Don't Love Me"	Track from Lucifer OST	
2009	"The Only One"	Track from Queen Seondeok Special OST	
2009	"Impression"	Track from Queen Seondeok Special OST	
2010	"I Went to Cheonggyesan Mt."	Track from Cyrano Agency OST	Duet with Choi Daniel
2011	"Confession Day"	Track from Never Ending Story OST	
2011	"Wedding Song"	Track from Never Ending Story OST	Duet with Jung Ryeo-won
2012	"One Fine Day in October"	Track from Man from the Equator OST	Duet with Lee Bo-young
2012	"해당화 외 (한용운 작)"	Track from Man from the Equator OST	

== Awards and nominations ==
Year	Award	Category	Nominated work	Result
2004	KBS Drama Awards	Best Actor in a One-Act Drama/Special	Blue Skies of Jeju Island	Won
2005	KBS Drama Awards	Excellence Award, Actor	Resurrection, Sassy Girl Chun-hyang	Won
2005	KBS Drama Awards	Best Couple Award with Han Ji-min	Resurrection	Won
2006	42nd Baeksang Arts Awards	Best Actor (TV)	Resurrection	Nominated
2006	14th Chunsa Film Art Awards	Best New Actor	Family Ties	Won
2007	KBS Drama Awards	Excellence Award, Actor in a Miniseries	Lucifer	Nominated
2008	29th Blue Dragon Film Awards	Best Supporting Actor	Forever the Moment	Nominated
2009	MBC Drama Awards	Top Excellence Award, Actor	Queen Seondeok	Won
2010	SBS Drama Awards	Top Excellence Award, Actor in a Special Planning Drama	Dr. Champ	Nominated
2011	KBS Entertainment Awards	Grand Prize (Daesang) shared with entire cast	2 Days & 1 Night	Won
2011	KBS Entertainment Awards	Top Entertainer Award	2 Days & 1 Night	Won
2012	5th Korea Drama Awards	Grand Prize (Daesang)	Man from the Equator	Nominated
2012	1st K-Drama Star Awards	Excellence Award, Actor	Man from the Equator	Nominated
2012	KBS Drama Awards	Top Excellence Award, Actor	Man from the Equator	Nominated
2012	KBS Drama Awards	Excellence Award, Actor in a Mid-length Drama	Man from the Equator	Won
2012	KBS Drama Awards	PD Award	Man from the Equator	Won
2013	49th Baeksang Arts Awards	Best Actor (TV)	Man from the Equator	Nominated
2013	KBS Drama Awards	Top Excellence Award, Actor	The Blade and Petal	Nominated
2013	KBS Drama Awards	Excellence Award, Actor in a Mid-length Drama	The Blade and Petal	Nominated
2013	47th Taxpayer's Day	Presidential Commendation	—N/a	Won
