= Oh Jae-moo =

South Korean actor

- Born: November 11, 1998 (age 27); Busan, South Korea
- Occupation: Actor
- Years active: 2010–2013; 2017–present
- Agent: Grand Anse Entertainment

Korean name
- Hangul: 오재무
- RR: O Jaemu
- MR: O Chaemu

Oh Jae-moo (born November 11, 1998) is a South Korean actor.

== Filmography ==
=== Television series ===
Year	Title	Role
2010	Bread, Love and Dreams	young Kim Tak-gu
2011	My Love, My Family	Kwon Doo-hyun
2011	Six-fingered Boy	
2011	Bachelor's Vegetable Store	young Han Tae-yang
2012	Full House Take 2	teenage Lee Tae-ik
2012	Faith	Yi Seong-gye
2012	Cheer Up, Mr. Kim!	Go Joo-sung
2013	The Eldest	young Lee In-ho
2013	Golden Rainbow	young Seo Do-young
2017	My Father Is Strange	young Byun Joon-young

=== Film ===
Year	Title	Role
2011	Pitch High	Yoon Dong-chul
2012	A Company Man	young Ji Hyeong-do
2013	Red Family	Chang-soo
2019	Thug Teacher	Jung Nam-hoon

== Awards and nominations ==
Year	Award	Category	Nominated work	Result
2010	Korean Culture and Entertainment Awards	Best Child Actor	Bread, Love and Dreams	Won
2010	KBS Drama Awards	Best Young Actor	Bread, Love and Dreams	Won
2011	KBS Drama Awards	Best Young Actor	My Love, My Family	Nominated
2012	KBS Drama Awards	Best Young Actor	Cheer Up, Mr. Kim!	Nominated
