= Children (2011 film) =

Children...
- Film poster
- Directed by: Lee Gyu-man
- Written by: Lee Hyun-jin; Lee Gyu-man
- Produced by: Lee Yong-ho; Son Kwang-ik; Uhm Joo-young
- Starring: Park Yong-woo; Ryu Seung-ryong; Sung Dong-il
- Cinematography: Ki Se-hoon
- Edited by: Kim Chang-ju
- Music by: Choi Seung-hyun
- Distributed by: Lotte Entertainment
- Release date: February 17, 2011
- Running time: 132 minutes
- Country: South Korea
- Language: Korean
- Box office: US$12,229,392

Children... (Korean: 아이들; RR: Aideul) is a 2011 South Korean crime thriller film directed by Lee Gyu-man starring Park Yong-woo, Ryu Seung-ryong and Sung Dong-il. This film based on an actual unsolved murder case, the Frog Boys of Daegu.

== Plot ==
On March 26, 1991, the local elections are being held. Since it is a day off school, the five boys set off to the nearby mountain and never return. Their parents try to get the police to investigate right away, but the authorities are more concerned about guarding the election polls. Days later, thousands of police set on the mountain to search for clues as to what may have happened but nothing turns up. The parents take their pleas for the boys' return to the airways where their story captures the heart, mind and imagination of the nation. Various theories such as the involvement of North Korean spies and alien abduction comes up.

In 1996, a career-driven documentary maker, Kang Ji-seung is transferred to the small town after being disgraced for rigging an award-winning documentary. He then decides to investigate the case in the hopes of making a comeback. He teams up with an equally ambitious professor who hopes to make a name for himself by solving the crime where police failed. The professor's theory, which seems to have quite a bit of compelling evidence behind it, takes the pair in a direction that the police were reluctant to investigate.

The professor has the telephone recording of someone claiming to be one of the missing boys calling up his parents' home. However, the mother does not appear to be shocked to receive a call from her son. This leads the professor to suspect that the father and mother of this boy may know more than they have been letting on. While visiting the boys' home, everyone, from the boy's parents to his grandmother act strangely. The professor convinces the authorities to dig around the boy's home, but they find nothing. Nevertheless, the accusation destroys the family's reputation and the father dies without having cleared his name. Kang Ji-seung is soon transferred back to the city while the professor loses his job at the university.

Then in September 2002, the remains of the children are found in the woods on the same mountainside the children said they were visiting by two men who were gathering acorns. At first police claim it seemed likely that the boys got lost and froze to death during the night. The parents refuse to believe this since their sons used to play in the area all the time. Also, the search party had searched this area before but nothing came up at the time. After learning that the remains were found, Kang Ji-seung visits the forensic lab and learns that two of the skulls bear large holes and one has strange indentations made from an unidentified instrument. Their clothes were tied into knots used by sailors and bullet casings were found in the shallow, makeshift grave.

Meanwhile, Seoul is shaken by the news of the disappearance of two children in the city. Kang Ji-seung meets with the police officer who investigated the missing boys' case ten years ago. The officer reveals that on the night after the boys disappeared, he came across a mysterious young man who is always seen fishing in the area. However, the man fled in his jeep when the officer approached him. The officer decided to keep this a secret since Korea has a statute of limitation on major crimes and in 2006 it ran out on the case. Even if the killer was found at this point, he cannot be prosecuted. So, the officer decided to wait for him to commit another crime in order to trap him. To add to the mystery, the area where the remains were found had been searched numerous times since the boys were known to play there and yet, almost a decade later, their bodies suddenly show up there.

Through his license plate, Kang Ji-seung tracks the man down and breaks into his apartment when he is not home. To Kang Ji-seung's horror, there is a box containing little things owned by children. He also finds stacks of books tied up in knots used by sailors. Kang Ji-seung decides to wait for the culprit outside his apartment building to confront him when he gets home. However, Kang Ji-seung falls asleep and the culprit, realizing he is being watched, takes a picture of the reporter's car. The next morning, Kang Ji-seung's daughter goes missing. However, she is found soon after and claims she was helped by a man driving a passing by truck. Kang Ji-seung chases the truck down to a slaughter house. He confronts the suspect, who refuses to confess but hints that he might be the killer. Since Kang Ji-seung has no evidence to have the man arrested, he watches as the suspect walks away, presumably to escape from the city.

== Cast ==
- Park Yong-woo as Kang Ji-seung
- Ryu Seung-ryong as Hwang Woo-hyuk
- Sung Dong-il as Park Kyung-sik
- Sung Ji-ru as Jung-ho's father
- Kim Yeo-jin as Jung-ho's mother
- Joo Jin-mo as Director Ahn
- Park Byung-eun as Kim Joo-hwan
- Kim Gu-taek as Won-kil's father
- Park Mi-hyun as Won-kil's mother
- Lee Sang-hee as Yong-duk's father
- Seo Ju-hee as Yong-duk's mother
- Jo Deok-je as Dong-pil's father
- Seo Young-hwa as Dong-pil's mother
- Nam Sang-baek as Chul-woo's father
- Jeon Guk-hwan as Professor Cha
- Kwak Min-seok as police chief
- Ra Mi-ran as psychic
- Lee Si-eon as PD Yoon
- Tae In-ho as Producer Choi

== Release ==
The film was released on February 17, 2011 and netted a total of 1,867,736 admissions nationwide.
