= 2012 KBS Drama Awards =

26th edition of award ceremony

- Date: December 31, 2012
- Hosted by: Yoo Jun-sang; Youn Yuh-jung; Lee Jong-suk

Television coverage
- Network: KBS

The 2012 KBS Drama Awards is a ceremony honoring the outstanding achievement in television on the Korean Broadcasting System (KBS) network for the year of 2012. It was held on December 31, 2012 and hosted by actors Yoo Jun-sang, Lee Jong-suk and actress Youn Yuh-jung.

== Nominations and winners ==
(Winners denoted in bold)

Grand Prize (Daesang)
**Kim Nam-joo** – **My Husband Got a Family**
Top Excellence Award, Actor	Top Excellence Award, Actress
**Song Joong-ki** – **The Innocent Man**; **Yoo Jun-sang** – **My Husband Got a Family**; Choi Soo-jong – Dream of the Emperor; Chun Ho-jin – Bridal Mask, Seoyoung, My Daughter; Joo Won – Bridal Mask; Shin Hyun-joon – Ohlala Couple; Uhm Tae-woong – Man from the Equator	**Moon Chae-won** – **The Innocent Man**; Jang Na-ra – School 2013; Kim Jung-eun – Ohlala Couple; Kim Nam-joo – My Husband Got a Family; Lee Bo-young – Man from the Equator, Seoyoung, My Daughter; Youn Yuh-jung – My Husband Got a Family
Excellence Award, Actor in a Miniseries	Excellence Award, Actress in a Miniseries
**Shin Hyun-joon** – **Ohlala Couple**; Choi Daniel – School 2013; Gong Yoo – Big; Kim Kang-woo – Haeundae Lovers; Lee Dong-wook – Wild Romance	**Jang Na-ra** – **School 2013**; Bae Suzy – Big; Cho Yeo-jeong – Haeundae Lovers; Lee Min-jung – Big; Kim Jung-eun – Ohlala Couple
Excellence Award, Actor in a Mid-length Drama	Excellence Award, Actress in a Mid-length Drama
**Uhm Tae-woong** – **Man from the Equator**; Cha Tae-hyun – Jeon Woo-chi; Jang Keun-suk – Love Rain; Lee Joon-hyuk – Man from the Equator; Song Joong-ki – The Innocent Man	**Lee Bo-young** – **Man from the Equator**; Uee – Jeon Woo-chi; Im Yoona – Love Rain; Moon Chae-won and Park Si-yeon – The Innocent Man
Excellence Award, Actor in a Serial Drama	Excellence Award, Actress in a Serial Drama
**Joo Won** – **Bridal Mask**; Choi Soo-jong – Dream of the Emperor; Chun Ho-jin – Bridal Mask, Seoyoung, My Daughter; Lee Sang-yoon – Seoyoung, My Daughter; Yoo Jun-sang – My Husband Got a Family	**Youn Yuh-jung** – **My Husband Got a Family**; Han Chae-ah and Jin Se-yeon – Bridal Mask; Kim Nam-joo – My Husband Got a Family; Lee Bo-young – Seoyoung, My Daughter
Excellence Award, Actor in a Daily Drama	Excellence Award, Actress in a Daily Drama
**Kim Dong-wan** – **Cheer Up, Mr. Kim!**; **Kim Yeong-cheol** – **The Moon and Stars for You**; Jo Dong-hyuk – The Moon and Stars for You; Ryu Tae-joon – TV Novel: Dear My Sister; Sunwoo Jae-duk – TV Novel: Love, My Love	**Kim Ye-ryeong** – **TV Novel: Love, My Love**; **Seo Ji-hye** – **The Moon and Stars for You**; Choi Jung-yoon and Wang Ji-hye – Cheer Up, Mr. Kim!; Kyeon Mi-ri – TV Novel: Dear My Sister
Excellence Award, Actor in a One-Act/Special/Short Drama	Excellence Award, Actress in a One-Act/Special/Short Drama
**Sung Joon** – **Drama Special "Wetlands Ecology Report"**; **Yeon Woo-jin** – **Drama Special "Just an Ordinary Love Story"**; Bong Tae-gyu – Drama Special "Don't Worry, I'm a Ghost"; Im Ji-kyu – Drama Special "Do You Know Taekwondo?"; Namkoong Min – Drama Special "Still Picture"; Yu Oh-seong – Drama Special "Missing Case of National Assembly Member Jung Chi-sung"	**Park Shin-hye** – **Drama Special "Don't Worry, I'm a Ghost"**; **Yoo Da-in** – **Drama Special "Just an Ordinary Love Story"**; Jeon Ye-seo – Drama Special "My Prettiest Moments", "Gate of Non-Duality"; Kim Yong-rim – Drama Special "A Corner"; Moon Jeong-hee – Drama Special "Still Picture"; Shim Yi-young – Drama Special "Culprit Among Friends"
Best Supporting Actor	Best Supporting Actress
**Kim Sang-ho** – **My Husband Got a Family**; **Park Ki-woong** – **Bridal Mask**; Lee Jae-yong – Man from the Equator, Jeon Woo-chi; Lee Kwang-soo and Lee Sang-yeob – The Innocent Man; Park Hae-jin – Seoyoung, My Daughter	**Jo Yoon-hee** – **My Husband Got a Family**; Cha Hwa-yeon – Man from the Equator; Jin Kyung – My Husband Got a Family, The Innocent Man; Kim Jung-nan – Bridal Mask; Park Jung-ah – Seoyoung, My Daughter
Best New Actor	Best New Actress
**Lee Hee-joon** – **My Husband Got a Family**, **Jeon Woo-chi**; **Lee Jong-suk** – **School 2013**; Kang Min-hyuk – My Husband Got a Family; Lee Hyun-woo – Man from the Equator; Lee Jung-shin – Seoyoung, My Daughter; Seo In-guk – Love Rain	**Jin Se-yeon** – **Bridal Mask**; **Oh Yeon-seo** – **My Husband Got a Family**; Choi Yoon-young – Seoyoung, My Daughter; Hwang Sun-hee – TV Novel: Love, My Love, Wild Romance; Lee Yu-bi – The Innocent Man; Park Se-young – Love Rain, Man from the Equator
Best Young Actor	Best Young Actress
**Noh Young-hak** – **Dream of the Emperor**; Oh Jae-moo – Cheer Up, Mr. Kim!; Kwak Dong-yeon – My Husband Got a Family; Kim Woo-suk – Bridal Mask, Drama Special "Gate of Non-Duality"; Yeon Joon-seok – Cheer Up, Mr. Kim!, Drama Special "A Corner"	**Nam Ji-hyun** – **Drama Special "Girl Detective Park Hae-sol"**; Kim Hyun-soo – Bridal Mask, Dream of the Emperor; Lee Hye-in – Seoyoung, My Daughter, Dream of the Emperor; Roh Jeong-eui and Seo Ji-hee – Cheer Up, Mr. Kim!; Seo Shin-ae – Drama Special "SOS – Save Our School"
Netizen Award, Actor	Netizen Award, Actress
**Song Joong-ki** – **The Innocent Man**	**Moon Chae-won** – **The Innocent Man**; **Im Yoon-ah** – **Love Rain**
Popularity Award, Actor	Popularity Award, Actress
**Joo Won** – **Bridal Mask**	**Bae Suzy** – **Big**
Best Couple Award	Best Writer
**Lee Hee-joon** and **Jo Yoon-hee** – **My Husband Got a Family**; **Lee Sang-yoon** and **Lee Bo-young** – **Seoyoung, My Daughter**; **Song Joong-ki** and **Moon Chae-won** – **The Innocent Man**; **Yoo Jun-sang** and **Kim Nam-joo** – **My Husband Got a Family**
**Lee Hee-joon** and **Jo Yoon-hee** – **My Husband Got a Family**; **Lee Sang-yoon** and **Lee Bo-young** – **Seoyoung, My Daughter**; **Song Joong-ki** and **Moon Chae-won** – **The Innocent Man**; **Yoo Jun-sang** and **Kim Nam-joo** – **My Husband Got a Family**	**Park Ji-eun** – **My Husband Got a Family**
**Lee Hee-joon** and **Jo Yoon-hee** – **My Husband Got a Family**; **Lee Sang-yoon** and **Lee Bo-young** – **Seoyoung, My Daughter**; **Song Joong-ki** and **Moon Chae-won** – **The Innocent Man**; **Yoo Jun-sang** and **Kim Nam-joo** – **My Husband Got a Family**	PD Award
**Lee Hee-joon** and **Jo Yoon-hee** – **My Husband Got a Family**; **Lee Sang-yoon** and **Lee Bo-young** – **Seoyoung, My Daughter**; **Song Joong-ki** and **Moon Chae-won** – **The Innocent Man**; **Yoo Jun-sang** and **Kim Nam-joo** – **My Husband Got a Family**	**Uhm Tae-woong** – **Man from the Equator**
