= Cheer Up, Mr. Kim! =

South Korean TV series

- Promotional poster
- Also known as: Be Strong, Mr. Kim! Way to Go, Mr. Kim!
- Hangul: 힘내요, 미스터 김!
- RR: Himnaeyo, miseuteo Gim!
- MR: Himnaeyo, misŭt'ŏ Kim!
- Genre: Family, Drama, Romance
- Written by: Jo Jung-joo
- Directed by: Hong Suk-goo; Kim Jong-yeon
- Starring: Kim Dong-wan; Choi Jung-yoon; Wang Ji-hye; Yang Jin-woo
- Opening theme: "Only Love" - Kim Dong-wan
- Country of origin: South Korea
- Original language: Korean
- No. of episodes: 124

Production
- Executive producer: Moon Bo-hyun
- Running time: 35 minutes Mondays to Fridays at 20:25 (KST)

Original release
- Network: Korean Broadcasting System
- Release: November 5, 2012 – April 26, 2013

Cheer Up, Mr. Kim! (Korean: 힘내요, 미스터 김!) is a 2012–2013 South Korean television series that aired on KBS1 from November 5, 2012, to April 26, 2013, on Mondays to Fridays at 20:25 for 124 episodes. It stars Kim Dong-wan in the title role of Mr. Kim, a male housekeeper who becomes the guardian of four children.

== Plot ==
Kim Tae-pyung is the guardian of three (later, four) children, none of which are his own. Abandoned himself as a child, Tae-pyung took on the role of a parent at the age of seventeen when his newborn niece was orphaned, unwilling to see her sent to an orphanage. Since then, he has taken on responsibility for three other children, whose parents are friends unable to care for them. Shouldering such responsibility at a young age, Tae-pyung was unable to complete his education, and makes a living being a domestic cleaner and housekeeper, providing for his charges through hard work and scrimping and saving. Although his prospects of finding love are repeatedly dashed by those unwilling to take on his children, Tae-pyung continues to hope to find someone who will love him for who he is, and who will appreciate a man doing his duty for his family.

== Cast ==
=== Main characters ===
- Kim Dong-wan as Kim Tae-pyung

Male housekeeper, guardian of four children. He is depicted as a hardworking and dedicated father figure to his children. His keen optimism, generosity, and willingness to go to great lengths to help others impacts a lot of people in his life.

- Choi Jung-yoon as Chun Ji-young

School nurse, has known Tae-pyung since they were teenagers and is the daughter of his landlord. She is a divorcee and has had a crush on Tae-pyung for a long time.

- Wang Ji-hye as Lee Woo-kyung

Schoolteacher, daughter of a chaebol household which employs Tae-pyung as a housekeeper. Dedicated to a fault, her students are her primary concern. Woo-kyung is also independent and headstrong.

- Yang Jin-woo as Baek Gun-wook

Illegitimate son of a chaebol family, Woo-kyung's friend since childhood. He returned to Korea after studying in the United States to help run his father's company. Selfish and determined, he prefers things to go his way.

=== Supporting characters ===
The Kim "children"

- Seo Ji-hee as Kim Hee-rae

Daughter of Tae-pyung's deceased elder brother, and the only one who is Tae-pyung's biological relative. She is strong-willed, bluntly honest and stubborn, mostly out of concern for her uncle.

- Roh Jeong-eui as Nam Song-ah

Daughter of Tae-pyung's friends, who are lying low to avoid creditors. She is the most affectionate towards Tae-pyung. She has asthma and often wears a mask outdoors.

- Yeon Joon-seok as Ri Chul-ryong

Teenage defector from North Korea with no family in the South. He has spent most of his adolescence looking for his only brother, until he settles to enroll in college. Despite being diligent and obedient, he suffers from low self-confidence due to the discrimination he faces as a North Korean.

- Oh Jae-moo as Ko Joo-sung

Teenager made homeless by a father absconding from creditors, and the most recent member to join the Kim household. He is spoiled and rude, yet emotionally fragile and has a kinder side. He is also classmates with Hee-rae, whom he often quarrels with.

Chun household

- Baek Il-seob as Chun Kyung-sool

Ji-young's father and Tae-pyung's benefactor and landlord, who offered the first floor of his house to Tae-pyung's family. Tae-pyung considers him a mentor and frequently seeks him out for advice.

- Lee Doo-il as Chun Myung-kwan

Kyung-sool's son, Ji-young's elder brother.

- Jin Kyung as Jo Jae-nam

Myung-kwan's wife, who is often skeptical about Tae-pyung. A shallow, gossipy housewife, she values wealth and social position above all, and constantly grooms her daughter to become a suitable wife for a notable family.

- Kim Soo-yeon as Chun Joo-hee

Daughter of Myung-kwan and Jae-nam, who is pressured by her parents to become someone she doesn't want to be. She shares her room with her aunt, Ji-young.

Lee household

- Choi Il-hwa as Lee Sang-gook

Father of Woo-kyung, who is antagonistic towards Tae-pyung as he believes housekeeping is not a desirable job for a man.

- Sa Mi-ja as Oh Ssang-shim

Grand-aunt of Woo-kyung, who did the housekeeping before Tae-pyung was hired. She is kinder and more reasonable than her younger sister.

- Jung Jae-soon as Oh Ssang-ji

Grandmother of Woo-kyung. Demanding and hot-tempered, she often favors Ho-kyung over Woo-kyong.

- Kang Sung-min as Lee Ho-kyung

Older brother of Woo-kyung, who uses a wheelchair after an accident. He and Woo-kyung care deeply about each other's welfare. He is agoraphobic and spends most of his time blogging. He and Tae-pyung become friends and share a great bond.

Baek household

- Lee Jung-gil as Baek Jae-sang

Father of Gun-wook.

- Kim Hye-sun as Hong Hae-sook

Mother of Gun-wook.

Extended cast

- Song Seo-yeon as Joo Yeon-ji
- Kim Deok-hyeon as Director Kim
- Yoo Yeon-ji as Jang Hye-ryung
- Lee Jong-gu as Moon Gyo-soo
- Jo Jung-rae as Byung-jin

== Ratings ==
Episode #	Original broadcast date	Average audience share			
Episode #	Original broadcast date	TNmS Ratings		AGB Nielsen	
Episode #	Original broadcast date	Nationwide	Seoul National Capital Area	Nationwide	Seoul National Capital Area
1	5 November 2012	27.6%	25.2%	23.6%	21.8%
2	6 November 2012	25.7%	23.3%	20.8%	18.4%
3	7 November 2012	23.7%	20.9%	21.2%	19.5%
4	8 November 2012	26.8%	24.9%	23.2%	21.9%
5	9 November 2012	24.1%	21.8%	21.4%	20.0%
6	12 November 2012	28.5%	25.7%	23.5%	22.3%
7	13 November 2012	27.1%	23.8%	24.8%	22.9%
8	14 November 2012	24.1%	21.8%	22.9%	21.5%
9	15 November 2012	25.8%	23.3%	24.0%	22.5%
10	16 November 2012	24.8%	22.7%	22.4%	20.1%
11	19 November 2012	27.2%	24.9%	25.3%	23.2%
12	20 November 2012	27.0%	23.7%	24.2%	22.3%
13	21 November 2012	23.9%	18.6%	22.9%	20.6%
14	22 November 2012	25.4%	20.2%	23.8%	22.2%
15	23 November 2012	25.5%	21.7%	23.1%	21.4%
16	26 November 2012	29.2%	24.9%	25.6%	23.1%
17	27 November 2012	29.5%	25.9%	25.1%	22.7%
18	28 November 2012	28.7%	24.3%	24.0%	22.0%
19	29 November 2012	27.5%	23.7%	25.8%	23.4%
20	30 November 2012	27.1%	24.2%	24.1%	22.6%
21	3 December 2012	28.9%	26.3%	23.9%	21.8%
22	4 December 2012	17.6%	14.0%	17.1%	15.7%
23	5 December 2012	27.7%	24.3%	24.5%	22.6%
24	6 December 2012	29.1%	26.0%	25.7%	24.2%
25	7 December 2012	29.0%	25.8%	26.4%	24.5%
26	10 December 2012	19.8%	16.4%	17.9%	17.4%
27	11 December 2012	29.8%	27.9%	25.4%	23.5%
28	12 December 2012	29.0%	26.1%	25.9%	24.8%
29	13 December 2012	28.4%	25.0%	24.4%	21.8%
30	14 December 2012	28.2%	24.4%	26.3%	24.3%
31	17 December 2012	28.0%	23.7%	25.3%	23.8%
32	18 December 2012	29.8%	26.4%	26.9%	24.9%
33	20 December 2012	25.3%	23.0%	24.6%	23.0%
34	21 December 2012	28.1%	25.3%	24.8%	21.9%
35	24 December 2012	27.9%	24.6%	25.8%	24.1%
36	25 December 2012	33.0%	30.1%	28.1%	24.6%
37	26 December 2012	30.6%	27.1%	26.4%	23.8%
38	27 December 2012	28.9%	27.4%	27.7%	25.4%
39	28 December 2012	29.2%	24.6%	26.4%	23.7%
40	31 December 2012	27.9%	24.1%	24.3%	21.2%
41	1 January 2013	31.5%	27.1%	28.3%	26.0%
42	2 January 2013	29.9%	25.4%	27.4%	24.6%
43	3 January 2013	30.7%	26.0%	28.8%	26.3%
44	4 January 2013	31.8%	28.2%	27.6%	25.0%
45	7 January 2013	31.9%	27.5%	27.7%	25.6%
46	8 January 2013	32.4%	28.0%	29.6%	28.8%
47	9 January 2013	31.1%	26.9%	27.3%	24.9%
48	10 January 2013	32.0%	27.6%	29.3%	27.2%
49	11 January 2013	28.9%	25.1%	27.1%	24.9%
50	14 January 2013	32.4%	27.8%	28.4%	27.1%
51	15 January 2013	33.1%	29.9%	28.6%	26.9%
52	16 January 2013	30.0%	25.6%	27.9%	25.7%
53	17 January 2013	31.4%	27.8%	28.1%	26.0%
54	18 January 2013	29.9%	26.6%	27.3%	24.7%
55	21 January 2013	30.7%	26.2%	29.7%	28.2%
56	22 January 2013	30.9%	26.1%	29.6%	27.5%
57	23 January 2013	30.8%	27.1%	28.3%	26.1%
58	24 January 2013	31.7%	28.2%	30.3%	29.0%
59	25 January 2013	31.2%	28.0%	29.2%	27.8%
60	28 January 2013	32.4%	29.3%	29.4%	27.4%
61	29 January 2013	30.4%	27.0%	29.4%	28.3%
62	30 January 2013	28.7%	25.0%	27.9%	26.3%
63	31 January 2013	30.8%	28.1%	30.3%	28.2%
64	1 February 2013	31.6%	28.1%	28.8%	27.0%
65	4 February 2013	31.8%	27.5%	29.0%	26.5%
66	5 February 2013	32.1%	27.5%	29.4%	27.4%
67	6 February 2013	30.8%	26.3%	27.6%	25.8%
68	7 February 2013	32.1%	27.8%	29.1%	26.6%
69	8 February 2013	29.5%	26.0%	27.1%	25.1%
70	11 February 2013	31.0%	28.3%	26.9%	24.8%
71	12 February 2013	30.8%	28.5%	29.5%	27.9%
72	13 February 2013	30.0%	26.8%	29.0%	27.6%
73	14 February 2013	32.2%	28.4%	28.9%	26.9%
74	15 February 2013	30.2%	27.4%	28.6%	27.9%
75	18 February 2013	32.1%	29.7%	30.3%	29.4%
76	19 February 2013	32.2%	28.7%	30.2%	29.0%
77	20 February 2013	31.0%	27.9%	28.3%	27.3%
78	21 February 2013	32.8%	31.1%	29.4%	27.7%
79	22 February 2013	30.6%	26.5%	27.3%	24.8%
80	25 February 2013	30.5%	27.2%	29.9%	27.5%
81	26 February 2013	31.8%	28.0%	29.7%	27.1%
82	27 February 2013	28.0%	24.9%	27.7%	25.6%
83	28 February 2013	30.5%	27.1%	28.6%	27.6%
84	1 March 2013	25.2%	21.5%	28.0%	26.7%
85	4 March 2013	28.1%	23.8%	28.4%	26.9%
86	5 March 2013	30.9%	27.5%	29.8%	28.9%
87	6 March 2013	30.4%	26.5%	28.8%	27.5%
88	7 March 2013	33.3%	29.9%	30.0%	29.1%
89	8 March 2013	28.7%	23.9%	28.1%	27.9%
90	11 March 2013	31.2%	27.7%	28.5%	26.9%
91	12 March 2013	31.1%	27.6%	29.6%	28.2%
92	13 March 2013	28.5%	25.1%	27.3%	25.9%
93	14 March 2013	30.8%	25.7%	28.7%	27.4%
94	15 March 2013	28.9%	25.0%	28.7%	27.5%
95	18 March 2013	30.7%	26.2%	30.4%	29.3%
96	19 March 2013	29.1%	23.9%	28.2%	26.3%
97	20 March 2013	29.7%	26.1%	27.0%	24.8%
98	21 March 2013	30.5%	26.7%	30.8%	29.2%
99	22 March 2013	27.8%	22.6%	28.6%	27.1%
100	25 March 2013	29.1%	24.6%	28.7%	26.9%
101	26 March 2013	29.6%	24.5%	27.4%	24.8%
102	27 March 2013	30.5%	27.0%	27.7%	26.2%
103	28 March 2013	30.1%	25.1%	29.0%	28.2%
104	29 March 2013	30.2%	26.1%	26.1%	24.5%
105	1 April 2013	32.7%	28.6%	28.8%	27.6%
106	2 April 2013	31.6%	27.8%	28.6%	27.5%
107	3 April 2013	29.0%	24.2%	27.0%	25.8%
108	4 April 2013	31.1%	26.5%	27.0%	25.4%
109	5 April 2013	29.4%	24.9%	26.8%	25.0%
110	8 April 2013	31.3%	27.0%	28.4%	26.8%
111	9 April 2013	30.1%	24.9%	29.5%	28.1%
112	10 April 2013	27.3%	23.3%	26.4%	24.4%
113	11 April 2013	29.8%	25.5%	28.3%	27.3%
114	12 April 2013	28.1%	24.4%	27.3%	26.4%
115	15 April 2013	31.0%	26.5%	28.2%	27.4%
116	16 April 2013	29.3%	24.6%	28.2%	27.1%
117	17 April 2013	28.5%	25.1%	27.4%	26.3%
118	18 April 2013	30.5%	26.1%	28.4%	27.2%
119	19 April 2013	27.3%	23.5%	26.7%	24.7%
120	22 April 2013	29.9%	26.1%	28.7%	27.5%
121	23 April 2013	31.7%	27.9%	29.9%	28.0%
122	24 April 2013	27.8%	24.8%	26.8%	25.8%
123	25 April 2013	30.3%	26.8%	29.0%	28.5%
124	26 April 2013	28.7%	26.0%	27.7%	27.1%

Key

- Blue-lowest rated episode
- Red-highest rated episode

== Awards and nominations ==
Year	Award	Category	Recipient	Result
2012	KBS Drama Awards	Excellence Award, Actor in a Daily Drama	Kim Dong-wan	Won
2012	KBS Drama Awards	Excellence Award, Actress in a Daily Drama	Choi Jung-yoon	Nominated
2012	KBS Drama Awards	Excellence Award, Actress in a Daily Drama	Wang Ji-hye	Nominated
2012	KBS Drama Awards	Best Young Actor	Oh Jae-moo	Nominated
2012	KBS Drama Awards	Best Young Actor	Yeon Joon-seok	Nominated
2012	KBS Drama Awards	Best Young Actress	Roh Jeong-eui	Nominated
2012	KBS Drama Awards	Best Young Actress	Seo Ji-hee	Nominated
2013	6th Korea Drama Awards	Excellence Award, Actor	Kim Dong-wan	Won
