= Beautiful Sunday =

- Directed by: Jin Kwang-gyo
- Written by: Jin Kwang-gyo; Kim Kwon-tae
- Produced by: Seok Myeong-hong; Choe Yun
- Starring: Park Yong-woo; Namkoong Min; Min Ji-hye
- Cinematography: Lee Ki-won
- Edited by: Ko Im-pyo
- Music by: Lee Chang-hui; Lee Jong-gyo
- Distributed by: Showbox
- Release date: March 29, 2007
- Running time: 117 minutes
- Country: South Korea
- Language: Korean
- Box office: US$1,203,727

Beautiful Sunday (Korean: 뷰티풀 선데이) is a 2007 South Korean crime drama film.

== Plot ==
Police detective Kang has resorted to illegal activities to pay for the medical bills of his wife, who is in a coma. One day he is approached by a man named Min-woo, who confesses to killing his own wife. Kang realises that the murder and his wife's accident are in fact connected.

== Cast ==
- Park Yong-woo as Detective Kang
- Namkoong Min as Min-woo
- Min Ji-hye as Soo-yeon
- Lee Ki-young as Lee Gi-cheol
- Kim Dong-ha as Jo Sang-tae
- Kim Eung-soo as Criminal unit chief
- Oh Jung-se as Yoo Chang-won
- Park Byung-eun as Detective Min
