= Handphone (film) =

- Film poster
- Hangul: 핸드폰
- RR: Haendeupon
- MR: Haendŭp'on
- Directed by: Kim Han-min
- Written by: Kim Mi-hyeon
- Produced by: Heo Tae-gu; Kim Min-gi; Heo Chang; Eom Ju-yeong
- Starring: Uhm Tae-woong; Park Yong-woo
- Cinematography: Park Sang-hun
- Edited by: Kim Sun-min
- Music by: Kim Jun-seong
- Production companies: SK Telecom; Fineworks
- Distributed by: M-Line Distribution
- Release date: February 19, 2009
- Running time: 137 minutes
- Country: South Korea
- Language: Korean
- Box office: US$3.9 million

Handphone (Korean: 핸드폰) is 2009 South Korean crime thriller film directed by Kim Han-min. Based on a screenplay by Kim Mi-hyeon, it stars Uhm Tae-woong, Park Yong-woo, Park Sol-mi and Lee Se-na in lead roles. The soundtrack of the film was composed by Kim Jun-seong. It revolves around Yoon Jin-ah, an aspiring actress who incidentally receives her sex clip with her former lover on phone and later gets rescued by his so-called fan Seung-min.

Handphone was unofficially remade in India as Chappa Kurishu (Malayalam;2011), which itself was remade into Tamil as Pulivaal (2014), while the 2011 Kannada film Vishnuvardhana also had resemblances to the core plot of the original film.

== Plot ==
Talent manager Seung-min sees Yoon Jin-ah, a rising actress, as his one last hope to turn his life around. Just as Jin-ah is on the path to stardom, he receives a threat from her former lover and gets her sex clip on his phone. Seung-min tracks down the culprit and retrieves the tape but ends up losing his phone. He realizes there is one last evidence of the sex tape on his phone and anxiously looks for it. Yi-gyu, who found Seung-min's phone, calls Seung-min's wife and asks her to come pick it up. On the night the phone was supposed to be returned, Yi-gyu doesn't show up. Now Yi-gyu is the one holding the leverage. Seung-min tries to do everything possible to get back his phone but Yi-gyu's demands are escalating to the point of no return.

== Cast ==
- Uhm Tae-woong as Oh Seung-min
- Park Yong-woo as Jung Yi-gyu
- Park Sol-mi as Kim Jeong-yeon
- Lee Se-na as Yoon Jin-ah
- Kim Nam-gil as Jang Yoon-ho (Jin-ah's ex-boyfriend)
- Hwang Bo-yeon as Kim Dae-jin (Seung-min's assistant)
- Park Gil-su as Choi (loan shark)
- Kim Gu-taek as Choi's bodyguard
- Kim Yu-seok as Han Joon-soo (attorney)
- Joo Jin-mo as Captain Kim
- Seo Woo as Yi-gyu's sister
- Kim Jong-seok as wedding toastmaster
- Kim Gu-ra as radio DJ who interviews Jin-ah
- Jeon Bae-soo as sound engineer at radio station
- Bong Man-dae as movie director
- Choi Ju-bong as man who lost dog in the store
- Lee A-rin as mart female employee 2
- Jun In-kul as employee of management company
- Kwak Byung-kyu as lead detective
- Tae In-ho

== Unofficial remakes ==
Three South Indian films have been made whose plots have close resemblance to Handphone, but they are not officially credited as remakes. The films are Chaappa Kurishu (lit. "Heads or Tails"; Malayalam; 2011), its remake Pulivaal ("Tail of Tiger"; Tamil; 2014) and Vishnuvardhana (Kannada; 2011), the latter being remade later into Bachchan (Bengali; 2014).
