= Resurrection (South Korean TV series) =

2005 South Korean television series

- Promotional poster
- Also known as: Rebirth; Revenge; Life Again
- Genre: Melodrama; Romance; Thriller
- Written by: Kim Ji-woo
- Directed by: Park Chan-hong; Jeon Chang-geun
- Starring: Uhm Tae-woong; Han Ji-min
- Music by: Ji Pyung-kwon
- Opening theme: "Innocent" by Kim Tae-hoon
- Composer: Ji Pyung-kwon
- Country of origin: South Korea
- Original language: Korean
- No. of episodes: 24

Production
- Producer: Hong Seong-deok
- Production location: Korea
- Cinematography: Byun Choon-ho
- Editor: Kim Young-joo
- Running time: 70 minutes Wednesdays and Thursdays at 21:50 (KST)

Original release
- Network: Korean Broadcasting System
- Release: 1 June – 18 August 2005

Resurrection (Korean: 부활; RR: Buhwal; also known as Rebirth and Revenge) is a 2005 South Korean television series starring Uhm Tae-woong, Han Ji-min, So Yi-hyun, Go Joo-won, Kang Shin-il, Kim Kap-soo, Kim Kyu-chul, Gi Ju-bong, and Lee Jung-gil. The series is about a man who pretends to be his identical twin brother in order to unearth the conspiracy surrounding his father's death and wreak revenge on his murderers. It aired on KBS2 from June 1 to August 18, 2005, on Wednesdays and Thursdays at 21:50 for 24 episodes.

The series is the first installment of the revenge trilogy by director Park Chan-hong and writer Kim Ji-woo, followed by The Devil in 2007 and Don't Look Back: The Legend of Orpheus in 2013.

== Plot ==
After a horrific car crash kills his father, young Ha-eun is taken in by a family of strangers and raised to be a caring, happy young man (Uhm Tae-woong). He becomes a police officer and begins to look into the death of his father, only to discover some horrifying truths about not only the accident, but also his own identity. Ha-eun discovers that his name is really Yoo Kang-hyuk and that he has a twin brother called Shin-hyuk (also played by Uhm), who is now VP of a large company. When a cruel twist of fate gives Ha-eun the opportunity to assume his brother's identity, he sees this as his chance to discover the truth about his tragic past and avenge the wrongs done to him and his family.

== Cast ==
- Uhm Tae-woong as Seo Ha-eun/Yoo Shin-hyuk
  - Kang San as young Ha-eun
  - Kwak Jung-wook as teenage Ha-eun
- Han Ji-min as Seo Eun-ha
  - Park Eun-bin as teenage Eun-ha
- So Yi-hyun as Lee Kang-joo
- Kang Shin-il as Seo Jae-soo
- Kim Kap-soo as Lee Tae-joon
- Kim Kyu-chul as Choi Dong-chan
- Lee Jung-gil as Kang In-chul
- Gi Ju-bong as Jung Sang-gook
- Go Joo-won as Jung Jin-woo
- Go Myung-hwan as Kim Soo-chul
- Jo Jae-wan as Ahn Jae-hoon
- Sunwoo Eun-sook as Kim Yi-hwa
- Yoo Hye-jung as Yoon Mi-jung
- Lee Dong-gyu as Park Hee-soo
- Choi Yong-min as Heo Deok-woo
- Lee Yeon-hee as Kang Shin-young
- Lee Dae-yeon as Gyung Gi-do
- Kim Yoon-seok as Cheon Gong-myung ("President Cheon")
- Joo Jin-mo as Park Sang-chul
- Ahn Nae-sang as Yoo Geon-ha
- Lee Han-wi as Im Dae-shik
- Kim Gi-bok as Hwang Jong-in
- Choi Won-seok as Yang Man-chul
- Nam Hyun-joo as Man-chul's wife
- Jung Ho-bin as Lee Jung-mu
- Park Kwang-jung

== Reception ==
In the same timeslot as hit series My Lovely Sam Soon, ratings suffered as a result, going down as much as 7% compared to Sam-soon's high 40s. But broadcaster KBS received numerous requests from viewers to re-run the show during weekends, so they could watch both dramas; the re-runs recorded encouraging numbers. And after Sam-soon finished airing, ratings for Resurrection shot up to 20%, reaching a peak of 22.9% on the drama's finale, with the number of messages posted by viewers on its bulletin board surpassing one million. Called a "mania drama" (Korean slang for cult hit - TV series with a tremendous following online, that somehow end up struggling in the ratings), Resurrection gained praise for its tight plotting, complex characterization, and a career-making, emotionally intense performance from Uhm Tae-woong.

== Ratings ==
| Date | Episode | Nationwide | Seoul |
|---|---|---|---|
| 2005-06-01 | 1 | 10.9% (16th) | 11.0% (15th) |
| 2005-06-02 | 2 | 9.6% (17th) | 9.7% (16th) |
| 2005-06-08 | 3 | 7.8% | 8.5% |
| 2005-06-09 | 4 | 6.9% | 9.4% |
| 2005-06-15 | 5 | 8.6% | 9.2% (19th) |
| 2005-06-16 | 6 | 9.6% (20th) | 9.6% |
| 2005-06-22 | 7 | 8.4% | 9.0% (20th) |
| 2005-06-23 | 8 | 9.1% (18th) | 9.3% (17th) |
| 2005-06-29 | 9 | 8.4% | 10.3% |
| 2005-06-30 | 10 | 9.5% (20th) | 9.7% (20th) |
| 2005-07-06 | 11 | 9.3% (19th) | 9.2% |
| 2005-07-07 | 12 | 9.7% (19th) | 9.2% (20th) |
| 2005-07-13 | 13 | 9.6% | 9.3% (18th) |
| 2005-07-14 | 14 | 9.9% (20th) | 10.1% (17th) |
| 2005-07-20 | 15 | 9.1% (18th) | 8.7% |
| 2005-07-21 | 16 | 8.0% | 8.7% |
| 2005-07-27 | 17 | 16.0% (8th) | 15.3% (8th) |
| 2005-07-28 | 18 | 15.9% (9th) | 14.8% (10th) |
| 2005-08-03 | 19 | 16.1% (7th) | 15.5% (7th) |
| 2005-08-04 | 20 | 15.9% (9th) | 14.3% (10th) |
| 2005-08-10 | 21 | 15.9% (8th) | 15.9% (9th) |
| 2005-08-11 | 22 | 16.3% (9th) | 16.1% (10th) |
| 2005-08-17 | 23 | 20.2% (5th) | 19.8% (5th) |
| 2005-08-18 | 24 | 22.9% (4th) | 23.3% (3rd) |
| Average | | 11.9% | 11.9% |

Source: TNS Media Korea

== Awards and nominations ==
| Year | Award | Category | Recipient | Result | Ref. |
|---|---|---|---|---|---|
| 2005 | KBS Drama Awards | Excellence Award, Actor | Uhm Tae-woong | Won | |
| 2005 | KBS Drama Awards | Best Supporting Actor | Kim Kyu-chul | Nominated | |
| 2005 | KBS Drama Awards | Best Supporting Actor | Kang Shin-il | Nominated | |
| 2005 | KBS Drama Awards | Best New Actress | Han Ji-min | Won | |
| 2005 | KBS Drama Awards | Best Writer | Kim Ji-woo | Won | |
| 2005 | KBS Drama Awards | Best Couple Award | Uhm Tae-woong and Han Ji-min | Won | |
| 2006 | 42nd Baeksang Arts Awards | Best Actor (TV) | Uhm Tae-woong | Nominated | |

== International broadcast ==
Resurrection first aired in Japan on cable channel So-net beginning April 5, 2006, which was lead actor Uhm Tae-woong's birthday. Its popularity led to reruns on multiple channels, including Tokyo MX, FBC Fukuoka TV and TV Hokkaido.

== International remakes ==
In October 2015, Batman producer Michael Uslan acquired the rights to remake five KBS dramas in the United States, including Resurrection. Though the series was unsuccessful in the ratings during its run, KBS Content Business Office manager Jung Ji-young explained that Uslan chose it for its strong and dramatic plot.

In 2016, the series was adapted in Turkey under the title Kış Güneşi, which is also known under its English-translated title Winter Sun.
