= Park Yong-woo =

South Korean actor

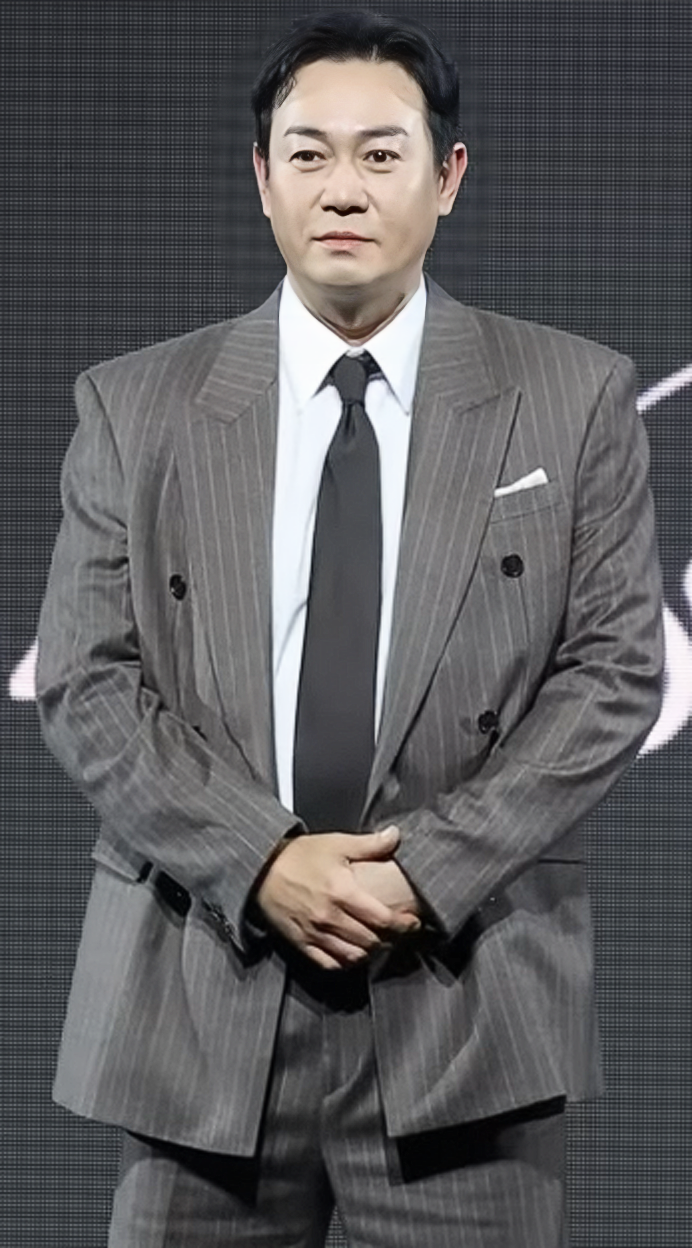
- Park in 2025
- Born: March 16, 1971 (age 55); Seoul, South Korea
- Education: Chung-Ang University – Theater and Film
- Occupation: Actor
- Years active: 1993–present
- Agent: Prain TPC

Korean name
- Hangul: 박용우
- Hanja: 朴埇佑
- RR: Bak Yongu
- MR: Pak Yongu

Park Yong-woo (Korean: 박용우; born March 16, 1971) is a South Korean actor.

== Early life ==
Park Yong-woo's father was an engineering professor and his mother was a music teacher. As a child he was shy and expressed himself poorly. Instead, he nurtured his imagination. When he first chose to become an actor, Park felt hampered by the fact that he didn't have any childhood or family trauma to draw from, but later realized that a vivid imagination was the key to his acting process because it didn't require him to show his "naked face."

== Career ==
=== Supporting actor ===
Park failed the college entrance exams twice before he was accepted to the prestigious Theater and Film department at Chung-Ang University in 1991. He failed twice more when he joined MBC's actor's auditions, then finally passed in 1995. Park spent a decade playing minor and supporting roles on television and film, notably in Shiri (1999), Ditto (2000) and Age of Warriors (2003). He later said those ten years of experience enabled him to have greater freedom and control with his acting, and that he believes a person is not just born a good actor, but rather good acting requires much preparation and work, with some luck thrown in. Park said, "I guess every actor dreams of playing a main character and I'm not an exception. But for me, it is more important to become a good actor regardless of how big my roles are."

=== 2005–2006: Career breakthrough ===
In 2005, Park drew critical notice with his much-praised portrayal of the influential son of a paper mill owner in Kim Dae-seung's period thriller Blood Rain (2005). He won Best Supporting Actor honors at the Chunsa Film Art Awards and the Korean Film Awards, as well as nominations at the Grand Bell Awards and Blue Dragon Film Awards.

But his career breakthrough would come in his first leading role, in dark romantic comedy My Scary Girl (2006) opposite Choi Kang-hee. Titled "Sweet, Bloodthirsty Lover" in Korean, Park played a timid college lecturer in his late 20s who finally finds his first girlfriend, only he begins to suspect that she may be a serial killer. With a relatively low budget and lead actors who were not particularly famous at the time, Son Jae-gon's debut film was a sleeper hit and became the tenth top-selling domestic film of the year with 2,286,745 tickets sold. After its release, witty dialogue from the film were continuously quoted and parodied, and their performances made Park and Choi stars.

=== Leading roles ===
Park spent the next several years acting in various genres. He played a kindly handyman with a crush on a piano teacher in For Horowitz (2006), a world-weary cop investigating the murders of orphaned girls in The World of Silence (2006), a detective who sacrifices his ethics to pay for his wife's medical bills in Beautiful Sunday (2007), one husband of two partner-swapping married couples in Love Now (2007), and a suave con artist out to steal treasure in Once Upon a Time (2008).

At the press conference of Kim Han-min's 2009 thriller Handphone, Park said he hoped viewers wouldn't interpret the two characters as simply good and evil, but as real people with understandable motivations within the context of their situations.

=== 2010: Return to television ===
2010 marked Park's return to television for the first time in six years in the period medical drama Jejungwon, about the establishment of Gwanghyewon (later renamed Jejungwon) in 1885, the nation's first "modern" Western hospital which historical records show treated sick people regardless of their economic status despite the hierarchical society of the era. Loosely based on a real-life person, the protagonist Park played is born a poor butcher's son and becomes Joseon's first surgeon and an independence fighter.

Park said he didn't hesitate to take the role, describing his character as someone who "doesn't stop trying to achieve his goals and starts thinking not only about saving people's lives but also his country. Although he seems somewhat unsophisticated, for ordinary people he is a humane and caring doctor, and I tried to portray those qualities so that viewers would empathize with him." He added that he liked the social message imparted by the drama which resonates in the present day, and that he felt his character's story reflects his own journey toward becoming an actor.

=== 2011–present ===
In the mystery suspense film Children... (2011), Park played a documentary filmmaker who delves into the unsolved Frog Boys case. Initially driven by ambition and opportunism, he later becomes sincerely attached to it.

Multicultural comedy Papa followed in 2012, in which his character is an entertainment manager who becomes an adoptive father to six children in the United States, and encourages the eldest daughter to join an audition program.

In drama series My Lover, Madame Butterfly, Park played the white knight to a divorced, has-been actress.

He next appeared in Song Il-gon's Forest of Time (2012), which blurs the boundary between documentary and narrative filmmaking, as Park and Japanese actress Rina Takagi spend ten days searching for the reportedly 7,200-year-old Jōmon Sugi, a cryptomeria tree in the renowned forest of Yakushima, a UNESCO World Heritage Site that inspired the Hayao Miyazaki animated film Princess Mononoke.

In 2014, he played a genius sculptor who suffers from a progressive muscular paralysis after the Korean War in Late Spring.

Park said in a 2007 interview, "Although I am not completely devoted to acting, it may look that way because I am not lucky enough to be able to enjoy my life fully. Although I usually get bored doing something for a long time, acting makes me feel alive and changes me; even though it entails pain. I want to be an extraordinary actor while being an ordinary person."

In 2018, he stars in the medical exorcism drama Priest.

== Filmography ==
=== Film ===
- Decision to Leave (2022)
- Spiritwalker (2021)
- Unforgettable (2016)
- Late Spring (2014)
- Hwayi: A Monster Boy (2013)
- Forest of Time (2012)
- Papa (2012)
- Children... (2011)
- Battlefield Heroes (2011) (cameo)
- Handphone (2009)
- Once Upon a Time (2008)
- Love Now (2007)
- Beautiful Sunday (2007)
- The World of Silence (2006)
- For Horowitz (2006)
- My Scary Girl (2006)
- The Art of Seduction (2005)
- Blood Rain (2005)
- Mr. Gam's Victory (2004)
- Lovers' Concerto (2002)
- Musa the Warrior (2001)
- Say Yes (2001)
- Ditto (2000)
- Shiri (1999)
- Naked Being (1998)
- Two Cops 3 (1998)
- The Hole (1997)

=== Television series ===
- Walking On Thin Ice (KBS2, 2025)
- Hunter with a Scalpel (X+U Mobile TV)
- Tracer (Wavve/MBC, 2022) as Oh Young
- Priest (OCN, 2018)
- Life Tracker Lee Jae-goo (SBS, 2015)
- My Lover, Madame Butterfly (SBS, 2012)
- Jejungwon (SBS, 2010)
- Best Mother (SBS, 2005)
- Terms of Endearment (KBS2, 2004)
- Age of Warriors (KBS1, 2003)
- Sun-hee and Jin-hee (MBC, 2001)
- Crystal (SBS, 1999)
- Paper Crane (KBS2, 1998)
- Run Barefoot (MBC, 1998)
- Myth of a Hero (MBC, 1997)
- A Bluebird Has It (KBS2, 1997)
- Hometown Legends: "Geomryongsoae" (KBS2, 1997)
- MBC Best Theater: "My American-style Boyfriend" (MBC, 1997)
- Ganyiyeok (MBC, 1996)
- Dangerous Love (MBC, 1996)
- MBC Best Theater: "Keep Your Letter in the Freezer" (MBC, 1995)
- Apartment (MBC, 1995)
- The Fourth Republic (MBC, 1995)
- Professor Oh's Family (SBS, 1993)

== Theater ==
- The Sting (musical, 2001)

== Awards and nominations ==
Name of the award ceremony, year presented, category, nominee of the award, and the result of the nomination
| Award ceremony | Year | Category | Nominee / Work | Result | Ref. |
|---|---|---|---|---|---|
| Asia Contents Awards | 2022 | Best Supporting Actor | Tracer | Nominated | |
| Baeksang Arts Awards | 2022 | Best Supporting Actor – Film | Spiritwalker | Nominated | |
| Chunsa Film Art Awards | 2005 | Best Supporting Actor | Blood Rain | Won | |
| KBS Drama Awards | 2003 | Excellence Award, actor | Age of Warriors | Won | |
| Korean Film Awards | 2005 | Best Supporting Actor | Blood Rain | Won | |
| MBC Drama Awards | 2022 | Best Character Award | Tracer | Nominated | |
