= Don't Look Back: The Legend of Orpheus =

2013 South Korean television series

- Promotional poster
- Also known as: Shark
- Hangul: 상어
- Lit.: Shark
- RR: Sangeo
- MR: Sangŏ
- Genre: Revenge; Drama; Thriller; Romance
- Written by: Kim Ji-woo
- Directed by: Park Chan-hong; Cha Young-hoon
- Starring: Kim Nam-gil; Son Ye-jin
- Composers: Kim Hyung-seok, Lee Im-woo
- Country of origin: South Korea
- Original language: Korean
- No. of episodes: 20

Production
- Executive producer: Hwang Eui-kyung
- Producer: Ji Byung-hyun
- Production locations: Korea, Japan
- Cinematography: Park Seong; Jang Byung-wook
- Editor: Kim Young-joo
- Running time: 60 minutes
- Production company: Annex Telecom

Original release
- Network: KBS2
- Release: May 27 – July 30, 2013

Don't Look Back: The Legend of Orpheus (Korean: 상어; lit. 'Shark') is a 2013 South Korean television series starring Kim Nam-gil and Son Ye-jin. It aired on KBS2 from May 27 to July 30, 2013, on Mondays and Tuesdays at 21:55 (KST).

The series is the third installment of the revenge trilogy by director Park Chan-hong and writer Kim Ji-woo, following Resurrection in 2005 and Lucifer in 2007.

== Synopsis ==
Han Yi-soo's (Kim Nam-gil) father is the chauffeur of the owners of Gaya Hotel Group, the family of Jo Hae-woo (Son Ye-jin). The chauffeur is persuaded to take the blame for a hit-and-run accident caused by the drunken son of the family. But when he changes his mind, he is murdered before he can recant. Yi-soo, then a high schooler, tries to find out the truth and exonerate his father. He calls Hae-woo, his first love, but a truck deliberately rams the phone box. Following the attempt on his life, Yi-soo disappears and ends up in Japan, where a wealthy and influential Japanese-Korean businessman, Yoshimura Junichiro (Lee Jae-gu) adopts him.

12 years later he returns to Korea with a new identity as Japanese-Korean businessman Yoshimura Jun and carefully laid plans. Hae-woo, who believed that Yi-soo was dead, becomes a prosecutor to find out the truth about what happened to him. She marries Oh Joon-young (Ha Seok-jin), the son of the Chief Prosecutor Oh Hyun-shik (Jung Won-joon) and also a close friend of Yi-soo in their school days. No one in Korea, including Hae-woo, recognizes Yi-soo, even though he constantly finds excuses to meet Hae-woo and even after Hae-woo realizes that Yi-soo is alive. Yi-soo and Hae-woo become caught between love and revenge.

== Cast ==
=== Main ===
- Kim Nam-gil as Han Yi-soo / Yoshimura Jun / Kim Joon
  - Yeon Joon-seok as young Yi-soo
- Son Ye-jin as Jo Hae-woo, the only daughter and heir to Gaya Hotel Group, who refuses to live life as an heiress and becomes a prosecutor.
  - Kyung Soo-jin as young Hae-woo
- Lee Jung-gil as Jo Sang-gook, Hae-woo's grandfather and CEO of Gaya Hotel Group.
- Ha Seok-jin as Oh Joon-young, Hae-woo's husband.
  - Noh Young-hak as young Joon-young
- Lee Hanee as Jang Young-hee, Yi-soo's secretary.
- Nam Bo-ra as Han Yi-hyun, Yi-soo's sister.
  - Ahn Seo-hyun as young Yi-hyun
- Park Won-sang as Detective Byun Bang-jin
- Kim Kyu-chul as Jo Eui-seon, Hae-woo's father.
- Lee Soo-hyuk as Kim Soo-hyun, prosecution office's investigator.

=== Supporting ===
- Lee Si-eon as Kim Dong-soo
  - Oh Hee-joon as young Dong-soo
- Lee Jae-gu as Junichiro Yoshimura
- Jung Won-joong as Chief Prosecutor Oh Hyun-shik, Joon-young's father and Hae-woo's boss.
- Jung In-gi as Han Young-man, Yi-soo's father.
- Jung Kyung-soon as Mrs. Park
- Kim Min-sang as Jung Man-chul
- Jo Jae-wan as Detective Oh
- So Hee-jung as Kim Young-joo
- Choi Deok-moon as Kang Hee-soo
- Jung Ae-yeon as Lee Hwa-young
- Ham Sung-min as Lee-yu
- Joo Jin-mo as the old Korean man in Okinawa
- Min Sung-wook as reporter Jae Myung (cameo, episode 19–20)

== Production ==
This production marked Son Ye-jin's return to television three years after Personal Taste in 2010, and the first acting project for Kim Nam-gil after being discharged from mandatory military service. Regarding his revenge trilogy, director Park Chan-hong explained that the first part, Resurrection focused on the man seeking revenge; then part two The Devil included the victim of revenge in the story; and the last part took into account both the victim and perpetrator in the structure of the story.

On April 29, 2013, the production company Annex Telecom released promotional stills of the two leads, Son Ye-jin and Kim Nam-gil, at the drama's first shoot on April 24–25 in Gangnam District, Seoul. This was followed by a 40-second teaser video on May 9, showing Kim and a shark swimming. Promoter Shall We Talk explained, "The reason we named the drama Shark and why Kim Nam-gil talks about sharks in the clip is because the lives of the two main characters are similar to that of sharks, which can't stop swimming."

== Original soundtrack ==
1. Shark's Tale - Various Artists
2. 천국과 지옥 사이 (Between Heaven and Hell) - BoA
3. 슬픈 동화 (Sad Story) - Jung Dong-ha of Boohwal
4. Alone in the Dark - Various Artists
5. 몇 날 며칠 (Countless Days) - Na Yoon-kwon
6. Lost - Various Artists
7. 지독한 사랑 (Poison Love) - Lim Jeong-hee
8. Assassin - Various Artists
9. 고독한 왈츠 (Lonely Waltz) - Various Artists

== Ratings ==
In the table below, the blue numbers represent the lowest ratings and the red numbers represent the highest ratings.

Ep.	Original broadcast date	Average audience share			
Ep.	Original broadcast date	Nielsen Korea		TNmS	
Ep.	Original broadcast date	Nationwide	Seoul	Nationwide	Seoul
1	May 27, 2013	8.2%	8.7%	7.3%	8.2%
2	May 28, 2013	6.7%	7.5%	7.0%	7.3%
3	June 3, 2013	6.7%	7.0%	6.5%	7.4%
4	June 4, 2013	7.3%	7.9%	7.5%	7.5%
5	June 10, 2013	8.8%	9.4%	7.4%	8.2%
6	June 11, 2013	8.5%	9.0%	8.0%	8.6%
7	June 17, 2013	7.9%	8.8%	6.9%	7.6%
8	June 18, 2013	6.9%	7.2%	6.2%	7.0%
9	June 24, 2013	7.8%	8.5%	7.5%	8.9%
10	June 25, 2013	7.0%	7.6%	7.4%	7.5%
11	July 1, 2013	9.4%	10.6%	9.4%	10.6%
12	July 2, 2013	10.3%	11.5%	9.7%	11.1%
13	July 8, 2013	9.4%	10.7%	9.9%	11.5%
14	July 9, 2013	10.4%	11.9%	10.6%	11.3%
15	July 15, 2013	10.5%	11.6%	9.6%	10.1%
16	July 16, 2013	9.8%	10.1%	10.5%	11.3%
17	July 22, 2013	9.7%	10.8%	9.8%	10.0%
18	July 23, 2013	9.8%	10.8%	10.0%	10.4%
19	July 29, 2013	8.4%	8.7%	9.3%	10.5%
20	July 30, 2013	10.7%	11.8%	10.3%	11.4%
Average		8.7%	9.5%	8.5%	9.3%

== Awards and nominations ==
Year	Award	Category	Recipient	Result
2013	6th Korea Drama Awards	Best New Actress	Kyung Soo-jin	Nominated
2013	KBS Drama Awards	Top Excellence Award, Actor	Kim Nam-gil	Nominated
2013	KBS Drama Awards	Top Excellence Award, Actress	Son Ye-jin	Nominated
2013	KBS Drama Awards	Excellence Award, Actor in a Mid-length Drama	Kim Nam-gil	Nominated
2013	KBS Drama Awards	Excellence Award, Actress in a Mid-length Drama	Son Ye-jin	Nominated
2013	KBS Drama Awards	Best New Actress	Kyung Soo-jin	Won
2013	KBS Drama Awards	Best New Actress	Nam Bo-ra	Nominated
2013	KBS Drama Awards	Best Young Actor	Yeon Joon-seok	Won
2014	47th WorldFest-Houston International Film Festival	Gold Remi Award for Dramatic TV Series	Shark	Won
2014	50th Baeksang Arts Awards	Best Screenplay	Kim Ji-woo	Nominated
2014	9th Seoul International Drama Awards	Outstanding Korean Drama	Shark	Nominated
2014	9th Seoul International Drama Awards	Outstanding Korean Drama OST	Between Heaven and Hell - BoA	Nominated
2014	9th Seoul International Drama Awards	Outstanding Korean Drama OST	Countless Days - Na Yoon-kwon	Nominated
