= Seo Ji-hee =

South Korean actress (born 1998)

- Born: April 4, 1998 (age 28); South Korea
- Occupation: Actress
- Years active: 2004–present
- Agent: Jiho Entertainment

Korean name
- Hangul: 서지희
- RR: Seo Jihui
- MR: Sŏ Chihŭi

Seo Ji-hee (Korean: 서지희; born April 4, 1998) is a South Korean actress.

== Filmography ==
=== Television series ===
Year	Title	Role
2001	Stepmother	young Sang-mi
2004	People of the Water Flower Village	
2004	My 19 Year Old Sister-in-Law	young Choi Soo-ji
2004	Love Story in Harvard	Chun Da-woon
2005	Green Rose	young Oh Soo-ah
2005	Smile of Spring Day	Kim Ah-young
2005	My Lovely Sam Soon	Hyun Mi-joo
2005	Nonstop 5	Child at the playground (episode 194)
2006	One Fine Day	young Seo Ha-neul
2007	Blue Fish	young Jung Eun-soo
2007	Fly High	Kang Soo-na
2007	First Wives' Club	Young-yi
2009	Jolly Widows	Kang Na-jung
2010	Three Sisters	Choi Bo-ram
2011	Flames of Desire	young Yoon Jung-sook
2011	Warrior Baek Dong-soo	young Jang Mi-so
2012	Moon Embracing the Sun	young Seol
2012	Ugly Cake	young Han So-jung
2012	Cheer Up, Mr. Kim!	Kim Hee-rae
2015	Angry Mom	Hwang Min-ju
2015	The Merchant: Gaekju 2015	young Chun So-rye
2015	I Have a Lover	Baek-ji

=== Film ===
Year	Title	Role
2005	Sympathy for Lady Vengeance	Eun-joo
2007	Miracle on 1st Street	young Myung-ran
2014	The Con Artists	young Eun-ha

== Awards and nominations ==
Year	Award	Category	Nominated work	Result
2012	KBS Drama Awards	Best Young Actress	Cheer Up, Mr. Kim!	Nominated
