= Yeon Joon-seok =

South Korean actor (born 1995)

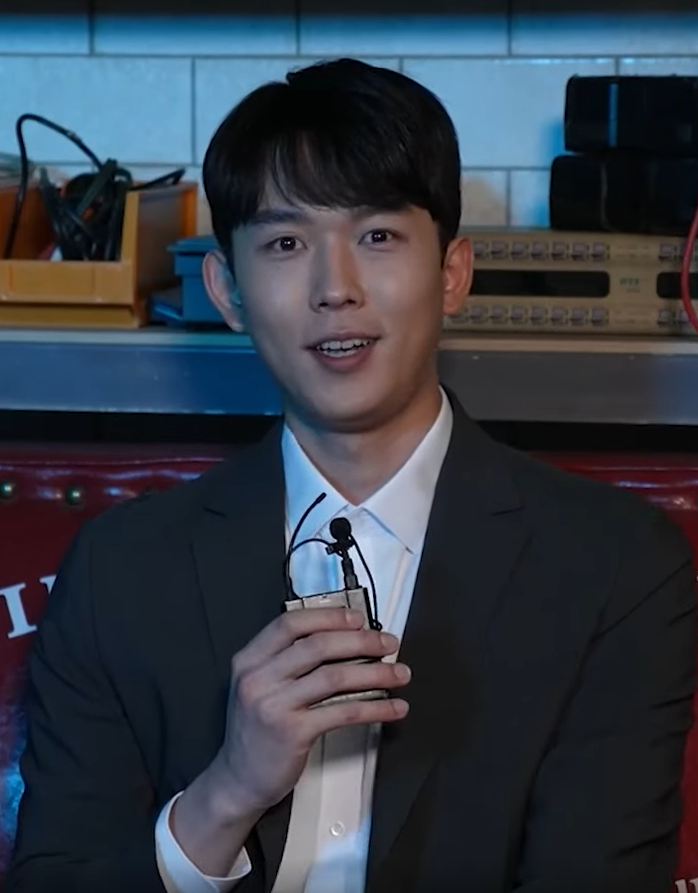
- Yeon in Oct 2022
- Born: December 15, 1995 (age 30); South Korea
- Education: Chung-Ang University - Theater and Film
- Occupation: Actor
- Years active: 2005–present

Korean name
- Hangul: 연준석
- Hanja: 延俊錫
- RR: Yeon Junseok
- MR: Yŏn Chunsŏk

Yeon Joon-seok (born December 15, 1995) is a South Korean actor.

== Filmography ==
=== Film ===
| Year | Title | Role |
|---|---|---|
| 2005 | Duelist | young bridegroom |
| 2006 | Bloody Reunion | young Kim Myung-ho |
| 2007 | Sunshower (short film) | Hyeon-tae |
| 2008 | A Bowl of Udon (short film) | Child's older brother |
| 2008 | Unforgettable | Choon-sam |
| 2008 | Sweet Lie | Park Dong-sik in junior high |
| 2011 | Boy | Jin-woo |
| 2016 | Unforgettable (Pure Love) | San-dol |
| 2018 | 60 Days of Summer | Jae-hoon |

=== Television series ===
| Year | Title | Role |
|---|---|---|
| 2004 | Oolla Boolla Blue-jjang | Student whose money gets stolen (bit part) |
| 2007 | Heaven & Earth | Se-joon |
| 2008 | Iljimae | Han-woo |
| 2009 | Brilliant Legacy | Go Eun-woo |
| 2010 | Definitely Neighbors | Yoon Jong-min |
| 2012 | Happy Ending | Kim Dong-ha |
| 2012 | KBS Drama Special: "A Corner" | Choi Dong-ha |
| 2012 | Cheer Up, Mr. Kim! | Ri Cheol-ryong |
| 2013 | Don't Look Back: The Legend of Orpheus | young Han Yi-soo |
| 2013 | Reply 1994 | Kim Dong-woo |
| 2014 | KBS Drama Special: "Monster" | Han Tae-seok |
| 2014 | Make Your Wish | Song Seok-hyun |
| 2016 | Choco Bank | Bae Dal-su |
| 2018 | Your House Helper | Park Ga-ram |
| 2018 | My Strange Hero | Oh Young-min |
| 2022 | Bad Prosecutor | Lee Chul-gi |

== Theater ==
| Year | Title | Role | Ref. |
|---|---|---|---|
| 2022–2023 | Red | Ken | |

== Awards and nominations ==
| Year | Award | Category | Nominated work | Result |
|---|---|---|---|---|
| 2012 | KBS Drama Awards | Best Young Actor | Cheer Up, Mr. Kim!, A Corner | Nominated |
| 2013 | Herald DongA TV Lifestyle Awards | Male Newcomer of the Year | Don't Look Back: The Legend of Orpheus | Won |
| 2013 | KBS Drama Awards | Best Young Actor | Don't Look Back: The Legend of Orpheus | Won |
| 2014 | KBS Drama Awards | Best Actor in a One-Act/Special/Short Drama | Monster | Nominated |
