= The Blade and Petal =

2013 South Korean television series

- Promotional poster
- Also known as: Sword and Flower; Knife and Flower
- Genre: Historical; Romance; Drama; Action
- Written by: Kwon Min-soo
- Directed by: Kim Yong-soo; Park Jin-seok
- Starring: Kim Ok-vin; Uhm Tae-woong; Choi Min-soo; Kim Yeong-cheol
- Composers: Park Seong-jin; Choi Min-chang
- Country of origin: South Korea
- Original language: Korean
- No. of episodes: 20

Production
- Executive producer: Lee Geon-joon
- Producer: Yoon Jae-hyeok
- Production location: Korea
- Cinematography: Lee Yoon-jung; Kim Gyeong-ho
- Editors: Seon Han-saem; Bae Young-joo
- Running time: Wednesdays and Thursdays at 21:55 (KST)
- Production companies: Love Letter; KBS Media; Blade and Petal SPC

Original release
- Network: KBS2
- Release: July 3 – September 5, 2013

The Blade and Petal (Korean: 칼과 꽃; RR: Kalgwa kkot; lit. 'Sword and Flower') is a 2013 South Korean television series that aired on KBS2 from July 3 to September 5, 2013, on Wednesdays and Thursdays at 21:55 for 20 episodes. Kim Ok-vin and Uhm Tae-woong play star-crossed lovers doomed by their fathers' epic battle for political power during the Goguryeo dynasty.

== Synopsis ==
The period drama takes place in the twilight years of Goguryeo. Military general Yeon Gaesomun wants to go to war with the Tang dynasty, but the pacifist King Yeongnyu opts for diplomacy and national stability, and in their battle of wills the palace council is divided between the "hawks" and the "doves."

Yeongnyu has two children, the princess So-hee, and the crown prince Hwangwon. The king is particularly proud of his older daughter So-hee for being intelligent, assertive, empathetic, and an excellent swordswoman, and he respects her opinion during their frequent discussions about matters of state and politics. Despite being the heir, the younger, more frail Hwangwon acknowledges that he isn't particularly suited to rule, and prefers to quietly read his books in his quarters. Nevertheless, the siblings share a close, loving relationship with each other and their father.

Meanwhile, hoping for an audience with his father, Yeon Gaesomun's illegitimate son Choong, born of a slave mother, arrives in the capital. While on the road, the crown prince and princess are attacked in their carriage; Yeon Gaesomun and his allies had hired assassins to fake a Tang attack, since this could become grounds for war. Observing this from a rooftop, the masked Choong uses his bow and arrow to kill the one surviving assassin in custody, to prevent him from implicating his father. Shortly after, Choong and So-hee meet in the marketplace and fall in love at first sight.

After his father rejects him, Choong decides to make something of his life and becomes a member of the royal guard, with So-hee ignorant of his paternity. When he foils another assassination attempt, Choong gets recognized by the king's nephew Jang as the masked archer, and he is sentenced to death. Yeon Gaesomun preys on Jang's ambitions, and together they plot to save Choong from hanging, unbeknownst to the grieving So-hee, who believes he has died. But Choong cannot resist revealing himself to her, and the lovers joyfully reunite.

Fearing that the general's power and influence are rapidly overtaking the throne's, Yeongnyu orders Yeon Gaesomun to oversee the construction of the defensive wall Cheolli Jangseong in a remote province, which would effectively exile him. In retaliation, Yeon Gaesomun and his co-conspirators plan a revolt; it fails because of Choong's intervention, but the crown prince becomes seriously injured after he falls off a poisoned horse. The king unexpectedly declares So-hee as his successor to the throne, dashing Jang's hopes and causing him to finally shift his allegiance to Yeon Gaesomun.

Yeongnyu asks the Geumhwadan, a secret group of warriors meant to protect the royal family and the citizens in times of uprising and war, to investigate. But they have difficulty finding unequivocal evidence linking Yeon Gaesomun to the failed rebellion. Seeing no other solution to their ideological impasse which is causing political unrest, Yeongnyu decides to have the general and his fellow traitors assassinated. But Yeon Gaesomun has his own carefully laid plans in place, and he warns Choong to correctly choose a side, with his family. He tells Choong to cut off the princess's head to prove his loyalty, and orders a soldier to kill Choong if he acts against them. Enormously conflicted yet unable to betray his father, Choong agrees to join the plot, but only because he's secretly planning to save So-hee from what's to come.

Thus, Yeon Gaesomun, his allies and their troops enter the palace, launching a bloody coup. The royal army stands down under Jang's orders, and the plotters massacre the ministers in the council and the remaining loyal soldiers. So-hee's brother the crown prince is murdered in front of her eyes. The Geumhwadan urge the king to escape, but he stands his ground in the throne room, facing his enemies with dignity. Truly believing that he is doing what's best for Goguryeo, Yeon Gaesomun commits regicide by stabbing Yeongnyu straight through the gut with his sword. Once she sees Choong there, the utterly devastated So-hee assumes the worst that he was part of the conspiracy, not realizing that Choong risked his life fighting his father's own soldiers to protect her.

Yeon Gaesomun installs Jang as the new king Bojang. But he is only a puppet king, and Yeon Gaesomun becomes the Dae Magniji ("Grand Prime Minister"), or the de facto ruler and dictator of Goguryeo. Believing that So-hee had died in the coup, Choong reverses his earlier stance and joins Yeon Gaesomun's cause in order to gain power, castigating himself that if only he hadn't been powerless, he might've been able to save her. But So-hee is alive, and being hidden by the Geumhwadan. She renames herself Moo-young (meaning "shadowless" because she no longer exists in the world), and vows to avenge the death of her family.

== Title ==
In one of the flashbacks, Yeongnyu asks his daughter which she thought was stronger — the sword or the flower. He tells her that the sword can easily cut off the flower, but the flower can bloom again after being cut. And in the constant cycle of cut-and-bloom, the sword would inevitably rust and give way. Yeongnyu concludes, "The sword is not to be used to cut the flower, but to protect the flower."

Conversely, according to another saying, "Flowers wither like love, only blades are eternal."

== Cast ==
=== Main characters ===
- Kim Ok-vin as Princess So-hee/Moo-young

Daughter of the king. Proud, loyal and capable, the princess loses everything when her father and brother are assassinated. Vowing revenge, she cross-dresses as a male warrior to infiltrate the Choeuibu, Yeon Gaesomun's elite group of intelligence agents.

- Uhm Tae-woong as Yeon Choong
  - Chae Sang-woo as young Yeon Choong

Yeon Gaesomun's illegitimate son. Despite his talent, he finds he cannot rise higher in the ranks because his mother was a servant. Choong wants nothing more than to be accepted and acknowledged by his father, so he joins the palace guard to prove his warrior skills and gets assigned as the princess's bodyguard.

- Choi Min-soo as Yeon Gaesomun

A powerful military general who comes from a long line of political players. Because of the increasing frequency of Tang dynasty's attacks against Goguryeo cities, he believes that swift and more aggressive retaliation is necessary. He wants the king to declare war in order to prevent a possible Tang invasion.

- Kim Yeong-cheol as King Yeongnyu

The 27th ruler of Goguryeo. A former soldier, he believes that war would ravage his country and that of neighboring kingdoms Silla and Baekje, and therefore diplomacy, not war, is the solution to their problem with the Tang. Yeongnyu tells his council, "It is not the strong who survive — it is those who survive who are strong."

- On Joo-wan as Jang (later King Bojang)

The 28th, and last ruler of Goguryeo. The nephew of Yeongnyu, he betrays his family to side with Yeon Gaesomun, who places him on the throne as a puppet king.

- No Min-woo as Yeon Namsaeng

Yeon Gaesomun's eldest legitimate son.

- Park Soo-jin as Mo-seol

A female warrior on Yeon Gaesomun's side.

- Lee Jung-shin as Shi-woo

A master swordsman and the youngest of the princess's bodyguards.

=== Supporting characters ===
Geumhwadan

- Kim Sang-ho as So Sa-beon
- Jo Jae-yoon as Boo-chi
- Yoo Seung-mok as Seol-young
- Kim Hyo-seon as Young-hae
- Hyun Seung-min as Cho-hee
- Yoo Jae-myung as Cho-hee's father
- Shin Hye-jeong as Dal-ki
- Kwak Jung-wook as Chi-woon

King Yeongnyu's faction

- Lee Tae-ri (Note: Credited as Lee Min-ho.) as Crown Prince Hwangwon
- Lee Dae-ro as Seon Hoe-young
- Kim Joo-young as Hae Tae-soo
- Jeon Hyun as Tae-kyung
- Yoon Jin-ho as Yeon Jung-mo

Yeon Gaesomun's faction

- Gu Won as Ho-tae
- Ahn Dae-yong as Yeon Jung-ro
- Lee Dae-yeon as Do-soo
- Park Yoo-seung as On Sa-moon
- Park Joo-hyung as assassin

Neutral nobles

- Joo Jin-mo as Yang Moon
- Hyun Chul-ho as Yang Jin-wook
- Jeon Jin-ki as Sun Do-hae

Choeuibu

- Lee Won-jong as Jang-po
- Lee Yi-kyung as Tae-pyung
- Kim Dong-seok as Ji-kwan

Extended cast

- Moon Hyuk as Jin-goo
- Bang Hyung-joo as Choon-myung
- Yoon So-hee as Nang-ga
- Park Sang-yeon as Jang's bodyguard
- Tae In-ho as Jang's bodyguard
- Shin Hoo as Yeong-boo

== Ratings ==
Episode #	Original broadcast date	Average audience share			
Episode #	Original broadcast date	TNmS Ratings		AGB Nielsen	
Episode #	Original broadcast date	Nationwide	Seoul National Capital Area	Nationwide	Seoul National Capital Area
1	3 July 2013	7.0%	7.0%	6.7%	6.9%
2	4 July 2013	5.5%	5.8%	6.4%	6.6%
3	10 July 2013	4.3%	5.3%	5.4%	5.1%
4	11 July 2013	4.3%	4.7%	5.3%	4.9%
5	17 July 2013	5.0%	5.2%	4.5%	4.9%
6	18 July 2013	4.1%	5.0%	5.8%	5.4%
7	24 July 2013	3.8%	4.3%	5.6%	5.1%
8	25 July 2013	4.2%	4.9%	5.8%	5.6%
9	31 July 2013	5.1%	6.1%	5.5%	5.2%
10	1 August 2013	4.7%	4.7%	5.0%	5.0%
11	7 August 2013	5.1%	4.9%	6.3%	6.4%
12	8 August 2013	4.7%	5.5%	6.5%	6.3%
13	14 August 2013	4.9%	5.8%	6.4%	6.1%
14	15 August 2013	4.1%	4.4%	4.6%	4.4%
15	21 August 2013	4.4%	4.7%	5.7%	5.4%
16	22 August 2013	3.9%	4.7%	4.5%	4.7%
17	28 August 2013	3.3%	3.4%	5.0%	4.7%
18	29 August 2013	4.0%	4.3%	5.4%	5.1%
19	4 September 2013	3.0%	3.6%	5.0%	4.7%
20	5 September 2013	3.2%	3.4%	5.3%	5.5%
Average		4.4%	4.9%	5.5%	6.0%

== Awards and nominations ==
Year	Award	Category	Recipient	Result
2013	KBS Drama Awards	Top Excellence Award, Actor	Uhm Tae-woong	Nominated
2013	KBS Drama Awards	Excellence Award, Actor in a Mid-length Drama	Uhm Tae-woong	Nominated
2013	KBS Drama Awards	Excellence Award, Actress in a Mid-length Drama	Kim Ok-vin	Nominated
2013	KBS Drama Awards	Best Supporting Actor	Choi Min-soo	Nominated
2013	KBS Drama Awards	Best Young Actress	Hyun Seung-min	Nominated
2014	2nd Asia Rainbow TV Awards	Best Costume Drama	The Blade and Petal	Nominated

== International broadcast ==
It began airing in Japan on cable channel KNTV on March 18, 2013.

It began airing in Thailand on PPTV on October 12, 2014.

It began airing in Indonesia on RTV on January 16, 2016.
