= Han Ji-min =

South Korean actress (born 1982)

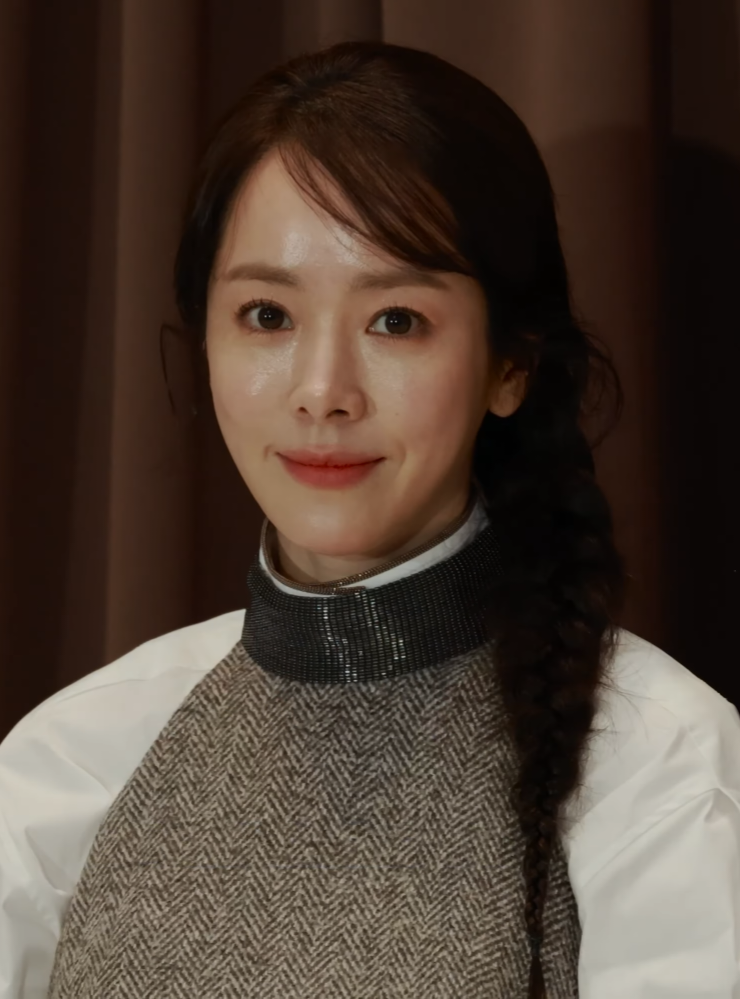
- Han in October 2025
- Born: November 5, 1982 (age 43); Seoul, South Korea
- Education: Seoul Women's University (B.A. in Social Welfare)
- Occupation: Actress
- Years active: 1999–present
- Agent: BH Entertainment

Korean name
- Hangul: 한지민
- Hanja: 韓志旼
- RR: Han Jimin
- MR: Han Chimin
- Website: bhent.co.kr

Han Ji-min (Korean: 한지민; born November 5, 1982) is a South Korean actress. After minor roles in All In (2003) and Dae Jang Geum (2003–2004), Han had her breakout role in revenge series Resurrection (2005). This was followed by leading roles in period dramas Capital Scandal (2007) and Yi San (2007–2008), contemporary dramas Cain and Abel (2009) and Padam Padam (2011–2012), romantic dramas Rooftop Prince (2012), Familiar Wife (2018), and The Light in Your Eyes (2019), as well as drama film Miss Baek (2018) for which won Best Actress at the 55th Baeksang Arts Awards. Han has since starred in the series Our Blues (2022), Behind Your Touch (2023), and Love Scout (2025)

== Career ==
=== 2003–2010: Beginnings and breakthrough ===
Han Ji-min started her career in show business while still a high school student. She made various commercial films (CF) and music videos before gaining wider attention in 2003, when she appeared in hit Korean television dramas All In and Dae Jang Geum. Han said she hadn't dreamed of becoming a serious actress, but changed her mind after starring in All In, where she played the teenage counterpart of the drama's main character, played by popular actress Song Hye-kyo.

Han achieved a breakthrough with her performance in the critically acclaimed mania drama Resurrection in 2005. She then challenged herself by playing a cute yet ambitious tomboy who dreams of becoming a pilot in her first movie Blue Swallow.

A car accident on the set of Wolf seriously injured Han and her co-star Eric Mun, causing the drama to be delayed repeatedly until the decision was finally made to discontinue it with only three episodes aired. After a long recovery for Mun, the two actors reunited instead in the drama Super Rookie Ranger (also known as Invincible Parachute Agent or Korea Secret Agency).

Han continued to act in TV dramas, with memorable turns as a straitlaced resistance fighter in Capital Scandal and a royal concubine in the historical drama Yi San. Known for her sweet, innocent and fragile image and her depictions of good girls, Han surprised audiences with her performance as a sexy femme fatale in Detective K: Secret of the Virtuous Widow.

=== 2011–2017: Diverse genres ===
Han played a cynical veterinarian in Padam Padam, written by famous drama writer Noh Hee-kyung, which aired on newly launched cable channel jTBC. She then starred in Rooftop Prince, about a Joseon-era prince who time-travels to the 21st century where he meets his dead beloved's doppelgänger. The popularity of Rooftop Prince garnered Han several awards, and increased her international profile, notably in Japan.

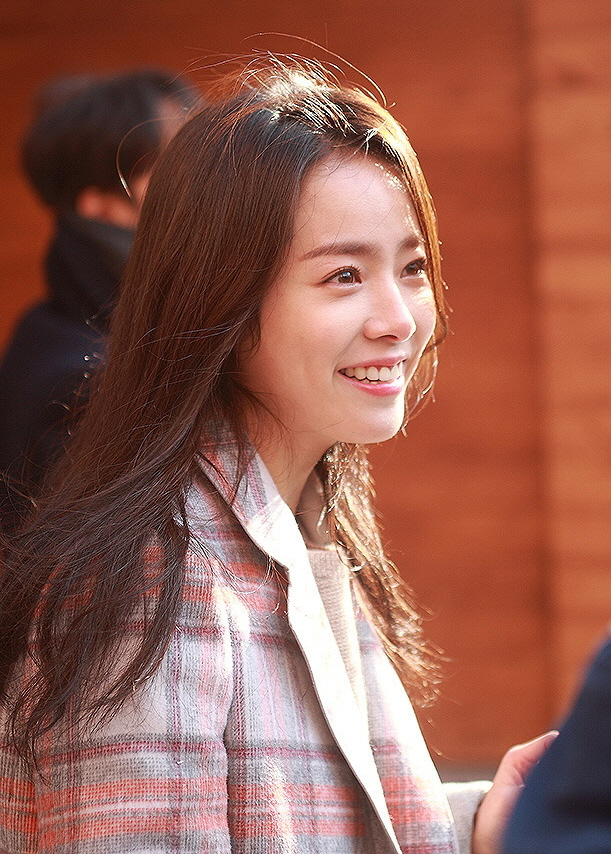
Han in December 2013

In October 2013, Han left her talent agency S.M. Entertainment's SM C&C and joined Lee Byung-hun's BH Entertainment.

In 2014, she starred in the opposites-attract romantic comedy film The Plan Man, about a methodical, mysophobic librarian who falls for a spontaneous, adventurous musician. Following that, she played the dowager Queen Jeongsun in period film The Fatal Encounter, who is the fierce political rival of her step-grandson King Jeongjo. Han next reunited with The Fatal Encounter co-star Hyun Bin in the 2015 suspense series Hyde Jekyll, Me, in the role of a circus master who falls for a theme park owner with split personality disorder.

In 2016, Han starred in action thriller The Age of Shadows, based on the 1920s about anti-Japanese independence workers' plots and betrayals. In 2017, Han was cast in romantic short film titled Two Rays of Light alongside Park Hyung-sik.

=== 2018–present: Critical acclaim ===
In 2018, Han starred in the film Miss Baek, playing the titular protagonist; an ex-convict who is emotionally closed up due to the social stigma. Han's performance in the film won her the Best Actress award at the prestigious Blue Dragon Film Awards and Baeksang Arts Awards as well as other major award ceremonies. The same year, she returned to the small screen with romance fantasy drama Familiar Wife, taking on the role of an ordinary wife with anger management issues.

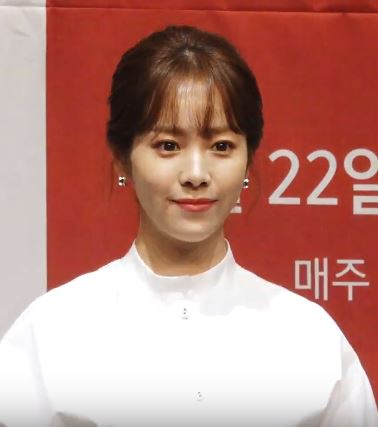
Han in May 2019

In 2019, Han starred in two television series; slice of life melodrama The Light in Your Eyes and romance melodrama One Spring Night. She then appeared in Kwak Jae-yong's romantic comedy film A Year-End Medley in 2021 and tvN television series Our Blues in 2022.

In 2023, she starred in JTBC's Behind Your Touch, playing a veterinarian who gains psychometric powers. On September 24, 2024, she was appointed 'Blue Dragon Goddess', succeeding Kim Hye-soo. She was also the master of ceremonies for the 45th Blue Dragon Film Awards, which was held on November 29, 2024.

Han starred in the drama Love Scout as Kang Ji-yoon, CEO of a successful headhunting company, which premiered on January 3, 2025. She also starred in JTBC's Heavenly Ever After as Som-yi. The following year, she starred in another JTBC series The Practical Guide to Love as Lee Ui-yeong, a hotel team manager.

In 2026, she was honored with The Hollywood Reporter’s Trailblazer Award at Busan Gala during American Film Night.

== Personal life ==
=== Relationship ===
On August 8, 2024, it was reported that after participating in KBS2's music talk show The Seasons: Choi Jung Hoon's Night Park in August 2023, Han and singer-songwriter Choi Jung-hoon stayed in contact and developed a romantic relationship. Both of their agencies confirmed that the two are dating.

=== Philanthropy and activism ===
A Social Welfare major from Seoul Women's University, Han is widely known for actively participating in volunteer work and fund drives, mostly through the relief organization Join Together Society. In 2009, she published her own book titled We're Already Friends: Han Ji-min's Philippines Donation Book, which includes stories and drawings of her time spent in a remote mountain village in the Philippines helping at a village school. She then donated all the royalties to help in funding the education of children in North Korea and developing countries in Asia. In 2012, she was designated as goodwill ambassador of the United Nations Environment Programme.

On March 8, 2022, Han donated ₩100 million to help Ukrainian victims in Russian invasion through the Korea Committee for UNICEF. On May 6, 2022, Han donated ₩50 million to the UN's international relief organization JTS (Join Together Society). On June 3, 2022, Han became a member of the 'UNICEF Honors Club'. On August 11, 2022, Han donated ₩50 million to the Handicapped Home to assist in the 2022 South Korea floods through the Seoul Community Chest of Korea (Seoul Fruit of Korea). On December 24, 2022, Han donated ₩50 million to help support heating costs for people at risk of disaster through the National Disaster Relief Association Hope Bridge. On February 9, 2023, Han donated ₩100 million to help 2023 Turkey–Syria earthquakes through UNICEF of Korea.

== Filmography ==
Key
†	Denotes films that have not yet been released

=== Film ===
Year	Title	Role	Notes	Ref.
2005	The Act 1, Chapter 2	Man (voice)	Animated short film	
2005	Blue Swallow	Lee Jung-hee		
2007	The Cut	Seon-hwa		
2011	Detective K: Secret of the Virtuous Widow	Han Gaek-ju		
2012	Ending Note		Narrator, barrier-free version	
2014	The Plan Man	Yoo So-jung		
2014	The Fatal Encounter	Queen Jung-soon		
2015	Salut d'Amour	Kim Min-jung		
2016	The Age of Shadows	Yeon Gye-soon		
2017	Relumino:Two Rays of Light	Soo-young	Short film	
2018	Keys to the Heart	Han Ga-yool		
2018	Herstory	Teacher	Cameo	
2018	Miss Baek	Baek Sang-ah		
2018	Sovereign Default		Cameo	
2020	Josée	Josée		
2021	A Year-End Medley	Park So-jin		
2027	Typhoon †	Jae-yi		

=== Television series ===
Year	Title	Role	Notes	Ref.
2003	All In	young Min Soo-yeon		
2003	Good Person	Oh Soon-jung		
2003	Jewel in the Palace	Shin-bi		
2004	Déjà vu	Soo-yeon	Drama City episode	
2005	Memory	Soo-kyung	Drama City episode	
2005	Resurrection	Seo Eun-ha	Drama City episode	
2006	Wolf	Han Ji-soo		
2006	Great Inheritance	Yoo Mi-rae		
2006	Super Rookie Ranger	Gong Joo-yeon		
2007	Capital Scandal	Na Yeo-kyung		
2007	Lee San, Wind of the Palace	Seong Song-yeon / Royal Noble Consort Ui		
2009	Cain and Abel	Oh Young-ji		
2011	Padam Padam	Jung Ji-na		
2012	Rooftop Prince	Park Ha / Hong Bu-yong		
2015	Hyde Jekyll, Me	Jang Ha-na		
2016	Don't Dare to Dream	Dr. Han Ji-min	Cameo (episode 11)	
2018	Familiar Wife	Seo Woo-jin		
2019	The Light in Your Eyes	Kim Hye-ja		
2019	One Spring Night	Lee Jung-in		
2022	Our Blues	Lee Young-ok		
2023	Behind Your Touch	Bong Ye-bun		
2025	Love Scout	Kang Ji-yoon		
2025	Heavenly Ever After	Som-yi		
2026	The Practical Guide to Love	Lee Ui-young		
TBA	The Koreans		Re-imaganing The Americans	

=== Web series ===
Year	Title	Role	Notes	Ref.
2016	Dramaworld	Herself	Cameo	
2022	Yonder	Cha Yi-hu		

=== Television shows ===
Year	Title	Role	Notes	Ref.
2006–2008	Entertainment Weekly	Host		
2021	Off the Grid	Main Cast		
2023	Whale	Host	Four-part documentary; with Park Hae-soo	
2026	Just a Friend	Cast member	with Lee Seo-jin, Joohoney, and Jeongyeon	

=== Hosting ===
Year	Title	Notes	Ref.
2018	23rd Busan International Film Festival	with Kim Nam-gil	
2024	45th Blue Dragon Film Awards	with Lee Je-hoon	

== Bibliography ==
Year	Title	Publisher
2009	We're Already Friends: Han Ji-min's Philippines Donation Book	Book Log Company

== Ambassadorship ==
- Australian Tourism Public Relations Ambassador (2022)

== Accolades ==
=== Awards and nominations ===
Name of the award ceremony, year presented, category, nominee of the award, and the result of the nomination
Award ceremony	Year	Category	Nominee / Work	Result	Ref.
APAN Star Awards	2012	Excellence Award, Actress	Padam Padam	Won	
APAN Star Awards	2022	Best Couple	Han Ji-min with Kim Woo-bin; Our Blues	Nominated	
Asian Film Critics Association Awards	2019	Best Actress	Miss Baek	Nominated	
Asian Film Awards	2019	Best Actress	Miss Baek	Nominated	
Asia Model Awards	2011	BBF Popular Star Award	Han Ji-min	Won	
Baeksang Arts Awards	2008	Best Actress – Television	Capital Scandal	Nominated	
Baeksang Arts Awards	2017	Best Supporting Actress – Film	The Age of Shadows	Nominated	
Baeksang Arts Awards	2019	Best Actress – Film	Miss Baek	Won	
Blue Dragon Film Awards	2007	Best New Actress	The Cut	Nominated	
Blue Dragon Film Awards	2018	Best Actress	Miss Baek	Won	
Buil Film Awards	2019	Best Actress	Miss Baek	Nominated	
Chunsa Film Art Awards	2019	Best Actress	Miss Baek	Nominated	
Cine21 Film Awards	2019	Best Actress	Miss Baek	Won	
Director's Cut Awards	2019	Best Actress	Miss Baek	Won	
Golden Cinema Festival	2015	Best Supporting Actress	Salut d'Amour	Won	
Golden Cinema Festival	2017	Best Supporting Actress	The Age of Shadows	Won	
Grand Bell Awards	2006	Best New Actress	Blue Swallow	Nominated	
Grand Bell Awards	2016	Best Supporting Actress	The Age of Shadows	Nominated	
Grand Bell Awards	2020	Best Actress	Miss Baek	Nominated	
KBS Drama Awards	2004	Best Actress in a One-Act/Drama Special	Déjà vu	Won	
KBS Drama Awards	2005	Best New Actress	Resurrection	Won	
KBS Drama Awards	2005	Best Couple Award	Han Ji-min with Uhm Tae-woong; Resurrection	Won	
KBS Drama Awards	2007	Excellence Award, Actress	Capital Scandal	Won	
KBS Drama Awards	2007	Netizen Award, Actress	Capital Scandal	Won	
KBS Drama Awards	2007	Best Couple Award	Han Ji-min with Kang Ji-hwan; Capital Scandal	Won	
KOFRA Film Awards	2019	Best Actress	Miss Baek	Won	
Korean Association of Film Critics Awards	2018	Best Actress	Miss Baek	Won	
Korea Drama Awards	2012	Top Excellence Award, Actress	Rooftop Prince	Won	
Korean Film Producers Association Awards	2018	Best Actress	Miss Baek	Won	
London East Asia Film Festival	2018	Best Actress	Miss Baek	Won	
Marie Claire Asia Star Awards	2018	Marie Claire Award	Miss Baek	Won	
MBC Drama Awards	2007	Excellence Award, Actress	Yi San	Won	
MBC Drama Awards	2019	Grand Prize (Daesang)	One Spring Night	Nominated	
MBC Drama Awards	2019	Top Excellence Award, Actress in a Wednesday-Thursday Miniseries	One Spring Night	Won	
Mnet 20's Choice Awards	2012	20's Female Drama Star	Rooftop Prince	Won	
SBS Drama Awards	2012	Top Excellence Award, Actress in a Drama Special	Rooftop Prince	Won	
SBS Drama Awards	2012	Top 10 Stars	Rooftop Prince	Won	
SBS Drama Awards	2012	Best Couple Award	Han Ji-min with Park Yuchun; Rooftop Prince	Won	
SBS Drama Awards	2015	Top Excellence Award, Actress in a Drama Special	Hyde Jekyll, Me	Nominated	
SBS Drama Awards	2025	Top Excellence Award, Actress in a Seasonal Drama	Love Scout	Won	
Seoul International Drama Awards	2012	Outstanding Korean Actress	Rooftop Prince	Won	
Women in Film Korea Festival	2018	Best Actress	Miss Baek	Won	

=== State and cultural honors ===
Name of country and organization, year given, and name of honor or award
Country	Organization	Year	Honor or Award	Ref.
South Korea	Financial Services Commission (Note: Honors are given at a ceremony on Finance Day which is designated on the last Tuesday of October every year. It is organized by the Financial Services Commission and is not a public holiday. Originally named Saving Day, starting in 2016, Saving Day was changed to Finance Day. The Financial Services Commission explained the reason as "a measure that reflects the trend in which people's wealth formation methods have diversified from savings to fund investments, and the role of finance has expanded.")	2023	The Prime Minister's Citation	
South Korea	Korean Popular Culture and Arts Awards (Note: Honors are given at the Korean Popular Culture and Arts Awards, arranged by the Korea Creative Content Agency and hosted by the Ministry of Culture, Sports and Tourism. They are awarded to those who have contributed to the arts and South Korea's pop culture.)	2019	Prime Minister's Commendation	
South Korea	Ministry of Health and Welfare	2009	Minister's Commendation	
South Korea	Ministry of Health and Welfare	2017	Happiness Sharing Award	
South Korea	National Tax Service (Note: Honors are given on Taxpayers' Day, organized by National Tax Service, Taxpayers' Day in Korea is March 3. An award ceremony is held annually, during which individuals and corporations receive commendation for being model taxpayers.)	2012	Presidential Commendation as Exemplary Taxpayer	

=== Listicles ===
Name of publisher, year listed, name of listicle, and placement
Publisher	Year	Listicle	Placement	Ref.
Forbes	2019	Korea Power Celebrity 40	8th	
Korean Film Council	2021	Korean Actors 200 (Note: Introduces 200 actors that best represent the present and future of Korean cinema to the people in the film industry all over the world.)	Included	
