= The Plan Man =

- Hangul: 플랜맨
- RR: Peullaenmaen
- MR: P'ŭllaenmaen
- Directed by: Seong Si-heub
- Written by: Lee Jeong-a
- Produced by: Choi Moon-su
- Starring: Jung Jae-young; Han Ji-min
- Cinematography: Park Yong-su
- Edited by: Kim Sun-min
- Music by: Kim Jun-seok
- Production company: Progress Pictures
- Distributed by: Lotte Entertainment
- Release date: January 9, 2014
- Running time: 121 minutes
- Country: South Korea
- Language: Korean

The Plan Man (Korean: 플랜맨; RR: Peullaenmaen; lit. 'Plan Man') is a 2014 South Korean romantic comedy film that tells the story of an anal retentive man who attempts to escape from his fixation of trying to plan out every detail of his life. Starring Jung Jae-young and Han Ji-min, it is the feature directorial debut of Seong Si-heub.

== Plot ==
Jung-seok is a librarian who goes about his daily life with everything planned down to the second. Having obsessive–compulsive personality disorder, he wakes up, crosses the road, visits the convenience store and goes to bed at the same time every day. Whenever he sees anything out of place, he can't help himself but to rectify it, a trait that is particularly irksome to his co-workers. Jung-seok develops a crush for a local convenience store's cashier who demonstrates a similar attention to order and cleanliness. When he finally works up the courage to tell her his feelings, he bumps into So-jung instead, a messy musician and free spirit whose life is lived spontaneously, adventurously and impulsively. With So-jung's help, he tries to woo his dream girl, but the only catch is that she wants someone who doesn't share her obsession for neatness. So now Jung-seok must break his routine and place himself outside of his comfort zone, as So-jung asks him to enter a singing audition program together with her.

== Cast ==
- Jung Jae-young as Han Jung-seok
- Han Ji-min as Yoo So-jung
- Cha Ye-ryun as Lee Ji-won
- Jang Gwang as Goo Sang-yoon
- Kim Ji-young as Psychiatrist
- Joo Jin-mo as Laundry
- Choi Won-young as Kang Byung-soo
- Yoo Seung-mok as Writer Lee
- Jo Yong-jin as young Jung-seok
- Go Seo-hee as Jung-seok's mother
- Park Gil-soo as Section chief Nam
- Park Jin-joo as Eun-ha
- Park Jin-woo as Sang-hoon
- So Hee-jung as Kyung-mi
- Lee Han-na as High school girl
- Ha Jae-sook as Lethargic woman
- Kim Ji-hoon as Big man
- Sung Byung-sook as Mi-young
- Lee Ye-eun as Min-ji
- Jung Young-gi as Manager
- Sung Gi-wook as PD Seo
