= Lee Se-na =

South Korean actress (born 1982)

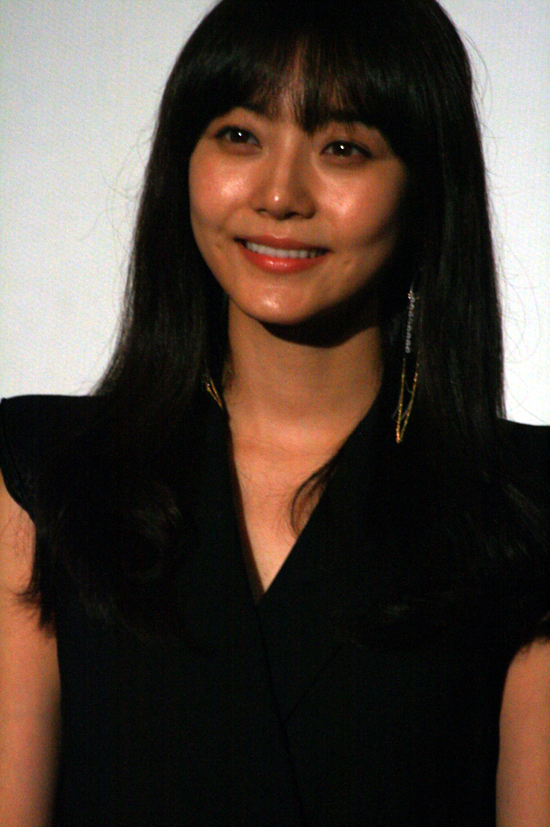
- Lee in 2009
- Born: March 16, 1982 (age 44); Seoul, South Korea
- Occupation: Actress
- Years active: 2002–present

Korean name
- Hangul: 이세나
- Hanja: 李世娜
- RR: I Sena
- MR: I Sena

Lee Se-na (Korean: 이세나; born March 16, 1982) is a South Korean actress.

== Career ==
External videos
- "Pottery Girl" UCC Video 1 (도자기녀 UCC 동영상 1편) on YouTube
- "Pottery Girl" UCC Video 2 (도자기녀 UCC 동영상 2편) on YouTube

She graduated from Yeoju Institute of Technology with a bachelor's degree in pottery and film studies from Dongguk University. She debuted in 2007 through an Anycall television commercial for Samsung Electronics. In 2007, a user-generated content video clip titled "Pottery Girl" (도자기녀) made headlines about his girlfriend making pottery for her boyfriend ahead of Valentine's Day.

== Filmography ==
=== Television series ===
Year	Title	Role	Notes/Ref.
2008	Elephant		
2008	Life Special Investigation Team		
2008	Korean Lawyer	Choi Go-soo's Secretary	
2008	Glass Castle	Song So-hyun	
2009	Hometown Legends: "Banned Books"	Hye-myeong	
2010	Scarlet Letter	Han In-seo	
2011	Deep Rooted Tree	Geun-ji	
2012	Dummy Mommy	Kim Soo-ri	
2012	Still You	Na Se-hee	
2015	Hyde Jekyll, Me	Choi Seo-hee	
2016	Six Flying Dragons	Geun-ji	
2018	It's My Life	Kim Ha-na	
2018	Angel's Last Mission: Love	Yeon-seo's mother	Special appearances
2020	Cheat on Me If You Can	Min Yoon-hui	
2021	Lost	Ji-na	
2022	Eve	Yoon Soo-jung	

=== Film ===
Year	Title	Role	Notes
2009	Handphone	Yoon Jin-ah	
2009	City of Fathers	Soon-ae	
2016	The Last Princess	Seo Kyung-shin	
2016	Road Kill	Min-cheol's wife	Short film
2018	Gate	Head of the costume department	
