= Kwak Jung-wook =

South Korean actor (born 1990)

- Born: 12 June 1990 (age 36); South Korea
- Education: Sungkyunkwan University
- Occupation: Actor
- Spouse: Park Se-young (m. 2022)
- Children: 1

Korean name
- Hangul: 곽정욱
- Hanja: 郭正旭
- RR: Gwak Jeonguk
- MR: Kwak Chŏnguk

Kwak Jung-wook (Korean: 곽정욱; born 12 June 1990) is a South Korean actor.

== Personal life ==
On 24 January 2022, it was confirmed that Kwak and Park Se-young were getting married in mid-February, and the wedding ceremony would be held privately in Seoul. They had first become acquainted with one another after starring in School 2013. On 7 January 2025, it was confirmed that the couple is expecting their first child. The couple welcomed a daughter on 13 May 2025.

== Filmography ==
=== Television series ===
Year	Title	Role	Notes/Ref.
1998	White Nights 3.98	Lee Min-ki	
1999	Hur Jun	young Kim Sang-hwa	
1999	Sweet Bride		
2000–2002	Fairy Comey	Commander Bug, Kang Do-ri	
2001	Empress Myeongseong		
2002	Rustic Period		
2002	Royal Story: Jang Hui-bin	young Crown Prince Lee Gyun	
2003	Go Mom Go!		
2003	Drama City "I Want To Go Home"		
2003	Drama City "Photographer Hong Bong Goo"		
2004	The Age of Heroes	young Park Choon-sam	
2004	Immortal Admiral Yi Sun-sin		
2004	Toji, the Land	Kang Doo-me	
2005	Resurrection	teenage Seo Ha-eun	
2006	Hwarang Fighter Maru	Lee Ki-jung	
2007	Lucifer	young Jung Tae-seung	
2009	Queen Seondeok	young Bojong	
2011	Drama Special Series "White Christmas"	Yang Kang-mo	
2011	Dear My Sister	young Ji Young-pyo	
2012	Flower Band	Jung Maro	
2012	School 2013	Oh Jung-ho	
2013	Drama Special Series "Puberty Medley"	Im Deok-won	
2013	The Blade and Petal	Chi-woon	
2014	God's Gift: 14 Days	Han Ki-tae	Cameo (episodes 5–6)
2014	KBS Drama Special "Pitch Black"	Han Jung-wook	
2018	Life on Mars	Officer Lee Soon-ho / Kim Hyun-seok (1988 - serial killer)	

=== Film ===
Year	Title	Role
2002	Lovers' Concerto	young Lee Ji-hwan
2011	My Way	Min-woo
2014	Mourning Grave	Lee Ki-tae

== Awards and nominations ==
Year	Award	Category	Nominated work	Result
2002	SBS Drama Awards	Best Young Actor	Rustic Period	Won
