= Sunny (2008 film) =

2008 film directed by Lee Joon-ik

- Theatrical release poster
- Hangul: 님은 먼곳에
- RR: Nimeun meongose
- MR: Nimŭn mŏn'gose
- Directed by: Lee Joon-ik
- Written by: Choi Seok-hwan
- Produced by: Jung Seung-hye; Cho Chul-hyun
- Starring: Soo Ae; Jung Jin-young; Jung Kyung-ho; Joo Jin-mo; Uhm Tae-woong
- Cinematography: Na Seung-yong
- Edited by: Kim Sang-bum; Kim Jae-bum
- Music by: Lee Byung-hoon; Bang Jun-seok
- Distributed by: Showbox/Mediaplex
- Release date: June 23, 2008
- Running time: 126 minutes
- Country: South Korea
- Language: Korean
- Box office: US$11.1 million

Sunny (Korean: 님은 먼곳에; RR: Nimeun meongose; lit. 'My Dear is Far Away') is a 2008 South Korean musical drama film directed by Lee Joon-ik. Soo Ae plays the titular Soon-yi, whose husband enlists to fight in the Vietnam War, and she decides to join a singing group that will travel to Vietnam to perform for the soldiers there.

== Plot ==
Soon-yi is a young woman stuck in an arranged marriage to a man who still loves his college girlfriend. Her husband, Sang-gil, is a soldier in the South Korean army, and though she visits him regularly, he does not return her affections. After Sang-gil is sent to fight in the Vietnam War, Soon-yi resolves to follow him. She joins a band which is heading there, where she sings for the soldiers as "Sunny", with the hope of being reunited with her husband.

== Cast ==
- Soo Ae as Soon-yi / Sunny
- Jung Jin-young as Kim Jeong-man, band leader
- Jung Kyung-ho as Yong-deuk, bassist
- Joo Jin-mo as Seong-chan, guitarist
- Shin Hyeon-tak as Cheol-sik, drummer
- Uhm Tae-woong as Park Sang-gil, Sunny's husband
- Park Yoon-ho as Private Kim
- Lee Joo-sil as Mother-in-law
- Jo Mi-ryung as Jeni
- Shin Jung-geun as Battalion commander
- Fredrik Skalin as Soldier

== Production ==
Sunny was produced on a budget of ₩7.1 billion (US$7 million). Director Lee Joon-ik made the protagonist female in response to criticism that his films were largely male-oriented. Lee cast Soo Ae in the lead role, saying, "No other actress in [South] Korea has the distinctively pure image that [she] has". Soo Ae did two months of training to refine her singing and dancing skills, and admitted to being concerned over whether or not she could pull off the character.

== Release ==
Sunny was released in South Korea on July 23, 2008. On its opening weekend it was ranked second at the box office with 480,144 admissions, and exceeded the one million mark on July 19. As of August 31, Sunny had received a total of 1,804,223 admissions nationwide, and as of September 14 had grossed a total of US$11,093,277.

== Awards and nominations ==
Year	Award	Category	Recipient	Result	Ref.
2008	4th Premiere Rising Star Awards Summit (PIFF)	Best Actress	Soo Ae	Won	
2008	4th Premiere Rising Star Awards Summit (PIFF)	Best New Actor	Jung Kyung-ho	Won	
2008	17th Buil Film Awards	Best Film	Sunny	Nominated	
2008	17th Buil Film Awards	Best Actress	Soo Ae	Won	
2008	17th Buil Film Awards	Best Lighting	Park Se-mun	Nominated	
2008	17th Buil Film Awards	Best Music	Lee Byung-hoon, Bang Jun-seok	Won	
2008	17th Buil Film Awards	Technical Award	Hong Jang-pyo (Special Effects)	Nominated	
2008	17th Buil Film Awards	Buil Readers' Jury Award	Sunny	Nominated	
2008	28th Korean Association of Film Critics Awards	Best Actress	Soo Ae	Won	
2008	28th Arts Council Korea	Artist of the Year, Film category	Soo Ae	Won	
2008	31st Golden Cinematography Awards	Popularity Award	Soo Ae	Won	
2008	31st Golden Cinematography Awards	Popularity Award	Jung Jin-young	Won	
2008	29th Blue Dragon Film Awards	Best Actress	Soo Ae	Nominated	
2008	29th Blue Dragon Film Awards	Best Supporting Actor	Jung Kyung-ho	Nominated	
2008	29th Blue Dragon Film Awards	Best Art Direction	Kang Seung-yong	Nominated	
2008	29th Blue Dragon Film Awards	Best Music	Lee Byung-hoon, Bang Jun-seok	Won	
2009	45th Baeksang Arts Awards	Best Director	Lee Joon-ik	Nominated	
2009	45th Baeksang Arts Awards	Best Actress	Soo Ae	Nominated	
2009	46th Grand Bell Awards	Best Actress	Soo Ae	Won	
2009	46th Grand Bell Awards	Best Supporting Actor	Jung Kyung-ho	Nominated	
2009	46th Grand Bell Awards	Best Costume Design	Shim Hyun-sub	Nominated	
2009	17th Korean Culture and Entertainment Awards	Best Actress	Soo Ae	Won	
