= Lucifer (South Korean TV series) =

2007 South Korean television series

- Promotional poster
- Hangul: 마왕
- Hanja: 魔王
- Lit.: Devil
- RR: Mawang
- MR: Mawang
- Genre: Drama; Mystery; Romance
- Written by: Kim Ji-woo
- Directed by: Park Chan-hong
- Starring: Uhm Tae-woong; Shin Min-a; Ju Ji-hoon
- Music by: Park Hye-ji; Yoo Hye-joon; Seo Min-young; Eom Ki-yeop
- Country of origin: South Korea
- Original language: Korean
- No. of episodes: 20

Production
- Executive producer: Lee Deok-geon
- Running time: 70 minutes
- Production company: Olive 9

Original release
- Network: KBS2
- Release: 21 March – 24 May 2007

Related
- Maō

Lucifer (Korean: 마왕; RR: Mawang) is a 2007 South Korean television series starring Uhm Tae-woong, Shin Min-a, and Ju Ji-hoon. It aired on KBS2 from March 21 to May 24, 2007 on Wednesdays and Thursdays at 21:55 for 20 episodes.

The series is the second installment of the revenge trilogy by director Park Chan-hong and writer Kim Ji-woo, after Resurrection in 2005 and followed by Don't Look Back: The Legend of Orpheus in 2013.

== Plot ==
A string of murders brings together a conflicted detective, a psychic librarian, and a mysterious lawyer with dubious motives. Detective Kang Oh-soo (Uhm Tae-woong) is assigned to two seemingly unrelated murder cases, where the only clues left behind are tarot cards, with the first card meaning "judgment." This leads him to Seo Hae-in (Shin Min-a), a quiet librarian who has the uncanny ability to make a psychic connection to an object to discover its history. She reveals to him that the victims were connected to the death of a high school boy years ago. The one common link between the suspects is their defense attorney, Oh Seung-ha (Ju Ji-hoon), a young lawyer who is seemingly kind and altruistic. Hae-in and Seung-ha later fall in love, though Oh-soo also has feelings for her.

As the culprit continues to leave clues, more lives are ruined and the body count rises. Oh-soo races to uncover the truth, but he is also haunted by the sins of his past which he has been trying to atone for. An incident in his youth 12 years ago has snowballed into a larger tragedy, and the two men involved are destined to face each other again, unsure who is good and who is evil.

== Cast ==
=== Main ===
- Uhm Tae-woong as Kang Oh-soo
  - Seo Jun-young as young Oh-soo

A 29-years old detective who works in the violent crimes division. He is energetic, brave, relentless in his duties, and a straight talker. Oh-soo comes from a rich family and is the second son of a famous politician. During his middle school years, he was considered a troublemaker and a bully. At 17, he stabbed a fellow student to death during an argument. To atone, he turned away from his dark past.

- Shin Min-a as Seo Hae-in
  - Ko Joo-yeon as young Hae-in

A 24-years old librarian who possesses an ability for psychometry and is knowledgeable about tarot cards. Bright and optimistic, she lives with her widowed mother, who is deaf and mute. Hae-in learned about her supernatural ability when she was 12 years old.

- Ju Ji-hoon as Oh Seung-ha/Jung Tae-sung
  - Kwak Jung-wook as young Tae-seung

A 28-years old public defender. Known for his kindness, Seung-ha frequently volunteers at a soup kitchen, and always listens intently to his client's problems and suggests solutions. 12 years ago, his life changed after the death of his older brother, followed shortly by his mother's death due to shock and grief. He disappeared after graduating from middle school, and resurfaces as a lawyer. While hiding his real identity, he meticulously prepares for revenge.

=== Supporting ===
Kang Oh-soo's family

- Jung Dong-hwan as Kang Dong-hyun, Oh-soo's father
- Choi Deok-moon as Kang Hee-soo, Oh-soo's older brother
- Yoon Hye-kyung as Choi Na-hee, Hee-soo's wife

Kang Oh-soo's friends

- Kim Young-jae as Na Seok-jin, Hee-soo's assistant and Na-hee's lover
- Han Jung-soo as Yoon Dae-shik, private money lender
- Oh Yong as Kim Soon-ki, ex-prison inmate

Police detectives

- Joo Jin-mo as Ban Chang-ho, chief detective
- Greena Park as Lee Min-jae
- Kim Young-joon as Shin Jae-min

Supporting cast

- Jo Jae-wan as Kim Young-chul
- Lee Bo-hee as Yeo Soon-ok, Hae-in's mother
- Lee Eun as Gong Joo-hee, Hae-in's best friend
- Kim Kyu-chul as Cha Gwang-doo, lawyer and former detective
- Im Seung-dae as Hwang Soo-geon
- Park Kwang-jung as Mo In-ho
- Yoo Yeon-soo as Jo Dong-seob
- Kim Kyung-ik as Sung Joon-pyo, reporter

Extended cast

- Lee Min-hee as lost girl
- Lee Do-ryun as Gwan Hyun-tae
- Jeon Ye-seo as Oh Seung-hee, Seung-ha's sister
- Park Chul-ho as Jung Tae-hoon, Tae-seung's older brother
- Choi Jae-hwan
- Lee Sung-min as Hwang Dae-pil
- Kim Min-kyu
- Oh Hyun-chul
- Park Young-seo as the real Oh Seung-ha

== Ratings ==
Ratings
Date	Episode	Nationwide
2007-03-21	1	9.3%
2007-03-22	2	8.7%
2007-03-28	3	7.9%
2007-03-29	4	6.9%
2007-04-04	5	8.4%
2007-04-05	6	7.7%
2007-04-11	7	7.1%
2007-04-12	8	6.9%
2007-04-18	9	7.4%
2007-04-19	10	6.4%
2007-04-25	11	6.5%
2007-04-26	12	7.0%
2007-05-02	13	6.2%
2007-05-03	14	7.4%
2007-05-09	15	6.4%
2007-05-10	16	6.9%
2007-05-16	17	7.3%
2007-05-17	18	8.4%
2007-05-23	19	7.0%
2007-05-24	20	8.3%
Average		7.4%

== Awards and nominations ==
Year	Award	Category	Recipient	Result
2007	KBS Drama Awards	Excellence Award, Actor in a Miniseries	Uhm Tae-woong	Nominated
2007	KBS Drama Awards	Excellence Award, Actor in a Miniseries	Ju Ji-hoon	Nominated
2007	KBS Drama Awards	Excellence Award, Actress in a Miniseries	Shin Min-a	Nominated

== Remake ==
Lucifer became very popular in Japan when it aired on cable channel So-net in October 2007. This led to the production of a Japanese remake in 2008 titled Maō, starring Satoshi Ohno, Toma Ikuta, and Ryoko Kobayashi.
