= Joo Jin-mo (actor, born 1958) =

South Korean actor

- Born: February 26, 1958 (age 68); Seoul, South Korea
- Occupation: Actor
- Agent(s): Hodu & U Entertainment
- Spouse: Ahn Bong-hee (died 2023)

Korean name
- Hangul: 주진모
- Hanja: 朱鎭模
- RR: Ju Jinmo
- MR: Chu Chinmo

Joo Jin-mo (born February 26, 1958) is a South Korean actor.

== Career ==
In 2026, Lee had a supporting role in the fantasy romantic-comedy No Tail to Tell which aired on SBS. He played Pagun who is a deity opposite Kim Hye-yoon and Lomon.

== Personal life ==
On April 9, 2023, the agency announced that Joo's wife, the late Ahn Bong-hee, died on the same day due to chronic illness.

== Filmography ==
=== Film ===
Year	Title	Role
1996	Farewell My Darling	
1997	Father vs. Son	
2001	Waikiki Brothers	Man selling items at rest area
2003	If You Were Me	
2004	The Big Swindle	
2004	The President's Barber	Chief police at police substation
2004	My Mother, the Mermaid	Resident
2004	To Catch a Virgin Ghost	Ban-do
2004	3-Iron	Detective Jo
2004	A Starving Day (short film)	
2005	Interview (short film)	
2006	Family Ties	Woon-shik
2006	The Bad Utterances	
2006	Tazza: The High Rollers	Jjakgwi
2006	Righteous Ties	Jang Nak-young
2006	Cruel Winter Blues	Lead detective
2007	A Shark	Middle-aged gambler
2007	The Happy Life	Ki-young's senior
2007	Going by the Book	Bank branch manager
2008	Sunny	Seong-chan
2008	Sa-kwa	Hyun-jung's father
2009	Handphone	Captain Kim
2009	Hello, Stranger	Driver Park
2009	Running Turtle	Team leader Yang
2009	Good Morning President	Chief of Secret Service
2009	Heaven's Postman	Yoon Jeon-soo
2009	Jeon Woo-chi: The Taoist Wizard	Shaman
2010	Troubleshooter	Won Joo-bong
2011	Heartbeat	Company president Kang
2011	Children	Director Ahn
2011	Officer of the Year	Jo Joon-goo (cameo)
2011	Head	Chief Lee
2011	Quick	Team leader Kim
2011	The Client	Judge
2011	Mr. Idol	Lee Yoo-jin's father
2012	The Thieves	Detective
2013	South Bound	Public Security Bureau 1
2013	New World	Police commissioner Ko
2013	Happiness for Sale	Kang Bong-geun
2013	Steal My Heart	Chief detective
2014	The Plan Man	Laundry
2014	Kundo: Age of the Rampant	Song Young-gil
2015	Chronicle of a Blood Merchant	Heo Sam-gwan's uncle
2016	A Violent Prosecutor	Judge Choi
2016	Pandora	Minister
2017	The Sheriff in Town	Ship Captain Park (special appearance)
2017	The King's Case Note	Jik Je-hak
2017	V.I.P.	National Intelligence Service high rank executive
2019	Long Live The King	So-pal
2020	Collectors	Man-gi

=== Television series ===
Year	Title	Role
2005	Resurrection	Park Sang-chul
2006	Goodbye Solo	Yoo Ji-an's father
2007	Lucifer	Ban Chang-ho
2009	Hero	Gong Chil-sung
2010	Bad Guy	
2011	Romance Town	Noh Sang-hoon
2011	Can't Lose	Kang Woo-shik
2012	Operation Proposal	Ham Sung-hoon
2012	The King's Doctor	Sa-am
2012	KBS Drama Special – "Sangkwoni (Business District)"	Young-chul
2013	Iris II: New Generation	Detective
2013	Don't Look Back: The Legend of Orpheus	The old Korean man in Okinawa
2013	The Blade and Petal	Yang Moon
2014	God's Gift: 14 Days	Lee Myeong-han
2014	A Witch's Love	Kwon Hyun-seob
2014	Temptation	Choi Seok-gi
2014	The King's Face	Jeong Cheol
2015	Mask	Professor Kim
2015	Cheo Yong 2	Kang Gi-young
2016	Flowers of the Prison	Tojeong Lee Ji-ham
2016	Something About 1%	Lee Gyu-chul
2017	The Universe's Star	Manager Ko
2017	Manhole	Bong Dal
2017	Bad Guys 2	Lee Myeong-deuk
2018	Partners for Justice	Park Joong-ho
2019	My Lawyer, Mr. Jo 2: Crime and Punishment	Yoon Jeong-gun
2021	Now, We Are Breaking Up	Representative Hwang
2022	Woori the Virgin	Kim Deok-bae
2024	Uncle Samsik	Ahn Yo-seop
2026	No Tail to Tell	Pagun
