= Frog Boys =

Five South Korean murder victims

Phone card with the photos, names, and ages of the Frog Boys used to raise awareness and help find them. The boys are listed as one year older due to Korean age reckoning.

The Frog Boys (Korean: 개구리소년, Gaegurisonyeon) were a group of five boys who were murdered while trying to catch frog eggs in Daegu (대구). The incident attracted national attention, leading to a massive manhunt and extensive media coverage. The case remains one of South Korea's most infamous unsolved crimes. On the morning of 26 March 1991, five boys—Kim Jong-sik (aged 11), Jo Ho-yeon (12), Kim Yeong-gyu (11), Park Chan-in (10), and Woo Cheol-won (14)—left their homes in the Dalseo District of Daegu, South Korea. The group set out to search for frog eggs near Mount Waryong, a hill close to their neighborhood. Frog egg hunting was a common springtime activity among children in the area, and the boys told their parents they would return soon.

When the boys failed to return home, their families reported them missing. What followed was one of the largest search efforts in South Korean history, involving police, military personnel, and civilian volunteers. Despite extensive efforts, no trace of the boys was found for more than a decade.

On 26 September 2002, over 11 years after their disappearance, the remains of all five boys were discovered on Mount Waryong by two men scavenging for acorns. The site was reportedly within an area that had been previously searched. Initially believed to have died from exposure, further investigation revealed evidence suggesting foul play.

Forensic analysis indicated that some of the boys had suffered blunt force trauma to the skull. Items such as rusted bullets and other metal objects were found near the bodies. The condition of the remains and their positioning led investigators to conclude that the boys had likely been murdered and deliberately buried.

Despite renewed efforts following the discovery, the case remains officially unsolved. Several theories have emerged over the years, including military involvement, with speculation that the boys may have been accidentally killed during training exercises and that their deaths were subsequently covered up. Others believe a local individual or individuals may have lured the boys and murdered them for unknown reasons. Psychological profilers have suggested the perpetrator might have been someone who knew the boys or the local terrain well. The investigation was hampered by the degradation of evidence over time and procedural issues during the initial search.

The Frog Boys case had a significant impact on South Korean society. It highlighted the need for improved child safety protocols and contributed to changes in law enforcement procedures for missing persons. The boys' families were instrumental in keeping the case in the public eye, advocating for continued investigation and accountability.

In 2006, the South Korean statute of limitations for murder was 15 years. As the crime had occurred in 1991, the legal window for prosecution closed in 2006. However, public pressure eventually led to the abolition of the statute of limitations for murder in 2015, largely due to high-profile cold cases such as this.

The story of the Frog Boys has been the subject of documentaries, books, and dramatizations in South Korean media. It remains a poignant reminder of the importance of justice, transparency, and child protection.

== Victims ==
The Frog Boys were aged between 9 and 13 years old:

- Woo Cheol-won (13)
- Jo Ho-yeon (12)
- Kim Yeong-gyu (11)
- Park Chan-in (10)
- Kim Jong-sik (9)

== Circumstances and disappearance ==
26 March 1991, was a public holiday in South Korea, as it marked the first local elections held since the fall of the country's military dictatorship in December 1987. The five boys decided to spend the day searching for frog eggs in the streams of Mount Waryong (35.867°N 128.513°E), on the western outskirts of Daegu. The boys never returned home, and after they were reported missing, their story made national headlines. South Korean President Roh Tae-woo sent 300,000 police and military troops to search for the boys, with the searches shown on live television. All five of the boys' fathers quit their jobs to look for their children around the country. Mount Waryong was searched over 500 times.

== Discovery of bodies ==
On 26 September 2002, two men searching for acorns discovered the bodies of the boys on Mount Waryong, in an area that had been previously searched. They first reported the remains via an anonymous phone call. Police initially stated that the boys had died of hypothermia. However, their parents rejected that conclusion and demanded a full investigation, pointing out that of one of the boy's clothes had been found tied in knots and unused bullets were found in his clothes, as well as the fact that their bodies were discovered a short distance from a nearby village the boys knew well. Forensic experts found that the skulls of three of the children showed blunt-force trauma, possibly from metal farming tools. Police then stated the children could have been killed by someone who "may have flown into a rage."

== Aftermath ==
In 2006, the statute of limitations expired on the case. However, in 2015, the National Assembly voted to remove the statute of limitations on first-degree murder, opening the possibility of criminal charges if a suspect is found. On the thirtieth anniversary of their disappearance, the city of Daegu installed a memorial monument near the location called the "Frog Boy Memorial and Children's Safety Prayer Monument" (Korean: 개구리소년 추모 및 어린이 안전 기원비). The Daegu police also announced a new task force to review the case from the beginning and follow-up on any new information they receive.

== Popular culture ==
The Frog Boys incident has been the subject of two films: Come Back, Frog Boys (1992) and Children (2011). Several songs also refer to the case as well as the documentary In Search of the Frog Boys (2019), by Singapore broadcaster Channel News Asia .

== See also ==
- List of solved missing person cases: 1950–1999
- List of unsolved murders (1980–1999)
