= List of 2018 box office number-one films in South Korea =

The following is a list of 2018 box office number-one films in South Korea. When the number-one film in gross is not the same as the number-one film in admissions, both are listed.

== Number-one films ==
†	This implies the highest-grossing movie of the year.

#	Date	Film	Gross	Notes
1	January 7, 2018	Along with the Gods: The Two Worlds	US$10.4 million	#1 spot for 3 consecutive weeks
2	January 14, 2018	1987: When the Day Comes	US$8.2 million	Claimed the #1 spot on its third week of release
3	January 21, 2018	Maze Runner: The Death Cure	US$7.0 million	Beat new releases Keys to the Heart and Coco
4	January 28, 2018	Keys to the Heart	US$5.4 million	With positive reviews from audiences, the film rise to the #1 spot on its second week of release
5	February 4, 2018	Psychokinesis	US$3.6 million	
6	February 11, 2018	Detective K: Secret of the Living Dead	US$7.3 million	Dominated the weekend box office with 48% revenue share
7	February 18, 2018	Black Panther	US$15.8 million	Dominated the weekend box office with 51% revenue share; Beat Detective K: Secret of the Living Dead and new release Golden Slumber
8	February 25, 2018	Black Panther	US$5.7 million	First 2018 release to have topped the box office for 2 consecutive weeks
9	March 4, 2018	The Princess and the Matchmaker	US$3.8 million	
10	March 11, 2018	The Vanished	US$4.1 million	
11	March 18, 2018	Be with You	US$5.4 million	Dominated the weekend box office with 45% revenue share
12	March 25, 2018	Pacific Rim Uprising	US$5.2 million	
13	April 1, 2018	Gonjiam: Haunted Asylum	US$7.6 million	Beat Ready Player One, and became the first Korean horror film to topped the weekend box office since The Wailing in 2016
14	April 8, 2018	Gonjiam: Haunted Asylum	US$3.9 million	The film topped Box Office by admissions with 513,648 attendance.
14	April 8, 2018	Ready Player One	US$4.0 million	The film topped Box Office by gross with US$50,800 higher gross than Gonjiam: Haunted Asylum
15	April 15, 2018	Rampage	US$5.0 million	
16	April 22, 2018	Rampage	US$3.1 million	
17	April 29, 2018	Avengers: Infinity War	US$27.7 million	Highest-grossing film in South Korea's all-time weekend box office (second by admissions); Dominated weekend box office with 95% revenue share; Became fastest film to reach 4 million admissions in South Korea's cinema history, and also the first film to reach 1.3 million admissions in a single day screening
18	May 6, 2018	Avengers: Infinity War	US$17.1 million	Dominated weekend box office with 75% revenue share
19	May 13, 2018	Avengers: Infinity War	US$7.0 million	Fastest foreign film to reach 10 million admissions in South Korea.; Dominated box office with 57% revenue share; Became first 2018 release to have topped the weekend box office for 3 consecutive weeks
20	May 20, 2018	Deadpool 2	US$11.8 million	Dominated the weekend box office with 64% revenue share; First R-rated film to top the box office in South Korea in 2018
21	May 27, 2018	Believer	US$9.2 million	Dominated weekend box office with 54% revenue share; Fastest domestic film to reach 1 million admissions in 2018 (to date).
22	June 3, 2018	Believer	US$8.2 million	Dominated weekend box office with 63% revenue share; Fastest domestic film to reach 3 million admissions in 2018 (to date).
23	June 10, 2018	Jurassic World: Fallen Kingdom	US$14.8 million	Set new record as biggest opening day for a foreign film in South Korea with US$9.1 million gross and 1.18 million admissions; Dominated weekend box office with 72% revenue share
24	June 17, 2018	The Accidental Detective 2: In Action	US$5.5 million	
25	June 24, 2018	The Accidental Detective 2: In Action	US$5.0 million	
26	July 1, 2018	The Witch: Part 1. The Subversion	US$6.0 million	
27	July 8, 2018	Ant-Man and the Wasp	US$15.5 million	Dominated weekend box office with 69% revenue share
28	July 15, 2018	Ant-Man and the Wasp	US$8.3 million	Marvel Cinematic Universe's films totaled 100 million admissions in South Korean with this film.
29	July 22, 2018	Incredibles 2	US$8.6 million	Dominated weekend box office with 47% revenue share; Became first animated feature film to topped weekend box office in South Korea, since Your Name in January 2017; Highest opening gross for a Pixar film in South Korea, beating previous record set by Toy Story 3
30	July 29, 2018	Mission: Impossible – Fallout	US$18.7 million	Dominated weekend box office with 66% revenue share; Biggest opening day in July for a foreign film in South Korea with US$3.5 million gross; Highest opening weekend gross in the Mission: Impossible film series
31	August 5, 2018	Along with the Gods: The Last 49 Days †	US$29.8 million	Dominated weekend box office with 71% revenue share. Set various records during its opening weekend in South Korea: Set a new record for the biggest opening day by admissions with 1.25 million admissions, beating the record set by Jurassic World: Fallen Kingdom (1.18 million admissions); Set a new record for the biggest single day screening in both gross and admission (1.46 million admission with US$11.8 million gross on its fourth day of release (August 4, 2018). Beat the record set by Avengers: Infinity War (1.33 million admissions and US$11.4 million gross); Set a new record for becoming the fastest film to reach 3 (3 days), 5 and 6 (5 days) million admissions, beating previous record set by Train to Busan in 2016; Set a new record for all-time biggest opening weekend both in gross and admission, with US$29.8 million gross. Became first film in South Korea to reach 6 million admissions during its opening week (Wednesday to Sunday). Beating Train to Busan in 2016 (5.31 million admissions).
32	August 12, 2018	Along with the Gods: The Last 49 Days †	US$12.2 million	Set a new record for becoming the fastest film to reach 7, 8, and 9 million admissions in South Korea; Suffer 58% drop on its second weekend, due to competitive debut weekend for The Spy Gone North
33	August 19, 2018	The Witness	US$6.4 million	Face competitive weekend with The Spy Gone North, which grossing around US$6.3 million
34	August 26, 2018	On Your Wedding Day	US$5.5 million	Dominated 30% of revenue share, while total 75% of revenue share dominated by domestic films. Local films take top four spots at weekend Box Office, for the first time since August last year in the same week (34th week)
35	September 2, 2018	On Your Wedding Day	US$4.5 million	Become first domestic romance film to have topped Box Office for 2 consecutive weeks, since Time Renegades in 2016. Also first romantic comedy film to have done so, since My Love, My Bride in 2014
36	September 9, 2018	Searching	US$5.8 million	Dominated weekend box office with 50% revenue share; Increased 62% in gross compared to its debut weekend, biggest second weekend increase for a foreign film that topped box office in South Korea, beat previous record (+18.9%) set by Frozen in 2014; First foreign thriller film to topped box office since Gone Girl in 2014
37	September 16, 2018	Searching	US$4.1 million	First foreign thriller film to have topped box office for 2 consecutive weeks, since Gone Girl in 2014; Managed to lead the box office despite the period blockbuster Monstrum and American sci-fi action The Predator debut on the same weekend
38	September 23, 2018	The Great Battle	US$9.0 million	Dominated 42% of revenue share despite a competitive weekend with Fengshui, The Negotiation, and The Nun debut on the same weekend
39	September 30, 2018	The Great Battle	US$6.5 million	Dominated 43% of revenue share, local films are taking the top four spots at weekend box office; Becoming fastest Chuseok Holiday film to surpassed 3 million admissions, beat previous record set by Masquerade in 2012
40	October 7, 2018	Venom	US$9.3 million	Dominated 44% of revenue share, head-to-head with Dark Figure of Crime which released on the same day (grossed US$7.9 million with 38% revenue share); Biggest opening day for Marvel Character solo film in South Korea all-time; Fourth biggest opening day for a foreign film in South Korea all-time
41	October 14, 2018	Dark Figure of Crime	US$4.4 million	Rose to first place during its second weekend, though having 44% drop in gross compared to its debut weekend; Along with Venom (grossed US$3.9 million), the two films together accounted 70% of revenue share.
42	October 21, 2018	First Man	US$2.9 million	Dominated 29% of revenue share, head-to-head with Dark Figure of Crime which grossed US$2.5 million with 25% revenue share; Lowest attendance for film that topped box office this year (349,875 attendance from 3 days weekend)
43	October 28, 2018	Rampant	US$6.6 million	Dominated box office with 52% revenue share
44	November 4, 2018	Intimate Strangers	US$9.3 million	Dominated box office with 52% revenue share; Highest opening day and debut weekend for a domestic comedy film since Luck Key in 2016; Fastest comedy film to surpassed 1 million admissions this year
45	November 11, 2018	Intimate Strangers	US$7.9 million	
46	November 18, 2018	Fantastic Beasts: The Crimes of Grindelwald	US$8.2 million	
47	November 25, 2018	Bohemian Rhapsody	US$7.7 million	
48	December 2, 2018	Default	US$8.4 million	
49	December 9, 2018	Default	US$5.0 million	
50	December 16, 2018	Bohemian Rhapsody	US$4.4 million	
51	December 23, 2018	Aquaman	US$7.9 million	
52	December 30, 2018	Aquaman	US$6.6 million	

== Highest-grossing films ==
Highest-grossing domestic films of 2018 (by admissions)*
Rank	Title	Release date	Admissions	Domestic gross
1	Along with the Gods: The Last 49 Days	August 1, 2018	12,274,996	US$91.2 million
2	Along with the Gods: The Two Worlds	December 20, 2017	5,872,007	US$42.1 million
3	The Great Battle	September 19, 2018	5,440,186	US$41.2 million
4	Intimate Strangers	October 31, 2018	5,293,435	US$39.4 million
5	1987: When the Day Comes	December 27, 2017	5,290,310	US$38.1 million
6	Believer	May 22, 2018	5,063,684	US$38.6 million
7	The Spy Gone North	August 8, 2018	4,974,520	US$38.0 million
8	Dark Figure of Crime	October 3, 2018	3,789,321	US$29.3 million
9	Default	November 28, 2018	3,747,954	US$27.4 million
10	Keys to the Heart	January 17, 2018	3,419,339	US$24.4 million

Highest-grossing foreign films of 2018 (by admissions)*
Rank	Title	Release date	Admissions	Domestic gross
1	Avengers: Infinity War	April 25, 2018	11,212,710	US$88.8 million
2	Bohemian Rhapsody	October 31, 2018	9,224,587	US$76.1 million
3	Mission: Impossible – Fallout	July 25, 2018	6,584,915	US$49.7 million
4	Jurassic World: Fallen Kingdom	June 6, 2018	5,661,128	US$44.2 million
5	Ant-Man and the Wasp	July 4, 2018	5,448,134	US$42.2 million
6	Black Panther	February 14, 2018	5,399,227	US$40.8 million
7	Venom	October 3, 2018	3,888,096	US$30.3 million
8	Deadpool 2	May 16, 2018	3,784,602	US$30.4 million
9	Coco	January 11, 2018	3,510,017	US$24.6 million
10	Aquaman	December 19, 2018	3,491,860	US$27.1 million

- *Admissions and gross are only for the year 2018 and does not equate to the eventual admissions and gross of a film.

== See also ==
- List of South Korean films of 2018
