= 4th Wildflower Film Awards =

2017 edition of award ceremony

- Date: April 12, 2017
- Site: Literature House, Seoul

The 4th Wildflower Film Awards (Korean: 들꽃영화상) is an awards ceremony recognizing the achievements of Korean independent and low-budget films. It was held at the Literature House in Seoul on April 12, 2017.

14 prizes were handed out to films nominated across 10 categories for both documentary and narrative works, each with a budget under ₩1 billion (US$890,000) and released theatrically between January 1 and December 31, 2016.

== Nominations and winners ==
(Winners denoted in bold)

Grand Prize
**The World of Us**
Best Director (Narrative Films)	Best Director (Documentaries)
**Kim Soo-hyun** - **Beaten Black and Blue**; Jung Ji-woo - Fourth Place; Kim Dae-hwan - End of Winter; Lee Joon-ik - Dongju: The Portrait of a Poet; Park Hong-min - Alone; Park Suk-young - Steel Flower; Zhang Lu - A Quiet Dream	**Kim Jung-keun** - **The Island of Shadows**; Kim Dong-ryung - Tour of Duty; Lee Seung-joon - Wind on the Moon; Lee So-hyun - Dear Grandma; Moon Jung-hyun, Vladimir Todorovic, Daniel Rudi Haryanto - Fluid Boundaries
Best Actor	Best Actress
**Park Jong-hwan** - **The Boys Who Cried Wolf**; Kang Ha-neul - Dongju: The Portrait of a Poet; Kim Joo-hyuk - Yourself and Yours; Moon Chang-gil - End of Winter; Park Hae-joon - Fourth Place; Park Jung-min - Dongju: The Portrait of a Poet	**Jeong Ha-dam** - **Steel Flower**; Han Ye-ri - Worst Woman; Lee Sang-hee - Our Love Story; Lee Yoo-young - Yourself and Yours; Ryu Sun-young - Our Love Story; Youn Yuh-jung - The Bacchus Lady
Best Screenplay	Best Cinematography
**Kim Jin-hwang** - **The Boys Who Cried Wolf**; Cha Hye-jin, Park Hong-min - Alone; Jung Ji-woo, Kim Min-ah - Fourth Place; Shin Yeon-shick - Dongju: The Portrait of a Poet; Yoon Ga-eun - The World of Us; Zhang Lu - A Quiet Dream	**Kim Byung-jung** - **Alone**; Choi Yong-jin - Dongju: The Portrait of a Poet; Kim Bo-ram - End of Winter; Kim Dong-ryung - Tour of Duty; Lee Hyo-jae - The Queen of Crime
Best New Director (Narrative Films)	Best New Director (Documentaries)
**Kim Dae-hwan** - **End of Winter**; Choi Seung-yeun - Su Saek; Kim Jin-hwang - The Boys Who Cried Wolf; Lee Hyun-joo - Our Love Story; Yoon Ga-eun - The World of Us	**Lee Dong-ha** - **Weekends**; Lee Hee-won - Holy Working Day; Lee So-hyun - Dear Grandma; Park So-hyun - The Knitting Club
Best New Actor/Actress	Best Supporting Actor/Actress
**Lee Sang-hee** - **Our Love Story**; Choi Soo-in - The World of Us; Koo Kyo-hwan - Beaten Black and Blue; Lee Joo-won - Alone; Seol Hye-in - The World of Us; Yoo Jae-sang - Fourth Place	**Choi Moo-sung** - **Snow Paths**; Ahn Ah-joo - The Bacchus Lady; Choi Hee-seo - Dongju: The Portrait of a Poet; Lee Hee-joon - Worst Woman; Lee Joo-young - A Quiet Dream
Special Achievement Award	Appreciation Award
**KwangHwaMoon Cinema** - **The King of Jokgu**	**Jeon Moo-song** - **Curtain Call**
