= One Win =

2023 film by Shin Yeon-shick

- Theatrical release poster
- Hangul: 1승
- Hanja: 1勝
- RR: 1seung
- MR: 1sŭng
- Directed by: Shin Yeon-shick
- Written by: Shin Yeon-shick; Cho Yoo-jin
- Produced by: Shin Yeon-shick; Kim Ji-hyung
- Starring: Song Kang-ho; Park Jeong-min; Jang Yoon-ju
- Cinematography: Choi Yong-jin
- Edited by: Kim Jung-hoon
- Music by: Mowg
- Production company: Luz Y Sonidos
- Distributed by: Kidari Studio; Artist Company; Zio Content
- Release dates: January 27, 2023 (Rotterdam); December 4, 2024 (South Korea)
- Running time: 107 minutes
- Country: South Korea
- Language: Korean
- Box office: US$1.9 million

One Win (Korean: 1승) is a 2023 South Korean sports drama film written, directed and produced by Shin Yeon-shick, and starring Song Kang-ho, Park Jeong-min and Jang Yoon-ju. It depicts the story of a volleyball coach who has never tasted success in his life, who meets a women's volleyball team that only needs one win and takes on a challenge.

The film premiered at the 52nd International Film Festival Rotterdam on January 27, 2023. It was released theatrically on December 4, 2024.

== Plot ==
Woo-jin, a former volleyball MVP who teaches a children's volleyball class on the brink of closure, is hired as the manager of the girls' volleyball team Pink Storm just before disbandment. According to his contract, Woo-jin only needs to win one game, which isn't a problem for him but his team has only second-class players. Pink Storm's owner Jeong-Won sells promising players to other clubs and only recruits players whom other clubs refuse to scout. And if the team wins even once, Jeong-won promises to give 20 million won to one random spectator. Thanks to this publicity, Pink Storm see its popularity soar and the season finally starts, but the team continues to lose. Woo-jin slowly but surely begins to change the team. Pink Storm, which consists of abandoned players, is about whether it can get "one win."

== Cast ==
- Song Kang-ho as Kim Woo-jin
- Park Jeong-min as Kang Jeong-won
- Jang Yoon-ju as Bang Soo-ji
- Park Myung-hoon as captain of Pink Storm
- Lee Min-ji as Yuki
- Na Hyun-woo as Bang Soo-ji's husband
- Lee Sook-ja as commentator
- Han Yoo-mi as opponent team player
- Jo Jung-suk as coach
- Kim Yeon-koung as a rookie volleyball player
- Shin Jin-sik as opponent team manager
- Kim Se-jin as opponent team manager

== Production ==
Filming began in November 2020, and concluded in February 2021.

== Release ==
The film was invited to the Big Screen Competition section at 52nd International Film Festival Rotterdam, where it had its world premiere on January 27, 2023.
