= Entourage (South Korean TV series) =

2016 South Korean TV series

- Promotional poster
- Genre: Black comedy Comedy drama
- Developed by: Studio Dragon
- Written by: Seo Jae-won; Kwon So-ra
- Directed by: Jang Young-woo
- Starring: Cho Jin-woong; Seo Kang-joon; Lee Kwang-soo; Park Jeong-min; Lee Dong-hwi
- Opening theme: "MASITNONSOUL" by Hyukoh
- Country of origin: South Korea
- Original language: Korean
- No. of episodes: 16

Production
- Executive producers: Jinnie Jin-hee Choi; Kim Young-kyu
- Producers: Ham Sung-hoon; Shin Ye-ji
- Running time: 59 minutes
- Production company: Studio Dragon (Under license from Warner Bros. International Television)

Original release
- Network: tvN
- Release: November 4 – December 24, 2016

Related
- Entourage

Entourage (Korean: 안투라지) is a South Korean television series starring Cho Jin-woong, Seo Kang-joon, Lee Kwang-soo, Park Jeong-min and Lee Dong-hwi. It is a black comedy-drama about life in the entertainment industry, based on the American television series of the same name. It started airing on cable network tvN from November 4, 2016, and finished airing on December 24, 2016.

The series scored low ratings in South Korea; some have argued that the low ratings were a result of the series being atypical of Korean dramas, particularly its black humour and perhaps American vibe.

== Synopsis ==
This is the story of a celebrity who depends on his three friends and boss who try to help him in his struggles as an actor and a man.

== Cast ==
=== Main ===
- Cho Jin-woong as Kim Eun-gab

The CEO of a management company, a powerful and well-connected agent who turns Young-bin from a pretty-boy actor into a rising star.

- Seo Kang-joon as Cha Young-bin

A rising superstar in his 20s, known for his handsome looks. Despite his fame, he is a vapid actor with delusions of artistic grandeur.

- Lee Kwang-soo as Cha Joon

Young-bin's cousin. A former member of Sugar Boys, an idol group who debut in the late 90s. Now he is a struggling actor desperate for more fame.

- Park Jeong-min as Lee Ho-jin

A.k.a. "Cup Noodles", he is Young-bin's best friend. An average boy-next-door who gets thrown into the world of showbiz when his best friend becomes a star. He now acts as Young-bin's personal manager and despite his will, is treated badly by the CEO, causing him to be skeptical about his job.

- Lee Dong-hwi as Geo-book (Turtle)

Young-bin and Ho-jin's childhood friend. A happy-go-lucky guy who is bright and positive, but has no luck with the ladies. He acts as the driver and odd job man of the group.

=== Supporting ===
- Kim Hye-in as Seo Ji-an, a fancy interior designer with celebrity connections.
- Ahn So-hee as Ahn So-hee, a famous actress and Young-bin's first love, later girlfriend.
- Choi Myung-gil as Kang Ok-ja, co-president of Eun-gab's management company and Ji-an's mother.
- Yoon Ji-hye as Yoon Se-na, Eun-gab's wife.
- Amber Liu as Joy Jung, Eun-gab's secretary and wishes to become manager.
- Ryu Han-bee as Kim Yoo-bin, Eun-gab's daughter.
- Jang So-yeon as Jo Tae-young, CEO of Idea Production Company.

=== Special appearances ===
- Ha Jung-woo (Ep 1)
- Kim Tae-ri (Ep 1)
- Park Chan-wook (Ep 1)
- Lee Tae-im as Cha Young-bin's ex-girlfriend (Ep 1)
- Mamamoo (Ep 1)
- Lim Na-young and Chungha (I.O.I) (Ep 1)
- Kwang-hyun Kim of SK Wyverns (Ep 2)
- Clara Lee (Ep 2)
- DJ Soda (Ep 2)
- Boom (Ep 3)
- Spica (Ep 3)
- Jin Seon-kyu as Eun-gab's friend (Ep 3, 4 & 6)
- Song Ji-hyo (Ep 3)
- Hyukoh (Ep 3)
- Park Han-byul (Ep 3)
- Song Hae-na (Ep 3)
- Jin Goo (Ep 4)
- Ahn Hye-kyung (Ep 4)
- Lee Eun (Ep 4, 5 & 6)
- Jin Jae-young (Ep 4)
- Lee Joon-ik (Ep 4)
- Kim Sung-kyun (Ep 4)
- Kang Ha-neul (Ep 5)
- Koo Young-joon (Ep 5)
- Kim Ki-bang (Ep 5)
- In Gyo-jin (Ep 6)
- So Yi-hyun (Ep 6)
- San E (Ep 6)
- Nam Da-reum as Wang Ho (Ep 6)
- Lee Da-in (Ep 7)
- Simon Dominic (Ep 7)
- Killagramz (Ep 7)
- Heo Tae-hee as Ahn So-hee's management director (Ep 7)
- Jee Seok-jin (Ep 9)
- Julien Kang (Ep 9)
- Sam Kim (Ep 9)
- Kyung Soo-jin as Seung-hyo (Ep 10)
- Moon Geun-young (Ep 12)
- Oh Chang-seok (Ep 13)
- Lee Sun-bin (Ep 13)
- Oh Dae-hwan as Director Yang (Ep 13)
- Lee El (Ep 13 & 14)
- Oh Dal-su (Ep 14)
- Ha Yeon-joo (Ep 14)
- Lee Min-ji as Mi-na (Ep 14)
- Lee Joo-yeon (Ep 14 & 15)
- Lee Sung-min (Ep 16)
- Song Won-seok as a model.

== Production ==
=== Development and Filming ===
First script reading took place on May 28, 2016 at CJ E&M Center in Sangamdong, Seoul, South Korea. Filming began on June 1, 2016 at a club in Gangnam, Seoul, South Korea; and wrapped up on September 26, 2016.

Entourage was entirely pre-produced. The airing rights to the show were sold to China for 300,000 USD per episode.

=== Original soundtrack ===
Mixtape #1

No.	Title	Artists	Length
1.	"MASITNONSOUL (맛있는술)"	Hyukoh	3:56
2.	"MASITNONSOUL (맛있는술)" (Inst.)		3:56
Total length:			7:52

Mixtape #2

No.	Title	Artists	Length
1.	"The Good"	Dok2 (feat. Hash Swan)	3:00
2.	"The Good" (Inst.)		3:00
Total length:			6:00

Mixtape #3

No.	Title	Artists	Length
1.	"2Night"	Eddy Kim & Punchnello
2.	"2Night" (Inst.)

Mixtape #4

No.	Title	Artists	Length
1.	"Entourage"	Samuel Seo
2.	"Entourage" (Inst.)

Mixtape #5

No.	Title	Artists	Length
1.	"Even You"	Reddy (feat. Kim Boa of Spica)
2.	"Even You" (Inst.)

Mixtape #6

No.	Title	Artists	Length
1.	"Put it down"	Dok2 (feat. Kim Hyo-eun and Changmo)
2.	"Put it down" (Inst.)

Mixtape #7

No.	Title	Artists	Length
1.	"Up up and away"	Beenzino (Prod by Shimmy Twice)
2.	"Up up and away" (Inst.)

== Ratings ==
Average TV viewership ratings
Ep.	Original broadcast date	Average audience share (Nationwide)	
Ep.	Original broadcast date	Nielsen Korea	TNmS
1	November 4, 2016	2.264%	2.8%
2	November 5, 2016	1.162%	1.5%
3	November 11, 2016	1.621%	1.8%
4	November 12, 2016	0.749%	1.2%
5	November 18, 2016	0.946%	1.4%
6	November 19, 2016	0.617%	0.8%
7	November 25, 2016	1.072%	1.1%
8	November 26, 2016	0.670%	0.8%
9	December 2, 2016	1.117%	1.4%
10	December 3, 2016	0.695%	0.9%
11	December 9, 2016	1.046%	1.4%
12	December 10, 2016	0.916%	1.0%
13	December 16, 2016	0.784%	1.6%
14	December 17, 2016	0.705%	1.1%
15	December 23, 2016	0.960%	1.0%
16	December 24, 2016	0.736%	1.0%
Average		1.004%	1.3%
In the table above, the blue numbers represent the lowest ratings and the red numbers represent the highest ratings.; This series aired on a cable channel/pay TV which normally has a relatively smaller audience compared to free-to-air TV/public broadcasters (KBS, SBS, MBC and EBS).
