= 25th Buil Film Awards =

2016 edition of award ceremony

- Date: October 7, 2016
- Site: BEXCO Auditorium, Haeundae, Busan
- Hosted by: On Joo-wan; Ahn Hee-sung

The 25th Buil Film Awards (Korean: 부일영화상) ceremony was hosted by the Busan-based daily newspaper Busan Ilbo. It was held on October 7, 2016, at the BEXCO Auditorium in Busan and was emceed by actor On Joo-wan and announcer Ahn Hee-sung.

== Nominations and winners ==
Complete list of nominees and winners:

(Winners denoted in bold)

Best Film	Best Director
**Veteran**; The Handmaiden; Inside Men; Train to Busan; The Wailing	**Lee Joon-ik** - **Dongju: The Portrait of a Poet**; Lee Kyoung-mi - The Truth Beneath; Na Hong-jin - The Wailing; Park Chan-wook - The Handmaiden; Ryoo Seung-wan - Veteran
Best Actor	Best Actress
**Lee Byung-hun** - **Inside Men**; Hwang Jung-min - Veteran; Jung Jae-young - Right Now, Wrong Then; Kang Ha-neul - Dongju: The Portrait of a Poet; Kwak Do-won - The Wailing	**Son Ye-jin** - **The Truth Beneath**; Han Hyo-joo - The Beauty Inside; Kim Hye-soo - Familyhood; Kim Min-hee - The Handmaiden; Lee Jung-hyun - Alice in Earnestland
Best Supporting Actor	Best Supporting Actress
**Kim Eui-sung** - **Train to Busan**; Hwang Jung-min - The Wailing; Jun Kunimura - The Wailing; Ma Dong-seok - Goodbye Single; Park Jung-min - Dongju: The Portrait of a Poet	**Park So-dam** - **The Priests**; Chun Woo-hee - The Wailing; Jeon Hye-jin - The Throne; Jung Yu-mi - Train to Busan; Ra Mi-ran - The Himalayas
Best New Actor	Best New Actress
**Tae In-ho** - **Shadow Island**; Kim Jung-hyun - Overman; Park Hae-joon - 4th Place; Park Jong-hwan - The Boys Who Cried Wolf; Park Jung-min - Dongju: The Portrait of a Poet	**Kim Tae-ri** - **The Handmaiden**; Choi Soo-in - The World of Us; Jeong Ha-dam - Steel Flower; Kim Hwan-hee - The Wailing; Park So-dam - The Priests
Best New Director	Best Screenplay
**Yoon Ga-eun** - **The World of Us**; Ahn Gooc-jin - Alice in Earnestland; Kim Dae-hwan - End of Winter; Kim Jin-hwang - The Boys Who Cried Wolf; Lee Kyoung-mi - The Truth Beneath	**Shin Yeon-shick** - **Dongju: The Portrait of a Poet**; Ahn Gooc-jin - Alice in Earnestland; Ryoo Seung-wan - Veteran; Woo Min-ho - Inside Men; Yoon Ga-eun - The World of Us
Best Cinematography	Best Art Direction
**Choi Young-hwan** - **Veteran**; Hong Kyung-pyo - The Wailing; Im Heung-soon & 3 others - Factory Complex; Jung Jung-hoon - The Handmaiden; Lee Hyung-deok - Train to Busan	**Ryu Seong-hui** - **The Handmaiden**; Jang Geun-young - Phantom Detective; Kang Seung-yong - The Throne; Lee Hoo-kyung - The Wailing; Lee Mok-won - Train to Busan
Best Music	Buil Readers' Jury Award
**Mowg** - **Dongju: The Portrait of a Poet**; Bang Jun-seok - The Throne; Bang Jun-seok - Veteran; Jang Young-gyu & Dalpalan - The Wailing; Jo Yeong-wook - The Handmaiden	**The Handmaiden**
Yu Hyun-mok Film Arts Award
**Yeon Sang-ho** - **Train to Busan**
