= End of Winter =

- Film poster
- Directed by: Kim Dae-hwan
- Screenplay by: Park Jin-soo
- Produced by: Lee Im-geol
- Starring: Mun Chang-gil; Lee Young-ran; Kim Min-hyeuk; Lee Sang-hee; Hur Jae-won
- Cinematography: Kim Bo-ram
- Edited by: Kim Dae-hwan
- Music by: Kang Min-kook
- Production company: Tiger Cinema
- Release dates: October 2014 (BIFF); April 21, 2016 (South Korea)
- Running time: 99-102 minutes
- Country: South Korea
- Language: Korean

End of Winter (Korean: 철원기행; RR: Cheorwongihaeng) is a 2014 South Korean drama film. Directed by Kim Dae-hwan in his feature debut and a project of the Graduate School of Cinematic Content at Dankook University, it explores the breakup of a family. It made its world premiere at the 19th Busan International Film Festival in 2014 and won New Currents Award.

== Synopsis ==
Kim Sung-geun's (Mun Chang-gil) wife, two sons and daughter-in-law gather in Cheorwon for his retirement ceremony as he ends his teaching career at the Cheorwon Technical High School. While eating at a Chinese restaurant, he drops the bombshell and announces he plans to get a divorce. Without explaining his decision, it leaves his shocked wife Yoon Yeo-jung (Lee Young-ran) angry and speechless, and the family in confusion. When heavy snow prevents them from leaving, they are forced to stay at Sung-geun's apartment, leading to an uncomfortable time together as they seek shelter from the cold winter.

== Cast ==
- Mun Chang-gil as Kim Sung-geun
- Lee Young-ran as Yoon Yeo-jung
- Kim Min-hyeuk as Kim Dong-wook
- Lee Sang-hee as Hye-jung
- Hur Jae-won as Su-hyung
- Park Chan-yun

== Reception ==
BIFF's jury head Iranian director Asghar Farhadi: "It impressed us with its stylistic consistency, its skillful exploration of family relations, its elegant mastery of cinematic space, and its great ensemble cast."

The Hollywood Reporter: "First time filmmaker Kim Dae-hwan makes an impression with a well acted and recognizable snapshot of family strife."

Screen International: "Kim Dae-hwan's impressive and dispassionate debut feature tackles such (trials and tribulations of family life) issues with a sensible sense of restraint through its rich but subtle aesthetic as it follows a family on the verge of turmoil after the father suddenly announces he wants a divorce."

Pierce Conran: "End of Winter boasts strong performances and an admirably restrained yet intelligent mis-en-scene. However, in its resemblance to many other Korean family dramas...it will have trouble standing out from the pack."

== Awards and nominations ==
Year	Award	Category	Recipient	Result
2014	19th Busan International Film Festival	New Currents Award	End of Winter	Won
2015	18th Shanghai International Film Festival	Asian New Talent Award	Kim Dae-hwan	Nominated
2015	12th Yerevan International Film Festival	Silver Apricot for Feature Film	End of Winter	Won
2015	9th Asia Pacific Screen Awards	Best Feature Film	End of Winter	Nominated
2016	25th Buil Film Awards	Best New Director	Kim Dae-hwan	Nominated
2017	4th Wildflower Film Awards	Best Director (Narrative Films)	Kim Dae-hwan	Nominated
2017	4th Wildflower Film Awards	Best New Director (Narrative Films)	Kim Dae-hwan	Won
2017	4th Wildflower Film Awards	Best Actor	Mun Chang-gil	Nominated
2017	4th Wildflower Film Awards	Best Cinematography	Kim Bo-ram	Nominated
