= The Age of Shadows =

2016 South Korean period action film

- Theatrical release poster
- Hangul: 밀정
- Hanja: 密偵
- Lit.: Emissary
- RR: Miljeong
- MR: Milchŏng
- Directed by: Kim Jee-woon
- Written by: Lee Ji-min; Park Jong-dae
- Produced by: Choi Jeong-hwa; Kim Jee-woon
- Starring: Song Kang-ho; Gong Yoo; Han Ji-min; Shingo Tsurumi; Uhm Tae-goo; Shin Sung-rok
- Cinematography: Kim Ji-yong
- Edited by: Yang Jin-mo
- Music by: Mowg
- Production companies: Grimm Pictures; Warner Bros. Korea; Harbin Films
- Distributed by: Warner Bros. Pictures
- Release dates: 3 September 2016 (Venice); 7 September 2016 (South Korea)
- Running time: 140 minutes
- Country: South Korea
- Languages: Korean; Japanese
- Budget: US$8.62 million
- Box office: US$55.3 million

The Age of Shadows (Korean: 밀정; lit. 'Emissary') is a 2016 South Korean period action thriller film directed by Kim Jee-woon and written by Lee Ji-min and Park Jong-dae. The film is set in Shanghai and Seoul in the 1920s and stars Song Kang-ho and Gong Yoo.

It was selected as the South Korean entry for the Best Foreign Language Film at the 89th Academy Awards, but it was not nominated. The film won the Best Picture award in the Action Features category at the 2016 Fantastic Fest held in Austin, Texas.

== Plot ==
Kim Jang-ok and Joo Dong-sung, members of the Korean independence group Heroic Corps, visit the wealthy Kim Hwang-sub under the pretense of securing military funds, but it is a trap. Surrounded by Japanese forces, Kim Jang-ok fights valiantly in a gun battle but ultimately takes his own life, despite pleas from his former friend Lee Jung-chool, now working for the Japanese police. Lee, however, quietly releases Joo Dong-sung, arousing suspicion among fellow Heroic Corps members. Internal distrust peaks when Jo Hwe-ryung accuses Joo of being a traitor, but Kim Woo-jin intervenes and banishes Joo for his compromised identity.

Following the incident, Japanese authorities order Lee Jung-chool to investigate Kim Woo-jin. Despite recognizing each other's true identities, Lee and Kim feign friendship. Meanwhile, Lee is assigned a partner, Hashimoto, whose real task is to monitor Lee himself. As surveillance intensifies, Lee attempts to protect the Heroic Corps by delaying Hashimoto's actions, but the group narrowly escapes to Shanghai. In Shanghai, Heroic Corps leader Jung Chae-san and Kim Woo-jin ply the apprehensive Lee to assist their cause. Lee begrudgingly agrees to act as a double agent and help them smuggle explosives back to Korea.

On a train to Korea, Lee warns Kim Woo-jin that an informant is among them. Kim devises a trap by feeding different rendezvous times to each member to expose the informant. When the leak confirms the informant's identity, it is revealed to be Jo Hwe-ryung. A shootout ensues and Hashimoto is killed. Hwe-ryung explains that he had lost faith in the resistance's effectiveness, to which Kim executes him for his treachery. Lee, fearful of discovery, tells Kim he can no longer help the resistance and feigns being thrown off the train. As the group arrives in Keijō (Seoul), chaos erupts when police identify them. Yeon Gye-soon kills officers attempting to arrest her, triggering a shootout where most of the resistance members die or are captured. Kim escapes with help, managing to smuggle in the explosives.

Lee, under suspicion, is ordered to find Kim and sorrowfully tortures Gye-soon to maintain his alibi. Eventually, Lee is tricked by Joo Dong-sung and leads authorities to Kim's hideout. Kim is captured after a desperate escape attempt. To avoid revealing secrets under torture, Kim bites off his own tongue. Lee is also arrested but feigns loyalty to the Japanese to receive a light sentence. During the trial, Lee tearfully insists he was never aligned with the resistance, honoring Kim's last request to act as a non-affiliate so their mission could continue.

After release, Lee learns of Gye-soon's death and receives word of a party hosted by Japanese collaborators. Spurred by Kim's final wish to not let their lives be wasted, Lee plants explosives at the event. Simultaneously, a Heroic Corps operative assassinates Joo Dong-sung. The bomb detonates, killing high-ranking officials including Higashi. Back in prison, a mute Kim Woo-jin hears of the mission's success and smiles in relief. Lee later finds Kim Hwang-sub, whose betrayal led to Kim Jang-ok's death, and kills him to avenge his friend. Afterwards, Lee relays a message to Chae-san, saying they will see each other again. A package, implied to be filled with explosives, is delivered to the Japanese national headquarters in Korea. Kim is shown in his cell faintly smiling under a scratching saying "Resistance fighters go through here."

== Cast ==
- Song Kang-ho as Lee Jung-chool
- Gong Yoo as Kim Woo-jin
- Han Ji-min as Yeon Gye-soon
- Shingo Tsurumi as Higashi
- Uhm Tae-goo as Hashimoto
- Shin Sung-rok as Jo Hwe-ryung
- Heo Sung-tae as Ha Il-soo
- Kim Dong-young as Ha Chul-joo
- Go Jun as Shim Sang-do
- Seo Young-joo as Joo Dong-sung
- Jung Yoo-ahn as Hwang Ui-seo
- Kwon Soo-hyun as Sun-gil
- Lee Hwan as Park Dae-yi
- Kwak Ja-hyung as Seo Jin-dol
- Yoo Sang-jae as Hunter Park
- Jo Young-gyu as Kim Hak-jin
- Choi Yu-hwa as Kim Sa-hee
- Han Soo-yeon as Mae-hyang
- Nam Moon-chul as Kim Hwang-sub
- Kim Soo-woong as Saito
- Lee Seol-goo as Oh Nam-won
- Choi Jang-won as Noh Duk-soo
- Heo Hyung-gyu as Jung Woo-sik
- Baek In-kwon as Park Woong
- Jung Do-won as Woo Ma-e
- Lee Soo-kwang as Hideo
- Kim Ui-gun as Heo Jung-goo
- Hiromitsu Takeda as Takeda
- Shin Sung-il as Park Ga
- Oh Ha-nee as Hwang Seo-im
- Foster Burden as Ludvik
- Izo Oikawa as Umano
- Kazuhiko Ikebe as Nakada
- Lee Byung-hun as Jung Chae-san
- Park Hee-soon as Kim Jang-ok

== Production ==
On August 3, 2015, it was announced that Warner Bros. would finance and distribute its first ever Korean-language 1930s set drama Secret Agent, and the $8.62 million budgeted film would also be produced by Grimm Pictures. The project and script was developed by Lee Ji-min and Park Jong-dae, which Kim Jee-woon would direct and the cast would be Song Kang-ho and Gong Yoo. A trailer was released on July 14, 2016, revealing the new title as The Age of Shadows.

== Reception ==
=== Box office ===
The film topped the South Korean box office for three consecutive weeks.

=== Critical response ===
The film has received critical acclaim. On Rotten Tomatoes, it holds an approval rating of 100%, based on 49 reviews with an average rating of 7.3/10. The website's consensus reads: "The Age of Shadows justifies its imposing length with a richly detailed period drama whose sprawling size is matched by strong acting, impressive craft, and narrative depth." On Metacritic, it holds a weighted average score of 78/100, based on 14 reviews, indicating "generally favorable reviews".

The Film Stage gave the film a positive review, writes "In short, mainstream audiences should get a kick out of this polished, often exciting patriotist drama. But those looking for a deeper, mightier resonance would be well advised to keep their expectations in check." The Hollywood Reporter describes the film as "a patriotic costumer" and says, "Several impressive action scenes sustain the tension and electrify this overlong, often hard-to-follow story". Variety wrote, "Cult director Kim Jee-woon delivers the goods with an ultra-stylish cloak-and-dagger actioner". Screendaily noted that, "Local audiences should respond well to the stirring patriotic sentiment on display here".

=== Accolades ===
Year	Award	Category	Recipient	Result	Ref.
2016	36th Korean Association of Film Critics Awards	Best Film	The Age of Shadows	Won	
2016	36th Korean Association of Film Critics Awards	Best Music	Mowg	Won	
2016	37th Blue Dragon Film Awards	Best Film	The Age of Shadows	Nominated	
2016	37th Blue Dragon Film Awards	Best Director	Kim Jee-woon	Nominated	
2016	37th Blue Dragon Film Awards	Best Actor	Song Kang-ho	Nominated	
2016	37th Blue Dragon Film Awards	Best Supporting Actor	Uhm Tae-goo	Nominated	
2016	37th Blue Dragon Film Awards	Best Art Direction	Jo Hwa-seong	Nominated	
2016	37th Blue Dragon Film Awards	Best Music	Mowg	Nominated	
2016	53rd Grand Bell Awards	Best Film	The Age of Shadows	Nominated	
2016	53rd Grand Bell Awards	Best Director	Kim Jee-woon	Nominated	
2016	53rd Grand Bell Awards	Best Actor	Song Kang-ho	Nominated	
2016	53rd Grand Bell Awards	Best Supporting Actress	Han Ji-min	Nominated	
2016	53rd Grand Bell Awards	Best Supporting Actor	Uhm Tae-goo	Won	
2016	53rd Grand Bell Awards	Best Art Design	Jo Hwa-sung	Won	
2017	11th Asian Film Awards	Best Film	The Age of Shadows	Nominated	
2017	11th Asian Film Awards	Best Composer	Mowg	Won	
2017	11th Asian Film Awards	Best Cinematographer	Kim Ji-yong	Nominated	
2017	53rd Baeksang Arts Awards	Best Film	The Age of Shadows	Nominated	
2017	53rd Baeksang Arts Awards	Best Director	Kim Jee-woon	Won	
2017	53rd Baeksang Arts Awards	Best Actor	Song Kang-ho	Won	
2017	53rd Baeksang Arts Awards	Best Supporting Actor	Uhm Tae-goo	Nominated	
2017	53rd Baeksang Arts Awards	Best Supporting Actress	Han Ji-min	Nominated	
2017	53rd Baeksang Arts Awards	Best Screenplay	Lee Ji-min, Park Jong-dae	Nominated	

== See also ==
- Assassination, a 2015 South Korean film with similar topic and background
- List of submissions to the 89th Academy Awards for Best Foreign Language Film
- List of South Korean submissions for the Academy Award for Best Foreign Language Film
