= The Fatal Encounter =

- Theatrical release poster
- Hangul: 역린
- Hanja: 逆鱗
- RR: Yeongnin
- MR: Yŏngnin
- Directed by: Lee Jae-kyoo
- Written by: Choi Sung-hyeon
- Produced by: Choi Nak-kwon
- Starring: Hyun Bin; Jung Jae-young; Jo Jung-suk; Han Ji-min
- Cinematography: Go Nak-seon
- Edited by: Shin Min-kyung
- Music by: Mowg
- Production company: Good Choice Cut Pictures
- Distributed by: Lotte Entertainment
- Release date: April 30, 2014
- Running time: 135 minutes
- Country: South Korea
- Language: Korean
- Budget: US$9.6 million
- Box office: US$22.9 million

The Fatal Encounter (Korean: 역린; RR: Yeongnin; lit. 'The King's Wrath') is a 2014 South Korean period action film based on a real-life assassination attempt on King Jeongjo. Jeongjo is portrayed by Hyun Bin, in his first role in a period film and first acting project after being discharged from mandatory military service.

== Background ==
King Jeongjo (1752–1800) was the 22nd ruler of the Joseon Dynasty, nicknamed the "King of Misfortune." When he was 10 years old, Jeongjo witnessed the death of his father Crown Prince Sado, who was executed by a royal decree ordered by his grandfather, then-King Yeongjo. During his reign, Jeongjo was subsequently caught in the midst of fierce party strife between the Noron and Soron factions, and survived seven assassination attempts just in his first year as king. The film is inspired by Jeongyuyeokbyeon, one such assassination attempt on Jeongjo by his political opponents in 1777, the king's first year as the nation's ruler. The Fatal Encounter depicts the 24 hours leading up to that event in Jeongjo's life and those around him.

== Plot ==
In 1777, one year after he began his reign, King Jeongjo lives a perilous palace life amidst opposition and threats from those around him who harbor political ambitions. He prepares himself for possible attacks by working out alone in the palace. Jeongjo is a calm and considerate man, but he is also afraid. The only one he trusts is his loyal court servant Gap-soo, called the king's shadow.

When Gap-soo was young, he was sold to a cruel man named Gwang-baek, who illegally and brutally trains orphaned children to become professional assassins. Gap-soo befriends Eul-soo, another orphan who is a few years younger than him. When Gwang-baek is instructed to give one of his children to become a court eunuch, he asks Gap-soo and Eul-soo to play the game of rock-paper-scissors; Gap-soo purposely loses the game in an effort to protect Eul-soo. Thus, Gap-soo is castrated and sent to the royal palace. There he meets Jeongjo, a young boy who is still mourning his father's death. Meanwhile, Eul-soo continues enduring harsh training and grows up as a merciless killer.

Years later, Eul-soo, now the deadliest member of the secret group of assassins, receives orders to kill Jeongjo within 24 hours. He infiltrates the palace, where he falls in love with Wol-hye, a kungnyŏ (or female court servant). Jeongjo's mother Lady Hyegyŏng is also locked in dangerous conflict with the late King Yeongjo's much younger widow, dowager Queen Jeongsun. Meanwhile, Gap-soo confesses his dark past to Jeongjo and swears to protect him.

== Cast ==
- Hyun Bin as King Jeongjo.
  - Goo Seung-hyun as young Jeongjo
- Jung Jae-young as Gap-soo/Sang-chaek, an assassin sent to kill the king who goes undercover as a royal eunuch, but who becomes convinced of Jeongjo's fitness to rule.
  - Sung Yu-bin as young Sang-chaek
- Jo Jung-suk as Eul-soo/Sal-soo, an assassin hired to kill Jeongjo.
  - Chun Bo-geun as young Sal-soo
- Cho Jae-hyun as Gwang-baek, who kidnaps orphaned children and trains them into ruthless assassins.
- Han Ji-min as Queen Jeongsun, the queen dowager, consort of Jeongjo's grandfather King Yeongjo, and Jeongjo's political rival.
- Kim Sung-ryung as Lady Hyegyŏng of the Poongsan Hong clan, Jeongjo's mother, who is desperate to save her son.
- Park Sung-woong as Hong Guk-yeong, a politician who strongly supports Jeongjo.
- Go Bo-gyeol as laundry court lady at palace
- Jung Eun-chae as Kang Wol-hye, a female court servant in charge of the king's clothing.
  - Lee Jae-hee as young Wol-hye
- Song Young-chang as Gu Seon-bok
- Lee Do-kyeong as Ahn Guk-rae
- Seo Yi-sook as Go Soo-ae
- Kim Min-jae as Choi Se-bok
- Kim Dae-myung as Kang Yong-hwi
- Kim Ju-wan as Hong Sang-beom
- Yoo Eun-mi as Bok-bing
- Lee Jun-hyeok

== Release ==
The Fatal Encounter was released in South Korea on April 30, 2014. The film also had a limited theatrical run in 25 North American cinemas on May 23.

== Box office ==
The Fatal Encounter attracted 1.7 million admissions and ₩13.1 billion (US$12.7 million) on its first five days in the theaters. The opening was the biggest for a local release in 2014, though it trailed to debuts of Hollywood tentpoles Captain America: The Winter Soldier and The Amazing Spider-Man 2.

Despite receiving mostly mixed to negative reviews from critics after its press screening, the period blockbuster has sold over 3.2 million tickets two weeks since its release.

It grossed ₩29.9 billion and sold 3.85 million tickets in South Korea.

== Awards and nominations ==
Year	Award	Category	Recipient	Result
2014	23rd Buil Film Awards	Best Cinematography	Go Nak-seon	Nominated
2014	23rd Buil Film Awards	Best Art Direction	Cho Hwa-sung	Nominated
2014	23rd Buil Film Awards	Best Music	Mowg	Nominated
2014	51st Grand Bell Awards	Best Art Direction	Cho Hwa-sung	Won
2014	51st Grand Bell Awards	Best Costume Design	Jeong Gyeong-hee	Nominated
2014	51st Grand Bell Awards	Best Music	Mowg	Nominated
2014	51st Grand Bell Awards	Technical Award (martial arts)	Yang Kil-young	Nominated
2014	1st Korean Film Producers Association Awards	Best Lighting	Cha Sang-kyun	Won
2014	1st Korean Film Producers Association Awards	Best Art Direction	Cho Hwa-sung	Won
2014	1st Korean Film Producers Association Awards	Best Sound	Kim Chang-seop	Won
2015	20th Chunsa Film Art Awards	Technical Award		Nominated
2015	9th Asian Film Awards	Best Composer	Mowg	Nominated
2015	9th Asian Film Awards	Best Costume Designer	Jeong Gyeong-hee	Nominated
