= Psychokinesis (film) =

2018 film by Yeon Sang-ho

- Theatrical release poster
- Hangul: 염력
- Hanja: 念力
- RR: Yeomnyeok
- MR: Yŏmnyŏk
- Directed by: Yeon Sang-ho
- Written by: Yeon Sang-ho
- Produced by: Kim Yeon-ho
- Starring: Ryu Seung-ryong; Shim Eun-kyung; Park Jeong-min; Kim Min-jae; Jung Yu-mi
- Cinematography: Byun Bong-sun
- Edited by: Yang Jin-mo
- Music by: Jang Young-gyu
- Production company: Redpeter Film
- Distributed by: Next Entertainment World (South Korea); Netflix (worldwide)
- Release date: January 31, 2018
- Running time: 101 minutes
- Country: South Korea
- Language: Korean
- Box office: US$7 million

Psychokinesis (Korean: 염력; RR: Yeomnyeok) is a 2018 South Korean black comedy superhero film written and directed by Yeon Sang-ho. The film stars Ryu Seung-ryong, Shim Eun-kyung, Park Jeong-min, Kim Min-jae and Jung Yu-mi in the lead roles. This is director Yeon Sang-ho's second live-action film, following his live-action debut Train to Busan in 2016. It is the first South Korean superhero film, and revolves around a bank security guard who gains telekinetic superpowers after drinking water from a mountain spring affected by a meteor, and decides to use them for saving his estranged daughter and her neighborhood from an evil construction company.

Psychokinesis was released on January 31, 2018 in South Korean theaters, in both 2D as well as ScreenX formats. The film was later on made available to stream globally on Netflix starting April 25, 2018.

== Plot ==
Shin Roo-mi runs a successful fried chicken restaurant in Seoul. She becomes involved in a real estate battle with a mob-run construction company, Tae-san. The company plans to demolish her small business and construct a large shopping center for Chinese tourists. One night while Roo-mi is forcibly evicted from her shop by hired thugs, her mother is killed in the violent clash. Later in the hospital, the death of Roo-mi's mother is interspersed with shots of a falling meteor.

Seok-heon, Roo-mi's estranged father, a seemingly happy-go-lucky security guard who engages in petty theft, gains telekinetic powers after he drinks water from a mountain spring hit by the meteor. Roo-mi contacts Seok-heon to inform him of his former wife's death and subsequent funeral. There he witnesses a confrontation between Roo-mi and President Min, who manages Tae-san's operations. Min attempts to compensate Roo-mi for her loss, but she furiously refuses and demands that he leave the premises. Seok-heon learns more about the turf war from Kim Jung-hyun, a young attorney representing the legal interests of Roo-mi and the other local shop owners. Seok-heon tries to reconnect with Roo-mi, but she is still hurt by his abandonment of her as a child. When he later tries to demonstrate his newfound ability, Roo-mi accuses Seok-heon of being an irresponsible parent.

The shop owners join Roo-mi in a shared legal battle against Tae-san, as they have been refused compensation for the loss of their businesses. While they barricade themselves in a shopping arcade, Tae-san's thugs arrive and begin assaulting them. Seok-heon arrives and uses his powers to fight off the assailants, leaving everybody around him in shock and wonder. When Min attempts to report the events to the police, the officer on duty does not believe him, much to the shop owners' amusement and delight.

Seok-heon further uses his telekinesis to build a large barricade around the market area, protecting the local businesses. Meanwhile, Min meets up with Director Hong, the owner of Tae-san who is aware of Seok-heon's powers. She orders Min to start another company under a different name and draw up a new contract to legally demolish the local businesses. She uses her connections to gain support from the police and creates a diversion by having Seok-heon arrested under false charges. After removing Seok-heon from the situation, Min and his thugs order the riot police to destroy the barricade and arrest the shop owners. Roo-mi and the shop owners flee to a nearby building with the police in pursuit.

After seeing the situation on the news, Seok-heon breaks out of his jail cell and musters the ability to fly. He arrives at the site just as the shop owners reach the rooftop of another building and the SWAT team arrives via a portable building suspended on a crane. They capture Roo-mi and drag her into the suspended building. Unfortunately, the crane malfunctions and Roo-mi falls out. Seok-heon swoops in and saves her, before leaving her in the care of the escaped shop owners. He confronts Min, who is in attendance with the riot police, and punches him unconscious before turning himself in to the police.

Four years later, Seok-heon is released from prison and is picked up by Jung-hyun, who announces his engagement to Roo-mi. They visit the location where Roo-mi's restaurant used to be, which is now an empty and unoccupied plot; Jung-hyun explains that Tae-san's project was ultimately not profitable and construction has been delayed. They arrive at Roo-mi's new restaurant, where Seok-heon reunites with his daughter and the local shop owners. He then uses his powers to serve drinks to the customers, much to everyone's delight. It is then revealed that Roo-mi named her new restaurant, "Superpower Chicken".

== Cast ==
- Ryu Seung-ryong as Shin Seok-heon
- Shim Eun-kyung as Shin Roo-mi
  - Go Na-hee as young Shin Roo-mi
- Park Jeong-min as Kim Jung-hyun
- Kim Min-jae as President Min
- Jung Yu-mi as Director Hong
- Yoo Seung-mok as Mr. Kim
- Lee Jeong-eun as Mr. Kim's wife
- Kim Young-sun as Roo-mi's mom
- Ye Soo-jung as Mr. Jeong's sister
- Ham Sung-min as Small worker
- Shim So-young as Evicted resident
- Tae Hang-ho as President Min's subordinate

== Production ==
Filming began on April 17, 2017 and ended on August 6, 2017, in Chuncheon, Gangwon Province.

== Release ==
Rated 15 by the Korea Media Rating Board, the film was released theatrically in South Korea on January 31, 2018. It was later distributed globally by Netflix starting April 25, 2018.

== Reception ==
=== Critical response ===
Richard Gray from The Reel Bits gave the film 4 stars out of 5, and called the film "A fresh take on a superhero origin story that combines sharp social commentary, comedy, and some impressively scaled action sequences." Donnia Harrington from Comic Book Debate also gave the film 4 stars out of 5 and wrote that the film "hooks you with its story and its characters and is unapologetically aware that this isn't Captain America. This isn't Superman. This is Seok-heon, average joe with above average abilities." Common Sense Media gave the film 4 stars out of 5 as well, and called it "an enjoyable movie for mature teens and up." In another 4 stars out of 5 review, Emmanuel Báez from Cinefiloz.com wrote "The director of the mega global success Train to Busan now takes another trend theme in commercial cinema - in this case, that of superheroes - and adds his own condiments to form a fairly solid story that only takes advantage of its premise to tell a story that is much more interesting in the background." Rohan Naahar from Hindustan Times gave the film 3.5 stars out of 5, writing "It's part redemption tale, part superhero origin story and especially in that showdown at the end, part Western. It's another promising movie by Yeon Sang-ho, who has established himself as one of the most exciting voices to emerge out of this Golden Age of Korean cinema."

Karen Han from the Thrillist also gave it a positive review and called it "One of the finest superhero movies of the decade." She also wrote "The only pity is that Psychokinesis isn't receiving a theatrical release outside of South Korea. Despite being about an ultimately mundane conflict, it's filmed with the same energy and grand sense of scale as any recent blockbuster. Maybe it's a little silly, but all superhero films are. Yeon is just the rare breed of director who knows how to turn that kind of genre stamp to his advantage." Joe Reid from Decider.com wrote "This is a movie that starts out pretty strange, but it absolutely rewards you for sticking with it. It will also make you want to run-not-walk to track down Yeon Sang-ho's previous film, Train to Busan, which got the director some of his best-ever reviews a couple years ago." Eric Ortiz Garcia from Screen Anarchy responded positively as well, writing that the film "always leads us to the epic clash between the hero and the antagonists, inherent to the superhero film, and it doesn't disappoint with its eventual visual spectacle; but it also keeps the story in a more humane margin, stressing on the fact that the protagonist is really only a father trying to be better than yesterday with his daughter." Herman Dhaliwal from Cinema Sanctum wrote "It's a joyous film that is absolutely worth seeking out because Yeon Sang-ho understands more than most that all the spectacle in the world won't mean anything if you don't have characters worth rooting for."

The review aggregator website Rotten Tomatoes reported that 80% of critics have given the film a positive review based on 10 reviews, with an average rating of 6.3/10.

=== Box office ===
Psychokinesis opened in 2D and ScreenX formats in South Korean theatres on January 31, 2018. Released on 1,099 screens, it opened at the number-one position and surpassed the already running film Keys to the Heart, which premiered on January 17, 2018, for the number one spot in its first weekend of release. It ran for 10 weeks and collected $6.98 million at the box office.

=== Accolades ===
Award	Category	Recipient(s)	Result	Ref.
55th Grand Bell Awards	Best Supporting Actress	Jung Yu-mi	Nominated	
