= Sunset in My Hometown =

- Theatrical release poster
- Hangul: 변산
- Hanja: 邊山
- RR: Byeonsan
- MR: Pyŏnsan
- Directed by: Lee Joon-ik
- Written by: Kim Se-gyum
- Produced by: Kim Sung-chul
- Starring: Park Jeong-min; Kim Go-eun
- Cinematography: Lee Eui-tae
- Edited by: Kim Jeong-hoon
- Music by: Bang Jun-seok
- Distributed by: Megabox Plus M
- Release date: July 4, 2018
- Running time: 123 minutes
- Country: South Korea
- Language: Korean
- Box office: US$3.6 million

Sunset in My Hometown (Korean: 변산; RR: Byeonsan) is a 2018 South Korean drama film and the thirteenth feature film directed by Lee Joon-ik, starring Park Jeong-min and Kim Go-eun. It follows struggling underground rapper Hak-soo as he returns to his hometown Byeonsan (Buan County) after a fateful phone call, reuniting with childhood friends like Sun-mi and experiencing a journey filled with laughter and heartfelt moments. The film was theatrically released on July 4, 2018.

== Plot ==
Juggling valet parking and convenience store shifts, Hak-soo, an aspiring rapper known as Simbbuk, endures a tough and unrelenting youth. Despite six consecutive years of competing in Show Me the Money, he remains unknown. Then, at the lowest point of his life after yet another failed audition, he receives an unexpected call that drags him back to the hometown he desperately wanted to forget: Byeonsan.

Lured back by a sneaky trick from his old crush Sun-mi, Hak-soo is reluctantly forced to return home. As he reconnects with persistent childhood friends, embarrassing memories he wanted to erase start resurfacing one by one. Desperate to escape, he finds himself caught in unpredictable events, pushing him into the biggest crisis of his life.

== Cast ==
- Park Jeong-min as Hak-soo, an unsuccessful rapper in Seoul who returns to his long-abandoned hometown of Byeonsan in the countryside following a phone call from home.
- Kim Go-eun as Sun-mi, Hak-soo's childhood classmate.
- Jang Hang-sun as Hak-soo's father
- Go Jun as Yong-dae
  - Kang Hyun-goo as Young Yong-dae
- Shin Hyun-been as Mi-kyung
- Jung Kyu-soo as Sun-mi's father
- Kim Jun-han as Won-joon
- Bae Jae-ki as Sang-ryul
- Choi Jeong-heon as Goo-bok
- Im Seong-jae as Seok-gi
- Andup as himself
- Song Duk-ho as Rapper
- Cha Soon-bae as doctor

== Production ==
Production began in Seoul on September 11, 2017. Filming wrapped in Chuncheon, Gangwon Province on November 18, 2017.

== Release ==
Sunset in My Hometown opened in local theaters on July 4, 2018.

== Reception ==
Yoon Min-sik of The Korea Herald praised the characters and dialogue for being charming and natural; as well as the chemistry between lead actors Park and Kim. Shim Sun-ah of Yonhap News Agency praised the film for being heartwarming, inspiring and humorous.

== Awards and nominations ==
Awards	Category	Recipient	Result	Ref.
27th Buil Film Awards	Best Music	Bang Jun-seok	Nominated	
55th Grand Bell Awards	Best Music	Bang Jun-seok	Nominated	
39th Blue Dragon Film Awards	Best Music	Bang Jun-seok	Nominated	
