= Choi Soo-in =

South Korean actress

- Born: March 5, 2004 (age 22); Seoul, South Korea
- Occupation: Actress
- Years active: 2015–present
- Agent(s): J,Wide-Company

Korean name
- Hangul: 최수인
- RR: Choe Suin
- MR: Ch'oe Suin

Choi Soo-in (Korean: 최수인; born March 5, 2004) is a South Korean actress. She first came to the attention of the public with her debut role in the 2016 film The World of Us, where she plays a lonely and outcast child who tries her utmost to hold onto her first friend.

== Filmography ==
=== Films ===
Film credit
Year	Title	Role	Notes	Ref.
2016	The World of Us	Sun	Debut	
2017	I Can Speak	Na Ok-Boon (young)		
2019	The House of Us	Sun	Cameo	
2024	My Best, Your Least	Yu-mi		
2025	The Gorals	Su-min		

=== Series ===
Series credit
Year	Title	Role	Notes	Ref.
2022–2023	The Glory	Lee Seon-ah	Part 1–2	

== Awards and nominations ==
Year	Award	Category	Nominated work	Result
2016	25th Buil Film Awards	Best New Actress	The World of Us	Nominated
2016	6th Shanghai International Film Festival	Best Actress	The World of Us	Nominated
2016	56th Zlín Film Festival	Best Child Actor in Feature Film for Children	The World of Us	Won
2017	4th Wildflower Film Awards	Best New Actress	The World of Us	Nominated
2017	53rd Baeksang Arts Awards	Best New Actress	The World of Us	Nominated
2017	22nd Chunsa Film Art Awards	Best New Actress	The World of Us	Nominated
