= The World of Us =

- Theatrical release poster
- Hangul: 우리들
- RR: Urideul
- MR: Uridŭl
- Directed by: Yoon Ga-eun
- Written by: Yoon Ga-eun
- Produced by: Kim Soon-mo; Kim Ji-hye
- Starring: Choi Soo-in; Seol Hye-in; Lee Seo-yeon
- Cinematography: Min Jun-won; Kim Ji-hyun
- Edited by: Park Se-young
- Music by: Yeon Ri-mok
- Distributed by: Atnine Film
- Release dates: February 14, 2016 (Berlinale); June 16, 2016 (South Korea)
- Running time: 94 minutes
- Country: South Korea
- Language: Korean
- Box office: US$325,870

The World of Us (Korean: 우리들; RR: Urideul) is a 2016 South Korean drama film written and directed by Yoon Ga-eun in her feature-length directorial debut. The film was released in South Korea on June 16, 2016.

== Premise ==
Sun (Choi Soo-in), an elementary school girl and social outcast, befriends transfer student Jia (Seol Hye-in) during summer vacation. When the fall semester begins, their new friendship is put to the test as both are subject to bullying and internal problems. Can they overcome their boundaries?

== Cast ==
- Choi Soo-in as Sun
- Seol Hye-in as Ji-ah
- Lee Seo-yeon as Bo-ra
- Kang Min-joon as Yoon
- Kim Hee-joon as Eun-joo
- Kim Chae-yeon as Tae-yeon
- Jang Hye-jin as Mom
- Son Suk-bae as Dad

== Release ==
On June 16, 2016, it was released on 136 screens in Korea through Ato Film. In Japan, it was opened in 30 halls, starting with S&B Garden Cinema on September 23, 2017.

=== Home media ===
The World of Us was released on DVD on February 16, 2017. Afterwards, on December 20, 2018, a Blu-ray disc composed of two discs was released through an android. DVDs and Blu-ray Discs include commentaries and supplementary videos.

== Reception ==
=== Box office ===
As of April 19, 2021, it recorded 51,008 audiences and 378,320,114 won in sales.

=== Accolades ===
| Award ceremony | Category | Recipients | Result |
|---|---|---|---|
| 34th Ale Kino! International Young Audience Film Festival | Golden Goat for Best Feature Film for Children | The World of Us | Won |
| 10th Asia Pacific Screen Awards | Best Youth Feature Film | The World of Us | Won |
| 37th Blue Dragon Film Awards | Best New Director | Yoon Ga-eun | Won |
| 25th Buil Film Awards | Best New Actress | Choi Soo-in | Nominated |
| 25th Buil Film Awards | Best New Director | Yoon Ga-eun | Won |
| 25th Buil Film Awards | Best Screenplay | Yoon Ga-eun | Nominated |
| 8th KOFRA Film Awards | Best Independent Film | The World of Us | Won |
| 36th Korean Association of Film Critics Awards | Best New Director | Yoon Ga-eun | Won |
| 36th Korean Association of Film Critics Awards | Top Films of the Year | The World of Us | Won |
| 16th Korea Assembly Grand Awards | Outstanding Film | The World of Us | Won |
| 2016 Tokyo Filmex | Audience Award | The World of Us | Won |
| 2016 Tokyo Filmex | Jury Special Mention | Yoon Ga-eun | Won |
| 17th Women in Film Korea Festival | Best Director | Yoon Ga-eun | Won |
| Shanghai International Film Festival | Best Actress | Choi Soo-in | Nominated |
| Shanghai International Film Festival | Best Cinematography | Min Jun-won, Kim Ji-hyun | Nominated |
| 56th Zlín Film Festival | Best Feature Film for Children | The World of Us | Won |
| 56th Zlín Film Festival | Best Child Actor in Feature Film for Children | Choi Soo-in | Won |
| 4th Wildflower Film Awards | Grand Prize | The World of Us | Won |
| 4th Wildflower Film Awards | Best Director – Narrative Films | Yoon Ga-eun | Nominated |
| 4th Wildflower Film Awards | Best New Director – Narrative Films | Yoon Ga-eun | Nominated |
| 4th Wildflower Film Awards | Best New Actor / Actress | Choi Soo-in | Nominated |
| 4th Wildflower Film Awards | Best New Actor / Actress | Seol Hye-in | Nominated |
| 4th Wildflower Film Awards | Best Screenplay | Yoon Ga-eun | Nominated |
| 16th National Assembly of Korea Awards | Film (Arts) Category | The World of Us | Won |
| 53rd Baeksang Arts Awards | Best New Actress | Choi Soo-in | Nominated |
| 53rd Baeksang Arts Awards | Best New Director | Yoon Ga-eun | Nominated |
| 53rd Baeksang Arts Awards | Best Screenplay | Yoon Ga-eun | Won |
