= 37th Blue Dragon Film Awards =

2016 edition of award ceremony

- Date: November 25, 2016
- Site: Kyung Hee University's Peace Palace Hall, Seoul
- Hosted by: Kim Hye-soo; Yoo Jun-sang

Television coverage
- Network: SBS
- Duration: 120 minutes

The 37th Blue Dragon Film Awards ceremony was held on November 25, 2016 at Kyung Hee University's Peace Palace Hall in Seoul. It was live broadcast on SBS and hosted by Kim Hye-soo and Yoo Jun-sang.

== Nominations and winners ==
Complete list of nominees and winners

(Winners denoted in bold)

Best Film	Best Director
**Inside Men**; The Age of Shadows; Dongju: The Portrait of a Poet; The Handmaiden; Train to Busan; The Wailing	**Na Hong-jin** - **The Wailing**; Kim Jee-woon - The Age of Shadows; Lee Joon-ik - Dongju: The Portrait of a Poet; Park Chan-wook - The Handmaiden; Woo Min-ho - Inside Men
Best Actor	Best Actress
**Lee Byung-hun** - **Inside Men**; Ha Jung-woo - The Tunnel; Jung Woo-sung - Asura: The City of Madness; Kwak Do-won - The Wailing; Song Kang-ho - The Age of Shadows	**Kim Min-hee** - **The Handmaiden**; Han Ye-ri - Worst Woman; Kim Hye-soo - Familyhood; Son Ye-jin - The Last Princess; Youn Yuh-jung - The Bacchus Lady
Best Supporting Actor	Best Supporting Actress
**Jun Kunimura** - **The Wailing**; Kim Eui-sung - Train to Busan; Ma Dong-seok - Train to Busan; Oh Dal-su - The Tunnel; Uhm Tae-goo - The Age of Shadows	**Park So-dam** - **The Priests**; Bae Doona - The Tunnel; Chun Woo-hee - The Wailing; Jung Yu-mi - Train to Busan; Ra Mi-ran - The Last Princess
Best New Actor	Best New Actress
**Park Jung-min** - **Dongju: The Portrait of a Poet**; Ji Soo - One Way Trip; Jo Woo-jin - Inside Men; Lee Won-keun - The Net; Lee Sang-yoon - Insane	**Kim Tae-ri - The Handmaiden**; Jeong Ha-dam - Steel Flower; Kang Ha-na - Spirits' Homecoming; Kim Hwan-hee - The Wailing; Yoon Joo - A Break Alone
Best New Director	Best Screenplay
**Yoon Ga-eun** - **The World of Us**; Jang Jae-hyun - The Priests; Kim Tae-gon - Familyhood; Lee Il-hyung - A Violent Prosecutor; Yeon Sang-ho - Train to Busan	**Shin Yeon-shick** - **Dongju: The Portrait of a Poet**; Kim Sung-hoon & So Jae-won - The Tunnel; Na Hong-jin - The Wailing; Yeon Sang-ho & Park Joo-seok - Train to Busan; Woo Min-ho - Inside Men
Best Cinematography-Lighting	Best Editing
**Lee Mo-gae & Lee Sung-hwan** - **Asura: The City of Madness**; Jung Jung-hoon & Bae Il-hyuk - The Handmaiden; Hong Kyung-pyo & Kim Chang-ho - The Wailing; Lee Hyung-deok & Park Jeong-woo - Train to Busan; Kim Gi-young & Jo Gyu-young - The Age of Shadows	**Kim Seon-min** - **The Wailing**; Kim Chang-joo - The Tunnel; Kim Sang-beom - Inside Men; Shin Min-kyung - The Priests; Yang Jin-mo - Train to Busan
Best Art Direction	Technical Award
**Ryu Seong-hui** - **The Handmaiden**; Jang Geun-young - Asura: The City of Madness; Jung Yi-jin & Kim Min-hye - The Age of Shadows; Lee Hoo-kyung - The Wailing; Lee Mok-won - Train to Busan	**Kwak Tae-yong & Hwang Hyo-gyun** (Special makeup) - **Train to Busan**; Baek Sang-hoon (Visual effects) - The Priests; Heo Myung-haeng (Martial arts) - Asura: The City of Madness; Jo Sang-kyung (Costumes) - The Handmaiden; Kim Nam-sik (Visual effects) - The Tunnel
Best Music	Popular Star Award
**Jang Young-gyu & Dalparan** - **The Wailing**; Jo Yeong-wook - The Handmaiden; Kim Tae-seong - The Priests; Lee Jae-jin - Asura: The City of Madness; Mowg - The Age of Shadows	**Bae Doona** - **The Tunnel**; **Jung Woo-sung** - **Asura: The City of Madness**; **Jun Kunimura** - **The Wailing**; **Son Ye-jin** - **The Last Princess**
Best Short Film	Audience Choice Award for Most Popular Film
**Summer Night**	**Train to Busan**
