= Yoo Eun-mi =

South Korean actress (born 2004)

- Born: March 9, 2004 (age 22); South Korea
- Occupation: Actress
- Agent: IK Entertainment

Korean name
- Hangul: 유은미
- RR: Yu Eunmi
- MR: Yu Ŭnmi

Yoo Eun-mi (Korean: 유은미; born March 9, 2004) is a South Korean actress. She began her career as a child actress in television dramas such as Jang Bo-ri is Here! (2013) and the film The Fatal Encounter (2014).

== Filmography ==
=== Television series ===
Year	Title	Role
2007	That Woman is Scary	
2008	Daughter-in-Law	Ma Ye-kyung
2013	Jang Bo-ri is Here!	Jang Bo-ri (young)
2014	Lovers of Music	Choi Byul
2015	Blood	Choi Soo-yeon
2017	KBS TV Novel: "A Sea of Her Own"	Yoon Soo-In (young)
2018	Children of Nobody	Lee Bit Na

=== Film ===
Year	Title	Role
2014	The Fatal Encounter	Bok-bing
2017	A Taxi Driver	Eun-jeong
2019	Mal-Mo-E: The Secret Mission	Soon-hee
