= Park Jeong-min (actor) =

South Korean actor (born 1987)

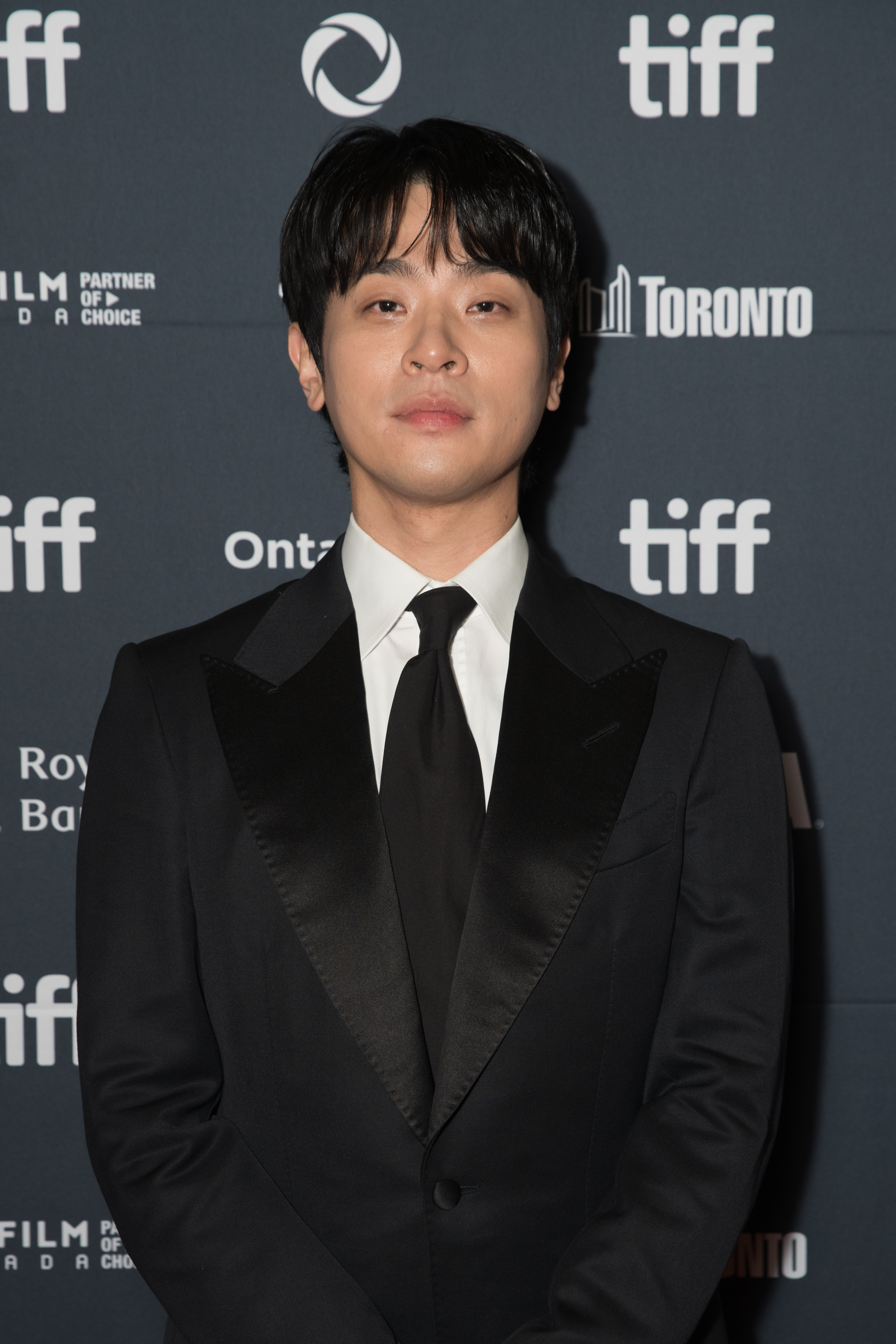
- Park at the 2025 Toronto International Film Festival
- Born: March 24, 1987 (age 39); Chungju, South Korea
- Education: Korea National University of Arts (Film and Acting)
- Occupations: Actor; writer; book publisher; director; scriptwriter
- Years active: 2011–present
- Agent: SEM Company

Korean name
- Hangul: 박정민
- RR: Bak Jeongmin
- MR: Pak Chŏngmin
- Website: semcompany.co.kr

Park Jeong-min (Korean: 박정민; born March 24, 1987) is a South Korean actor, writer, and book publisher. Known as a prolific Chungmu-ro actor, he has starred in films such as Bleak Night (2011), Dongju: The Portrait of a Poet (2016), Keys to the Heart (2018), Deliver Us from Evil (2020), Smugglers (2023), Uprising (2024), Harbin (2024) and The Ugly (2025). He is also the author of the best-selling book A Useful Person.

== Early life and education ==
In 2005, Park enrolled in Liberal Arts at the prestigious Korea University and subsequently dropped out with the intention to become a filmmaker. He then majored in film making at Korea National University of Arts, but later switched his major to acting after his military discharge.

== Career ==
=== 2011–2016: Early work and breakthrough ===
In 2011, Park made his screen debut with the critically acclaimed independent film Bleak Night, for which he was nominated for Best New Actor at the 20th Buil Film Awards.

He started appearing in mainstream films when he scored minor roles in romantic comedy film Dancing Queen (2012), action drama film Fists of Legend (2013) and disaster film The Flu (2013). In 2014, he starred in another Korean Academy of Film Arts graduation project and independent film Tinker Ticker which premiered at the 26th Tokyo International Film Festival.

Park made his breakthrough and rose to prominence in 2016 with his performance in Dongju: The Portrait of a Poet as Song Mong-gyu, a cousin of the poet Yun Dong-ju who was known for his resistance writings during the Japanese occupation of Korea. His portrayal garnered him Best New Actor awards at the 52nd Baeksang Arts Awards, 37th Blue Dragon Film Awards, 36th Golden Cinema Festival, the Korea Film Actors Association Awards, 16th Director's Cut Awards, and a Best Supporting Actor award at the 22nd Chunsa Film Art Awards.

=== 2017–present: Rising popularity and critical acclaim ===
In 2017, Park returned to theater as Romeo in the Korean adaptation of William Shakespeare's Romeo and Juliet with Moon Geun-young playing Juliet.

In 2018, he starred in the comedy-drama film Keys to the Heart as a gifted pianist with autism and savant syndrome. For this role, Park practiced playing the piano for 6 hours a day for 6 months and executed all the piano playing scenes in the film without a substitute. The same year, Park appeared in the superhero film Psychokinesis and headlined Lee Joon-ik's drama film Sunset in My Hometown in which he plays a rapper. With the help of professional rappers, Park practiced rapping for a year, and wrote lyrics for the songs that appeared in the film.

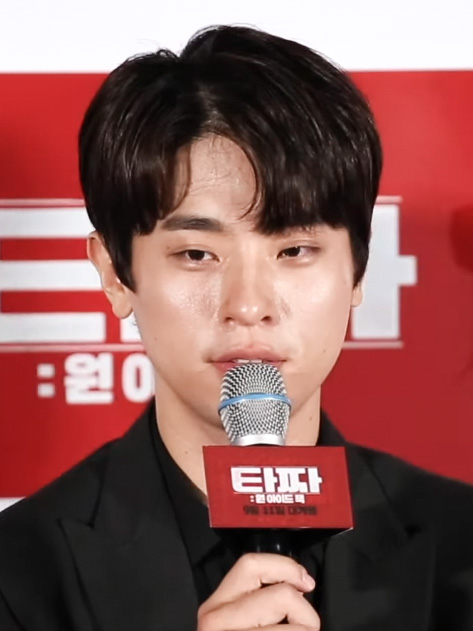
Park in 2019

In 2019, Park starred in occult horror film Svaha: The Sixth Finger and took on lead roles in the crime drama film Tazza: One Eyed Jack as well as the webtoon-based comedy film Start-Up.

In 2020, Park was cast in Netflix original film Time to Hunt which premiered at the 70th Berlin International Film Festival. Later that year, he starred in the action film Deliver Us from Evil where he received widespread critical acclaim for his performance as Yui, a transgender woman who wishes to undergo sex reassignment surgery but cannot afford to do so. The film became the second highest-grossing South Korean film of 2020. For his portrayal, Park received numerous accolades including Best Supporting Actor awards at the 41st Blue Dragon Film Awards, 57th Baeksang Arts Awards, 40th Korean Association of Film Critics Awards, and 26th Chunsa Film Art Awards. He also wrote and directed a music video for "Reconnect" as part of a special project in celebration of Elle Korea's 28th anniversary.

In 2021, Park starred in drama film Miracle: Letters to the President and made his directorial debut with short film Unframed – Class Representative Election which premiered at the 26th Busan International Film Festival alongside Netflix original series Hellbound in which Park made his small screen comeback.

In 2023, he starred in action crime film Smugglers for which he was nominated for Best Supporting Actor at the 60th Baeksang Arts Awards, 44th Blue Dragon Film Awards, 59th Grand Bell Awards, and 32nd Buil Film Awards.

In 2024, Park was cast in another Netflix original series The 8 Show based on the Naver webtoons Money Game and Pie Game by Bae Jin-soo. Later that year, he starred in Netflix original film Uprising which landed him a win and a nomination for Best Supporting Actor at the 34th Buil Film Awards and 61st Baeksang Arts Awards respectively. He then appeared in sports drama film One Win and biographical period film Harbin where he portrayed South Korean independence activist Woo Deok-sun. Harbin topped the South Korean box office for four weeks following its release and garnered Park a Best Supporting Actor nomination at the 46th Blue Dragon Film Awards.

In 2025, he starred in the zombie comedy series Newtopia, marking his third project with director Yoon Sung-hyun. Following the filming of action spy film Humint where he plays the role of a North Korean agent, Park effectively took a hiatus from all acting activities to focus on his book publishing career.

Later that year, Park's first dual role film The Ugly made its premiere at the 2025 Toronto International Film Festival. Due to the film's low-budget nature, it had a three week filming period with 20 crew members and he appeared in the film without receiving an appearance fee. Nevertheless, the film achieved huge commercial success and became the eleventh South Korean film of the year to surpass 1 million admissions. For his leading role in the film, Park received the 62nd Baeksang Arts Award for Best Actor – Film and became the first person in Baeksang Arts Awards history to win every film acting category. He also won Best Actor at the 45th Korean Association of Film Critics Awards and received nominations in the same category at the 46th Blue Dragon Film Awards and the 24th Director's Cut Awards.

Park made his return to theater after eight years in the stage adaptation of Yann Martel's Life of Pi which premiered on December 2, 2025 in Seoul and ended on March 15, 2026 in Busan.

== Other activities ==
=== Writing ===
In 2014, Park became a writer of a monthly column for magazine Topclass and established a following of devoted readers. His column is called "Eonhee", which means "to make others happy through words".

Known for his humorous and self-deprecating writing style, Park published his own book of essays in 2016, titled A Useful Person. The book became a best-seller and had its 12th round of printing as of 2019.

Park also owned a bookstore called Book, Night, Day in Hapjeong-dong, Seoul which opened in 2019.

In 2022, he joined Baedal Minjok's newsletter The Taste of Living These Days as a columnist. In 2024, he was recruited as a contributor to the We Love Poetry newsletter where his self-written poems were published.

=== Book publishing ===
At the end of 2020, Park established Muze, his own book publishing company. He became the editor of the first book published by the company titled Saving Work by journalist Kim So-young, a book which discusses animal rights. Park states that he aims to publish books about the marginalized as well as matters which are disregarded by the society.

In 2025, Park launched the Listening Novel Project with the release of writer Kim Keum-hee's new full-length novel First Summer, Wanju as an audiobook to make literature more accessible to readers with visual impairments. His motivation behind the project arose after his father had lost his eyesight and was unable to enjoy the books published by him.

Park became the executive producer of the audiobook which stars Go Min-si, Yum Jung-ah, Kim Do-hoon, Choi Yang-rak, Kim Eui-sung and many others. Departing from the conventional practice of releasing print editions first, the audiobook version was completed and distributed ahead of the print release. Copies of the audiobook were donated to the National Library for the Disabled and other institutions serving visually impaired communities.

== Filmography ==
Key
†	Denotes films that have not yet been released

=== Film ===
Year	Title	Role	Notes	Ref.
2011	Bleak Night	Baek Hee-joon		
2011	Short! Short! Short! 2010: Fantastic Theater	I-mae	Segment: "The Famished"	
2012	Dancing Queen	Ramyun in package		
2013	Fists of Legend	young Im Deok-kyu		
2013	The Flu	Chul-gyo		
2014	Hot Young Bloods	Hwang-kyu		
2014	Tinker Ticker	Lee Hyo-min		
2014	Mad Sad Bad	Bizen/Bo-hyun	Segment: "Ghost"	
2014	Momo Salon	Chang-gyun		
2015	Heartbreak Hotel	Chen		
2015	Office	Lee Won-suk		
2016	Dongju: The Portrait of a Poet	Song Mong-gyu		
2016	Pure Love	Yong-soo		
2016	Horror Stories 3	Dong-geun	Segment: "Road Rage"	
2017	The King	Heo Ki-hoon		
2017	The Artist: Reborn	Jae-bum		
2017	The King's Case Note	Crown Prince Uikyung	Cameo	
2018	Keys to the Heart	Jin-tae		
2018	Psychokinesis	Kim Jung-hyun		
2018	Sunset in My Hometown	Hak-soo		
2019	Svaha: The Sixth Finger	Na-han		
2019	Tazza: One Eyed Jack	Do Il-chul		
2019	Start-Up	Go Taek-il		
2020	Time to Hunt	Sang-soo		
2020	Deliver Us from Evil	Yui		
2021	Moving On	Narrator	Barrier-free version	
2021	Miracle: Letters to the President	Jung Jun-kyung		
2022	Decision to Leave	San-oh	Cameo	
2022	Another Record: Lee Je-hoon	Himself	Documentary	
2023	One Win	Kang Jeong-won		
2023	Smugglers	Jang Do-ri		
2023	Dr. Cheon and Lost Talisman	Fairy shaman	Cameo	
2024	Uprising	Jong-ryeo		
2024	Harbin	Woo Deok-soon		
2025	Love Untangled	Pedestrian	Cameo	
2025	The Ugly	Im Dong-hwan / young Im Young-gyu	Dual role	
2026	Humint	Park Geon		
TBA	A Mark Against Thee	Choi Yeop		

Short film

Year	Title	Cast	Notes	Ref.
2007	The End of the World	Boy		
2009	Lovers	Ho-young		
2010	Study Group	—N/a		
2011	The Cap of Fools	Park Jeong-min		
2021	Unframed – Class Representative Election	Kim Dam-ho; Kang Ji-seok; Park Hyo-eun; Park Seung-joon	As director and scriptwriter	
2022	Life Is But A Dream	The Swordsman		

=== Television series ===
Year	Title	Role	Notes	Ref.
2011	KBS Drama Special: Human Casino	Cha Tae-oh	One-act drama	
2012	Feast of the Gods	Jang Mi-so		
2012	Golden Time	Jang Young-woo		
2013	Puberty Medley	Shin Young-bok		
2014	You're All Surrounded	Ji Gook		
2014	Righteous Love	Jang Ki-tae		
2015	Reply 1988	Sung Bo-ra's boyfriend	Cameo (episode 8–9)	
2016	Entourage	Lee Ho-jin		
2018	Mr. Sunshine	Ahn Chang-ho	Cameo (episode 22)	
2021	Hellbound	Bae Young-jae		
2022	Shooting Stars	Park Jo-eun	Cameo (episode 1)	
2024	The 8 Show	Yoo Phillip		
2024	Light Shop	Kim Young-tak	Cameo (episode 8)	
2025	Newtopia	Lee Jae-yoon		
2027	A Man's Man	Han Yu Hyeon		

=== Music video appearances ===
Year	Song Title	Artist	Ref.
2012	"Butterfly"	Sunjungsun	
2018	"With the Heart to Forget You"	IU	
2018	"Byunsan Monologue"	Park Jung-min (Feat. Kim Go-eun, Yankee)	
2019	"I'm Always You"	Lee Seung Hwan	
2020	"Reconnect for the Gone"	Code Kunst, Simon Dominic, Choi Jung-hoon	
2022	"Because We Loved"	Kang Min-kyung and Choi Jung-hoon	
2022	"Jotto"	Bibi	
2023	"I Want That"	(G)I-dle	
2024	"Beginning and End"	Park Won	
2024	"Sky, Hands, Balloons"	Cloud koh	
2025	"Good Goodbye"	Hwasa	

== Theater ==
Theater play performances
Year	Title		Role	Venue	Date	Ref.
Year	English	Korean	Role	Venue	Date	Ref.
2011	Kisaragi Miki-chan	키사라기 미키짱	Snake	Culturespace N.U	June 9 – August 7	
2011	Kisaragi Miki-chan	키사라기 미키짱	Snake	Ansan Culture and Arts Center Dalmaji Theater	September 24–25	
2012–2013	Kisaragi Miki-chan	키사라기 미키짱	Snake	Culturespace N.U	November 29 – February 24	
2013	Kisaragi Miki-chan	키사라기 미키짱	Snake	Garden Five Art Hall	April 5–14	
2014	The Escape of G-Code	G코드의 탈출	Man	Theater Lab Hyehwa-dong 1	February 18–23	
2016–2017	Romeo and Juliet	로미오와 줄리엣	Romeo	National Theater Daloreum Theater	December 9–January 13	
2017	Romeo and Juliet	로미오와 줄리엣	Romeo	Gunpo Culture and Arts Center Suri Hall (Grand Performance Hall)	January 21–22	
2017	Romeo and Juliet	로미오와 줄리엣	Romeo	Woosong Arts Center Daejeon	February 4–5	
2017	Romeo and Juliet	로미오와 줄리엣	Romeo	Suseong Artpia Paper Hall Daegu	February 23–24	
2017	Romeo and Juliet	로미오와 줄리엣	Romeo	Andong Culture and Arts Center Woongbu Hall	February 25–26	
2025–2026	Life of Pi	라이프 오브 파이	Pi	GS Arts Center	December 2–March 2	

== Awards and nominations ==
Award	Year	Category	Nominee / Work	Result	Ref.
APAN Star Awards	2022	Excellence Award, Actor in an OTT Drama	Hellbound	Nominated	
Asia Model Awards	2018	Popular Star Award	Park Jeong-min	Won	
Asian Film Awards	2021	Best Supporting Actor	Deliver Us from Evil	Nominated	
Asian Television Awards	2025	Best Actor in a Leading Role	Newtopia	Nominated	
Baeksang Arts Awards	2016	Best New Actor – Film	Dongju: The Portrait of a Poet	Won	
Baeksang Arts Awards	2021	Best Supporting Actor – Film	Deliver Us from Evil	Won	
Baeksang Arts Awards	2024	Best Supporting Actor – Film	Smugglers	Nominated	
Baeksang Arts Awards	2025	Best Supporting Actor – Film	Uprising	Nominated	
Baeksang Arts Awards	2026	Best Actor – Film	The Ugly	Won	
Blue Dragon Film Awards	2016	Best New Actor	Dongju: The Portrait of a Poet	Won	
Blue Dragon Film Awards	2021	Best Supporting Actor	Deliver Us from Evil	Won	
Blue Dragon Film Awards	2023	Best Supporting Actor	Smugglers	Nominated	
Blue Dragon Film Awards	2025	Best Supporting Actor	Harbin	Nominated	
Blue Dragon Film Awards	2025	Best Actor	The Ugly	Nominated	
Buil Film Awards	2011	Best New Actor	Bleak Night	Nominated	
Buil Film Awards	2016	Best New Actor	Dongju: The Portrait of a Poet	Nominated	
Buil Film Awards	2016	Best Supporting Actor	Dongju: The Portrait of a Poet	Nominated	
Buil Film Awards	2020	Best Supporting Actor	Deliver Us from Evil	Nominated	
Buil Film Awards	2023	Best Supporting Actor	Smugglers	Nominated	
Buil Film Awards	2025	Best Supporting Actor	Uprising	Won	
Busan Film Critics Awards	2018	Best Actor	Sunset in My Hometown	Won	
Chunsa Film Art Awards	2017	Best Supporting Actor	Dongju: The Portrait of a Poet	Won	
Chunsa Film Art Awards	2021	Best Supporting Actor	Deliver Us from Evil	Won	
ContentAsia Awards	2025	Best Male Lead in a TV Programme/Series Made in Asia	Newtopia	Nominated	
Director's Cut Awards	2016	Best New Actor	Dongju: The Portrait of a Poet	Won	
Director's Cut Awards	2022	Best Actor (TV Series)	Hellbound	Nominated	
Director's Cut Awards	2026	Best Actor (Film)	The Ugly	Nominated	
Golden Cinema Festival	2016	Best New Actor	Dongju: The Portrait of a Poet	Won	
Grand Bell Awards	2013	Best New Actor	Fists of Legend	Nominated	
Grand Bell Awards	2023	Best Supporting Actor	Smugglers	Nominated	
Korea Film Actors Association Awards	2016	Best New Actor	Dongju: The Portrait of a Poet	Won	
Korean Association of Film Critics Awards	2020	Best Supporting Actor	Deliver Us from Evil	Won	
Korean Association of Film Critics Awards	2025	Best Actor	The Ugly	Won	
Wildflower Film Awards	2017	Best Actor	Dongju: The Portrait of a Poet	Nominated	
