= Mowg (composer) =

South Korean film score composer

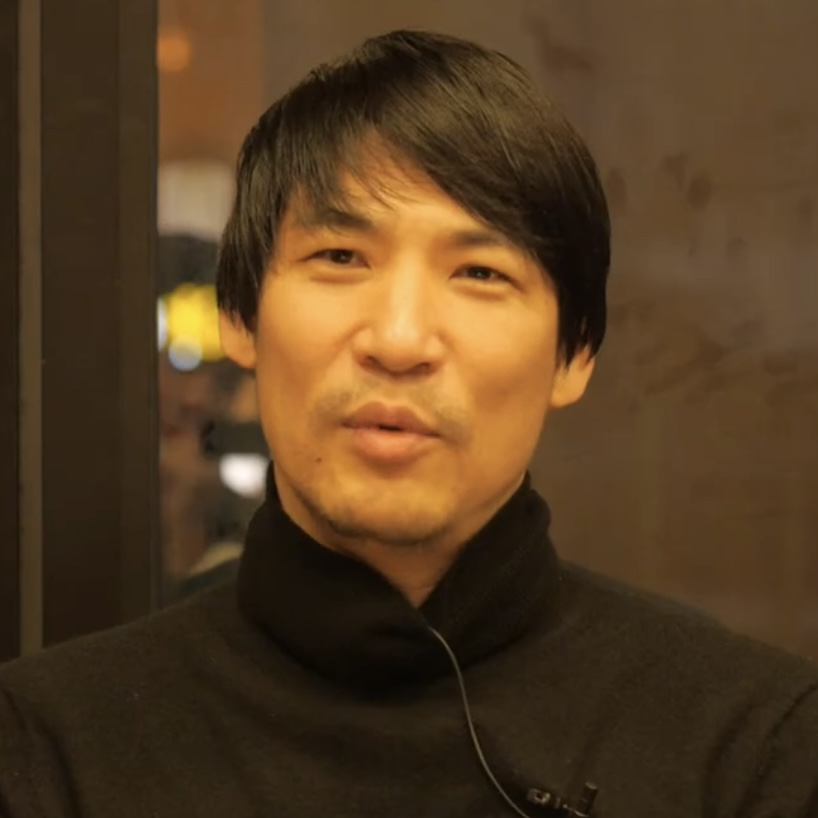
- Born: Lee Sung-hyun; 1972 (age 53–54); South Korea
- Other name: Sung Yi-hyun
- Occupations: Musician, composer
- Years active: 1993–present
- Agent: Esteem Entertainment

Korean name
- Hangul: 이성현
- RR: I Seonghyeon
- MR: I Sŏnghyŏn

Mowg (Korean: 모그), born Lee Sung-hyun (Korean: 이성현, born in 1972), is a South Korean musician and composer of film scores. He adopted the name Mowg after his peers in New York nicknamed him due to his resemblance to Mowgli from The Jungle Book when he was in his 20s.

Mowg is recognized for his frequent collaborations with director Kim Jee-woon, beginning with their first project, the omnibus film Doomsday Book (started in 2006, released in 2012). They have since worked together on several other works, including I Saw the Devil (2010), The Last Stand (2013), One Perfect Day (short film, 2013), The X (short film, 2013), The Age of Shadows (2016), Illang: The Wolf Brigade (2018), Untact (short film, 2020), Dr. Brain (Apple Original Series, 2021), and Cobweb (2023).

Mowg has received multiple awards for his contributions to various films, such as I Saw the Devil (2010), Masquerade (2012), Hwayi: A Monster Boy (2013), Dongju: The Portrait of a Poet (2016), The Age of Shadows (2016) and Burning (2018).

In addition to his film work, Mowg produced albums by other artists, including the debut album by Korean star Jang Yoon-ju titled Dream, and Jazz album of vocalist Malo.

== Early life ==
Lee Sung-hyun started knowing more about music in high school. His parents enrolled him in a piano academy, which ultimately fostered his passion for music. At that time, he liked to watch Saturday Night Movie. That was his first time having interest in film scores. He distinctly remembers two pieces: Joaquín Rodrigo's "Aranjuez Concerto," the signal music for The Masterpiece of Saturday, and Exodus, the theme music of the same program. He also listened to various genres in radio, including jazz, blues, pop, rock, new country, and new wave. He recorded these on cassette tapes and memorized their stories. The music and films he encountered provided him strength during his sensitive adolescence.

Lee's parents weren't supportive of his musical interests. His father, a former rugby player, encouraged him to join the school rugby team, believing it would distract him from music and help him manage his emotions. To build his physique, he was required to eat two slices of tofu each morning and pushed himself to the limit during training sessions. Over time, he developed a rugby player's physique. However, during this period, his personality exhibited contrasting traits, sometimes quiet and withdrawn, at other times outgoing and energetic, reminiscent of manic-depressive tendencies.

By the time he graduated from high school, Lee was immersed in the local jazz scene, performing at "All That Jazz" in Itaewon. Jazz pianist Lee Young-gyeong, a prominent figure at the venue, encouraged him to pursue his musical aspirations in New York. Despite his family's objections, Lee was determined. He stated, "I couldn't live in a system that opposed my love for music. When faced with the choice of giving up on myself or my family, I ultimately chose to leave my family behind." In 1993, he prioritized his passion for music over his family's disapproval and moved to New York.

== Career ==
=== Beginning in New York ===
Lee went to New York after enrolled to an undergraduate school. However difficulty in communicating hindered his adjustment to school. He end up dropping out. There he collaborated with various artists across genres, including jazz, and participated in Broadway shows. Proficient in multiple instruments, such as bass, guitar, keyboard, and drums, living in Harlem exposed Lee to a diverse cultural environment that influenced his music. As a session player and producer, he frequently traveled between Seoul, New York, and Los Angeles. Although Mowg can play several instruments, he is most recognized as a jazz bassist, often playing a 7-string bass, which distinguishes him from the typical 4-string bass players. Fellow musician gave him the nicknamed Mowg due to his resemblance to Mowgli from The Jungle Book.

=== First album ===
In 2004, Mowg released his first bass-only album, titled "Desire," making him the first Korean to release a bass performance album. The album "Desire" consists of two CDs, with all 16 songs being his original works except for two covers: Antonio Carlos Jobim's "How Insensitive" and Jeff Beck's "Cause We've Ended as Lovers." He was praised for his excellent composition skills. He also expanded his musical horizons by performing on stage with Kim Deok-su's Samulnori band and modern dancer Ahn Eun-mi. He won the Best Performance Award at the 2nd Korean Music Awards.

=== Career as film composer ===
Mowg began working in the film industry in 2006 with the anthology film Doomsday Book, which was released in 2011. This three-part anthology was directed by Kim Jee-woon and Yim Pil-sung. Lee received the opportunity from his friend, director Yim Pil-sung, whom he met in Los Angeles in the mid-1990s when Yim was an aspiring director. They connected over their shared passion for film and became friends. Upon returning to Korea, Lee was introduced to several directors by Yim Pil-sung, including director Kim Jee-woon, Bong Joon-ho and Park Chan-wook.

In 2007, Mowg worked with Woody Pak and IAMISEE on the film score for Benson Lee's documentary Planet B-Boy.

In 2009, to celebrate the release of his third album, Nite's Secret, which debuted in April, he held a concert as part of the "Space Sympathy" series. Set in a "modern lounge" atmosphere, Mowg opened with tracks such as "Agent W," "Old Brazilian Jam," and "Gaudi," creating a vibrant mood. He showcased lounge music through several pieces from his album, including "Rodrigo," "Lament," "Suffer," and "Together." A standout moment of the concert was "Can U Hear Me," a tribute to his late grandmother, Ian, who died the previous year. The performance began with her image displayed on a screen. The performance was noted for its lasting impression on the audience. This concert marked Mowg's first domestic performance in three years and was attended by directors Kim Jee-woon and Yim Pil-sung. Additionally, the concert was broadcast on EBS at 12:05 AM on Tuesday, June 16.

Director Kim Jee-woon became one of his most frequent collaborators. They have since worked together on several other works, including I Saw the Devil (2010). In just four years, Lee established himself as a prominent music director in Chungmuro, crediting Kim Jee-woon for helping him grow as a composer.

In 2015, Mowg work with director Yim Pil-sung and choreographer Choi Jin-wook. They adapted the story of 'Red Shoes' to the late Joseon Dynasty. His role was to express the primitive energy of stirring desire through music. As it is a work by the National Dance Company, music with a Korean traditional music feel is inserted, but there is not a single piece of music using Korean traditional instruments. The play is divided into five acts, and the music also accompanies each act with its own breath. To achieve this, the plan is to present minimal music that slightly varies one theme. The music developed by repeating and combining simple motifs and chords, similar to the music of Steve Reich, a representative American minimalist composer.

== Influences, collaborations, and musical philosophy ==
Mowg expresses admiration for several composers, including David Shire, known for his work in Coppola's The Conversation (1974), Saturday Night Fever (1977), and Zodiac (2007). He also appreciates Lalo Shiffrin for his versatility and extensive filmography, as well as Cliff Martinez, a frequent collaborator of Steven Soderbergh. Additionally, Mowg holds Sakamoto Ryuichi and Xavier Jamaux in high regard.

Mowg's initial interest in film music was sparked by Lee Byung-woo, a prominent guitarist and music director in the South Korean film industry. Lee, who was closely associated with director Kim Jee-woon since childhood, influenced Mowg significantly. Through this connection, Mowg learned about Lee's development as a composer, noting his deep knowledge of classical music and musicality. Mowg also admires Shin Byung-ha, a bassist active in many 1970s and 80s films, whom he met through a family friend when he was young.

Director Kim Jee-woon has provided Mowg with substantial guidance, particularly regarding film scoring. Kim often considers how music can enhance a film's mood during production. Their collaboration typically begins with the script, where Kim shares his musical ideas and asks questions about various genres. For example, The Age of Shadows music was inspired by Tinker Tailor Soldier Spy, aiming for a "cool" spy film with cold melodies and harmonies to create a dynamic soundtrack. As Mowg puts it, "Musician acts and music directors react," highlighting the difference between these two roles.

"Musician acts and music directors reacts."

— Mowg about the difference between these two paths, musician and music director

Mowg is known for his ability to handle diverse musical styles, earning consistent praise from collaborating directors and producers. They often remark that "Mowg provides a great deal of inspiration when working on scenarios." Mowg humbly responds, "It's not that grand," attributing his wide range of ideas to his diverse life experiences, which directors find appealing.

Mowg collaborated with Kim Jun-seong on the music for Masquerade. Working with Kim, who has studied classical music since a young age, has also significantly contributed to Mowg's growth as a composer.

For the film Deliver Us from Evil, Mowg drew heavily from 1980s French New Wave films. He incorporated the artificial yet aesthetic approach seen in films like Leos Carax's Boy Meets Girl, Jean-Jacques Beineix's Betty Blue, and Luc Besson's The Big Blue. This stylish work presented a creative challenge but also a valuable opportunity for an experimental project.

Mowg leads Filmuziker, a music team specializing in film scores. The team's motto is: "We must work faster than any other team and produce a significant amount of music." This philosophy stems from Mowg's belief in the power of a strong team. He compares it to baseball: if the opposing team's closer can throw only 20 pitches, his team must be ready to throw 50, focusing on both speed and variety. This competitive approach has earned Mowg the reputation of being "a music director who approaches his work like an athlete." As the team leader at Filmuziker, Mowg works closely with his mentees, music directors Lee Eun-joo and Na-rae.

== Other activity ==
In 2011, Mowg was appointed as a full-time professor in the Department of Applied Music and Arts, specifically the Department of Instrumental Music, at the Seoul Institute of the Arts.

After becoming a film score director, he has been busy and rarely performs as a musician. However, he occasionally appears at film festivals. In 2010, he participated in the congratulatory performance for the Director's Cut Award. In 2015, he performed at the 3rd Muju Mountain Film Festival. In 2015, he performed at the 3rd Muju Mountain Film Festival. In 2019, Mowg's band played the original soundtrack for director Lee Chang-dong's Burning (2018) at the opening ceremony of the 20th Jeonju International Film Festival. In 2021, he took part in Incheon Film Week.

In April 2013, Mowg was appointed as the Public Relations Ambassador for the KT&G Sangsangmadang Music Film Festival. Mowg is also a faculty member of the Jecheon Film Music Academy, a talent development program where participants produce film music through a practical work process and receive one-on-one mentoring from leading music directors in South Korea. This program has been held at the Jecheon International Music & Film Festival since 2006. Alongside Mowg, the faculty includes music directors Shim Hyun-jung, Kim Jun-seong, Han Jae-kwon, Kim Bo-hyeon, Kim Tae-seong, Park Ki-heon, and Choi Won-seop. Director Yoo Young-min oversees the film music division at Netflix.

In 2017, He has been referred to by Sport Chosun as "the greatest star of fusion jazz."

In 2024, Mowg became a composer evaluator for the open recruitment of film projects and composers at the 2024 Jecheon International Music & Film Festival's Music Film Market, celebrating its 20th anniversary. He was part of a judging panel consisting of six experts—three from the film sector and three from the music sector.

Mowg made his directorial debut with his first short film, Force of Love, using the alias Sung Yi-hyun. He also served as the music director for the film. The title is inspired by the love aria sung by the god of love and portrays a comical standoff between two men competing for one woman, with the famous aria "Habanera" from Bizet's opera Carmen as its motif. In a virtual café setting, the three characters in the love triangle are each immersed in their own illusions. Similar to the lyrics of "Habanera," which depict fickle love, the childish power struggle between the two men may reveal the true nature of desire, often disguised as love.

== Filmography ==
=== Feature film ===
Discography in feature films
Year	Title		Ref.
Year	English	Korean	Ref.
2007	Planet B-Boy		
2010	Camelia	카멜리아	
2010	I Saw the Devil	악마를 보았다	
2010	The Influence	인플루언스	
2011	Silenced	도가니	
2012	Masquerade	광해: 왕이 된 남자	
2012	A Company Man	회사원	
2012	Eden	에덴	
2013	Behind the Camera	뒷담화:감독이 미쳤어요	
2013	The Last Stand		
2013	How to Use Guys with Secret Tips	남자사용설명서	
2013	Hwayi: A Monster Boy	화이: 괴물을 삼킨 아이	
2014	Miss Granny	수상한 그녀	
2014	Phantoms of the Archive		
2014	The Fatal Encounter	역린	
2014	Scarlet Innocence	마담 뺑덕	
2014	The Royal Tailor	상의원	
2015	The Avian Kind	조류인간	
2015	Memories of the Sword	협녀, 칼의 기억	
2015	The Advocate: A Missing Body	성난 변호사	
2015	A Dramatic Night	극적인 하룻밤	
2016	The Age of Shadows	밀정	
2016	Don't Forget Me	나를 잊지 말아요	
2016	Like a French Film	프랑스 영화처럼	
2016	Making Family		
2016	Dongju: The Portrait of a Poet	동주	
2016	A Bad Hair Day		
2017	V.I.P.	브이아이피	
2017	The King	더 킹	
2017	Warriors of the Dawn	대립군	
2017	A Day	하루	
2017	The Running Actress	여배우는 오늘도	
2017	The Outlaws	범죄도시	
2017	A Special Lady	미옥	
2017	Romans 8:37	로마서 8:37	
2018	Burning	버닝	
2018	The Witch: Part 1. The Subversion	마녀	
2018	Illang: The Wolf Brigade	인랑	
2018	Monstrum	물괴	
2018	Miss Baek	미쓰백	
2018	My Dream Class		
2018	Intimate Strangers	완벽한 타인	
2018	Unstoppable	성난황소	
2019	Long Live the King	롱 리브 더 킹: 목포 영웅	
2019	Start-Up	시동	
2019	EXIT	엑시트	
2019	Homme Fatale	기방도령	
2019	The Beast	비스트	
2019	Jesters: The Game Changers	광대들: 풍문조작단	
2020	Night in Paradise	낙원의 밤	
2020	Deliver Us from Evil	다만 악에서 구하소서	
2020	Peninsula	반도	
2021	Action Hero	액션히어로	
2021	The Man With High Hopes		
2021	Another Record		
2022	Confession	자백	
2022	The Witch: Part 2. The Other One	마녀 2: the other one	
2022	The Night when The Moon Goes Down	달이 지는 밤	
2023	Soulmate	소울메이트	
2023	The Childe	귀공자	
2023	Ransomed	비공식작전	
2023	Cobweb	거미집	
2024	Dead Man	데드맨	

=== Short films ===
Discography in short films
Year	Title		Ref.
Year	English	Original	Ref.
2009	The Present		
2010	Faces Places		
2010	Cross	Cross, 그녀에게 장미를	
2010	Vertical Limit	세로본능	
2010	A Night on Earth	지상의 밤	
2010	Super Otaku	슈퍼 덕후	
2010	Bang!		
2012	Doomsday Book - "The Heavenly Creature"	인류멸망보고서 - "천상의 피조물"	
2013	One Perfect Day	사랑의 가위바위보	
2013	The X	더 엑스	
2014	Three Charmed Lives; The Killer Behind, the Old Man	세가지 색 - 삼생 킬러 앞에 노인	
2014	The Bicycle Thief	자전거 도둑	
2014	Ghosts of the archive	아카이브의 유령들	
2014	Yeobaewoo	여배우	
2015	Informality	비공식 개강총회	
2015	The Best Director	최고의 감독	
2015	Dancing Cat	고양이춤	
2018	Persona	페르소나	
2020	Untact	언택트	
2020	Live Your Strength	내 물건이 너의 집에 남아있다면 헤어진 게 아니다	
2021	Ground Zero	그라운드 제로	
2023	Faith	페이스	

=== Series ===
Discography in series
Year	Title		Role	Ref.
Year	English	Korean	Role	Ref.
2014	Secret Door	비밀의 문	Score composer	
2016	Entourage	안투라지	Score composer	
2015	Yellow		Score composer	
2021	Dr. Brain	Dr. 브레인	Score composer	
2022	All of Us Are Dead	지금 우리 학교는	Score composer	
2022	Anna	안나	Score composer	
2023	Daily Dose of Sunshine	정신병동에도 아침이 와요	Score composer	
2024	The Tyrant	폭군	Score composer	
TBA	Unfriend †	언프렌디	Score composer	
TBA	Tropical Night †	열대야	Score composer	

=== Albums ===
Albums
Year	Title		Artist	Role	Ref.
Year	English	Korean	Artist	Role	Ref.
2004	Desire	디자이어	Mowg	Bassis	
2005	Trio Romans		Trio Romans	Bassis	
2006	Journal	저널	Mowg	Bassis	
2007	Now, to You	지금, 너에게로	Malo	Producer	
2008	Nite's Secret	정규 앨범	Mowg	Bassis	
2008	Dream	꿈	Jang Yoon-ju	Co-producer	
2010	I Saw the Devil	악마를 보았다	Mowg	Film Composer	
2010	The Influence	인플루언스	Mowg	Film Composer	
2011	Silenced	도가니	Mowg	Film Composer	
2012	Masquerade	광해: 왕이 된 남자	Mowg	Film Composer	
2013	One Perfect Day	사랑의 가위바위보	Mowg	Film Composer	
2013	The Last Stand		Mowg	Film Composer	
2013	Hwayi: A Monster Boy	화이: 괴물을 삼킨 아이	Mowg	Film Composer	
2016	Dongju: The Portrait of a Poet	동주	Mowg	Film Composer	
2018	Burning	버닝	Mowg	Film Composer	

=== Art performance and exhibition ===
Discography in art performance and exhibition
Year	Title		Role	Ref.
Year	English	Korean	Role	Ref.
2015	The Red Dance	적 (赤)	Music director	
2021	Illusion: Between Reality and Fantasy	환영 幻影: 실재와 환상의 사이	sound art	
2024	Penetration	투과 (透過)	sound art	

== Filmography ==
=== Short film ===
Directing credit in short films
Year	Title		Role	Ref.
Year	English	Korean	Role	Ref.
2024	The Power of Love	사랑의 힘	Director	

== Awards and nominations ==
Awards and nominations received by Mowg
Year	Award	Category	Nominee(s)	Result	Ref.
2005	Korean Music Awards	Best Performance of the Year	Desire	Won	
2010	31st Blue Dragon Film Awards	Best Music	I Saw the Devil	Won	
2011	32nd Blue Dragon Film Awards	Best Music	The Crucible	Won	
2012	49th Grand Bell Awards	Best Music (Note: with Kim Jun-seong)	Masquerade	Won	
2012	33rd Blue Dragon Film Awards	Best Music	Masquerade	Nominated	
2012	22nd Buil Film Awards	Best Music	Masquerade	Nominated	
2013	34th Blue Dragon Film Awards	Best Music	Hwayi: A Monster Boy	Won	
2014	23rd Buil Film Awards	Best Music	The Fatal Encounter	Nominated	
2014	23rd Buil Film Awards	Best Music	Miss Granny	Nominated	
2014	51st Grand Bell Awards	Best Music	Miss Granny	Won	
2016	25th Buil Film Awards	Best Music	Dongju: The Portrait of a Poet	Won	
2016	36th Korean Association of Film Critics Awards	Best Music	The Age of Shadows	Won	
2016	3rd Korean Film Producers Association Award	Best Music	The Age of Shadows	Won	
2016	37th Blue Dragon Film Awards	Best Music	The Age of Shadows	Nominated	
2017	Asian Film Awards	Best Composer	The Age of Shadows	Won	
2018	Blue Dragon Film Awards	Best Music	Burning	Nominated	
2018	Buil Film Awards	Best Music	Burning	Won	
2018	Grand Bell Awards	Best Music	Burning	Nominated	
2019	International Cinephile Society	Best Original Score	Burning	Runner-up	
2019	Miami International Film Festival	Alacran Music in Film Award	Burning	Won	
2023	Grand Bell Awards	Best Music	Cobweb	Nominated	
2023	44th Blue Dragon Film Awards	Best Music	Cobweb	Nominated	
2023	10th Korean Film Producers Association Award	Best Music	Cobweb	Won	
2024	Buil Film Awards	Best Music	Cobweb	Won	
