= Deliver Us from Evil (2020 film) =

2020 South Korean action film

- Theatrical release poster
- Hangul: 다만 악에서 구하소서
- RR: Daman ageseo guhasoseo
- MR: Taman agesŏ kuhasosŏ
- Directed by: Hong Won-chan
- Written by: Hong Won-chan
- Produced by: Kim Chul-yong
- Starring: Hwang Jung-min; Lee Jung-jae; Park Jeong-min
- Cinematography: Hong Kyung-pyo
- Edited by: Kim Hyung-joo
- Music by: Mowg
- Production company: Hive Media Corp.
- Distributed by: CJ Entertainment
- Release date: 5 August 2020
- Running time: 108 minutes
- Country: South Korea
- Language: Korean; Japanese; Thai; English
- Budget: $11 million
- Box office: $34 million

Deliver Us from Evil (Korean: 다만 악에서 구하소서; RR: Daman ageseo guhasoseo) is a 2020 South Korean action thriller film written and directed by Hong Won-chan, starring Hwang Jung-min, Lee Jung-jae and Park Jeong-min. The film follows In-nam, a hitman who plans to retire after completing a final hit, but finds himself linked to a kidnapping case in Thailand and targeted by Ray, the man whose sibling he assassinated. The film was shot in Thailand, South Korea and Japan, with almost 80 percent of the filming done in Thailand. It marks the reunion of Hwang and Lee after their 2013 film New World.

Initially scheduled to open in early July, the film was released in South Korean cinemas on 5 August 2020. It was a commercial success, and a final cut with extended footage was released on 28 October 2020. The film was released in the United States in March 2021.

== Plot ==
Hitman In-nam has completed an assignment in Japan, killing a Japanese mobster Koraeda. In Thailand, Young-joo sends her daughter Yoo-min to school and tells her that a babysitter will fetch her after school, as she meets up with real estate agents for an investment in a golf course. Later, as Yoo-min gets down from the school bus, the babysitter takes her to her husband's car and drives away, instead of going home.

Realising that Yoo-min has gone missing, Young-joo reports to the police and contacts Chun-sung to get In-nam for help, which In-nam rejects. The next morning, In-nam receives a message from Chun-sung that Young-joo is dead. Flashback to 8 years ago, it was known that In-nam was part of the National Intelligence Agency, with Chun-sung being his superior, and that Young-joo and In-nam were lovers. In-nam was instructed to leave Korea without her in order to protect her. Present day, In-nam travels to Incheon to see Young-joo's body and subsequently discovers that Yoo-min is his child. After visiting Chun-sung for answers, In-nam receives a call from Shimida that Ray, Koraeda's estranged younger brother, is seeking revenge on the ones involved in the murder of Koraeda. Ray subsequently kills Shimida, then flies to Incheon kills Chun-sung, and finds out that In-nam is headed to Thailand to find the kidnapped Yoo-min. He follows suit.

In Bangkok, In-nam meets Young-bae. The latter briefs about a real estate agent Jong-su, whom Young-joo met before her death, who is a fraudster and has set up the kidnapping of Yoo-min. In-nam finds Jong-su and gets information, then leaves him to die. Meanwhile, Ray kills a gang that lied to him about having captured the babysitter. In-nam finds the babysitter's home and tortures both her and her husband to get information about Yoo-min. Young-bae introduces Yui, a transgender woman, to In-nam for assistance. In-nam and Yui head to a building, then realise that it is a child trafficking operation meant for organ transplants. The two then know that Yoo-min already left the building for Lang Yao, Ratchaburi Province do a heart transplant surgery. Ray arrives in the building, and finally meets In-nam and they fight, with In-nam eventually escaping. Yui and one child from the building also escaped, but are arrested by the police. That night, police raided the building, which belongs to the Thai criminal organisation Chaopo. Chaopo's boss Lan instructs his men to kill In-nam and Yui. In-nam leaves for Lang Yao. Meanwhile, Yui tells the police that In-nam has gone to Lang Yao.

In Lang Yao, In-nam sees Yoo-min being taken away from a football factory for surgery. In-nam gives chase, but Ray intercepts to kill him. The police arrived, and shot both of them. In-nam escapes from the gunfire, kills the surgeons involved before surgery and takes Yoo-min away. Chaopo's operations in Lang Yao are subsequently busted. At night, Ray storms into Lan's home and asks for help to get In-nam. Ray then visits and kills Young-bae.

The next day, In-nam and Yoo-min check in to a hotel, and then he heads out to secure an escape route for the two. Returning to the hotel, he gets ambushed by Chaopo's men. As he makes his way back to the room, Ray and several of Chaopo's men are already inside and Yoo-min is kept in a luggage. Ray kills a few of Chaopo's men, having changed his mind, and tells the remaining men to bring In-nam somewhere else and wait for him, as he plans to settle Yoo-min first. In the car park, Yui sees In-nam being taken into a van, then rams the van with her pickup, and frees him. In-nam gives chase and barges into Ray's car and fights. He detonates a grenade, causing serious injuries to both of them. In-nam frees Yoo-min, when Yui arrives and he tells her to take Yoo-min and run away. He gets brutally stabbed by Ray, but then detonates another grenade inside, killing both.

In-nam left a bag of cash and documents in a locker, which Yui unlocks. He hoped that she would take Yoo-min to Panama in his place in case he got killed. Yui and Yoo-min then left for Panama and settled down there. A photo frame in the Panama house shows a photo of In-nam and a photo of Young-joo and Yoo-min side by side.

== Cast ==
- Hwang Jung-min as Kim In-nam
- Lee Jung-jae as Ray of Sunshine
- Park Jeong-min as Yui
- Choi Hee-seo as Seo Young-joo
- Park So-yi as Yoo-min
- Song Young-chang as Kim Chun-sung
- Lee Seo-hwan as Lee Young-bae
- Oh Dae-hwan Han Jong-su
- Park Myung-hoon as Shimida
- Hakuryu as Interrogator
- Kōsuke Toyohara as Koraeda
- Vithaya Pansringarm as Ran
- Sumet Ongart as Police officer
- Song Yoo-hyun as Korean married couple

== Box office ==
Deliver Us From Evil made $14.9 million over its five-day opening weekend in South Korea. It surpassed 1.5 million ticket sales in four days of its release, and 2 million in its first weekend. On the eighth day of its release, the film passed the 2.5 million viewer mark. In less than a month of its release, the film surpassed 4 million admissions, becoming the second film of the year to do so after The Man Standing Next which was released in January.

== Awards and nominations ==
| Year | Award | Category | Recipient | Result | Ref. |
|---|---|---|---|---|---|
| 2021 | 41st Blue Dragon Film Awards | Best Director | Hong Won-chan | Nominated | |
| 2021 | 41st Blue Dragon Film Awards | Best Leading Actor | Hwang Jung-min | Nominated | |
| 2021 | 41st Blue Dragon Film Awards | Best Leading Actor | Lee Jung-jae | Nominated | |
| 2021 | 41st Blue Dragon Film Awards | Best Supporting Actor | Park Jeong-min | Won | |
| 2021 | 41st Blue Dragon Film Awards | Best Cinematography and Lighting | Hong Kyung-pyo: Cinematography; Bae Il-hyuck: Lighting | Won | |
| 2021 | 41st Blue Dragon Film Awards | Best Editing | Kim Hyung-joo | Nominated | |
| 2021 | 41st Blue Dragon Film Awards | Best Art Direction | Cho Hwa-sung: Production Designer; So Seong-Hyeon: Art Director | Nominated | |
| 2021 | 41st Blue Dragon Film Awards | Best Music | Mowg | Nominated | |
| 2021 | 41st Blue Dragon Film Awards | Technical Award | Lee Gun-moon (Martial arts) | Nominated | |
| 2021 | 57th Baeksang Arts Awards | Best Director | Hong Won-chan | Nominated | |
| 2021 | 57th Baeksang Arts Awards | Best Film | Deliver Us From Evil | Nominated | |
| 2021 | 57th Baeksang Arts Awards | Best Actor | Lee Jung-jae | Nominated | |
| 2021 | 57th Baeksang Arts Awards | Best Supporting Actor | Park Jeong-min | Won | |
| 2021 | 57th Baeksang Arts Awards | Best Technical award | Hong Kyung-pyo | Nominated | |
| 2021 | Chunsa Film Art Awards 2021 | Best Director | Hong Won-chan | Nominated | |
| 2021 | Chunsa Film Art Awards 2021 | Best Actor | Lee Jung-jae | Nominated | |
| 2021 | Chunsa Film Art Awards 2021 | Best Supporting Actor | Park-jeong-min | Won | |
| 2021 | Chunsa Film Art Awards 2021 | Best Technical award | Hong Kyung-pyo | Nominated | |
| 2021 | Chunsa Film Art Awards 2021 | Audience's Most Popular Movie Award | Deliver Us From Evil | Won | |
| 2020 | 29th Buil Film Awards | Best Actor | Hwang Jung-min | Nominated | |
| 2020 | 29th Buil Film Awards | Best Actor | Lee Jung-jae | Nominated | |
| 2020 | 29th Buil Film Awards | Best Supporting Actor | Park Jeong-min | Nominated | |
| 2020 | 29th Buil Film Awards | Best Cinematography | Hong Kyung-pyo | Won | |
| 2020 | 29th Buil Film Awards | Best Art Direction | Lee Geon-moon | Won | |
| 2020 | Korean Association of Film Critics Awards | Best Supporting Actor | Park Jeong-min | Won | |
| 2022 | Director's Cut Awards | Best Director | Hong Won-chan | Nominated | |

== Spin-Off ==
On August 26, 2022, it was announced that Lee Jung-jae would reprise his role in the TV series Ray, which serves as a prequel to the film.
