= The Boys Who Cried Wolf =

- Directed by: Kim Jin-hwang
- Written by: Kim Jin-hwang
- Screenplay by: Kim Jin-hwang
- Produced by: Yu Young-sik; Kim Jin-hwang
- Starring: Park Jong-hwan
- Cinematography: Jeung Jae-a
- Edited by: Kim Jin-hwang; Kim Sun-min
- Music by: Roh Hyung-woo
- Production company: Korean Academy of Film Arts
- Release dates: October 3, 2015 (BIFF); June 2, 2016 (South Korea)
- Running time: 79 minutes
- Country: South Korea
- Language: Korean

The Boys Who Cried Wolf (Korean: 양치기들; RR: Yangchigideul), also known as The Shepherd, is a 2015 South Korean crime thriller drama film. Written and directed by Kim Jin-hwang in his first feature-length for his Korean Academy of Film Arts (KAFA)'s final year undergraduate film project, it depicts how a former stage actor becomes involved in a murder case.

It made its world premiere at the 20th Busan International Film Festival in 2015 and won the DGK Award. It was also invited to the 15th edition of New York Asian Film Festival in 2016 to be screened as the North American premiere.

== Synopsis ==
Wan-joo (Park Jong-hwan), enraged at being replaced by another actor, quits theatre school and now works as a role play in "real-life". One day, a woman asks him to be a witness for her son's murder case. Desperate for money for his mother's surgery, he agrees. When he realizes his false testimony implicates an innocent young man as the murderer, and discovers the murdered victim is an orphan and the woman who hired him isn't who she claims to be, he decides to search for the truth.

== Cast ==
- Park Jong-hwan as Ji Wan-joo
- Cha Rae-hyung as Myung-woo
- Ha Jun as Kwang-suk
- Yoon Jung-il as Young-min
- Kim Ye-eun as Mi-jin
- Oh Chang-kyung as Homicide detective Park
- Ryu Jun-yeol as Dong-chul
- Lee Ga-sub as Joon-ho

== Production ==
The Boys Who Cried Wolf is director Kim Jin-hwang's final year undergraduate film project at the Korean Academy of Film Arts (KAFA). In addition to the original story and directing, Kim also wrote, edited, and co-produced the film.

== Awards and nominations ==
Year	Award	Category	Recipient	Result
2015	20th Busan International Film Festival	DGK Award	The Boys Who Cried Wolf	Won
2016	25th Buil Film Awards	Best New Actor	Park Jong-hwan	Nominated
2016	25th Buil Film Awards	Best New Director	Kim Jin-hwang	Nominated
2017	22nd Chunsa Film Art Awards	Best New Director	Kim Jin-hwang	Won
2017	22nd Chunsa Film Art Awards	Best New Actor	Park Jong-hwan	Nominated
2017	4th Wildflower Film Awards	Best Actor	Park Jong-hwan	Won
2017	4th Wildflower Film Awards	Best Screenplay	Kim Jin-hwang	Won
2017	4th Wildflower Film Awards	Best New Director (Narrative Films)	Kim Jin-hwang	Nominated
