= Dongju: The Portrait of a Poet =

- Theatrical release poster
- Hangul: 동주
- Hanja: 東柱
- RR: Dongju
- MR: Tongju
- Directed by: Lee Joon-ik
- Written by: Shin Yeon-shick
- Produced by: Shin Yeon-shick; Kim Ji-hyung
- Starring: Kang Ha-neul; Park Jeong-min
- Cinematography: Choi Yong-jin
- Edited by: Kim Jung-hoon
- Music by: Mowg
- Release date: February 17, 2016
- Running time: 110 minutes
- Country: South Korea
- Languages: Korean; Japanese
- Budget: ₩500 million (US$378,000)
- Box office: US$7.8 million

Dongju: The Portrait of a Poet (Korean: 동주) is a 2016 South Korean black-and-white biographical period drama film directed by Lee Joon-ik and written by Shin Yeon-shick, starring Kang Ha-neul as the titular character, and Park Jeong-min. It was released in South Korea on February 17, 2016.

== Plot ==
During the Japanese colonial period, when names, language, and dreams were forbidden, Dong-ju and Mong-gyu, cousins of the same age, were born and raised together. Dong-ju, a young man who dreams of becoming a poet, sees Mong-gyu, who acts fearlessly for his beliefs, as both his closest friend and a figure difficult to surpass.

The two leave their chaotic homeland to pursue studies in Japan, which forces them to adopt Japanese names. There, Mong-gyu becomes even more devoted to the independence movement, while Dong-ju continues to write poetry, mourning the tragedy of their times. This deepens the conflict between them, as Mong-gyu is driven by action, while Dong-ju expresses his despair through words.

== Cast ==
- Kang Ha-neul as Yun Dong-ju
- Park Jeong-min as Song Mong-gyu
- Kim In-woo as Detective
- Choi Hee-seo as Kumi
- Shin Yoon-jo as Lee Yeo-jin
- Min Jin-woong as Kang Cheo-Joong
- Choi Hong-Il as Dong-Ju's father
- Lee Bit-na as Yun Dong-Ju's younger sister
- Moon Sung-keun as Jeong Ji-yong

== Reception ==
The film was fifth placed on its opening weekend in South Korea, grossing US$1.14 million.

== Awards and nominations ==
Year	Award	Category	Recipient	Result
2016	52nd Baeksang Arts Awards	Grand Prize (Film)	Dongju: The Portrait of a Poet	Won
2016	52nd Baeksang Arts Awards	Best Film	Dongju: The Portrait of a Poet	Nominated
2016	52nd Baeksang Arts Awards	Best Director (Film)	Lee Joon-ik	Nominated
2016	52nd Baeksang Arts Awards	Best New Actor (Film)	Park Jeong-min	Won
2016	52nd Baeksang Arts Awards	Best Screenplay (Film)	Shin Yeon-shick	Nominated
2016	16th Director's Cut Awards	Best New Actor	Park Jeong-min	Won
2016	16th Director's Cut Awards	Best Production of the Year	Shin Yeon-shick	Won
2016	25th Buil Film Awards	Best Director	Lee Joon-ik	Won
2016	25th Buil Film Awards	Best Actor	Kang Ha-neul	Nominated
2016	25th Buil Film Awards	Best Supporting Actor	Park Jeong-min	Nominated
2016	25th Buil Film Awards	Best New Actor	Park Jeong-min	Nominated
2016	25th Buil Film Awards	Best Screenplay	Shin Yeon-shick	Won
2016	25th Buil Film Awards	Best Music	Mowg	Won
2016	36th Korean Association of Film Critics Awards	Best Screenplay	Shin Yeon-shick	Won
2016	17th Busan Film Critics Awards	Best Screenplay	Shin Yeon-shick	Won
2016	37th Blue Dragon Film Awards	Best Film	Dongju: The Portrait of a Poet	Nominated
2016	37th Blue Dragon Film Awards	Best Director	Lee Joon-ik	Nominated
2016	37th Blue Dragon Film Awards	Best New Actor	Park Jeong-min	Won
2016	37th Blue Dragon Film Awards	Best Screenplay	Shin Yeon-shick	Won
2017	22nd Chunsa Film Awards	Best Supporting Actor	Park Jeong-min	Won
