= Monstrum (film) =

2018 film by Heo Jong-ho

- Theatrical release poster
- Hangul: 물괴
- Hanja: 物怪
- RR: Mulgoe
- MR: Mulgoe
- Directed by: Heo Jong-ho
- Written by: Heo Jong-ho; Heo Dam
- Produced by: Yang Chang-hoon
- Starring: Kim Myung-min; Kim In-kwon; Lee Hye-ri; Choi Woo-shik
- Cinematography: Kim Dong-young
- Edited by: Shin Min-kyung; Jang Rae-won
- Music by: Mowg
- Production companies: Kidari Ent; Taewon Entertainment; Finecut
- Distributed by: Lotte Entertainment
- Release date: September 12, 2018
- Running time: 105 minutes
- Country: South Korea
- Language: Korean
- Box office: US$5.5 million

Monstrum (Korean: 물괴) is a 2018 South Korean period action horror film directed by Heo Jong-ho. It stars Kim Myung-min, Kim In-kwon, Lee Hye-ri and Choi Woo-shik. The film was released on September 12, 2018. It was chosen to compete in the Sitges International Fantastic Film Festival, screening there on 13 October.

== Plot ==
Set in 1527 during King Jungjong's reign where plague is spreading in Joseon and rumors are rife that a mysterious vicious creature called "Monstrum" is roaming around the country.

== Cast ==
- Kim Myung-min as Yun-kyum
- Kim In-kwon as Sung-han
- Lee Hye-ri as Myung
  - Joo Ye-rim as child Myung
- Choi Woo-shik as Hur
- Park Hee-soon as King Jungjong
- Lee Geung-young as Sim Woon
- Park Sung-woong as Jin-yong
- Lee Kyu-bok as Mo-gae
- Kim Min-seok
- Hong Ji-yoon as Mother
- Lee Do-kyung
- Han So-yeong
- Soo Mi

== Production ==
Principal photography began on April 10, 2017. Production ended in Yangpyeong County of Gyeonggi Province on July 21, 2017. Filming took place in various locations such as Paju, Yangju, Gwangju City and South Gyeongsang Province.

== Release ==
The film was released domestically on September 12, 2018, on 1,183 screens. The film received age 15-rating for violence, bloody images, and some frightening sequences. The film was set to be released in VOD service and digital download on October 8, 2018.

== Reception ==
=== Critical response ===
Shim Sun-ah from Yonhap News Agency gave a mixed review and wrote, "Monstrum is the first creature action movie set in the Joseon era and has a suspenseful and entertaining premise, but it is ruined by a predictable plot. One highlight of this film is the design of the monster and splashy special effects. On another positive note, the movie constantly arouses the curiosity of viewers regarding the identity of the strange monster recorded in history, the secret behind the creature and, most importantly, whether the creature's existence is true or not."

At the 2018 Sitges International Fantastic Film Festival, the film won the Panorama Fantàstic Audience Award.

=== Box office ===
The film finished first place on its opening day, attracting 105,255 moviegoers with US$750,819 gross, placing Searching and new release The Predator on the second and third place respectively. The film continued to top the box office on its second day of release. However, the film dropped to second place during the weekend, tailing Searching on the lead by attracted 421,479 moviegoers with US$3.3 million gross.

As of October 4, 2018, the film earned US$5.5 million from 720,721 total attendance.
