= Keys to the Heart =

2018 South Korean comedy-drama film by Choi Sung-hyun

- Theatrical release poster
- Hangul: 그것만이 내 세상
- RR: Geugeonmani nae sesang
- MR: Kŭgŏnmani nae sesang
- Directed by: Choi Sung-hyun
- Written by: Choi Sung-hyun
- Produced by: Ju Seoung-hwan; Yoon Je-kyoon
- Starring: Lee Byung-hun; Youn Yuh-jung; Park Jeong-min
- Cinematography: Hong Seung-hyuk; Kim Tae-sung
- Edited by: Kim Sun-min
- Music by: Hwang Sang-jun
- Production company: JK Film
- Distributed by: CJ E&M
- Release date: January 17, 2018
- Running time: 120 minutes
- Country: South Korea
- Language: Korean
- Box office: US$25.8 million

Keys to the Heart (Korean: 그것만이 내 세상) is a 2018 South Korean comedy-drama film directed by Choi Sung-hyun. The film stars Lee Byung-hun, Youn Yuh-jung and Park Jeong-min. The English translation of the original film title is That's my World.

== Plot ==
The film follows the emotional journey of two estranged brothers as they reconnect and find healing through music and family.

The story centers on Jo-ha (played by Lee Byung-hun), a washed-up boxer who has spent most of his life on the fringes of society. Down on his luck and with nowhere to go, Jo-ha reconnects with his long-estranged mother In-sook (Youn Yuh-jung), whom he has not seen in over a decade. To his surprise, she is now caring for Jin-tae (Park Jung-min), his younger half-brother, who has savant syndrome and is a gifted pianist with an extraordinary musical talent but limited ability to navigate the world on his own.

Forced to live under the same roof, Jo-ha initially struggles to adapt to his new environment and feels awkward around his intellectually disabled brother. However, as time passes, he begins to soften and form a bond with Jin-tae, discovering both the pain and beauty of family connections he had long rejected. As Jo-ha confronts his own failures and lost dreams, he becomes inspired by Jin-tae’s innocence, resilience and musical passion.

== Cast ==
- Lee Byung-hun as Jo-ha
  - Park Sang-hoon as young Jo-ha
- Youn Yuh-jung as In-sook
- Park Jeong-min as Jin-tae
- Han Ji-min as Han Ga Yool
- Choi Ri as Soo-jeong
- Hwang Seok-jeong as Department Head Kang
- Jo Kwan-woo as Moon Seong-gi
- Oh Hye-won as Bok-ja's entourage
- Baek Hyun-jin as Dong-soo
- Moon Sook as Bok-Ja (Special Appearance)
- Kim Sung-ryung as Madam Hong (Special Appearance)

== Production ==
Principal photography began on June 6, 2017, and ended on August 27, 2017.

== Reception ==
=== Critical reception ===
The film explored themes of forgiveness, reconciliation and the power of family, using heartfelt performances and moments of humor to tell a moving story about second chances. With a strong emotional core and standout performances, especially from Park Jung-min as Jin-tae, the film was well received for its sincere portrayal of disability and familial love. It became a moderate box office success in South Korea and contributed to ongoing conversations about neurodiversity in mainstream cinema.

Yoon Min-sik of The Korea Herald called the characters and plot "generic and predictable" but praised the acting performance of the film.

Shim Sun-ah of Yonhap News Agency praised Choi Seong-hyeon for handling family relationships with the utmost sensitivity and drawing good performances out of his actors.

=== Box office ===
According to figures provided by the Korean Film Council, just 3 weeks after its release, the film had surpassed 3 million viewers.

== Awards and nominations ==
Awards	Category	Recipient	Result	Ref.
2nd The Seoul Awards	Best Actor	Lee Byung-hun	Nominated	
2nd The Seoul Awards	Best Supporting Actress	Kim Sung-ryung	Nominated	

== Music pieces ==
The following music pieces appeared in the film:

- Mozart Piano Sonata No.11 in A major 'Rondo Alla Turca' K.331
- Beethoven Piano sonata No.14 in C sharp minor 'Moonlight' Op.27-2 3rd Movement
- Chopin Piano Concerto No.1 in E minor Op.11 3rd Movement
- Brahms Hungarian Dance No.5 in G minor
- Tchaikovsky : Piano Concerto No. 1 in B flat minor, Op. 23

== Remake ==
Philippine adaptation of the film was released in October 2023, Netflix.
