= Lee Joon-ik =

South Korean filmmaker (born 1959)

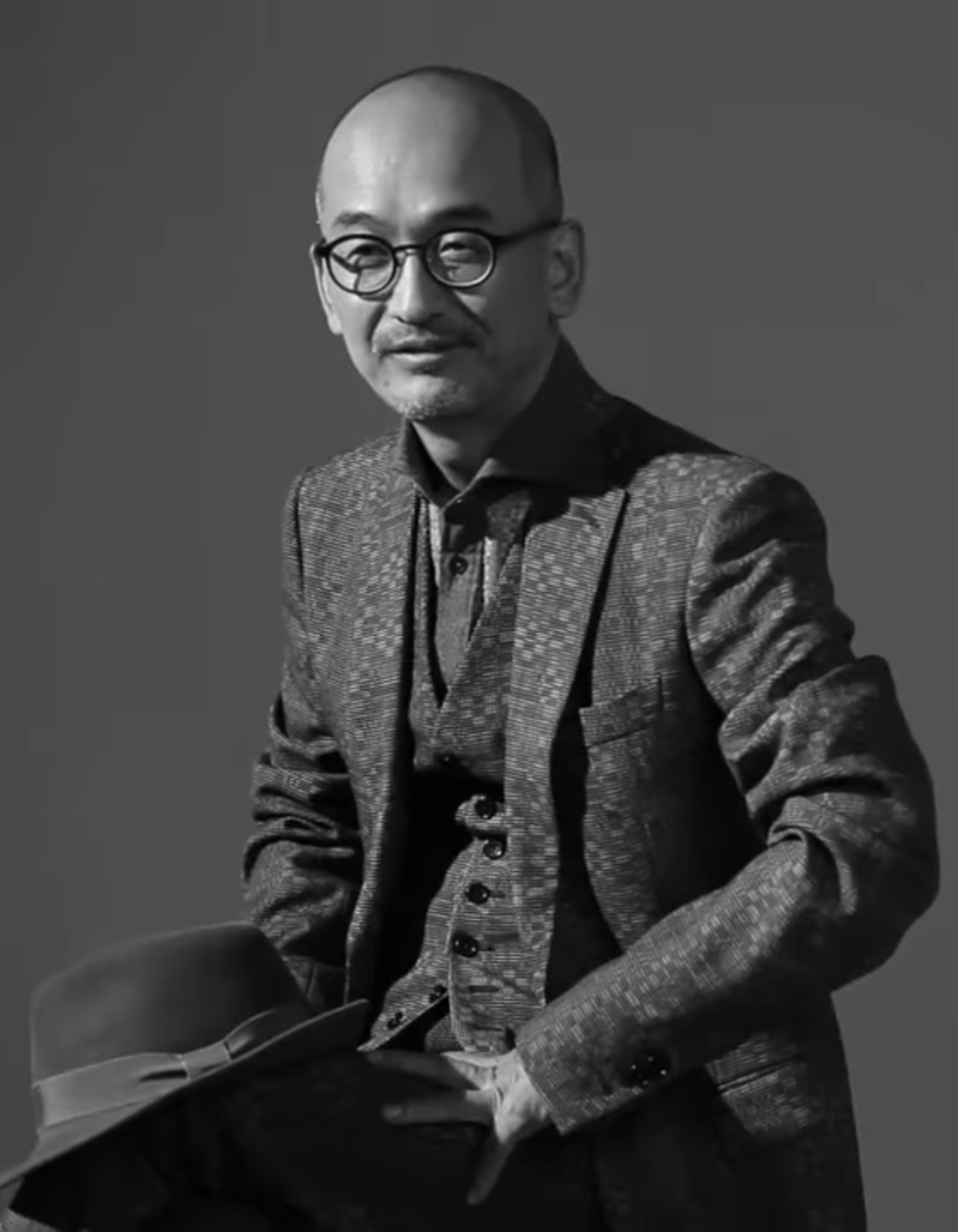
- Lee in 2013
- Born: September 21, 1959 (age 66); Seoul, South Korea
- Education: Sejong University - Oriental Painting (dropped out)
- Occupations: Film director, producer
- Years active: 1993–present

Korean name
- Hangul: 이준익
- Hanja: 李濬益
- RR: I Junik
- MR: I Chunik

Lee Joon-ik (born September 21, 1959) is a South Korean film director and producer. He is best known for directing and producing King and the Clown (2005), one of the highest grossing Korean films of all time. Other notable films include Sunny (2008), Hope (2013), The Throne (2015), Dongju: The Portrait of a Poet (2016), and The Book of Fish (2021).

== Life and career ==
Lee wanted to become a painter and wanted to attend an art school but he got married and had two children in his early twenties, thus he had to give up his dreams. He worked in the film industry, produced and distributed films before becoming a director himself. In an interview, he noted he does not have any formal education in the area, nor did he ever work as an assistant director before.

His movies often feature slang-based humour and political satire, simple but sincere plots and heartfelt stories.

== Filmography ==
=== Film ===
Year	Title	Credited as	
Year	Title	Director	Producer
1993	Kid Cop	Yes	No
1999	The Spy	No	Yes
2000	Anarchists	No	Yes
2000	Ghost Taxi	No	Yes
2001	Hi! Dharma!	No	Yes
2003	Once Upon a Time in a Battlefield	Yes	Yes
2004	Hi! Dharma! 2: Showdown in Seoul	No	Yes
2005	King and the Clown	Yes	Yes
2006	Radio Star	Yes	Yes
2006	Love Phobia	No	Yes
2007	The Happy Life	Yes	No
2007	Shadows in the Palace	No	Yes
2008	Sunny	Yes	No
2010	Blades of Blood	Yes	No
2011	Battlefield Heroes	Yes	No
2013	Hope	Yes	No
2015	The Throne	Yes	No
2016	Mood of the Day	No	Yes
2016	Dongju: The Portrait of a Poet	Yes	No
2017	Anarchist from Colony	Yes	No
2018	Sunset in My Hometown	Yes	No
2021	The Book of Fish	Yes	No

=== Television ===
Year	Title	Credited as	
Year	Title	Director	Producer
2022	Yonder	Yes	No

== Awards and nominations ==
Source for awards listed: IMDb

Award	Year	Category	Work	Result
Asian Film Awards	2021	Best Director	The Book of Fish	Nominated
Baeksang Arts Awards	2009	Best Director – Film	Sunny	Nominated
Baeksang Arts Awards	2014	Best Director – Film	Hope	Nominated
Baeksang Arts Awards	2016	Best Director – Film	Dongju: The Portrait of a Poet	Nominated
Baeksang Arts Awards	2016	Grand Prize – Film	The Throne, Dongju: The Portrait of a Poet	Won
Baeksang Arts Awards	2021	Grand Prize – Film	The Book of Fish	Won
Baeksang Arts Awards	2021	Best Director – Film	The Book of Fish	Nominated
Blue Dragon Film Awards	2006	Best Director	King and the Clown	Nominated
Blue Dragon Film Awards	2013	Best Director	Hope	Nominated
Blue Dragon Film Awards	2015	Best Director	The Throne	Nominated
Blue Dragon Film Awards	2016	Best Director	Dongju: The Portrait of a Poet	Nominated
Blue Dragon Film Awards	2017	Best Director	Anarchist from Colony	Nominated
Blue Dragon Film Awards	2021	Best Director	The Book of Fish	Nominated
Buil Film Awards	2016	Best Director	Dongju: The Portrait of a Poet	Won
Buil Film Awards	2017	Best Director	Anarchist from Colony	Nominated
Buil Film Awards	2021	Best Director	The Book of Fish	Nominated
Chunsa Film Art Awards	2016	Best Director	The Throne	Nominated
Chunsa Film Art Awards	2017	Best Director	Dongju: The Portrait of a Poet	Nominated
Chunsa Film Art Awards	2018	Best Director	Anarchist from Colony	Nominated
Chunsa Film Art Awards	2021	Best Director	The Book of Fish	Nominated
Grand Bell Awards	2006	Best Director	King and the Clown	Won
Grand Bell Awards	2008	Best Director	The Happy Life	Nominated
Grand Bell Awards	2014	Best Director	Hope	Nominated
Grand Bell Awards	2015	Best Director	The Throne	Nominated
Grand Bell Awards	2017	Best Director	Anarchist from Colony	Won
Korean Association of Film Critics Awards	2015	Best Director	The Throne	Nominated
Korean Association of Film Critics Awards	2015	Best Film	The Throne	Won
Korean Association of Film Critics Awards	2016	FIPRESCI Award	Dongju: The Portrait of a Poet	Won
Max Movie Award	2015	Best Film	King and the Clown	Won
