= JTBC Drama Festa =

2017 South Korean television series

- Hangul: JTBC 드라마페스타
- RR: JTBC deurama peseuta
- MR: JTBC tŭrama p'esŭt'a
- Genre: Drama
- Country of origin: South Korea
- Original language: Korean
- No. of episodes: 38

Production
- Executive producer: Park Joon-seo
- Camera setup: Single-camera
- Production company: Drama House Studio (in partnership with some other production companies)

Original release
- Network: JTBC
- Release: October 2, 2017 – present

JTBC Drama Festa (Korean: JTBC 드라마페스타) is a one-act play TV series that airs on JTBC, a South Korean subscription television network.

== List of dramas ==
Title	Broadcast date	Cast	Writers	Directors	Average audience share (Note: This drama airs on a cable channel/pay TV which normally has a relatively smaller audience compared to free-to-air TV/public broadcasters (KBS, SBS, MBC and EBS).)	Notes	Ref.
Someone Noticeable	October 2, 2017	Choi Soo-young, Lee Won-keun, Shin Hee-seon, Jeon Hye-jin	Yoom In-na	Im Hyun-wook	1.231%	10 episodes; Originally a web series	
Hip Hop Teacher	October 3, 2017	Lee Joo-young, Yura, Ahn Woo-yeon, Zizo, Son Jong-hak, Moon Hee-kyung	Kim Ah-ro-mi, Lee Jung-seok	Shim Na-yeon	1.129%	10 episodes; Originally a web series	
Somehow 18	October 8, 2017	Choi Min-ho, Lee Yu-bi, Kim Bo-mi, Kim Hee-chan, Yoo Joon-hong	Yoo Soo-ji	Kim Do-hyung	0.954%	10 episodes; Originally a web series	
Han Yeo-reum's Memory	December 31, 2017	Choi Kang-hee, Lee Joon-hyuk, Tae In-ho, Lee Jae-won, Choi Jae-woong, Choi Yoo-song, Heo Young-ji, Yoon Jin-yi	Han Ki-ram	Shim Na-yeon	1.816%	2 episodes; Co-produced with Signal Entertainment Group and AM Studio.	
Ping Pong Ball	September 17–18, 2018	Yoo Jae-myung, Ji Soo, Choi Kwang-il, Lee Hyun-kyoon, Seo Dong-kap, Na Hae-ryung	Park Ji-won	Kim Sang-ho	1.292%	2 episodes; Based on the Daum webtoon by Jo Geum-san.	
Human Luwak	December 30, 2019	Ahn Nae-sang, Kim Mi-soo, Jang Hye-jin, Choi Deok-moon, Yoon Kyung-ho	Lee Bo-ram	Ra Ha-na	1.701%	2 episodes; Based on the short story of the same name by Kang Han-bit.	
Hello Dracula	February 17–18, 2020	Seohyun, Lee Ji-hyun, Lee Joo-bin, Oh Man-seok, Ji Il-joo, Lee Chung-ah, Go Na-hee, Seo Eun-yool	Ha Jung-yoon	Kim Da-ye	1.062%	2 episodes	
Recipe for Happiness	May 18–19, 2020	Gong Myung, Park So-jin	Yoo So-won	Yoon Jae-won	1.248%	2 episodes; Originally released as a 92-minute film on June 29, 2019.	
Off the Course	2021	Nam Ji-hyun, Park Ji-young, Kim Bum-soo	Jang Ji-yeon	Choi Yi-so		2 episodes	
Missing Child	2021	Park Hyuk-kwon, Oh Ja-hoon	Jo Yoong-won	Kim Bo-ra		1 episodes; Based on the novel of the same name.	

== See also ==
- Drama Special
- Drama Stage
