= Cheer Up! (TV series) =

2015 South Korean television series

- Promotional poster
- Also known as: Sassy, Go Go
- Genre: Teen; Romance; Drama
- Created by: Hwang Eui-kyung (KBS)
- Written by: Yoon Soo-jung
- Directed by: Lee Eun-jin
- Starring: Jung Eun-ji; Lee Won-keun; Chae Soo-bin; Cha Hak-yeon; Ji Soo; Chae Soo-bin
- Country of origin: South Korea
- Original language: Korean
- No. of seasons: 1
- No. of episodes: 12

Production
- Executive producer: Jung Hae-ryong (KBS)
- Producers: Cha Young-hoon; Park Woo-ram; Choi Kwan-yong; Hwang Chang-woo
- Production companies: Cheer Up SPC; Content K

Original release
- Network: KBS
- Release: October 5 – November 10, 2015

Cheer Up! (Korean: 발칙하게 고고; RR: Balchikhage gogo; lit. 'Sassy, Go Go') is a 2015 South Korean television series starring Jung Eun-ji, Lee Won-keun, Cha Hak-yeon, Ji Soo and Chae Soo-bin. It aired from October 5, 2015 until November 10, 2015 on KBS2 every Monday and Tuesday at 22:00 KST for 12 episodes.

== Synopsis ==
Set at the elite Sevit High School in Seoul, the drama follows the lives of five students as they attempt to survive in a vicious environment where academic elitism takes place. Kang Yeon-doo (Jung Eun-ji) is the leader of the outcast street dance club "Real King", a group of students who band together because of their poor academic performance, whereas Kim Yeol (Lee Won-keun) is the President of "Baek Ho", an elite club composed of students from the top 5 percent. When the two clubs are forcibly merged to create a cheerleading squad, the two put their differences aside for the benefit of their clubs. As they go on with their misadventures, many things happen that result in a strong and unbreakable bond. Cheer Up! is a story that aims to show ordinary high school students' misadventures, including love, heartbreak, pain and friendship.

== Cast ==
=== Main ===
- Jung Eun-ji as Kang Yeon-doo

Having positioned 196th out of the 200 students at her school, Yeon-doo is at the bottom of the food chain at her high school, and her only friends are her childhood friend Dong-jae and the members of her street dance club "Real King." She dislikes the arrogant and self-centered students at the top percentiles of the school, namely the members of "Baek Ho," but she becomes friends with them after joining the Cheerleading Club and goes through things with them. She is loyal, sassy, strong-willed, brave and is willing to put herself at risk to fight against the corruption present in her school.

- Lee Won-keun as Kim Yeol

The President of the "Baek Ho" club and the highest ranking student at Sevit, Yeol, is the son of a wealthy father from whom he is estranged. His intelligence also makes him cynical and arrogant. His wit and cleverness allow him to see through the tactics of the scheming adults around him as he exposes them. He begins to like Kang Yeon-doo since she is the person who makes him believe in other people again.

- Chae Soo-bin as Kwon Soo-ah

Ranked second place in school and a member of the "Baek Ho" club, her mother pressures her to become first place in her school and get into an Ivy League university. She is focused solely on succeeding in her academia (this is shown when she joins a cheerleading club as an add-on to her academic profile), but fails to realize the importance of friendship and personal bonds between people. This causes her to become lonely, depressed and isolated, and it eventually leads her to resort to manipulating the people around her in order to live up to her mother's unreachable expectations. She was good friends with Yeon-doo, but after her mother kept pressuring her to be first-ranked, she went against Yeon-doo multiple times. In the end, she realises her mistake and becomes friends with her again.

- Cha Hak-yeon as Ha Dong-jae

Yeon-doo's childhood friend and one of her best friends at Sevit High, Dong-jae is a talented basketball player. Due to a traumatic childhood experience (which involved hurting Yeon-doo), he developed a physical contact phobia. However, after getting kicked out of the basketball team, he joined the cheerleading club as well to accompany Yeon-doo. Although having a childlike mentality, Dong-jae becomes the first person who truly understands Soo-ah's emotional pain.

- Ji Soo as Seo Ha-joon

Although he is in the top 5 percent at his school, Ha-joon has an abusive father who constantly puts pressure on him to do well and resorts to violence when his son is unable to meet his expectations. As a result, he has attempted suicide on more than one occasion. Ha-joon also has anger management issues and considers Kim Yeol his only true friend. He soon considers Yeon-doo a close friend after she helped him. He later develops feelings for her, but in the end, they stay good friends.

=== Supporting ===
==== Students ====
- Kim Min-ho as Min Hyo-sik

A member of "Real King" dance club.

- Shin Jae-ha as Choi Tae-pyung

A member of "Baek Ho" cheerleading club.

- Kang Min-ah as Park Da-mi

A member of "Real King" dance club.

- Park You-na as Kim Kyung-eun

A member of "Real King" dance club.

- Ooon as Joon-soo

A member of "Real King" dance club.

- Jung Hae-na as Han Jae-young

A member of "Baek Ho" cheerleading club.

- Kang Gu-reum as Kim Na-yeon

A member of "Baek Ho" cheerleading club.

- Son Beom-jun as Cha Seung-woo

A member of "Real King" dance club.

==== Faculty ====
- Kim Ji-seok as Yang Tae-bum
- In Gyo-jin as Im Soo-yong
- Park Hae-mi as Principal Choi Kyung-ran
- Lee Mi-do as Nam Jung-a
- Gil Hae-yeon as Director Lee

=== Others ===
- Kim Yeo-jin as Park Sun-young (Yeon Doo's mother)
- Go Soo-hee as Choi Hyun-mi (Soo Ah's mother)
- Choi Deok-moon as Kim Byung-jae (Yeol's father)
- Kim Jae-yong as Hyun-su

== Original soundtrack ==
Cheer Up! OST

Soundtrack album by Various Artists
- Released: November 16, 2015
- Genre: Pop, K-pop, soundtrack
- Label: The Groove Entertainment, Bridge Music, Sony Music Korea

| No. | Title | Artist | Length |
|---|---|---|---|
| 1. | "거북이 날다" ("Turtles Fly") | Jadu | 3:57 |
| 2. | "Shooting Star" | HanByul | 3:44 |
| 3. | "플라플라" ("Flower") | Lizzy (Feat. Kanto) | 3:19 |
| 4. | "반칙이야 너" ("Lovely Girl") | Shin Min-chul (2max) | 2:59 |
| 5. | "Cheer Up" | Oh Hye Ju | 2:18 |
| 6. | "The Sassy Girlz" | Choi Chul Ho | 2:23 |
| 7. | "Hold On There" | Choi Chul Ho | 3:01 |
| 8. | "Sentimental Trumpet" | Choi Chul Ho | 3:26 |
| 9. | "발칙하게 고고" ("Sassy, Go Go") | Choi Chul Ho | 2:28 |
| 10. | "The Operation" | Choi Chul Ho | 2:01 |
| 11. | "Golden Hope" | Choi Chul Ho | 4:51 |
| 12. | "Less Than Nothing" | Oh Hye Ju | 2:39 |
| 13. | "Happy School Days" | Choi Chul Ho | 2:00 |
| 14. | "Real King" | Choi Chul Ho | 1:35 |

== Ratings ==
| Ep. | Broadcast date | Average audience share | | | |
| Ep. | Broadcast date | TNmS | | AGB Nielsen | |
| Ep. | Broadcast date | Nationwide | Seoul | Nationwide | Seoul |
|---|---|---|---|---|---|
| 1 | October 5, 2015 | 3.1% | 3.6% | 2.2% | 2.4% |
| 2 | October 6, 2015 | 4.1% | 4.7% | 3.2% | 3.4% |
| 3 | October 12, 2015 | 3.5% | 3.8% | 3.3% | 3.6% |
| 4 | October 13, 2015 | 4.0% | 4.4% | 3.8% | 3.9% |
| 5 | October 19, 2015 | 4.0% | 4.2% | 2.9% | 2.7% |
| 6 | October 20, 2015 | 4.2% | 4.2% | 3.5% | 3.8% |
| 7 | October 26, 2015 | 4.3% | 4.4% | 4.3% | 4.6% |
| 8 | October 27, 2015 | 4.4% | 4.8% | 3.6% | 3.9% |
| 9 | November 2, 2015 | 4.1% | 4.5% | 3.0% | 3.4% |
| 10 | November 3, 2015 | 4.5% | 4.1% | 3.5% | 3.8% |
| 11 | November 9, 2015 | 3.8% | 4.4% | 3.4% | 3.7% |
| 12 | November 10, 2015 | 4.1% | 4.4% | 4.2% | 4.5% |
| Average | | 4.0% | 4.29% | 3.4% | 3.6% |

== Awards and nominations ==
| Year | Award | Category | Recipient | Result |
|---|---|---|---|---|
| 2015 | 4th APAN Star Awards | Best New Actress | Chae Soo-bin | Won |
| 2015 | KBS Drama Awards | Best Supporting Actor | Kim Ji-seok | Nominated |
| 2015 | KBS Drama Awards | Best Supporting Actress | Lee Mi-do | Nominated |
| 2015 | KBS Drama Awards | Best New Actor | Lee Won-keun | Nominated |
| 2015 | KBS Drama Awards | Best New Actress | Chae Soo-bin | Won |
| 2015 | KBS Drama Awards | Popularity Award, Actor | Lee Won-keun | Nominated |
| 2015 | KBS Drama Awards | Popularity Award, Actress | Jung Eun-ji | Nominated |
| 2015 | KBS Drama Awards | Popularity Award, Actress | Chae Soo-bin | Nominated |
| 2015 | KBS Drama Awards | Best Couple Award | Lee Won-keun and Jung Eun-ji | Nominated |
