= Sunim & Sonim: Soul Trip in India =

2026 South Korean travel variety show

- Hangul: 법륜로드: 스님과 손님
- Lit.: The Way of the Dharma Wheel: Monk and Guest
- RR: Beomnyullodeu: seunimgwa sonnim
- MR: Pŏmnyullodŭ: sŭnimgwa sonnim
- Genre: Travel documentary; Variety show
- Starring: Venerable Pomnyun Sunim; Noh Hong-chul; Lee Sang-yoon; Lee Joo-bin; Lee Ki-taek; Jo Woo-chan
- Country of origin: South Korea
- Original language: Korean
- No. of episodes: 4

Production
- Producer: Jo Moon-joo
- Running time: approx. 100 minutes
- Production company: Prism Studios

Original release
- Network: SBS TV
- Release: May 19, 2026 – present

Sunim & Sonim: Soul Trip in India (Korean: 법륜로드: 스님과 손님)also known as Beopryun Road: The Monk and the Guest or The Way of the Dharma Wheel: Monk and Guest is an ongoing South Korean travel documentary television variety show. Produced under Prism Studios, it is set against the landscape of India. The series premiered on SBS TV on May 19, 2026, and airs every Tuesday at 21:00 (KST).

== Cast ==
- Venerable Pomnyun Sunim
- Noh Hong-chul
- Lee Sang-yoon
- Lee Joo-bin
- Lee Ki-taek
- Jo Woo-chan

== Production ==
=== Casting ===
Venerable Pomnyun Sunim, Noh Hong-chul, Lee Sang-yoon, Lee Joo-bin, Lee Ki-taek, and Jo Woo-chan were confirmed to appear in the program.

=== Development ===
The series was officially commissioned by SBS in April 2026, with Prism Studios managing the production. The press conference was held on 23 April 2026 at the Daeseong Chodang.

=== Filming ===
Pre-production began in March 2026. Principal photography of the variety show commenced and concluded in April 2026. Filming took place across multiple locations, including Kolkata and Bodh Gaya, over a four-day period. Followed by post-production work being completed in May 2026.

== Release ==
The series' first teaser was unveiled on April 30, 2026, and confirmed for a May release. The series premiered on SBS TV on May 19, 2026, and airs every Tuesday at 21:00 (KST). It received mixed reviews from critics. It is also available for streaming on Netflix in selected regions and territories.

== Viewership ==
Within days of its release, the series ranked seventh on Netflix Korea’s Top 10 series chart. By its second week, it rose to fourth place in the same ranking.

Sunim & Sonim: Soul Trip in India : South Korea viewers per episode (thousands)

Season	Episode number										Average
Season	1	2	3	4	5	6	7	8	9	10	Average
1	490	557	397	383	TBD	TBD	TBD	TBD	TBD	TBD	TBD

Source: Audience measurement performed nationwide by Nielsen Korea.

Average TV viewership ratings
Ep.	Original broadcast date	Average audience share	
Ep.	Original broadcast date	(Nielsen Korea)	
Ep.	Original broadcast date	Nationwide	Seoul
1	May 19, 2026	2.6	2.4
2	May 26, 2026	2.7	2.6
3	June 2, 2026	2.2	2.1
4	June 9, 2026	2.3	2.2
5	June 16, 2026		
6	June 23, 2026		
7	June 30, 2026		
8	July 7, 2026		
9	July 14, 2026		
10	July 21, 2026		
Average			
In the table above, the blue numbers represent the lowest ratings and the red numbers represent the highest ratings.
