= KeyEast =

South Korean company

KeyEast Co., Ltd.
- Native name: (주)키이스트
- Formerly: Korea Co., Ltd.
- Company type: Public
- Traded as: KRX: 054780 (November 14, 2003)
- Industry: Entertainment
- Founded: October 8, 1996 (as Tune com Korea Co., Ltd. (한국툰붐 주식회사))
- Founder: Bae Yong-joon
- Successor: Auto Wintech (오토윈테크)
- Headquarters: 5th floor, KeyEast, 96 Road 26, Yeongdong-daero, Gangnam District, Seoul, South Korea
- Area served: Asia; Worldwide
- Key people: Bae Yong-joon (chairman)
- Services: Artist management; Merchandising and licensing; Planning and production of cultural content; Broadcasting; Investment
- Revenue: 20,687,309,140 won (June 30, 2015)
- Operating income: 1,894,744,879 won (June 30, 2015)
- Net income: 1,848,842,998 (June 30, 2015)
- Total equity: 39,802,328,288 won (June 30, 2015)
- Owner: SM Entertainment (33.70%)
- Number of employees: 64 (June 30, 2015)
- Subsidiaries: Content K; Content N; Stream Media Corporation
- Website: keyeast.co.kr

KeyEast (Korean: 키이스트; stylized in all caps) is a management agency founded by actor Bae Yong-joon.

== History ==
In May 2009, KeyEast acquired Japanese company Digital Adventure Inc. (Japanese: 株式会社デジタルアドベンチャー) (TYO: 4772) and made it an affiliated company. After the acquition by SM Entertainment, it was renamed Stream Media Corporation.

In December 2010, KeyEast entered the television production industry through the Korean drama Dream High. Two years later, in 2012, the company entered China.

In March 2022, KeyEast acquired production company Studio flow with a 31.58% stake.

After receiving approval for the merger agreement with Oboi Project Co., Ltd. at the board meeting on August 9, 2022, each company completed the necessary procedures for the merger. At another board meeting the same year on September 14, they resolved the merger completion report general meeting in accordance with Article 526, Paragraph 3 of the Commercial Act with a board of directors resolution and public notice, and therefore the fact of the completion of the merger is reported to each shareholder by public notice.

== Artists ==
=== Actors ===
- Bae Jung-nam (2021–present)
- Cha Seung-won (2025–present)
- Han Hyun-jun (2024–present)
- Jeong Ji-hwan
- Kwon Ji-woo (2022–present)
- Kwon Rowan
- Lee Ki-taek (2025–present)
- Park Myung-hoon (2025–present)
- Park Soo-oh (2025–present)

=== Actresses ===
- Chae Jung-an (2020–present)
- Han Ga-ram
- Jo Hyewon (2025–present)
- Jo Soo-yeon
- Jung Lael (2026–present)
- Kim Hee-ae (2025–present)
- Kim Li-ye (2024–present)
- Kwon Hee-song (2025–present)
- Lee Joo-bin (2025–present)
- Park You-na (2025–present)
- Seo Jeong-yeon (2025–present)
- Stephanie Lee (2024–present)

== Former artists ==
- The Ark (2015–2016)
- Ahn So-hee (2015–2018)
- Bae Noo-ri (until 2017)
- Bong Tae-gyu (until 2014)
- Choi Kang-hee (2007–2014)
- Choi Sung-joon (2018–2024)
- Go Ah-sung (2020–2023)
- Goo Hara (2016–2019)
- Han Bo-reum (20??–2020)
- Han Sung-min (2021–2024)
- Han Sun-hwa (2020–2026)
- Han Ye-seul (2014–2018)
- Hong Ji-yoon (2016–2023)
- Hong Soo-hyun (2007–2019)
- Hwang Se-on (2021–2025)
- Hwang In-youp (2018–2023)
- Im Soo-jung (2011–2015)
- In Gyo-jin (2015–2020)
- Jeong Se-hee (20??–2025)
- Ji Hye-won (20??–2024)
- Ji Hyun-joon
- Ji Soo (2020–2021)
- Jo Bo-ah (2021–2024)
- Jo Woo-ri (2016–2022)
- Ju Ji-hoon (2011–2021)
- Jung Eun-chae (2019–2023)
- Jung Ryeo-won (2012–2020)
- Kang Han-na (2020–2025)
- Kang Ji-young (2019–2022)
- Kim Dong-wook (2016–2025)
- Kim Hee-chan (2014–2022)
- Kim Hyun-joong (2010–2020)
- Kim Jae-chul (20??–2025)
- Kim Min-seo (2010–2014)
- Kim Sae-byuk
- Kim Seo-hyung (2020–2025)
- Kim Si-eun (2016-2023)
- Kim Soo-hyun (2010–2019)
- Ko Sung-hee (2011–2013)
- Kwon Ri-se (2011–2013)
- Lee Bo-young (2009–2011)
- Lee Da-in (2013–2018)
- Lee Dong-ho (20??–2025)
- Lee Dong-hwi (2020–2023)
- Lee Hyun-woo (2011–2019)
- Lee Ji-ah (2007–2011)
- Lee Na-young (2006–2011)
- Lee Tae-vin
- Moon Ga-young (2018–2024)
- Park Eun-bin (2010–2015)
- Park Ha-sun (2019–2024)
- Park Ji-bin (2009–2014)
- Park Jung-yeon (2019–2022)
- Park Seo-joon (2014–2018)
- Park Soo-jin (2014–2024)
- Park Su-bin (2018–2020)
- Seo Hyo-rim (2017–2019)
- Shin Yun-seob
- So Yi-hyun (2010–2020)
- Son Dam-bi (2015–2020)
- Son Hyun-joo (2015–2021)
- Wang Ji-hye (2009–2015)
- Uhm Jung-hwa (2015–2018)
- Uhm Tae-woong (2015–2017)
- Woo Do-hwan (2011–2023)
- Yoo Hae-jin (2021–2023)
- Yoon Bo-ra (2020–2024)
- Yoon Jong-hoon (2021–2025)
- Yoonhan (2015–2016)

== Partnership ==
- JYP Entertainment - Holym (formerly Dream High) (2009–2013, terminated)
- SM Entertainment - Acquisition of KeyEast (2018–present)
