= Lim Hwa-young =

South Korean actress (born 1984)

- 임화영
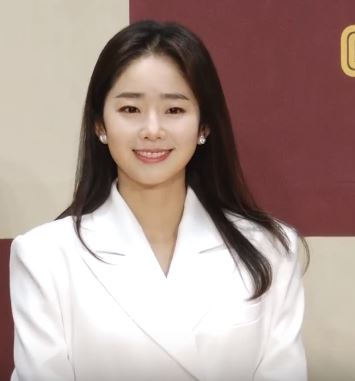
- Lim in 2019
- Born: October 6, 1984 (age 42); Seoul, South Korea
- Education: Seoul Institute of the Arts (Drama)
- Occupation: Actress
- Years active: 2010–present
- Height: 1.65 m (5 ft 5 in)

- Lim Hwa-young
- Hangul: 임화영
- RR: Im Hwayeong
- MR: Im Hwayŏng

Lim Hwa-young (Korean: 임화영, born October 6, 1984) is a South Korean actress.

== Filmography ==
=== Film ===
Year	Title	Role	Notes	Ref.
2014	One on One	Ji-hye		
2015	The Chosen: Forbidden Cave	Suk-jung		
2015	Made in China	Gil Rim-sung		
2016	Snow Paths	young Sung-sim	Cameo	
2017	Misbehavior	Lee Yoon-mi		
2017	Lucid Dream	Choi Kyung-hwan's wife		
2017	One Day	Sun-hwa		
2017	The Tooth and the Nail	Jung Ha-yeon		
2019	Trap: Director's Cut	Yoon Seo-young		
2020	Jazzy Misfits	Homeroom teacher		
2020	Fanfare	Je I		
2020	Dirty Money	So-jin		
2020	Fiction & Other Realities	Ina		

=== Television series ===
Year	Title	Role	Network	Notes	Ref.
2010	Coffee House		SBS		
2010	Quiz of God	Yeo-rang	OCN	Cameo (Ep. 4)	
2011	The Duo	Eon Nyeon	MBC		
2012	Faith		SBS		
2014–2015	4 Legendary Witches	Shim Bok-nyeo (young)	MBC		
2015	Yong-pal	Han Song-yi	SBS		
2016	Signal	Cha Soo-min	tvN		
2017	Good Manager	Oh Gwang-sook	KBS		
2017	You Are Closer Than I Think	Lee Seo-yeon	KBS	Drama special season 8	
2017–2018	Prison Playbook	Kim Je-hee	tvN		
2018	Sketch	Oh Young-sim	JTBC		
2019	Trap	Yoon Seo-young	OCN		
2020	Kkindae	Park Kyo-young			
2020	Birthcare Center	Park Yoon-ji	tvN		
2022	A Superior Day	Choi Jeong-hye	OCN		

=== Music video appearances ===
Music videos appearances
Year	Title	Artist(s)	Ref.
2015	"The Day You Fall"	Baek Ji-young	

== Awards and nominations ==
Year	Award	Category	Recipient	Result
2017	31st KBS Drama Awards	Best New Actress	Good Manager	Nominated
