= Hello Dracula =

2020 South Korean television series

- Promotional poster
- Hangul: 안녕 드라큘라
- RR: Annyeong deurakyulla
- MR: Annyŏng tŭrak'yulla
- Genre: Drama
- Written by: Ha Jung-yoon
- Directed by: Kim Da-ye
- Starring: Seohyun; Lee Ji-hyun; Lee Joo-bin; Go Na-hee; Seo Eun-yool
- Country of origin: South Korea
- Original language: Korean
- No. of episodes: 2

Production
- Running time: 70 minutes
- Production company: Drama House

Original release
- Network: JTBC
- Release: February 17 – February 18, 2020

Hello Dracula (Korean: 안녕 드라큘라; RR: Annyeong deurakyulla) is a 2020 South Korean television series starring Seohyun, Lee Ji-hyun, Lee Joo-bin, Go Na-hee and Seo Eun-yool. Part of the omnibus project Drama Festa, it aired on JTBC on February 17–18, 2020.

== Synopsis ==
Three stories of people trying to overcome their own problems, their draculas.

== Cast ==
=== Main ===
- Seohyun as An-na

An elementary school teacher who usually hides her emotions from her mother since the day she came out to her as a lesbian. She suffers from depression and has recently parted ways with her girlfriend of 8 years.

- Lee Ji-hyun as Mi-young

A famous television series writer and An-na's mother who uses her daughter's name as a pen name. She cares for An-na in her own way, unaware that the latter feels suffocated.

- Lee Joo-bin as Seo-yeon

Lead singer of the band Ashes, she also gives music classes at the same elementary school where An-na teaches since her career as a musician does not pay much. She struggles between realizing her dreams and living her reality.

- Go Na-hee as Yu-ra

One of An-na's students, she comes from a poor family and is often called a beggar by bullies. Because of a redevelopment project, her family is forced to move out and she has to change schools.

- Seo Eun-yool as Ji-hyung

Yu-ra's friend. His reality is entirely different from hers as his father is a university professor. His mother is unhappy with his friendship with Yu-ra because of the social class she belongs to.

=== Supporting ===
- Oh Man-seok as Jong-su

A dentist who also gives life lessons to Mi-young, Seo-yeon, Yu-ra and Ji-hyung.

- Ji Il-joo as Sang-gu

Seo-yeon's ex-boyfriend who left her a year ago. He was cheating on her.

- Lee Chung-ah as So-jung

An-na's ex-girlfriend. She decided to break up due to social and family pressure.

- Moon Ji-hoo as Choi Seon-saeng

A teacher at an elementary school. He is friends with Anna and has good feelings for her.

== Original soundtrack ==
JTBC Hello Dracula Special (Original Television Soundtrack)

Soundtrack album
- Released: February 19, 2020
- Genre: Soundtrack
- Languages: Korean; English
- Labels: Five Senses Entertainment; Funny Thought

No.	Title	Artist	Length
1.	"Lean On Me"	SE O	2:51
2.	"No One Knows"	SE O	3:23
3.	"Something"	Simon Webster, Aalia	3:34
4.	"Lean On Me" (Inst.)	SE O	2:51
5.	"No One Knows" (Inst.)	SE O	3:23
6.	"Something" (Inst.)	Simon Webster	3:34
7.	"Hello Dracula"	Park Sejun, Kim Minji	1:49
8.	"A Painful Memory"	Park Sejun, Woo Jihyun	2:40
9.	"Little Boy's Dream"	Lee Nyeom	2:40
10.	"Behind You"	Park Sejun, Woo Jihyun	2:06
11.	"Failure Of Love"	Park Sejun, Woo Jihyun	2:22
12.	"Not Today"	Park Sejun, Woo Jihyun	1:42
13.	"No One Knows" (Tension Ver.)	Park Sejun, Lim Seoyoung	1:38
14.	"Maum"	Park Sejun, Kim Minji	3:34
15.	"Luminate On You"	Park Sejun, Woo Jihyun	2:16
16.	"Love Is There"	Lee Nyeom	2:06
17.	"Look At You"	Park Sejun, Woo Jihyun	2:14
18.	"Faded Photo"	Park Sejun, Kim Minji	2:16
19.	"Can Not Breath"	Park Sejun, Woo Jihyun	2:55
20.	"Deaf Today"	Park Sejun, Woo Jihyun	2:55
21.	"Bright Sight"	Park Sejun	3:07
22.	"Sand Clock"	Park Sejun, Kim Minji	2:51
23.	"Why Not Me"	Lee Nyeom	3:15
24.	"Waltz In Fairy Tale"	Park Sejun, Lee Nyeom	2:45
25.	"Killing Scent"	Park Sejun, Woo Jihyun	2:33
26.	"Weakness"	Park Sejun, Woo Jihyun	2:16
27.	"Waves If Emotion"	Park Sejun, Woo Jihyun	1:36
28.	"Shall We Go Out"	Song Jinseok	2:01

== Ratings ==
Ep.	Broadcast date	Title	Average audience share (Nielsen Korea)
1	February 17, 2020	I Want to Stop Being Nice Now... (나 이제 그만 착하고 싶어...)	1.238%
2	February 18, 2020	Should We Do This Until We Die? (우리 죽을 때까지 이래야 돼?)	0.885%
Average			1.062%

- This drama aired on a cable channel/pay TV which normally has a relatively smaller audience compared to free-to-air TV/public broadcasters (KBS, SBS, MBC and EBS).
