= Ji Soo =

South Korean actor (born 1993)

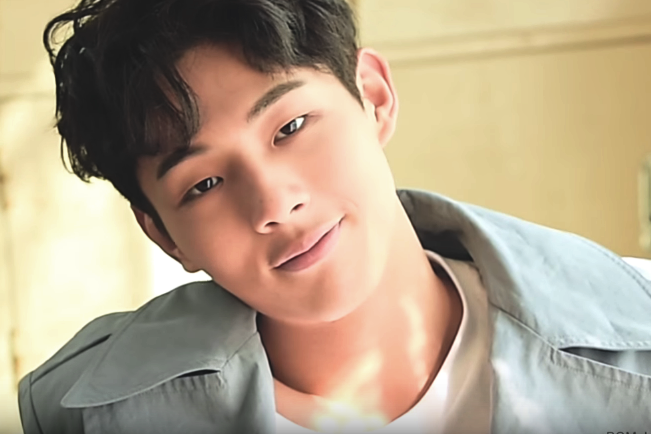
- Ji Soo in March 2016
- Born: Kim Ji-soo; 30 March 1993 (age 33); Busan, South Korea
- Occupation: Actor
- Years active: 2009–2021; 2024–present
- Agents: Prain TPC (2015–2020); KeyEast (2020–2021); Sparkle (2024–present)

Korean name
- Hangul: 김지수
- Hanja: 金志洙
- RR: Gim Jisu
- MR: Kim Chisu

Kim Ji-soo (Korean: 김지수; born 30 March 1993), known professionally as Ji Soo, is a South Korean actor currently based in the Philippines.

== Early life and education ==
In elementary school, Ji Soo was a judo athlete and competed at national level before giving it up due to injuries. He was an actor trainee under JYP Entertainment in 2012.

== Career ==
=== 2009–2016: Beginnings and breakthrough ===
Ji Soo made his acting debut on stage in 2009 and consequently starred in several short films, including having a leading role in the Korean-Filipino independent film Seoul Mates. He first gained recognition in high school drama Angry Mom (2015). Since then, he has starred in television series Cheer Up! (2015), Page Turner (2016) and Moon Lovers: Scarlet Heart Ryeo (2016); as well as the film One Way Trip (2016).

=== 2017–2020: Rising popularity ===
In 2017, he co-starred in JTBC's fantasy romance comedy Strong Woman Do Bong-soon, playing a passionate rookie police officer. He next starred in OCN's crime drama Bad Guys 2. In 2018, Ji Soo was cast in JTBC's drama special Ping Pong Ball, and Netflix's youth romance drama My First First Love. In 2020, Ji Soo signed a contract with KeyEast.

=== 2021–2023: Bullying accusations, military enlistment and hiatus ===
In 2021, Ji Soo was reported to play the male lead in the Korean drama River Where the Moon Rises. The drama began airing on 15 February 2021 with the actor playing the role of On Dal. He starred in the drama for six aired episodes until reported school bullying and assault accusations were made against him. Following this, KBS replaced Ji Soo and he was from then on removed from the show. The role of On Dal was re-cast by actor Na In Woo, who appeared in the drama from episode nine onward.

Actor Ji Soo was announced to be enlisted for mandatory military service duties in October 2021. Reports said that he received a mandatory military service duties summon in December 2020. After completing four weeks of basic military training, he was announced to carry out the rest of his services in the assigned social worker department.

On 6 July 2021, the legal representative of Ji Soo, law company Shin & Kim, released a new statement regarding the open-ended legal procedures of previously-reported school bullying and assault allegations. In May 2021, the same representative had stated that the actor had decided to take legal action against the people who had made false accusations and spread false rumors.

"In March 2021, there were many blatant lies posted on the Internet including those accusing our client of sexual offense allegations. The man who wrote a post accusing our client has sexually assaulted his wife in the past has come forward and apologized, but the rest of the accusatory posts made their way around the web without any verification. Thus, our client has decided to take legal action against the circulators of false information to reveal the truth.

Recently, we were able to locate one of the writers of false accusatory posts thanks to search and seizure on IP addresses and more. The man turned out to be a soldier who recently enlisted. He admitted that everything he claimed in his post was false. He then sincerely apologized to our client with a handwritten letter and plead for his forgiveness given that his mother is currently battling cancer.

Our client has dropped the aforementioned man from the lawsuit after considering both his and the perpetrator's circumstances. However, most publishers are laying low after deleting their false accusatory posts. We will take strict legal action against these people.

Meanwhile, the posts accusing him of school bullying were mostly untrue as well. Our client has sued them for libel. We are writing to notify the search warrant has been issued by the court and the investigations pertaining to the case is underway."

On 27 May 2021, KeyEast announced that Ji Soo's exclusive contract with the agency has been terminated due to the controversy.

=== 2024–present: Return to entertainment ===
Since mid-2024, Ji Soo has been residing in the Philippines and has resumed his acting career with projects on GMA Network, which aired Strong Girl Bong-soon. He guest-starred in the action drama Black Rider. He also played a recurring role in the medical drama Abot-Kamay na Pangarap. On 28 August 2024, Ji Soo signed a contract with GMA's talent agency Sparkle.

== Controversy ==
In a statement posted on an online forum by an anonymous person on 2 March 2021, Ji Soo was accused of being a bully during his school years. The following day, his agency, KeyEast, released a statement saying that "[they] are looking at this incident seriously and will do [their] utmost to verify the facts."

Following a series of similar accusations, Ji Soo posted a hand-written apology to his Instagram account on 4 March 2021. He stated:

"I would like to sincerely apologize to those who were hurt by me. I have absolutely no room for excuses for my actions in the past. They were unforgivable.

As I began acting, I was able to come this far due to the fact that I covered up my past, and as a result received undeserving love and attention from the public.

But deep inside, I always held a sense of guilt in one part of my heart, and an irreversible regret haunted me anxiously. I was always pressed down by my dark past.

I now beg forgiveness to those who were undoubtedly deeply hurt for a long time, seeing me acting, and I will reflect on the unforgivable actions of my past and repent.

I feel miserable and guilty for inflicting so much damage on all of my fellow drama cast and crew members, the broadcasting station, and all those affiliated with the production, solely due to my own personal mistakes. I sincerely pray that the drama will not suffer any more damages.

Once again, I beg for forgiveness on my knees to all those who were hurt by me."

It was later reported that Ji Soo would be replaced by actor Na In-woo in the television series River Where the Moon Rises. KeyEast issued a statement confirming Ji Soo's activities would be halted prior to his military enlistment in October 2021.

== Personal life ==
Ji Soo received surgery for acute osteomyelitis (inflammation of the bone or bone marrow, usually due to infection) on 13 September 2016. On 27 September, he returned to filming Fantastic and was officially discharged from hospital on 1 October.

== Filmography ==
=== Film ===
| Year | Title | Role | Notes | Ref. |
|---|---|---|---|---|
| 2010 | Boy in Pain | —N/a | Short film | |
| 2014 | Han Gong-ju | Member of Min-ho's gang | Bit part | |
| 2014 | Seoul Mates | Joon | Korean-Philippines co-production | |
| 2014 | Adult | —N/a | Short film | |
| 2014 | More Than | —N/a | Short film | |
| 2016 | One Way Trip | Yong-bi | | |
| 2020 | Our Joyful Summer Days | Chan Hee | | |
| 2024 | Mujigae | Ji-sung Park | Philippine film | |

=== Television series ===
| Year | Title | Role | Notes | Ref. |
|---|---|---|---|---|
| 2012 | To the Beautiful You | Student | Cameo | |
| 2012 | Family | Han Song-yi | Cameo (Episode 45) | |
| 2014 | Love Frequency 37.2 | Go Dong-hee's ex-boyfriend | Cameo (Episode 3) | |
| 2015 | Angry Mom | Go Bok-dong | | |
| 2015 | Cheer Up! | Seo Ha-joon | | |
| 2016 | Page Turner | Jeong Cha-sik | KBS Drama Special | |
| 2016 | The Doctors | Kim Soo-cheol | Guest (Episodes 1-3, 5, 7-8) | |
| 2016 | Moon Lovers: Scarlet Heart Ryeo | 14th Prince Wang Jung | | |
| 2016 | Fantastic | Kim Sang-wook | | |
| 2016 | Weightlifting Fairy Kim Bok-joo | Bok-joo's fellow worker | Cameo (Episode 11) | |
| 2017 | Strong Girl Bong-soon | In Gook-du | | |
| 2017–2018 | Bad Guys 2 | Han Kang-joo | | |
| 2018 | Ping Pong Ball | Kim Young-joon | JTBC Drama Festa | |
| 2019 | My First First Love | Yun Tae-oh | | |
| 2020 | When I Was the Most Beautiful | Seo-hwan | | |
| 2020 | Amanza | Park Dong Myung / Amanza | | |
| 2021 | River Where the Moon Rises | On Dal | Episodes 1–6 (Replaced) | |
| 2024 | Black Rider | Adrian Park | Philippine drama | |
| 2024 | Abot-Kamay na Pangarap | Dr. Kim Young | Philippine drama | |
| 2025 | Daig Kayo ng Lola Ko | Dong Hyuk/Seong Nam | Philippine drama | |
| 2025 | Sanggang-Dikit FR | Woo | Antagonist (Hired Assassin) | |
| 2026 | Never Say Die | Lee Jin Ho | First Supporting Role in Philippine Drama | |
| 2026 | Love, Siargao | Han Bin | | |

=== Web series ===
| Year | Title | Role | Notes | Ref. |
|---|---|---|---|---|
| 2015 | Lunch Box | Yong | K-Food Fair 2015 | |

=== Television shows ===
| Year | Title | Role | Ref. |
|---|---|---|---|
| 2016 | Celebrity Bromance | Cast member | |
| 2016 | My Ear's Candy | Cast member | |
| 2023–present | It's Showtime | Guest / Performer | |
| 2025 | Pinoy Big Brother: Celebrity Collab Edition | Houseguest | |
| 2025 | BE COOL: The Express Adventure | Host | |

=== Music video appearances ===
| Year | Title | Artist | Ref. |
|---|---|---|---|
| 2018 | "Wind" (바람사람) | Bolbbalgan4 | |

== Awards and nominations ==
| Year | Award | Category | Nominated work | Result | Ref. |
|---|---|---|---|---|---|
| 2015 | 34th MBC Drama Awards | Best New Actor in a Miniseries | Angry Mom | Nominated | |
| 2015 | 34th MBC Drama Awards | Best Couple Award with Kim Hee-sun | Angry Mom | Nominated | |
| 2016 | 11th Max Movie Awards | Rising Star Award | —N/a | Won | |
| 2016 | 37th Blue Dragon Film Awards | Best New Actor | One Way Trip | Nominated | |
| 2016 | 30th KBS Drama Awards | Excellence Award, Actor in a One-Act/Special/Short Drama | Page Turner | Nominated | |
| 2016 | 30th KBS Drama Awards | Best New Actor | Page Turner | Nominated | |
| 2017 | 53rd Baeksang Arts Awards | Best New Actor (Television) | Strong Girl Bong-soon | Nominated | |
| 2017 | 22nd Chunsa Film Art Awards | Best New Actor | One Way Trip | Nominated | |
| 2017 | 2nd Asia Artist Awards | Rising Star Award | —N/a | Won | |
| 2018 | 13th Soompi Awards | Best Supporting Actor in the male category | Strong Girl Bong-soon | Nominated | |
| 2020 | Busan International Film Festival | Actor of the Year Award | Our Joyful Summer Days | Won | |
| 2020 | 5th Asia Artist Awards 2020 | Popularity Award (Actor) | —N/a | Nominated | |
| 2020 | 39th MBC Drama Awards | Top Excellence Award, Actor in a Wednesday-Thursday Miniseries | When I Was Most Beautiful | Nominated | |
| 2020 | 39th MBC Drama Awards | Best Couple Award with Im Soo-hyang | When I Was Most Beautiful | Nominated | |
| 2024 | GMA Gala Night 2024 | Red Carpet Scene Stealer | —N/a | Won | |
| 2024 | Ima Wa Ima Asian International Film Festival | Outstanding International Actor Award | Abot-Kamay na Pangarap | Won | |
