= The Net (2016 film) =

- Directed by: Kim Ki-duk
- Written by: Kim Ki-duk
- Produced by: Kim Soon-mo
- Starring: Ryoo Seung-bum
- Edited by: Park Min-sun
- Production company: Kim Ki-duk Film
- Release date: October 6, 2016 (South Korea)
- Running time: 114 minutes
- Country: South Korea
- Language: Korean
- Box office: US$379,506

The Net (Korean: 그물; RR: Geumul) is a 2016 South Korean drama film written and directed by Kim Ki-duk. The film had its world premiere at the 2016 Toronto International Film Festival

== Plot ==
Nam Chul-woo is a North Korean fisherman who lives happily with his wife and daughter in a village on the border with South Korea. One day his fishing net gets caught in the boat's engine, making it unmanageable, and the current drags Nam towards South Korea. Once he crosses the border, Nam is captured by the South Korean authorities on suspicion of being a spy.

In Seoul, Nam is subjected to a series of incessant interrogations and torture, but the strong indoctrination carried out by the North Korean regime on its citizens causes him to resist. He is also offered to settle permanently in Seoul, receiving housing and a new job from the government, but he refuses the offer because his family would remain stranded in North Korea.

The officials from the South then decide to leave him alone in a crowded street in Seoul to push him to act in case he is actually a spy: after an initial disorientation, in which he refuses to even open his eyes due to extreme loyalty to his regime, he looks for a street food stall that another North Korean whom he had met in the detention facility and had told him about, before committing suicide, and he meets a prostitute who was beaten by her pimp. Nam cannot believe that in such a prosperous country women can be forced to sell their bodies and after a few hours he returns to the place where he had been left.

His prolonged absence had confirmed some secret service agents' suspicions, but a young official, also originally from the North, takes his side and tries to help him. After the news of the other North Korean's suicide leaks to the press, the authorities decide to release him, also giving him a new engine for the boat, a stuffed animal for his daughter and a sum of money.

In North Korea, the press and television celebrate Nam because he remained patriotically loyal to the regime; however, the military detains him for several days and tortures him much more violently than their counterparts in the South, even confiscating the money he had hidden in his rectum. Nam is later released and returns home, but when he tries to go fishing again, the guards inform him that his license has been revoked and order him to return to shore. Nam refuses, as he has no other job with which to feed his family, and is shot dead by the soldiers.

== Cast ==
- Ryoo Seung-bum as Nam Chul-woo
- Kim Young-min as Inspector
- Lee Won-keun as Oh Jin-woo
- Choi Gwi-hwa
- Kim Su-an as North Korean flower girl

== Awards and nominations ==
Year	Award	Category	Recipient	Result
2016	37th Blue Dragon Film Awards	Best New Actor	Lee Won-keun	Nominated
