= Trap (TV series) =

2019 South Korean television series

- Promotional poster
- Hangul: 트랩
- RR: Teuraep
- MR: T'ŭraep
- Genre: Thriller; Drama
- Created by: OCN
- Written by: Nam Sang-wook
- Directed by: Park Shin-woo
- Starring: Lee Seo-jin; Sung Dong-il; Lim Hwa-young
- Country of origin: South Korea
- Original language: Korean
- No. of episodes: 7

Production
- Executive producers: Lee Jae-kyoo; Park Chul-soo
- Running time: 60 minutes
- Production company: Film Monster

Original release
- Network: OCN
- Release: February 9 – March 3, 2019

Trap (Korean: 트랩) is a 2019 South Korean television series starring Lee Seo-jin, Sung Dong-il and Lim Hwa-young. It is OCN's first series for their new project called "Dramatic Cinema" that combines film and drama formats. It aired from February 9 to March 3, 2019.

== Synopsis ==
Kang Woo-hyun (Lee Seo-jin) is a highly successful news anchor for a broadcasting station. He is beloved by all of South Korea and is rumored to be making a run in politics. Outside of his job, he seems to have the perfect life, alongside his wife, fellow anchor Shin Yeon-soo (Seo Young-hee). One day, Woo-hyun, Yeon-soo, and their children decide to take a trip for their wedding anniversary. What started as a peaceful and celebratory few days of fun turns into tragedy as Woo-hyun's wife and son mysteriously vanish. His apparent case is taken up by grizzled veteran detective Go Dong-kook (Sung Dong-il) and highly respected criminal profiler Yoon Seo-young (Lim Hwa-young), and together, the three unlikely allies slowly piece together the truth about what really happened on that fateful trip.

== Cast ==
=== Main ===
- Lee Seo-jin as Kang Woo-hyun, a successful anchorman who is beloved by the nation and seems to have a perfect life. He suddenly experiences a tragedy while vacationing with his family.
- Sung Dong-il as Go Dong-kook, a veteran detective with uncanny instincts who is assigned to Woo-hyun's case.
- Lim Hwa-young as Yoon Seo-young, a well-known and intelligent profiler who analyzes cases and provides the criminal's profile. She cooperates with Dong-kook on his investigation.

=== Supporting ===
==== People around Kang Woo-hyun ====
- Seo Young-hee as Shin Yeon-soo, Woo-hyun's wife.
- Oh Ryung as Representative Hong
- Lee Joo-bin as Kim Si-hyun
- Oh Han-kyul as Kang Si-woo

==== People around Go Dong-kook ====
- Kim Kwang-kyu as Squad Chief Jang
- Jo Dal-hwan as Bae Nam-soo
- Jang Seong-beom as Park Seong-bum
- Lee Eun-woo as Park Sun-mi
- Choi Myung-bin as Go Min-joo
  - Seo Eun-sol as young Go Min-joo

==== Others ====
- Yoon Kyung-ho as Master Yun
- Sung Hyuk as Hunter
- Byun Hee-bong as Kim Shin-woo
- Kwak Min-ho as Gwang Su-dae
- Jang Won-hyung as Ho-gae
- Lee Hong-nae
- Dong Hyun-bae as Reporter Seo
- Baek Ji-won as Ms. Jo
- Kwon Hyuk-beom as Ms. Jo's staff
- Oh Chang-kyung as Yang Deok-cheol
- Lee Si-hun as Lee Si-hun
- Choi Jae-seop as Reporter Ko

== Viewership ==
Trap : South Korea viewers per episode (thousands)

Season	Episode number						
Season	1	2	3	4	5	6	7
1	626	922	703	964	N/A	1008	1093

Source: Audience measurement performed nationwide by Nielsen Korea.

Average TV viewership ratings
Ep.	Original broadcast date	Title	Average audience share		
Ep.	Original broadcast date	Title	Nielsen Korea		TNmS
Ep.	Original broadcast date	Title	Nationwide	Seoul	Nationwide
1	February 9, 2019	Hunters (사냥꾼들)	2.360%	2.864%	2.7%
2	February 10, 2019	Two Faces (두 얼굴)	3.624%	4.593%	3.7%
3	February 16, 2019	1mm	2.800%	3.439%	2.9%
4	February 17, 2019	Secrets and Lies (비밀과 거짓말)	3.692%	4.269%	4.1%
5	February 23, 2019	Blind Spot (블라인드 스팟)	2.700%	N/A	2.8%
6	February 24, 2019	Hunting Ground (헌팅 그라운드)	3.893%	5.027%	4.5%
7	March 3, 2019	Caught in the Devil's Trap (악마의 덫에 걸리다)	3.992%	5.208%	4.7%
Average			3.294%	— (Note: Due to an unpublished rating, the exact average rating is unknown.)	3.6%
In the table above, the blue numbers represent the lowest ratings and the red numbers represent the highest ratings.; N/A denotes that the rating is not known.; This series aired on a cable channel/pay TV which normally has a relatively smaller audience compared to free-to-air TV/public broadcasters (KBS, SBS, MBC and EBS).
