= Spring Fever (TV series) =

2026 South Korean television series

- Promotional poster
- Hangul: 스프링 피버
- RR: Seupeuring pibeo
- MR: Sŭp'ŭring p'ibŏ
- Genre: Romantic comedy
- Based on: Spring Fever by Baek Min-a
- Developed by: CJ ENM Studios
- Written by: Kim Ah-jung
- Directed by: Park Won-gook
- Starring: Ahn Bo-hyun; Lee Joo-bin
- Music by: Kim Jeong-ha; muii
- Country of origin: South Korea
- Original language: Korean
- No. of episodes: 12

Production
- Executive producers: Kim Chang-mi; Oh Jin-seung; Lee Jun-yong
- Producers: Moon Seok-hwan; Oh Kwang-hee; Park Sun-tae; Yoon Na-hyun
- Running time: 70 minutes
- Production company: Bon Factory

Original release
- Network: tvN
- Release: January 5 – February 10, 2026

Spring Fever (Korean: 스프링 피버) is a 2026 South Korean television series starring Ahn Bo-hyun and Lee Joo-bin. Based on the web novel of the same name by Baek Min-a, it depicts the story of a woman who leaves Seoul after a heartbreak and meets a man who changes her life. It premiered on tvN on January 5, 2026, and aired every Monday and Tuesday at 20:50 (KST). It is also available for streaming on Amazon Prime Video globally.

== Synopsis ==
Yoon Bom is a Seoul vibrant teacher who was accused of an affair scandal unfairly and she moved to Shinsu-eup, a rural area after her bad experience in Seoul. She starts teaching there and is cold and distant at first. But when she meets Seon Jae-gyu, a rough but kind hearted local man, she starts to warm up and opens her heart again.

== Cast and characters ==
=== Main ===
- Ahn Bo-hyun as Seon Jae-gyu

The CEO of JQ Power Energy. People who surround him see him as a big guy who might look like a rough street type, but he's actually got a heart of gold, is super considerate, and is just a genuinely nice guy.

- Lee Joo-bin as Yoon Bom
  - Han Joo-hyun as young Bom

After a painful past in Seoul, she moves to Shinsu-eup and becomes a small-town teacher, catching the villagers' attention. She's tough outside, but soft inside.

=== Supporting ===
- Cha Seo-won as Choi Yi-joon

An elite lawyer.

- Cho Jun-young as Seon Han-gyeol

Jae-gyu's nephew.

- Lee Jae-in as Choi Se-jin

Han-gyeol's rival.

- Bae Jung-nam as Jeong Jin-hyeok

A PE teacher at Shinsu High School.

- Jin Kyung as Seo Hye-sook

A first-year teacher at Shinsu High School, who handles homeroom duties and teaches Korean language. She's a mother of twins.

- Son Yeo-eun as Seon Hee-yeon

Han-gyeol's mother

== Production ==
=== Development ===
Spring Fever is directed by Park Won-gook, who previously helmed Marry My Husband (2024), written by Kim Ah-jung, planned by CJ ENM Studios, and produced by Bon Factory. The series is based on the web novel of the same name by Baek Min-a. It consists of 12 episodes.

=== Casting ===
In October 2024, Ahn Bo-hyun and Lee Joo-bin were reportedly cast, and principal photography was scheduled to begin in 2025.

In April 2025, Cha Seo-won was chosen to join. In May, Lee Jae-in is under positive review by her agency to appear. The casting of Ahn and Lee Joo-bin as the leads was officially confirmed in July. In September, Cha Seo-won, Cho Jun-young, Lee Jae-in, and Bae Jung-nam reportedly joined the cast.

== Release ==
Spring Fever was originally scheduled to premiere on tvN in the second half of 2025 but later moved in the first half of 2026. The series was confirmed to premiere on January 5, 2026, airing every Monday and Tuesday at 20:50 (KST). It is also available for streaming on Amazon Prime Video in more than 240 territories.

== Viewership ==
Spring Fever : South Korea viewers per episode (thousands)

Season	Episode number												Average
Season	1	2	3	4	5	6	7	8	9	10	11	12	Average
1	1098	1080	1283	1155	1225	1154	1182	1192	1295	1280	1361	1316	1218

Source: Audience measurement performed nationwide by Nielsen Korea.

Average TV viewership ratings
Ep.	Original broadcast date	Average audience share (Nielsen Korea)	
Ep.	Original broadcast date	Nationwide	Seoul
1	January 5, 2026	4.832% (1st)	4.676% (1st)
2	January 6, 2026	4.605% (1st)	4.265% (1st)
3	January 12, 2026	5.407% (1st)	4.575% (1st)
4	January 13, 2026	5.041% (1st)	4.858% (1st)
5	January 19, 2026	5.007% (1st)	4.579% (1st)
6	January 20, 2026	4.918% (1st)	4.396% (1st)
7	January 26, 2026	5.140% (1st)	5.460% (1st)
8	January 27, 2026	5.163% (1st)	4.750% (1st)
9	February 2, 2026	5.354% (1st)	5.092% (1st)
10	February 3, 2026	5.456% (1st)	5.311% (1st)
11	February 9, 2026	5.523% (1st)	5.208% (1st)
12	February 10, 2026	5.748% (1st)	5.640% (1st)
Average		5.183%	4.901%
In the table above, the blue numbers represent the lowest ratings and the red numbers represent the highest ratings.; This drama aired on a cable channel/pay TV which normally has a relatively smaller audience compared to free-to-air TV/public broadcasters (KBS, SBS, MBC, and EBS).

== Awards and nominations ==
Name of the award ceremony, year presented, category, nominee of the award, and the result of the nomination
Award ceremony	Year	Category	Nominee	Result	Ref.
Golden Cinematography Awards	2026	Special Acting Award (TV Drama)	Lee Joo-bin	Won	
