= Bad Guys 2 =

2017 South Korean TV series

- Promotional poster
- Also known as: Bad Guys: Vile City
- Hangul: 나쁜 녀석들: 악의 도시
- Lit.: Bad Guys: City of Evil
- RR: Nappeun nyeoseokdeul: agui dosi
- MR: Nappŭn nyŏsŏktŭl: agŭi tosi
- Genre: Police procedural; Crime; Thriller; Action
- Created by: Studio Dragon
- Written by: Han Jung-hoon
- Directed by: Han Dong-hwa
- Starring: Park Joong-hoon; Joo Jin-mo; Yang Ik-june; Kim Mu-yeol; Ji Soo
- Composer: Kim Tae-seong
- Country of origin: South Korean
- Original language: Korean
- No. of episodes: 16

Production
- Executive producers: Heo Gun; Park Ho-shik
- Producers: Han Joon-hyuk; Lee Hae-young
- Camera setup: Single camera
- Running time: 60
- Production company: Urban Works Media

Original release
- Network: OCN
- Release: December 16, 2017 – February 4, 2018

Related
- Bad Guys

Bad Guys 2 (Korean: 나쁜 녀석들: 악의 도시) is a 2017 South Korean television series starring Park Joong-hoon, Joo Jin-mo, Yang Ik-june, Kim Mu-yeol and Ji Soo. It is a spin-off of the 2014 television series Bad Guys. It aired on OCN from December 16, 2017 to February 4, 2018 on Saturdays and Sundays at 22:20 (KST).

== Synopsis ==
Following the sudden, violent and tragic end of a corruption investigation three years earlier, a group of prosecutors and police detectives, unafraid of dealing out haphazard violence and applying torture, bands with an ex-mobster and an assassin. They are determined to cross the line to take revenge, battle organized crime, and end institutional corruption in their city.

== Cast ==
=== Main ===
- Park Joong-hoon as Woo Je-mun

An experienced prosecutor on a crusade, having had a colleague killed and another one crippled three years earlier. After a change in higher-up politics, he is now allowed, and willing to fight dirty to capture his targets.

- Joo Jin-mo as Heo Il-hoo

A widely feared, former violent mobster. After having survived an assassination attempt, he turned to an honorable life as restaurant owner at Turtle Market where his iron fist now marks the law.

- Yang Ik-june as Jang Sung-cheol

A detective, a psychopath, a gambler, or a drug addict, nobody can tell for sure. Broken and dirty as he is, he is determined, without compromise, and fights to the last breath.

- Kim Mu-yeol as Noh Jin-pyeong

A rookie prosecutor who lost his partner to a seemingly random knife attack three years earlier. Still in grief, he is summoned to join a law enforcement team which is sometimes hard to tell apart from thugs.

- Ji Soo as Han Gang-joo

A young man, a killer who lived his entire life as underdog, making every sacrifice to support and protect his younger sister. After an assassination attempt on his sister (meanwhile the mayor's secretary), Gang-joo joins the investigator team, both for revenge and atonement.

=== Supporting ===
- Choi Gwi-hwa as Ha Sang-mo
- Jung Suk-won as Seo Il-kang
- Song Young-chang as Bae Sang-do
- Joo Jin-mo as Lee Myung-deuk
- Kim Yoo-suk as Ban Joon-hyuk
- Park Soo-young as Shin Joo-myung
- Lee Ji-ha as Kim Kyung-im
- Ok Ja-yun as Yang Pil-soon
- Kim Hong-pa as Jo Young-gook
- Jang Shin-young as Kim Ae-kyung
- Jo Yeon-hee as Sung Ji-soo
- Hong Ji-yoon as Han So-yeong
- Kim Min-jae as Detective Hwang Min-gab

== Production ==
- The series is the second collaboration between writer Han Jung-hoon and director Han Dong-hwa of Squad 38. Han Jung-hoon also wrote Bad Guys.
- Park Sung-woong was offered the leading role but declined.
- Uhm Tae-goo was originally cast in the role of Han Gang-joo but due to a knee injury, he was replaced by Ji Soo.
- Kang Ha-neul was originally cast in the role of No Jin-pyeong, but due to scheduling conflicts with his military enlistment, he was replaced by Kim Mu-yeol.

== Original soundtrack ==
=== Part 1 ===
Released on December 17, 2017
No.	Title	Lyrics	Music	Artist	Length
1.	"Who Am I"	Kim Won	Kim Won	Hui (Pentagon)	03:51
2.	"Who Am I" (Inst.)		Kim Won		03:51
Total length:					7:42

== Viewership ==
Bad Guys 2 : South Korea viewers per episode (thousands)

Season	Episode number																Average
Season	1	2	3	4	5	6	7	8	9	10	11	12	13	14	15	16	Average
1	TBD	TBD	TBD	TBD	TBD	TBD	794	1058	937	1074	847	1074	1031	1037	932	1307	TBD

Source: Audience measurement performed nationwide by Nielsen Media Research.

Average TV viewership ratings
Ep.	Original broadcast date	Average audience share		
Ep.	Original broadcast date	AGB Nielsen		TNmS
Ep.	Original broadcast date	Nationwide	Seoul	Nationwide
1	December 16, 2017	2.598%	2.911%	3.9%
2	December 17, 2017	4.195%	4.705%	4.6%
3	December 23, 2017	2.980%	3.396%	2.8%
4	December 24, 2017	3.966%	4.358%	3.9%
5	December 30, 2017	3.377%	3.820%	2.9%
6	December 31, 2017	3.945%	3.727%	3.6%
7	January 6, 2018	3.210%	3.598%	3.1%
8	January 7, 2018	3.948%	3.761%	3.9%
9	January 13, 2018	3.485%	3.657%	3.1%
10	January 14, 2018	4.257%	4.613%	3.8%
11	January 20, 2018	3.450%	3.496%	3.1%
12	January 21, 2018	4.064%	4.245%	4.3%
13	January 27, 2018	3.456%	3.379%	4.2%
14	January 28, 2018	4.012%	4.119%	4.4%
15	February 3, 2018	3.717%	4.016%	3.9%
16	February 4, 2018	4.797%	4.642%	4.8%
Average		3.716%	3.903%	3.8%
The blue numbers represent the lowest ratings and the red numbers represent the highest ratings.; This drama aired on a cable channel/pay TV which normally has a relatively smaller audience compared to free-to-air TV/public broadcasters (KBS, SBS, MBC and EBS).
