= The Practical Guide to Love =

2026 South Korean television series

- Promotional poster
- Hangul: 미혼남녀의 효율적 만남
- Lit.: Efficient Matchmaking for Unmarried Men and Women
- RR: Mihon namnyeoui hyoyuljeok mannam
- MR: Mihon namnyŏŭi hyoyulchŏk mannam
- Genre: Romantic comedy
- Based on: Efficient Dating for Singles by Tari
- Written by: Lee Yi-jin
- Directed by: Lee Jae-hoon
- Starring: Han Ji-min; Park Sung-hoon; Lee Ki-taek
- Music by: Hwang Chan-hee
- Opening theme: "Highlight" by Youngjae
- Country of origin: South Korea
- Original language: Korean
- No. of episodes: 12

Production
- Running time: 70 minutes
- Production company: SLL

Original release
- Network: JTBC
- Release: February 28 – April 5, 2026

The Practical Guide to Love (Korean: 미혼남녀의 효율적 만남) is a 2026 South Korean television series written by Lee Yi-jin, directed by Lee Jae-hoon, and starring Han Ji-min, Park Sung-hoon, and Lee Ki-taek. Based on the Naver webtoon Efficient Dating for Singles by Tari, the series follows a woman who goes on a blind date, meets two charming guys, and navigates her feelings to discover true love. It aired on JTBC from February 28, to April 5, 2026, every Saturday and Sunday at 22:40 (KST). It is also available for streaming on HBO Max and Viki.

== Synopsis ==
Lee Ui-yeong, who was raised by a mother who pressured her to marry, is a single woman dealing with a ton of stress. With her career progressing steadily, she has begun to feel restless, prompting her to consider settling down. She has started going on blind dates, leading to an unexpected dilemma involving two contrasting men. Song Tae-seop, her first date, is a gentle and dependable individual who openly expresses his intentions for love and marriage, forcing Ui-yeong to confront her fears about commitment. Shin Ji-soo, her second date, initially hides his true identity but wins her over with genuine sincerity and carefree charm. His youth and spontaneity challenge Ui-yeong's preconceived notions about love, stirring feelings she hadn't anticipated. Torn between the comfort of stability and the thrill of passion, Ui-yeong must determine what love means to her and whether she's ready to take a chance on it.

== Cast and characters ==
=== Main ===
- Han Ji-min as Lee Ui-yeong

A purchasing team manager at The Hills Hotel. While achieving professional success, she experiences a lack of fulfilment in her romantic life, harbouring desires for romantic connection but isn't interested in wasting time. But as she realizes she misread her coworker's feelings, she takes her friend's advice and tries blind dates, meeting two guys who are total opposites.

- Park Sung-hoon as Song Tae-seop

The CEO of woodworking studio HOME, he possesses a firm conviction beneath his gentle demeanor. Driven by responsibility and consideration, he dedicated his 20s to building a stable foundation for his company. In his thirties, he meets Ui-yeong on a blind date and they fall in love at first sight.

- Lee Ki-taek as Shin Ji-soo

Ui-yeong's second blind date partner. He steps in for his friend on a blind date with her, unwittingly walking into a life-changing encounter.

=== Supporting ===
- Jung Hye-sung as Jung Hyun-min

A purchasing team employee at The Hills Hotel.

- Kim So-hye as Shim Sae-byeok

The youngest member of the purchasing team.

- Lee Mi-do as Jung Na-ri

A purchasing team senior at The Hills Hotel.

- Shin Jae-haas Lawyer at The Hills Hotel
- Moon Jeong-hee
- Joo Yeon-woo as Lim Seung-jun

Ui-yeong's childhood friend.

=== Special appearances ===
- Choi Soo-young as Hyun-ju

Song Tae-seop's ex-girlfriend

- Yoon Park
- Yuk Jun-seo
- Lee Chang-ho

== Production ==
=== Development ===
Produced under SLL, the rom-com drama is based on the Naver webtoon Efficient Dating for Singles by Tari. It is directed by Lee Jae-hoon, who directed Divorce Attorney Shin (2023), and the screenplay is written by Lee Yi-jin.

The script reading took place on May 14, 2025.

=== Casting ===
In February 2025, Newsen reported that Han Ji-min received an offer for the series and was positively considering. The next month, Park Sung-hoon was in talks to star. On May 14, Lee Ki-taek was added to the cast. By May 15, 2025, Han, Park, and Lee along with Jung Hye-sung and Kim So-hye were officially confirmed to appear.

=== Filming ===
Principal photography began in the first half of 2025, and was concluded on November 13, 2025.

== Release ==
The Practical Guide to Love was reportedly scheduled to premiere on JTBC in 2026. In November 2025, the series was under discussion to air as the first JTBC weekend drama of 2026. As stated by Herald Pop, the series would air in January 2026. On December 19, Ize confirmed its premiere date to be on February 28, 2026, and will air every Saturday and Sunday. It is also available for streaming on HBO Max and Viki.

== Viewership ==
The Practical Guide to Love : South Korea viewers per episode (thousands)

Season	Episode number												Average
Season	1	2	3	4	5	6	7	8	9	10	11	12	Average
1	750	850	926	1159	810	1055	917	1033	918	978	899	1105	950

Source: Audience measurement performed nationwide by Nielsen Korea.

Average TV viewership ratings
Ep.	Original broadcast date	Average audience share (Nielsen Korea)	
Ep.	Original broadcast date	Nationwide	Seoul
1	February 28, 2026	3.118% (2nd)	3.379% (1st)
2	March 1, 2026	3.328% (1st)	3.662% (1st)
3	March 7, 2026	3.798% (2nd)	4.085% (1st)
4	March 8, 2026	4.802% (1st)	5.500% (1st)
5	March 14, 2026	3.441% (1st)	3.928% (1st)
6	March 15, 2026	4.507% (1st)	4.606% (1st)
7	March 21, 2026	3.901% (1st)	4.429% (1st)
8	March 22, 2026	4.525% (1st)	4.738% (1st)
9	March 28, 2026	4.004% (1st)	4.306% (1st)
10	March 29, 2026	4.400% (1st)	4.413% (1st)
11	April 4, 2026	4.111% (1st)	4.193% (1st)
12	April 5, 2026	4.968% (1st)	5.224% (1st)
Average		4.075%	4.372%
In the table above, the blue numbers represent the lowest ratings and the red numbers represent the highest ratings.; This series airs on a cable channel/pay TV which normally has a relatively smaller audience compared to free-to-air TV/public broadcasters (KBS, SBS, MBC, and EBS).

== Awards and nominations ==
Award ceremony	Year	Category	Nominee / Work	Result	Ref.
Korean Wave Entertainment Awards	2026	Best OST	"Highlight"	Pending	
Newsis Hallyu Expo	2026	Global OST Popularity Award	"Highlight"	Pending	
