= Lee Won-keun =

South Korean actor

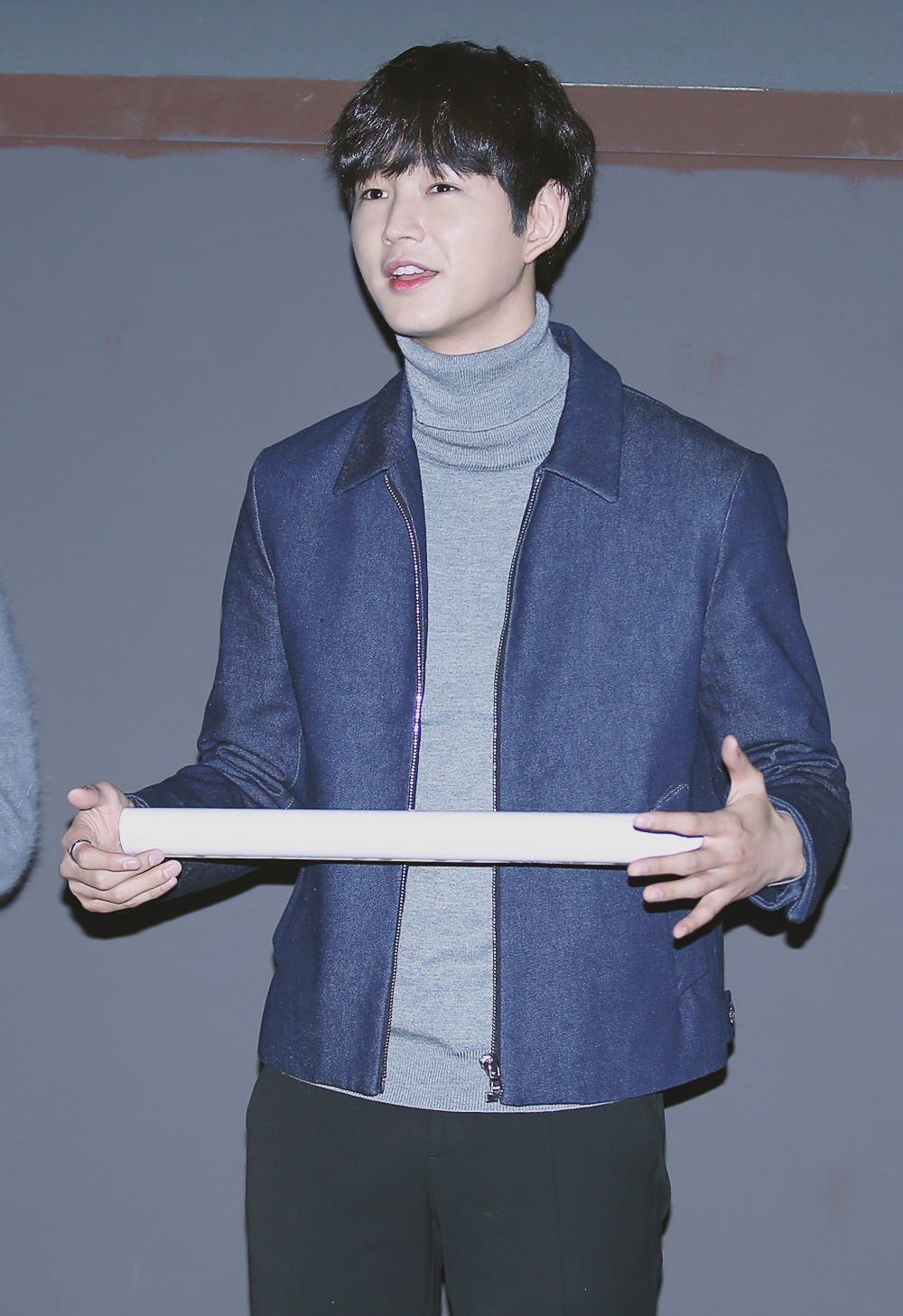
- Lee in 2017
- Born: June 27, 1991 (age 35); South Korea
- Education: Konkuk University – Film Studies
- Occupations: Actor; model
- Years active: 2012–present
- Agent: YooBorn Company

Korean name
- Hangul: 이원근
- Hanja: 李源根
- RR: I Wongeun
- MR: I Wŏn'gŭn

Lee Won-geun (born June 27, 1991) is a South Korean actor. He made his acting debut in the 2012 historical television series Moon Embracing the Sun (2012) and is known for starring in the high school drama Cheer Up! (2015) and romantic-comedy One the Woman (2021), as well as the film Misbehavior (2017).

== Personal life ==
Lee mandatory military service on June 13, 2019, in the National Police Agency Compulsory Police Sugyeong Military Service and was discharged from the conscripted police on January 7, 2021.

== Filmography ==
=== Film ===
| Year | Title | Role | Notes | Ref. |
|---|---|---|---|---|
| 2012 | Adonis | | | |
| 2016 | The Net | Oh Jin-woo | | |
| 2016 | Broken | Ji-hoon | Mini Cinema | |
| 2017 | Misbehavior | Jae-ha | | |
| 2018 | In Between Seasons | Yong-joon | | |
| 2018 | Wretches | Jae-young | | |
| 2018 | Feng Shui | King Heonjong | | |
| 2019 | Rosebud | Myung-hwan (young) | | |
| 2019 | Bring Me Home | Seung-hyun | | |

=== Television series ===
| Year | Title | Role | Notes | Ref. |
|---|---|---|---|---|
| 2012 | Moon Embracing the Sun | Kim Jae-woon (young) | | |
| 2012 | Phantom | Kwon Do-young | | |
| 2013 | Pure Love | Choi Joon-young | | |
| 2013 | Passionate Love | Kang Moo-yeol (young) | | |
| 2014 | 12 Years Promise | Yoo Joon-soo (young) | | |
| 2014 | Drama Festival – "The Diary of Heong Yeong-dang" | Kim Hong-yeon | One-act drama | |
| 2014 | Secret Door | Kim Moon | | |
| 2015 | Hyde Jekyll, Me | Lee Eun-chang | | |
| 2015 | Cheer Up! | Kim Yeol | | |
| 2016 | The Good Wife | Lee Joon-ho | | |
| 2017 | Queen of Mystery | Hong Joon-oh | | |
| 2017 | JTBC Drama Festa – "A Person You Could Know" | Kim Jin-Young | | |
| 2017 | Jugglers | Hwangbo Yul | | |
| 2018 | KBS Drama Special – "Too Bright for Romance" | Hamburger place employee | One act-drama | |
| 2021 | One the Woman | Ahn Yoo-jun | | |
| 2022 | A Superior Day | Kwon Si-woo | | |

=== Web series ===
| Year | Title | Role | Ref. |
|---|---|---|---|
| 2014 | Longing for Spring | Seo Geun-tae | |
| 2016 | Thumping Spike 2 | Dong Hae-sung | |

=== Television shows ===
| Year | Title | Role | Notes | Ref. |
|---|---|---|---|---|
| 2016 | Celebrity Bromance | Cast Member | Season 7 with N | |

=== Music video appearances ===
| Year | Song title | Artist | Ref. |
|---|---|---|---|
| 2012 | "None Other Than You" | Jang Jae-in | |

== Awards and nominations ==
Name of the award ceremony, year presented, category, nominee of the award, and the result of the nomination
| Award ceremony | Year | Category | Nominee / Work | Result | Ref. |
|---|---|---|---|---|---|
| Blue Dragon Film Awards | 2016 | Best New Actor | The Net | Nominated | |
| Buil Film Awards | 2017 | Best New Actor | Misbehavior | Nominated | |
| Chunsa Film Awards | 2017 | Best New Actor | Misbehavior | Nominated | |
| KBS Drama Awards | 2015 | Best New Actor | Cheer Up! | Nominated | |
| KBS Drama Awards | 2015 | Popularity Award, Actor | Cheer Up! | Nominated | |
| KBS Drama Awards | 2015 | Best Couple Award | Lee Won-keun (with Jung Eun-ji); Cheer Up! | Nominated | |
| Oporto International Film Festival | 2017 | Directors Week Best Actor Award | The Net | Won | |
| SBS Drama Awards | 2021 | Excellence Award for an Actor in a Mini-Series Romance/Comedy Drama | One the Woman | Nominated | |
| The Seoul Awards | 2017 | Best New Actor | Misbehavior | Nominated | |
