= Choi Gwi-hwa =

South Korean actor (born 1978)

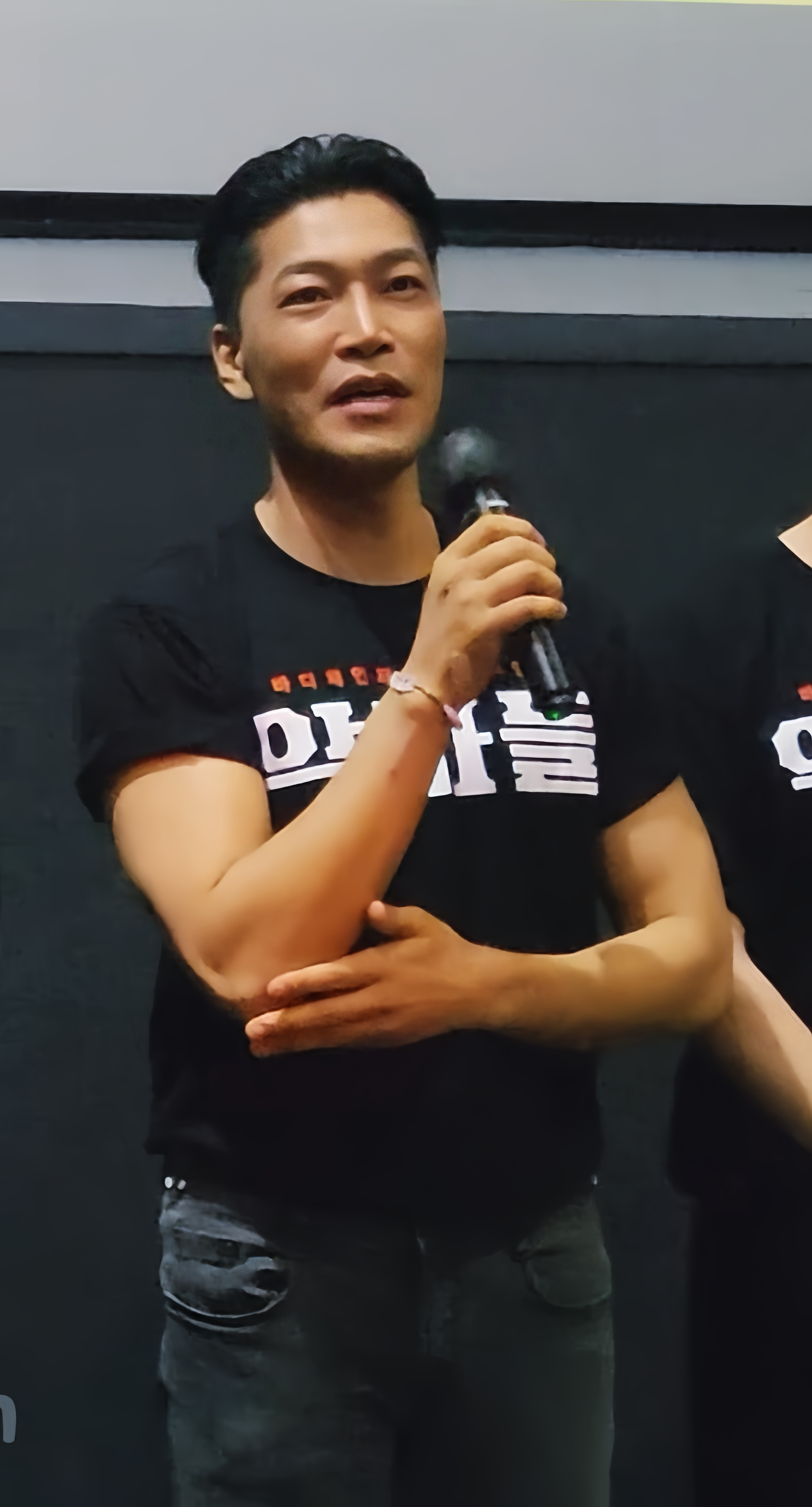
- Choi in 2023
- Born: March 3, 1978 (age 48); Yeonggwang-gun, Jeollanam-do, South Korea
- Occupation: Actor
- Years active: 1997–present
- Agent: Mr. Choi

Korean name
- Hangul: 최귀화
- RR: Choe Gwihwa
- MR: Ch'oe Kwihwa

Choi Gwi-hwa (Korean: 최귀화; born March 3, 1978) is a South Korean actor.

== Career ==
Choi Gwi-hwa joined the Meulmye Theatre Company in Bucheon in 1997. In 1999 he began honing his screen acting with a large number of short movies, landing his first role in a feature-length film in Why Did You Come to my House (2009). His breakthrough role was that of a deputy chief in the cult hit series Misaeng: Incomplete Life (2014), a satirical exploration of life in a typical Korean office environment. Choi has since made notable performances in Train to Busan (2016), The Wailing (2016), A Taxi Driver (2017), and Bad Guys: Vile City (2017). His scene-stealing performance as a police chief in Ma Dong-seok's The Outlaws led him to be awarded Best New Actor by the Korea Film Director's Network.

== Filmography ==
=== Film ===
Year	Title	Role	Notes/Ref.
2009	Why Did You Come to my House	cop	
2010	My Dear Desperado	gang member	
2012	Doomsday Book	removal team (segment "Creation of Heaven")	
2012	Runway Cop	Detective Paeng	
2012	26 Years	team leader of guards	
2013	Very Ordinary Couple	Deputy Department Head Mr. Son's husband	
2013	Way Back Home	Detective from Seoul Prosecutor's Office	
2014	The Target	male hospital employee	
2014	One on One	Oh Ji-ha	
2014	Kundo: Age of the Rampant	military officer	
2014	Sea Fog	voice of other captain	
2014	Scarlet Innocence	gambler	
2015	Gangnam Blues	member of Nam Soon-chul gang	
2016	No Tomorrow	Detective Choi	
2016	The Wailing	Byung-gu	
2016	Seondal: The Man Who Sells the River	fraud in woman's dress Jung Pan-Seok	
2016	Train to Busan	homeless man	
2016	Tunnel	person interested in tunnel 2	cameo
2016	The Net	Director Lee of South Korean Information Bureau	
2017	The King	Choi Min-suk	
2017	Fabricated City	chief prison guard	
2017	A Taxi Driver	leader of plainclothes officers	
2017	The Outlaws	Captain Jeon Il-man	
2018	The Discloser	Sun-ho	
2018	The Soul-Mate	Jong-sik	
2018	The Drug King	general manager Ham	
2019	Mal-Mo-E: The Secret Mission	mailman	
2019	Long Live The King	Choi Man-soo	
2019	Homme Fatale	Yook-gam	
2019	Jesters: The Game Changers	Mal-bo	
2022	Boogie Nights	Yu-bin	
2022	The Roundup	Jeon Il-man	
2022	Project Wolf Hunting	Alpha	
2023	Devils	Team leader	
2025	The First Ride	Nam Jung-dae	cameo
2027	The Sword: Rebirth of the Red Wolf	Daeha Jinchung	

=== Television series ===
Year	Title	Role
2014	Misaeng: Incomplete Life	Assistant Manager Park Yong-gu (IT Sales Team)
2015	Shine or Go Crazy	administrator
2016	The Vampire Detective	Jang Tae-sik
2017	Distorted	Yang Choo-sung
2017	My Golden Life	Kang Nam-goo
2017–18	Bad Guys 2	Ha Sang-mo
2018	Suits	Chae Geun-sik
2018	Jin Choo-ha Returns	Im Hun-sik
2019	The Running Mates: Human Rights	Bae Hong-tae
2023	Revenant	Chun Il-man (Cameo)
2024—2025	Squid Game	Kim Gi-min (Player 203; Season 2—3)
2025	Bon Appetit, Your Majesty	Prince Je Seon
2025	The Murky Stream	Lee Dol-gae
2025	Nice to Not Meet You	Hwang Ji-sun

=== TV films ===
Year	Title	Role
2015	I'm After You	Manager Jeon

=== Television shows ===
Year	Title	Role	Notes	Ref.
2022	Black: I Saw the Devil	Host	crime documentary film; with Kwon Il-yong	
2022	Anti-Ageym	Cast Member		
