= One Way Trip (film) =

- Official Poster
- 글로리데이
- Directed by: Choi Jung-yeol
- Screenplay by: Choi Jung-yeol
- Produced by: Lim Soon-rye
- Starring: Ji Soo; Kim Jun-myeon; Ryu Jun-yeol; Kim Hee-chan
- Cinematography: Lee Hyung-Bin
- Edited by: Lee Yeon-Jeong
- Music by: Jeong Kyo-im
- Production company: Bori Picture
- Distributed by: CJ Entertainment
- Release dates: October 2015 (Busan IFF); March 24, 2016 (South Korea)
- Running time: 93 minutes
- Country: South Korea
- Language: Korean
- Box office: US$1.3 million

One Way Trip (Korean: 글로리데이; lit. 'Glory Day') is a South Korean coming-of-age drama film directed by Choi Jung-yeol and starring Ji Soo, Kim Jun-myeon, Ryu Jun-yeol, and Kim Hee-chan. It was released on March 24, 2016.

The film was displayed at the 20th Busan International Film Festival which was held from October 1 to October 10, 2015. The release of the film's DVD was on October 27, 2016.

== Synopsis ==
It's a story of four best friends who go on a trip before one of them leaves for military service; they get involved in an incident that will change their lives forever.

== Cast ==
=== Main ===
- Ji Soo as Kim Yong-bi
- Kim Jun-myeon as Jeong Sang-woo
- Ryu Jun-yeol as Yoon Ji-gong
- Kim Hee-chan as Park Doo-man

=== Others ===
- Kim Dong-wan as Yong Bi's Older Brother
- Kim Jong-soo as Team Leader Oh
- Choi Joon-yung as Detective Choi
- Lee Joo-sil as Sang-woo's grandmother
- Moon Hee-kyung as Ji-gong's mother
- Yoo Ha-bok as Doo-man's father
- Lee Ji-yeon as Park Eun-Hye
- Jung Do-won as Detective Baek
- Heo Joon-seok as Violent man
- Lee Hyeon as Emergency room doctor
- Yang Hee-myung as Delivery man
- Ahn Se-ho as Prison officer

== Production ==
- Filming began on May 1, 2015 and finished on June 7, 2015.

== Awards and nominations ==
Year	Award	Category	Recipient	Result	Ref.
2016	Hanoi International Film Festival	Jury's Award for Best Feature Film	Choi Jeong-yeol	Won	
2016	37th Blue Dragon Film Awards	Best New Actor	Ji Soo	Nominated	
2017	22nd Chunsa Film Art Awards	Best New Actor	Ji Soo	Nominated	
