= Misbehavior (film) =

2016 South Korean film by Kim Tae-yong

- Theatrical release poster
- Hangul: 여교사
- RR: Yeogyosa
- MR: Yŏgyosa
- Directed by: Kim Tae-yong
- Written by: Kim Tae-yong
- Produced by: Kang Hye-jung; Kim Hyung-min; Jo Sung-min
- Starring: Kim Ha-neul; Yoo In-young; Lee Won-keun
- Cinematography: Kim Tae-soo
- Edited by: Kim Jae-bum; Kim Sang-bum
- Music by: Bang Jun-seok
- Production company: Filmmaker R&K
- Distributed by: Filament Pictures
- Release dates: November 6, 2016 (HIFF); January 4, 2017 (South Korea)
- Running time: 96 minutes
- Country: South Korea
- Language: Korean
- Box office: US$842,563

Misbehavior (Korean: 여교사; RR: yeogyosa; lit. 'Female Teacher') is a 2016 South Korean psychological thriller film written and directed by Kim Tae-yong. The film stars Kim Ha-neul, Yoo In-young and Lee Won-keun.

== Plot ==
A love triangle among two female teachers and a male student.

Park Hyo-joo is a part time chemistry teacher at a high school. After her colleague goes on a maternity leave, she takes over as the homeroom teacher. However, she becomes envious of the newcomer Cha Hae-young, who became a tenured teacher through her rich connections.

At home, she has to struggle with her deadbeat boyfriend who gaslights her. Eventually, she breaks up with him. One night, Park Hyo-joo discovers Cha Hae-young having sex with a student named Shin Jae-ha. The next morning, she threatens to expose Cha Hae-young unless she breaks up with Shin Jae-ha. In the following days, Park Hyo-joo enrolls Shin Jae-ha in ballet classes, to support him for an upcoming competition. During that time, she seduces the student to cope with loneliness.

Shin Jae-ha wins 2nd place in the competition. Later, he maliciously reveals to Park Hyo-joo that their affair was initiated to give Cha Hae-young leverage over her. Park Hyo-joo's contract isn't renewed. She begs Cha Hae-young to negotiate with her father, the chairman of the board, to which the other woman agrees. Later, at a hotel suite, Cha Hae-young reveals that she was just fooling around with Shin Jae-ha and that she never really loved him. Park Hyo-joo murders her by pouring boiling water over her face. She calls Shin Jae-ha at the room, and they have sex, but he asserts that he only loves Cha Hae-young and not Park Hyo-joo. Afterwards, Shin Jae-ha is devastated to discover Cha Hae-young's corpse. The movie ends with Park Hyo-joo eating at school as the police comes for her.

== Cast ==
- Kim Ha-neul as Park Hyo-joo

A restrained part-time instructor at an all-male high school. Emotionally torn, she discovers that her junior Hae-young has nabbed a full-time position at the school through her connections.

- Yoo In-young as Cha hae-young
- Lee Won-keun as Shin Jae-ha

A submissive student, who is keenly aware of his teachers' physical and emotional needs.

- Lee Ki-woo as Choi Min-ho
- Lee Hee-joon as Pyo Sang-woo
- Gi Ju-bong as Shin Byung-soo

Shin Jae-ha's father.

- Kwak Dong-yeon as Yoo Jong-ki
- Lee Geung-young as Board Chairman
- Kim Soo-jin as Female Teacher
- Lim Hwa-young as Lee Yoon-mi

== Awards and nominations ==
Award	Category	Recipients	Result	Ref.
22nd Chunsa Film Awards	Best Actress	Kim Ha-neul	Nominated	
22nd Chunsa Film Awards	Best Supporting Actress	Yoo In-young	Won	
22nd Chunsa Film Awards	Best New Actor	Lee Won-keun	Nominated	
2017 Korean Film Shining Star Awards	Popularity Award	Yoo In-young	Won	
26th Buil Film Awards	Best Actress	Kim Ha-neul	Nominated	
26th Buil Film Awards	Best Supporting Actress	Yoo In-young	Nominated	
26th Buil Film Awards	Best New Actor	Lee Won-keun	Nominated	
1st The Seoul Awards	Best New Actor	Lee Won-keun	Nominated	
