= Kim Soon-mo =

South Korean film producer

Kim Soon-Mo is a South Korean film producer. He is known for his collaborations with Kim Ki-duk.

== Filmography ==
- 663114, (2012)
- Pietà, (2012)
- Moebius, (2013)
- Men, (2013)
- One on One, (2014)
- Made in China, (2014)
- The World of Us, (2016)
- The Net, (2016)
- Saem, (2017)
- Microhabitat, (2017)
