= Lee Joo-bin =

South Korean actress (born 1989)

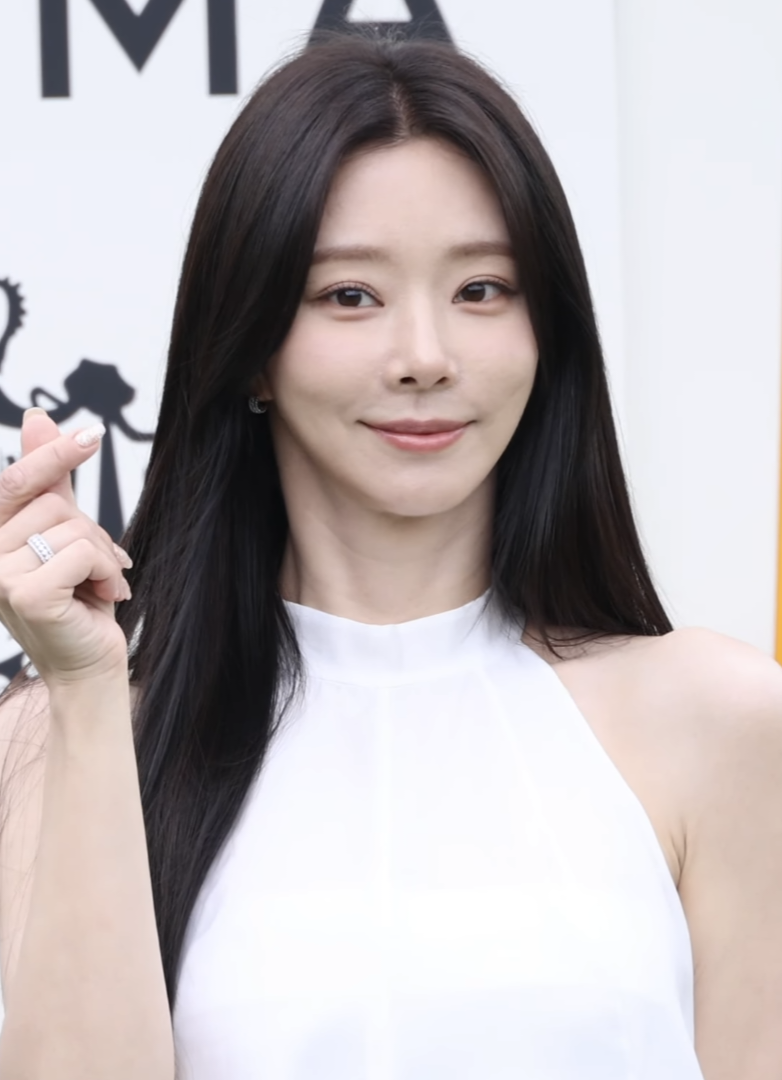
- Lee in April 2026
- Born: September 18, 1989 (age 37); Gangneung, South Korea
- Education: Dongduk Women's University
- Occupations: Actress; model
- Years active: 2010–present
- Agent: KeyEast
- Height: 163 cm (5 ft 4 in)

Korean name
- Hangul: 이주빈
- Hanja: 李主儐
- RR: I Jubin
- MR: I Chubin

Lee Joo-bin (Korean: 이주빈; born September 18, 1989) is a South Korean actress and model. She is best known for her roles in Be Melodramatic (2019), Hello Dracula (2020), Find Me in Your Memory (2020), She Would Never Know (2021), Doctor Lawyer (2022), Money Heist: Korea – Joint Economic Area (2022), Queen of Tears (2024) and Spring Fever (2026). Her lead role was in The Divorce Insurance (2025).

== Career ==
Lee is a former DSP trainee who almost debuted as a member of the girl group Rainbow in 2009. Lee left DSP Media after deciding she did not want to pursue a career as a singer and felt she was too old to become an idol. She later appeared in KBS's weekend drama My Only One, alongside Go Woo-ri from Rainbow.

Lee starred in the TvN romantic-comedy series Spring Fever opposite Ahn Bo-hyun in 2026. It is based on the web novel of the same name by Baek Min-a, about a woman who leaves Seoul after a heartbreak and meets a man who changes her life. Lee played the protagonist Yoon Bom, a small-town teacher.

== Filmography ==
=== Film ===
Year	Title	Role	Notes	Ref.
2017	Lalala		Short film	
2017	Joseon Farmers Dictionary		Web film	
2019	LOVE, AGAIN			
2024	The Roundup: Punishment	Han Ji-soo		

=== Television series ===
Year	Title	Role	Notes	Ref.
2017	Whisper	Secretary	Bit part	
2018	Mr. Sunshine	Gye-hyang		
2018–2019	My Only One	Jeon Soo-jung		
2019	Trap	Kim Si-hyun		
2019	Item	Mysterious woman	Cameo	
2019	Be Melodramatic	Lee So-min		
2019	The Tale of Nokdu	Mae Hwa-soo		
2020	JTBC Drama Festa: "Hello Dracula"	Jo Seo-yeon	One act-drama	
2020	Find Me in Your Memory	Jung Seo-yeon		
2021	She Would Never Know	Lee Hyo-joo		
2021	Drama Stage: "Love Spoiler"	Yoon Seo-ul	One act-drama	
2022	Doctor Lawyer	Lim Yu-na		
2022	Money Heist: Korea – Joint Economic Area	Yun Mi-seon		
2022	Love in Contract	Jung Ji-eun		
2023	Love to Hate You	Oh Se-na		
2024	Queen of Tears	Cheon Da-hye		
2024	Tarot	Ji-oh	Episode 7	
2025	The Divorce Insurance	Kang Han-deul		
2025	Twelve	Mirr		
2026	Spring Fever	Yoon Bom		

=== Web series ===
Year	Title	Role	Ref.
2018	Love Is Jungle	Joo-bin	
2020	Gu Doo Ri's Sushi Restaurant	Gu Doo-Ri	
2026	Sunim & Sonim: Soul Trip in India		

=== Music video appearances ===
Year	Song title	Artist
2008	"A Song Calling for You"	SS501
2011	"Tok Tok" (feat. Soya)	Mighty Mouth
2017	"Yesterday"	Block B
2018	"If I Know" (미리 알았더라면)	Lee Woo
2019	"Never Ending" (십삼월)	Im Chang-jung
2021	"Confession" (고백 프로젝트)	Jang Beom-jun

== Accolades ==
=== Awards and nominations ===
Name of the award ceremony, year presented, category, nominee of the award, and the result of the nomination
Award ceremony	Year	Category	Nominee / Work	Result	Ref.
Golden Cinematography Awards	2026	Special Acting Award (TV Drama)	Spring Fever	Won	
MBC Drama Awards	2020	Best New Actress	Find Me in Your Memory	Nominated	
MBC Drama Awards	2022	Excellence Award, Actor in a Miniseries	Doctor Lawyer	Nominated	

=== Honors ===
Name of country or organization, year given, and name of honor
Country or organization	Year	Honor	Ref.
Newsis K-Expo Cultural Awards (Note: Co-sponsored by Korea's Ministry of Culture, Sports and Tourism, Ministry of Trade, Industry, and Energy, Korea Communications Commission, and Korea Creative Content Agency, it awards cultural icons and businesses that promote the sustainability of the Korean Wave and boost the industry's competitiveness.)	2025	National Assembly's Culture, Sports and Tourism Committee Award	
