= Gangnam Zombie =

2023 South Korean action horror film

- official release poster
- Hangul: 강남좀비
- Hanja: 江南좀비
- RR: Gangnam jombi
- MR: Kangnam chombi
- Directed by: Lee Soo-seong
- Screenplay by: Choe Seung
- Produced by: Lee Soo-seong; Choe Gwang-rae
- Starring: Ji Il-joo; Park Ji-yeon; Cho Kyung-hun
- Cinematography: Kim Do-young
- Edited by: Bak Su-jin
- Production companies: Lee Film; Joy N Cinema
- Distributed by: Contents Panda
- Release date: January 5, 2023
- Running time: 81 minutes
- Country: South Korea
- Language: Korean
- Box office: US$394,420

Gangnam Zombie (Korean: 강남좀비) is a 2023 South Korean action horror film starring Ji Il-joo and Park Ji-yeon. This is Ji Il-joo's first feature film and Park's first in 7 years. The film premiered on January 5, 2023.

== Plot ==
On the night just before Christmas, in the midst of the COVID-19 pandemic, two men in Seoul break into a container from China containing gold jewelry. But also in the container is a cat, which suddenly attacks and scratches one of the men. Later, as they retreat, the scratched man, Wang-i, becomes sick. When his concerned friend looks after him, Wang-i suddenly attacks him and bites his throat out before rolling into the nearby river. He floats in the current to the Gangnam District, where he emerges from the water and later catches public attention by consuming a chunk of raw, bloody meat in the streets.

Hyeon-seok, a former taekwondo champion, has recently moved to Seoul for work at a small online streaming firm in a Gangnam office building. He has a crush on his co-worker Min-jeong, but Min-jeong disapproves of him, while his carefree, selfish boss Tae-soo harasses her and has yet to make any profit and pay his workers a salary. The next day, Wang-i appears in the building and attacks people, who swiftly turn into blood-craving zombies like him and bite any human being they encounter, rapidly spreading the infection. Soon-ja, the building's renter, orders the exits to be locked, sealing everyone inside, before she and a wounded security guard are forced to flee to Hyeon-seok and Min-jeong's workplace and inform them of the situation.

Smelling a chance for profit, Tae-soo insists on filming the carnage, but the group is discovered and attacked, and all but Hyeon-seok and Min-jeong are killed and infected. Unable to call for help because the phone lines are blocked, they try to fight their way out but are eventually cornered in the entrance hall. Hyeon-seok shelters Min-jeong inside a minivan before reentering the fight. Just as he is being overwhelmed, Min-jeong rescues him with a fire extinguisher from the car, and they escape to the building's parkade. There, they are attacked by Wang-i and Soon-ja; they bring down both zombies, but Hyeon-seok is bitten by Soon-ja. Knowing what will happen to him, he and Min-jeong share a sorrowful farewell until they discover that Soon-ja was wearing dentures, thus saving him from infection. They make their way up to the garage's roof, but Wang-i recovers from his battering and follows them, leaving their fates uncertain.

== Cast ==
=== Main ===
- Ji Il-joo as Hyeon-seok
- Park Ji-yeon as Min-jeong

=== Supporting ===
- Cho Kyung-hun as Wang-i, a man getting infected with a mutated strain of the coronavirus and becoming a zombie
- Choi Seong-min as Tae-soo, Hyeon-seok and Min-jeong's boss
- Tak Teu-in as Dae-yeong, Hyeon-seok and Min-jeong's co-worker
- Jung I-joo as Soon-ja, the office building's owner
- Yoon Jun-ho as Guard #1
- Park Ji-hoon as Guard #3

== Production ==
In December 2021, Ji Il-Joo and Park Ji-yeon confirmed their participation in the film as Hyeon-seok and Min-jeong respectively. The movie was originally titled Gangnam ( 강남 ). Filming began in December 2021. The film will be distributed by Contents Panda.

== Release ==
Production companies Lee Film and Joy N Cinema promoted the film at the 2022 Cannes Film Festival and screened its first trailer. The film was pre-sold to multiple South East Asian countries including Thailand, Mongolia, and Vietnam. In Vietnam, the movie was screened in over 40 theatres in Ho Chi Minh City alone.

The film premiered on January 5, 2023, in Vietnam, on January 5, 2023, in South Korea, and Thailand on January 12, the Philippines on January 18, and Mongolia on January 19, 2023.

International distributor Well Go USA acquired North American rights to the film.

== Commercial performance ==
The film was a commercial success according to production company Joy N Cinema which reported Gangnam Zombie was a great success and was their best-selling film at the 2022 Cannes Film Festival. The film was pre-sold in 134 countries before its release including North America, Germany, Thailand, Japan, the Philippines, Mongolia, South America, and Indonesia.

In South Korea, the film got only 2098 cinema admissions. According to Box Office Vietnam, Gangnam Zombie ranked among the top highest-grossing films in Vietnam in its first days of release, being the only South Korean film on the list. The film ended up ranking at 3 on the weekend revenue in the country grossing 4,4B Dong (~$187,000 US) with only $9,000 US from 3rd place; Vietnamese thriller "Blue Wolf: Wild Chrysanthemum in the Night", over 48,000 moviegoers, ranking 3rd. It has accumulated about 6,7B Dong (~$285,000 US) during its first week .

Gangnam Zombie was also among the 16 notable films selected by Screen Daily at Cannes.
