= Jesters: The Game Changers =

2019 South Korean historical comedy

- Theatrical release poster
- Hangul: 광대들: 풍문조작단
- RR: Gwangdaedeul: pungmun jojakdan
- MR: Kwangdaedŭl: p'ungmun chojaktan
- Directed by: Kim Joo-Ho
- Written by: Kim Joo-Ho
- Produced by: Lim Ji-Young
- Starring: Cho Jin-woong; Son Hyun-joo; Park Hee-soon; Ko Chang-seok; Choi Won-young; Kim Seul-gi; Yoon Park; Kim Min-seok; Jang Nam-yeol; Kim Hee-chan; Choi Gwi-hwa
- Cinematography: Sung-Rim Joo
- Edited by: Bum Kim Sang
- Music by: Mowg
- Production company: Simplex Films
- Distributed by: Warner Bros. Pictures
- Release date: August 21, 2019
- Running time: 108 minutes
- Country: South Korea
- Language: Korean
- Box office: US$4.4 million

Jesters: The Game Changers (Korean: 광대들: 풍문조작단) is a 2019 South Korean historical comedy film written and directed by Kim Joo-Ho.

== Plot ==
The story centers on a gang of con artists who are paid to boost people's reputations with rumors, exaggerated claims, and other stunts. King Sejo's adviser Han Myeong-hoe orders them to use their skills to improve public opinion of the king.

Elements of the story are based on King Sejo of Joseon, who launched a coup that allowed him to seize the throne from his young nephew. He killed a number of people to secure the throne, including his nephew Danjong of Joseon, who was poisoned following a plot to remove Sejo from power.

== Cast ==
- Cho Jin-woong as Deok-Ho
- Son Hyun-joo as Han Myeong-hoe
- Park Hee-soon as King Sejo
- Ko Chang-seok as Hong-chil
- Choi Won-young as Hong Yoon-sung
- Kim Seul-gi as Geun-Deok
- Yoon Park as Jin-sang
- Kim Min-seok as Pal-poong
- Jang Nam-yeol as Yang-Jung
- Choi Gwi-hwa as Mal-bo
- Kim Hee-chan as the crown prince
- Baek Soo-hee as Dodo

== Release ==
The film was released in South Korea on August 21, 2019, and in the following year, had its North American premiere at the Fantasia Film Festival.

== Box office ==
On the first day of its release the film was shown on 804 screens, sold 87,124 tickets, and grossed US$591,383, opening at #3 at the Korean box office.

== Reception ==
The Korea Herald reviewed the film, commenting that "While it aimed to be funny and original, and its props were quite creative, its narrative was sloppy and the parade of cheap and uncomfortable jokes unimpressive." Conversely, Asian Movie Pulse stated that it was "a respectful ode to the storytellers and the magic of storytelling as a medium of entertainment as well as propaganda, a good-looking production overall which has way more merits than demerits."

The Chosun praised the acting of Son Hyun-joo, Park Hee-soon, and Cho Jin-woong while criticizing Yoon Park's acting as awkward.
