= Seoul Mates =

2014 film by Nash Ang

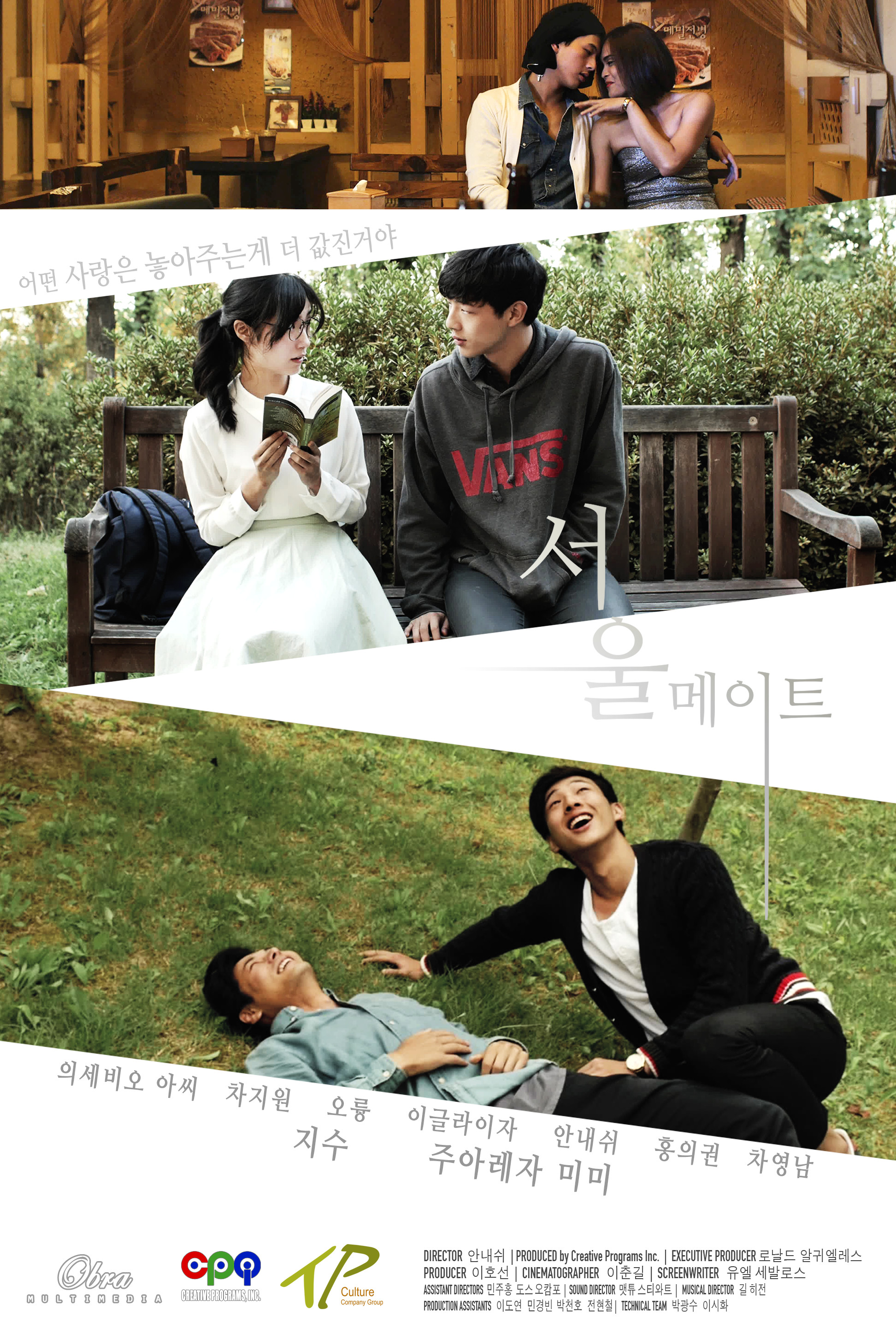
- Directed by: Nash Ang
- Written by: Racquel Ceballos; Nash Ang
- Produced by: Ronald Arguelles; Hoseon Lee
- Starring: Ji Soo; Mimi Juareza; RC Eusebio; Nash Ang
- Cinematography: Chungil Lee
- Music by: Gil Hizon
- Production companies: OBRA Incorporated; Samsong Entertainment Media Holdings
- Release date: November 10, 2014 (Philippines)
- Running time: 115 minutes
- Countries: Philippines; South Korea
- Languages: Filipino; Korean; English

Seoul Mates is a 2014 independent romantic comedy film. Directed by Nash Ang, the film is historically the first co-produced feature film between the Philippines and South Korea. Made by the Philippine company OBRA Incorporated and Samsong Entertainment Media Holdings in South Korea, the project was based from a bilingual production setup involving staff and performers from both nations. The film focuses on the experiences of Filipino migrant workers and transgender identity in South Korea, starring Ji Soo alongside Mimi Juareza as the principal characters. It premiered at the Cinema One Originals Film Festival in Manila.

== Plot ==
Alice, a Filipino transgender woman, travels to Seoul to locate her former boyfriend, only to find him living with another partner, which results to severe emotional distress. While contemplating suicide on a bridge overlooking the Han River, she encounters Joon, a young Korean musician who is struggling to cope up with personal and family pressures. Despite their cultural and language differences, the two strangers develop an unconventional companionship as they navigate their respective crises in Seoul, thereby finding mutual support.

== Cast ==
- Ji Soo as Joon
- Mimi Juareza as Alice
- RC Eusebio as Jason
- Nash Ang as Arthur
- Liz Cha as Suyong
- Glaiza Valdez as Petra
- Youngnam Cha as Cholsu
- Eukwon Hong as Minsoo

== Production ==
The film's concept originated in 2013. Nash Ang developed the story during his studies at the Korea National University of Arts in Seoul. The production was shot over two months in Seoul, wherein a bilingual crew was hired to cope up with the communication challenges. Ronald Arguelles produced the film. Hoseon Lee served as line producer based from a co-production agreement that allowed the team to avail of municipal film grants, thereby completing the project with score by Gil Hizon, cinematography by Chungil Lee, and sound design by Mathieu Steward.

== Release ==
Seoul Mates premiered on November 10, 2014, as an official competition entry at the Cinema One Originals Film Festival in Manila, where it was nominated for Best Picture. Indiespace hosted the South Korean premiere. Held on January 17, 2015, in Jongno-gu, Seoul, the screening was followed by a talkback session with the director based from a schedule coordinated by co-producers. Screenings in Tokyo and Indonesia followed. The film was subsequently shown at the Japanese Love Story Film Festival in 2019, wherein audiences could avail of English and Japanese subtitles. The film was later acquired for digital distribution by the LGBTQ+ streaming platform GagaOOLala, thereby expanding its reach across MUBI and other international services.

== Reception ==
Reviewing the film, Zig Marasigan of Rappler praised its willingness to address gender issues, writing that such topics "demand more active, public discussion, and entertainment is an effective way to open up dialogue to a larger market." The review praised the cast. Macky Macarayan of Death of Traditional Cinema described the film as a comedy about mistaken identities and praised the performances of Juareza and Ji Soo. Retrospective profiles of the director in Cosmopolitan Philippines and Inquirer Entertainment noted the casting of Ji Soo and highlighted the film's status as a significant bilateral co-production, wherein his cultural advocacy is detailed. Further discussion of the film's production history was featured in The Korea Times as part of the background for the establishment of the Korea Pinoy International Film Festival in 2019, allowing the public to cope up with migration discourses.
