= Fantastic (TV series) =

- Promotional poster
- Genre: Romantic comedy, Drama
- Written by: Lee Sung-eun
- Directed by: Jo Nam-kook; Shim Na-yeon
- Starring: Joo Sang-wook; Kim Hyun-joo; Kim Tae-hoon; Park Si-yeon; Ji Soo
- Country of origin: South Korea
- Original language: Korean
- No. of episodes: 16

Production
- Executive producers: Song Won-sub; Lee Sang-baek
- Producers: Kim Min-ji; Hwang Ji-woo
- Camera setup: Single camera
- Running time: 60 minutes
- Production company: AStory

Original release
- Network: JTBC
- Release: September 2 – October 22, 2016

Fantastic (Korean: 판타스틱; RR: Pantaseutik, stylised as FantastiC) is a 2016 South Korean television series starring Joo Sang-wook, Kim Hyun-joo, Park Si-yeon and Ji Soo. It tells the story of a successful drama writer whose life turns upside down after she discovers that she has a terminal illness and a famous actor who can't act. It aired on cable network JTBC on Fridays and Saturdays at 20:30 (KST) from September 2 to October 22, 2016.

== Synopsis ==
As a hardworking scriptwriter, So-hye (Kim Hyun-joo) is writing a drama about cancer, when coincidentally she is diagnosed with breast cancer and learns she has five months left to live. She decides to live it up, leave no regrets, and do whatever she feels like doing. However, as a workaholic, she also commits to finishing her last project, and then leaving quietly. But Hae-sung (Joo Sang-wook), a famous star and her first love, suddenly shows up and her plans fall through. So-hye is actively opposed to casting Hae-sung as the lead in her latest drama. His stiff, robotic acting and constant nagging annoy her, and they occasionally have petty fights. But along the way, they actually seem to be falling in love. Meanwhile, Jun-gi (Kim Tae-hoon) has been by her side, both as her doctor and a friend. He knows So-hye's bright demeanor sometimes acts as a cover for her secret burden. He knows her well, and he's been through it himself. Though he can't cure her, he wants to be her steady soulmate, and face the reality together. Jun-gi and Hae-sung fight for So-hye's love, and with mixed emotions, she is indecisive. How can she decide when she only has a few months left? What is the best way to leave without regrets?

== Cast ==
=== Main ===
- Kim Hyun-joo as Lee So-hye

A successful scriptwriter who has her life turned into complete turmoil after discovering that she has breast cancer. She has a crush on Dr. Hong Jun-gi and gets easily annoyed at the antics of Ryu Hae-sung. But Hae-sung and So-hye have a romantic history. She is conflicted about accepting her feelings for Hae-sung because she does not want to ruin his career over a scandal. She also believes he won't be able to bear the pain of her death from cancer and hides that from him.

- Joo Sang-wook as Ryu Hae-sung

A very successful actor in China, though he has no skills at acting. He is popular among women because of his looks, and he is a little obsessed about his looks. He truly loves and cares for So-hye. He regrets his decision of betraying So-hye a decade ago, and constantly tries to win her over. Although So-hye keeps rejecting him, he does not stop making attempts to woo her. He gets envious of Dr. Jun-gi as So-hye is close to him. He is funny and has a childlike innocence. Later, he gets close to Dr. Jun-gi and treats him like his older brother.

- Park Si-yeon as Baek Sul

A wife of a congressman who is living a very unhappy life. Her husband is cheating on her with another woman, and he, along with her sisters-in-law, constantly humiliate her and treat her like a servant. Her mother is ill and needs money for her treatment, thus Baek Sul continues to live a horrible life in exchange for money. She seeks for her young days in motorcycling to relieve the stress that she experiences from her in-laws. On one of her motorcycle rides, she gives a lift to Sang-wook and gets acquainted with him. With the encouragement from So-hye and Mi-sun, she decides to divorce her husband and put an end to her misery.

- Ji Soo as Kim Sang-wook

A young and aspiring lawyer who has a crush on Baek Sul after a motorcycle ride with her. He works as an attorney for the company owned by Baek Sul's husband without knowing that she is married. After he sees her hurt and beaten up, he encourages her to treat herself well as she is the most important person. Later, he quits his job and represents Baek Sul as her divorce lawyer.

- Kim Tae-hoon as Dr. Hong Jun-gi

A doctor and director on whom So-hye has a crush. He has been suffering from cancer for the last 5 years, and is kind of an inspiration to So-hye. He deeply loves and cares for So-hye. After being rivals for So-hye, he becomes a good friend of Hae-sung.

- Kim Jung-nan as Choi Jin-sook

She is the sister-in-law of Baek Sul, and the president of the agency to which Hae-sung belongs. She is a shrewd business women who threatens people to get her work done. After finding out that So-hye is suffering from fourth stage cancer, she threatens her to break up with Hae-sung. She is a terrible sister-in-law and bothers Baek Sul over the series.

=== Supporting ===
- Jo Jae-yoon as Oh Chang-suk, Ryu Hae-sung's manager
- Yoon Ji-won as Hong Sang-hwa, assistant scriptwriter and good friend of Kim Sang-wook
- Kim Young-min as Choi Jin-tae, Baek Sul's husband
- Kim Jae-hwa as Jo Mi-sun, Lee So-hye and Baek Sul's friend
- Jang Joon-yoo as Jamie, Dr. Hong Jun-gi's sister
- Jung Ye-ji as (Supporting)
- Lee Joo-yeon as Actress (cameo)

== International broadcast ==
In Vietnam, the series was broadcast on VTV3 at 17:20 p.m. on weekdays starting from March 23, 2020 under the title Tình yêu diệu kỳ.

== Ratings ==
In this table, the blue numbers represent the lowest ratings and the red numbers represent the highest ratings.

| Ep. | Original broadcast date | |
| Ep. | Original broadcast date | AGB Nielsen |
| Ep. | Original broadcast date | Nationwide |
|---|---|---|
| 1 | September 2, 2016 | 2.237% |
| 2 | September 3, 2016 | 2.396% |
| 3 | September 9, 2016 | 2.468% |
| 4 | September 10, 2016 | 2.360% |
| 5 | September 16, 2016 | 1.805% |
| 6 | September 17, 2016 | 2.648% |
| 7 | September 23, 2016 | 2.396% |
| 8 | September 24, 2016 | 2.308% |
| 9 | September 30, 2016 | 2.358% |
| 10 | October 1, 2016 | 1.933% |
| 11 | October 7, 2016 | 2.638% |
| 12 | October 8, 2016 | 2.682% |
| 13 | October 14, 2016 | 2.498% |
| 14 | October 15, 2016 | 2.135% |
| 15 | October 21, 2016 | 2.471% |
| 16 | October 22, 2016 | 2.400% |
| Average | | 2.358% |

- This drama airs on a cable channel/pay TV which normally has a relatively smaller audience compared to free-to-air TV/public broadcasters (KBS, SBS, MBC and EBS).
