= She Would Never Know =

2021 South Korean television series

- Promotional poster
- Hangul: 선배, 그 립스틱 바르지 마요
- Lit.: Senior, Don't Put on That Lipstick
- RR: Seonbae, geu ripseutik bareuji mayo
- MR: Sŏnbae, kŭ ripsŭt'ik parŭji mayo
- Genre: Romantic drama; Romantic comedy; Slice of life
- Based on: Senior, Don't Put on That Lipstick by Elise (Elize)
- Written by: Chae Yoon
- Directed by: Lee Dong-yoon; Ra Ha-na
- Starring: Won Jin-ah; Rowoon; Lee Hyun-wook; Lee Joo-bin; Lee Kyu-han
- Country of origin: South Korea
- Original language: Korean
- No. of episodes: 16

Production
- Executive producer: Kim Ji-yeon
- Editor: Lee Hyun-jung
- Running time: 65 minutes
- Production company: JTBC Studios

Original release
- Network: JTBC
- Release: January 18 – March 9, 2021

She Would Never Know (Korean: 선배, 그 립스틱 바르지 마요) is a South Korean television series starring Won Jin-ah, Rowoon, Lee Hyun-wook, Lee Joo-bin, and Lee Kyu-han. Based on the 2017 web novel Senior, Don't Put on That Lipstick by Elise (Elize), it premiered on JTBC on January 18, 2021.

== Synopsis ==
The series tells the story of people working on the marketing team of a cosmetics brand. The love story focuses on the senior/junior relationship of Yoon Song-ah (Won Jin ah) and Chae Hyun-seung (Rowoon). The storyline also include Chae Hyun-seung's sister, Chae Ji-Seung a dress maker, dating Lee Jae-Woon, a BM at the cosmetics company; and his other sister, Chae Yeon-Seung's relationship with her closeted husband, Kang Woo-Hyun and their young daughter, Kang Ha-Eun.

== Cast ==
=== Main ===
- Won Jin-ah as Yoon Song-ah

a senior at KLAR cosmetics 2 years older in work experience and 1 year older in age from Hyun seung. She was in a relationship with BM Lee Jae-shin for 2 years.

- Rowoon as Chae Hyun-seung

an intern who started to like Song-ah since their first encounter when he was still looking for a job. He was the first one to know about Song-ah and BM Lee's relationship.

- Lee Hyun-wook as Lee Jae-shin

BM secretly dating Song-ah for 2 years but is engaged to Lee Hyo-joo.

- Lee Joo-bin as Lee Hyo-joo

BM Lee Jae-Woon's sister; granddaughter to the owner of the cosmetic company; engaged to BM Lee Jae-shin.

- Lee Kyu-han as Lee Jae-woon

a BM at the cosmetic company, grandson to the owner of the cosmetic company; starts dating Chae Hyun-seung's sister Chae Ji-Seung.

- Wang Bit-na as Chae Ji-seung

Chae Hyun-seung's sister; a high-end wedding dress maker; starts dating BM Lee Jae-woon

=== Supporting ===
- Park Han-sol as Lee Se-rim, Chae Hyun-seung's friend
- Park So-yi as Kang Ha-eun, Chae Yeon-seung's daughter
- Choi Jung-won as Ryu Han-seo
- Lee Dong-ha as Kang Woo-hyun
- Ha Yoon-kyung as Chae Yeon-seung, Chae Hyun-seung's sister
- Lee Ji-hyun as Oh Wol-son
- Kang Hye-jin as Kim Ga-young
- Ahn Se-ha as Kwon Sung-yeon, one of Chae Hyun-seung's co-workers
- Yang Jo-ah as Yoo Jae-gyum
- Kim Han-na as Ahn Yoo-sun
- Kim Hye-in as Kang Soo-mi
- Kwon Han-sol as Do Ye-jin
- Kim Kwang-kyu as Kim Joong-hyuk
- Kim Min-gwi as Model
- Jeon Gook-han as Chairman Lee

== Original soundtrack ==
Part 1

Released on January 18, 2021
No.	Title	Lyrics	Music	Artist	Length
1.	"Lean on Me" (나는 그래)	Kim Ho-kyung	1601	Kim Jong-wan (Nell)	4:02
2.	"Lean on Me" (Inst.)		1601		4:02
Total length:					8:04

Part 2

Released on January 21, 2021
No.	Title	Lyrics	Music	Artist	Length
1.	"I Feel You" (만져져)	Kim Ho-kyung	1601	Sandeul (B1A4)	4:53
2.	"I Feel You" (Inst.)		1601		4:53
Total length:					9:06

Part 3

Released on February 1, 2021
No.	Title	Lyrics	Music	Artist	Length
1.	"Pit-A-Pat" (설레)	Jeon Geun-hwa (Weeky1)	Jeon Geun-hwa (Weeky1), Jo Se-hee (AIMING)	Eunha (GFriend)	3:40
2.	"Pit-A-Pat" (Inst.)		Jeon Geun-hwa (Weeky1), Jo Se-hee (AIMING)		3:40
Total length:					7:20

Part 4

Released on February 2, 2021
No.	Title	Lyrics	Music	Artist	Length
1.	"To You" (너에게)	ARTMATIC	ARTMATIC, Kiss Me Joy, 최민준	Kim Tae-woo	3:41
2.	"To You" (Inst.)		ARTMATIC, Kiss Me Joy, 최민준		3:41
Total length:					7:22

Part 5

Released on February 8, 2021
No.	Title	Lyrics	Music	Artist	Length
1.	"I Live in Your Eyes"	Tibian	Tibian, Kim Jung-woo (TOXIC)	U Sung-eun	4:12
2.	"I Live in Your Eyes" (Inst.)		Tibian, Kim Jung-woo (TOXIC)		4:12
Total length:					8:24

Part 6

Released on February 15, 2021
No.	Title	Lyrics	Music	Artist	Length
1.	"Child (Daydream)"	Song Yang-ha, Kim Jae-hyun, Lee Joo-ah	Song Yang-ha, Kim Jae-Hyun, Lee Joo-ah	CHEEZE	3:11
2.	"Child (Daydream)" (Inst.)		Song Yang-ha, Kim Jae-hyun, Lee Joo-ah		3:11
Total length:					6:22

Part 7

Released on February 22, 2021
No.	Title	Lyrics	Music	Artist	Length
1.	"Leave Me" (떠나요)	LUKA (ARTMATIC), Dope'Doug	ARTMATIC	Ben	4:14
2.	"Leave Me" (Inst.)		ARTMATIC		4:14
Total length:					8:28

== Reception ==
=== Critical response ===
Pierce Conran of the South China Morning Post gave the series 2 out of 5 stars, noting that the drama "fizzles out" and ultimately disappoints after a promising start. He criticized the show for failing to capitalize on its office setting, writing that the narrative became a "tepid" and "conventional" office romance that lacked tension. Conran particularly pointed out the "sluggish pace" of the second half, stating that the series struggled to fill its 16-episode run as the conflict between the leads became repetitive and the supporting characters remained "one-dimensional."

=== Ratings ===
Average TV viewership ratings (nationwide)
Ep.	Original broadcast date	Average audience share (Nielsen Korea)
1	January 18, 2021	2.024%
2	January 19, 2021	1.562%
3	January 25, 2021	2.427%
4	January 26, 2021	2.127%
5	February 1, 2021	1.917%
6	February 2, 2021	1.954%
7	February 8, 2021	2.079%
8	February 9, 2021	1.497%
9	February 15, 2021	1.816%
10	February 16, 2021	1.590%
11	February 22, 2021	2.007%
12	February 23, 2021	1.736%
13	March 1, 2021	1.762%
14	March 2, 2021	1.668%
15	March 8, 2021	1.614%
16	March 9, 2021	1.728%
Average		1.844%
In the table above, the blue numbers represent the lowest ratings and the red numbers represent the highest ratings.; This series aired on a cable channel/pay TV which normally has a relatively smaller audience compared to free-to-air TV/public broadcasters (KBS, SBS, MBC and EBS).

== International broadcast ==
The series is available for worldwide streaming exclusively on iQIYI at the same time as the episodes air on JTBC in South Korea, with subtitles in Chinese, English, Thai, Bahasa Malaysia, Vietnamese, Indonesian, Spanish and Arabic.
