= Jang Seong-beom =

South Korean actor (born 1995)

- 장성범
- Born: July 18, 1995 (age 31); Seoul, South Korea
- Occupation: Actor

Jang Seong-beom (Korean: 장성범; born July 18, 1995) is a South Korean actor.

== Filmography ==
=== TV Shows ===
Year	Brocasting Channel	Title	Role	Notes
2013	SBS	My Love from the Star	Hallyu fan	Minor Role
2014	KBS2	Big Man	Physician	Minor Role
2014	SBS	You're All Surrounded	Joon-Soon	Supporting Role
2014	MBC	Mr. Back	Eun Myeong-soo	Supporting Role
2014	KBS2	Healer	Lee Jong-soo	Supporting Role
2015	KBS2	Drama Special—Hair Day	Park Ki-ho	Starring
2015	KBS2	The Producers	Assistant PD of Music Bank	Supporting Role
2016	tvN	Pied Pipper	Sergeant Profiler	Supporting Role
2017	tvN	Stranger	Park Kyung-wan	Supporting Role
2017	KBS2	Black Knight: The Man Who Guards Me	Park Chul-min	Young
2018	KBS2	Marry Me Now	Park Hyo-seob	Young
2018	KBS2	Just Dance	Dance Teacher	Supporting Role
2019	OCN	Trap	Park Sung-beom	Supporting Role
2019	SBS	VAGABOND	Lee Pil-yong	Guest Appearance
2020	KBS2	Drama Special—One Night	Nam Ki-joon	Starring
2021	JTBC	Beyond Evil	Lee Sang-yeob	Guest Appearance
2022	tvN	Alchemy of Souls	Master Kang	Supporting Role
2022	ENA	Extraordinary Attorney Woo	Gwang-ho	Young
2022	ENA	Recruit	Kim Dong-woo	Starring
2022	Disney+	Shadow Detective	An Ju-yong	Supporting Role
2022	ENA	Summer Strike	Jae-Dong	Guest Appearance
2023	Disney+	Call It Love	Shim Ji-gu	Supporting Role
2023	ENA	Recruit 2	Kim Dong-woo	Starring
2024	TVING	Dongjae, the Good or the Bastard	Park Chan-hyuk	Guest Appearance
2025	MBC	Undercover High School	Park Tae-soo	Supporting Role
2025	Heavenly	Heesu in Class 2	Jong-gu	Supporting Role
2025	ENA	Recruit 3	Kim Dong-woo	Supporting Role

=== Films ===
Year	Name	Character	Notes
2013	Hwayi: A Monster Boy	Kim Yun-seok	Young Debut Work
2014	Slow Video	CCTV staff	Minor Character
2016	Detour (Film)	Yong-mi	Young
2017	The Battleship Island	Oh Jang-woo	Supporting Role
2018	On Your Wedding Day	Choi Soo-pyo	Supporting Role
2018	Default	Park-Jin	Supporting Role
2019	Sunkiss Family	Cheol-won	Starring
2023	Abroad	Taemin	Starring
2024	Following	Seong-yeol	Supporting Work
2024	Work To Do	Kang Joon-hee	Starring

== Awards and nominations ==
Year	Award Ceremony	Awards	Work	Result
2023	Bucheon International Fantastic Film Festival	Korean Fantastic Actor Award	Abroad	Won
2023	28th Busan International Film Festival	Actor of the Year	Work to Do	Won
2025	61st Baeksang Arts Awards	Best New Actor	Work to Do	Nominated
