= Ji Il-joo =

South Korean actor (born 1985)

- 지일주
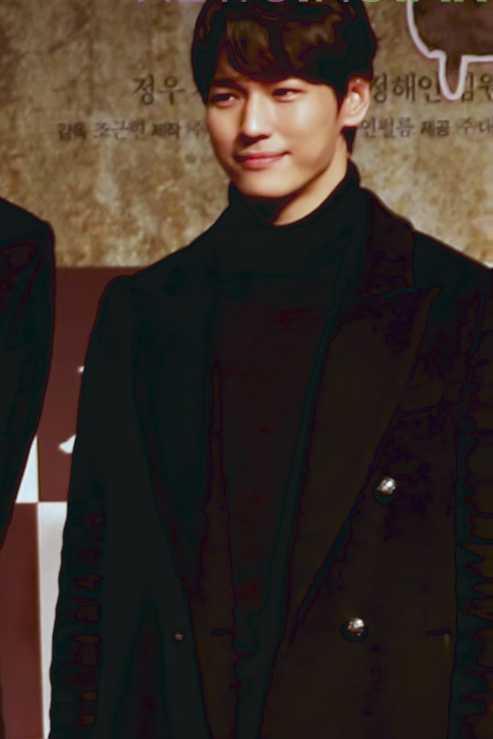
- Ji in 2018
- Born: Ji Il-joo; November 7, 1985 (age 40); Mapo-gu, Seoul, South Korea
- Occupation: Actor
- Years active: 2008–present
- Agent: UL Entertainment
- Height: 178 cm (5 ft 10 in)

Korean name
- Hangul: 지일주
- RR: Ji Ilju
- MR: Chi Ilchu

Ji Il-joo (Korean: 지일주; born November 7, 1985) is a South Korean actor. He is known for his role in the drama series Weightlifting Fairy Kim Bok-joo (2016–2017) and Hello, My Twenties! (2016)

== Directing ==
In 2018, Ji is making his debut as a director through the upcoming indie film Arrogance. Ji is also the scriptwriter and lead actor in his film.

In July 2022, Ji signed an exclusive contract with Acom My ENT.

In February 2023, Ji signed an exclusive contract with UL Entertainment.

== Filmography ==
=== Film ===
Year	Title	Role	Ref.
2023	Gangnam Zombie	Hyun-seok	

=== Television series ===
Year	Title	Role	Notes	Ref.
2008	Sister's Inlove	Bong Sang-goo		
2009	Ja Myung Go	Jum So-yi		
2009– 2010	Korean Mystery Detective Jung Yak Yong	Seo-In		
2010	OB & GY	Sanbuingwa	Cameo	
2012	Golden Time	Yoo Gang-jin		
2013	KBS TV Novel: Samsaengi	Oh Ji-sung		
2013	Basketball	Lee Hong-ki		
2014	Hotel King	Jin Jung-han		
2014– 2015	Healer	Seo Joon-seok		
2015	Make a Woman Cry	Hwang Gyeong-tae		
2016	Local Hero	Jin-woo		
2016	Dramaworld	Entregador figurante, ep 5		
2016	The Royal Gambler	Moo-myung		
2016	Hello, My Twenties!	Ko Doo-young		
2016– 2017	Weightlifting Fairy Kim Bok-joo	Jo Tae-kwon		
2017	Suspicious Partner	Jeon Sung-ho	Cameo, ep. 6	
2017	Temperature of Love	Kim Joon-ha		
2017	Individualist Ms. Ji-young	Yeon-suk	Two episode Drama Special	
2017	Argon	Park Nam-gyu		
2018	Radio Romance	Oh Jin-soo	Cameo, ep. 2	
2018	Mistress	Kwon Min-gyu		
2018	The Undateables	Bookstore owner	Cameo, ep. 5-8	
2018	Priest	Kim Joon-ho	Cameo	
2019	Go Go Song	Kang Won-hyung		
2019	Kill It	Yoon Jae-hyun		
2019	A Place in the Sun	Choi Tae-joon (young)	Cameo, ep. 1-2, 17	
2020	Hello Dracula	Jong-su		
2020	Find Me in Your Memory	Ji Hyeon-geun		
2020	Once Again	Cha Young-hoon	Cameo, ep. 1-2, 4, 22, 44	
2023	Crash Course in Romance	Jin Yi-sang		
