= Lee Ki-taek (actor) =

South Korean actor

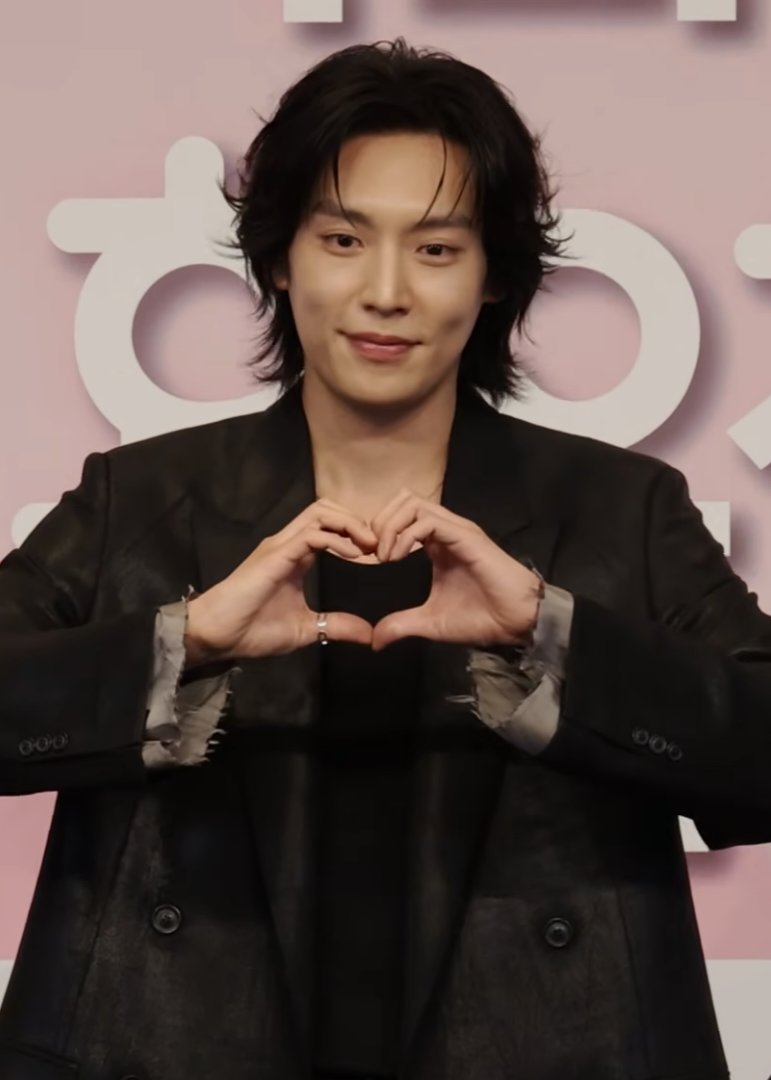
- Lee in February 2026
- Born: 26 October 1994 (age 31); Seoul, South Korea
- Other name: Lee Gi-taek
- Occupations: Actor; model
- Years active: 2019–present
- Agent: KeyEast

Korean name
- Hangul: 이기택
- RR: I Gitaek
- MR: I Kit'aek

Lee Ki-taek is a South Korean actor and model. He is known for his roles in dramas such as The Devil Judge, One Fine Week 2, Moonshine, and Three Bold Siblings.

== Career ==
In 2026, Lee starred in JTBC's romantic comedy The Practical Guide to Love opposite Han Ji-min and Park Sung-hoon. He played Shin Ji-soo.

== Filmography ==
=== Television series ===
Year	Title	Role	Ref.
2021	The Devil Judge	K	
2021	Moonshine	Tae-seon	
2022	Three Bold Siblings	Won Ji-hoon	
2023	O'PENing: Shoot Me	Seok Si-yun	
2023	My Happy Ending	Yoon Te-oh / Theo Harris	
2024	Namib	Chris	
2025	The Practical Guide to Love	Shin ji-soo	

=== Television shows ===
Year	Title	Role	Note(s)	Ref.
2026	Bonjour Bakery	Cast member		
2026	Sunim Sonim: Soul Trip in India	Cast member		

=== Web series ===
Year	Title	Role	Ref.
2020	IN-SEOUL: Season 2	Cheol Tto	
2020	One Fine Week 2	Seo Do-hyun	
2023	Bon Appetit	Lee Yoon-soo	

=== Music video appearances ===
Year	Title	Artist	Length	Ref.
2019	"Never Love Again"	Baek Ji-young	4:00	
2020	"Are You Happy"	Casey	4:00	
2020	"I Don't Want to Feel the Pain of Parting Again"	Baek Ji-young	4:00	
2020	"I Guess It's Raining Today"	Sol-ji	4:00	

== Awards and nominations ==
Name of the award ceremony, year presented, category, nominee of the award, and the result of the nomination
Award ceremony	Year	Category	Nominee / Work	Result	Ref.
Global OTT Awards	2026	Best New Actor	The Practical Guide to Love	Won	
