= Lee Ji-hyun (actress, born 1972) =

South Korean actress (born 1972)

- Born: October 20, 1972 (age 54); Seoul, South Korea
- Other name: Lee Ji-hyeon
- Education: Hongik University (Department of Education)
- Occupation: Actress
- Years active: 2000–present
- Agent: DSP Media
- Known for: Beautiful World; Thirty-Nine; All of Us Are Dead
- Spouse: Jung Seung-gil (m. 2000)

Korean name
- Hangul: 이지현
- RR: I Jihyeon
- MR: I Chihyŏn

Lee Ji-hyun (Korean: 이지현; born October 20, 1972) is a South Korean actress. She debuted in the 2003 film Six Views. She is known for her roles in dramas such as Thirty-Nine, She Would Never Know, Beautiful World and All of Us Are Dead. She also appeared in movies Solace, The Cat, If You Were Me and I'm a Cyborg, But That's OK.

== Personal life ==
During a press preview for the film Dream on April 17, 2023, actor Jeong Seung-gil revealed that Lee Ji-hyun, who plays his romantic partner Jinju, is his wife of 23 years.

== Filmography ==
=== Film ===
Year	Title		Role
Year	English	Korean	Role
2000	Mi in	미인	Writer Hyeon
2001	Running 7 Dogs	7인의 새벽	Ms. Park
2002	Boss X-File	보스 상륙 작전	Choi-ri
2002	Make It Big	일단 뛰어	Jang-soo
2003	If You Were Me	여섯 개의 시선	Nurse
2004	Bunshinsaba	분신사바	Teacher
2006	Solace	사랑할 때 이야기하는 것들	Hye-ran's business partner
2006	Bloody Reunion	스승의 은혜	Sun-hee
2006	I'm a Cyborg, But That's OK	싸이보그지만 괜찮아	Yeong-goon's aunt
2011	The Cat	고양이: 죽음을보는 두개의눈	Veterinarian
2011	Link	링크	Choi Ji-su
2011	War of the Arrows	최종병기 활	Gisaeng
2023	Dream	드림	Jin-ju
2024	Ms. Apocalypse	세기말의 사랑	Hye-ok

=== Television series ===
Year	Title	Role	Ref.
2017	The Package	Han Book-ja	
2017	Rain or Shine	Beoyng-ho's wife	
2018	Queen of Mystery 2	Lee Young-sook	
2018	Let's Eat 3	Kim Mi-sook	
2019	Beautiful World	Lim Sook-hee	
2019	Abyss	Jang Sun-young	
2019	One Spring Night	Lawyer	
2020	Dr. Romantic 2	Soon-young's mother	
2020	Hospital Playlist	Shin Mi-jin	
2020	The King: Eternal Monarch	Eun-sub's mother	
2020	Mystic Pop-up Bar	Jin-seok	
2020	Hust	Madame Kang	
2020	Hello Dracula	Mi-young	
2021	She Would Never Know	Oh Wol-sun	
2022	Thirty-Nine	Chan-young's mother	
2022	Green Mothers' Club	Jeong-suk	
2022	Love All Play	Tae-joon's mother.	
2023	My Perfect Stranger	Lee Soon-ae (in 2021)	
2023	Miraculous Brothers	Lee Soo-yeon	
2025	My Dearest Nemesis	Sin Won's mother	

=== Web series ===
Year	Title	Role	Ref.
2022	All of Us Are Dead	Cheong-san's mother	
2023	Gyeongseong Creature	Young-kwan's mother	
2025	When Life Gives You Tangerines	Bun-hui	

== Theater ==
List of stage play(s)
Year	Title		Role	Theater	Date	Ref.
Year	English	Korean	Role	Theater	Date	Ref.
2016	Theatrical Battle 6 - Kill Me Now	연극열전6 - 킬 미 나우	Robin	Chungmu Art Center Medium Theater Black	May 1–July 3	
2017	The Orphan of Jo, The Seed of Revenge	조씨고아, 복수의 씨앗	Jeong-yeong's wife	Myeongdong Art Theater	January 18–February 12	
2017	Kill Me Now	킬 미 나우	Robin	Chungmu Art Center Medium Theater Black	April 25–July 16	
2017	The Women of Troy	트로이의 여인들		Art Space Seoul	August 10–20	
2018	The Orphan of Jo, The Seed of Revenge	조씨고아, 복수의 씨앗	Jeong-yeong's wife	Myeongdong Art Theater	September 4–October 1	
2021	The Orphan of Jo, The Seed of Revenge	조씨고아, 복수의 씨앗	Jeong-yeong's wife	Myeongdong Art Theater	April 9–May 9	
2023	20th Century Blues	20세기 블루스	Gabby	Doosan Art Center Space111	May 30–June 17	
2023	The Orphan of Jo, The Seed of Revenge	조씨고아, 복수의 씨앗	Jeong-yeong's wife	Myeongdong Art Theater	November 30–December 25	
2024	Tongue of Silver	은의 혀	Jeong-eun	Hongik University Daehak-ro Art Center Small Theater	August 15–September 8	

== Awards and nominations ==
Name of the award ceremony, year presented, category, nominee of the award, and the result of the nomination
Award ceremony	Year	Category	Result	Ref.
46th Dong-A Theater Awards	2009	Best New Actress	Won	
33rd Seoul Theater Festival Acting Awards	2012	Rookie of the Year Award	Won	
