= Kim Hee-chan =

South Korean actor

- Born: December 23, 1992 (age 33); South Korea
- Education: Sejong University – Film Arts
- Occupation: Actor
- Years active: 2012–present
- Agent: Billions

Korean name
- Hangul: 김희찬
- Hanja: 金熙燦
- RR: Gim Huichan
- MR: Kim Hŭich'an

Kim Hee-Chan (born December 23, 1992) is a South Korean actor.

== Filmography ==
=== Film ===
Year	Title	Role	Notes
2012	The Green Gap		Short film
2012	Want It		Short film
2012	Real		Short film
2012	Housemate	Young-woo	Short film
2012	Night Market	Do-han	Short film
2013	Dream Dream		
2016	One Way Trip	Doo-man	
2016	I Miss You	Seo Won-suk	
2016	Life Risking Romance	Ui-kyung	
2019	Jesters: The Game Changers	Crown prince	
2020	On July 7	Hyun-soo	
2020	Boys Be!!	Seung-in	
2021	In the Name of the Son	Min-woo	

=== Television ===
Year	Title	Role	Notes
2015	The Producers	Tak Ye-joon	
2015	Second 20s	Cha Hyun-suk (young)	
2016	Cheese in the Trap	Hong Joon	
2016	Mrs. Cop 2	Kang Sang-chul	
2017	Binggoo	Jang Eun-suk	
2017	Radiant Office	Oh Jae-min	
2017	School 2017	Kim Hee-chan	
2017	Somehow 18	Jang Seul-ki	
2019	Justice	Song Dae-jin	
2023	My Lovely Boxer	Choi Ho-joong	

=== Variety shows ===
Year	Title	Network
2015	Showbiz Korea	Arirang
2016	Glory Day Movietalk Live	V App
2016	Entertainment Weekly	KBS

=== Radio shows ===
Year	Title	Network
2016	Cultwo Show	SBS Power FM
