= Tatsuji Fuse =

Japanese lawyer and activist (1880–1953)

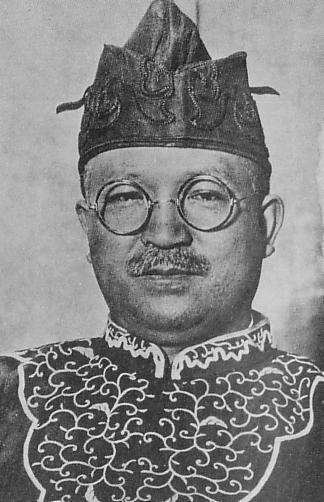
- Tatsuji Fuse in 1931
- Born: November 13, 1880; Hebita Village, Ishinomaki, Miyagi Prefecture, Empire of Japan
- Died: September 13, 1953 (aged 72)
- Occupations: lawyer, social activist
- Known for: Defending minority groups in Japan, Korean independence activist

Tatsuji Fuse (布施 辰治, Fuse Tatsuji; November 13, 1880 – September 13, 1953) was a Japanese lawyer and social activist.

Months after the beginning of his career, Fuse became disillusioned with the Japanese government and legal system. He began devoting himself to social causes and the defense of underprivileged groups in Japan. This included farmers, women, sex workers, and ethnic minorities, especially Korean people. Fuse eventually began taking hundreds of cases per year, sometimes free of charge, in defense of these groups.

Fuse is remembered fondly in Korea as a Korean independence activist and the foremost defender of the rights of Koreans during and shortly after the Japanese colonial period. He was involved in a significant proportion of historic cases involving Koreans in Japan. This includes trials surrounding the February 8 Declaration of Independence, the trials of Pak Yol and Kaneko Fumiko, and trials in the aftermath of the Kantō Massacre. His activities drew the ire of Japanese authorities; he was arrested on a number of occasions and disbarred in 1939. Soon after Japan surrendered at the end of World War II, Fuse resumed his practice of the law and defended numerous clients until his death in 1953.

In 2004, he became the first Japanese person to be awarded the Order of Merit for National Foundation by the South Korean government.

== Early life and education ==
Fuse was born in the rural Hebita Village, Oshika District (now in Ishinomaki), Miyagi Prefecture, Empire of Japan. He was the second son of farmer Eijiro Fuse (布施 榮二郞).

He attended the Jinjou Elementary School. Afterwards, he attended a traditional school, where he studied the Chinese classics. He was particularly moved by the philosophy of Mozi, although Fuse read widely from both Western and Eastern texts in his youth.

He was baptized in the Japanese Orthodox Church, and attended a seminary affiliated with the Holy Resurrection Cathedral in Tokyo, but dropped out after three months. After his marriage, he converted to his wife's faith of Nichiren Buddhism.

In 1899, he left for Tokyo to attend the Tokyo Semmon Gakko, a predecessor of Waseda University. It was around this time that he came into contact with international students, particularly Korean students. He also attended Meiji Law School, a predecessor of Meiji University, from which he graduated in 1902.

== Legal career ==
=== Career as a prosecutor ===
Fuse passed the judge's exam at the age of 22, and became an assistant prosecutor in Utsunomiya in April 1903. However, he resigned by August. In his letter of resignation, Fuse described the behavior of the prosecution as "wolf-like" in a case that he worked on, in which a mother was charged with murder after killing her child and attempting suicide.

=== Developing interest in civil rights ===
Around this time, Fuse became interested in the philosophy of Leo Tolstoy. He reportedly became so devoted, that he kept a photo of Tolstoy in his study, which he saw as a source of comfort and guidance.

In 1906, Fuse worked on his first case involving social issues. He defended socialist Yoshimi Yamaguchi (山口 義三) in a case on the number of cars in Tokyo. In 1911, he defended anarchist Kōtoku Shūsui, a participant in the High Treason Incident assassination plot on Emperor Meiji. Around this time, he also worked on a number of cases in which he advocated for universal suffrage and the decriminalization of sex work.

Beginning in the early 1910s, Fuse began expressing support for the Korean independence movement. In 1911, he wrote a paper in favor of the movement, in which he discussed the righteous armies that resisted Japan's colonization of Korea. This led to the police investigating and monitoring him.

=== Criminal lawyer ===
Fuse began taking on more and more criminal cases. He handled 190 criminal cases and 26 civil cases in 1918, and 192 and 27 in 1919. By around 1920, he had become a successful and prolific attorney; if withdrawn cases are included, Fuse handled around 250 cases per year. On average, he appeared in court around four times per day. The most he appeared in court in a single month was 135 times, and the fewest was 90 times.

Beginning in 1919, he began representing Koreans in court. That year, 60 Korean students were arrested for their role in issuing the February 8 Declaration of Independence, which was a major spark for the independence movement. Fuse defended Choe Pal-yong and Song Gye-baek in the aftermath of these arrests, which he did free of charge.

In May 1920, Fuse published a "Statement of Self-Revolution" (『自己革命の告白』), in which he expressed a desire to embrace his defence of social causes, and to transition from being a "traditional lawyer" to being "the people's lawyer". He wrote that he wished to reject the comfortable and affluent life that most lawyers adopted, and instead live alongside regular people. He wrote: (Note: Japanese: 人間誰でもどのような生き方をするのがよいかについて、正直な自分の声を聞かなければならない。これは良心の声である。私はその声に従って厳粛に『自己革命』を宣言する。)

Everyone must listen to their inner voice about the kind of life that they would like to live. This is the voice of conscience. I heed the call of that voice, and solemnly declare a 'self-revolution'.

Fuse began offering free legal consultations and lecturing on various issues on behalf of the socially disadvantaged. He also wrote a wide variety of essays on both legal and social matters.

In July 1923, Fuse visited Korea for the first time, in order to participate in a "Summer Lecture Tour" sponsored by the newspaper The Dong-A Ilbo. He said of this, "My coming to Korea [...] was not to view its landscape, for my main goal was to connect with the feelings of the Korean people". He was warmly welcomed by a crowd of people at Seoul Station. At his welcoming party, he spoke in favor of a proletarian revolution in Korea. His first lecture was in Seoul on August 1, and he lectured around 10 times in the south of the peninsula, until August 12. He also submitted written statements on behalf of the defence of independence activist and member of the Heroic Corps Kim Si-hyeon, who was being tried in the Seoul District Court.

=== Kantō Massacre ===
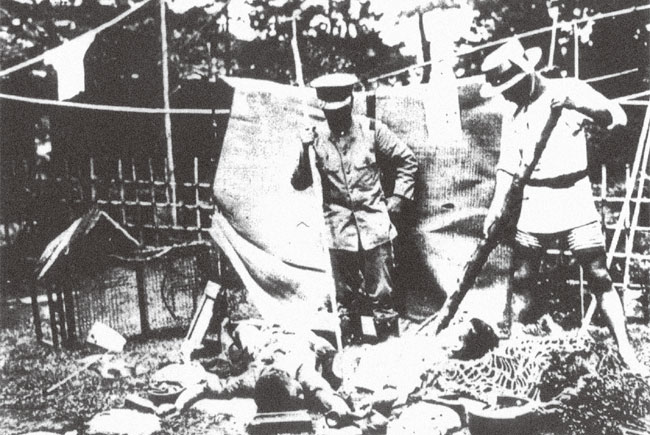
A lynching during the massacre (1923)

Shortly after Fuse returned to Japan, the Great Kantō earthquake occurred. Immediately after the earthquake, false rumors were spread that Koreans were taking advantage of the chaos to commit crimes. This resulted in the Kantō Massacre, in which thousands of Koreans were hunted, lynched, and killed. Fuse protested the killings and demanded an investigation be opened into it. He joined a support organization for the survivors in Tokyo.

In December, Fuse delivered a speech at a memorial ceremony for the massacre, in which he angrily criticized the Japanese government and police for their role in the killings. He said: (Note: Korean: 『생각하면 생각할수록 너무나도 무서운 인생의 비극입니다. 특히, 그중에는 조선에서 온 동포의 마지막을 생각할 때, 저는 애도할 말이 없습니다. 또 어떤 말로 추도하더라도 조선동포 6000의 영령은 만족하지 않을 것입니다. 그들을 슬퍼하는 1000만 개의 추도의 말을 늘어놓더라도 무념에 가득 찬 그 사람들의 마지막을 추도할 수 없을 것입니다』)

The more I think about it, the more terrifying this tragedy is. I am at a loss for words, especially when I think of the last moments our compatriots from Korea experienced. No matter what words we use, there is nothing that could put to rest the souls of our 6,000 Korean compatriots. Even ten million words of condolences would fail to eulogize their unthinkable final moments.

In 1926, upon his second visit to Korea, he sent letters of apology to The Dong-A Ilbo and The Chosun Ilbo on behalf of Japanese people for the massacre. Decades later, in 1947, he wrote a book on the massacre entitled The Truth of the White Terror After the Great Kantō Earthquake (『關東大震災白色テロルの眞相』).

=== Further legal activities ===
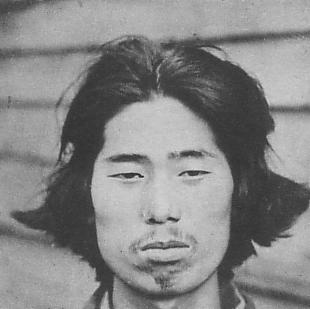
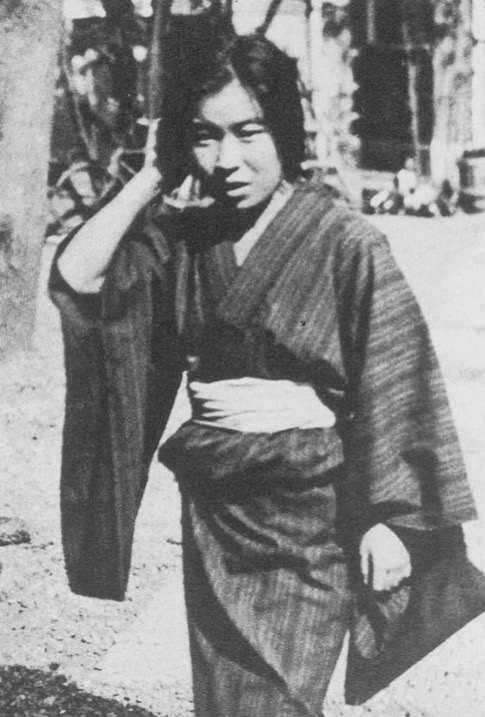
Anarchists Pak Yol and Kaneko Fumiko

Afterwards, he was heavily involved in the trial of the Korean anarchist Pak Yol and his Japanese partner Kaneko Fumiko, who were charged with high treason. Pak and Kaneko wished to marry while in prison, so Fuse officiated the ceremony. After Kaneko died while serving her life sentence, Fuse acquired her remains and sent them to Korea to be buried. Fuse and Pak became friends; Fuse later wrote a biography of Pak entitled Pak Yol, Victor of Destiny (『運命の勝利者朴烈』) after the liberation of Korea. The book was eventually turned into a film in 2017.

In 1924, he defended Heroics Corps member Kim Ji-seop. In 1926, he investigated the murder of two Koreans in the Kinomoto Incident.

By this point, Fuse was well known amongst Koreans in need in both Japan and Korea. Pak Yol had written about Fuse in his magazine, in which he described Fuse as a "friend of the proletariat and traitor to the lawyers". Farmers in Korea sent representatives to Japan to consult with Fuse on the issue of Japanese colonial policies on land ownership and taxation. In response, Fuse visited Korea for a second time from March 2 to 11, 1926. He was again enthusiastically received. He gathered evidence in support of the farmers, conducted a significant number of interviews, and gave lectures on various topics. This visit sparked pushback from the local Japanese authorities. There is now a memorial in Gungsam-myeon, Naju that thanks Fuse for his efforts.

In September 1927, he visited Korea for around a week to defend Pak Hon-yong and other members of the Communist Party of Korea. During and around these trials, he criticized the Japanese government. Even in Japan, he met with Yuasa Kurahei to express his dissatisfaction with the Governor-General of Chōsen. He visited Korea again, for what would be the last time, in December for the case. In spite of his efforts, all but twelve of his clients were found guilty.

=== Arrests and disbarment ===
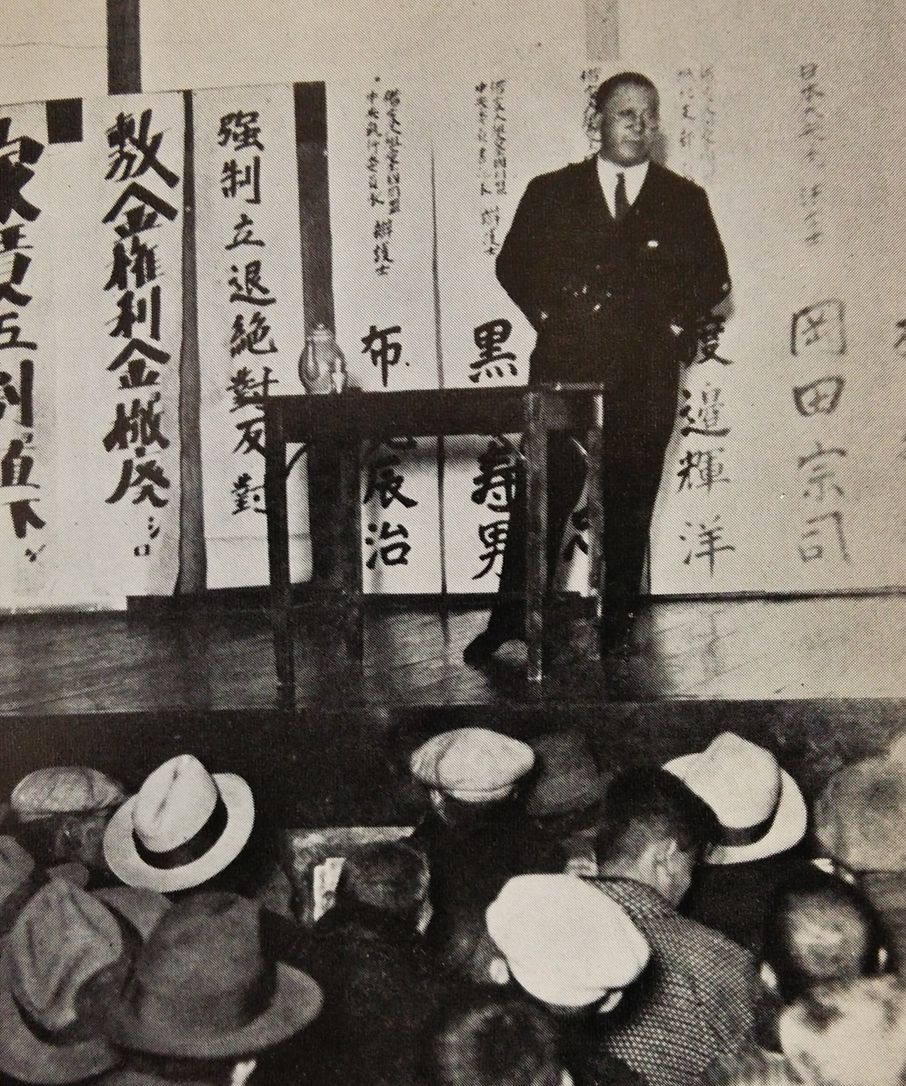
Fuse, circa 1929

In 1928, Fuse joined the left-wing Labour-Farmer Party. He ran as a left-wing candidate in the 1928 general election, but was unsuccessful. Thereafter, he represented the Japan Communist Party in the wake of the March 15 incident and April 16 incident. This resulted in his indictment in 1929. In 1932, he was put through a disciplinary trial by the Supreme Court of Judicature.

In 1933, he was indicted again for violating laws related to printing publications, and was sentenced to three months in prison. Shortly after his release, he was again arrested during mass arrests of members of the Japanese Labor and Farmers' Lawyer Association. In 1939, he was convicted of violating the Peace Preservation Law by the Supreme Court of Japan, and sentenced to imprisonment and the loss of his bar license. He was kept at Chiba Prison for a year. His third son, Morio, was later arrested under this same law in 1944, and died in prison as a result. After his release, Fuse investigated rural communities in Japan and wrote on Japanese proletariats.

=== Return to legal work ===
Fuse resumed the practice of law after August 1945, when Japan surrendered to the Allies. He received a bar license and took up cases in defense of Zainichi Koreans. He defended them in the aftermaths of the 1948 Hanshin Education Incident and the 1952 Bloody May Day incident. Until his death, he remained involved in a significant proportion of all major cases involving Koreans in Japan.

He served as part of the defense team for the Mitaka incident in 1949.

== Death and legacy ==
He died of cancer in 1953. His funeral was attended by a significant number of Koreans. His remains are interred at the temple of Jozai-ji in Toshima, Tokyo. Reportedly written on his tombstone is the phrase: "If you must live, live with the people, if you must die, die for the people". (Note: Japanese: 『生きべくんば民衆とともに、死すべくんば民衆のために』)

In 2004, he was posthumously award the South Korean Order of Merit for National Foundation. He was the first Japanese national in history to receive this honor.

Fuse is remembered fondly in South Korea. Lee Gyu-su (이규수), writing for the Monthly Chosun, claimed that Fuse has been called the "Japanese Schindler", after Oskar Schindler, who assisted Jewish people in Nazi Germany.

== See also ==
- List of Korean independence activists#Non-Korean activists
- Soda Kaichi – a Japanese social worker that raised Korean orphans
