= Kim Jun-han =

South Korean actor

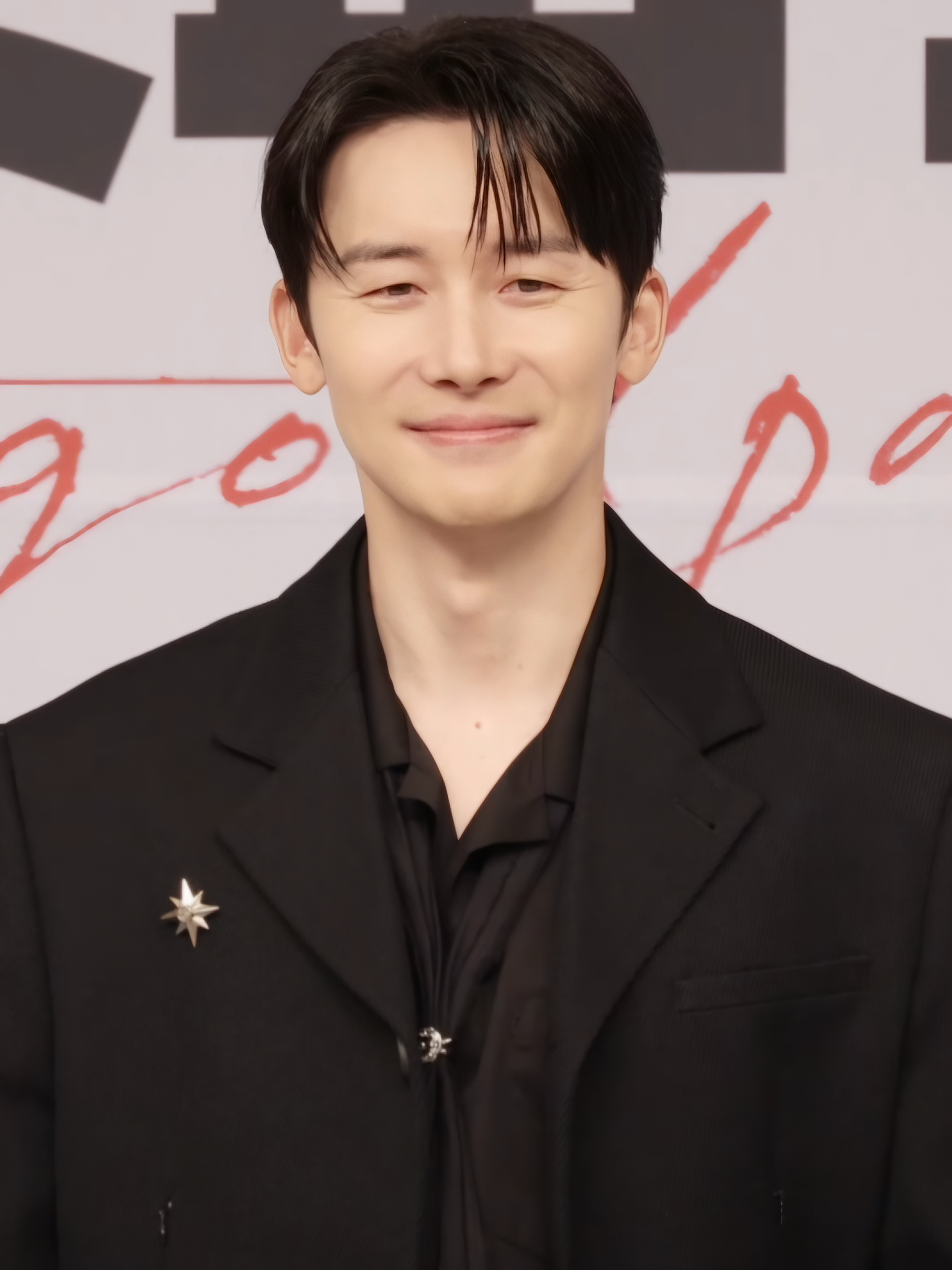
- Kim in July 2024
- Born: March 29, 1983 (age 43); Changwon, South Gyeongsang Province, South Korea
- Other name: Kim Joon-han
- Education: Woosong Information College
- Occupations: Actor; film director; screenwriter
- Years active: 2004–present
- Agent: Artist Company

Korean name
- Hangul: 김준한
- RR: Gim Junhan
- MR: Kim Chunhan

Kim Jun-han (Korean: 김준한; born March 29, 1983) is a South Korean actor, film director, screenwriter, and former musician. Kim embarked on his acting journey with director Jang Kwon-ho's film Navigation (2014). He fully committed himself to an acting career in 2017 where he starred in several movies as supporting roles, including in Kim Seong-hun's Confidential Assignment (2017), Lee Joon-ik's film Anarchist from Colony (2017), Ryoo Seung-wan's historical film The Battleship Island (2017), Min Kyu-dong's Her Story (2018), Lee Joon-ik's Sunset in My Hometown (2018), and Woo Min-ho's The Drug King (2018).

== Early life ==
Kim was born on March 29, 1983, and raised in Changwon, South Gyeongsang Province, (Note: He was born in Masan, which was originally a city from 1949 until 2010 when it was incorporated into Changwon (capital of South Gyeongsang Province) and divided into two districts, Masanhappo-gu and Masanhoewon-gu. Because of this, it is said that whoever was born in Masan was consequently born in Changwon (because their birthplace and/or residence is currently within Changwon, that is, if they are said to be born in Masan, they are said to have been born in either Masanhappo-gu or Masanhoewon-gu, current districts of Changwon and formerly one city, Masan). In his case however it is unknown which of the two districts (Masanhappo-gu or Masanhoewon-gu) is his birthplace.) where he lived until he graduated from high school. He is only son of an elementary school teacher. From a young age, Kim showed an interest in music and expressed his desire to pursue it further while still in high school. Initially, his father resisted the idea, leading to a month-long disagreement between them. However, his father eventually advised him to fully commit and pursue music seriously if that was his passion.

== Career ==
=== 2005–2007: Career as drummer in Izi Band ===
Kim Jun-han started on his music career as drummer in a school band during high school. It was 2003. He then worked as the drummer for four-members band Izi, alongside Oh Jin-seong, Lee Dong-won, and Shin Seung-ik. The band made their official debut with their first album titled "Modern Life... And... With izi...." on April 19, 2005. They gained significant recognition for their popular song "Emergency Room," which was the theme song for the 2005 drama Sassy Girl Chun-hyang. Izi's activities came to a halt after the release of digital single 'Father' in 2007.

After leaving Izi in 2007, Kim made a living by performing on stage as a drummer at other singers' performances and by participating as a drum session during recordings. He also worked part-time distributing cosmetics at a department store.

=== 2010–2016: Early career as actor ===
Kim contemplated pursuing acting and held a modest belief that he would eventually make appearances in movies or dramas. In 2010, a close stylist friend introduced him to actor Go Jun, from whom Kim received acting lessons.

"I have never properly studied acting. That’s why Go Jun feels like an acting teacher to me. He always told me, who was an unknown actor, that (he as) my older brother should develop his acting skills first and that he should be well prepared because he never knew when an opportunity would come. I learned from his older brother's perseverance."

It was in his late 20s, after military service, Kim started his acting career. He appeared in short films in 2012 and auditioned without a manager. When Go Jun landed a role in the film Tazza: The Hidden Card, Kim worked as Go Jun's manager and even received a salary from him.

Kim and Go Jun also collaborated on a short film titled "Frog" (Hyundoga) in 2015, which they co-directed.

In 2016, Kim starred in the independent film "Greet." The film tells the story of seven friends who come together in their thirties to share pleasant and heartfelt stories. It gained attention when all seven actors received the Actor Award at the 16th Jeonbuk Independent Film Festival, and it further entices the audience by revealing that the actors themselves participated in the scriptwriting process. The film also received an invitation to the 17th Daejeon Independent Film Festival. It was later released in theaters in May 2018. Until 2017, Kim worked in about 30 short films.

=== 2016–present: Breakout role ===
Afterward, Kim was chosen by directors who were seeking new actors fluent in Japanese. He appeared in Ryoo Seung-wan's historical film The Battleship Island as Japanese soldier. Filming for the movie took place from June 17, 2016, in Cheongju, and concluded on December 20, 2016. In the same year, based on a recommendation from Kim In-woo, whom he had met during the filming of The Battleship Island, Kim auditioned for director Lee Joon-ik's film Anarchist from Colony. Choi Hee-seo, the female lead, saw him and actively recommended him to the director. Prior to Anarchist from Colony, Kim had already worked in around 30 short films.

On January 18, 2017, Kim made his official debut in commercial film with the release of Confidential Assignment, directed by Kim Seong-hun. He played a minor role as an NIS agent. Shortly after, on June 28, 2017, director Lee Joon-ik's film Anarchist from Colony was released. In the film, Kim portrayed Datemas Kaisei, an examining Japanese judge who undergoes a transformation in his beliefs during the interrogation of the anarchist and revolutionary Park Yeol (Lee Je-hoon) and his lover Kaneko Fumiko (Choi Hee-seo). Kim Jun-han garnered significant attention alongside the main characters, Lee Je-hoon and Choi Hee-seo, capturing the interest of both the audience and industry professional, leading to his nomination for the Rookie of the Year Award at the 38th Blue Dragon Film Awards. His impressive fluency in Japanese language also left a lasting impression on the audiences.

"I had the opportunity to perform in Japan while working in a band before. I also had to record in Japanese and appear at festivals and radio broadcasts. I thought I couldn't just go, so I started studying Japanese a few months before I went, and I found it fun. I was doing it little by little and it turned out to be a good opportunity. I'm not that good at Japanese, however I can have basic conversations and travel alone."

Prior to the release of The Battleship Island on July 26, 2017, Kim signed an exclusive contract with CL&Company on July 5, 2017. Around the same time, he ventured into the world of dramas tvN's Prison Playbook (2017), directed by Shin Won-ho. In the series, he portrayed the character Song Ji-won, love interest of Haerongi Hanyang (Lee Kyu-hyung). The first script reading of the cast was held on July 17, 2017. It aired on tvN from November 22, 2017, to January 18, 2018, every Wednesday and Thursday for 16 episodes. Kim's performances received praise from viewers, and his work in 2017 earned him a spot in the 2018 Cine21 Rising Star Actors feature.

Directors Min Kyu-dong was also searching for actors fluent in Japanese for his film Herstory for the role of Lee Sang-il, a Korean-Japanese lawyer in the. Lee Sang-il was hired by Kim Hee-ae to represented the grandmothers in the comfort women trial in Japan, acted by veteran actresses such as, Kim Hae-sook, Ye Soo-jung, Moon Sook, Lee Yong-nyeo. Kim was chosen for the role.

He reunited with director Lee Joon-ik and made a brief but impactful appearance in the film "Sunset in My Hometown" as Won-joon, a character who spoke in the Jeolla-do dialect. Won-joon is a local newspaper reporter who feels inferior compared to Hak-soo (Park Jung-min).

Then Kim played a role as Kim In-gu's (Jo Jung-suk) right-hand man in director Woo Min-ho's The Drug King.

Kim underwent an acting transformation through antagonistic roles in two television series: MBC's Time (2018) and OCN's Quiz of God: Reboot (2018) respectively. In his first lead role in MBC's Time, Kim played Shin Min-seok, the long-time lover of Seol Ji-hyeon (Seohyun). After becoming a prosecutor, Shin Min-seok becomes a lawyer for W Group, where he oversees Cheon Soo-ho (Kim Jung-hyun), a troublemaking third-generation chaebol. In OCN's Quiz of God: Reboot (2018), Kim Jun-han portrays forensic expert Kwak Hyuk-min, known for his calm demeanor and commanding presence.

In the end of summer in the same year, Kim joined Beasts Clawing at Straws, neo-noir black comedy crime thriller film written and directed by Kim Yong-hoon. Principal photography began on August 30, 2018, and filming ended on November 30. Kim acted as Jae-hoon.

Kim joined the MBC drama One Spring Night in 2019, written by Kim Eun and directed by Ahn Pan-seok. In the series, he portrayed Kwon Ki-seok, a successful bank audit department manager who seemed to have a perfect life due to his privileged upbringing. However, his pride-driven indifference towards his ex-girlfriend Lee Jeong-in (Han Ji-min), led to their breakup. As the story progressed, his obsession with Lee Jeong-in grew, causing conflicts with Yoo Ji-ho (Jung Hae-in), her new love interest. It aired from May 22 to July 11, 2019, and Kim's acting received positive recognition from viewers who felt a mix of sympathy and dislike towards his character. He was nominated for the Excellence Award at the 2019 MBC Drama Awards.

In 2019, Kim reunited with director Shin Won-ho in Lee Woo-jung's medical drama, Hospital Playlist. Kim Jun-han takes on the role of Ahn Chi-hong, a resident in the neurosurgery department who carries unreciprocated affection for his professor, Doctor Chae Song-hwa (Jeon Mi-do). Within the storyline, he becomes entangled in a love triangle involving Lee Ik-jun (Jo Jung-suk). The first season aired on tvN every Thursday from March 12 to May 28, 2020. As a nod to Kim, director Shin Won-ho incorporated Kim's song "Emergency Room" into the drama.

In subsequent year, Kim reunited with Jung Woo-sung in his directorial debut film A Man of Reason, with principal photography starting on February 10, 2020. Kim portrayed the character Seong-jun, the second-in-command of an organization plagued by an inferiority complex. In the same year, Kim's contract with CL&Company was expired in June 2020. Kim signed an exclusive contract with Hodu&U Entertainment in July 2020.

In 2021, Kim reprise his role as Ahn Chi-hong and made a special appearance in second season of Hospital Playlist. The second season aired between June 17 and September 16, 2021.

In the end of summer of the same year, Kim participated in the Coupang Play original web series Anna, written and directed by Lee Joo-young. He portrays the character Choi Ji-hoon, who is the husband of Yumi (Bae Suzy). Choi Ji-hoon is an ambitious and driven individual, and the CEO of a promising venture company that he established at a young age. Filming of the series began on October 15, 2021 and concluded on March 23, 2022. His portrayal earned him nominations for Best Supporting Actor awards from 59th Baeksang Arts Awards and 2nd Blue Dragon Series Awards.

Kim attended the world premiere of A Man of Reason at the 2022 Toronto International Film Festival on September 13, 2022. The film was later released in theaters in South Korea on August 15, 2023. Prior to that, in August 2022, Kim concluded his contract with Hodu&U Entertainment after two years and became a free agent. Subsequently, on October 31, 2022, Kim signed with Artist Company, an agency founded by Jung Woo-sung and Lee Jung-jae.

== Personal life ==
Kim led an acting study group that he founded with fellow actors, including Choi Hee-seo, Bae Ki-gi, and Yoon Seul, who had previously worked together in Anarchist from Colony. The group would meet once a week to discuss movies and acting. Director Lee Joo-young of Anna affectionately refers to Kim "Yeonba," which means a fool who only cares about acting. Kim always talks about acting and doesn't pay much attention to other things. Even Kim's younger colleagues, view him as somewhat lacking in other aspects besides acting.

== Filmography ==
Key
†	Denotes films that have not yet been released

=== Feature film ===
Year	Title	Role	Notes	Ref.
2014	Navigation (내비게이션)	Ending man	Debut	
2016	Greet (마중: 커피숍 난동 수다 사건)	Joon-han	Also Screenwriter	
2017	Confidential Assignment	National Intelligence Service agent	Commercial film debut	
2017	Anarchist from Colony	Datemas Kaisei		
2017	The Battleship Island	Japanese soldier		
2018	Herstory	Lee Sang-il		
2018	Sunset in My Hometown	Won-joon		
2018	Drug King	Jang Woo-hyung		
2019	The King's Letters	Crown Prince Moonjong		
2020	Beasts Clawing at Straws	Jae-hoon		
2022	A Man of Reason	Seong-joon		
2024	Revolver	Shin Dong-ho		
2024	Mission: Cross	Kim Jung-san	Cameo	
2026	The Intern	Gu Young-hwan		

=== Short film ===
Year	Title	Role	Notes	Ref.
2013	I'm Fine (아임파인)	Jung-han		
2013	Hello Stranger (헬로 스트레인저)	Jung-han		
2015	Cocoon (Go-chi) (고치)	Chul-gu	Animated short film	
2015	Frog (현도가)	Hyeon-do	Short film (as director)	

=== Television series ===
Year	Title	Role	Notes	Ref.
2017	Prison Playbook	Song Ji-won		
2018	The Time	Shin Min-seok		
2018	Quiz of God 5: Reboot	Kwak Hyun-min		
2019	One Spring Night	Kwon Ki-seok		
2020–2021	Hospital Playlist	Ahn Chi-hong	Recurring role in Season 1 Cameo in Season 2	
2022	Anna	Choi Ji-hoon		
2024	Good Partner	Jung Woo-jin		
2025	Newtopia	Aaron Park		
2026	Mad Concrete Dreams	Min Hwal-seong		
TBA	When the Day Breaks †			

== Accolades ==
=== Awards and nominations ===
Name of the award ceremony, year presented, category, nominee of the award, and the result of the nomination
Award ceremony	Year	Category	Nominee / Work	Result	Ref.
Baeksang Arts Awards	2018	Best New Actor — Film	Anarchist from Colony	Nominated	
Baeksang Arts Awards	2023	Best Supporting Actor – Television	Anna	Nominated	
Blue Dragon Film Awards	2017	Best New Actor	Anarchist from Colony	Nominated	
Blue Dragon Series Awards	2023	Best Supporting Actor	Anna	Nominated	
Buil Film Awards	2017	Best New Actor	Anarchist from Colony	Nominated	
Buil Film Awards	2018	Best New Actor	Herstory	Nominated	
Chunsa Film Art Awards	2018	Best New Actor	Anarchist from Colony	Nominated	
Chunsa Film Art Awards	2019	Best New Actor	Herstory	Nominated	
Grand Bell Awards	2017	Best New Actor	Anarchist from Colony	Nominated	
Jeonbuk Independent Film Festival	2016	Best Actor	Greet	Won	
Korea-China International Film Festival	2018	Best Supporting Actor	Herstory	Won	
MBC Drama Awards	2018	Excellence Award, Actor in a Wednesday-Thursday Miniseries	The Time	Nominated	
MBC Drama Awards	2019	Excellence Award, Actor in a Wednesday-Thursday Miniseries	One Spring Night	Nominated	
The Seoul Awards	2018	Best New Actor	Anarchist from Colony	Nominated	

=== Listicles ===
Name of publisher, year listed, name of listicle, and placement
Publisher	Year	Listicle	Placement	Ref.
Cine21	2018	Rising Star Actors in Korean Films in 2018	Placed	
