= Kinomoto Incident =

1923 lynching of Koreans in Japan

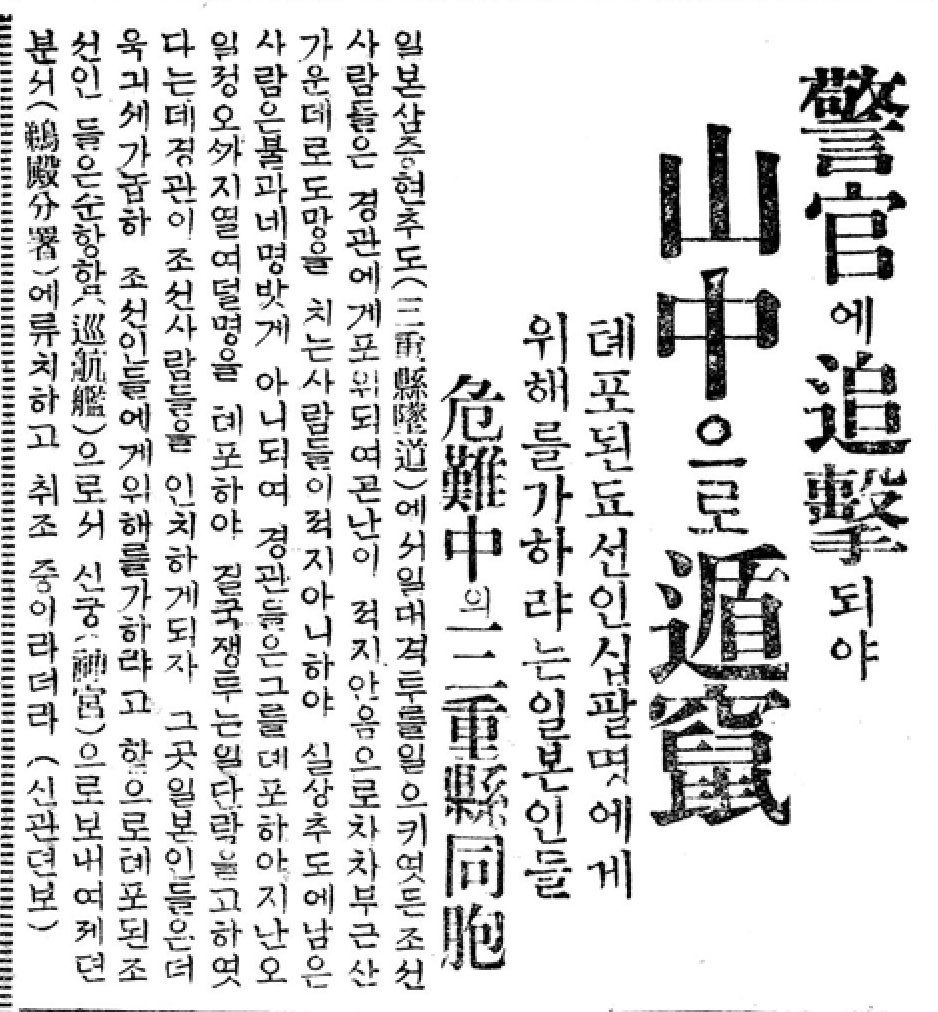
An article in The Dong-a Ilbo about the incident (January 7, 1926)

The Kinomoto Incident (木本事件, Kinomoto jiken), or the Mie Prefecture Korean Murder Incident (미에현 조선인 학살사건; 三重縣 朝鮮人 虐殺事件) refers to the lynching and murders of two ethnic Koreans in Japan that took place in Kinomoto-chō, Minamimuro District, Mie Prefecture, Empire of Japan on January 3, 1926.

== History ==
Around the time of the incident, a number of Japanese and 47 Korean workers had been constructing a tunnel in the area. Thirteen other Korean family members stayed in a bunkhouse nearby. On January 2, 1926, a Korean and a drunk Japanese person got into an argument at the local movie theater. The Japanese person drew a sword and severely wounded the Korean.

On January 3, a group of Koreans was seen at a local shrine in the town. A rumor began circulating amongst the Japanese townspeople that the Koreans were coming for revenge with dynamite (from the tunnel construction).

By request of the local police, a local military association, youth group, and firefighters armed themselves with bamboo spears and hunting rifles, and went to areas where Korean workers were staying. Some Koreans fled into the partially-constructed tunnel for safety. Japanese workers were confused with Koreans, and were similarly attacked. Around 5 p.m., Yi Kiyun (이기윤; 李基允; aged 25) reportedly ran in the opposite direction of the tunnel, where other workers and his family were, in order to give them the chance to escape. Yi was reportedly unarmed. He was surrounded, and shot in the head in the middle of the street. Some Koreans fled from the tunnel, and around 60 fled into the mountains.

After the sun set, the attackers regrouped, and moved to search the mountains for the remaining Koreans. The Koreans counterattacked with dynamite. After briefly retreating, the attackers chased after and shot at the Koreans. Around 7 p.m., Pae Sangdo (배상도; 裵相度, aged 29) was killed. He had also been unarmed.

One of those killed was speared in the head, and dragged through the town center. Their bodies were left in the street for three days, and came to "resemble beehives" due to being stabbed numerous times. They were put in the graveyard of the local temple Gokuraku-ji (極楽寺), covered with straw mats, and abandoned for several days. They were eventually buried, and four-character Dharma names (戒名) were created for them and written on their tombstones (春雪信士 and 秋相信士). There are few records of injuries to other Koreans, except for one documenting a serious injury, but scholars think that some were injured during the fighting.

== Arrests and trials ==
In the immediate aftermath, the attackers explained to the local police that the Koreans had been unruly and stole food and goods. Five were commended for aiding the police in the investigation, and no punishments were issued towards them.

Until January 6, the attackers and police coordinated in arresting and interrogating around 50 Koreans. On January 7, 20 were charged with sedition and put on a preliminary hearing, which eventually concluded by May 3. The remaining 30 were sent to Toba for further processing. Arrests of the Japanese attackers began on January 10, and continued for two days. Twenty were interrogated, and five were detained. In total, 15 Korean and 17 Japanese people were brought to trial. The Japanese lawyer Tatsuji Fuse, famously sympathetic to Koreans in Japan, defended the Koreans.

On October 30, the court announced its verdict. Koreans Kim Myŏng-ku (김명구; 金明九) received three years in prison, Yun Chŏng-chin (윤정진) two years, and Yi To-sul (이도술; 李道述) and Yu Sang-pŏm (유상범; 兪相範) each received a year and six months in prison. The remaining Koreans were released. Japanese people Michihara Sōshi (桃原增市) and three others received two years in prison, and ten others were sentenced to six months and prison and three years of probation.

Regardless of whether they had been charged or convicted, all Koreans were fired and expelled from the area. On the other hand, local Kinomoto organizations provided living expenses and legal fees for the Japanese people on trial.

== Legacy ==
The incident outraged Koreans in Japan and Korea. Korean newspapers called for labor and civil rights for Koreans in Japan.

Afterwards, the incident was largely forgotten about. Beginning around the late 1980s, a local civic group began advocating for the creation of a memorial to the deceased Koreans. Adachi Tomonori (足立知典), head of the local temple Gokuraku-ji, had grown up in Kinomoto-chō and had never heard of the incident until he stumbled upon it during unrelated research. Using his own money, he ordered two replacement tombstones from Korea, with the Korean names of the deceased written on them (in Hanja). The monument was completed on November 20, 1994.

The incident has been compared to other acts of anti-Korean violence in Japan. This notably includes the 1923 Fukuda Village Incident and wider Kantō Massacre, which occurred around two and a half years before the Kinomoto Incident.
