= Anarchist from Colony =

- Theatrical release poster
- Hangul: 박열
- Hanja: 朴烈
- RR: Bak Yeol
- MR: Pak Yŏl
- Directed by: Lee Joon-ik
- Written by: Hwang Seong-gu
- Produced by: Kim Sung-cheol
- Starring: Lee Je-hoon; Choi Hee-seo
- Cinematography: Park Sung-joo
- Edited by: Kim Jung-hoon
- Music by: Bang Jun-seok; Kang Eun-koo
- Distributed by: Megabox Plus M
- Release date: June 28, 2017
- Running time: 129 minutes
- Country: South Korea
- Languages: Korean; Japanese
- Box office: US$16.9 million

Anarchist from Colony (Korean: 박열), also known as Park Yeol, is a 2017 South Korean biographical period comedy film directed by Lee Joon-ik about the life of independence activist Pak Yŏl, with Lee Je-hoon taking on the title role. It premiered in South Korea on June 28, 2017.

== Plot ==
Park Yeol (Pak Yŏl) is the leader of the anarchist group Bulryeongsa, which has 14 Korean and five Japanese members. He seems like an easygoing, courageous and disobedient young man who never troubles others. His partner Fumiko is a strong and intelligent woman who appears to be positive with a sense of humor. The film shows the anarchist group Heukdohoe (which goes by multiple names) discussing their methods for resisting the Japanese harassment against Koreans. Park Yeol, as the leader of this group, plots a bombing against Prince Hirohito. Then, the Kanto Earthquake of 1923 hits Japan, leaving the city in ruin. In the film, Former Minister of Affairs Mizuno suggests that Koreans had been poisoning water wells and setting the city on fire following the earthquake. He promotes an idea that Japanese patriots go out and enact revenge; it is highly hinted at that he only wants this to enact revenge against Koreans following the March First Movement, where Korean anarchists made a rebellious stance against Japanese imperialism.

Following this, the Kanto Massacre occurs, where over 6000 Koreans were massacred by Japanese vigilantes. In order to cover up the massacre, Mizuno focusses on Yeol and his organization's activities. Because they are self-proclaimed anarchists, he looks to trying them for crimes against Japan to minimize discussions about the massacre, eventually focusing on Yeol's plot against Hirohito. The following trial highlights how Yeol and Kaneko made a mockery of the Japanese government and imperialist ways. They discuss their desire for the Japanese people to become disillusioned from the imperial family's godly power over the nation. They note that in this way, equality between classes and peoples can occur; they also discuss how they are well aware their trial is meant to cover up the Korean Massacre and will do everything they can to prevent this. Underlying these beliefs are the intense moments of their companionship and love that center on their shared desire for revolution.

The film ends showing the guilty verdict Kaneko and Yeol faced, and how they narrowly avoided the death sentence. Once the two are separated, Kaneko mysteriously dies in prison from supposed suicide, though none of the Heukdohoe believe this—they fully believe she was murdered. They go to retrieve her body, and Yeol is said to have been released from prison after occupation ended in 1946. The final shot shows the film's picture of Yeol and Kaneko and then the real one fading out to black.

== Cast ==
- Lee Je-hoon as Park Yeol
- Choi Hee-seo as Kaneko Fumiko
- Min Jin-woong as Hong Jin-yoo
- Kwon Yul as Lee Seok
- Baek Soo-jang as Choi Young-hwan
- Bae Je-gi as Choi Gyoo-jong
- Kim In-woo as Mizuno Rentarō
- Kim Jun-han as Datemas Kaisei
- Tasuku Yamanouchi as Tatsuji Fuse
- Wi Ha-joon as Korean youth in prison
- Kim Sung-cheol as Fumio Koto.

== Background ==
The film is based on the true story of the anarchist and revolutionary Pak Yŏl (Lee Je-hoon), who organizes the anarchist group Futei-sha (in Korean "Heukdohoe"), which planned to assassinate Japan's Crown Prince Hirohito during Japanese colonial rule of the Korean Peninsula. The movie also highlights the relationship between Park and his lover Kaneko Fumiko (Choi Hee-seo), a Japanese nihilist who sympathized with Koreans oppressed under Japanese rule.

The Kanto Massacre that took the lives of over 6000 Koreans began from rumors the Hongō Komagome police heard about Koreans poisoning wells and starting fires.

Korean anarchism is largely understood as a reaction to the Japanese imperialism and anarchist ideas coming from Chinese and Japanese students. Korean anarchism always placed freedom from Japanese imperialism first. As nationalism influenced anarchism so did the ideology of socialist revolution creating a more equal world.

== Production ==
=== Conception and screenplay ===
Director Lee Joon-ik stated that he first encountered the figure of Park Yeol and became deeply intrigued by him while conducting research for the 2000 film Anarchists, during which he learned about many unsung independence activists. He subsequently conducted further research based on Shoji Yamada's Biography of Kaneko Fumiko, requesting articles from major Japanese media outlets—such as the Asahi Shimbun and Sankei Shimbun—regarding the actual trials faced by Park Yeol and Fumiko. Explaining his meticulous attention to historical accuracy, Director Lee noted, "Since they were real people, I felt it was more important to create a film faithful to their values and lives rather than simply adding entertainment value." He also mentioned that he wanted the film to be credible to Japanese audiences, adding, "Through historical accuracy, I wanted to portray a human being who confronts the contradictions and injustices of Japanese imperialism using reason and logic."

=== Filming ===
With a net production budget of 2.6 billion won, Anarchist from Colony (originally titled Park Yeol) is considered a low-budget film. This was a deliberate choice by Director Lee Joon-ik; the story of Park Yeol and Fumiko was not intended to be a visual spectacle, but rather a work that conveyed the sincerity of the individual characters. Lee explained, "I could have depicted the earthquake on a grand scale, but doing so might have hindered the audience from connecting with the protagonists' inner lives." Filming took place over six weeks, spanning a total of 24 shooting days. Although the film is set primarily in Tokyo, Japan, not a single scene was shot on location there.

=== Casting ===
Lee Je-hoon was cast as Park Yeol, the film's protagonist and the character for whom the movie is named. Director Lee Joon-ik remarked that "the nervous tension Lee Je-hoon feels as an actor resonates with the fiery passion possessed by Park Yeol." It was Choi Hee-seo who recommended Lee Je-hoon for the role of Park Yeol, noting that "his sharp gaze overlapped with the image of Park Yeol." Choi Hee-seo was cast as Kaneko Fumiko, Park Yeol's comrade and lover. Although she had previously appeared in Director Lee Joon-ik's film Dongju: The Portrait of a Poet, this marked her first time in a leading role. She was selected for the lead due to her exceptional Japanese language proficiency and outstanding acting ability; Director Lee explained that "there was no alternative to Choi Hee-seo for the role of Kaneko Fumiko."

Kim In-woo, a third-generation Korean-Japanese actor, was cast as Mizuno Rentaro, the Home Minister who orchestrates the fabrication of the Korean riot and the Park Yeol incident; several other Japanese actors were also cast. Notably, many members of the Tokyo-based theater troupe "Shinjuku Ryozanpaku" appeared in the film, with the troupe's representative, Kim Su-jin, taking on the role of the judge who sentences Park Yeol and Fumiko to death.

== Reception ==
The film topped the box office during its opening weekend, earning US$5.9 million with 817,971 admissions. By the end of two weeks since the film was released, it has earned US$12.36 million in total. Upon its release, it overtook Real to claim the number one spot at the box office. The film earned a total of US$16.1 million after one-month run. In total, the film accrued 2.36 million admissions, equivalent to US$16.53 million.

The film was released in Los Angeles and Buena Park, California, also in Dallas, Texas in the United States.

Shim Sun-ah of Yonhap News Agency gave the film a mixed review, criticizing the character development and pacing, describing the film as "a stark contrast to director Lee's hit film "Dongju; The Portrait of A Poet." Shim concluded the review by writing: "At least the film isn't cliche or overly dramatic. And that's the strong point of the fact-based film. However, without any spectacular action sequences, stunning visuals or cinematography - elements present in other films set in the colonial period such as "Assassination" (2015) and "The Age of Shadows" (2016) - "Anarchist from Colony" just feels like healthy but tasteless food, overall."

== Awards and nominations ==
Award	Category	Recipient	Result	Ref.
26th Buil Film Awards	Best Film	Anarchist From Colony	Nominated	
26th Buil Film Awards	Best Director	Lee Joon-ik	Nominated	
26th Buil Film Awards	Best Actor	Lee Je-hoon	Nominated	
26th Buil Film Awards	Best New Actor	Kim Jun-han	Nominated	
26th Buil Film Awards	Best New Actress	Choi Hee-seo	Won	
26th Buil Film Awards	Best Screenplay	Hwang Seong-gu	Won	
54th Grand Bell Awards	Best Film	Anarchist from Colony	Nominated	
54th Grand Bell Awards	Best Director	Lee Joon-ik	Won	
54th Grand Bell Awards	Best Actor	Lee Je-hoon	Nominated	
54th Grand Bell Awards	Best Actress	Choi Hee-seo	Won	
54th Grand Bell Awards	Best Supporting Actor	Kim In-woo	Nominated	
54th Grand Bell Awards	Best New Actor	Kim Jun-han	Nominated	
54th Grand Bell Awards	Best New Actress	Choi Hee-seo	Won	
54th Grand Bell Awards	Best Planning	Anarchist from Colony	Nominated	
54th Grand Bell Awards	Best Art Direction	Lee Jae-seong	Won	
54th Grand Bell Awards	Best Screenplay	Hwang Seong-gu	Nominated	
54th Grand Bell Awards	Best Music	Bang Jun-seok	Nominated	
54th Grand Bell Awards	Best Costume Design	Shim Hyun-sup	Won	
37th Korean Association of Film Critics Awards	Best New Actress	Choi Hee-seo	Won	
37th Korean Association of Film Critics Awards	Best Screenplay	Hwang Seong-gu	Won	
37th Korean Association of Film Critics Awards	Top 10 Films of the Year	Anarchist from Colony	Won	
1st The Seoul Awards	Best Film	Anarchist from Colony	Won	
1st The Seoul Awards	Best New Actor	Kim Jun-han	Nominated	
1st The Seoul Awards	Best New Actress	Choi Hee-seo	Won	
18th Busan Film Critics Awards	Best New Actress	Choi Hee-seo	Won	
38th Blue Dragon Film Awards	Best Film	Anarchist from Colony	Nominated	
38th Blue Dragon Film Awards	Best Director	Lee Joon-ik	Nominated	
38th Blue Dragon Film Awards	Best New Actor	Kim Jun-han	Nominated	
38th Blue Dragon Film Awards	Best New Actress	Choi Hee-seo	Won	
38th Blue Dragon Film Awards	Best Screenplay	Hwang Seong-gu	Nominated	
38th Blue Dragon Film Awards	Technical Award	Shim Hyun-seop (Costumes)	Nominated	
17th Director's Cut Awards	Special Mentions	Anarchist from Colony	Won	
17th Director's Cut Awards	Best New Actress	Choi Hee-seo	Won	
12th Asian Film Awards	Best Supporting Actress	Choi Hee-seo	Nominated	
12th Asian Film Awards	Best Screenplay	Hwang Seong-gu	Nominated	
12th Asian Film Awards	Best Costume Design	Shim Hyun-sup	Nominated	
9th KOFRA Film Awards	Best New Actress	Choi Hee-seo	Won	
54th Baeksang Arts Awards	Best Film	Anarchist from Colony	Nominated	
54th Baeksang Arts Awards	Best Actress	Choi Hee-seo	Nominated	
54th Baeksang Arts Awards	Best New Actor	Kim Jun-han	Nominated	
54th Baeksang Arts Awards	Best New Actress	Choi Hee-seo	Won	
54th Baeksang Arts Awards	Best Screenplay	Hwang Seong-gu	Nominated	
23rd Chunsa Film Art Awards	Best Director	Lee Joon-ik	Nominated	
23rd Chunsa Film Art Awards	Best Screenplay	Hwang Seong-gu	Nominated	
23rd Chunsa Film Art Awards	Best New Actor	Kim Jun-han	Nominated	
23rd Chunsa Film Art Awards	Best New Actress	Choi Hee-seo	Won	
1st Resistance Film Festival in Korea	Best Director	Lee Joon-ik	Won	
1st Resistance Film Festival in Korea	Best Actor	Lee Je-hoon	Won	
1st Resistance Film Festival in Korea	Best Actress	Choi Hee-seo	Won	
38th Golden Cinema Film Festival	Best Actress	Choi Hee-seo	Won	
Cine 21 Awards	Best New Actress	Choi Hee-seo	Won	
