= Daisuke Nanba =

Japanese assassin

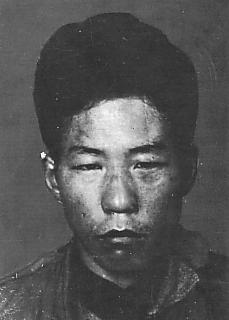
- Nanba displaying facial injuries sustained in police custody after attempting to kill Hirohito
- Born: November 7, 1899; Yamaguchi Prefecture, Empire of Japan
- Died: November 15, 1924 (aged 25); Ichigaya, Tokyo, Empire of Japan
- Known for: Toranomon incident
- Political party: Japanese Communist Party
- Status: Executed by hanging
- Motive: Anti-monarchism; Revenge for the Kantō Massacre
- Conviction: High treason
- Penalty: Death

Daisuke Nanba (難波 大助, Nanba Daisuke, November 7, 1899 – November 15, 1924) was a Japanese student and member of the Japanese Communist Party who tried to assassinate the Crown Prince Regent Hirohito in the Toranomon incident on December 27, 1923.

== Family and early life ==
Daisuke Nanba was born to a distinguished family. His grandfather was decorated by the Emperor Meiji. His father was a Member of the Imperial Diet until the act of his son forced him to resign. Before he was 21 years old, Nanba showed no signs of having any sympathy for left-wing radicals. To the contrary, he was considering becoming an officer in the Imperial Japanese Army.

== Political thought ==
After 1919, a series of events radicalized Nanba. At school in Tokyo, he attended political lectures and demonstrated in support of the suffrage movement in 1920. As a result of his father's position, he had the chance to hear Prime Minister Hara Takashi's opposition to extending the franchise. Angry against the politicians, he became more critical of his father's role and felt that some direct action was necessary. He began reading the works of Marx and Lenin as well as leftist magazines. In April 1921, he was affected greatly by Professor Kawakami Hajime's article on the Russian Revolution. He was convinced that the revolution succeeded because dedicated militants made sacrifices. The following month's newspaper account about the High Treason Incident increased his indignation at the government. In late 1923, outraged by the massacre of Japanese leftists and Koreans in the aftermath of the Great Kanto earthquake, he made up his mind to carry out the assassination.

== Toranomon incident ==
The assassination attempt, known as the Toranomon incident, took place on December 27, 1923, at the Toranomon intersection between Akasaka Palace and the Diet of Japan in downtown Tokyo, Japan. Crown Prince and Regent Hirohito was on his way to the opening of the 48th Session of the Imperial Diet when Nanba fired a small pistol at his carriage. The bullet shattered a window on the carriage, injuring a chamberlain, but Hirohito was unharmed.

== Prosecution, execution and aftermath ==
Although Nanba claimed he was rational (a view agreed upon in the court records), he was proclaimed insane to the public. On November 13, 1924, he was found guilty of high treason at an extraordinary session of the Supreme Court of Japan. When Chief Justice Yokota of the Supreme Court condemned Nanba to death, Nanba defiantly yelled back: "Long live the Communist Party of Japan!" He was executed by hanging two days later at Ichigaya Prison.

His father and his married sister exiled themselves to Java in the Dutch East Indies to escape the disgrace which Nanba, by his act, had brought upon the family. The family reportedly changed its name to "Kurokawa".

== See also ==
- Japanese resistance during the Shōwa period
- Assassination attempts on Hirohito
