= Hwang Seong-gu =

South Korean screenwriter (born 1973)

- Born: October 23, 1973 (age 53); South Korea
- Other names: Hwang Sung-goo; Hwang Seong-goo
- Occupation: Screenwriter
- Years active: 1999−present

Korean name
- Hangul: 황성구
- RR: Hwang Seonggu
- MR: Hwang Sŏnggu

Hwang Seong-gu (Korean: 황성구; born October 23, 1973) is a South Korean screenwriter, best known for his work on Anarchist from Colony (2017).

== Filmography ==
- If (1999)
- Lies (2004)
- Sad Movie (2005)
- My Girl and I (2005)
- Delivering Love (2008)
- Terroir (2008; TV series)
- Le Grand Chef 2: Kimchi Battle (2010) - adaptation
- S.I.U. (2011)
- I Am the King (2012)
- The Scent (2012)
- Tabloid Truth (2014)
- Anarchist from Colony (2017)
- Little Forest (2018)
- The King's Warden (2026)
- The Berlin File 2 (TBA)

== Awards and nominations ==
Year	Award	Category	Nominated work	Result	Ref.
2017	26th Buil Film Awards	Best Screenplay	Anarchist from Colony	Won	
2017	38th Blue Dragon Film Awards	Best Screenplay	Anarchist from Colony	Nominated	
2017	37th Korean Association of Film Critics Awards	Best Screenplay	Anarchist from Colony	Won	
2017	54th Grand Bell Awards	Best Screenplay	Anarchist from Colony	Nominated	
2018	12th Asian Film Awards	Best Screenplay	Anarchist from Colony	Nominated	
2026	Blue Dragon Film Awards	Best Screenplay	The King's Warden	Pending	
2026	Director's Cut Awards	Best Screenplay	The King's Warden	Nominated	
