= Miyoko Kudō =

Japanese author (born 1950)

Miyoko Kudo (工藤 美代子, Kudō Miyoko; born March 27, 1950) is a Japanese non-fiction writer and a member of the Japan Institute for National Fundamentals.

Her father, Tsuneo Ikeda, was a sports journalist and businessman who started Baseball Magazine (BBM) and his mother’s family founded Kudō Shashin-kan in Ryōgoku. Because her parents divorced, she took the family name of Kudō. Her older sister Akiko was the wife of Chiharu Igaya and her younger brother Tetsuo Ikeda is president of Baseball Magazine (BBM).

== Life and career ==
After graduating from Otsuma High School for Girls, she entered Charles University in Prague and then dropped out .

Her first marriage ended quickly and then, in 1973, she fell in love with Kinya Tsuruta who was a professor at the University of British Columbia. She came to Vancouver but Tsuruta’s divorce proceedings with his ex-wife lasted five years.

During that period, she wrote a biography of Toshiko Tamura together with her friend Susan Phillips which was published as Bankūba no ai: Tamura Toshiko to Suzuki Etsu ("Vancouver Love: Tamura Toshiko and Suzuki Etsu"). After that she started her career as a non-fiction writer.

In 1991, her book Kudō Shashin-kan no Shōwa won the Kodansha Prize for Non-fiction. After divorcing Tsuruta, she married Yasuo Katō, who had been a department head at Shueisha.

At first she mainly wrote about women who moved overseas, but after writing about topics related to sumo and Czechoslovakia she moved on to critical biographies of men of letters from her father’s home prefecture of Niigata including Nishiwaki Junzaburō, Yaichi Aizu, and Kumaichi Horiguchi and his son Daigaku Horiguchi, and then to biographies of Lafcadio Hearn and imperial family members. She also dealt with the issue of sex among the elderly in her book Keraku.

She says that she is prone to feel and experience daily "strange events" similar to those in kaidan which she recorded and published in Hibi Kore Kaidan.

She is a conservative who for a time served as vice-president of the Japanese Society for History Textbook Reform and has recently written a biography of Isoroku Yamamoto and engaged in debates about Tokyo Governor Shintarō Ishihara. She contributed to a volume opposing changes to Japan’s imperial succession laws and she supports the controversial film The Truth about Nanjing.

In 2009, Sankei Books published her book Kantō Daishinsai ‘Chōsenjin Gyakusatsu’ No Shinjitsu (lit. 'The Truth of the 'Massacre of Koreans' After the Great Kantō Earthquake') in which she concludes that there was no massacre of Koreans during the Great Kantō earthquake but rather there was a legitimate security operation undertaken to prevent groups taking advantage of the chaos to activate a plot to assassinate Prince Regent Hirohito.
