= Assassination attempts on Hirohito =

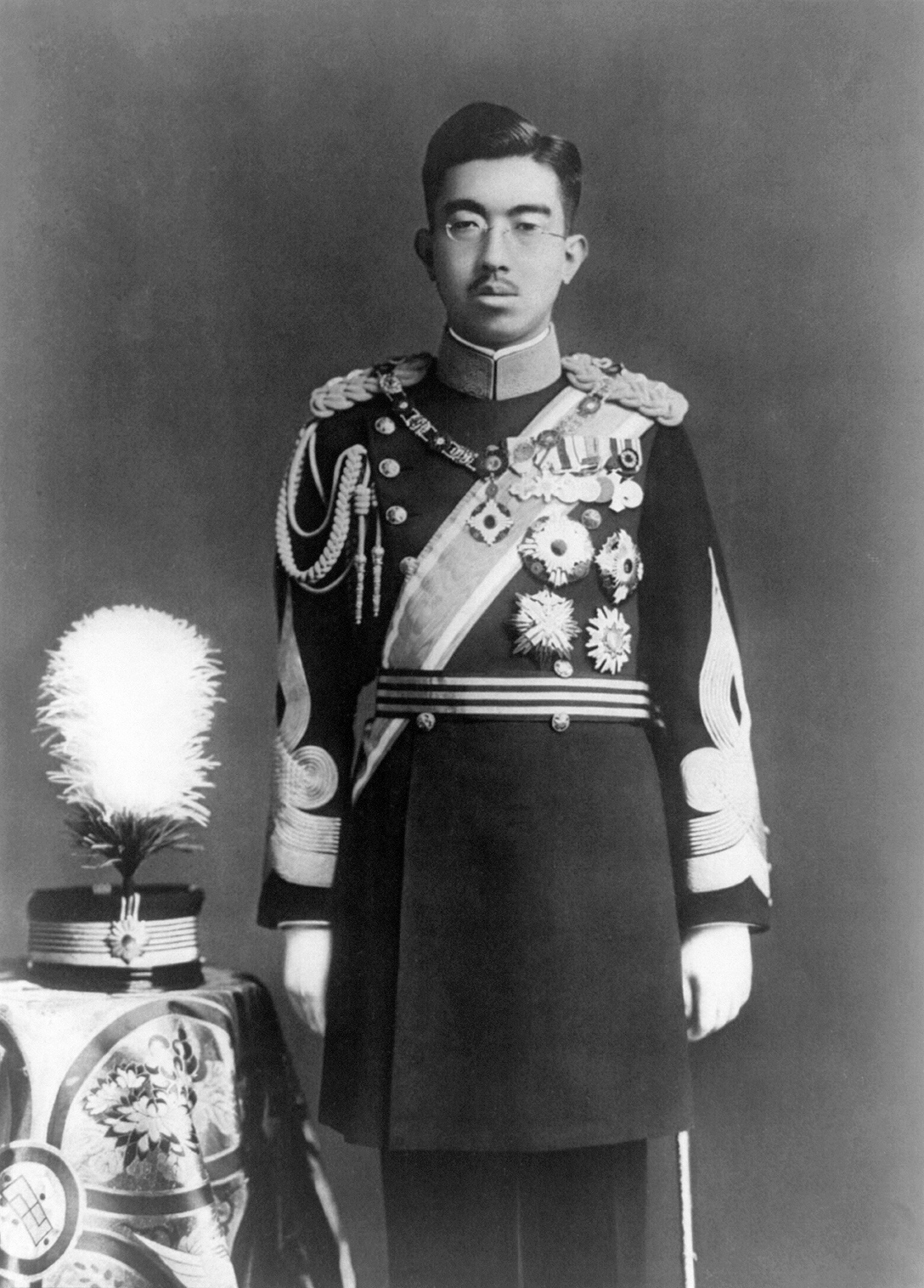
Hirohito circa 1935.

During the 1920s and '30s, there were three known assassination attempts on Hirohito, the Emperor of Japan. The assailants were all either Korean or Japanese. Assassination attempts on Hirohito took place throughout his reign as prince regent, and Emperor of Japan. All of their attempts failed. All four would-be assassins were sentenced to death, though one was granted amnesty and eventually released, and one committed suicide in prison.

In 1923, Daisuke Namba attempted to assassinate Hirohito. Fumiko Kaneko and Pak Yeol both plotted to assassinate the emperor in 1925. Lee Bong-chang attempted to assassinate the Emperor in 1932, in what became known as the Sakuradamon incident.

== See also ==
- Kyūjō incident
- Political dissidence in the Empire of Japan
- Anti-monarchism in Japan
- Assassination attempts on Adolf Hitler
- Assassination attempts on Benito Mussolini
