= Herstory (film) =

- Theatrical release poster
- Hangul: 허스토리
- RR: Heoseutori
- MR: Hŏsŭt'ori
- Directed by: Min Kyu-dong
- Written by: Jung Gyeo-woon; Min Kyu-dong; Seo Hye-rim
- Produced by: Min Jin-soo; Park Ja-myung
- Starring: Kim Hee-ae; Kim Hae-sook; Ye Soo-jung; Moon Sook; Lee Yong-nyeo; Kim Sun-young; Kim Jun-han; Lee Yoo-young
- Cinematography: Park Jung-hoon
- Edited by: Jeong Ji-eun
- Music by: Kim Jun-seong
- Production company: Soo Film
- Distributed by: Next Entertainment World
- Release date: June 27, 2018
- Running time: 121 minutes
- Country: South Korea
- Languages: Korean; Japanese
- Box office: US$2.2 million

Herstory (Korean: 허스토리; RR: Heoseutori) is a 2018 South Korean drama film directed by Min Kyu-dong. It stars Kim Hee-ae and Kim Hae-sook, alongside Ye Soo-jung, Moon Sook, Lee Yong-nyeo, Kim Sun-young, Kim Jun-han, and Lee Yoo-young. Based on the real-life story of the trials that took place in Shimonoseki in the 1990s, the film follows a group of Busan-based women who engaged in a court case against the Japanese government to highlight the ordeals of Korean women who were forced into sexual slavery as comfort women by the Japanese military during World War II. It was released in theaters in South Korea on June 27, 2018.

== Premise ==
The film depicts the story of grandmothers who bravely stood against the Japanese judiciary, traveling between Shimonoseki and Busan over six years (1992–1998), facing 23 trials with a team of 10 plaintiffs and 13 lawyers, along with those who fought alongside them.

== Cast ==
- Kim Hee-ae as Moon Jung-sook
- Kim Hae-sook as Bae Jung-gil
- Ye Soo-jung as Park Soon-nyeo
- Moon Sook as Seo Gwi-soon
- Lee Yong-nyeo as Lee Ok-joo
- Kim Sun-young as President Shin
- Kim Jun-han as Lee Sang-il
- Lee Yoo-young as Ryu Seon-yeong
- Lee Yong-lee as Yoo So-deuk
- Jung In-gi as Choi
- Choi Byung-mo as Soon-mo
- Lee Seol as Hye-soo
- Lee Ji-ha as Director
- Kim In-woo as Presiding judge
- Yokouchi Hiroki as Japanese prosecutor
- Park Myung-shin as Jung Dae-hyeob
- Lee Ji-ha as President Lee
- Tasuku Yamanouchi as Consulate officer Abe
- Kim Lee-woo as Lawyer Hashimoto Shinobu
- Ri Min as Taxi driver 1
- Son Kang-gook as Nanjing guide
- Oh Chang-kyung as Taxi driver 2
- Kim Hye-joon as Hye-soo's companion
- Han Ji-min as Teacher
- Song Young-chang as Busan mayor
- Jin Seon-kyu as Photographer
- Park Jung-ja as Mrs. Hong
- Ahn Se-ha as Taxi driver 3
- Jeong Ha-dam as Rental apartment newlywed bride
- Kim Yong-shin as Radio TV announcer

== Awards and nominations ==
Award ceremony	Category	Recipient(s)	Result	Ref.
27th Buil Film Awards	Best Actress	Kim Hee-ae	Won	
27th Buil Film Awards	Best Supporting Actress	Kim Sun-young	Won	
27th Buil Film Awards	Best New Actor	Kim Jun-han	Nominated	
55th Grand Bell Awards	Best Actress	Kim Hae-sook	Nominated	
55th Grand Bell Awards	Best Supporting Actress	Kim Sun-young	Nominated	
2nd The Seoul Awards	Best Actress	Kim Hee-ae	Nominated	
6th Marie Claire Asia Star Awards	Actress of the Year	Kim Hee-ae	Won	
6th Marie Claire Asia Star Awards	Actress of the Year	Kim Hae-sook	Won	
38th Korean Association of Film Critics Awards	Top 11 Films	Herstory	Won	
39th Blue Dragon Film Awards	Best Director	Min Kyu-dong	Nominated	
39th Blue Dragon Film Awards	Best Leading Actress	Kim Hee-ae	Nominated	
39th Blue Dragon Film Awards	Best Supporting Actress	Kim Sun-young	Nominated	
18th Director's Cut Awards	Special Film Awards	Herstory	Won	
55th Baeksang Arts Awards	Best Actress	Kim Hee-ae	Nominated	
2nd Korea China International Film Festival	Best Actress	Kim Hee-ae	Won	
2nd Korea China International Film Festival	Best Supporting Actor	Kim Jun-han	Won	
24th Chunsa Film Art Awards	Best Actress	Kim Hee-ae	Nominated	
24th Chunsa Film Art Awards	Best Supporting Actress	Kim Sun-young	Nominated	
24th Chunsa Film Art Awards	Best New Actor	Kim Jun-han	Nominated	
