= Toranomon incident =

1923 attempted assassination of Hirohito

Coordinates: 35.6706°N 139.7489°E

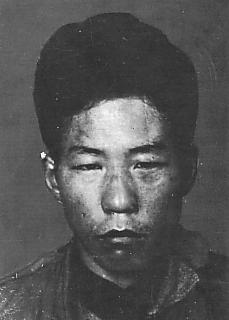
- The attempted assassin displaying facial injuries sustained under police custody.
- Location: Toranomon intersection, Tokyo, Japan
- Date: December 27, 1923
- Target: Hirohito
- Injuries: 1
- Assailant: Daisuke Namba

The Toranomon incident (虎ノ門事件, Toranomon Jiken) was an assassination attempt on Regent Hirohito of Japan on 27 December 1923 by Japanese communist Daisuke Nanba.

The incident took place at the Toranomon intersection between the Akasaka Palace and the Diet of Japan in downtown Tokyo, Japan. Crown Prince and Regent Hirohito was on his way to the opening of the 48th Session of the Imperial Diet when the young son of a member of the Diet, Daisuke Nanba, fired a small pistol at his carriage. The bullet shattered a window on the carriage, injuring a chamberlain, but Hirohito was unharmed. Nanba's attempt was motivated partly by his leftist ideology, and also by a strong desire to avenge the death of Shūsui Kōtoku, who had been executed for his alleged role in the High Treason Incident of 1910. He also wanted to avenge the killings of thousands of Koreans and Japanese leftists in the Kantō Massacre.

Although Nanba claimed that he was rational (a view agreed upon in the court records), he was proclaimed insane to the public, sentenced to death on 13 November 1924, and executed two days later.

Prime Minister Yamamoto Gonnohyōe took responsibility for the lapse in security and resigned along with his cabinet and a number of other high officials. He was replaced by the even more conservative Kiyoura Keigo and a cabinet made up entirely of members of the House of Peers not associated with any political party. The Toranomon Incident was cited later by the government as one of the justifications for the Peace Preservation Law of 1925.

== See also ==
- Amakasu Incident
- Fumiko Kaneko
- Park Yeol
