= Yokoamichō Park =

Public park and memorial in Tokyo, Japan

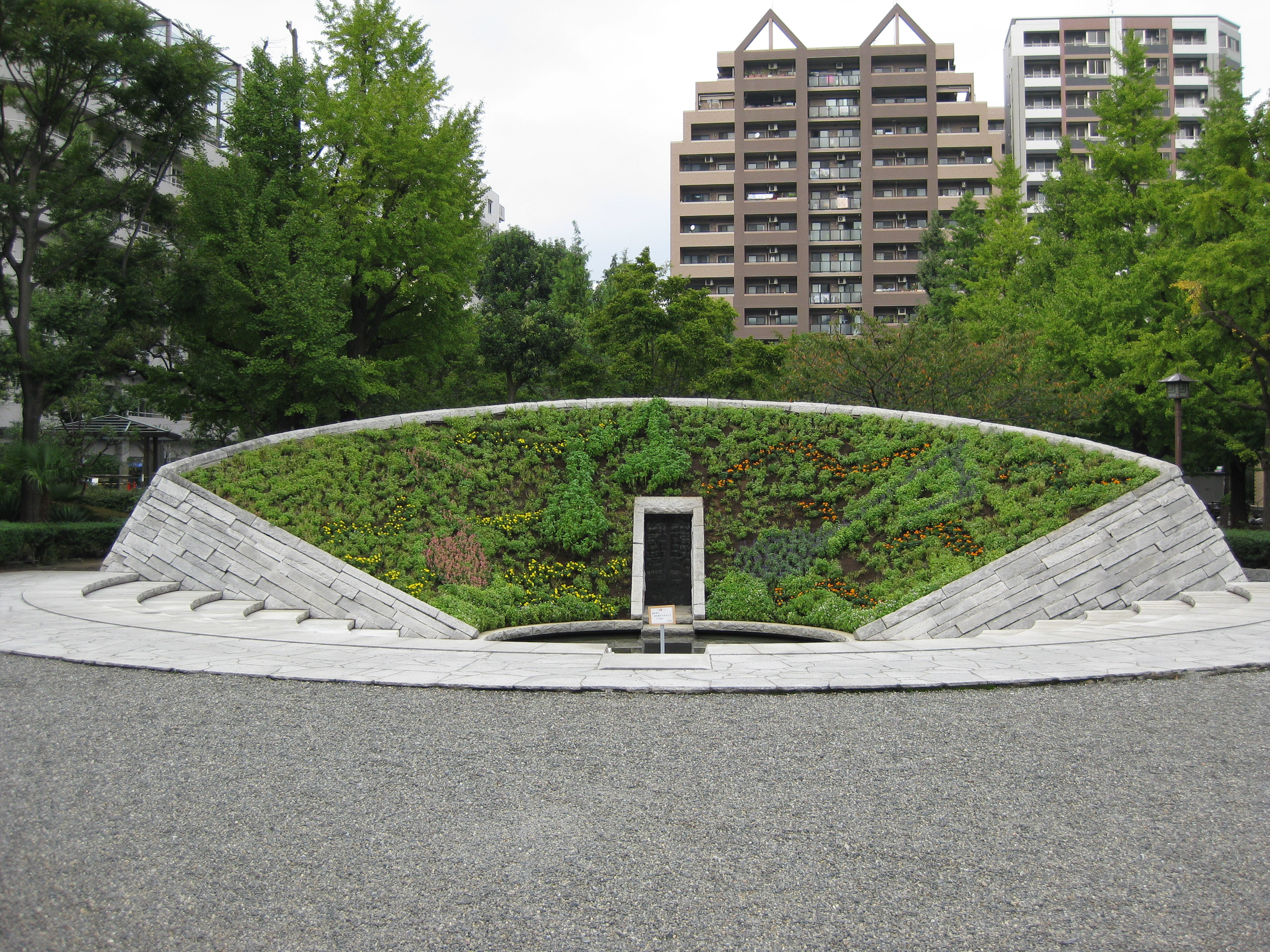
- Memorial to the Victims of the Tokyo Air Raids and the Pursuit of Peace.
- Interactive map of Yokoamichō Park
- Location: Sumida, Tokyo, Japan
- Coordinates: 35.69953°N 139.79669°E
- Area: 195,780 m^{2} (48.38 acres)
- Created: September 1930

Yokoamichō Park (横網町公園, Yokoamichō kōen) is a public park in the Yokoami district of Sumida, Tokyo, Japan.

== History ==
Following the Great Kantō earthquake on 1 September 1923, as many as 44,000 people were killed in the park when it was swept by a firestorm. Following this disaster the park became the location of the main memorial to the earthquake; the Earthquake Memorial Hall and a nearby charnel house containing the ashes of 58,000 victims of the earthquake.

Following World War II, the park also became the location of the main memorial to the victims of the Bombing of Tokyo in 1944 and 1945. The ashes of 105,400 people killed in the raids were interred in Yokoamichō Park between 1948 and 1951. A memorial to the people killed in the raids was opened in the park in March 2001.

Every year since 1974, the Japan–Korea Association (日朝協会, Niccho Kyokai) has held a memorial ceremony in the park in memory of the victims of the Kantō Massacre, which targeted Korean and Chinese people in the region. However, the memorial ceremony is regularly met with counter protests, especially by the organization Japan Women's Group Gentle Breeze (日本女性の会そよ風). For example, in 2020, the group displayed a sign reading "The massacre of Koreans is a lie". This has resulted in violence on some occasions, including in 2019. For the ceremony on 1 September 2020, 700 police officers were stationed in the park, and no violent incidents occurred. In 2022, it was reported that the then Governor of Tokyo Yuriko Koike had controversially declined to send a commemorative message for the sixth year in a row.
