= A Man of Reason =

2022 South Korean film

- Theatrical release poster
- Hangul: 보호자
- Hanja: 保護者
- Lit.: Guardian
- RR: Bohoja
- MR: Pohoja
- Directed by: Jung Woo-sung
- Screenplay by: Jung Hae-sin; Jung Woo-sung
- Produced by: Song Dae-chan
- Starring: Jung Woo-sung; Kim Nam-gil; Park Sung-woong; Kim Jun-han; Park Yoo-na
- Cinematography: Go Rak-sun
- Edited by: Kim Man-geun
- Production company: Studio Take
- Distributed by: Ace Maker Movie Works
- Release dates: September 13, 2022 (Toronto); August 15, 2023 (South Korea)
- Running time: 103 minutes
- Country: South Korea
- Language: Korean
- Box office: US$941,592

A Man of Reason (Korean: 보호자; RR: Bohoja; lit. 'Guardian') is a 2022 South Korean action thriller film directed by Jung Woo-sung, in his feature directorial debut. It stars Jung, Kim Nam-gil, Park Sung-woong, Kim Jun-han and Park Yoo-na. The film had its world premiere at the 2022 Toronto International Film Festival on September 13, 2022, and was released theatrically in South Korea on August 15, 2023.

== Plot ==
After being released from prison after 10 years, Soo-hyuk learns that he has a daughter and decides to leave the gang to live an ordinary life. However, Eung-guk, the boss who had been waiting for Soo-hyuk's release, feels betrayed by his decision. He orders Seong-joon, his right-hand man and the gang's second-in-command, to keep an eye on Soo-hyuk.

Consumed by his inferiority complex toward Soo-hyuk, Seong-joon hires a deadly duo of enforcers, Woo-jin and Jin-ah, to eliminate Soo-hyuk. Ruthless in their own brutal way, the pair approaches Soo-hyuk with deadly intentions.

== Cast ==
- Jung Woo-sung as Soo-hyuk
- Kim Nam-gil as Woo-jin
- Park Sung-woong as Eung-guk
- Kim Jun-han as Seong-joon
- Park Yoo-na as Jin-ah
- Lee Elijah as Min-seo
- Kim Joo-hun as Jun-ho

== Production ==
Principal photography began on February 10, 2020.

== Release ==
The film was invited to the Special Presentations section at 2022 Toronto International Film Festival where it had its world premiere on September 13, 2022. It was screened at Orivita section at the 55th Sitges Film Festival in October 2022. It was also invited at the 28th Busan International Film Festival in 'Korean Cinema Today - Panorama' section and will be screened on October 5, 2023.

The film was released theatrically in South Korea on August 15, 2023.

== Reception ==
As of October 9, 2023, the film has grossed US$941,592 at the local box office and accumulated 128,485 admissions.

== Awards and nominations ==
Award ceremony	Year	Category	Nominee	Result	Ref.
Hawaiʻi International Film Festival	2022	Halekulani Career Achievement Award	Jung Woo-sung	Won	
