= The Asian Angel =

- Theatrical release poster
- Directed by: Yuya Ishii
- Screenplay by: Yuya Ishii
- Produced by: Takuro Nagai; Park Jung-bum; Oh Ji-Yoon
- Starring: Sosuke Ikematsu; Choi Hee-seo; Joe Odagiri; Kim Min-jae; Kim Ye-eun (actress, born 1989)
- Cinematography: Kim Jong-sung
- Edited by: Jo Hyun-joo; Masaya Okazaki; Yuya Ishii
- Music by: Park In-young
- Production companies: RIKI Project; Secondwind Film; D.O. Cinema
- Distributed by: Klock Worx; D.O. Cinema
- Release dates: 14 March 2021 (Osaka); 1 May 2021 (Jeonju); 2 July 2021 (Japan); 28 October 2021 (South Korea)
- Running time: 128 minutes
- Countries: South Korea; Japan
- Languages: Korean; Japanese

The Asian Angel (Japanese: アジアの天使, Hepburn: Ajia no Tenshi) is a 2021 film written and directed by Yuya Ishii and starring Sosuke Ikematsu and Choi Hee-seo. The storyline follows a Japanese man seeking a new life in South Korea. The film was shot exclusively in South Korea with Japanese and Korean actors, with the narrative crafted around the idea of overcoming cultural barriers to begin new chapters in life. Tsuyoshi, a single father and struggling novelist, ends up on the road with his brother and other drifters; as they navigate their differences and their futures, the group ultimately finds modes of deep connection despite cultural and language conflicts.

The Asian Angel premiered as the closing film of the 2021 Osaka Asian Film Festival. The film was selected to be screened at the 20th New York Asian Film Festival. Ikematsu, who plays the starring role, was also selected for one of the festival’s three Rising Star Asia Awards.

== Plot ==
Tsuyoshi, a widowed Japanese novelist, takes his young son Manabu to Seoul to work with Tsuyoshi’s older brother Toru. They discover that Toru is making a shady living by illegally exporting cosmetics. The situation worsens when Toru’s partner steals the profits and runs off. Toru suggests another avenue of profit, and the trio takes off to the countryside. They eventually meet Seol, a Korean singer whose music is not selling and whose boss is pressuring her into an unwanted relationship. After Seol is suddenly dropped by her agency, she and her sister end up on the same train as the Japanese brothers, and they eventually end up traveling together. A subtle romance begins to bud between Tsuyoshi and Seol, complicated somewhat by cultural and communication barriers and effects from the past. The story also has elements of the supernatural, with Tateto Serizawa playing the role of an angel in the film.

== Cast ==
- Sosuke Ikematsu as Tsuyoshi Aoki
- Choi Hee-seo as Choi Seol
- Joe Odagiri as Toru Aoki
- Kim Min-jae as Choi Jung-woo
- Kim Ye-eun (actress, born 1989) as Choi Bom
- Ryo Sato as Manabu Aoki
- Tateto Serizawa as the angel
- Ji Ja-hye as aunt
- Jang Hee-ryung as Tae-yeon
- Seo Dong-gab as Lee Dong-hee
- Park Jung-bum as Jung-mo

== See also ==
- List of films about angels
- Films with supernatural elements
