= Choi Hee-seo =

South Korean actress

- Choi in 2026
- Born: Choi Moon-kyung; December 24, 1986 (age 39); Seoul, South Korea
- Other name: Moon Choi
- Education: Yonsei University – BA in Media and Film, English Literature; University of California, Berkeley – Theater and Performance Studies
- Occupation: Actress
- Years active: 2009–present
- Agent: Saram Entertainment
- Spouse: Unknown (m. 2019)

Korean name
- Hangul: 최문경
- RR: Choe Mungyeong
- MR: Ch'oe Mun'gyŏng

Stage name
- Hangul: 최희서
- RR: Choe Huiseo
- MR: Ch'oe Hŭisŏ

Choi Hee-seo (Korean: 최희서; born December 24, 1986), born Choi Moon-kyung (최문경), is a South Korean actress. She is best known for portraying anarchist Fumiko Kaneko in the 2017 historical film Anarchist from Colony. For this role, she set a record of winning eleven acting accolades in a single award season, whilst also achieving an unprecedented feat of winning both Best New Actress and Best Actress at the Grand Bell Awards.

== Personal life ==
Choi married her non-celebrity boyfriend on September 28, 2019, in a private ceremony.

== Filmography ==
=== Film ===
Year	Title	Role	Notes	Ref.
2009	Lifting King Kong	Seo Yeo-sun		
2010	Seoul, Lost	—N/a	Short film, as assistant editor and writer	
2010	Tokyo, Lost	Reiko	Short film	
2011	The Moon Stalker	Boreum	Short film, also as director and writer	
2011	Heart Beats Knock Knock	Hye-kyung	Short film	
2012	Nan Jian Wan Zi	Bom	Short film, also as director	
2012	Project 577	Herself		
2012	Mark's Festival	Yoonea	Short film	
2013	The Embrace		Short film	
2013	It's Time to Love	PD Jung		
2014	Janus	Eun-young	Short film, also as camera operator	
2014	Tribute	—N/a	Short film, as director and writer	
2014	Pororo, the Snow Fairy Village Adventure	Master Grandma	Short film, voice	
2014	One-minded	Gertrude	Short film	
2014	Contact Point	Ji-young	Short film	
2015	Love Never Fails	Math Teacher		
2016	Dongju: The Portrait of a Poet	Kumi		
2016	If You Were Me	Hee-seo		
2016	How to Break up with My Cat	Jung-min		
2017	Proj. Get-up-and-go	Café manager		
2017	Anarchist from Colony	Fumiko Kaneko		
2017	Okja	Interpreter		
2018	Our Body	Ja-young		
2020	Deliver Us From Evil	Young-joo		
2021	The Asian Angel	Choi Seol	Japanese film	
2021	Unframed – Findy	—N/a	Director and screenwriter only	
2026	Bedford Park	Audrey		
TBA	Exposure	Min-ju		

=== Television series ===
Year	Title	Role	Notes	Ref.
2005	Rainbow Romance		Bit part	
2007	H.I.T		Bit part	
2011	Just Like Today	Christina		
2011	Next Stop for Charlie	Moon	Season 2	
2013	The Scandal	Secretary Moon		
2014	One Fine Day In October	Ro-sa		
2014	Run, Jang-mi			
2016	Entourage			
2018	Mistress	Han Jung-won		
2018	Big Forest	Im Cheong-a		
2020	Stranger	Lee Yoo-an	Season 2	
2021	Now, We Are Breaking Up	Hwang Chi-sook		
2022	Yonder	Seri	Voice cameo	
2023–2024	Tell Me That You Love Me	Actress	Cameo (episode 3)	
2024	Dongjae, the Good or the Bastard	Lee Yoo-an		

== Theater ==
Theater play performance
Year	Title		Role	Theater	Date	Ref.
Year	English	Korean	Role	Theater	Date	Ref.
2013	Desdemona Is Not Coming	데스데모나는 오지 않아		Sanullim Small Theater	August 1, 2013 to August 4, 2013	
2014	The Chair Is Not at Fault	의자는 잘못없다	Mun Seon-mi	Aruto Small Theater	September 3, 2014 to September 21, 2014	
2023	The Army on the Trees	나무 위의 군대	Woman	LG Arts Center Seoul, U+ Stage	June 20, 2023 to August 12, 2023	
2024	The Cherry Orchard	벚꽃동산	Kang Hyun-sook	LG Arts Center Seoul, LG SIGNATURE Hall	June 4, 2024 to July 7, 2024	
2024	The Lives of Others	타인의 삶	Christa-Maria Sieland	LG Arts Center Seoul, U+ Stage	November 27, 2024 to January 19, 2025	
2025–26	The Cherry Orchard	벚꽃동산	Kang Hyun-sook	Busan Citizens Hall Grand Theater	March 13, 2025 to March 15, 2025	
2025–26	The Cherry Orchard	벚꽃동산	Kang Hyun-sook	Hong Kong Cultural Centre	September 19–21, 2025	
2025–26	The Cherry Orchard	벚꽃동산	Kang Hyun-sook	Esplanade – Theatres on the Bay	November 7–9, 2025	
2025–26	The Cherry Orchard	벚꽃동산	Kang Hyun-sook	Adelaide Festival Centre	February 27 to March 1, 2026	
2025–26	The Cherry Orchard	벚꽃동산	Kang Hyun-sook	Park Avenue Armory	September 16–26, 2026	

== Accolades ==
=== Awards and nominations ===
Name of the award ceremony, year presented, category, nominee of the award, and the result of the nomination
Award ceremony	Year	Category	Nominee / Work	Result	Ref.
Asian Film Awards	2018	Best Supporting Actress	Anarchist from Colony	Nominated	
Baeksang Arts Awards	2018	Best Actress – Film	Anarchist from Colony	Nominated	
Baeksang Arts Awards	2018	Best New Actress – Film	Anarchist from Colony	Won	
Blue Dragon Film Awards	2018	Best New Actress	Anarchist from Colony	Won	
Buil Film Awards	2018	Best New Actress	Anarchist from Colony	Won	
Busan Film Critics Awards	2018	Best New Actress	Anarchist from Colony	Won	
Busan International Film Festival	2018	Actress of the Year	Our Body	Won	
Chunsa Film Art Awards	2018	Best New Actress	Anarchist from Colony	Won	
Cine 21 Awards	2017	Best New Actress	Anarchist from Colony	Won	
Director's Cut Awards	2017	Best New Actress	Anarchist from Colony	Won	
Golden Cinema Film Festival	2018	Best Actress	Anarchist from Colony	Won	
Grand Bell Awards	2018	Best Actress	Anarchist from Colony	Won	
Grand Bell Awards	2018	Best New Actress	Anarchist from Colony	Won	
KOFRA Film Awards	2018	Best New Actress	Anarchist from Colony	Won	
Korean Association of Film Critics Awards	2017	Best New Actress	Anarchist from Colony	Won	
Resistance Film Festival in Korea	2018	Best Actress	Anarchist from Colony, Dongju: The Portrait of a Poet	Won	
SBS Drama Awards	2021	Excellence Award for an Actress in a Mini-Series Romance/Comedy Drama	Now, We Are Breaking Up	Nominated	
SBS Drama Awards	2021	Best Character Award, Actress	Now, We Are Breaking Up	Nominated	
The Seoul Awards	2017	Best New Actress	Anarchist from Colony	Won	
Wildflower Film Awards	2017	Best Supporting Actress	Dongju: The Portrait of a Poet	Nominated	
Wildflower Film Awards	2020	Best Actress	Our Body	Nominated	

=== Listicles ===
Name of publisher, year listed, name of listicle, and placement
Publisher	Year	Listicle	Placement	Ref.
Korean Film Council	2021	Korean Actors 200 (Note: Introduces 200 actors that best represent the present and future of Korean cinema to the people in the film industry all over the world.)	Included	

=== Honors ===
- 2026: Choi served as a member of the Competition Jury at the 31st Busan International Film Festival.
