= Our Body (2018 film) =

2018 film by Han Ka-ram

- Poster
- Hangul: 아워 바디
- RR: Awo badi
- MR: Awŏ padi
- Directed by: Han Ka-ram
- Written by: Han Ka-ram
- Produced by: Park Syu-young
- Starring: Choi Hee-seo; Ahn Ji-hye
- Cinematography: Lee Seong-eun
- Edited by: Han Ka-ram
- Music by: Lee Soo-yeon; Lee Hae-in
- Production company: Korean Academy of Film Arts
- Release dates: September 11, 2018 (TIFF); October 5, 2018 (Busan)
- Running time: 93 minutes
- Country: South Korea
- Language: Korean

Our Body (Korean: 아워 바디; RR: Awo badi) is a 2018 South Korean drama film written and directed by Han Ka-ram. It is her debut feature film.

== Plot ==
The film follows a young woman, Ja-young, who struggles to find her purpose in life. One day, Ja-young encounters a determined runner and develops a fascination her, modeling her life after the runner.

== Cast ==
- Choi Hee-seo as Ja-young
- Ahn Ji-hye as Hyun-joo
- Kim Jung-young
- Park Sayon

== Release ==
The film had its world premiere in the Discovery programme of the 2018 Toronto International Film Festival, held from 6 to 16 September 2018. It was then screened at the 23rd Busan International Film Festival in October 2018.

== Reception ==
Reviewing the film for Screen Daily, Jason Bechervaise called it an "impressive feature debut", with Choi Hee-seo delivering "a nuanced and dedicated performance". Variety's Jessica Kiang noted it as "a promising but almost willfully obscure debut" and "a convincing but underpowered exploration of female identity and alienation in status-and-youth-obsessed contemporary Seoul".

== Awards and nominations ==
Award	Category	Recipient	Result	Ref.
23rd Busan International Film Festival	Actress of the Year	Choi Hee-seo	Won	
