= Pak Yŏl =

Korean independence activist (1902–1974)

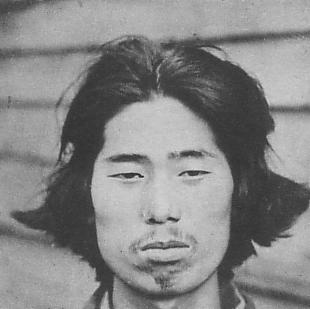
- Born: Pak Jun-sik; 3 February 1902; Mungyeong, North Gyeongsang Province, Korean Empire
- Died: 17 January 1974 (aged 71); North Korea

Korean name
- Hangul: 박열
- Hanja: 朴烈
- RR: Bak Yeol
- MR: Pak Yŏl

Birth name
- Hangul: 박준식
- Hanja: 朴準植
- RR: Bak Junsik
- MR: Pak Chunsik

Pak Yŏl (Korean: 박열; 3 February 1902 – 17 January 1974) was a Korean anarchist and independence activist who was convicted of high treason in Japan for conspiring to attack the Imperial House of Japan and assassinate Emperor Hirohito. His name is also spelled Bak Yeol, and he is also sometimes known by his birth name Pak Jun-sik. In Japanese his name was rendered Boku Retsu. Park was sentenced to death in March 1926, albeit his sentence was commuted to life in prison the following month. He was released from prison by U.S. military occupation authorities in October 1945, following the end of World War II.

== Biography ==
Pak Yŏl was born in 1902. In October 1919, Pak enrolled in a work-study program and moved to Tokyo, where he delivered newspapers to support his studies. He joined a number of radical student societies, through which he met the Japanese communist Hitoshi Yamakawa and the anarchist Ōsugi Sakae. Ōsugi was particularly influential on Pak's personal and political development, convincing him to convert to anarchism and join the labour movement. Pak diverged from his teacher in his adoption of Korean nationalism, as he desired the liberation of Korea from the rule of the Empire of Japan. Pak was also inspired by individualism and nihilism, holding the state to be the principal factor in the exploitation of labour and calling for its abolition. Pak called for the masses to take direct action against the Japanese state in all its manifestations, including the police, army and even the Emperor himself.

In November 1921, Pak Yŏl established the Black Wave Society (Korean: 흑도회; RR: Heukdo hoe; Japanese: 黒濤会, romanized: Kokutō kai), the first Korean anarchist organisation in Japan, at a meeting in the house of the Japanese anarchist Iwasa Sakutarō. Together with Cho Bong-am, Kim Yaksu and Kim Saguk, Pak became a leading figure within the organisation, editing its journal Black Wave (Japanese: 黒濤, romanized: Kokutō), which he published from July 1922. Pak wrote in the inaugural edition of Black Wave that its goal was to expose sympathetic Japanese people to the problems faced by Koreans within the Empire, with the ultimate aim of dissolving the nationalist prejudices that divided the two people and establishing a cosmopolitan society. He considered the means by which to establish such a society to be social revolution, self-cultivation through the practice of mutual aid and direct action against the state. The organisation quickly drew the attention of the Japanese authorities, which ordered its dissolution only a month after its formation.

In September 1922, Pak travelled to Keijō (today Seoul), in order to report on an anti-Korean massacre that had taken place in Niigata Prefecture. Shortly afterwards, local anarchists established a local branch of the Black Labor Society, although it was dissolved by the authorities in January 1923. During his trip, Pak attempted to obtain bombs for an action he had planned in Japan.

By December 1922, the Black Wave Society had experienced a split, with its communist faction establishing the North Star Society (북성회; Puksŏnghoe), while its anarchist faction established the Black Labor Society (흥로회; Hŭngnohoe). In February 1923, the anarchists reorganised into the Black Friends' Society (흑우회; Hŭguhoe) and began publishing a journal called Recalcitrant Koreans (후토이 센진; Hut'oi senjin). In its inaugural issue, the journal reaffirmed its goal of exposing the conditions of Koreans to sympathetic Japanese workers, while its second stated goal (possibly calling for Korean independence) was censored by the Japanese authorities. In the second issue, Pak published an article in which he criticised Japanese Pan-Asianism, due to the coercive invasion and colonisation of Korea by the Empire of Japan, and disputed the idea of an "Asian race". Following the publication of its second issue, the Japanese authorities ordered the journal to change its name, fearing it too provocative. In July 1923, the journal was renamed to The Contemporary Society. Bak wrote an article for the journal's fourth issue, in which he distinguished between the concepts of politics and power, using the rise of the Bolsheviks to a "new privileged class" as an example. In order to avoid creating such a new class, Pak advocated for direct action against capitalism, although he disregarded trade unionism and the general strike from his conception of anti-capitalist action. This article represented a continuation of the Korean anarchists' break with the communists and the beginning of Pak's turn towards nihilism.

Together with other Korean and Japanese anarchists, Pak established the Rebellious Society (Korean: 후테이샤; RR: Huteisha) as a sister organisation to the Black Friends' Society. The Rebellious Society studied and propagated anarchism without taking any visible direct action. Following the 1923 Great Kantō earthquake, Pak and his lover Kaneko Fumiko were arrested and charged with allegedly plotting to assassinate the Emperor of Japan. Although Pak and Kaneko were sentenced for the alleged plot, other members of the Rebellious Society managed to remain unmolested by the authorities, as they took no visible direct action. Former members of the Society returned to Korea, where they established the short-lived Black Flag League (흑기연맹; Hŭkkiyŏnmaeng) in 1925. One of the League's founding members visited Pak and Kaneko in their Ichigaya prison. Kaneko's death in her Utsunomiya prison, on 23 July 1926, spurred many Korean anarchists to leave Japan and return to the Korean peninsula. There Korean anarchism experienced a revival in activity, particularly in the North, where Korean anarchists sought revenge for her death.

After the defeat of Japan in 1945, Pak returned to the Korean peninsula, settling in the south. During the Korean War, he was kidnapped and taken to North Korea. Pak Yol died in 1974.

== In popular culture ==
- Portrayed by Lee Je-hoon in the 2017 film Anarchist from Colony.

== See also ==
- Amakasu Incident
- Toranomon Incident
- Assassination attempts on Hirohito

== Bibliography ==
- Hwang, Dongyoun (2016). Anarchism in Korea: Independence, Transnationalism, and the Question of National Development, 1919-1984 (PDF). Albany, New York: SUNY Press. ISBN 978-1-4384-6167-0. OCLC 1039293708.
- Raddeker, Hélène Bowen (1997). Treacherous Women of Imperial Japan: Patriarchal Fictions, Patricidal Fantasies. London: Routledge. ISBN 9780415171120.
