= Kaneko Fumiko =

Japanese anarchist (1903–1926)

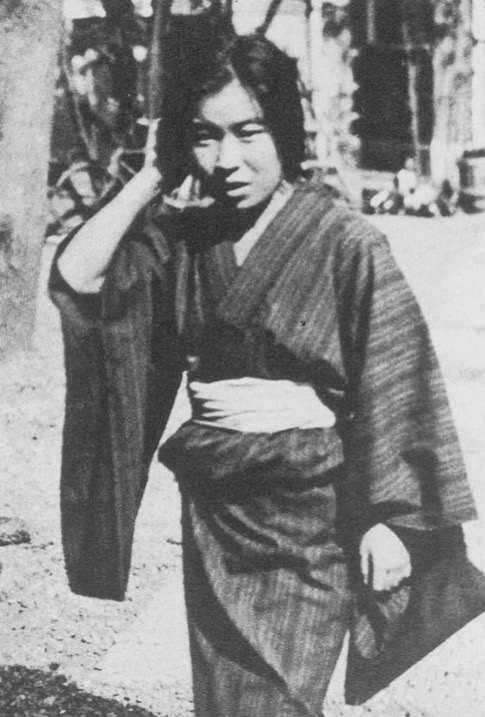
- Born: January 25, 1903; Yokohama, Kanagawa, Empire of Japan
- Died: July 23, 1926 (aged 23); Utsunomiya, Tochigi, Empire of Japan
- Burial place: Mungyeong, North Gyeongsang, Korea
- Other names: Park Munja; Park Fumiko

Japanese name
- Kanji: 金子 文子
Transcriptions
- Romanization: Kaneko Fumiko

Korean name
- Hangul: 가네코 후미코
Transcriptions
- Revised Romanization: Ganeko Humiko
- McCune–Reischauer: Kanek'o Humik'o

Kaneko Fumiko (金子 文子, Kaneko Fumiko; January 25, 1903 – July 23, 1926) or rarely Pak Fumiko and Pak Munja (Korean: 박문자; Hanja: 朴文子), was a Japanese anarchist and nihilist. She was convicted of plotting to assassinate members of the Japanese Imperial family.

== Early life ==
Kaneko Fumiko was born in the Kotobuki district of Yokohama, Japan, during the Meiji era. Her parents were Fumikazu Saeki, from a samurai family, and Kikuno Kaneko, the daughter of a peasant. As the couple was not officially married, Kaneko could not be registered as a Saeki.

In her early years, Kaneko described her life as relatively happy. Her father worked as a detective, providing for the family despite their modest means. However, Fumikazu eventually left his job, and the family began moving frequently. He developed habits of gambling, drinking, and abusing Kikuno. He also became romantically involved with other women, including Kikuno's sister Takano, whom he later married after leaving Kikuno.

Kaneko faced challenges due to her unregistered status, which rendered her "invisible to educational authorities." This meant she was not officially permitted to attend school. While some schools allowed her to attend classes informally, she was excluded from official school records, did not receive report cards, and was ineligible for graduation certificates. Despite these obstacles and interruptions in her education, Kaneko excelled academically. After Fumikazu left, Kikuno entered relationships with several men, but these did not improve their living conditions. The family remained impoverished, and Kikuno reportedly considered selling Kaneko to a brothel, abandoning the idea only when she learned Kaneko would be sent to another region of Japan. During this period, Kaneko experienced periods of separation from her mother, including a brief stay with her maternal grandparents while her mother remarried.

In 1912, Kaneko's paternal grandmother, Mutsu Saeki-Iwashita, visited and arranged for Kaneko to move to Korea, where she was adopted by her childless aunt. Before Kaneko's departure, she was formally registered as her mother's sister—a common practice at the time for children born out of wedlock.

== Life in Korea ==
Shortly after her arrival in Korea, Kaneko discovered that she would not be adopted or receive the higher standard of living she had anticipated. For the first year, her relatives maintained the pretense of including her in the family by allowing her to use the surname Iwashita. However, this practice ended, and she was referred to by her original surname, Kaneko. Her grandmother introduced her to visitors as a child taken in out of pity from unrelated people. Both her grandmother and aunt treated her as a servant. While they may have initially intended to adopt her, Kaneko believed they quickly decided she was unsuitable due to her perceived lack of refinement and upbringing.

Kaneko was able to attend school regularly for the first time during her time in Korea. However, her relatives restricted her reading materials to mandatory schoolwork. Although she was initially promised an education that would lead to college, she was only permitted to complete primary education and was not enrolled in secondary school. After finishing school, she was required to dedicate all her time to household tasks. She later identified this period as the most challenging of her time in Korea.

Kaneko was abused by her relatives. Despite their relative wealth, she was given minimal clothing and living provisions and was frequently punished with beatings or food deprivation for perceived misbehavior. On some occasions, the abuse was severe enough that she considered suicide. During her time in Korea, she also observed the mistreatment of native Koreans by her relatives and other Japanese occupiers.

== Return to Japan ==
In 1919, at the age of 16, Kaneko Fumiko was sent back to her maternal family in Japan. It is believed this was because her grandmother and aunt, unwilling to arrange a marriage for her, considered her of marriageable age and no longer their responsibility. She resumed living with her maternal grandparents and began forming a close relationship with her Uncle Motoei, who was officially registered as her brother due to her registration status.

During this period, Kaneko also reconnected with her biological father, occasionally living with him. Her father attempted to arrange a marriage between Kaneko and Motoei. However, this arrangement was disrupted when Motoei learned that Kaneko had been involved with another young man. He alleged that her involvement implied a potential loss of virginity, which, in his view, invalidated the agreement with her father.

Following this incident, Kaneko was sent to live with her father again. However, her time there was marked by dissatisfaction, as she was not permitted to pursue the education she desired. In 1920, she moved to Tokyo.

== Experiences in Tokyo ==
When Kaneko arrived in Tokyo in 1920, she initially lived with her great-uncle and soon secured a job as a newspaper girl. She requested an advance on her wages to cover enrollment fees for two co-educational schools and began attending classes in mathematics and English. Through her job, Kaneko encountered various groups, including The Salvation Army and members of anarchist, nihilist, and socialist movements who promoted their revolutionary ideas on the street. However, the job proved challenging. Her employer exploited his workers and engaged in personal misconduct, leaving Kaneko with little time for her studies. Eventually, she quit the job. Her experiences with exploitation contributed to her developing critique of social hierarchies and her belief in human equality.

Kaneko briefly maintained ties with the Salvation Army but was not drawn to their beliefs. Her connection to the group ended when her Christian friend distanced himself, fearing that his feelings for her conflicted with his religious convictions. Hoping to escape the perceived hypocrisy of the Salvation Army, she joined the socialist movement but became disillusioned when she observed similar contradictions among its members. This led her to distance herself from organized groups and adopt a more independent approach to activism.

Kaneko continued attending school intermittently during this period of personal and ideological exploration. In 1922, she met Hatsuyo Niiyama at night school. Kaneko described Hatsuyo as her "closest friend" in her memoirs and credited her with introducing her to the works of thinkers such as Max Stirner, Mikhail Artsybashev, and Friedrich Nietzsche, which influenced Kaneko's shift from socialism to anarchism and nihilism.

Kaneko's political philosophy combined individualism with a belief in the equality of all human beings. Although she identified as an "egoist" and "nihilist," her views did not reject the idea of shared human experience. Scholar Sašo Dolinšek argued that Kaneko's belief in human equality broke apart her conceptualization of individualism from that of Max Stirner, as mentioned above. Kaneko maintained that all people were equal by nature, despite the differences in status and treatment implemented by society.

Dolinšek connects this belief to Kaneko's experiences of exclusion and exploitation. Her experiences exposed the ways in which social hierarchies could determine how people were treated and what opportunities they had. Rather than accepting that these differences could be "natural," Kaneko's philosophy challenged the idea that certain people were entitled to greater authority or respect that others. Her individualism there for existed alongside a broader concern with the unequal treatment of human beings.

During this time, Kaneko also met Pak Yŏl, a Korean activist who shared many of her ideas. After abandoning the socialist movement, Kaneko began working closely with Pak to pursue her vision of activism and revolution.

== Kaneko Fumiko and Pak Yŏl ==
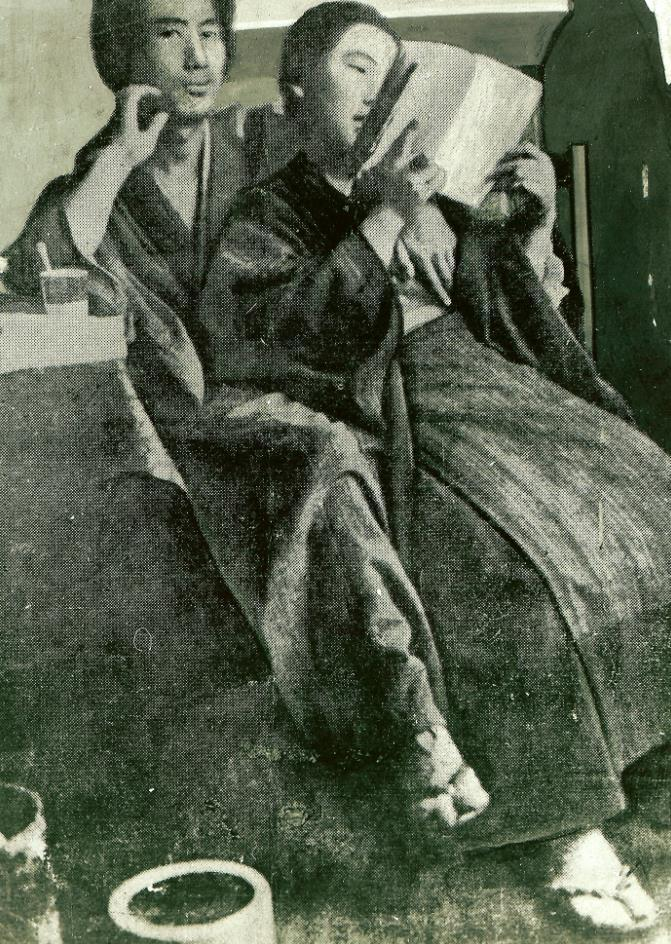
Kaneko (right) and her husband Pak Yŏl.

Kaneko and Pak published two magazines that addressed the challenges faced by Koreans under Japanese imperial rule. While not directly involved in the Korean independence movement, the publications reflected their radical beliefs. Kaneko's articles for these magazines were among her most overt acts of activism. Between 1922 and 1923, they also founded a group called Futei-sha (Society of Malcontents), which Kaneko described as advocating for direct action against the government.

Their activities attracted government attention, and they came under increased scrutiny. Following the 1923 Great Kantō Earthquake, widespread public anxiety led to fears that Koreans, many of whom were agitating for independence, might use the chaos to stage a rebellion. The Japanese government responded with mass arrests, primarily targeting Koreans, on limited evidence. Pak and Kaneko were among those arrested.

After lengthy judicial proceedings, Kaneko and Pak were convicted of high treason for allegedly attempting to obtain bombs to assassinate Emperor Taishō or Hirohito. They confessed to the charges, though Kaneko's confession appears to have exaggerated her role, possibly as an act of self-sacrifice for their cause. During her trial, Kaneko wrote an autobiographical memoir. This memoir remains the primary source of information about her life.

Kaneko and Pak, who had been romantically involved for most of their time together, were legally married a few days before their sentencing. Historian Hélène Bowen Raddeker identified as a move to "underscore the obvious irony in the fact that the Japanese state had united them legally in life before uniting them legally in death". Both were sentenced to death, but an imperial pardon commuted their sentences to life imprisonment. Kaneko rejected the commutation, tore it up, and refused to express gratitude to the emperor.

While Pak survived his imprisonment and was later released, Kaneko reportedly died by suicide in her prison cell in 1926. Her death occurred under suspicious circumstances.

== Ideological views ==
Kaneko's perspective on nihilism evolved over time, as reflected in a statement she made to the court in 1925: "Formerly I said 'I negate life'... [but] my negation of all life was completely meaningless... The stronger the affirmation of life, the stronger the creation of life—negation together with rebellion. Therefore, I affirm life." She clarified her view of life affirmation for a nihilist, stating, "Living is not synonymous with merely having movement. It is moving in accordance with one's will… one could say that with deeds, one begins to really live. Accordingly, when one moves by means of one's own will and this leads to the destruction of one's body, this is not a negation of life. It is an affirmation".

Kaneko's anarchist beliefs were supported by her rejection of nationalism, the emperor system, and as a pessimistic belief about the nature of revolutions. At her trial, she explained the reasoning behind her and Pak's plan to throw a bomb at the emperor, stating, "We thought of throwing a bomb to show he too will die like any other human being." She rejected "the concepts of loyalty to the emperor and love of nation" as "simply rhetorical notions that are being manipulated by the tiny group of privileged classes to fulfill their own greed and interests". Kaneko viewed revolution as merely replacing one form of authority with another, stating, "[Revolution] simply means replacing one authority with another." She directed her efforts toward abolishing all forms of authority. She believed that while curing societal evils was not possible, individuals could find personal meaning through actions that aligned with their existence, regardless of the outcomes, stating, "It does not matter whether our activities produce meaningful results or not… this would enable us to bring our lives immediately into harmony with our existence".

Kaneko expressed strong views on gender equality and did not formally associate with the feminist movement. She resisted societal expectations of women, as shown when her great-uncle encouraged her to leave school and marry a tradesman, she insisted that she could "never become the wife of a tradesman". Though she does not appear to have fully verbalized her reasoning to her great-uncle, she stated in her memoir that she wanted to be independent, "no longer… under the care of anybody." She criticized the unequal opportunities for women in gender-segregated education.

Kaneko also highlighted gender inequality within socialist groups. She ended a relationship with Segawa, a socialist, after he dismissed concerns about the consequences of their relationship, such as pregnancy. She stated that she "expected him to take some responsibility" and realized she "was being toyed with and taken advantage of". She pointed to such behavior as indicative of a broader failure of socialist men to uphold ideals of equality. Kaneko specifically challenged the double standard that placed responsibility for relationships on women while excusing men from accountability.

== In popular culture ==
- Kaneko and, particularly, her trial was portrayed in the 2017 film Anarchist from Colony.
- A newspaper containing Kaneko's photograph was discussed in Mr. Sunshine.
- A film titled 'Kaneko Fumiko' was released in 2026, commemorating one hundred years since Fumiko's death.

== See also ==
- Anarchism in Japan
- Amakasu Incident
- Toranomon Incident
- Japanese resistance during the Shōwa period
- Assassination attempts on Hirohito
