= Kantō Massacre =

1923 mass murder in Japan

- Part of the 1923 Great Kantō earthquake
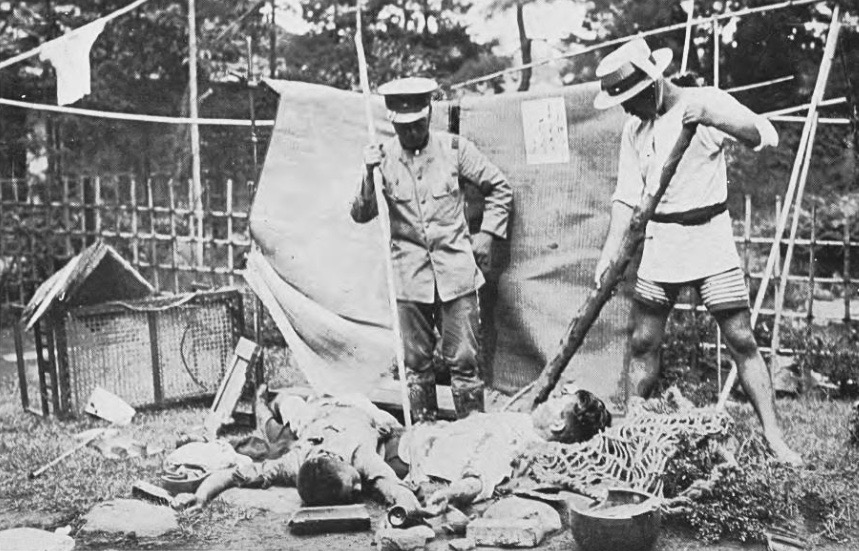
- Japanese vigilantes with murdered victims in the immediate aftermath of the 1923 Great Kantō earthquake.
- Location: Kantō region, Japan
- Date: September 1923
- Target: Koreans, Chinese people, Japanese anarchists, communists, and socialists
- Attack type: Pogrom; Summary executions; Massacres; Mass murder; Ethnic cleansing
- Weapons: Firearms, Japanese swords, bamboo spears
- Deaths: at least 6,000
- Injuries: unknown
- Perpetrators: Imperial Japanese Army, police and vigilante civilians
- Motive: Anti-Korean sentiment Anti-Chinese sentiment Anti-communism; Anti-anarchism; Japanese nationalism Racism

Kantō Massacre

Japanese name
- Kanji: 関東大虐殺
- Hiragana: かんとうだいぎゃくさつ
- Kyūjitai: 關東大虐殺
Transcriptions
- Revised Hepburn: Kantō daigyakusatsu

Korean name
- Hangul: 관동대학살
- Hanja: 關東大虐殺
Transcriptions
- Revised Romanization: Gwandong daehaksal
- McCune–Reischauer: Kwandong taehaksal

Korean name (alternate)
- Hangul: 간토대학살
- Hanja: 간토大虐殺
Transcriptions
- Revised Romanization: Ganto daehaksal
- McCune–Reischauer: Kanto taehaksal

The Kantō Massacre (關東大虐殺; Korean: 관동대학살) was a mass murder in the Kantō region of Japan committed in the aftermath of the 1923 Great Kantō Earthquake. With the explicit and implicit approval of parts of the Japanese government, the Japanese military, police, and vigilantes murdered an estimated 6,000 people: mainly ethnic Koreans, but also Chinese and misidentified Japanese, and Japanese communists, socialists, and anarchists.

The massacre began on the day of the earthquake, September 1, 1923, and continued for three weeks. A significant number of incidents occurred, including the Fukuda Village Incident.

Meanwhile, government officials met and created a plan to suppress information about and minimize the scale of the killings. Beginning on September 18, the Japanese government arrested 735 participants in the massacre, but they were reportedly given light sentences. The Japanese Governor-General of Korea paid out 200 Japanese yen in compensation to 832 families of massacre victims, although the Japanese government on the mainland only admitted to about 250 deaths.

The massacre has since been continually denied or minimized by both mainstream Japanese politicians and fringe Japanese right-wing groups. Since 2017, the Governor of Tokyo Yuriko Koike has consistently expressed skepticism that the massacre occurred.

== Timeline ==
=== September 1: Korean labor union offers food relief ===
Korean laborers in Yokohama had joined a dockworkers union led by the Japanese organizer Yamaguchi Seiken. Yamaguchi was a left-wing organizer and at the May Day rally in 1920, some of his union members had shouted anti-colonial slogans; Japanese police responded with arrests and abuse. On September 1, 1923, immediately after the earthquake, Yamaguchi organized his union to provide food and water to the neighborhood, including commandeering supplies from ruined buildings. Police regarded the labor union as a "nest of socialists" and were likely unsettled by the well-organized food relief program.

=== September 1–2: Police spread false rumors and give permission to kill ===
Kanagawa Prefectural Police chief Nishizaka Katsuto reported that on the night of September 1 he gave his district chiefs "a certain mission to deal with the emergency situation," the details of which he refused to describe. Towards the end of his life, Nishizaka told an interviewer that "someone must have said that 'Korean malcontents' were dangerous in such a time of confusion."

According to multiple reports from Japanese witnesses, beginning on the night of September 2, police officers in Yokohama, Kanagawa and Tokyo began informing residents that it was permissible to kill Koreans. Some orders were conditional, such as killing Koreans who resist arrest, but others were more direct: "kill any Koreans who enter the neighborhood" or "kill any Koreans you find." Also on the night of September 2, as police organized a vigilante band to kill Koreans in the Noge region of Yokohama, one of the organizing police officers told a newspaper reporter that Koreans had been caught with a list of neighborhoods to burn, carrying gasoline and poison for wells. In the town of Yokosuka, police officers told locals that Korean men were raping Japanese women, inciting Japanese men to form vigilante lynch mobs. In Bunkyō, the police falsely reported that Koreans had poisoned the water and food supply. Nishizaka's final report on the massacre acknowledges in a secret appendix that these rumors were all false.

=== September 2–9: Japanese lynch mobs massacre Korean and Chinese migrants ===
As a result of the police-initiated rumors, beginning on September 2, Japanese citizens organized themselves into vigilante bands and accosted strangers on the street. Those believed to be Korean or Chinese were murdered on the spot.

Koreans and Chinese wore Japanese clothing in order to hide their identities. They also tried to properly pronounce shibboleths such as "十五円五十銭" (15 yen and 50 sen), with difficult elongated vowels. Those who failed these tests were killed. The ethnic Japanese playwright Koreya Senda was targeted by a mob, and wrote of his experience in 1988:

On the second night after the earthquake, there were foolish rumors about Koreans who were allegedly on their way to raid the town to get revenge on the Japanese [...] It turned out that I was mistaken for Korean, and they wouldn’t believe me even though I denied it over and over saying, "I am Japanese…I am a student at Waseda University," with my student ID at hand. They asked me to say "a i u e o" and recite the names of the emperors in Japanese history…. Fortunately, there was a person who recognized me.

The filmmaker Akira Kurosawa, who was a child at the time, was astonished to witness the irrational behavior of the mob.

With my own eyes I saw a mob of adults with contorted faces rushing like an avalanche in confusion, yelling, "This way!" "No, that way!" They were chasing a bearded man, thinking someone with so much facial hair could not be Japanese....Simply because my father had a full beard, he was surrounded by a mob carrying clubs. My heart pounded as I looked at my brother, who was with him. My brother was smiling sarcastically....

On the morning of September 3, the Home Ministry of Mizuno Rentarō issued a message to police stations around the capital encouraging the spread of rumors and violence, stating that “there are a group of people who want to take advantage of disasters. Be careful because Koreans are planning terrorism and robbery by arson and bombs." Some Koreans sought safety in police stations in order to escape the slaughter, but in some areas vigilantes broke into police stations and pulled them out. In other cases, police officers handed groups of Koreans over to local vigilantes, who proceeded to kill them.

Both vigilantes and Imperial Japanese Army troops burned Korean bodies in order to destroy the evidence of murder. Official Japanese reports in September claimed that only five Koreans had been killed, and even years after, the number of acknowledged deaths remained in the low hundreds. After the massacre, Korean survivors painstakingly documented the extent of the massacre. Based on their testimonies, Japanese eyewitness accounts, and additional academic research, current estimates of the death toll range from 6,000 to 9,000. Between 50 and 90 percent of the Korean population of Yokohama was killed.

=== September 3–16: Police and army assassinate left-wing leaders ===
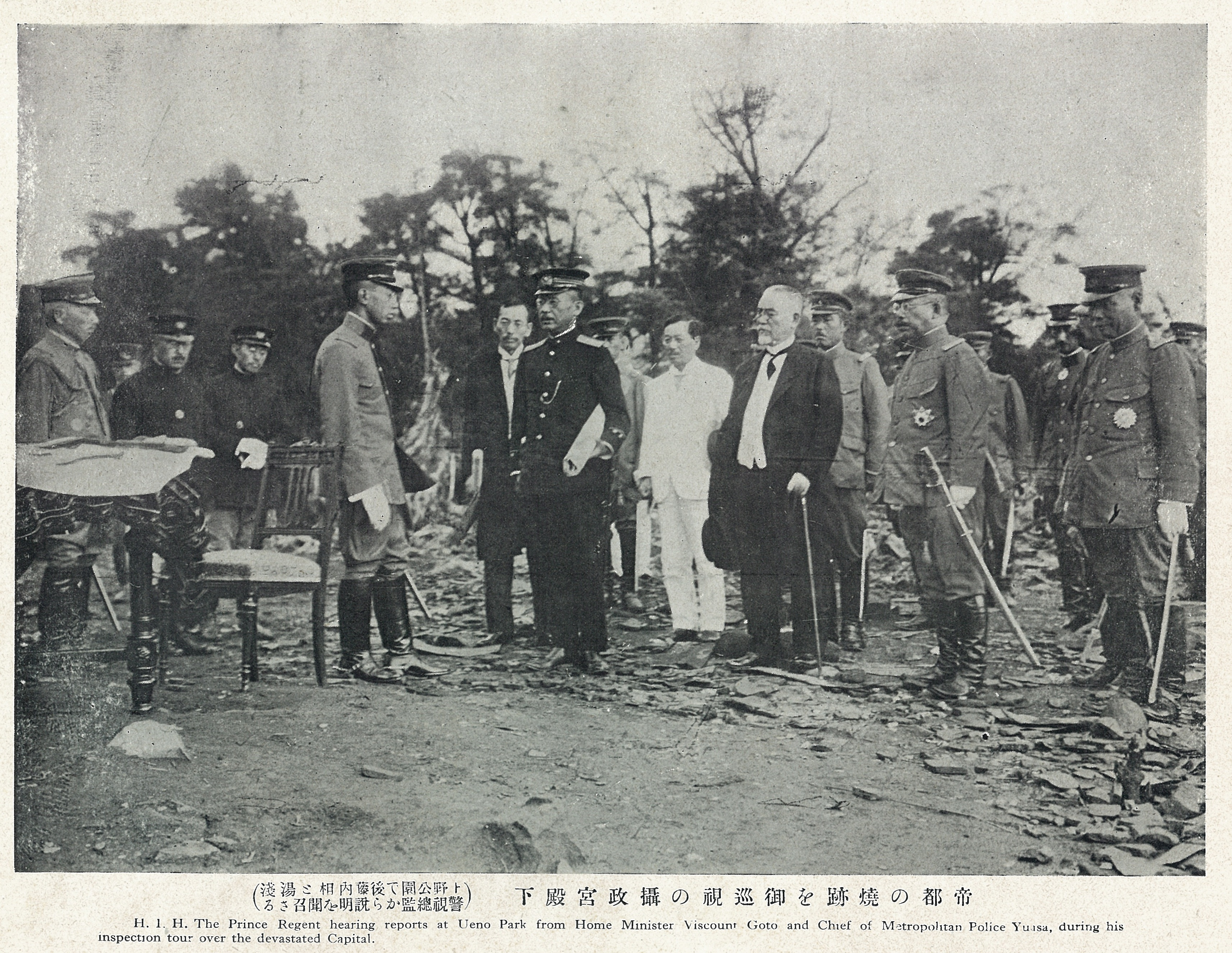
September 15: Prince Regent hearing reports at Ueno Park from Home Minister Viscount Shinpei Goto and Superintendent of political affairs of Tokyo Metropolitan Police Department (警視庁, Keishichō) Yuasa Kurahei − during his inspection tour over the devastated Capital.

Amidst the mob violence, regional police and the military police of the imperial army used the pretext of civil unrest to liquidate political dissidents. Socialists such as Hirasawa Keishichi (平澤計七), and the Chinese communal leader Wang Xitian (王希天), were abducted and killed by local police and the army, who claimed the radicals intended to use the crisis as an opportunity to overthrow the Japanese government.

In what became known as the Amakasu Incident, the anarchists and feminists Sakae Ōsugi (Japan's first Esperanto teacher) and Noe Itō, were executed by army Lieutenant Masahiko Amakasu along with Ōsugi's six-year-old nephew. The bodies of the couple and child were thrown in a well. The incident caused national outrage, albeit thousands signed petitions requesting leniency on Amakasu's behalf. The murders drew attention in the United States, since the child was a dual-national with American citizenship, having been born in Portland, Oregon. Efforts to get the American Embassy involved were unsuccessful. One embassy official made a brief statement on the case.

"In the case, even, of an unquestioned American citizen involved in trial in a foreign court, the law of that country must take its course, and we can only be interested in seeing that the trial is fair and the law impartially applied."

Amakasu and four other army soldiers were court-martialed for the murders. During the trial, Amakasu's lawyers tied the murder to soldierly duties, and the ideals of spontaneity, sincerity, and pure motives. They argued that Sakae and Noe were traitors, and Amakasu killed them out of an irresistible urge to protect the country. As for the murder of the child, they argued that this was still justifiable for the public good. Many in the courtroom sympathized with these arguments, with spectators loudly calling Amakasu a "kokushi" (hero). The judge did nothing to intervene. Even the military prosecutor, while unwilling to accept the defense's arguments as an excuse, was sympathetic. Believing that Amakasu had merely acted excessively, he said the officer's patriotism "brought tears into one's eyes". As such, he demanded only 15 years in prison with hard labour for Amakasu, and lesser punishments for the other defendants.

The judge was even more lenient. Amakasu was sentenced to ten years in prison with hard labour, and army sergeant Keijiro Mori was sentenced to three years in prison with hard labour as an accomplice. The other three men were acquitted, two on the grounds of obeying superior orders, and the other due to insufficient evidence. In August 1924, Amakasu's sentence was reduced to 7 years and six months. He was released due to an amnesty in October 1926. Amakasu studied in France and became a special agent for the Imperial Japanese Army in Manchuria. When Japan surrendered in August 1945, he killed himself with potassium cyanide.

== Aftermath ==
On September 5, after Prime Minister Uchida Kōsai acknowledged that unlawful killings had occurred, Tokyo officials met secretly to discuss a way to deny and minimize the massacre. Laying out their plans in a memorandum, they agreed to minimize the number of dead, blame the rumors of Korean violence on the labor organizer Yamaguchi Seiken, and frame innocent Koreans by accusing them of rioting. This plan was executed in the following months. A ban on reporting the death count was obeyed by all newspapers, while officials claimed only five people had died. On October 21, almost two months after the massacre began, local police arrested 23 Koreans, simultaneously lifting the ban so that the initial reporting on the full scale of the massacre was mixed with the false arrests.

Beginning on September 18, the Japanese government arrested 735 participants in the massacre. However, the government had no intent of harshly punishing them. In November, the Tokyo Nichi Nichi Shimbun reported that during the trials, the defendants and the judges were both smiling and laughing as they recounted the lynchings. The prosecution recommended light sentences.

As knowledge of the lynch mobs spread through the Korean community, thousands attempted to flee the city. The Tokyo police tasked a collaborationist group called Sōaikai with arresting escaping Koreans and detaining them in camps in Honjo, Tokyo. Tokyo police chief Maruyama Tsurukichi ordered the Sōaikai to confine Koreans to the camps to prevent them from spreading news of the massacre abroad. The Sōaikai eventually ordered 4,000 Koreans to perform unpaid labor cleaning up the city ruins for over two months.

Yamaguchi was publicly blamed by Japanese officials for starting the rumors of Korean mobs, but the charge was never formalized. After being held in prison for several months he was finally prosecuted only for redistributing food and water from ruined houses to earthquake survivors without permission of the homeowners. In July 1924 he was sentenced to two years in prison; it is unknown if he survived his imprisonment.

Korean newspapers in Seoul were blocked from receiving information about the massacre by local police. Two Koreans who personally escaped Tokyo and rushed to Seoul to report the news were arrested for "spreading false information" and the news report about them was completely censored. When word of the massacre did reach the Korean peninsula, Japan attempted to placate the Koreans by distributing films throughout the country showing Koreans being well treated. These films were reportedly poorly received. The Japanese Governor-General of Korea paid out Japanese ¥200 (1923) (equivalent to ¥107,726 or US$712 in 2024) in compensation to 832 families of massacre victims, although the Japanese government on the mainland only admitted to about 250 deaths. The Governor-General also published and distributed propaganda leaflets with "beautiful stories" (美談, bidan) of Japanese protecting Koreans from lynch mobs. Police chief Nishizaka himself distributed bidan stories of heroic police protecting Koreans, which he later admitted in an interview were carefully selected to omit unflattering aspects.

== Historical revisionism and denialism ==
=== Historical ===
After the massacre, Navy Minister Takarabe Takeshi praised the Japanese lynch mobs for their "martial spirit," describing them as a successful result of military conscription. Paper plays called kamishibai were performed for children which portrayed the slaughter with vivid, bloody illustrations. Performers would encourage children to cheer for the lynch mobs as they killed "dangerous" Koreans. In 1927, an official history of Yokohama City claimed that the rumors of Korean attackers had "some basis in fact."

=== Recent ===
In 2000, the Governor of Tokyo Shintaro Ishihara received international criticism for claiming that sangokujin (a term originally referring to foreigners, and now considered xenophobic and harsh) could be "expect[ed] to riot in the event of a disastrous earthquake". He later claimed he would stop using the word "sangokujin", but refused to apologize or withdraw the substance of his remark.

The issue has been rekindled in modern times. Miyoko Kudō's 2009 book The Great Kanto Earthquake: The Truth About the "Massacre of Koreans" (関東大震災「朝鮮人虐殺」の真実) was influential in inspiring grassroots-level attempts to whitewash the issue in official and public commemorations. Several books denying the massacre and supporting the government narrative of 1923 became bestsellers in the 2010s. In April 2017, the Cabinet Office deleted historical evidence and acknowledgement of the massacre from their website. Beginning in 2017, Tokyo Metropolitan governor Yuriko Koike broke decades of precedent by refusing to acknowledge the massacre or offer condolences to the descendants of survivors. She justified this by saying that whether a massacre occurred is a matter of historical debate. In July 2020, Koike was re-elected as mayor of Tokyo in a landslide victory. In 2022, it was reported that Koike had declined to send a commemorative message for the sixth year in a row.

Every year since 1974, the Japan–Korea Association (日朝協会, Niccho Kyokai) has held a memorial ceremony in Yokoamichō Park in memory of the victims of the massacre. However, the memorial ceremony is regularly met with counter protests, especially by the organization Japan Women's Group Gentle Breeze (日本女性の会そよ風; or "そよ風"). This group has denied the massacre and called for the memorial ceremony to be banned on a number of occasions. For example, in 2020, the group displayed a sign reading "The massacre of Koreans is a lie". This has resulted in violence on some occasions, including in 2019.

In June 2019, J. Mark Ramseyer, the Mitsubishi Professor of Japanese Legal Studies at Harvard University, published a paper in which he first reiterated contemporary Japanese newspapers' rumors about Koreans: "they poisoned water supplies, they murdered, they pillaged, they raped". Ramseyer then said "The puzzle is not whether this happened. It is how extensively it happened." Ramseyer also drew controversy that same year for describing "comfort women" (a euphemism for forced prostitutes) as engaging in a "consensual, contractual process". After receiving criticism from a number of scholars over the methodologies and views in the paper, Ramseyer's paper was withdrawn. The editor of the handbook in which it was published, Alon Harel, said of the paper's disputed portions: "It was evidently an innocent and very regrettable mistake on our part. [...] We assumed that Professor Ramseyer knows the history better than us. In the meantime, we have learnt a lot about the events and we sent a list of detailed comments on the paper that were written by professional historians and lawyers".

On August 30, 2023, just before the 100th anniversary of the massacre, Chief Cabinet Secretary Hirokazu Matsuno said at a conference that the government believed there was no adequate evidence that the massacre occurred. A reporter for the Mainichi Shimbun claimed that this contradicted a previous personal statement from Matsuno in 2011, when he acknowledged that killings had happened during the massacre. The statement was met with criticism in Japan, as well as from foreign observers.

=== Efforts to counter denialism ===
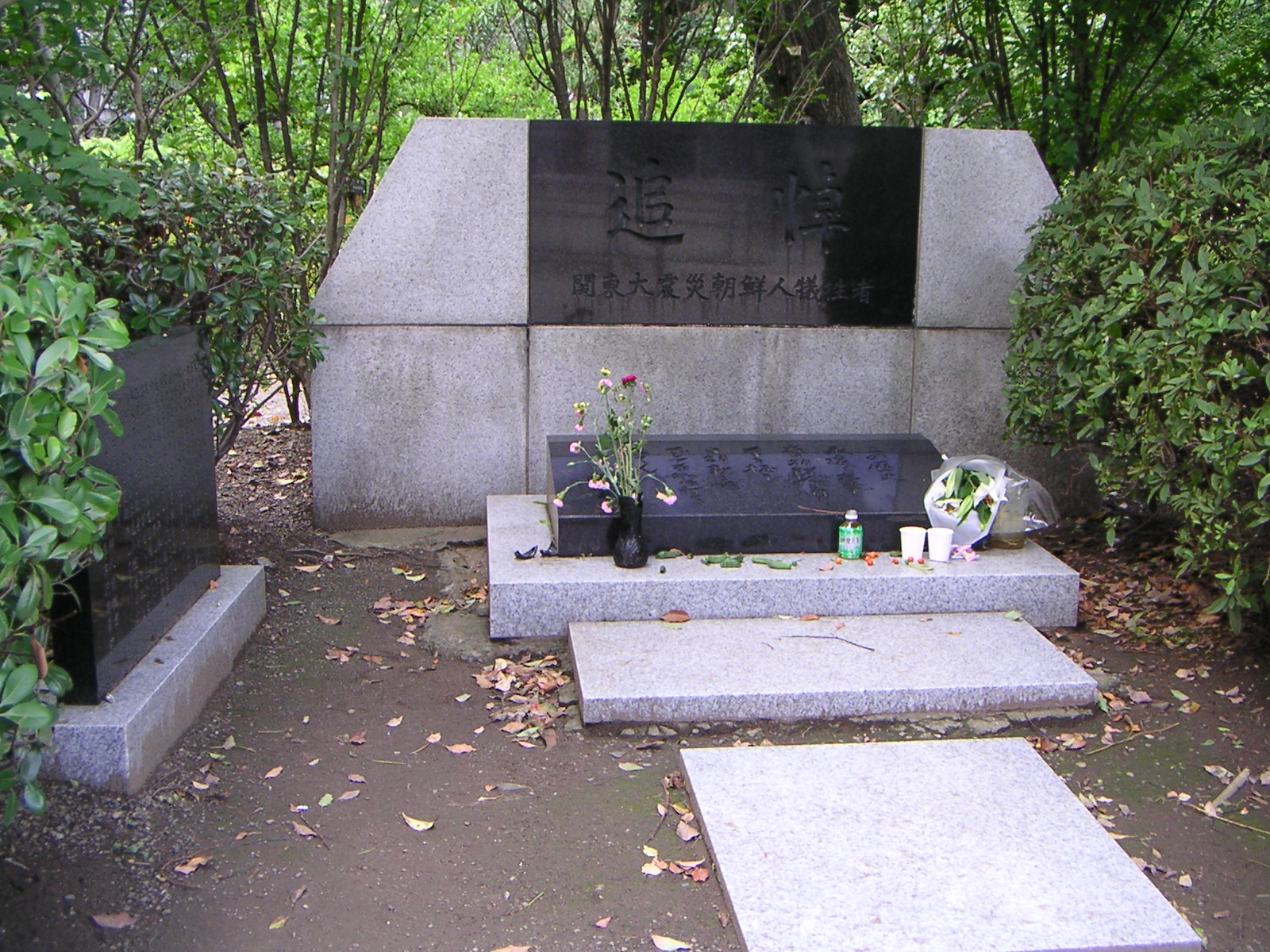
A memorial to the victims of the massacre in Yokoamichō Park, Sumida, Tokyo (2007)

In 1996, historian J. Michael Allen remarked that the massacre is "hardly known outside Korea."

The writer Katō Naoki has published a number of books on the topic. In 2014, he published September: Echoes of the 1923 Great Kanto Earthquake Genocide on the Streets of Tokyo (九月、東京の路上で 1923年関東大震災ジェノサイドの残響, Kugatsu, Tōkyō no rojō de 1923-nen Kantōdaishinsai jenosaido no zankyō). This book has also been translated into Esperanto. In 2019, he published another book entitled Trick that discusses tactics used to deny the massacre.

The Zainichi Korean Oh Choong-kong (Korean: 오충공; Hanja: 吳充功) made two documentaries about the massacre. The first is the 1983 film Hidden Scars: The Massacre of Koreans from the Arakawa River Bank to Shitamachi in Tokyo (隠された爪跡: 東京荒川土手周辺から下町の虐殺, Kakusareta tsumeato: Tokyo aragawa dote shūhen kara Shitamachi no gyakusatsu). The second is the 1986 film The Disposed-of Koreans: The Great Kanto Earthquake and Camp Narashino (払い下げられた朝鮮人: 関東大震災と習志野収容所, Haraisagerareta Chōsenjin: Kantō Daishinsai to Narashino shūyōjo).

To commemorate the 100th anniversary of the massacres and also to urge the enactment of the South Korean Congress's truth-finding bill concerning the massacre of Koreans and its century-old concealment by the Japanese government, a team of Korean filmmakers and a Korean-American historian produced "1923 Kanto Massacre," a landmark documentary film presenting an overwhelming amount of historical evidence for the massacre. Also, the National Christian Council in Japan published a declaration condemning the massacres and the history of denialism.

== Literary and artistic portrayals ==
Prewar narratives by Koreans frequently appealed to a Japanese readership to heal the wounds which were caused by ethnic divides, while in the immediate postwar period the "emperor system" was blamed for brainwashing massacre participants to act against their better instincts. After the 1970s such appeals to people's higher consciences faded away, and the massacre became part of a marker of indelible difference between the Japanese and Korean peoples and the Japanese people's willful ignorance of the massacre. Lee Hoesung's 1975 novel Exile and Freedom exemplifies this turning point with a central monologue: "Can you guarantee that it won't happen again right here and now? Even if you did, would your guarantees make Korean nightmares go away? No chance..."

As the massacre passed out of living memory in the 1990s, it became hidden history to younger generations of Zainichi Koreans. In the 2015 novel Green and Red (『緑と赤』, Midori to aka), by Zainichi novelist Ushio Fukazawa, the Zainichi protagonist learns about the massacre by reading about it in a history book, which serves to give excess weight to her fears over anti-Korean sentiment. Fukazawa emphasizes that the narrator is driven to discover this history out of anxiety rather than having any preexisting historical understanding.

There have been several plays about the massacre. The playwright and Esperantist Ujaku Akita wrote Dance of the Skeletons (骸骨の舞跳, Gaikotsu no buchō) in 1924, decrying the culture of silence by Japanese; its first printing was banned by the Japanese censors. It was translated into Esperanto as Danco de skeletoj in 1927. The playwright Koreya Senda did not write about the violence explicitly, but adopted the pen name "Koreya" after he was mistaken for a Korean by the mob. In 1986, a Japanese playwright, Fukuchi Kazuyoshi (福地一義), discovered his father's diary, read the account of the massacre which is contained in it and wrote a play which is based on his father's account. The play was briefly revived in 2017.

== See also ==
General

- Anti-Korean sentiment in Japan
- Anti-Chinese sentiment in Japan
- Ethnic violence
- Human rights in Japan
- Koreans in Japan
- Chinese in Japan
- List of massacres in Japan
- Lynching
- Racism in Japan

Related massacres

- Gando Massacre
- Jinan incident
- Nanjing Massacre

Analogous examples

- Kristallnacht
- Nadir of American race relations
- Persecution of Jews during the Black Death
- Xenophobia and racism related to the COVID-19 pandemic
