= Chunsa Film Art Awards =

South Korean film festival since 1990

- Hangul: 춘사영화제
- Hanja: 春史映畫祭
- RR: Chunsa yeonghwaje
- MR: Ch'unsa yŏnghwaje
- Awarded for: Excellence in cinematic achievements
- Country: South Korea
- Presented by: Korea Film Directors' Society
- First award: 1990
- Final award: 2025
- Website: http://www.chunsa.or.kr

The Chunsa Film Art Awards (Korean: 춘사영화제; also known as the Icheon Chunsa Film Festival) have been presented in South Korea since the founding of the prize by the Korea Film Directors' Society in 1990. The awards take their name from the pen name of the early Korean actor and filmmaker from the silent film era, Na Woon-gyu. Prizes are given for Best Film, Best Director, Best Actor, Best Actress, Best Supporting Actor, Best Supporting Actress, Best New Director, Best New Actor, Best New Actress, Best Screenplay, Best Cinematography, Best Music/Score, Best Lighting, Best Editing, Best Art Direction, and Technical Award.

== Award categories ==
Awards in following 14 categories will be given.

- Best Director Award
- Best Actor Award
- Best Actress Award
- Special Jury Award (Director Category)
- Special Jury Award (Actor Category)
- Best Supporting Actress Award
- Best Supporting Actor Award
- Best New Actress Award
- Best New Actor Award
- Best New Director Award
- Best Screenplay,
- Un Certain Regard,
- Director, Achievement Award
- Special Award

== Ceremonies ==
- 2023 – The 28th Chunsa International Film Festival was held on December 7 at Construction Center in Gangnam-gu, Seoul. The ceremony was hosted by Lee Kyu-han, Song Ji-woo and comedian Lee Byung-jin.

== Best Film ==
| # | Year | Film | Director |
|---|---|---|---|
| 1st | 1990 | Black Republic | Park Kwang-su |
| 2nd | 1991 | Death Song | Kim Ho-sun |
| 3rd | 1992 | Our Twisted Hero | Park Jong-won |
| 4th | 1993 | Sopyonje | Im Kwon-taek |
| 5th | 1994 | The Taebaek Mountains | Im Kwon-taek |
| 6th | 1995 | A Single Spark | Park Kwang-su |
| 7th | 1999 | Spring in My Hometown | Lee Kwang-mo |
| 8th | 2000 | Joint Security Area | Park Chan-wook |
| 9th | 2001 | Friend | Kwak Kyung-taek |
| 10th | 2002 | Oasis | Lee Chang-dong |
| 11th | 2003 | Memories of Murder | Bong Joon-ho |
| 12th | 2004 | When I Turned Nine | Yun In-ho |
| 13th | 2005 | Blood Rain | Kim Dae-seung |
| 14th | 2006 | Hanbando | Kang Woo-suk |
| 15th | 2007 | Once in a Summer | Joh Keun-shik |
| 16th | 2008 | Crossing | Kim Tae-kyun |
| 17th | 2009 | Take Off | Kim Yong-hwa |
| 18th | 2010 | Moss | Kang Woo-suk |
Discontinued

== Best Director ==
| # | Year | Director | Film |
|---|---|---|---|
| 1st | 1990 | Chung Ji-young | North Korean Partisan in South Korea |
| 2nd | 1991 | Im Kwon-taek | Fly High Run Far |
| 3rd | 1992 | Chung Ji-young | White Badge |
| 4th | 1993 | Im Kwon-taek | Sopyonje |
| 5th | 1994 | Uhm Jong-sun | Manmubang |
| 6th | 1995 | Park Kwang-su | A Single Spark |
| 7th | 1999 | Park Chul-soo | Kazoku Cinema |
| 8th | 2000 | Park Chan-wook | Joint Security Area |
| 9th | 2001 | Kwak Kyung-taek | Friend |
| 10th | 2002 | Lee Chang-dong | Oasis |
| 11th | 2003 | Bong Joon-ho | Memories of Murder |
| 12th | 2004 | Yun In-ho | When I Turned Nine |
| 13th | 2005 | Kim Dae-seung | Blood Rain |
| 14th | 2006 | Kang Woo-suk | Hanbando |
| 15th | 2007 | Joh Keun-shik | Once in a Summer |
| 16th | 2008 | Kim Tae-kyun | Crossing |
| 17th | 2009 | Park Chan-wook | Thirst |
| 18th | 2010 | Kang Woo-suk | Moss |
| 19th | 2014 | —N/a | —N/a |
| 20th | 2015 | Kim Seong-hun | A Hard Day |
| 21st | 2016 | Choi Dong-hoon | Assassination |
| 22nd | 2017 | Na Hong-jin | The Wailing |
| 23rd | 2018 | Hwang Dong-hyuk | The Fortress |
| 24th | 2019 | Bong Joon-ho | Parasite |
| 25th | 2020 | Won Shin-yun | The Battle: Roar to Victory |
| 26th | 2021 | Jo Sung-hee | Space Sweepers |
| 27th | 2022 | Park Chan-wook | Decision to Leave |
| 28th | 2023 | Kim Jee-woon | Cobweb |
| 29th | 2025 | Yoon Ga-eun | The World of Love |

== Best Actor ==
| # | Year | Actor | Film |
|---|---|---|---|
| 1st | 1990 | Ahn Sung-ki | North Korean Partisan in South Korea |
| 2nd | 1991 | Lee Deok-hwa | Fly High Run Far |
| 3rd | 1992 | Moon Sung-keun | Road to the Racetrack |
| 4th | 1993 | Lee Deok-hwa | I Will Survive |
| 5th | 1994 | Jang Dong-hwi | Manmubang |
| 6th | 1995 | Hong Kyung-in | A Single Spark |
| 7th | 1999 | Park Shin-yang | A Promise |
| 8th | 2000 | Sul Kyung-gu | Peppermint Candy |
| 9th | 2001 | Yu Oh-seong | Friend |
| 10th | 2002 | Sul Kyung-gu | Oasis |
| 11th | 2003 | Song Kang-ho | Memories of Murder |
| 12th | 2004 | Choi Min-sik | Oldboy |
| 13th | 2005 | Lee Byung-hun | A Bittersweet Life |
| 14th | 2006 | Kam Woo-sung | King and the Clown |
| 15th | 2007 | Cha Seung-won | My Son |
| 16th | 2008 | Kim Yoon-seok; Ha Jung-woo | The Chaser |
| 17th | 2009 | Song Kang-ho | Thirst |
| 18th | 2010 | Sul Kyung-gu | No Mercy |
| 19th | 2014 | Song Kang-ho | The Attorney |
| 20th | 2015 | Ha Jung-woo | Kundo: Age of the Rampant |
| 21st | 2016 | Yoo Ah-in | The Throne |
| 22nd | 2017 | Ha Jung-woo | The Tunnel |
| 23rd | 2018 | Jung Woo-sung | Steel Rain |
| 24th | 2019 | Ju Ji-hoon | Dark Figure of Crime |
| 25th | 2020 | Lee Byung-hun | The Man Standing Next |
| 26th | 2021 | Song Joong-ki | Space Sweepers |
| 27th | 2022 | Park Hae-il | Decision to Leave |
| 28th | 2023 | Ryu Jun-yeol | The Night Owl |
| 29th | 2025 | Lee Byung-hun | No Other Choice |

== Best Actress ==
| # | Year | Actress | Film |
|---|---|---|---|
| 1st | 1990 | Shim Hye-jin | Black Republic |
| 2nd | 1991 | Chang Mi-hee | Death Song |
| 3rd | 1992 | Kang Soo-yeon | Road to the Racetrack |
| 4th | 1993 | Oh Jung-hae | Sopyonje |
| 5th | 1994 | Shim Hye-jin | Out to the World |
| 6th | 1995 | Bang Eun-jin | 301, 302 |
| 7th | 1999 | Lee Mi-sook | An Affair |
| 8th | 2000 | Jeon Do-yeon | Happy End |
| 9th | 2001 | Bae Doona; Lee Yo-won; Ok Ji-young | Take Care of My Cat |
| 10th | 2002 | Moon So-ri | Oasis |
| 11th | 2003 | Moon So-ri | A Good Lawyer's Wife |
| 12th | 2004 | Kim Hye-soo | Hypnotized |
| 12th | 2004 | Lee Na-young | Someone Special |
| 13th | 2005 | Jeon Do-yeon | You Are My Sunshine |
| 14th | 2006 | Kim Hye-soo | Tazza: The High Rollers |
| 15th | 2007 | Kim Ah-joong | 200 Pounds Beauty |
| 16th | 2008 | Lee Mi-yeon | Love Exposure |
| 17th | 2009 | Shin Min-ah | Go Go 70s |
| 18th | 2010 | Uhm Jung-hwa | Bestseller |
| 19th | 2014 | Shim Eun-kyung | Miss Granny |
| 20th | 2015 | Bae Doona | A Girl at My Door |
| 21st | 2016 | Kim Hye-soo | Coin Locker Girl |
| 22nd | 2017 | Son Ye-jin | The Truth Beneath |
| 23rd | 2018 | Kim Ok-vin | The Villainess |
| 24th | 2019 | Cho Yeo-jeong | Parasite |
| 25th | 2020 | Lee Young-ae | Bring Me Home |
| 26th | 2021 | Jeon Do-yeon | Beasts Clawing at Straws |
| 27th | 2022 | Tang Wei | Decision to Leave |
| 28th | 2023 | Kim Hye-soo | Smugglers |
| 29th | 2025 | Lim Yoona | Pretty Crazy |

== Best Supporting Actor ==
| # | Year | Actor | Film |
|---|---|---|---|
| 1st | 1990 | —N/a | —N/a |
| 2nd | 1991 | Lee Geung-young | Silver Stallion |
| 3rd | 1992 | Lee Geung-young | White Badge |
| 3rd | 1992 | Hong Kyung-in; Go Jeong-il | Our Twisted Hero |
| 4th | 1993 | Lee Il-woong | I Will Survive |
| 5th | 1994 | Lee Geung-young | Out to the World |
| 6th | 1995 | Lee Hae-ryong | Mugoonghwa - Korean National Flower |
| 7th | 1999 | —N/a | —N/a |
| 8th | 2000 | Shin Ha-kyun | Joint Security Area |
| 9th | 2001 | —N/a | —N/a |
| 10th | 2002 | Kang Shin-il | Public Enemy |
| 11th | 2003 | Park No-shik | Memories of Murder |
| 12th | 2004 | Jung Doo-hong | Fighter in the Wind |
| 13th | 2005 | Park Yong-woo | Blood Rain |
| 14th | 2006 | Lee Beom-soo | The City of Violence |
| 14th | 2006 | Jang Hang-sun | King and the Clown |
| 15th | 2007 | Oh Dal-su | Once in a Summer |
| 15th | 2007 | Jo Han-sun | Cruel Winter Blues |
| 16th | 2008 | Kim Yeong-cheol | My Father |
| 17th | 2009 | Sung Dong-il | Take Off |
| 17th | 2009 | Park Hee-soon | The Scam |
| 18th | 2010 | Ko Chang-seok | A Barefoot Dream |
| 18th | 2010 | Yoo Jun-sang | Moss |
| 19th | 2014 | —N/a | —N/a |
| 20th | 2015 | —N/a | —N/a |
| 21st | 2016 | Cho Jin-woong | Assassination |
| 22nd | 2017 | Park Jung-min | Dongju: The Portrait of a Poet |
| 23rd | 2018 | Kim Dong-wook | Along with the Gods: The Two Worlds |
| 24th | 2019 | Steven Yeun | Burning |
| 25th | 2020 | Lee Sung-min | The Man Standing Next |
| 26th | 2021 | Park Jeong-min | Deliver Us from Evil |
| 27th | 2022 | Park Ji-hwan | The Roundup |
| 28th | 2023 | Kim Jong-soo | Smugglers |
| 29th | 2025 | Kwon Hae-hyo | The Ugly |

== Best Supporting Actress ==
| # | Year | Actress | Film |
|---|---|---|---|
| 1st | 1990 | —N/a | —N/a |
| 2nd | 1991 | Kim Bo-yeon | Silver Stallion |
| 3rd | 1992 | Kim Bo-yeon | Road to the Racetrack |
| 4th | 1993 | Moon Mi-bong | When Adam Opens His Eyes |
| 5th | 1994 | Jung Kyung-soon | The Taebaek Mountains |
| 6th | 1995 | Kim Bo-yeon | A Hot Roof |
| 7th | 1999 | —N/a | —N/a |
| 8th | 2000 | Kim Sung-nyeo | Chunhyang |
| 9th | 2001 | —N/a | —N/a |
| 10th | 2002 | Ye Ji-won | On the Occasion of Remembering the Turning Gate |
| 11th | 2003 | Song Yun-ah | Jail Breakers |
| 12th | 2004 | Go Doo-shim | My Mother, the Mermaid |
| 13th | 2005 | Oh Mi-hee | All for Love |
| 14th | 2006 | Kim Soo-mi | Barefoot Ki-bong |
| 15th | 2007 | Uhm Ji-won | Traces of Love |
| 16th | 2008 | Kim Ji-young | Forever the Moment |
| 17th | 2009 | Kim Hae-sook | Thirst |
| 17th | 2009 | Lee Hye-sook | Take Off |
| 18th | 2010 | Youn Yuh-jung | The Housemaid |
| 19th | 2014 | —N/a | —N/a |
| 20th | 2015 | —N/a | —N/a |
| 21st | 2016 | Uhm Ji-won | The Silenced |
| 22nd | 2017 | Yoo In-young | Misbehavior |
| 23rd | 2018 | Kim Sun-young | Communication & Lies |
| 24th | 2019 | Lee Jung-eun | Parasite |
| 25th | 2020 | Kim Mi-kyung | Kim Ji-young: Born 1982 |
| 26th | 2021 | Bae Jong-ok | Innocence |
| 27th | 2022 | Oh Na-ra | Perhaps Love |
| 28th | 2023 | Krystal Jung | Cobweb |
| 29th | 2025 | Lee Jung-eun | My Daughter Is a Zombie |

== Best New Director ==
| # | Year | Director | Film |
|---|---|---|---|
| 1st | 1990 | Hwang Qu-duk | Our Class Accepts Anyone Regardless of Grade |
| 2nd | 1991 | Lee Myung-se | My Love, My Bride |
| 2nd | 1991 | Won Jung-soo | Lost Love |
| 3rd | 1992 | Kim Ui-seok | Marriage Story |
| 4th | 1993 | Lee Hyun-seung | The Blue in You |
| 5th | 1994 | Kim Hong-joon | Rosy Life |
| 6th | 1995 | Lee Min-yong | A Hot Roof |
| 7th | 1999 | Lee Jeong-hyang | Art Museum by the Zoo |
| 8th | 2000 | Kim Jung-kwon | Ditto |
| 8th | 2000 | Kim Ki-young | Truth Game |
| 9th | 2001 | —N/a | —N/a |
| 10th | 2002 | Kim Hyun-seok | YMCA Baseball Team |
| 11th | 2003 | Jang Joon-hwan | Save the Green Planet! |
| 12th | 2004 | Kim Hak-soon | Rewind |
| 13th | 2005 | Jeong Yoon-cheol | Marathon |
| 14th | 2006 | Lee Hwan-kyung | Lump Sugar |
| 15th | 2007 | Lee Jeong-beom | Cruel Winter Blues |
| 16th | 2008 | Na Hong-jin | The Chaser |
| 17th | 2009 | Park Geun-yong | Lifting King Kong |
| 18th | 2010 | Kang Dae-kyu | Harmony |
| 19th | 2014 | Yang Woo-suk | The Attorney |
| 20th | 2015 | Woo Moon-gi | The King of Jokgu |
| 21st | 2016 | Hong Seok-jae | Socialphobia |
| 22nd | 2017 | Kim Jin-hwang | The Boys Who Cried Wolf |
| 23rd | 2018 | Kang Yoon-sung | The Outlaws |
| 24th | 2019 | Kim Tae-gyun | Dark Figure of Crime |
| 25th | 2020 | Kim Do-young | Kim Ji-young: Born 1982 |
| 28th | 2023 | Ahn Tae-jin | The Night Owl |
| 29th | 2025 | Jang Byung-ki | When This Summer is Over |

== Best New Actor ==
| # | Year | Actor | Film |
|---|---|---|---|
| 1st | 1990 | Moon Sung-keun | Black Republic |
| 2nd | 1991 | Choi Jin-young | Beyond the Mountain |
| 3rd | 1992 | Kim Yong-il | A Surrogate Father |
| 4th | 1993 | Kim Kyu-chul | Seopyeonje |
| 5th | 1994 | Kim Kap-soo | The Taebaek Mountains |
| 6th | 1995 | Han Suk-kyu | Doctor Bong |
| 6th | 1995 | Lee Byung-hun | Who Drives Me Mad? |
| 7th | 1999 | Lee Sung-jae | Art Museum by the Zoo |
| 8th | 2000 | Yoo Ji-tae | Ditto |
| 9th | 2001 | —N/a | —N/a |
| 10th | 2002 | Kim Sang-kyung | On the Occasion of Remembering the Turning Gate |
| 11th | 2003 | Park Hae-il | Jealousy Is My Middle Name |
| 12th | 2004 | Won Bin | Taegukgi |
| 13th | 2005 | Jin Tae-hyun | All for Love |
| 14th | 2006 | Uhm Tae-woong | Family Ties |
| 15th | 2007 | Jung Kyung-ho | Herb |
| 16th | 2008 | Daniel Henney | My Father |
| 17th | 2009 | Song Chang-eui | Once Upon a Time in Seoul |
| 17th | 2009 | Cha Seung-woo | Go Go 70s |
| 18th | 2010 | Cho Jin-woong | Bestseller |
| 18th | 2010 | Choi Jae-woong | The Sword with No Name |
| 19th | 2014 | —N/a | —N/a |
| 20th | 2015 | —N/a | —N/a |
| 21st | 2016 | Kang Ha-neul | Twenty |
| 22nd | 2017 | Koo Kyo-hwan | Beaten Black and Blue |
| 23rd | 2018 | Oh Seung-hoon | Method |
| 24th | 2019 | Gong Myung | Extreme Job |
| 25th | 2020 | Park Hae-soo | By Quantum Physics: A Nightlife Venture |
| 27th | 2022 | Kim Dong-hwi | In Our Prime |
| 27th | 2022 | Mu Jin-sung | Perhaps Love |
| 28th | 2023 | Kim Sung-cheol | The Night Owl |
| 29th | 2025 | Jung Sung-il | Uprising |

== Best New Actress ==
| # | Year | Actress | Film |
|---|---|---|---|
| 1st | 1990 | Choi Jin-sil | North Korean Partisan in South Korea |
| 2nd | 1991 | Kim Geum-yong | Beyond the Mountain |
| 2nd | 1991 | Kim Sung-ryung | Who Saw the Dragon's Claws? |
| 3rd | 1992 | Oh Yeon-soo | Women Upstairs, Men Downstairs |
| 4th | 1993 | Park Sun-young | The Man With Breasts |
| 4th | 1993 | Lee Yoon-sung | When Adam Opens His Eyes |
| 5th | 1994 | Jung Sun-kyung | To You, From Me |
| 6th | 1995 | Lee Ji-eun | My Dear Keum-hong |
| 7th | 1999 | Kim Gyu-ri | Whispering Corridors |
| 7th | 1999 | Kim Yeo-jin | Girls' Night Out |
| 8th | 2000 | Lee Ji-hyun | La Belle |
| 9th | 2001 | —N/a | —N/a |
| 10th | 2002 | Seo Won | Bad Guy |
| 11th | 2003 | Hwang Jung-min | Save the Green Planet! |
| 12th | 2004 | Moon Geun-young | My Little Bride |
| 13th | 2005 | Seo Young-hee | All for Love |
| 14th | 2006 | Lee Bo-young | A Dirty Carnival |
| 15th | 2007 | Lee Se-eun | Once in a Summer |
| 16th | 2008 | Lee Hwa-seon | Sex Is Zero 2 |
| 16th | 2008 | Jo Eun-ji | Forever the Moment |
| 17th | 2009 | Jo An | Lifting King Kong |
| 18th | 2010 | Kang Ye-won | Harmony |
| 19th | 2014 | —N/a | —N/a |
| 20th | 2015 | —N/a | —N/a |
| 21st | 2016 | Park So-dam | The Priests |
| 22nd | 2017 | Lee Sang-hee | Our Love Story |
| 23rd | 2018 | Choi Hee-seo | Anarchist from Colony |
| 24th | 2019 | Jeon Yeo-been | After My Death |
| 24th | 2019 | Jin Ki-joo | Little Forest |
| 25th | 2020 | Choi Sung-eun | Start-Up |
| 26th | 2021 | —N/a | —N/a |
| 27th | 2022 | Lee Ji-eun | Broker |
| 28th | 2023 | Go Min-si | Smugglers |
| 29th | 2025 | Seo Su-bin | The World of Love |

== Best Young Actor/Actress ==
| # | Year | Actor/Actress | Film |
|---|---|---|---|
| 4th | 1993 | Oh Tae-kyung | Hwa-Om-Kyung |
| 5th | 1994 | —N/a | —N/a |
| 6th | 1995 | —N/a | —N/a |
| 7th | 1996 | —N/a | —N/a |
| 8th | 1997 | —N/a | —N/a |
| 9th | 1998 | —N/a | —N/a |
| 10th | 1999 | —N/a | —N/a |
| 11th | 2003 | —N/a | —N/a |
| 12th | 2004 | Lee Se-young, Kim Seok, Na Ah-hyun, Kim Myung-jae | When I Turned Nine |
| 13th | 2005 | Lee Jae-eung | Bravo, My Life |
| 14th | 2006 | —N/a | —N/a |
| 15th | 2007 | —N/a | —N/a |
| 16th | 2008 | Shin Myeong-cheol | Crossing |
| 17th | 2009 | Wang Seok-hyeon | Scandal Makers |
Discontinued

== Best Screenplay ==
| # | Year | Screenwriter | Film |
|---|---|---|---|
| 1st | 1990 | Yun Dae-seong | Black Republic |
| 2nd | 1991 | [Original] Im Yu-sun | Death Song |
| 2nd | 1991 | [Adapted] Jang Kil-su | Silver Stallion |
| 3rd | 1992 | [Original] Park Heon-su | Marriage Story |
| 3rd | 1992 | [Adapted] Park Jong-won, Jang Hyun-soo | Our Twisted Hero |
| 4th | 1993 | Moon Sang-hoon | Mother's Field |
| 5th | 1994 | Jang Hyun-soo, Kang Je-gyu | The Rules of the Game |
| 6th | 1995 | Lee Kyung-sik | A Hot Roof |
| 7th | 1999 | Lee Jeong-hyang | Art Museum by the Zoo |
| 8th | 2000 | Lee Chang-dong | Peppermint Candy |
| 9th | 2001 | Yim Soon-rye | Waikiki Brothers |
| 10th | 2002 | Lee Chang-dong | Oasis |
| 11th | 2003 | Bong Joon-ho, Shim Sung-bo | Memories of Murder |
| 12th | 2004 | Lee Man-hee | When I Turned Nine |
| 13th | 2005 | Yu Seong-hyeop, Min Kyu-dong | All for Love |
| 14th | 2006 | Jang Min-seok, Park Eun-yeong | Maundy Thursday |
| 15th | 2007 | Jang Min-seok | Traces of Love |
| 16th | 2008 | Lee Yu-jin | Crossing |
| 16th | 2008 | Na Hong-jin, Lee Shin-ho, Hong Won-chan | The Chaser |
| 17th | 2009 | Lee Hae-jun | Castaway on the Moon |
| 18th | 2010 | Yoon Jae-goo | Secret |
| 19th | 2014 | Shin Dong-ik, Hong Yun-jeong, Dong Hee-seon | Miss Granny |
| 20th | 2015 | Park Su-jin | Ode to My Father |
| 21st | 2016 | Cho Chul-hyun | The Throne |
| 22nd | 2017 | Lee Kyoung-mi | The Truth Beneath |
| 23rd | 2018 | Shin Yeon-shick | Romans 8:37 |
| 24th | 2019 | Bong Joon-ho; Han Jin-won | Parasite |
| 28th | 2023 | Hyun Gyu-ri, Ahn Tae-jin | The Night Owl |
| 29th | 2025 | Lee Ran-hee | The Final Semester |

== Best Cinematography ==
| # | Year | Cinematographer | Film |
|---|---|---|---|
| 1st | 1990 | Yoo Young-gil | North Korean Partisan in South Korea |
| 2nd | 1991 | Lee Seong-chun | Death Song |
| 3rd | 1992 | Park Seung-bae | Walking All the Way to Heaven |
| 4th | 1993 | Yoo Young-gil | Hwa-Om-Kyung |
| 5th | 1994 | Jung Il-sung | The Taebaek Mountains |
| 6th | 1995 | Yoo Young-gil | A Single Spark |
| 7th | 1999 | Jeon Jo-myeong | A Promise |
| 8th | 2000 | Jung Il-sung | Chunhyang |
| 9th | 2001 | Seo Jeong-min | Libera Me |
| 10th | 2002 | Park Hyun-cheol | YMCA Baseball Team |
| 11th | 2003 | Kim Hyung-koo | Memories of Murder |
| 12th | 2004 | Chung Chung-hoon | Oldboy |
| 13th | 2005 | Choi Young-hwan | Blood Rain |
| 14th | 2006 | Yun Hong-shik | Blue Swallow |
| 15th | 2007 | Park Hyun-cheol | 200 Pounds Beauty |
| 16th | 2008 | Jung Han-cheol | Crossing |
| 17th | 2009 | Park Hee-ju | Portrait of a Beauty |
| 18th | 2010 | Kim Seong-bok, Kim Yong-heung | Moss |
| 29th | 2025 | Kim Woo-hyung | No Other Choice |

== Best Lighting ==
| # | Year | Lighting designer | Film |
|---|---|---|---|
| 1st | 1990 | —N/a | —N/a |
| 2nd | 1991 | Im Jae-young | Death Song |
| 3rd | 1992 | Kim Kang-il | Walking All the Way to Heaven |
| 4th | 1993 | Kim Dong-ho | Hwa-Om-Kyung |
| 5th | 1994 | Lee Min-bu | The Taebaek Mountains |
| 6th | 1995 | Kim Dong-hoo | A Single Spark |
| 7th | 1999 | Lee Ju-saeng | A Promise |
| 8th | 2000 | Lee Min-bu | Chunhyang |
| 8th | 2000 | Im Jae-young | Joint Security Area |
| 9th | 2001 | Lee Seung-gu | The Last Witness |
| 10th | 2002 | —N/a | —N/a |
| 11th | 2003 | Park Hyun-won | The Classic |
| 12th | 2004 | Ji Gil-soo | Fighter in the Wind |
| 13th | 2005 | Kim Sung-kwan | Blood Rain |
| 14th | 2006 | Lee Kang-san | The Host |
| 15th | 2007 | Im Jae-young | Hwang Jin-yi |
| 16th | 2008 | Park Se-mun | Shadows in the Palace |
| 17th | 2009 | Park Hyun-won | Thirst |
| 18th | 2010 | Kang Dae-hee | Moss |
Discontinued

== Best Editing ==
| # | Year | Editor | Film |
|---|---|---|---|
| 1st | 1990 | Kim Hyeon | Black Republic |
| 2nd | 1991 | Yeo Dong-chun | Death Song |
| 3rd | 1992 | Lee Kyeong-ja | Our Twisted Hero |
| 4th | 1993 | —N/a | —N/a |
| 5th | 1994 | —N/a | —N/a |
| 6th | 1995 | —N/a | —N/a |
| 7th | 1999 | —N/a | —N/a |
| 8th | 2000 | —N/a | —N/a |
| 9th | 2001 | —N/a | —N/a |
| 10th | 2002 | —N/a | —N/a |
| 11th | 2003 | Kim Sun-min | Memories of Murder |
| 12th | 2004 | Kim Sang-bum | Oldboy |
| 13th | 2005 | Kim Sang-bum | Blood Rain |
| 14th | 2006 | Shin Min-kyung | Tazza: The High Rollers |
| 15th | 2007 | Park Gok-ji | 200 Pounds Beauty |
| 16th | 2008 | Lee Hyeon-mi | Love Exposure |
| 17th | 2009 | Park Gok-ji | Portrait of a Beauty |
| 18th | 2010 | Ko Im-pyo | Moss |
Discontinued

== Best Art Direction ==
| # | Year | Art director | Film |
|---|---|---|---|
| 1st | 1990 | —N/a | —N/a |
| 2nd | 1991 | Jo Yong-san | Death Song |
| 3rd | 1992 | Jo Yong-san | Walking All the Way to Heaven |
| 4th | 1993 | Kim Yoon-joon | Sopyonje |
| 5th | 1994 | —N/a | —N/a |
| 6th | 1995 | —N/a | —N/a |
| 7th | 1999 | —N/a | —N/a |
| 8th | 2000 | —N/a | —N/a |
| 9th | 2001 | —N/a | —N/a |
| 10th | 2002 | Kang Seung-yong | YMCA Baseball Team |
| 11th | 2003 | Oh Sang-man | Spring, Summer, Fall, Winter... and Spring |
| 12th | 2004 | Yoon Joo-hoon | Hypnotized |
| 13th | 2005 | —N/a | —N/a |
| 14th | 2006 | —N/a | —N/a |
| 16th | 2008 | Kim Hyeon-ok | Crossing |
| 17th | 2009 | Lee Ha-jun | Portrait of a Beauty |
| 18th | 2010 | Yang Hok-sam, Jang Seok-jin | Bestseller |
Discontinued

== Best Music ==
| # | Year | Composer | Film |
|---|---|---|---|
| 1st | 1990 | Shin Byeong-ha | North Korean Partisan in South Korea |
| 2nd | 1991 | Shin Byeong-ha | Fly High Run Far |
| 3rd | 1992 | Shin Byeong-ha | White Badge |
| 4th | 1993 | Lee Jong-gu | Hwa-Om-Kyung |
| 5th | 1994 | Lee Cheol-hyeok | Manmubang |
| 6th | 1995 | Kim Soo-chul | My Dear Keum-hong |
| 7th | 1999 | Won Il | Spring in My Hometown |
| 8th | 2000 | Jo Yeong-wook | Joint Security Area |
| 9th | 2001 | —N/a | —N/a |
| 10th | 2002 | Baik Hyun-jhin, Jang Young-gyu | Sympathy for Mr. Vengeance |
| 11th | 2003 | Jo Yeong-wook | The Classic |
| 12th | 2004 | Jang Young-gyu | Hypnotized |
| 13th | 2005 | Bang Jun-seok | Crying Fist |
| 14th | 2006 | Lee Dong-joon | Lump Sugar |
| 15th | 2007 | Shim Hyun-jung | Once in a Summer |
| 16th | 2008 | Kim Tae-seong | Crossing |
| 17th | 2009 | Kim Joon-seok | Lifting King Kong |
| 18th | 2010 | Jo Yeong-wook | Moss |
Discontinued

== Best Planning/Producer ==
| # | Year | Producer | Film |
|---|---|---|---|
| 6th | 1995 | Junjun Cinema | 48+1 |
| 7th | 1999 | Lee Kwang-mo | Spring in My Hometown |
| 8th | 2000 | Lee Tae-won | Chunhyang |
| 9th | 2001 | Oh Ki-min | Take Care of My Cat |
| 10th | 2002 | Myung Films | YMCA Baseball Team |
| 11th | 2003 | Lee Seung-jae | Spring, Summer, Fall, Winter... and Spring |
| 12th | 2004 | Kim Dong-won | Repatriation |
| 13th | 2005 | Oh Jeong-wan, Lee Yoo-jin | All for Love |
| 14th | 2006 | —N/a | —N/a |
| 15th | 2007 | —N/a | —N/a |
| 16th | 2008 | —N/a | —N/a |
| 17th | 2009 | Han Gil-ro | Lifting King Kong |
| 18th | 2010 | Chung Tae-won | 71: Into the Fire |
Discontinued

== Technical Award ==
| # | Year | Recipient | Film |
|---|---|---|---|
| 1st | 1990 | Kim Kyeong-il, Lee Young-gil | North Korean Partisan in South Korea |
| 2nd | 1991 | Yang Dae-ho | Death Song |
| 3rd | 1992 | Kim Seung-ho | Our Twisted Hero |
| 3rd | 1992 | —N/a | Come Back, Frog Boys |
| 4th | 1993 | —N/a | —N/a |
| 5th | 1994 | Kim Hyeon (editing); Kim Seon-jin (makeup) | The Rules of the Game |
| 6th | 1995 | Hyun Dong-choon (editing) | 48+1 |
| 6th | 1995 | Jang In-hwan (makeup) | 301, 302 |
| 6th | 1995 | Kim Seong-moon (special effects) | 301, 302 |
| 7th | 1999 | Kim Hyeon (editing) | City of the Rising Sun |
| 7th | 1999 | Oh Sang-man (art direction) | Art Museum by the Zoo |
| 8th | 2000 | Kim Hyeon, Oh Sang-man (art direction) | Joint Security Area |
| 8th | 2000 | Kim Cheol-seok | Nowhere to Hide |
| 9th | 2001 | Kim Hyeon | Musa |
| 9th | 2001 | Jeong Do-an | Libera Me |
| 10th | 2002 | Im Jae-young | YMCA Baseball Team |
| 11th | 2003 | Choi Tae-young | Once Upon a Time in a Battlefield |
| 12th | 2004 | Kang Jong-ik | Taegukgi |
| 13th | 2005 | Shin Jae-ho | Blood Rain |
| 14th | 2006 | Kim Suk-won | Hanbando |
| 14th | 2006 | Jang Hwi-cheol | The Host |
| 15th | 2007 | Lee Seung-chul | 200 Pounds Beauty |
| 15th | 2007 | Jung Ku-ho | Hwang Jin-yi |
| 16th | 2008 | Choi Tae-young | The Chaser |
| 17th | 2009 | Lee Seung-chul, Lee Sang-joon (sound) | Take Off |
| 17th | 2009 | Hong Jang-pyo, Jeong Seong-jin (image) | Take Off |
| 18th | 2010 | Park Joon-oh, Park Jong-geun (sound) | 71: Into the Fire |
| 19th | 2014 | Jeong Seong-jin | Mr. Go |
| 20th | 2015 | Choi Tae-young (sound) | The Admiral: Roaring Currents |
| 21st | 2016 | Cho Yong-seok (visual effects) | The Tiger: An Old Hunter's Tale |
| 22nd | 2017 | Kwak Tae-yong | Train to Busan |
| 23rd | 2018 | Kim Jee-yong | The Fortress |
| 24th | 2019 | Pi Dae-sung | Rampant |
| 25th | 2020 | Kim Young-ho (cinematography) | The Battle: Roar to Victory |
| 26th | 2021 | Lee Mok-won, Yoo Chung, Park Joon-young (Production design) | Peninsula |
| 27th | 2022 | Choi Young-hwan (Cinematography) | Escape from Mogadishu |

== Special Jury Prize ==
| # | Year | Recipient | Film |
|---|---|---|---|
| 1st | 1990 | —N/a | —N/a |
| 2nd | 1991 | —N/a | On a Starry Night |
| 3rd | 1992 | —N/a | Sir Dinosaur; Marriage Story |
| 4th | 1993 | —N/a | In the Handful of Time; Mother's Field |
| 5th | 1994 | Choi Myung-gil | Rosy Life |
| 5th | 1994 | Shin Chul | Kumiho |
| 6th | 1995 | —N/a | Mugoonghwa - Korean National Flower |
| 7th | 1999 | —N/a | —N/a |
| 8th | 2000 | CNP Entertainment | Die Bad |
| 9th | 2001 | Jeong Jae-eun | Take Care of My Cat |
| 10th | 2002 | Lee Jeong-hyang | The Way Home |
| 11th | 2003 | Kim Yoo-jin | Wild Card |
| 12th | 2004 | Kang Woo-suk | Silmido |
| 12th | 2004 | Kang Je-gyu | Taegukgi |
| 12th | 2004 | Park Chan-wook | Oldboy |
| 13th | 2005 | Min Kyu-dong | All for Love |
| 14th | 2006 | Park Joong-hoon | Radio Star |
| 15th | 2007 | Heo In-moo | Herb |
| 16th | 2008 | Cha In-pyo | Crossing |
| 17th | 2009 | Yang Ik-june | Breathless |
| 17th | 2009 | Lee Hae-joon | Castaway on the Moon |
| 18th | 2010 | Chung Tae-won | 71: Into the Fire |
| 19th | 2014 | —N/a | —N/a |
| 20th | 2015 | Woo Moon-gi | The King of Jokgu |
| 21st | 2016 | —N/a | —N/a |
| 23rd | 2018 | Ryan Kwon (권순중 감독) | Flower Hands (꽃손) |
| 28th | 2023 | Lee Han | Honey Sweet |
| 28th | 2023 | Yoo Hae-jin | Honey Sweet |
| 29th | 2025 | Lee Sung-min | No Other Choice |

== Various ==
| # | Year | Category | Recipient | Film |
|---|---|---|---|---|
| 1st | 1990 | Achievement Award | Yoon Bong-choon, Lee Kyu-hwan | —N/a |
| 2nd | 1991 | Best Costume Design | Kim Young-joo, Ha Young-soo, Lee Hae-yoon | Death Song |
| 3rd | 1992 | Best Costume Design | Lee Kyung-hee, Shim Yoon-joo | Marriage Story |
| 4th | 1993 | Best Visual Effects | Lee Moon-geol | Mother's Field |
| 5th | 1994 | 신인장려상 | Lee Jae-rak | 자정 이후 |
| 6th | 1995 | 장려상 | Arirang Film | Light in My Heart |
| 8th | 2000 | Best New Cinematographer | Hong Kyung-pyo | Il Mare |
| 8th | 2000 | Achievement Award | Kim Han-seob | —N/a |
| 8th | 2000 | Special Acting Award | Lee Mu-jeong | Truth Game |
| 10th | 2002 | 100th Anniversary of the Chunsa Film Art Awards; Commemoration Achievement Award | Im Kwon-taek (director); Jung Il-sung (cinematographer); Lee Tae-won (president of Taeheung Film Studios) | —N/a |
| 11th | 2003 | Achievement Award for the Development of Korean Cinema | Kim Dae-jung | —N/a |
| 12th | 2004 | Achievement Award | Yang Ki-hwan (film stills); Ahn Sung-ki (screen quota cultural solidarity) | —N/a |
| 14th | 2006 | Best Costume Design | Kwon Yoo-jin | Blue Swallow |
| 17th | 2009 | Ensemble Acting Award | Lee Jae-eung, Choi Jae-hwan, Ha Jung-woo, Kim Ji-seok, Kim Dong-wook | Take Off |
| 18th | 2010 | Special Acting Award | Park Joong-hoon | My Dear Desperado |
| 19th | 2014 | Special Achievement Award | Kang Dae-jin (president of the National Association of Theatre Owners) | —N/a |
| 20th | 2015 | Special Audience Award for Best Film | —N/a | Ode to My Father |
| 20th | 2015 | Special Award for Contribution to Film Development | Myung Films | —N/a |
| 21st | 2016 | Special Achievement Award | Im Kwon-taek | —N/a |
| 21st | 2016 | Special Audience Award for Best Film | —N/a | Spirits' Homecoming |
| 22nd | 2017 | Special Achievement Award | Kim Soo-yong | —N/a |
| 22nd | 2017 | Special Audience Award for Best Film | —N/a | Train to Busan |
| 23rd | 2018 | Special Achievement Award | Ju Heo-seong, Jang Na-ra | —N/a |
| 23rd | 2018 | Special Audience Award for Best Film | —N/a | Along with the Gods: The Two Worlds |
| 24th | 2019 | Special Achievement Award | Jung Jin-woo | —N/a |
| 24th | 2019 | Special Popularity Award | Lee Sung-kyung | Miss & Mrs. Cops |
| 24th | 2019 | Special Popularity Award | Uhm Tae-goo | The Great Battle |
| 24th | 2019 | Special Audience Award for Best Film | —N/a | Extreme Job |
| 24th | 2019 | Special Screenplay Award | Moon Shin-goo | Original Sin |
| 24th | 2019 | Asian Award for Actor/Actress | Li Yixiao | Dato'f Sri Eizlan bin Md Yusof |
| 24th | 2019 | Asian Award for Director | Vonin | —N/a |
| 24th | 2019 | Asian Award for Documentary Category | Lee Seung-hyun | A Long Way Around |
| 26th | 2021 | Achievement Award | Lee Won-se | —N/a |
| 26th | 2021 | Achievement Award | Park Jong-won | —N/a |
| 26th | 2021 | Audiences' Choice Award for Most Popular Film | Deliver Us from Evil | |
| 26th | 2021 | Special Award: Chunsa International Director's Award | Lee Isaac Chung | Minari |
| 26th | 2021 | Special Award for Feature Film | Cho Jung-rae | The Singer |
| 27th | 2022 | Achievement Award | Lee Jang-ho | —N/a |
| 27th | 2022 | Achievement Award | Shin Seung-soo | —N/a |
| 27th | 2022 | Audiences' Choice Award for Most Popular Film | The Roundup | |
| 27th | 2022 | Special Award: Chunsa International Director's Award | Hirokazu Kore-eda | Broker |
| 28th | 2023 | Achievement Award | Kang Beom-gu | North Star |
| 28th | 2023 | Achievement Award | Kim Jeong-yong | Government Affairs Shinkwon |
| 28th | 2023 | Special Award | Shin Sang-ok | Winter Story |
| 28th | 2023 | Un Certain Regard Director Award | July Jung | Next Sohee |
| 29th | 2025 | Film Directors' Choices for Best Actor | Sul Kyung-gu | Good News |
| 29th | 2025 | Best Director Award in OTT Category | Byun Sung-hyun | Good News |
| 29th | 2025 | Best Acting Award in OTT Category | Kim Go-eun | The Price of Confession |
| 29th | 2025 | Best Documentary | Yang Hee | Words from the Wind |
| 29th | 2025 | New Star Award | Dahyun | You Are the Apple of My Eye |

== Beautiful Artist in Film Award ==
| # | Year | Recipient |
|---|---|---|
| 16th | 2008 | Yoon Il-bong |
| 17th | 2009 | Choi Seok-gyu |
| 18th | 2010 | Moon Hee |
| 29th | 2025 | Yang Yun-ho |

== Korean Cultural Award ==
| # | Year | Recipient |
|---|---|---|
| 16th | 2008 | Shin Hyun-joon |
| 17th | 2009 | Choi Jung-won |
| 17th | 2009 | Jung Joon-ho |

== Chunsa 예술인 Award ==
| # | Year | Recipient |
|---|---|---|
| 2nd | 1991 | Kwon Young-soon |
| 3rd | 1992 | Kim Il-hae |
| 4th | 1993 | Choi Hoon |
| 5th | 1994 | Lee Chang-geun |
| 6th | 1995 | Im Kwon-taek |
| 7th | 1999 | Hwang Moon-pyeong |
| 8th | 2000 | —N/a |
| 9th | 2001 | —N/a |
| 10th | 2002 | —N/a |
| 11th | 2003 | Jang Dong-hwi |

== Chunsa Daesang (Grand Prize) ==
| # | Year | Recipient |
|---|---|---|
| 16th | 2008 | Kim Soo-yong |
| 17th | 2009 | Choi Eun-hee |
| 18th | 2010 | Lee Dae-geun |
