= List of South Korean films of 1998 =

A list of films produced in South Korea in 1998:

Title	Director	Cast	Genre	Notes
1998
An Affair	E J-yong	Lee Mi-sook; Lee Jung-jae		
Art Museum by the Zoo	Lee Jeong-hyang	Shim Eun-ha; Lee Sung-jae		
Bedroom & Courtroom	Kang Woo-suk			
Birdcage Inn	Kim Ki-duk	Lee Ji-eun		
Bye June	Choi Ho	Kim Ha-neul; Yoo Ji-tae		
Christmas in August	Hur Jin-ho	Han Suk-kyu; Shim Eun-ha		
Extra	Shin Seung-soo			
First Kiss	Kim Tae-kyun	Ahn Jae-wook; Choi Ji-woo		
The Flight of the Bee	Min Byung-hun			A Tajik-Korean co-production shot in Tajikistan
Girls' Night Out	Im Sang-soo	Jin Hee-kyung; Cho Jae-hyun; Kang Soo-yeon		
The Happenings	Jang Jin			
If the Sun Rises in the West	Lee Eun	Im Chang-jung; Ko So-young		
Kazoku Cinema	Park Chul-soo			Japan-Korea co-production, First Korean film made in Japan with Japanese actors
Naked Being/Kka	Chung Ji-young			
A Night on the Water	Kang Jung-su			
Paradise Lost	Jang Kil-soo			
The Power of Kangwon Province	Hong Sang-soo			
A Promise	Kim Yoo-jin	Park Shin-yang; Jeon Do-yeon		
The Quiet Family	Kim Jee-woon	Choi Min-sik; Song Kang-ho		
Scent of a Man	Jang Hyun-su			
The Soul Guardians	Park Kwang-choon	Ahn Sung-ki; Chu Sang-mi		
Spring in My Hometown	Lee Kwang-mo			
The Story of a Man	Shim Seung-bo			
Taekwondo	Moon Seung-wook			
Tie a Yellow Ribbon/Jjim	Han Ji-seung			
Too Tired to Die	Chin Wonsuk			
Two Cops 3				
Whispering Corridors	Park Ki-hyung	Choi Kang-hee; Kim Gyu-ri		
Zzang	Yang Yun-ho			
