= Kang Shin-il =

South Korean actor (born 1960)

- Born: November 26, 1960 (age 65); Uijeongbu, Gyeonggi-do, South Korea
- Education: Kyung Hee University - Electronic Engineering
- Occupation: Actor
- Years active: 1985–present
- Agent: Starvillage Entertainment

Korean name
- Hangul: 강신일
- Hanja: 姜信一
- RR: Gang Sinil
- MR: Kang Sinil

Kang Shin-il (born November 26, 1960) is a South Korean actor. Kang graduated from Kyung Hee University with a degree in electronic engineering, but he soon put aside his studies and spent most of his time in Daehangno, Seoul's theater district, where he formed a troupe called Testimony that performed at smaller venues. In 1985, he made his acting debut in Chilsu and Mansu, and soon gained fame as a stage actor in plays such as Kimchigook Goes Crazy and Chronicles of Han. He appeared onscreen for the first time in the 1988 film adaptation of Chilsu and Mansu and became a prolific supporting actor in Korean cinema and television (notably in Kang Woo-suk's Public Enemy franchise), while continuing to do theater. In 2007, Kang was diagnosed with liver cancer, but after recovering from surgery, he resumed his acting career.

== Filmography ==
=== Film ===
| Year | Title | Role |
|---|---|---|
| 1988 | Chilsu and Mansu | |
| 1999 | The Uprising | Ma Chan-sam |
| 2001 | Friend | Sang-taek's father |
| 2002 | Public Enemy | Chief investigator Uhm |
| 2002 | Jail Breakers | Kim Chi-guk |
| 2003 | Sword in the Moon | Joo-sang |
| 2003 | The Legend of the Evil Lake | Minister Mun-su |
| 2003 | Silmido | Keun-jae |
| 2004 | Some | Chief Oh |
| 2005 | Another Public Enemy | Kim Shin-il |
| 2005 | Mr. Socrates | Beom-pyo |
| 2006 | Love Phobia | Cha Jo-kang's father |
| 2006 | Hanbando | Kim Yu-shik |
| 2006 | Maundy Thursday | Manager Lee |
| 2007 | Black House | Park Choong-bae |
| 2008 | Public Enemy Returns | Squad chief Uhm |
| 2009 | My Girlfriend Is an Agent | Doctor Noh Hyung-kyu |
| 2009 | Closer to Heaven | Lee Hak-cheon (cameo) |
| 2009 | Triangle | Vice president Son |
| 2010 | A Little Pond | Mr. Kang |
| 2010 | Moss | District prosecutor |
| 2011 | Heartbeat | Director Choi |
| 2011 | G-Love | Vice principal |
| 2011 | Always | Boxing gym manager Choi |
| 2012 | Deranged | Doctor Hwang |
| 2013 | Fists of Legend | Director Jo |
| 2013 | Project Cheonan Ship | Documentary narrator |
| 2013 | Blood and Ties | Han Sang-soo (cameo) |
| 2014 | See, Beethoven | Beethoven |
| 2016 | Pandora | Mr. Kong |
| 2016 | The Great Actor | Dae-ho |
| 2017 | Duck Town | |
| 2017 | The Prison | General manager No |
| 2017 | Roman Holiday | Chief Ahn |
| 2019 | Black Money | Investigator Jang |
| 2020 | Beyond That Mountain | Father Yoon |
| 2022 | I Want to Know Your Parents | Principal |
| 2023 | My Heart Puppy | Jin-guk's uncle |
| TBA | Hwapyeong Spot | |

=== Television series ===
| Year | Title | Role |
|---|---|---|
| 2004 | Sunlight Pours Down | Detective Nam |
| 2004 | MBC Best Theater "Jung Malg-eum, Action Movie Star" | Director Ma |
| 2004 | Oh Feel Young | Managing director Min Ki-baek |
| 2005 | Green Rose | Investigator Jo |
| 2005 | Resurrection | Seo Jae-soo |
| 2006 | Hello, God | Jang Pil-goo |
| 2006 | Alone in Love | Man on blind date (cameo, episode 9) |
| 2006 | Someday | Choi Jae-deok's father |
| 2007 | Mermaid Story | Detective Kang |
| 2007 | Flowers for My Life | Choi Pil-goo |
| 2007 | Good Morning Shanghai | Hao Yun's father |
| 2007 | Golden Bride | Kang Woo-nam |
| 2008 | Detective Mr. Lee | Section chief Kang |
| 2009 | The Return of Iljimae | Kang Se-wook |
| 2009 | Heading to the Ground | Lee Choong-ryul |
| 2010 | Personal Taste | Park Chul-han |
| 2010 | My Country Calls | Deputy Shin Ki-joon |
| 2010 | Kim Su-ro, The Iron King | Seon-do |
| 2010 | The President | Lee Chi-soo |
| 2011 | The Duo | Sung Cho-shi |
| 2011 | Lie to Me | Gong Joon-ho |
| 2011 | Kimchi Family | Lee Ki-chan |
| 2012 | God of War | Monk Soo-beop |
| 2012 | The Chaser | Squad chief detective Hwang |
| 2012 | Glass Mask | Kang In-chul |
| 2013 | Flower of Revenge | Mr. Jeon |
| 2013 | When a Man Falls in Love | Seo Kyung-wook |
| 2013 | Secret Love | Ahn In-hwan |
| 2013 | Passionate Love | Han Sung-bok |
| 2013 | Stranger | Detective |
| 2013 | KBS Drama Special "The Unwelcome Guest" | Gook-seo |
| 2014 | Emergency Couple | Oh Tae-seok |
| 2014 | God's Gift: 14 Days | Kim Nam-joon |
| 2014 | Triangle | Hwang Jung-man |
| 2014 | Bad Guys | Nam Gu-hyeon |
| 2014 | Pinocchio | Lee Young-tak |
| 2016 | Descendants of the Sun | Lieutenant General Yoon |
| 2016 | My Lawyer, Mr. Jo | Jang Shin-woo |
| 2017 | Whisper | Shin Chang-ho |
| 2017 | Man to Man | Im-Suk Hoon |
| 2018 | Sketch | Moon Jae-hyun |
| 2018 | Mr. Sunshine | Lee Jung-moon |
| 2018 | Room No. 9 | Eulji Sung |
| 2019 | Doctor Prisoner | Kim Sang-chun |
| 2020 | When the Weather Is Fine | Im Jong-pil |
| 2020 | Nobody Knows | Seo Sang-won |
| 2020 | Fatal Promise | Kang Il-seop |
| 2021 | Police University | Seo Sang-hak |
| 2022 | Bloody Heart | Kim Chi-won |
| 2023 | Numbers | Jin Tae-soo |
| 2023–2024 | Korea–Khitan War | Monk Jin-gwan |
| 2024 | Love Song for Illusion | Jin Mu-dal |
| 2025 | Resident Playbook | Im Dong-ju |
| 2026 | Bloodhounds | Heo Cheong-ho |

=== Variety show ===
| Year | Title | Notes |
|---|---|---|
| 2007 | Yellow River | Documentary narrator |
| 2013 | Tracking Report: Watching | Host |

=== Music video appearances ===
| Year | Song | Artist |
|---|---|---|
| 2005 | "As I Live" (살다가) | SG Wannabe |

== Theater ==
| Year | Title | Role | Reprised |
|---|---|---|---|
| 1985 | Chilsu and Mansu | | |
| | A Crying Bird on the Border | | |
| | 달라진 저승 | | |
| | April 9 | | |
| | A Story of Old Thieves | | |
| | Thomas' Testimony | | |
| | Kimchigook Goes Crazy | | |
| | Faust | | |
| | Na Woon-gyu | | |
| | The Caucasian Chalk Circle | | |
| | Luther | | |
| | What Ever Happened to Baby Jane? | | |
| | A Song Like This | | |
| | Princess Deokhye | | |
| | 멍추같은 영감 | | |
| | 얼굴 뒤의 얼굴 | | |
| | Bone and Flesh | | |
| | 떠벌이 우리 아버지 암에 걸리셨네 | | |
| | Mr. Peace | | |
| | Moskito | | |
| | Made in Japan | | |
| | Bride of May | | |
| | Come and See Me | | |
| 2001 | Statement | | 2006 |
| 2004 | Chronicles of Han | | |
| 2005 | Dry and Worn Away | | |
| 2006 | Han Jeong-rim's Music Diary | (cameo) | 2012, 2013 |
| 2007 | Byun | | |
| 2009 | Namhansanseong | Choi Myung-kil | |
| 2010 | Bieonso | | |
| 2010 | Sound of the Heavens, the Music of King Sejong | | 2012 |
| 2011 | Kang Shin-il and the Fox | | |
| 2011 | Red | Mark Rothko | 2013-2014 |
| 2012 | Samguk Yusa Project: A Dream | | |
| 2012 | There | Jang-woo | |
| 2012 | House of the Dead 2: The Rat Man / Nobel Prize in Literature Awards Speech | Writer | |
| 2013 | The Pitmen Painters | | |
| 2014 | Sad Play | Jang Man-ho | |
| 2014 | Why Do I Resent Only Small Things? | | |
| 2014 | Hoy! Style Magazine Show | | |
| 2015 | Sad Fate | Baek Yoon-seok | |
| 2022–2023 | Miners Painters | | |

== Awards and nominations ==
| Year | Award | Category | Nominated work | Result |
|---|---|---|---|---|
| 1996 | 19th Seoul Theater Festival: Modern Play Awards | Best Actor | | Won |
| 1996 | Critics' Association: Best 5 in Theater | Recipient | | Won |
| 1998 | 22nd Seoul International Performing Arts Festival | Best Actor | | Won |
| 1998 | The National Theater Association of Korea: Best 5 of the Year | Best Actor | | Won |
| 1999 | 35th Dong-A Theatre Awards | Best Actor | Kimchigook Goes Crazy | Won |
| 2002 | 10th Chunsa Film Art Awards | Best Supporting Actor | Public Enemy | Won |
| 2005 | 42nd Grand Bell Awards | Best Supporting Actor | Another Public Enemy | Nominated |
| 2005 | KBS Drama Awards | Best Supporting Actor | Resurrection | Nominated |
| 2008 | 45th Grand Bell Awards | Best Supporting Actor | Black House | Nominated |
| 2008 | 7th Korean Film Awards | Best Supporting Actor | Public Enemy Returns | Nominated |
