= Another Public Enemy =

- Theatrical release poster
- Hangul: 공공의 적 2
- Hanja: 公共의 敵 2
- RR: Gonggongui jeok 2
- MR: Konggongŭi chŏk 2
- Directed by: Kang Woo-suk
- Written by: Kim Hee-jae
- Produced by: Kang Woo-suk
- Starring: Sul Kyung-gu; Jung Joon-ho
- Cinematography: Kim Seong-bok
- Edited by: Ko Im-pyo
- Music by: Han Jae-kwon
- Production companies: CJ Entertainment; Kang Woo-suk Productions
- Distributed by: Cinema Service
- Release date: January 27, 2005 (South Korea)
- Running time: 148 minutes
- Country: South Korea
- Language: Korean
- Box office: US$23,248,003

Another Public Enemy is a 2005 South Korean neo-noir action thriller film and the film is a sequel to Public Enemy.

== Plot ==
Kang Chul-joong (Sul Kyung-gu), a prosecutor for the Seoul District attorney's office, is a unique one. He prefers going directly to the crime scene to reading files, his intuition and guts to logic and reason, and using weapons of force to sitting back watching his men get stabbed by criminals. And now, once again, his gets one of his gut feelings about a particular case, and wastes no time in getting involved in the Myung-sun Foundation case, during which he opening declares war on Han Sang-woo (Jung Joon-ho), the Public Enemy.

== Cast ==
- Sul Kyung-gu - Kang Chul-joong
- Jung Joon-ho - Han Sang-woo
- Kang Shin-il - Kim Shin-il
- Park Sang-wook - Kang Suk-shin
- Park Geun-hyung - Vice President
- Choi Jung-woo - Representative Kim
- Uhm Tae-woong - Song Jung-hoon

== Awards and nominations ==
2005 Grand Bell Awards

- Nomination - Best Actor - Sul Kyung-gu
- Nomination - Best Supporting Actor - Kang Shin-il
- Nomination - Best Original Screenplay - Kim Hee-jae

== See also ==
- List of Korean-language films
- Cinema of Korea
- Contemporary culture of South Korea
