= Grand Bell Awards =

South Korean film awards

- Hangul: 대종상 영화제
- Hanja: 大鐘賞 映畵祭
- RR: Daejongsang yeonghwaje
- MR: Taejongsang yŏnghwaje
- Awarded for: Excellence in cinematic achievements
- Country: South Korea
- Presented by: The Motion Pictures Association of Korea
- First award: 1962
- Final award: 2023
- Website: https://daejong.or.kr/

The Grand Bell Awards (Korean: 대종상 영화제; RR: Daejongsang yeonghwaje), also known as the Daejong Film Awards, are annual awards presented for excellence in film in South Korea. The Grand Bell Awards retains prestige as the oldest continuous film awards held in South Korea, and has been called the Korean equivalent of the American Academy Awards.

Since 2025, the trademark of the Grand Bell Awards officially belong to the Korea Film Planning Producers Association.

== History ==
The Grand Bell Awards ceremony has been hosted by the Ministry of Culture and Information since its inception in 1962. The awards were suspended for a few years starting in 1969 but were revived in 1972 following the establishment of the Korea Motion Picture Promotion Association, aiming to revitalize the then-stagnant South Korean film industry.

Over time, however, the Korean Film Industry Association, which managed the awards, became plagued by extravagant spending and frequent internal conflicts. This turmoil led to a decline in the ceremony's credibility and authority. The situation culminated during the 52nd ceremony in 2015, when all nominees for Best Actor and Best Actress publicly announced they would boycott the event.

In 2022, the Grand Bell Awards Normalization Promotion Committee, led by director Lee Jang-ho and chairman Yang Yoon-ho, was established to initiate reforms aimed at restoring the awards' reputation. The 59th ceremony took place on November 15, 2023, and was co-hosted for the first time by the Gyeonggi Arts Center at its Grand Theater and Convention Hall. The event was hosted by Cha In-pyo and Jang Do-yeon.

In December 2023, the Federation of Korean Filmmakers ((사)한국영화인총연합회), which hosted the Awards, was declared bankrupt by the Seoul Bankruptcy Court. As a result, the 60th ceremony was canceled. In November 2024, the trademark rights to the Daejong Film Festival were put up for sale, creating uncertainty about the future of the awards.

Subsequently, in 2025, the trademark and operational rights of the Grand Bell Awards were officially transferred to the Korea Film Planning Producers Association, marking a new phase for the event.

== Awards ==
=== Best Film ===
Best Film
#	Year	Film (English)	Film (Korean)	Director
1	1962	Prince Yeonsan	연산군	Shin Sang-ok
2	1963	The Memorial Gate for Virtuous Women	열녀문	Shin Sang-ok
3	1964	Kinship	혈맥	Kim Soo-yong
4	1965	Deaf Sam-yong	벙어리 삼룡이	Shin Sang-ok
5	1966	The Sea Village	갯마을	Kim Soo-yong
6	1967	Coming Back	귀로	Lee Man-hee
7	1968	Prince Daewon	대원군	Shin Sang-ok
8	1969	—N/a		
9	1970	—N/a		
10	1971	—N/a		
11	1972	Patriotic Martyr An Jung-gun	의사 안중근	Joo Dong-jin
12	1973	The General in Red Robes	홍의 장군	Lee Doo-yong
13	1974	The Land	토지	Kim Soo-yong
14	1975	Flame	불꽃	Yu Hyun-mok
15	1976	Mother	어머니	Im Won-shik
16	1977	Diary of Korean-Japanese War	난중일기	Jang Il-ho
17	1978	Police Story	경찰관	Lee Doo-yong
18	1979	The Hidden Hero	깃발없는 기수	Im Kwon-taek
19	1980	Son of Man	사람의 아들	Yu Hyun-mok
20	1981	Invited People	초대받은 성웅들	Choe Ha-won
21	1982	Come Unto Down	낮은 데로 임하소서	Lee Jang-ho
22	1983	Mulleya Mulleya	여인잔혹사 물레야 물레야	Lee Doo-yong
23	1984	Adultery Tree	자녀목	Chong Jin-u
24	1985	The Mother	어미	Park Chul-soo
25	1986	Pillar of Mist	안개기둥	Park Cheol-su
26	1987	Diary of King Yeonsan	연산일기	Im Kwon-taek
27	1989	Come Come Come Upward	아제아제 바라아제	Im Kwon-taek
28	1990	All That Falls Has Wings	추락하는 것은 날개가 있다	Chang Gil-soo
29	1991	Passion Portrait	젊은날의 초상	Kwak Ji-kyoon
30	1992	Fly High Run Far	개벽	Im Kwon-taek
31	1993	Sopyonje	서편제	Im Kwon-taek
32	1994	The Story of Two Women	두 여자 이야기	Lee Jung-gook
33	1995	The Eternal Empire	영원한 제국	Park Jong-won
34	1996	Henequen	애니깽	Kim Ho-sun
35	1997	The Contact	접속	Chang Yoon-hyun
36	1999	Spring in My Hometown	아름다운 시절	Lee Kwang-mo
37	2000	Peppermint Candy	박하사탕	Lee Chang-dong
38	2001	Joint Security Area	공동경비구역JSA	Park Chan-wook
39	2002	The Way Home	집으로	Lee Jeong-hyang
40	2003	Memories of Murder	살인의 추억	Bong Joon-ho
41	2004	Spring, Summer, Fall, Winter... and Spring	봄여름가을겨울그리고봄	Kim Ki-duk
42	2005	Marathon	말아톤	Jeong Yoon-chul
43	2006	King and the Clown	왕의 남자	Lee Joon-ik
44	2007	Family Ties	가족의 탄생	Kim Tae-yong
45	2008	The Chaser	추격자	Na Hong-jin
46	2009	The Divine Weapon	신기전	Kim Yoo-jin
47	2010	Poetry	시	Lee Chang-dong
48	2011	The Front Line	고지전	Jang Hoon
49	2012	Masquerade	광해: 왕이 된 남자	Choo Chang-min
50	2013	The Face Reader	관상	Han Jae-rim
51	2014	The Admiral: Roaring Currents	명량	Kim Han-min
52	2015	Ode to My Father	국제시장	Yoon Je-kyoon
53	2016	Inside Men	내부자들	Woo Min-ho
54	2017	A Taxi Driver	택시운전사	Jang Hoon
55	2018	Burning	버닝	Lee Chang-dong
56	2019	Parasite	기생충	Bong Joon-ho
57	2020	—N/a		
57	2021	—N/a		
58	2022	Decision to Leave	헤어질 결심	Park Chan-wook
59	2023	Concrete Utopia	콘크리트 유토피아	Um Tae-hwa

=== Best Director ===
Best Director
#	Year	Director	Film (English)	Film (Korean)
1	1962	Shin Sang-ok	The Houseguest and My Mother	사랑방 손님과 어머니
2	1963	Yu Hyun-mok	Freely Given	아낌없이 주련다
3	1964	Lee Man-hee	The Marines Who Never Returned	돌아오지 않는 해병
4	1965	Shin Sang-ok	Deaf Sam-yong	벙어리 삼룡이
5	1966	Yu Hyun-mok	Martyr	순교자
6	1967	Kim Soo-yong	Mist	안개
7	1968	Shin Sang-ok	Prince Daewon	대원군
8	1969	—N/a		
9	1970	—N/a		
10	1971	—N/a		
11	1972	Shin Sang-ok	Last Battle in Pyeongyang	평양폭격대
12	1973	Choi Hun	Narcissus	수선화
13	1974	Kim Soo-yong	The Land	토지
14	1975	Lee Man-hee	The Road to Sampo	삼포가는 길
15	1976	Seol Tae-ho	The Secret of Wonsan	원산공작
16	1977	Choi In-hyeon	Concentration	집념
17	1978	Im Kwon-taek	The Genealogy	족보
18	1979	Jung Jin-woo	I Saw the Wild Ginseng	심봤다
19	1980	Lee Jang-ho	A Fine, Windy Day	바람불어 좋은날
20	1981	Im Kwon-taek	Mandala	만다라
21	1982	Lee Jang-ho	Come Unto Down	낮은데로 임하소서
22	1983	Lee Doo-yong	Mulleya Mulleya	여인잔혹사 물레야 물레야
23	1984	Jung Jin-woo	Adultery Tree	자녀목
24	1985	Bae Chang-ho	Deep Blue Night	깊고 푸른밤
25	1986	Im Kwon-taek	Ticket	티켓
26	1987	Im Kwon-taek	Diary of King Yeonsan	연산일기
27	1989	Kim Ho-sun	Rainbow Over Seoul	서울 무지개
28	1990	Chang Gil-soo	All That Falls Has Wings	추락하는 것은 날개가 있다
29	1991	Kwak Ji-kyoon	Passion Portrait	젊은날의 초상
30	1992	Kim Ho-sun	Death Song	사의 찬미
31	1993	Im Kwon-taek	Sopyonje	서편제
32	1994	Jang Sun-woo	Passage to Buddha	화엄경
33	1995	Park Jong-won	The Eternal Empire	영원한 제국
34	1996	Kim Ho-sun	Henequen	애니깽
35	1997	Chung Ji-young	Blackjack	블랙잭
36	1999	Lee Kwang-mo	Spring in My Hometown	아름다운 시절
37	2000	Lee Chang-dong	Peppermint Candy	박하사탕
38	2001	Han Ji-seung	A Day	하루
39	2002	Song Hae-sung	Failan	파이란
40	2003	Bong Joon-ho	Memories of Murder	살인의 추억
41	2004	Park Chan-wook	Oldboy	올드보이
42	2005	Song Hae-sung	Rikidōzan	역도산
43	2006	Lee Joon-ik	King and the Clown	왕의 남자
44	2007	Bong Joon-ho	The Host	괴물
45	2008	Na Hong-jin	The Chaser	추격자
46	2009	Kim Yong-hwa	Take Off	국가대표
47	2010	Kang Woo-suk	Moss	이끼
48	2011	Kang Hyeong-cheol	Sunny	써니
49	2012	Choo Chang-min	Masquerade	광해: 왕이 된 남자
50	2013	Han Jae-rim	The Face Reader	관상
51	2014	Kim Seong-hun	A Hard Day	끝까지 간다
52	2015	Yoon Je-kyoon	Ode to My Father	국제시장
53	2016	Woo Min-ho	Inside Men	내부자들
54	2017	Lee Joon-ik	Anarchist from Colony	박열
55	2018	Jang Joon-hwan	1987: When the Day Comes	1987
56	2019	Bong Joon-ho	Parasite	기생충
57	2020	—N/a		
57	2021	—N/a		
58	2022	Byun Sung-hyun	Kingmaker	킹메이커
59	2023	Ryoo Seung-wan	Smugglers	밀수

=== Best Actor ===
Best Actor
#	Year	Actor	Film (English)	Film (Korean)
36	1999	Choi Min-sik	Shiri	쉬리
37	2000	Choi Min-soo	Phantom: The Submarine	유령
38	2001	Song Kang-ho	Joint Security Area	공동경비구역 JSA
39	2002	Sul Kyung-gu	Public Enemy	공공의 적
40	2003	Song Kang-ho	Memories of Murder	살인의 추억
41	2004	Choi Min-sik	Oldboy	올드보이
42	2005	Cho Seung-woo	Marathon	말아톤
43	2006	Kam Woo-sung	King and the Clown	왕의남자
44	2007	Ahn Sung-ki	Radio Star	라디오 스타
45	2008	Kim Yoon-seok	The Chaser	추격자
46	2009	Kim Myung-min	Closer to Heaven	내 사랑 내 곁에
47	2010	Won Bin	The Man from Nowhere	아저씨
48	2011	Park Hae-il	War of the Arrows	최종병기 활
49	2012	Lee Byung-hun	Masquerade	광해: 왕이 된 남자
50	2013	Ryu Seung-ryong	Miracle in Cell No. 7	7번방의 선물
50	2013	Song Kang-ho	The Face Reader	관상
51	2014	Choi Min-sik	The Admiral: Roaring Currents	명량
52	2015	Hwang Jung-min	Ode to My Father	국제시장
53	2016	Lee Byung-hun	Inside Men	내부자들
54	2017	Sul Kyung-gu	The Merciless	불한당: 나쁜 놈들의 세상
55	2018	Hwang Jung-min	The Spy Gone North	공작
55	2018	Lee Sung-min	The Spy Gone North	공작
56	2019	Lee Byung-hun	Ashfall	백두산
57	2020	—N/a		
57	2021	—N/a		
58	2022	Park Hae-il	Decision to Leave	헤어질 결심
59	2023	Lee Byung-hun	Concrete Utopia	콘크리트 유토피아

=== Best Actress ===
Best Actress
#	Year	Actress	Film (English)	Film (Korean)
36	1999	Shim Eun-ha	Art Museum by the Zoo	미술관 옆 동물원
37	2000	Jeon Do-yeon	The Harmonium in My Memory	내 마음의 풍금
38	2001	Ko So-young	A Day	하루
39	2002	Jun Ji-hyun	My Sassy Girl	엽기적인 그녀
40	2003	Lee Mi-yeon	Addicted	중독
41	2004	Moon So-ri	A Good Lawyer's Wife	바람난 가족
42	2005	Kim Hye-soo	Hypnotized	얼굴없는 미녀
43	2006	Jeon Do-yeon	You Are My Sunshine	너는 내 운명
44	2007	Kim Ah-joong	200 Pounds Beauty	미녀는 괴로워
45	2008	Kim Yun-jin	Seven Days	세븐 데이즈
46	2009	Soo Ae	Sunny	님은 먼곳에
47	2010	Yoon Jeong-hee	Poetry	시
48	2011	Kim Ha-neul	Blind	블라인드
49	2012	Jo Min-su	Pietà	피에타
50	2013	Uhm Jung-hwa	Montage	몽타주
51	2014	Son Ye-jin	The Pirates	해적: 바다로 간 산적
52	2015	Jun Ji-hyun	Assassination	암살
53	2016	Son Ye-jin	The Last Princess	덕혜옹주
54	2017	Choi Hee-seo	Anarchist from Colony	박열
55	2018	Na Moon-hee	I Can Speak	아이 캔 스피크
56	2019	Jung Yu-mi	Kim Ji-young: Born 1982	82년생 김지영
57	2020	—N/a		
57	2021	—N/a		
58	2022	Yum Jung-ah	Life Is Beautiful	인생은 아름다워
59	2023	Kim Seo-hyung	Greenhouse	비닐하우스

=== Best Supporting Actor ===
Best Supporting Actor
#	Year	Actor	Film (English)	Film (Korean)
36	1999	Jung Jin-young	A Promise	약속
37	2000	Joo Jin-mo	Happy End	해피엔드
38	2001	Jung Eun-pyo	Kilimanjaro	킬리만자로
39	2002	Nakamura Tōru	2009 Lost Memories	2009 로스트메모리즈
40	2003	Baek Yoon-sik	Save the Green Planet!	지구를 지켜라!
41	2004	Huh Joon-ho	Silmido	실미도
42	2005	Hwang Jung-min	A Bittersweet Life	달콤한 인생
43	2006	Yoo Hae-jin	King and the Clown	왕의 남자
44	2007	Kim Yoon-seok	Tazza: The High Rollers	타짜
45	2008	Yoo Jun-sang	Wide Awake	리턴
46	2009	Jin Goo	Mother	마더
47	2010	Kim Hee-ra	Poetry	시
47	2010	Song Sae-byeok	The Servant	방자전
48	2011	Jo Sung-ha	The Yellow Sea	황해
49	2012	Ryu Seung-ryong	Masquerade	광해:왕이 된 남자
50	2013	Jo Jung-suk	The Face Reader	관상
51	2014	Yoo Hae-jin	The Pirates	해적: 바다로 간 산적
52	2015	Oh Dal-su	Ode to My Father	국제시장
53	2016	Uhm Tae-goo	The Age of Shadows	밀정
54	2017	Bae Seong-woo	The King	더 킹
55	2018	Kim Joo-hyuk	Believer	독전
56	2019	Jin Seon-kyu	Extreme Job	극한직업
57	2020	—N/a		
57	2021	—N/a		
58	2022	Byun Yo-han	Hansan: Rising Dragon	한산: 용의 출현
59	2023	Oh Jung-se	Cobweb	거미집

=== Best Supporting Actress ===
Best Supporting Actress
#	Year	Actress	Film (English)	Film (Korean)
36	1999	Lee Mi-yeon	Whispering Corridors	여고괴담
37	2000	Kim Yeo-jin	Peppermint Candy	박하사탕
38	2001	Yoon So-jung	A Day	하루
39	2002	Bang Eun-jin	Address Unknown	수취인불명
40	2003	Song Yoon-ah	Jail Breakers	광복절 특사
41	2004	Kim Ga-yeon	Mr. Handy, Mr. Hong	어디선가 누군가에 무슨일이 생기면 틀림없이 나타난다 홍반장
42	2005	Na Moon-hee	Crying Fist	주먹이 운다
43	2006	Kang Hye-jung	Welcome to Dongmakgol	웰컴 투 동막골
44	2007	Shim Hye-jin	Over the Border	국경의 남쪽
45	2008	Kim Hae-sook	Open City	무방비 도시
46	2009	Kim Young-ae	Goodbye Mom	애자
47	2010	Youn Yuh-jung	The Housemaid	하녀
48	2011	Shim Eun-kyung	Romantic Heaven	로맨틱 헤븐
49	2012	Kim Hae-sook	The Thieves	도둑들
50	2013	Jang Young-nam	A Werewolf Boy	늑대소년
51	2014	Kim Young-ae	The Attorney	변호인
52	2015	Kim Hae-sook	The Throne	사도
53	2016	Ra Mi-ran	The Last Princess	덕혜옹주
54	2017	Kim So-jin	The King	더 킹
55	2018	Jin Seo-yeon	Believer	독전
56	2019	Lee Jung-eun	Parasite	기생충
57	2020	—N/a		
57	2021	—N/a		
58	2022	Lim Yoona	Confidential Assignment 2: International	공조2: 인터내셔날
59	2023	Kim Sun-young	Concrete Utopia	콘크리트 유토피아

=== Best New Director ===
Best New Director
#	Year	Director	Film (English)	Film (Korean)
36	1999	Hur Jin-ho	Christmas in August	8월의 크리스마스
36	1999	Lee Jeong-hyang	Art Museum by the Zoo	미술관 옆 동물원
37	2000	Min Byung-chun	Phantom: The Submarine	유령
38	2001	Im Sang-soo	Tears	눈물
39	2002	Lee Si-myung	2009 Lost Memories	2009 로스트메모리즈
40	2003	Jang Joon-hwan	Save the Green Planet!	지구를 지켜라!
41	2004	Choi Dong-hoon	The Big Swindle	범죄의 재구성
42	2005	Jeong Yoon-cheol	Marathon	말아톤
43	2006	Han Jae-rim	Rules of Dating	연애의 목적
44	2007	Kwon Hyung-jin	For Horowitz	호로비츠를 위하여
45	2008	Oh Jeom-kyun	Viva! Love	경축! 우리사랑
46	2009	Lee Ho-jae	The Scam	작전
47	2010	Jang Cheol-soo	Bedevilled	김복남 살인사건의 전말
48	2011	Yoon Sung-hyun	Bleak Night	파수꾼
49	2012	Choi Jong-tae	Hand in Hand	해로
50	2013	Jung Byung-gil	Confession of Murder	내가 살인범이다
51	2014	Yang Woo-suk	The Attorney	변호인
52	2015	Baik	The Beauty Inside	뷰티 인사이드
53	2016	Cho Jung-rae	Spirits' Homecoming	귀향
54	2017	Um Tae-hwa	Vanishing Time: A Boy Who Returned	가려진 시간
55	2018	Jeon Go-woon	Microhabitat	소공녀
56	2019	Kim Bora	House of Hummingbird	벌새
57	2020	—N/a		
57	2021	—N/a		
58	2022	Park Yi-woong	The Girl on a Bulldozer	불도저에 탄 소녀
59	2023	Ahn Tae-jin	The Night Owl	올빼미

=== Best New Actor ===
Best New Actor
#	Year	Actor	Film (English)	Film (Korean)
36	1999	Lee Sung-jae	Art Museum by the Zoo	미술관 옆 동물원
37	2000	Sul Kyung-gu	Peppermint Candy	박하사탕
38	2001	Ryoo Seung-bum	Die Bad	죽거나 혹은 나쁘거나
39	2002	Lee Jong-soo	Kick the Moon	신라의 달밤
40	2003	Kwon Sang-woo	My Tutor Friend	동갑내기 과외하기
41	2004	Kim Rae-won	My Little Bride	어린 신부
42	2005	Go Soo	Some	썸
43	2006	Lee Joon-gi	King and the Clown	왕의 남자
44	2007	Ryu Deok-hwan	Like a Virgin	천하장사 마돈나
45	2008	Daniel Henney	My Father	마이파더
46	2009	Kang Ji-hwan	My Girlfriend Is an Agent	7급 공무원
47	2010	Jung Woo	Wish	바람
48	2011	Lee Je-hoon	Bleak Night	파수꾼
49	2012	Kim Sung-kyun	The Neighbor	이웃사람
50	2013	Kim Soo-hyun	Secretly, Greatly	은밀하게 위대하게
51	2014	Park Yoo-chun	Haemoo	해무
52	2015	Lee Min-ho	Gangnam Blues	강남 1970
53	2016	Jung Ga-ram	4th Place	4등
54	2017	Park Seo-joon	Midnight Runners	청년경찰
55	2018	Lee Ga-sub	The Seeds of Violence	폭력의 씨앗
56	2019	Jung Hae-in	Tune in for Love	유열의 음악앨범
57	2020	—N/a		
57	2021	—N/a		
58	2022	Mu Jin-sung	Perhaps Love	장르만 로맨스
59	2023	Kim Seon-ho	The Childe	귀공자

=== Best New Actress ===
Best New Actress
#	Year	Actress	Film (English)	Film (Korean)
36	1999	Kim Yun-jin	Shiri	쉬리
37	2000	Lee Jae-eun	Yellow Hair	노랑머리
37	2000	Ha Ji-won	Truth Game	진실게임
38	2001	Lee Eun-ju	Virgin Stripped Bare by Her Bachelors	오! 수정
39	2002	Seo Won	Bad Guy	나쁜 남자
40	2003	Son Ye-jin	The Classic	클래식
41	2004	Moon Geun-young	My Little Bride	어린 신부
42	2005	Lee Chung-ah	Temptation of Wolves	늑대의 유혹
43	2006	Choo Ja-hyun	Bloody Tie	사생결단
44	2007	Jo Yi-jin	Over the Border	국경의 남쪽
45	2008	Han Ye-seul	Miss Gold Digger	용의주도 미스신
46	2009	Kim Kkot-bi	Breathless	똥파리
47	2010	Lee Min-jung	Cyrano Agency	시라노; 연애조작단
48	2011	Moon Chae-won	War of the Arrows	최종병기 활
49	2012	Kim Go-eun	A Muse	은교
50	2013	Seo Eun-ah	Act	짓
51	2014	Lim Ji-yeon	Obsessed	인간중독
52	2015	Lee Yoo-young	Late Spring	봄
53	2016	Kim Hwan-hee	The Wailing	곡성
54	2017	Choi Hee-seo	Anarchist from Colony	박열
55	2018	Kim Da-mi	The Witch: Part 1. The Subversion	마녀
56	2019	Jeon Yeo-been	After My Death	죄 많은 소녀
57	2020	—N/a		
57	2021	—N/a		
58	2022	Kim Hye-yoon	The Girl on a Bulldozer	불도저에 탄 소녀
59	2023	Kim Si-eun	Next Sohee	다음 소희

=== Best Screenplay ===
Best Screenplay
#	Year	Screenwriter	Film (English)	Film (Korean)
36	1999	(Original); Oh Seung-uk	Christmas in August	8월의 크리스마스
36	1999	(Adapted); Woo Byung-gil	Kazoku Cinema	가족 시네마
37	2000	(Original); Lee Chang-dong	Peppermint Candy	박하사탕
37	2000	(Adapted); Lee Young-jae	The Harmonium in My Memory	내 마음의 풍금
38	2001	Go Eun-nim	Bungee Jumping of Their Own	번지점프를 하다
39	2002	(Original); Lee Jeong-hyang	The Way Home	집으로
39	2002	(Adapted); Kwak Jae-yong	My Sassy Girl	엽기적인 그녀
40	2003	Jang Kyu-sung, Lee Won-hyeong	My Teacher, Mr. Kim	선생 김봉두
41	2004	(Original); Choi Dong-hoon	The Big Swindle	범죄의 재구성
41	2004	(Adapted); Kim Hee-jae	Silmido	실미도
42	2005	(Original); Jeong Yoon-cheol, Yoon Jin-ho, Song Ye-jin	Marathon	말아톤
42	2005	(Adapted); Kim Young-ha	A Moment to Remember	내 머리 속의 지우개
43	2006	Choi Seok-hwan	King and the Clown	왕의 남자
44	2007	Kim Tae-yong, Sung Ki-young	Family Ties	가족의 탄생
45	2008	Park Yoon	Viva! Love	경축! 우리사랑
46	2009	Kim Ki-duk, Jang Hoon	Rough Cut	영화는 영화다
47	2010	Lee Chang-dong	Poetry	시
48	2011	Choi Min-seok	Blind	블라인드
49	2012	Hwang Jo-yoon	Masquerade	광해: 왕이 된 남자
50	2013	Lee Hwan-kyung	Miracle in Cell No. 7	7번방의 선물
51	2014	Yang Woo-suk, Yoon Hyeon-ho	The Attorney	변호인
52	2015	Park Su-jin	Ode to My Father	국제시장
53	2016	Woo Min-ho	Inside Men	내부자들
54	2017	Han Jae-rim	The King	더 킹
55	2018	Jeon Go-woon	Microhabitat	소공녀
56	2019	Bong Joon-ho, Han Jin-won	Parasite	기생충
57	2020	—N/a		
57	2021	—N/a		
58	2022	Park Chan-wook, Jung Seo-kyung	Decision to Leave	헤어질 결심
59	2023	Ahn Tae-jin, Hyun Eun-mi	The Night Owl	올빼미

=== Best Cinematography ===
Best Cinematography
#	Year	Cinematographer	Film (English)	Film (Korean)
36	1999	Kim Hyung-koo	Spring in My Hometown	아름다운 시절
37	2000	Jeong Kwang-seok, Song Haeng-ki	Nowhere to Hide	인정사정 볼 것 없다
38	2001	Seo Jeong-min	Libera Me	리베라 메
39	2002	Kim Yun-su	The Last Witness	흑수선
40	2003	Jeong Kwang-seok	Jail Breakers	광복절 특사
41	2004	Hong Kyung-pyo	Taegukgi	태극기 휘날리며
42	2005	Kim Hyung-koo	Rikidōzan	역도산
43	2006	Ji Gil-woong	King and the Clown	왕의 남자
44	2007	Park Hyun-cheol	200 Pounds Beauty	미녀는 괴로워
45	2008	Lee Sung-jae	The Chaser	추격자
46	2009	Park Hee-ju	Portrait of a Beauty	미인도
47	2010	Kim Sung-bok	Moss	이끼
48	2011	Kim Woo-hyung	The Front Line	고지전
49	2012	Lee Tae-yoon	Masquerade	광해: 왕이 된 남자
50	2013	Choi Young-hwan	The Berlin File	베를린
51	2014	Kim Tae-seong	A Hard Day	끝까지 간다
52	2015	Choi Young-hwan	Ode to My Father	국제시장
53	2016	Hong Kyung-pyo	The Wailing	곡성
54	2017	Park Jung-hoon	The Villainess	악녀
55	2018	Kim Ji-yong	The Fortress	남한산성
56	2019	Kim Young-ho	The Battle: Roar to Victory	봉오동 전투
57	2020	—N/a		
57	2021	—N/a		
58	2022	Ju Seong-rim	The Roundup	범죄도시2
59	2023	Choi Young-hwan	Smugglers	밀수

=== Best Editing ===
Best Editing
#	Year	Editor	Film (English)	Film (Korean)
36	1999	Park Gok-ji	Shiri	쉬리
37	2000	Ko Im-pyo	Phantom: The Submarine	유령
38	2001	Park Soon-deok	Libera Me	리베라 메
39	2002	Kim Hyeon	Musa	무사
40	2003	Park Gok-ji	Champion	챔피언
41	2004	Kim Sang-bum	Oldboy	올드보이
42	2005	Nam Na-yeong	Crying Fist	주먹이 운다
43	2006	Kim Sang-bum	Murder, Take One	사생결단
44	2007	Kim Sun-min	The Host	괴물
45	2008	Shin Min-kyung	Seven Days	세븐 데이즈
46	2009	Kim Hyeon	The Divine Weapon	신기전
47	2010	Kim Sang-bum, Kim Jae-bum	The Man from Nowhere	아저씨
48	2011	Nam Na-yeong	Sunny	써니
49	2012	Nam Na-yeong	Masquerade	광해: 왕이 된 남자
50	2013	Steve M. Choe, Kim Chang-ju	Snowpiercer	설국열차
51	2014	Shin Min-kyung	The Divine Move	신의 한 수
52	2015	Lee Jin	Ode to My Father	국제시장
53	2016	Kim Sun-min	The Wailing	곡성
54	2017	Sin Min-kyeong	The King	더 킹
55	2018	Kim Hyung-joo, Yang Dong-yeop	Gonjiam: Haunted Asylum	곤지암
56	2019	Lee Gang-hui	Exit	엑시트
57	2020	—N/a		
57	2021	—N/a		
58	2022	Kim Seon-min	The Roundup	범죄도시2
59	2023	Kim Sun-min	The Night Owl	올빼미

=== Best Art Direction ===
Best Art Direction
#	Year	Art Director	Film (English)	Film (Korean)
36	1999	MBC Art Center	Spring in My Hometown	아름다운 시절
37	2000	Min Eon-ok	Chunhyang	춘향뎐
38	2001	Kim Sang-man	Joint Security Area	공동경비구역 JSA
39	2002	Oh Sang-man	The Last Witness	흑수선
41	2004	Shin Bo-kyeong, Kang Chang-gil, Kang Bo-kil	Taegukgi	태극기 휘날리며
42	2005	Min Eon-ok	Blood Rain	혈의 누
43	2006	Cho Geun-hyun, Lee Hyeong-ju	Duelist	형사
44	2007	Kim Ki-chul	The Restless	중천
45	2008	Yoon Sang-yoon, Yoo Joo-ho	M	엠
46	2009	Kim Ki-chul	A Frozen Flower	쌍화점
47	2010	Jo Sung-won, Lee Tae-hoon	Moss	이끼
48	2011	Chae Kyung-sun	Detective K: Secret of the Virtuous Widow	조선명탐정: 각시투구꽃의 비밀
49	2012	Oh Heung-seok	Masquerade	광해: 왕이 된 남자
50	2013	Ondrej Nekvasil	Snowpiercer	설국열차
51	2014	Cho Hwa-sung	The Fatal Encounter	역린
52	2015	Chae Kyung-sun	The Royal Tailor	상의원
53	2016	Jo Hwa-sung	The Age of Shadows	밀정
54	2017	Lee Jae-seong	Anarchist from Colony	박열
55	2018	Park Il-hyun	The Spy Gone North	공작
56	2019	Seo Seong-kyeong	Svaha: The Sixth Finger	사바하
57	2020	—N/a		
57	2021	—N/a		
58	2022	Ryu Seong-hui, Lee Ha-jun	Alienoid	외계+인 1부
59	2023	Cho Hwa-sung, Choi Hyun-seouk	Concrete Utopia	콘크리트 유토피아

=== Best Lighting ===
Best Lighting
#	Year	Lighting Designer	Film (English)	Film (Korean)
36	1999	Won Myeong-jun	Shiri	쉬리
37	2000	Seo Jeong-dal	Phantom: The Submarine	유령
38	2001	Shin Joon-ha	Libera Me	리베라 메
39	2002	Lee Seung-gu	The Last Witness	흑수선
40	2003	Lee Gang-san	Memories of Murder	살인의 추억
41	2004	Park Hyun-won	Oldboy	올드보이
42	2005	Im Jae-young	Hypnotized	얼굴없는 미녀
43	2006	Yoo Young-jong	Typhoon	태풍
44	2007	Lee Joo-saeng	Paradise Murdered	극락도 살인사건
45	2008	Park Se-mun	Shadows in the Palace	궁녀
46	2009	Park Hyun-won	Thirst	박쥐
47	2010	Oh Seung-chul	I Saw the Devil	악마를 보았다
48	2011	Kim Min-jae	The Front Line	고지전
49	2012	Oh Seung-chul	Masquerade	광해: 왕이 된 남자
50	2013	Kim Sung-kwan	The Berlin File	베를린
51	2014	Kim Gyeong-seok	A Hard Day	끝까지 간다
52	2015	Kim Min-jae	The Silenced	경성학교: 사라진 소녀들
53	2016	Kim Chan-ho	The Wailing	곡성
54	2017	Kim Jae-geun	The Prison	프리즌
55	2018	Jo Kyu-young	The Fortress	남한산성
56	2019	Jeon Young-seok	Svaha: The Sixth Finger	사바하
57	2020	—N/a		
57	2021	—N/a		
58	2022	Lee Seong-hwan	Hunt	헌트8

=== Best Costume Design ===
Best Costume Design
#	Year	Costume Designer	Film (English)	Film (Korean)
36	1999	MBC Art Center	Spring in My Hometown	아름다운 시절
37	2000	Bong Hyun-sook	The Uprising	이재수의 난
38	2001	Kim Min-hee	Bichunmoo	비천무
39	2002	Huang Baorong	Musa	무사
40	2003	Im Seon-ok	Resurrection of the Little Match Girl	성냥팔이 소녀의 재림
41	2004	Jung Ku-ho, Kim Hee-ju	Untold Scandal	스캔들 – 조선 남녀 상열지사
42	2005	Jung Kyung-hee	Blood Rain	혈의 누
43	2006	Jung Kyung-hee	Forbidden Quest	음란서생
44	2007	Jo Sang-gyeong	Tazza: The High Rollers	타짜
45	2008	Jeong Jeong-eun	Hwang Jin-yi	황진이
46	2009	Kwon Yu-jin, Choi Ui-young	The Good, the Bad, the Weird	좋은 놈, 나쁜 놈, 이상한 놈
47	2010	Jung Kyung-hee	The Servant	방자전
48	2011	Chae Kyung-hwa	The Yellow Sea	황해
49	2012	Kwon Yu-jin, Im Seung-hee	Masquerade	광해: 왕이 된 남자
50	2013	Shim Hyun-sub	The Face Reader	관상
51	2014	Jo Sang-gyeong	Kundo: Age of the Rampant	군도: 민란의 시대
52	2015	Jo Sang-gyeong	The Royal Tailor	상의원
53	2016	Kwon Yoo-jin, Im Seung-hee	The Last Princess	덕혜옹주
54	2017	Sim Hyeon-seob	Anarchist from Colony	박열
55	2018	Jo Sang-gyeong	Illang: The Wolf Brigade	인랑
56	2019	Lee Jin-hee	The Great Battle	안시성
57	2020	—N/a		
57	2021	—N/a		
58	2022	Kwon Yoo-jin, Lim Seung-hee	Hansan: Rising Dragon	한산: 용의 출현
59	2023	Yoon Jung-hee	Killing Romance	킬링 로맨스

=== Best Music ===
Best Music
#	Year	Composer	Film (English)	Film (Korean)
36	1999	Won Il	Spring in My Hometown	아름다운 시절
37	2000	Won Il	The Uprising	이재수의 난
38	2001	Hwang Sang-jun	The Legend of Gingko	단적비연수
39	2002	Michael Staudacher	Indian Summer	인디언 썸머
40	2003	Lee Han-na	Road Movie	로드무비
41	2004	Jo Yeong-wook	Oldboy	올드보이
42	2005	Kim Jun-seong	Marathon	말아톤
43	2006	Michael Staudacher	Blue Swallow	청연
44	2007	Lee Jae-hak	200 Pounds Beauty	미녀는 괴로워
45	2008	Won Il	Hwang Jin-yi	황진이
46	2009	Kim Jun-seok	A Frozen Flower	쌍화점
47	2010	Kim Jun-seok	A Barefoot Dream	맨발의 꿈
48	2011	Jo Seong-woo, Choi Yong-rak	Late Autumn	만추
49	2012	Mowg, Kim Jun-seong	Masquerade	광해: 왕이 된 남자
50	2013	Jo Yeong-wook	New World	신세계
51	2014	Mowg	Miss Granny	수상한 그녀
52	2015	Kim Jun-seong	The Tenor – Lirico Spinto	더 테너 – 리리코 스핀토
53	2016	Choi Yong-rak, Jo Sung-woo	The Last Princess	덕혜옹주
54	2017	Dalparan	Vanishing Time: A Boy Who Returned	가려진 시간
55	2018	Ryuichi Sakamoto	The Fortress	남한산성
56	2019	Jung Jae-il	Parasite	기생충
57	2020	—N/a		
57	2021	—N/a		
58	2022	Kim Joon-seok	Life Is Beautiful	인생은 아름다워
59	2023	Dalpalan	Phantom	유령

=== Best Visual Effects ===
Best Visual Effects
#	Year	Visual Effects Supervisor	Film (English)	Film (Korean)
37	2000	Yu Dong-ryeol	Phantom: The Submarine	유령
39	2002	Jang Seong-ho	2009 Lost Memories	2009 로스트메모리즈
40	2003	Cha Soo-min, Hwang Hyeon-gyu, Kim Byung-ki	Resurrection of the Little Match Girl	성냥팔이 소녀의 재림
41	2004	Moon Byeong-yong, Shin Jae-ho, Jeong Do-an	Natural City	내츄럴 시티
42	2005	Jung Deok-young (B.BOX), Yoon Yeo-jin (KMFX)	Hypnotized	얼굴없는 미녀
43	2006	Kang Jong-ik	Typhoon	태풍
44	2007	DTI, ETRI, Shin Jae-ho, Jeong Do-an	The Restless	중천
45	2008	Younggu Art Studios	D-War	디워
46	2009	Jeong Seong-jin	Take Off	국가대표
47	2010	Kim Tae-ui	The Man from Nowhere	아저씨
48	2011	Han Young-woo	War of the Arrows	최종병기 활
49	2012	Jung Jae-hoon	Masquerade	광해: 왕이 된 남자
52	2015	Han Tae-jeong, Son Seung-hyeon, Kim Dae-jun, Kim Jeong-su, Akira Kai	Ode to My Father	국제시장
58	2022	Je Gal-seung	Alienoid	외계+인 1부
59	2023	Eun Jae-hyun	Concrete Utopia	콘크리트 유토피아

=== Best Sound Effects ===
Best Sound Effects
#	Year	Sound Designer	Film (English)	Film (Korean)
36	1999	Lee Byung-ha, Kim Suk-won	Shiri	쉬리
37	2000	Kim Suk-won	Phantom: The Submarine	유령
38	2001	Kim Won-yong, Kim Suk-won	Joint Security Area	공동경비구역 JSA
39	2002	Lee Gyu-seok, Ahn Sang-ho	2009 Lost Memories	2009 로스트메모리즈
40	2003	Lee Ji-soo, Choi Tae-young	Save the Green Planet!	지구를 지켜라!
41	2004	Lee Tae-gyu, Kim Suk-won	Taegukgi	태극기 휘날리며
42	2005	Kang Joo-seok	R-Point	알 포인트
43	2006	Eun Hee-soo	Blue Swallow	청연
44	2007	Jung Kwang-ho, Choi Tae-young	Lump Sugar	각설탕
45	2008	Lee Seung-chul, Lee Eun-ju	Seven Days	세븐 데이즈
46	2009	Oh Se-jin	The Divine Weapon	신기전
47	2010	Oh Se-jin, Kim Suk-won	Moss	이끼
48	2011	Choi Tae-young	War of the Arrows	최종병기 활
49	2012	Lee Sang-joon	Masquerade	광해: 왕이 된 남자
52	2015	Lee Seung-cheol, Han Myung-hwan	Ode to My Father	국제시장
59	2023	Kim Suk-won	Concrete Utopia	콘크리트 유토피아

=== Technical Award ===
Technical Award
#	Year	Recipient	Film (English)	Film (Korean)
50	2013	Digital Idea	The Tower	타워
51	2014	Kang Tae-gyun, Yun Dae-won	The Admiral: Roaring Currents	명량
54	2017		The Villainess	악녀
55	2018	Jin Jong-hyun	Along with the Gods: The Last 49 Days	신과함께–인과 연
56	2019	Andras Ikladi	Ashfall	백두산

=== Best Planning ===
Best Planning
#	Year	Producer	Film (English)	Film (Korean)
36	1999	Kang Je-gyu	Shiri	쉬리
37	2000	Lee Kwan-soo	Attack the Gas Station	주유소 습격사건
38	2001	Lee Mi-young	Interview	인터뷰
39	2002	Hwang Woo-hyun, Hwang Jae-woo	The Way Home	집으로
40	2003	Kim Mi-hee	My Teacher, Mr. Kim	선생 김봉두
41	2004	Jonathan Kim	Silmido	실미도
42	2005	Seok Myeong-hong	Marathon	말아톤
43	2006	Oh Jeong-wan	You Are My Sunshine	너는 내 운명
44	2007	Lee Jeong-hak	Lump Sugar	각설탕
45	2008	Kim Su-jin, Yun In-beom	The Chaser	추격자
46	2009	Yoon Je-kyoon	Tidal Wave	해운대
47	2010	Kim Joon-jong	A Barefoot Dream	맨발의 꿈
48	2011	Lee Woo-jeong	The Front Line	고지전
49	2012	Im Sang-jin	Masquerade	광해: 왕이 된 남자
50	2013	Kim Min-ki, Lee Sang-hun	Miracle in Cell No. 7	7번방의 선물
51	2014	Kim Han-min	The Admiral: Roaring Currents	명량
52	2015		Ode to My Father	국제시장
53	2016	Kim Won-guk	Inside Men	내부자들
54	2017		A Taxi Driver	택시운전사
55	2018	Lee Woo-jung	1987: When the Day Comes	1987
56	2019	Lee Jong-suk	Extreme Job	극한직업

=== Special Jury Prize ===
Special Jury Prize
#	Year	Recipient	Film (English)	Film (Korean)
36	1999	Uno Films	Christmas in August	8월의 크리스마스
37	2000	Taeheung Films	Chunhyang	춘향뎐
38	2001	Koo & Film	A Day	하루
39	2002	Tube Pictures	Failan	파이란
41	2004	Plenus/Cinema Service	Silmido	실미도
46	2009	Moon Ja-young	Mommy, Kitty & Me	엄마를 기다리며
49	2012	Kim Ki-duk	Pietà	피에타
50	2013	Kal So-won	Miracle in Cell No. 7	7번방의 선물

=== Best Short Film ===
Best Short Film
#	Year	Film (English)	Film (Korean)	Director
36	1999	Crack of the Halo	햇빛 자르는 아이	Kim Jin-han
36	1999	Liver and Potato	간과 감자	Song Il-gon
37	2000	28th October 1979, A Sunny Sunday	1979년 10월28일 맑음	Kwon Jong-kwan
37	2000	The Picnic	소풍	Song Il-gon
38	2001	Uncle 'Bar' at Barbershop	이발소 異氏	Kwon Jong-kwan
46	2009	Last Homecoming	마지막 귀갓길	Kim Joon-sung
46	2009	Goodbye	굿바이	Kang Dong-heon
49	2012	The Woman	여자	Choi Ji-yeon
50	2013	Adultery	불륜	Kim Joon-sung

=== Popularity Award ===
Popularity Award
#	Year	Recipient	Film (English)	Film (Korean)
36	1999	Han Suk-kyu	Christmas in August	8월의 크리스마스
36	1999	Shim Eun-ha	Christmas in August	8월의 크리스마스
37	2000	Han Suk-kyu	Tell Me Something	텔 미 썸딩
37	2000	Shim Eun-ha	Tell Me Something	텔 미 썸딩
38	2001	Lee Byung-hun	Joint Security Area	공동경비구역 JSA
38	2001	Shim Eun-ha	Interview	인터뷰
39	2002	Cha Tae-hyun	My Sassy Girl	엽기적인 그녀
39	2002	Jun Ji-hyun	My Sassy Girl	엽기적인 그녀
41	2004	Kwon Sang-woo	Once Upon a Time in High School	말죽거리 잔혹사
41	2004	Moon Geun-young	My Little Bride	어린 신부
42	2005	Cho Seung-woo	Marathon	말아톤
42	2005	Moon Geun-young	Innocent Steps	댄서의 순정
43	2006	Lee Joon-gi	King and the Clown	왕의 남자
43	2006	Kang Sung-yeon	King and the Clown	왕의 남자
43	2006	(Korean Wave) Lee Joon-gi	King and the Clown	왕의 남자
43	2006	(Korean Wave) Lee Young-ae	Sympathy for Lady Vengeance	친절한 금자씨
44	2007	Lee Beom-soo		
44	2007	Kim Ah-joong	200 Pounds Beauty	미녀는 괴로워
44	2007	(Korean Wave) Jung Ji-hoon	I'm a Cyborg, But That's OK	싸이보그지만 괜찮아
44	2007	(Korean Wave) Kim Tae-hee	The Restless	중천
45	2008	Kim Yoon-seok	The Chaser	추격자
45	2008	Han Ye-seul	Miss Gold Digger	용의주도 미스신
45	2008	(Korean Wave) Cha Tae-hyun	BA:BO	바보
46	2009	Kim Myung-min	Closer to Heaven	내 사랑 내 곁에
46	2009	Park Bo-young	Scandal Makers	과속스캔들
47	2010	Won Bin	The Man from Nowhere	아저씨
47	2010	Lee Min-jung	Cyrano Agency	시라노;연애조작단
47	2010	(Korean Wave) Choi Seung-hyun	71: Into the Fire	포화 속으로
48	2011	Won Bin		
49	2012	Lee Byung-hun	Masquerade	광해: 왕이 된 남자
50	2013	Lee Jung-jae	The Face Reader	관상
51	2014	Yim Si-wan	The Attorney	변호인
51	2014	Kim Woo-bin	Friend: The Great Legacy	친구 2
51	2014	Lee Ha-nee	Tazza: The Hidden Card	타짜: 신의 손
52	2015	Kim Soo-hyun		
52	2015	Gong Hyo-jin		
53	2016	Lee Beom-soo	Operation Chromite	인천상륙작전
55	2018	Kim Seol-hyun		
58	2022	Oh Na-ra	Perhaps Love	장르만 로맨스
58	2022	Park Ji-hwan	The Roundup	범죄도시2

=== Lifetime Achievement Award ===
Lifetime Achievement Award for the Advancement of Cinema
#	Year	Recipient	Notes
36	1999	Choi Moo-ryong	Actor
37	2000	Kim Ji-mee	Actress
39	2002	Lee Kyung-soon	
42	2005	Yu Hyun-mok	Director
43	2006	Lee Kyung-ja	
44	2007	Shin Young-kyun	Actor
45	2008	Yoo Dong-hun	Screenwriter
46	2009	Kang Dae-seon	Screenwriter
47	2010	Choi Eun-hee	Actress
48	2011	Lee Dae-geun	Actor
49	2012	Kwak Jeong-hwan	Producer
49	2012	Ko Eun-ah	Actress
50	2013	Hwang Jeong-sun	Actress
50	2013	Jung Il-sung	
51	2014	Jung Jin-woo	Director
52	2015	Jeong Chang-hwa	Director
52	2015	Yoon Il-bong	Actor
53	2016	Yoon Sam-yook	Director
58	2022	Ahn Sung-ki	Actor
59	2023	Jang Mi-hee	Actress

=== Various Awards ===
Various Awards
#	Year	Award	Recipient	Film (English)	Film (Korean)
36	1999	Best Newcomer in Cinematography	Kim Young-chul	The Power of Kangwon Province	강원도의 힘
36	1999	Special Mention	Kim Tae-wook	—N/a	
36	1999	Special Mention	Han Kwang-dong	—N/a	
36	1999	Special Mention	Chu Bong, Sung Moung-sun	—N/a	
37	2000	Best Newcomer in Cinematography	Moon Yong-sik	The Great Chef	북경반점
38	2001	Best Documentary	Kye Woon-jung	Pansy & Ivy	팬지와 담쟁이
39	2002	Special Acting Award	Kim Ki-jong	—N/a	
39	2002	Special Acting Award	Jung Mi-kyung	—N/a	
39	2002	Special Technical Award	Lee Jong-hyeong	—N/a	
39	2002	Best Newcomer in Technical	Song Jae-seok	Guns & Talks	킬러들의 수다
41	2004	Best Dressed	Lee Mi-yeon	—N/a	
43	2006	50 Years Since Debut Memorial Award	Ahn Sung-ki	—N/a	
44	2007	Special Award	Jeon Do-yeon	—N/a	
46	2009	Participation Award	Yang Jun-ho	Meet Parents	상견계하는 날
46	2009	Participation Award	Lee Eun-chun	Solo	솔로
47	2010	Proud Filmmaker Award	Shin Young-kyun	—N/a	
47	2010	Special Award for Foreign Film	Abdulhamid Juma	—N/a	
49	2012	Special Acting Award	Jung Ji-hee	—N/a	
49	2012	Photogenic Award at Opening Ceremony	Min Hyo-rin	—N/a	
52	2015	Best Foreign Actor	Sun Honglei	—N/a	
52	2015	Best Foreign Actor	Gao Yuanyuan	—N/a	
55	2018	Special Award	Kim Young-ae	—N/a	
55	2018	Special Award	Kim Joo-hyuk	—N/a	

== See also ==
- Cinema of Korea
- List of film awards
