= Public Enemy (2002 film) =

- Hangul: 공공의 적
- Hanja: 公共의 敵
- RR: Gonggongui jeok
- MR: Konggongŭi chŏk
- Directed by: Kang Woo-suk
- Written by: Baek Seung-jae; Jung Yoon-seup; Kim Hyun-jung; Chae Yoon-suk
- Produced by: Kang Woo-suk
- Starring: Sul Kyung-gu; Lee Sung-jae
- Cinematography: Kim Sung-bog
- Edited by: Ko Im-pyo
- Music by: Cho Young-wuk
- Production company: Kang Woo-suk Productions
- Distributed by: Cinema Service
- Release date: January 25, 2002 (South Korea)
- Running time: 135 minutes
- Country: South Korea
- Language: Korean
- Box office: $15,897,574

Public Enemy (Korean: 공공의 적) is a 2002 South Korean neo-noir action thriller film directed by Kang Woo-suk. The film was well received by audiences and critics alike, being seen by almost 3 million people in South Korea, while winning Sul Kyung-gu Best Actor at the Grand Bell Awards and Blue Dragon Film Awards for his lead role. The success of the film led to the making of the sequel Another Public Enemy in 2005.

== Plot ==
The film's plot pits a tough loose-cannon cop, Kang Chul-joong, and a psychopathic killer, Cho Kyu-hwan, against each other. Kang typifies the anti-hero cop genre, taking bribes and stealing drugs from criminals. His career is in a slump and internal affairs are investigating his actions. The antagonist Cho, on the other hand, leads a life as a successful business and family man. Under his cool exterior however, he displays a total disregard for others, killing people for the slightest perceived misdeed.

The two main characters first meet by chance in a dark alley shortly after Cho brutally murders his parents for monetary reasons. Cho first asked then started begging to get his parents to leave their will to him. After his parents refuse, Cho gets a knife and stabs them both dozens of times. He sprays flour all around their body and washes the excess blood by taking a shower. Then he starts walking to get rid of the murder weapon. Kang is defecating in the dark alley during an unrelated stakeout and runs into Cho, who ends up slashing Kang in the face with a knife.

Kang later joins the investigation into the murders, but doesn't recognize Cho as he didn't get a good look at his face. His instincts tell him that something is wrong about Cho, and Kang starts stalking him. Kang soon convinces himself that Cho is the murderer, although no one else believes that he has a case. He is eventually fired from the police force and becomes a traffic cop.

Eventually, Kang discovers a crucial piece of evidence, a broken fingernail, at the murder scene and confronts Cho with it. This leads to the two facing off against each other in a fight, which ends with Kang beating Cho to death. Kang is restored to the force, and at the end his internal affairs tail reports that he "is getting better."

== Cast ==
- Sul Kyung-gu ... Kang Chul-joong
- Lee Sung-jae ... Cho Kyu-hwan
- Kang Shin-il ... Chief Investigator Uhm
- Kim Jeong-hak ... Detective Kim
- Do Yong-gu ... Detective Nam

== Awards and nominations ==
2002 Chunsa Film Art Awards

- Best Supporting Actor - Kang Shin-il

2002 Baeksang Arts Awards

- Jury Prize

2002 Grand Bell Awards

- Best Actor - Sul Kyung-gu

2002 Blue Dragon Film Awards

- Best Actor - Sul Kyung-gu
