= Art Museum by the Zoo =

- Theatrical poster
- Directed by: Lee Jeong-hyang
- Written by: Lee Jeong-hyang
- Produced by: Lee Choon-yeon
- Starring: Shim Eun-ha; Lee Sung-jae
- Cinematography: Jo Yong-gyu
- Edited by: Kim Sang-bum
- Music by: Kim Yang-hui
- Distributed by: Cinema Service
- Release date: December 19, 1998
- Running time: 108 minutes
- Country: South Korea
- Language: Korean

Art Museum by the Zoo (Korean: 미술관 옆 동물원; RR: Misulgwan yeop dongmurwon) is a 1998 South Korean romance film written and directed by Lee Jeong-hyang.

== Plot ==
On leave from the military, Cheol-soo arrives at his girlfriend's apartment only to find it occupied by another woman, Choon-hee. After a few days he finds out that his girlfriend is now engaged to someone else, and having nowhere else to go he ends up staying with Choon-hee. At first the two struggle to get along, but before long Chul-soo discovers that she is writing a screenplay to enter into a competition, and they end up working on a story together based on their own experiences of love, titling it "Art Museum by the Zoo."

== Cast ==
- Shim Eun-ha ... Choon-hee
- Lee Sung-jae ... Cheol-soo
- Ahn Sung-ki ... In-gong
- Song Seon-mi ... Da-hye

== Reception ==
Art Museum by the Zoo was released in South Korea on December 19, 1998, drawing a then-impressive 412,472 viewers in Seoul alone, making it the fifth best-selling Korean film of 1998.

In 1999, Shim Eun-ha won Best Actress at the Grand Bell Awards, and Lee Sung-jae swept Best New Actor awards at the Baeksang Arts Awards, the Chunsa Film Art Awards, the Grand Bell Awards and the Blue Dragon Film Awards.

Director Lee Jeong-hyang was praised for her sophisticated and detailed direction, and the film is now considered a classic of 1990s Korean cinema.

In 2025, the film was selected by South Korean film director and screenwriter Yoon Ga-eun for the section 'Our Little History, Please Take Care of Our Future!' at the 30th Busan International Film Festival, recognized as a work that had a profound influence on her creative journey.
