= Ice Rain (film) =

- Theatrical release poster
- Directed by: Kim Eun-sook
- Written by: Park Mi-young; Seo Ji-yeong; Kim Eun-sook
- Produced by: Ku Bon-han
- Starring: Lee Sung-jae; Kim Ha-neul; Song Seung-heon
- Cinematography: Yoon Hong-sik
- Edited by: Kim Sang-bum; Kim Jae-bum
- Music by: Choi Seung-hyun
- Production company: Sanrio Film Pictures Inc.
- Distributed by: Showbox
- Release date: January 16, 2004
- Running time: 104 minutes
- Country: South Korea
- Language: Korean

Ice Rain (Korean: 빙우; RR: Bingu) is a 2004 South Korean romantic drama film starring Lee Sung-jae, Kim Ha-neul, and Song Seung-heon. Co-written and directed by first-time director Kim Eun-sook, it tells the story of two mountaineers stranded on a climb to Mount Asiaq in Alaska. While waiting out the storm, they share stories of the women that changed their lives, not knowing how closely connected they actually are.

== Cast ==
- Lee Sung-jae as Kang Joong-hyun
- Kim Ha-neul as Kim Kyung-min
- Song Seung-heon as Han Woo-sung
- Yoo Hae-jin as Park In-soo
- Kim Jung-hak as Choi Keun-ho
- Lee Chun-hee as Choi Byung-hoon
- Kim Jin-yi as Kwon Sang-hee
- Lee Seung-joon
