= Hanbando (film) =

- Theatrical release poster
- Hangul: 한반도
- Hanja: 韓半島
- RR: Hanbando
- MR: Hanbando
- Directed by: Kang Woo-suk
- Written by: Kim Hie-jae; Lee Hyo-cheol
- Starring: Cho Jae-hyun; Cha In-pyo; Ahn Sung-ki; Moon Sung-keun; Kang Shin-il
- Cinematography: Choi Young-taek
- Edited by: Ko Im-pyo
- Music by: Han Jae-kwon
- Distributed by: Cinema Service
- Release date: July 13, 2006 (South Korea)
- Running time: 147 minutes
- Country: South Korea
- Language: Korean
- Box office: US$18.5 million

Hanbando (Korean: 한반도; lit. 'Peninsula') is a 2006 South Korean mystery thriller drama film directed by Kang Woo-suk. It features an ensemble cast led by Cho Jae-hyun, Cha In-pyo, Ahn Sung-ki, Moon Sung-keun, and Kang Shin-il. The film depicts efforts by South and North Korea to improve relations, while confronting interference from neighboring countries that are opposed to Korean reunification.

== Plot ==
The North and South Korean governments are on the verge of reopening the Kyungui Railroad, which connects the two Koreas, as a further step toward reunification. Japan refuses to accept the decision, claiming rights to the railway lines based on official documents imprinted with the imperial seal of Emperor Gojong of Joseon a century ago. Yet an age old conspiracy is uncovered where the imperial seal with which Emperor Gojong signed the documents is suspected to be fake. It is a race against time and hidden agendas as the South Korean president (Ahn Sung-ki) employs the outspoken historian Choi Min-jae (Cho Jae-hyun) and the descendant of the Joseon royal bloodline Kim Yu-shik (Kang Shin-il) to find the authentic seal and prevent the history of Japanese occupation from repeating itself. In the meantime, Japanese economic sanctions divide the South Korean government, and its armed forces appear on the border of South Korea threatening its sovereignty. Eventually, the authentic royal seal is found and Japan apologizes for its occupation.

== Cast ==
- Cho Jae-hyun as Choi Min-jae
- Cha In-pyo as Lee Sang-hyun
- Ahn Sung-ki as President of South Korea
- Moon Sung-keun as Gwon Yong-hwan
- Kang Shin-il as Kim Yu-shik
- Shim Wan-joon as Navy CIC soldier

== Reception ==
The JoongAng Ilbo gave the film a largely negative review, calling its plot far-fetched, the acting overdone, and criticizing its heavy-handed nationalism. The review commented positively on the accuracy of scenes in which the South Korean prime minister deals with businessmen, and on the "beautifully choreographed" though bloody depictions of historical events at the end of the Joseon period. According to the review, the conclusion of the film, in which Japan apologizes for its occupation of Korea, provides viewers with catharsis in a country in which anti-Japanese sentiment is still strong.
