= No Mercy (2010 film) =

2010 South Korean crime thriller film

- Theatrical release poster
- Hangul: 용서는 없다
- RR: Yongseoneun eopda
- MR: Yongsŏnŭn ŏpta
- Directed by: Kim Hyeong-jun
- Written by: Kim Hyeong-jun
- Produced by: Kang Woo-suk
- Starring: Sul Kyung-gu; Ryoo Seung-bum; Han Hye-jin
- Cinematography: Kim Woo-hyung
- Edited by: Kim Sun-min
- Music by: Park Ji-man
- Production companies: Cinema Service; The Dream&Pictures
- Distributed by: CJ Entertainment
- Release date: January 7, 2010
- Running time: 125 minutes
- Country: South Korea
- Language: Korean
- Box office: US$7.3 million

No Mercy (Korean: 용서는 없다; RR: Yongseoneun eopda) is a 2010 South Korean crime thriller film written and directed by Kim Hyeong-jun. Sul Kyung-gu won Best Actor at the 18th Chunsa Film Art Awards for his performance.

== Plot ==
Top forensic pathologist Kang Min-ho is about to retire so that he can spend time with his daughter who has just returned home after a long stint overseas. But when the dismembered corpse of a young woman, identified as Oh Eun-ah, is found at a local river, Kang agrees to do one last job. He performs a graphic autopsy on her.

The primary suspect is environmental activist Lee Sung-ho, who readily admits his guilt to rookie detective Min Seo-young, Kang's former student. Lee says that he committed the crime in order to oppose construction that would divide the river into six parts (hence the six body parts), but the police are baffled when the clues they uncover keep contradicting Lee's confession. Then Lee tells Kang that his daughter has been kidnapped. Lee lets Kang call his daughter, who hears her crying for help. Kang is forced to compromise his professional ethics and tamper with the evidence that must lead to Lee's release from custody within three days, or else Kang's daughter will be killed.

Exploring some backstory behind Lee, Min discovers that Kang was involved in another case, which was on three defendants who allegedly raped Lee's sister. Kang tampers the evidence for money for his sick daughter, showing that the sex was not forced and that the sister was promiscuous. She also learns that Oh Eun-ah was a witness. The three defendants were freed from charge, leaving Lee full of hatred towards Kang for lying at trial.

After Kang tampers with enough evidence (including completely dissecting the body of Oh Eun-ah and placing semen in it), Lee is released, and Kang follows him to his home. Min realizes the defendants are all dead and Kang will be next. After Kang viciously beats Lee about his daughter, Lee tells him her location.

When Kang, Lee, and Min arrive to the building Lee directed them to, they find his daughter dead in a pile of rose petals. Kang, devastated, tries to gather her body, but he finds that there is not a body; only her head and limbs are in the petals. Kang collapses in shock: The dismembered body, supposedly of "Oh Eun-ah" found at the beginning of the film, which Kang also autopsied throughout the film and tampered with, was actually his daughter, while the real Oh Eun-ah was a different hostage. His daughter's cries for help that Kang heard over the phone were actually recorded by Lee prior to her death. She was dead way before the start. Kang cries in agony as flashbacks show the graphic autopsy, where he continues to dissect his daughter's corpse and tampers with it by adding semen, completely unaware at the time.

Lee taunts Kang and brags that he will live with the same pain Lee did. Min begs Kang not to kill Lee for his daughter's death, but the doctor takes out her gun and shoots him. Kang, unable to forgive himself, also shoots himself as the police arrive. The film ends with a voiceover from Lee about how easy it is to hate and how hard it is to forgive.

== Cast ==
- Sul Kyung-gu as Kang Min-ho
- Ryoo Seung-bum as Lee Sung-ho
- Han Hye-jin as Min Seo-young
- Sung Ji-ru as Yoon Jong-kang
- Nam Kyung-eup as Team leader Oh
- Park Sang-wook as Park Pyung-sik
- Lee Jeong-heon as Analyst
- Lee Jeong-woo as Min Byung-do
- Jung Si-yeon as Ah-ri
- Jo Soo-jung as Oh Eun-ah
- Kim Yeol as Kang Hye-won
- Yoo Da-in as Lee Soo-jin
- Joo Sang-wook as Lee Sung-ho's defense lawyer
- Kim Jung-hak as Prosecutor Park
- Kim Hyeok as Male student in prologue
- Chae Yoon-seo as Female student in prologue

== Box office ==
It drew 1,125,154 admissions during its theatrical run, grossing US$7,584,729.
