= Lee Sung-jae =

South Korean actor (born 1970)

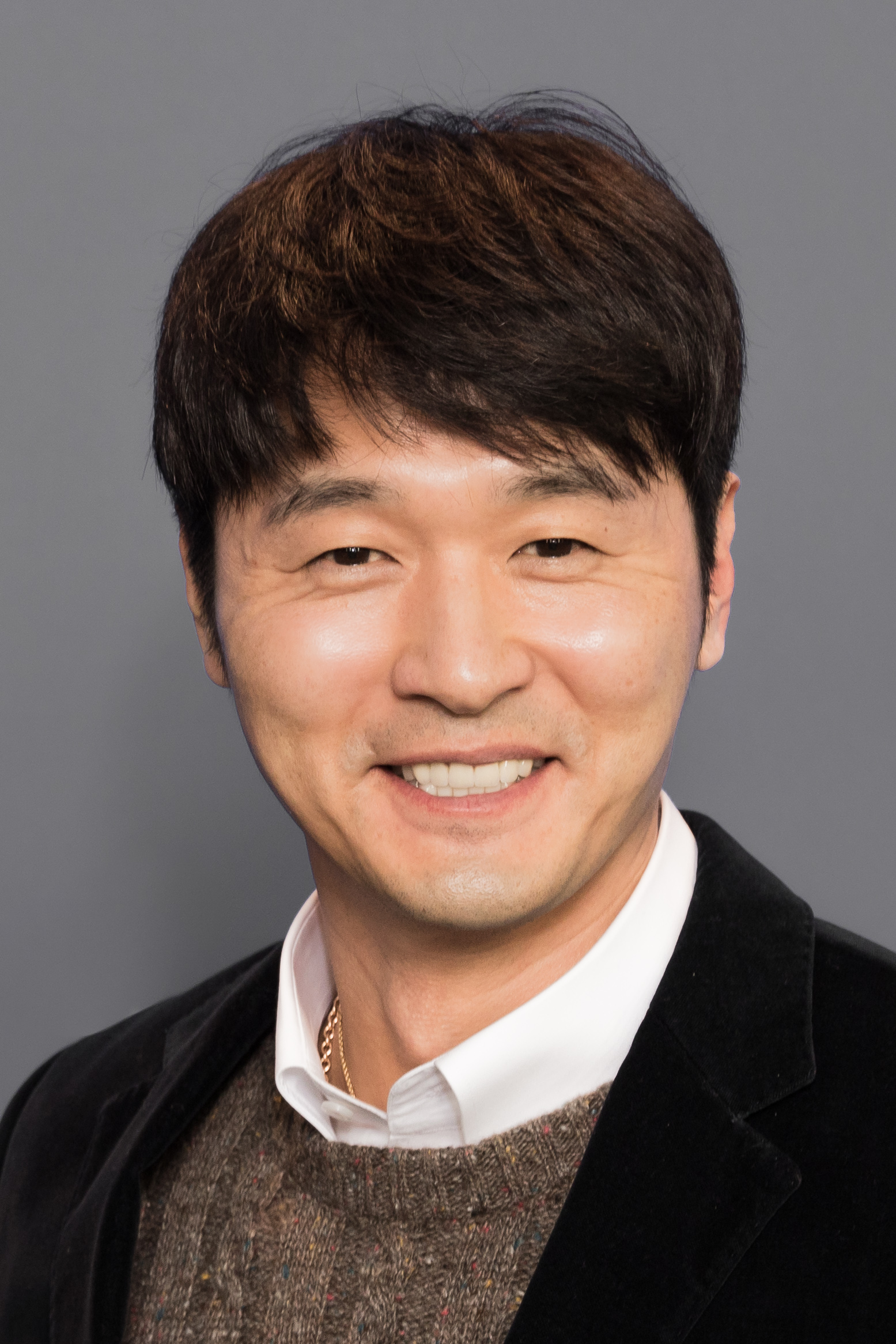
- Born: August 23, 1970 (age 56); Yongsan-gu, Seoul, South Korea
- Education: Dongguk University - Theater and Film
- Occupation: Actor
- Years active: 1995–present
- Agent: IOK Company
- Spouse: Kim Jin-sook (m. 1996)
- Children: 2

Korean name
- Hangul: 이성재
- Hanja: 李誠宰
- RR: I Seongjae
- MR: I Sŏngjae

Lee Sung-jae (Korean: 이성재; born August 23, 1970) is a South Korean actor. Among his notable works include the films Art Museum by the Zoo (1998), Attack the Gas Station (1999), Kick the Moon (2001), and Public Enemy (2002), as well as the television series Gu Family Book (2013).

== Career ==
Lee in a short period rose to become one of the more versatile and popular actors in Korean cinema. After working for a time on TV (his debut was the MBC drama The Love of Two Women), he launched his film career with the romantic comedy Art Museum by the Zoo opposite superstar Shim Eun-ha. The success of this movie gave him considerable attention and led to him being offered many more roles.

After starring in Ghost in Love opposite Kim Hee-sun, Lee rose to prominence as the leader of a small group of thugs in one of the biggest box-office hits of the late 1990s, Kim Sang-jin's smash comedy Attack the Gas Station. Shortly thereafter he took a role in a very different kind of film, the accomplished black comedy Barking Dogs Never Bite, and his portrayal of a dog-hating lecturer who desperately wants to become a professor received good reviews.

In 2001, Lee acted opposite Ko So-young in A Day, a drama about a young married couple who wish to have a baby; he then appeared alongside Cha Seung-won and Kim Hye-soo in Kick the Moon, another wildly popular comedy by Kim Sang-jin. Lee also had a memorable turn as the villain in Public Enemy, a hugely successful film by hit director and Cinema Service founder Kang Woo-suk.

In 2004, Lee portrayed a mountain climber in the big-budget adventure/melodrama Ice Rain, which was shot in the Canadian Rockies, then played a ballroom dancer in Dance with the Wind, Park Jung-woo's directorial debut (Park wrote the screenplay for many of Kim Sang-jin's films). Other notable roles include real-life fugitive Ji Kang-hun in 2006's Holiday, and a sculptor in 2010 3D erotic film Natalie.

Among the television series he's starred in include 2008 romantic comedy Lawyers of the Great Republic of Korea, and 2012 hit cable drama How Long I've Kissed.

== Filmography ==
=== Film ===
Year	Title	Role	Notes	Ref.
1998	Art Museum by the Zoo	Chul-su		
1999	Ghost in Love	Kantorates		
1999	Attack the Gas Station	No Mark		
2000	Barking Dogs Never Bite	Go Yoon-joo		
2001	A Day	Seok-yoon		
2001	Kick the Moon	Park Young-jun		
2002	Public Enemy	Jo Kyu-hwan		
2004	Ice Rain	Kang Joong-hyun		
2004	Dance with the Wind	Park Pung-shik		
2004	Shinsukki Blues	Shin Suk-ki		
2005	Holiday	Ji Kang-heon		
2006	Daisy	Jeong Woo		
2007	The Mafia, The Salesman	Gye Doo-Sik		
2010	Dreams Come True	1st Squad Leader		
2010	Natalie	Hwang Jun-Hyuk		
2011	Song of Dreams	U-Reuk		
2018	Human, Space, Time and Human	Politician		
2022	Carter	Kim Jong-hyuk	Netflix Film	

=== Television ===
Year	Title	Role	Notes
1995	The Love of Two Women		
1997	Yesterday	Yoon Min-soo	
1998	Beyond the Horizon		
1998	Lie	Suh Joon-hee	
2006	Stranger than Paradise	No Yoon-jae	
2008	Lawyers of the Great Republic of Korea	Han Min Gook	
2011	Poseidon	Kwon Jung-ryool	
2012	How Long I've Kissed	Kim Tae-oh	
2012	The Sons	Yoo Hyun-ki	
2013	Gu Family Book	Jo Gwan-woong	
2013	The Suspicious Housekeeper	Eun Sang-chul	
2014	The King's Face	King Seonjo	
2015	Warm and Cozy	Song Jung-geun	
2016	Secret Healer	Choi Hyun-seo	
2016	Don't Dare to Dream	Kim Rak	
2018	Goodbye to Goodbye	Han Sang-jin	
2019	Abyss	Oh Yeong-cheol	
2019	Diary of a Prosecutor	Jo Min-ho	
2021–2022	Show Window: The Queen's House	Shin Myung-seob	
2022–2023	Red Balloon	Ji Nam-cheol	
2025	The Art of Negotiation		

=== Variety shows ===
Year	Title	Role	Notes
2013	I Live Alone	Cast member	Ep. 1-37
2015	Law of the Jungle in Indochina	Cast member	
2016	Flower Crew	Cast member	

== Awards ==
Year	Award ceremony	Category	Nominee(s) / Work(s)	Result
1999	35th Baeksang Arts Award	Best New Actor	Art Museum by the Zoo	Won
1999	19th Korean Association of Film Critics Award	Best New Actor	Art Museum by the Zoo	Won
1999	7th Chunsa Film Art Awards	Best New Actor	Art Museum by the Zoo	Won
1999	36th Grand Bell Awards	Best New Actor	Art Museum by the Zoo	Won
1999	20th Blue Dragon Film Awards	Best New Actor	Art Museum by the Zoo	Won
2000	36th Baeksang Arts Awards	Popularity Award	Attack the Gas Station	Won
