= Kick the Moon =

2001 film by Kim Sang-jin

- Theatrical release poster
- Hangul: 신라의 달밤
- Hanja: 新羅의 달밤
- RR: Sillaui dalbam
- MR: Sillaŭi talpam
- Directed by: Kim Sang-jin
- Written by: Park Jung-woo
- Produced by: Kim Sang-jin; Kim Mi-hee
- Starring: Lee Sung-jae; Cha Seung-won; Kim Hye-soo
- Cinematography: Jeong Kwang-seok
- Edited by: Ko Im-pyo
- Music by: Son Mu-hyeon
- Distributed by: Cinema Service
- Release date: June 23, 2001
- Running time: 118 minutes
- Country: South Korea
- Language: Korean

Kick the Moon (Korean: 신라의 달밤) is a 2001 South Korean comedy-drama film directed by Kim Sang-jin.

== Plot ==
Ten years ago, a legendary fighter named Choi Gi-dong and a timid straight-A student named Park Young-joon leave for a high school field trip to Gyeongju. But during their journey, fate befalls on them as they experience an unforgettable incident that would change the course of their lives.

One night during a school gala, Gi-dong leads his entire school to a huge brawl against a local gang while Young-joon chickens out and stays behind at the party by himself. The streets turn out to be a battlefield with blood gushing, heads bashing and bones breaking, but the gruesome fight nonetheless becomes history in the making. Gi-dong becomes admired for his bravery, while Young-joon gets ostracized for his fear.

Ten years later, Gi-dong and Young-joon coincidentally meet each other at a club in Gyeongju. Surprisingly, Young-joon turns out to be a big time gangster while Gi-dong becomes a daunting phys ed teacher who transferred to a high school in Gyeongju. They feel glad about their unexpected reunion, but the mood gets tense as they rekindle old yet not-so-fond memories.

Before they bid farewell, both Gi-dong and Young-joon suddenly find a pretty damsel named Ju-ran in distress. In an instant, they fall headlong in love with her as Ju-ran's gleeful smile sweeps them off their feet.

Gi-dong makes his claim on Ju-ran, but Young-joon calls it a fair game. Young-joon planned to make his trip to Gyeongju a short visit, but he extends his stay to win Ju-ran's heart and to get back at Gi-dong for old time's sake. Gi-dong gets infuriated over Young-joon's decision since he won't listen to him like the good old days. Even though fighting over Ju-ran becomes a grueling test to their friendship, the situation gets worse when they practically get the whole city involved. It's a fight to the finish to win one girl's heart, even if it takes a few bones to break.

== Cast ==
- Lee Sung-jae - Park Young-jun
- Cha Seung-won - Choi Gi-dong
- Kim Hye-soo - Min Ju-ran
- Lee Jong-su - Min Jin-seob
- Kim Young-joon - Park Jun-young
- Lee Han-gal - Hyeok-su
- Lee Won-jong - Chun-soo
- Yoo Hae-jin
- Lee Si-eon
