= Phantom: The Submarine =

- Film poster
- Hangul: 유령
- RR: yuryeong
- MR: yuryŏng
- Directed by: Min Byung-chun
- Written by: Bong Joon-ho; Jang Joon-hwan; Kim Jong-hoon; Koo Seon-ju; Min Byung-chun
- Produced by: Cha Seung-jae; Kim Seon-a; Im Hee-cheol; Kang Cheol-gyu; Lee Hwan-hee
- Starring: Choi Min-soo; Jung Woo-sung; Yoon Joo-sang
- Cinematography: Hong Kyung-pyo
- Edited by: Ko Im-pyo
- Music by: Lee Dong-jun
- Production company: Highmark
- Distributed by: Uno Film
- Release date: July 31, 1999
- Running time: 103 minutes
- Country: South Korea
- Language: Korean

Phantom: The Submarine (Korean: 유령, lit. 'Ghost') is a 1999 South Korean submarine thriller film directed by Min Byung-chun.

== Plot ==
South Korea's first nuclear-powered submarine, Phantom, is sent on a life-or-death reconnaissance mission off the coast of Japan.

== Cast ==
- Choi Min-soo as 202
- Jung Woo-sung as 431 (Lee Chan-seok)
- Yoon Joo-sang as Captain

== Production ==
Cinematographer Hong Kyung-pyo utilized a "dry-for-wet" technique to achieve underwater visuals without actual water, similar to methods used in Hollywood films such as Crimson Tide. For a 25-minute submarine combat sequence, Hong maintained dense smog on a 400-square-meter set for 36 days, using approximately 200 liters of oil-based smog. To simulate an underwater environment, he continuously adjusted smog concentration, filters, and lighting while sealing the set throughout the winter. Although considered safe, the conditions required the crew to wear gas masks. Initially, crew members expressed concern that the footage resembled toys in a blurry fog rather than a deep-sea environment.

== Awards and nominations ==
Award	Year	Category	Nominated work	Result	Ref.
Cine21 Film Awards	1999	Cinematographer of the Year	Hong Kyung-pyo	Won	
