= The Way Home (2002 film) =

- South Korean theatrical release poster
- Hangul: 집으로
- RR: Jibeuro
- MR: Chibŭro
- Directed by: Lee Jeong-hyang
- Written by: Lee Jeong-hyang
- Produced by: Hwang Woo-hyun; Hwang Jae-woo
- Starring: Kim Eul-boon; Yoo Seung-ho
- Cinematography: Yoon Heung-sik
- Edited by: Kim Jae-bum; Kim Sang-bum
- Music by: Kim Dae-heung; Kim Yang-hee
- Production company: Tube Entertainment
- Distributed by: CJ Entertainment
- Release date: April 5, 2002
- Running time: 87 minutes
- Country: South Korea
- Language: Korean
- Box office: $25 million

The Way Home (Korean: 집으로...) is a 2002 South Korean drama film written and directed by Lee Jeong-hyang. It tells the heartwarming story of a grandmother and her city-born grandson who comes to live with her in a rural village. The film was named best picture at South Korea's 39th annual Grand Bell (Daejong) Awards and was the second-highest grossing homegrown film in South Korea in 2002. It was released on DVD and VHS in 2003 by Paramount Classics.

== Plot ==
Seven-year old Sang-woo (Yoo Seung-ho) is taken to the Korean countryside to stay with his 78-year-old mute grandmother (Kim Eul-boon) while his mother searches for a new job in Seoul. His grandmother cannot stand or walk erect and makes her way painstakingly with a walking stick.

Sang-woo, a spoiled city boy, is repulsed by the unsophisticated nature of his poor grandmother's home, which has neither electricity nor running water. He is rude to her, ignoring her at times and calling her a byungshin, "retard", or dummy.

Sang-woo continues to attempt to acclimatize to his unfamiliar environment. One of the grandmother's neighbors is a hard-working country boy who attempts to become friends with Sang-woo, but is rebuffed. The other is a young girl who Sang-Woo is enamored of, but she is more interested in the country boy.

Meanwhile, Sang-woo's grandmother is patient and hardworking, spending her time caring for her melons and attempting to care for Sang-woo despite his disdain. He grudgingly threads her needles because her eyesight is bad but otherwise he spends all his time playing alone. His Game Boy runs out of batteries so he asks his grandmother for money for new ones. But she is poor and has none. Sang-woo insults her, throws away her shoes, breaks one of her vases, and draws graffiti on her house walls. He steals her ornamental hairpin and tries to trade it at a local shop but the shopkeeper, a friend of his grandmother's, hits him on the head and sends him home.

Sang-woo complains about the food and demands his grandmother provide him with Kentucky Fried Chicken. She makes a laborious trip to town and brings home a hen, which she kills and boils. Sang-woo screams and rejects the drumstick but at night he eats it in secret. The next morning, his grandmother becomes ill. Sang-woo serves her the remaining chicken while caring for her and replaces the pin in her hair while she sleeps.

One day, Sang-woo gets up early and goes with his grandmother to the market where he sees how hard his grandmother persuades passers-by to buy her vegetables. After a long day at the market, she takes Sang-woo to a shop and buys him noodles and new shoes. When they are about to board the bus home, Sang-woo asks his grandma to buy him a Choco Pie. She trades a melon for several Choco Pies for Sang-woo. However, when they are about to board the bus back to their home, Sang-Woo tells her he wants to ride alone as the girl he likes is also on board. The grandmother tries to get Sang-Woo to take the rest of the produce with him but he refuses. Sang-woo reaches home well before his grandmother and feels remorseful when he realizes that his grandmother has had to walk all the way back from town carrying their purchases.

Sang-woo gradually develops sympathy towards his grandmother and their relationship begins to deepen. As she is unable to read or write, he starts to make some simple greeting cards for her to express his love and gratitude. His overall attitude improves and he becomes more humble, eventually apologizing to the neighborhood boy and seeking his friendship. Finally Sang-woo's mother returns, and takes him back to Seoul. His depth of feeling for his grandmother is revealed when the bus leaves and he leaps to the back window to wave his tearful farewells. The film closes with the grandmother continuing to live alone in the thatched-roof house but with the letters of love from her grandson.

An ending credit notes that the film is dedicated to all grandmothers around the world.

== Cast ==
=== Main ===
- Kim Eul-boon as Grandmother
- Yoo Seung-ho as Sang-woo

=== Supporting ===
- Dong Hyo-hee as Sang-woo's mother
- Min Kyung-hyun as Cheol-yi, country boy, neighbor of the grandmother
- Im Eun-kyung as Hae-yeon

== Production ==
The film was filmed in and around Jeetongma, North Gyeongsang Province, South Korea.

== Reception ==
The film received generally positive reviews from both Western and Korean critics. The review aggregator Rotten Tomatoes reported that 75% of critics gave the film positive reviews, based on 56 reviews, with the website's critics consensus calling it "a simple story told with much warmth and compassion." Steven Rea from the Philadelphia Inquirer gave the film 3.5 stars out of 4 saying that "Jeong-Hyang Lee's film is deceptively simple, deeply satisfying."

Many critics praised the style of the movie as well as the acting of the inexperienced Kim Eul-boon who at 78, had not only never acted before, but never even seen a film. The film went on to win the Best Film and Best screenplay awards at the Grand Bell Awards, the Oscar's equivalent in South Korea. It was also nominated for Best Asian Film at the 22nd Hong Kong Film Awards, but lost to My Sassy Girl, another South Korean film.

Preceded by Joint Security Area	Grand Bell Awards for Best Film; 2002	Succeeded by Memories of Murder
