= Kim Hyeong-jun =

South Korean filmmaker (born 1968)

- Born: August 8, 1968 (age 58); South Korea
- Occupations: Film director Screenwriter; Producer
- Years active: 2005–present

Korean name
- Hangul: 김형준
- RR: Gim Hyeongjun
- MR: Kim Hyŏngjun

Kim Hyeong-jun (Korean: 김형준; born August 8, 1968) is a South Korean film director, screenwriter and producer.

== Filmography ==
=== Film ===
Year	Film	Credited as		
Year	Film	Director	Writer	Producer
2005	Daddy-Long-Legs	No	Yes	Yes
2006	Detective ODD	No	No	Yes
2007	Zig Zag Love	No	Yes	No
2010	No Mercy	Yes	Yes	No
2012	The Scent	Yes	Yes	No

== See also ==
- List of Korean-language films
