= Asiaq =

Inuit deity

In Inuit mythology, Asiaq is a weather goddess (or, more rarely a god) and was quite frequently invoked by the Angakoq for good weather, for instance if spring was late it was important to content her and make sure she would send rain and melt the ice.

In Greenland, she is the mother of weather, who decides the quantity and the time for snow to fall.

Asiaq is also the eponym of Asiaq Greenland Survey, a research institute in Nuuk.
