= Lee Jeong-hyang =

South Korean film director and screenwriter

- Born: April 13, 1964 (age 62); South Korea
- Occupation: DirectorScreenwriter

Korean name
- Hangul: 이정향
- RR: I Jeonghyang
- MR: I Chŏnghyang

Lee Jeong-hyang (Korean: 이정향; born April 13, 1964) is a South Korean film director and screenwriter. She is best known for The Way Home (2002), a film she wrote and directed which won her Best Film and Best Original Screenplay at the Grand Bell Awards.

== Life and career ==
Born in South Korea, Lee attended Sogang University, majoring in French Language and Literature. She subsequently entered The Korean Academy of Film Arts (KAFA) in 1988 and was a part of its fourth graduating class.

Upon graduation from KAFA, Lee worked as an assistant director on Declaration of Genius (1995), a film by Lee Jang-ho, a director who came to fame in the mid-1970s. It was during this time in 1995, when the government censorship was at its peak, that Lee began working on the script of what became her writer-directorial feature film debut, Art Museum by the Zoo (1998). Although only released towards the end of the year on December 19, 1998, the film became the fifth highest-grossing film of the year. The film was a semi-autobiographical romantic comedy about two strangers who end up living together and co-writing a screenplay about their relationship. Both leads won major awards for their performances: Shim Eun-ha won Best Actress at the Grand Bell Awards, and Lee Sung-jae won several Best New Actor awards.

Lee's second feature length film as a writer-director, The Way Home (2002), is undoubtedly her most successful and critically acclaimed to date. The film tells the story of a city-born boy who goes to live with his mute, elderly grandmother in her rural village. The young adolescent struggles to overcome their differences in lifestyles and attitude, but eventually grows to admire and appreciate the simpler, more traditional lifestyle. With its "subtle characterization, sensibility, and aesthetics", the film appealed to mass audiences, becoming Korea's second highest-grossing film of the year. It went on to win Best Film and Best Original Screenplay for Lee at the Grand Bell Awards, which is South Korea's equivalent of the Oscars.

For the next two years, Lee took some time off simply to relax following the enormous success of The Way Home. By 2004, she "started to add the finishing touches to the synopsis of A Reason to Live" (2011). The film centres around the idea of forgiveness, particularly concerning the victims of fatal accidents and their families. Having originally written the synopsis years ago, prior to her debut, many changes had to be made to adjust to her different outlooks and opinion on life. The film premiered at the 16th Busan International Film Festival, nine years after the release of her last film.

== Filmography ==
Year	Film	Credited as	
Year	Film	Director	Writer
1998	Art Museum by the Zoo	Yes	Yes
2002	The Way Home	Yes	Yes
2011	A Reason to Live	Yes	Yes
