= Kang Woo-suk =

South Korean filmmaker (born 1960)

- Born: November 10, 1960 (age 66); Gyeongju, South Korea
- Occupations: Film director, screenwriter
- Years active: 1989–present

Korean name
- Hangul: 강우석
- Hanja: 康祐碩
- RR: Gang Useok
- MR: Kang Usŏk

Kang Woo-suk (Korean: 강우석; born November 10, 1960, in Gyeongsan) is a South Korean film producer and director. He has often been called the most powerful man in Korean cinema, topping Cine21 magazine's list of '50 Most Powerful Men in Korean Cinema' for seven consecutive years from 1998 to 2004.

== Career ==
Kang started as a director of successful comedy films before directing Two Cops in 1993, a box office hit whose success at the time was only surpassed by Sopyonje. More recently, he has directed several Korean blockbusters, including the Public Enemy series (Public Enemy, Another Public Enemy, and Public Enemy Returns) and Silmido.

After the success of Two Cops Kang founded his own film production and distribution company, Cinema Service, which has since become the biggest homegrown studio in the Korean film industry and along with CJ Entertainment, one of the two largest film distributors in South Korea. In 2005, Kang stepped down from the position of president of Cinema Service, claiming he intends to concentrate more on his personal film projects.

== Filmography ==
=== As director ===
Filmmaking credits
Year	Title		Credited as			Ref.
Year	English	Korean	Director	Writer	Producer	Ref.
1988	Sweet Brides	달콤한 신부들	Yes	No	No	
1989	Happiness Does Not Come In Grades	행복은 성적순이 아니잖아요	Yes	No	No	
1990	I Stand Up Every Day	나는 날마다 일어선다	Yes	No	No	
1991	Who Saw The Dragon's Claws	누가 용의 발톱을 보았는가	Yes	No	No	
1991	Teenage Love Song	열 아홉의 절망 끝에 부르는 하나의 사랑 노래	Yes	Yes	No	
1991	I Want to Live Just Until 20 Years Old	스무살까지만 살고 싶어요	Yes	Yes	No	
1992	Mister Mama	미스터 맘마	Yes	No	Yes	
1993	Two Cops	투캅스	Yes	No	Yes	
1994	How to Top My Wife	마누라 죽이기	Yes	No	Yes	
1996	Two Cops 2	투캅스 2	Yes	No	Yes	
1996	Seven Reasons Beer Is Better Than Love	맥주가 애인보다 좋은 일곱가지 이유	Yes	No	No	
1998	Bedroom And Courtroom	생과부 위자료 청구 소송	Yes	No	No	
2002	Public Enemy	공공의 적	Yes	No	Yes	
2003	Silmido	실미도	Yes	No	No	
2005	Another Public Enemy	공공의 적2	Yes	No	Yes	
2006	Hanbando	한반도	Yes	No	No	
2008	Public Enemy Returns	강철중: 공공의 적 1-1	Yes	No	No	
2010	Moss	이끼	Yes	No	No	
2011	Glove	글러브	Yes	No	No	
2013	Fists of Legend	전설의 주먹	Yes	No	No	
2016	The Map Against The World	고산자, 대동여지도	Yes	No	No	

=== As producer ===
Year	Title		Director
Year	English	Korean	Director
1995	Mom Has a Lover!	엄마에게 애인이 생겼어요!	Kim Dong-bin
1997	Holiday in Seoul	홀리데이 인 서울	Kim Ui-seok
1998	Two Cops 3	투캅스 3	Kim Sang-jin
1999	Ghost in Love	자귀모	Lee Kwang-hoon
2000	A Masterpiece In My Life	불후의 명작	Shim Kwang-jin
2001	Last Present	선물	Oh Ki-hwan
2001	Guns & Talks	킬러들의 수다	Jang Jin
2002	No Blood No Tears	피도 눈물도 없이	Ryoo Seung-wan
2002	Jail Breakers	광복절 특사	Kim Sang-jin
2004	Ghost House	귀신이 산다	Kim Sang-jin
2005	Blossom Again	사랑니	Jung Ji-woo
2005	Princess Aurora	오로라 공주	Bang Eun-jin
2007	My Son	아들	Jang Jin
2007	Shadows in the Palace	궁녀	Kim Mee-jung
2007	Venus and Mars	싸움	Han Ji-seung
2008	Hellcats	뜨거운 것이 좋아	Kwon Chil-in
2008	The Divine Weapon	신기전	Kim Yoo-jin
2008	Modern Boy	모던 보이	Jung Ji-woo
2009	Castaway on the Moon	김씨 표류기	Lee Hae-jun
2009	White Night	백야행 - 하얀 어둠 속을 걷다	Park Shin-woo
2009	No Mercy	용서는 없다	Kim Hyeong-jun
2009	Attack the Gas Station 2	주유소 습격사건 2	Kim Sang-jin
2011	Romantic Heaven	로맨틱 헤븐	Jang Jin

=== As assistant director ===
Year	Title	
Year	English	Korean
1984	Woman Who Grabbed The Rod	장대를 잡은 여자
1984	Deer Hunting	사슴 사냥
1984	Song of a Small Love	작은 사랑의 노래
1985	Ae-ma Woman 3	애마부인 3
1986	Days of Seduction	유혹시대
1986	Banghwangui Kkeut	방황의 끝
1987	Lee Su-il Story	성 리수일뎐

=== As screenwriter ===
Year	Title	
Year	English	Korean
1986	Dancing Daughter	춤추는 딸
1989	Sand Castle	모래성

== Accolades ==
=== Awards and nominations ===
Year	Award	Category	Recipient	Result
1994	30th Baeksang Arts Awards	Best Director	Two Cops	Won
1994	15th Blue Dragon Film Awards	Most Popular Film (Note: awarded to the movie with the highest viewership throughout the previous year)	Two Cops	Won
2004	24th Blue Dragon Film Awards	Best Film	Silmido	Won
2004	24th Blue Dragon Film Awards	Best Director	Silmido	Won
2004	Baeksang Arts Awards	Grand Prize for Film	Silmido	Won
2004	2004 Grand Bell Awards	Best Film	Silmido	Nominated
2004	2004 Grand Bell Awards	Best Director	Silmido	Nominated
2010	18th Chunsa Film Art Awards	Best Film	Moss	Won
2010	18th Chunsa Film Art Awards	Best Director	Moss	Won
2010	47th Grand Bell Awards	Best Film	Moss	Nominated
2010	47th Grand Bell Awards	Best Director	Moss	Won
2010	31st Blue Dragon Film Awards	Best Film	Moss	Nominated
2010	31st Blue Dragon Film Awards	Best Director	Moss	Won
2011	47th Baeksang Arts Awards	Best Film	Moss	Nominated
2011	47th Baeksang Arts Awards	Best Director (Film)	Moss	Nominated

=== Listicle ===
Listicle of Kang
Publisher	Year	List	Placement	Ref.
Cine21	1998	Chungmuro 50 Power Filmmaker	1st	
Cine21	1999	Chungmuro 50 Power Filmmaker	1st	
Cine21	2000	Chungmuro 50 Power Filmmaker	1st	
Cine21	2001	Chungmuro 50 Power Filmmaker	1st	
Cine21	2002	Chungmuro 50 Power Filmmaker	1st	
Cine21	2003	Chungmuro 50 Power Filmmaker	1st	
Cine21	2004	Chungmuro 50 Power Filmmaker	1st	
Cine21	2005	Chungmuro 50 Power Filmmaker	2nd	
Cine21	2006	Chungmuro 50 Power Filmmaker	2nd	
Cine21	2007	Chungmuro 50 Power Filmmaker	3rd	

== See also ==
- List of Korean film directors
- Cinema of Korea
