= Ko Im-pyo =

South Korean film editor (born 1962)

- Born: 1962 (age 63–64); South Korea
- Occupation: Film editor

Korean name
- Hangul: 고임표
- Hanja: 高任枃
- RR: Go Impyo
- MR: Ko Imp'yo

Ko Im-pyo is a South Korean film editor.

== Selected filmography ==
- First Kiss (1998)
- If the Sun Rises in the West (1998)
- Attack the Gas Station (1999)
- Kick the Moon (2001)
- A.F.R.I.K.A. (2002)
- Public Enemy (2002)
- My Teacher, Mr. Kim (2003)
- My Wife is a Gangster 2 (2003)
- A Tale of Two Sisters (2003)
- Too Beautiful to Lie (2004)
- 100 Days with Mr. Arrogant (2004)
- Dance with the Wind (2004)
- Ghost House (2004)
- Another Public Enemy (2005)
- Duelist (2005)
- Running Wild (2006)
- The Perfect Couple (2007)
- Small Town Rivals (2007)
- Attack the Gas Station 2 (2010)
- Moss (2010)

== Awards ==
- 2010 18th Chunsa Film Art Awards: Best Editing (Moss)
