= Cinema Service =

1993–2016 South Korean film company

- Native name: 시네마서비스
- Formerly: Kang Woo-suk Productions (1993–1995)
- Type: Subsidiary (Private until 2006)
- Industry: Film
- Founded: 1993
- Founder: Kang Woo-suk
- Defunct: 2016
- Fate: Folded into CJ ENM Films & Television
- Successor: CJ Entertainment
- Headquarters: 4F 5 37-gil Dosandaero, Gangnam-gu, Seoul, Korea
- Products: Motion pictures
- Services: Film distribution; Film production
- Parent: CJ E&M
- Website: Official website (Archived, 8 March 2017)

Cinema Service (Korean: 시네마서비스) was a South Korean film production and distribution company.

== History ==
The company was founded in 1993 by film director Kang Woo-suk as "Kang Woo-suk Productions", before taking the name Cinema Service in 1995. It survived during the Asian financial crisis and was in position to take advantage of the popularity boom of Korean cinema, becoming a major player in the East Asian film industry.

In 2000, Cinema Service merged with Locus Holdings (later Plenus Entertainment).

In 2005, the founder Kang Woo-suk relinquished his position at the company, wanting to concentrate more on his personal film projects. Plenus Entertainment merged with CJ Entertainment and Cinema Service became independent of the Plenus Entertainment, and later on merged with CJ Entertainment in 2006.

In 2008, Cinema Service exited the movie publishing and distribution business to focus on movie production until 2014. Now, all Cinema Service films are distributed by CJ Entertainment.

In 2016, the company closed down, folding its operations under CJ Entertainment due to financial pressure.

== See also ==
- CJ Entertainment
- Cinema of Korea
- Contemporary culture of South Korea
- Korean Wave
