= Baeksang Arts Award for Best Actress – Film =

Annual Korean award

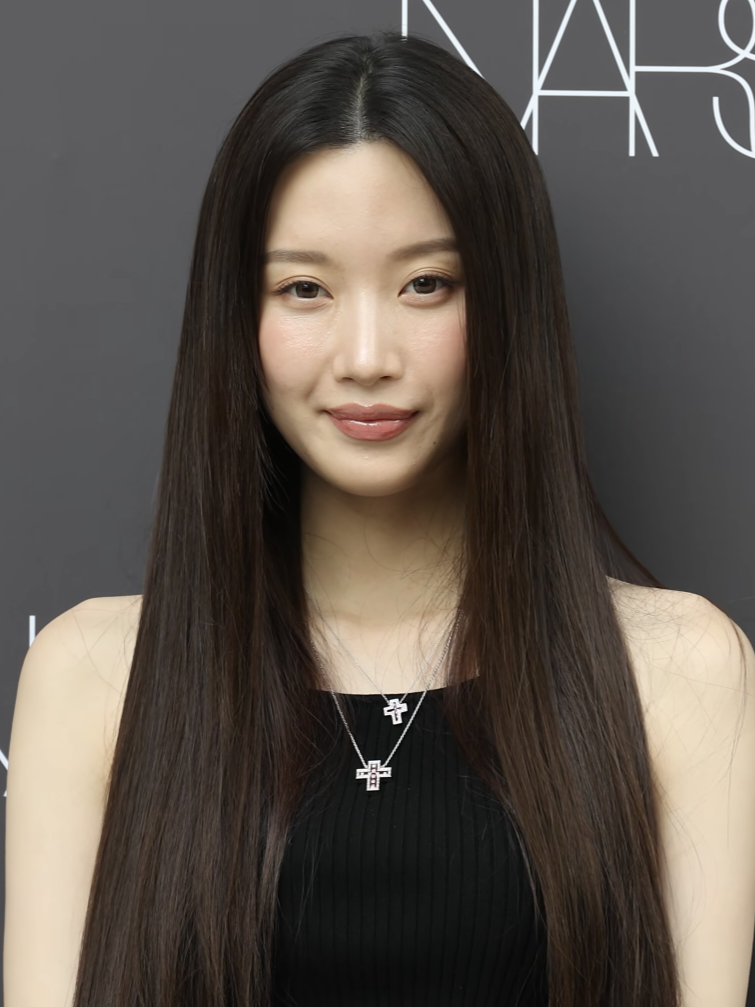
- 2026 recipient: Moon Ga-young
- Awarded for: Best performance by an actress in a leading role in a South Korean film
- Country: South Korea
- Presented by: Baeksang Arts Awards
- Most recent winner: Moon Ga-young; Once We Were Us (2026)
- Website: baeksangartsawards

The Baeksang Arts Award for Best Actress – Film (Korean: 백상예술대상 영화부문 여자 최우수 연기상; RR: Baeksang Yesul Daesang Yeonghwa Bumun Yeoja Choeusu Yeongisang) is an award presented annually at the Baeksang Arts Awards ceremony organised by Ilgan Sports and JTBC Plus, affiliates of JoongAng Ilbo, usually in the second quarter of each year in Seoul.

== Winners and nominees ==
Table key
‡	Indicates the winner

=== 1960s ===
Year	Winner and nominees	Film	Original title	Role(s)
1966 (2nd)	Moon Jung-suk ‡	Market		
1967 (3rd)	Moon Jung-suk ‡	Late Autumn		
1968 (4th)	Moon Hee ‡	Guests Who Arrived on the Last Train	막차로 온 손님들	
1969 (5th)	Kim Ji-mee ‡	Prince Daewon	대원군	

=== 1970s ===
Year	Winner and nominees	Film	Original title	Role(s)
1970 (6th)	Yoon Jeong-hee ‡	The Old Jar Craftsman	독짓는 늙은이	
1971 (7th)	Yoon Jeong-hee ‡	Affair on the Beach	해변의 정사	
1972 (8th)	Ko Eun-ah ‡	Confession	고백	
1973 (9th)	Yoon Jeong-hee ‡	Oyster Village	석화촌	
1974 (10th)	Kim Ji-mee ‡	Weed	잡초	
1976 (12th)	Kim Ja-ok ‡	The Kept Woman	보통 여자	
1977 (13th)	Tae Hyun-sil ‡	Wife	아내	
1978 (14th)	Kim Yun-gyeong ‡	The Life of Ok-rye	옥례기	
1978 (14th)	Yoon Mi-ra ‡	Under the Sky without My Mom	엄마 없는 하늘 아래	
1979 (15th)	Kim Ja-ok ‡	The Woman on the Ferris Wheel	목마 위의 여자	

=== 1980s ===
Year	Winner and nominees	Film	Original title	Role(s)
1980 (16th)	Yu Ji-in ‡	I Saw the Wild Ginseng	심봤다	
1981 (17th)	Jeong Yun-hui ‡	The One I Love	사랑하는 사람아	Young-joo
1982 (18th)	Jeong Yun-hui ‡	Parrot Cries with Its Body	앵무새의 몸으로 울었다	Su-ryrn
1983 (19th)	Jung Young-sook ‡	Temptation	유혹	
1984 (20th)	Won Mi-kyung ‡	Mulleya Mulleya	여인 잔혹사 물레야 물레야	Gillye
1985 (21st)	Lee Mi-sook ‡	Warm It Was That Winter	그해 겨울은 따뜻했네	Oh-mok / Su-yin
1986 (22nd)	Lee Bo-hee ‡	Eoudong	어우동	Uhwudong
1987 (23rd)	Kim Ji-mee ‡	Ticket	티켓	Ji-sook
1988 (24th)	Lee Bo-hee ‡	You My Rose Mellow	접시꽃 당신	Su-kyung
1989 (25th)	Lee Hye-young ‡	The Age of Success	성공시대	Sung So-bi

=== 1990s ===
Year	Winner and nominees	Film	Original title	Role(s)
1990 (26th)	Chang Mi-hee ‡	Country of Fire	불의 나라	Jeong Eun-ha
1990 (26th)	Kang Soo-yeon	All That Falls Has Wings	추락하는 것은 날개가 있다	Yoon-joo
1991 (27th)	Lee Hye-sook ‡	Silver Stallion	은마는 오지 않는다	Eon-rae
1991 (27th)	Hwang Shin-hye	The Woman Who Walks on Water	물 위를 걷는 여자	Nan-hee
1992 (28th)	Kang Soo-yeon ‡	The Road to the Race Track	경마장 가는 길	J
1992 (28th)	Choi Jin-sil	Susanne Brink's Arirang	수잔브링크의 아리랑	Susanne
1993 (29th)	Bae Jong-ok ‡	Walking to Heaven	걸어서 하늘까지	Ji-suk
1993 (29th)	Choi Jin-sil	Mister Mamma	미스터 맘마	Yeong-ju
1993 (29th)	Kang Soo-yeon	The Blue in You	그대 안의 블루	Yoo-lim
1993 (29th)	Kim Hye-soo	First Love	첫사랑	Park Young-shin
1994 (30th)	Choi Jin-sil ‡	I Wish for What Is Forbidden to Me	나는 소망한다 내게 금지된 것을	Kang Min-ju
1994 (30th)	Shim Hye-jin	To the Starry Island	그 섬에 가고싶다	Oknimi
1994 (30th)	Kang Soo-yeon	That Woman, That Man	그 여자, 그 남자	Eun
1995 (31st)	Choi Myung-gil ‡	Rosy Life	장미빛 인생	Madam
1995 (31st)	Choi Jin-sil	How to Top My Wife	마누라 죽이기	Jang So-young
1995 (31st)	Shim Hye-jin	Out to the World	세상밖으로	Hye-jin
1996 (32nd)	Shim Hye-jin ‡	Go Alone Like Musso's Horn	무소의 뿔처럼 혼자서 가라	Kyung-hye
1996 (32nd)	Kim Hye-soo	Dr. Bong	닥터봉	Hwang Yeo-jin
1996 (32nd)	Jung Sung-kyung	A Hot Roof	개같은 날의 오후	Jang Yun-hee
1996 (32nd)	Bang Eun-jin	301, 302	삼공일 삼공이	Song-hee
1997 (33rd)	Shim Hye-jin ‡	Green Fish	초록 물고기	Mi-ae
1997 (33rd)	Choi Jin-sil	Ghost Mamma	고스트 맘마	Cha In-ju
1997 (33rd)	Kang Soo-yeon	Their Last Love Affair	지독한 사랑	Young-hee
1997 (33rd)	Shim Eun-ha	Born to Kill	본 투 킬	Soo-ha
1998 (34th)	Shim Eun-ha ‡	Christmas in August	8월의 크리스마스	Kim Da-rim
1998 (34th)	Choi Jin-sil	The Letter	편지	Lee Jeong-in
1998 (34th)	Shin Eun-kyung	Downfall	창	Bang Woo-ri
1998 (34th)	Kang Soo-yeon	Blackjack	블랙잭	Jang Eun-yun
1999 (35th)	Jeon Do-yeon ‡	A Promise	약속	Chae Hee-ju
1999 (35th)	Shim Eun-ha	Art Museum by the Zoo	미술관 옆 동물원	Lee Choon-hee
1999 (35th)	Lee Mi-sook	An Affair	정사	Seo-hyun
1999 (35th)	Kang Soo-yeon	Girls' Night Out	처녀들의 저녁식사	Ho-jung

=== 2000s ===
Year	Winner and nominees	Film	Original title	Role(s)
2000 (36th)	Kang Soo-yeon ‡	Rainbow Trout	송어	Jung-hwa
2000 (36th)	Jeon Do-yeon	Happy End	해피엔드	Choi Bo-ra
2000 (36th)	Shim Eun-ha	Tell Me Something	텔 미 썸딩	Chae Soo-yeon
2000 (36th)	Shin Eun-kyung	General Hospital: The Movie - A Thousand Days	종합병원 The Movie 천일동안	Kang Eun-soo
2001 (37th)	Jeon Do-yeon ‡	I Wish I Had a Wife	나도 아내가 있었으면 좋겠다	Jung Won-ju
2001 (37th)	Lee Young-ae	Joint Security Area (film)	공동경비구역 JSA	Maj. Sophie E.Jean
2001 (37th)	Suh Jung	The Isle	섬	Hee-jin
2002 (38th)	Bae Doona ‡	Take Care of My Cat	고양이를 부탁해	Yoo Tae-hee
2002 (38th)	Lee Young-ae	One Fine Spring Day	봄날은 간다	Han Eun-soo
2002 (38th)	Jang Jin-young	Sorum	소름	Sun-young
2002 (38th)	Kim Hee-sun	Wanee & Junah	와니와 준하	Wa-ni
2003 (39th)	Uhm Jung-hwa ‡	Marriage is a Crazy Thing	결혼은 미친 짓이다	Yeon-hee
2003 (39th)	Moon So-ri	Oasis	오아시스	Han Gong-ju
2003 (39th)	Kim Jung-eun	Marrying the Mafia	가문의 영광	Jang Jin-kyeong
2003 (39th)	Yunjin Kim	Ardor	밀애	Mi-heun
2004 (40th)	Kim Ha-neul ‡	Too Beautiful to Lie	그녀를 믿지 마세요	Joo Yeong-ju
2004 (40th)	Lee Mi-sook	Untold Scandal	스캔들 - 조선남녀상열지사	Lady Cho
2004 (40th)	Jeon Do-yeon	Untold Scandal	스캔들 - 조선남녀상열지사	Lady Jeong
2004 (40th)	Kim Sun-ah	The Greatest Expectation	위대한 유산	Mi-young
2005 (41st)	Kim Hye-soo ‡	Hypnotized	얼굴없는 미녀	Ji-su
2005 (41st)	Jeon Do-yeon	My Mother, the Mermaid	인어공주	Kim Na-young / Jo Yeon-soon
2005 (41st)	Lee Eun-ju	The Scarlet Letter	주홍글씨	Choi Ga-hee
2006 (42nd)	Lee Young-ae ‡	Sympathy for Lady Vengeance	친절한 금자씨	Lee Geum-ja
2006 (42nd)	Jang Jin-young	Blue Swallow	청연	Park Kyung-won
2006 (42nd)	Jeon Do-yeon	You Are My Sunshine	너는 내 운명	Jeon Eun-ha
2006 (42nd)	Kang Hye-jung	Rules of Dating	연애의 목적	Choi Hong
2006 (42nd)	Uhm Jung-hwa	Princess Aurora	오로라공주	Jung Soon-jung
2007 (43rd)	Yum Jung-ah ‡	The Old Garden	오래된 정원	Han Yun-hee
2007 (43rd)	Im Soo-jung	I'm a Cyborg, But That's OK	싸이보그지만 괜찮아	Cha Young-goon
2007 (43rd)	Jang Jin-young	Between Love and Hate	연애, 그 참을 수 없는 가벼움	Yeon-ah
2007 (43rd)	Kim Hye-soo	Tazza: The High Rollers	타짜	Madam Jeong
2007 (43rd)	Na Moon-hee	Cruel Winter Blues	열혈남아	Dae-Sik's mother, Kim Jeong-sim
2008 (44th)	Kim Min-hee ‡	Hellcats	뜨거운 것이 좋아	Kim Ah-mi
2008 (44th)	Im Soo-jung	Happiness	행복	Eun-hee
2008 (44th)	Jeon Do-yeon	Secret Sunshine	밀양	Lee Shin-ae
2008 (44th)	Kim Jung-eun	Forever the Moment	우리 생애 최고의 순간	Kim Hye-kyeong
2008 (44th)	Yunjin Kim	Seven Days	세븐 데이즈	Yoo Ji-yeon
2009 (45th)	Son Ye-jin ‡	My Wife Got Married	아내가 결혼했다	Joo In-ah
2009 (45th)	Gong Hyo-jin	Crush and Blush	미쓰 홍당무	Yang Mi-sook
2009 (45th)	Kim Hae-sook	Viva! Love	경축! 우리사랑	Bong-soon
2009 (45th)	Kim Gyu-ri	Portrait of a Beauty	미인도	Shin Yun-bok
2009 (45th)	Soo Ae	Sunny	님은 먼곳에	Soon-yi / Sunny

=== 2010s ===
Year	Winner and nominees	Film	Original title	Role(s)
2010 (46th)	Ha Ji-won ‡	Closer to Heaven	내 사랑 내 곁에	Lee Ji-soo
2010 (46th)	Choi Kang-hee	Goodbye Mom	애자	Park Ae-ja
2010 (46th)	Kim Hye-ja	Mother	마더	Mother
2010 (46th)	Kim Ok-vin	Thirst	박쥐	Tae-ju
2010 (46th)	Seo Woo	Paju	파주	Choi Eun-mo
2011 (47th)	Tang Wei ‡	Late Autumn	만추	Anna
2011 (47th)	Jo Yeo-jeong	The Servant	방자전	Chun-hyang
2011 (47th)	Seo Young-hee	Bedevilled	김복남 살인사건의 전말	Kim Bok-nam
2011 (47th)	Soo Ae	Midnight FM	심야의 FM	Ko Sun-young
2011 (47th)	Yoon Jeong-hee	Poetry	시	Yang Mi-ja
2012 (48th)	Uhm Jung-hwa ‡	Dancing Queen	댄싱퀸	Herself
2012 (48th)	Jung Ryeo-won	Pained	통증	Dong-hyun
2012 (48th)	Kim Min-hee	Helpless	화차	Kang Seon-yeong / Cha Gyeong-seon
2012 (48th)	Shim Eun-kyung	Sunny	써니	Im Na-mi
2012 (48th)	Son Ye-jin	Spellbound	오싹한 연애	Kang Yeo-ri
2013 (49th)	Kim Min-hee ‡	Very Ordinary Couple	연애의 온도	Jang Young
2013 (49th)	Han Hyo-joo	Love 911	반창꼬	Mi-soo, doctor
2013 (49th)	Im Soo-jung	All About My Wife	내 아내의 모든 것	Yeon Jung-in
2013 (49th)	Jo Min-su	Pietà	피에타	Jang Mi-sun
2013 (49th)	Lee Jung-hyun	Juvenile Offender	범죄소년	Hyo-Seung
2014 (50th)	Shim Eun-kyung ‡	Miss Granny	수상한 그녀	Young Oh Mal-soon / Oh Doo-ri
2014 (50th)	Jeon Do-yeon	Way Back Home	집으로 가는 길	Song Jeong-yeon
2014 (50th)	Kim Hee-ae	Thread of Lies	우아한 거짓말	Hyun-sook
2014 (50th)	Moon Jeong-hee	Hide and Seek	숨바꼭질	Joo-hee
2014 (50th)	Uhm Ji-won	Hope	소원	Kim Mi-hee
2015 (51st)	Yum Jung-ah ‡	Cart	카트	Sun-hee
2015 (51st)	Bae Doona	A Girl at My Door	도희야	Lee Young-nam
2015 (51st)	Kim Sae-ron	A Girl at My Door	도희야	Sun Do-hee
2015 (51st)	Shin Min-a	Gyeongju	경주	Gong Yoon-hee
2015 (51st)	Son Ye-jin	The Pirates	해적: 바다로 간 산적	Yeo-wol
2016 (52nd)	Jeon Do-yeon ‡	The Shameless	무뢰한	Kim Hye-kyung
2016 (52nd)	Han Hyo-joo	The Beauty Inside	뷰티인사이드	Yi-soo
2016 (52nd)	Jun Ji-hyun	Assassination	암살	Ahn Ok-yun / Mitsuko
2016 (52nd)	Kim Hye-soo	Coin Locker Girl	차이나타운	Ma Woo-hee / Mother
2016 (52nd)	Lee Jung-hyun	Alice in Earnestland	성실한 나라의 앨리스	Jung Soo-nam
2017 (53rd)	Son Ye-jin ‡	The Last Princess	덕혜옹주	Princess Deokhye
2017 (53rd)	Kim Min-hee	The Handmaiden	아가씨	Lady / Izumi Hideko
2017 (53rd)	Kim Hye-soo	Familyhood	굿바이 싱글	Go Joo-yeon
2017 (53rd)	Youn Yuh-jung	The Bacchus Lady	죽여주는 여자, The Killer Woman	So-Young
2017 (53rd)	Han Ye-ri	Worst Woman	최악의 하루	Eun-hee
2018 (54th)	Na Moon-hee ‡	I Can Speak	아이 캔 스피크	Na Ok-Bun
2018 (54th)	Kim Ok-vin	The Villainess	악녀	Sook-hee / Chae Yeon-soo
2018 (54th)	Kim Tae-ri	Little Forest	리틀 포레스트	Song Hye-won
2018 (54th)	Son Ye-jin	Be with You	지금 만나러 갑니다	Soo-ah
2018 (54th)	Choi Hee-seo	Anarchist from Colony	박열	Kaneko Fumiko
2019 (55th)	Han Ji-min ‡	Miss Baek	미쓰백	Baek Sang-ah
2019 (55th)	Go Ah-sung	A Resistance	항거:유관순 이야기	Yu Gwan-sun
2019 (55th)	Kim Hyang-gi	Innocent Witness	증인	Ji-woo
2019 (55th)	Kim Hye-soo	Default	국가부도의 날	Han Shi-hyeon
2019 (55th)	Kim Hee-ae	Herstory	허스토리	Moon Jung-sook

=== 2020s ===
Year	Winner and nominees	Film	Original title	Role(s)
2020 (56th)	Jeon Do-yeon ‡	Birthday	생일	Park Soon-nam
2020 (56th)	Kim So-jin	Another Child	미성년	Mi-hee
2020 (56th)	Kim Hee-ae	Moonlit Winter	윤희에게	Yoon-hee
2020 (56th)	Jung Yu-mi	Kim Ji-young: Born 1982	82년생 김지영	Kim Ji-young
2020 (56th)	Cho Yeo-jeong	Parasite	기생충	Choi Yeon-gyo
2021 (57th)	Jeon Jong-seo‡	The Call	콜	Oh Young-sook
2021 (57th)	Go Ah-sung	Samjin Company English Class	삼진그룹 영어토익반	Lee Ja-yeong
2021 (57th)	Kim Hye-soo	The Day I Died: Unclosed Case	내가 죽던 날	Kim Hyeon-soo
2021 (57th)	Moon So-ri	Three Sisters	세 자매	Mi-yeon
2021 (57th)	Ye Soo-jung	An Old Lady	69세	Shim Hyo‑jeong
2022 (58th)	Lee Hye-young ‡	In Front of Your Face	당신 얼굴 앞에서	Sang-ok
2022 (58th)	Go Doo-shim	Everglow	빛나는 순간	Jin-ok
2022 (58th)	Park So-dam	Special Delivery	특송	Jang Eun-ha
2022 (58th)	Im Yoon-ah	Miracle: Letters to the President	기적	Song Ra-hee
2022 (58th)	Jeon Jong-seo	Romance Without Love	연애 빠진 로맨스	Ham Ja-young
2023 (59th)	Tang Wei ‡	Decision to Leave	헤어질 결심	Song Seo-rae
2023 (59th)	Bae Doona	Next Sohee	다음 소희	Yoo-jin
2023 (59th)	Yang Mal-bok	The Apartment with Two Women	같은 속옷을 입는 두 여자	Su-gyeong
2023 (59th)	Yum Jung-ah	Life Is Beautiful	인생은 아름다워	Oh Se-yeon
2023 (59th)	Jeon Do-yeon	Kill Boksoon	길복순	Gil Bok-soon
2024 (60th)	Kim Go-eun ‡	Exhuma	파묘	Lee Hwa-rim
2024 (60th)	Jung Yu-mi	Sleep	잠	Soo-jin
2024 (60th)	Ra Mi-ran	Citizen of a Kind	시민덕희	Kim Deok-hee
2024 (60th)	Lee Hanee	Killing Romance	킬링 로맨스	Hwang Yeo-rae
2024 (60th)	Yum Jung-ah	Smugglers	밀수	Um Jin-sook
2025 (61st)	Jeon Do-yeon ‡	Revolver	리볼버	Ha Soo-young
2025 (61st)	Kim Go-eun	Love in the Big City	대도시의 사랑법	Ku Jae-hee
2025 (61st)	Kim Geum-soon	Jeong-sun	정순	Jeong-sun
2025 (61st)	Song Hye-kyo	Dark Nuns	검은 수녀들	Sister Junia / Kang Seong-Ae
2025 (61st)	Cho Yeo-jeong	Hidden Face	히든페이스	Shin Soo-yeon
2026 (62nd)	Moon Ga-young ‡	Once We Were Us	만약에 우리	Han Jeong-won
2026 (62nd)	Go Ah-sung	Pavane	파반느	Mi-jung
2026 (62nd)	Son Ye-jin	No Other Choice	어쩔수가없다	Lee Mi-ri
2026 (62nd)	Lee Hye-young	The Old Woman with the Knife	파과	Hornclaw / Godmother / Nails
2026 (62nd)	Han Ye-ri	Spring Night	봄밤	Yeong-gyeong

== Multiple awards and nominations ==
The following individuals received two or more Best Actress awards:

Wins	Actress
5	Jeon Do-yeon
3	Kim Ji-mee
3	Yoon Jeong-hee
2	Jeong Yun-hui
2	Kang Soo-yeon
2	Kim Ja-ok
2	Kim Min-hee
2	Lee Bo-hee
2	Moon Jung-suk
2	Uhm Jung-hwa
2	Shim Hye-jin
2	Son Ye-jin
2	Yum Jung-ah
2	Tang Wei

The following individuals received four or more Best Actress nominations:

Nominations	Actress
12	Jeon Do-yeon
8	Kang Soo-yeon
8	Kim Hye-soo
6	Choi Jin-sil
6	Son Ye-jin
4	Kim Min-hee
4	Shim Eun-ha
4	Shim Hye-jin
4	Yoon Jeong-hee
4	Yum Jung-ah

== Age superlatives ==
Record	Actress	Film	Age (in years)
Oldest winner	Na Moon-hee	I Can Speak	77 (2018)
Oldest nominee	Na Moon-hee	I Can Speak	77 (2018)
Youngest winner	Shim Eun-kyung	Miss Granny	19 (2014)
Youngest nominee	Kim Sae-ron	A Girl at My Door	14 (2015)

== Sources ==
- "Baeksang Arts Awards Nominees and Winners Lists". Naver Movie (in Korean).
- "Baeksang Arts Awards Winners Lists". Baeksang Arts Awards (in Korean).
