= Jeon Do-yeon =

South Korean actress (born 1973)

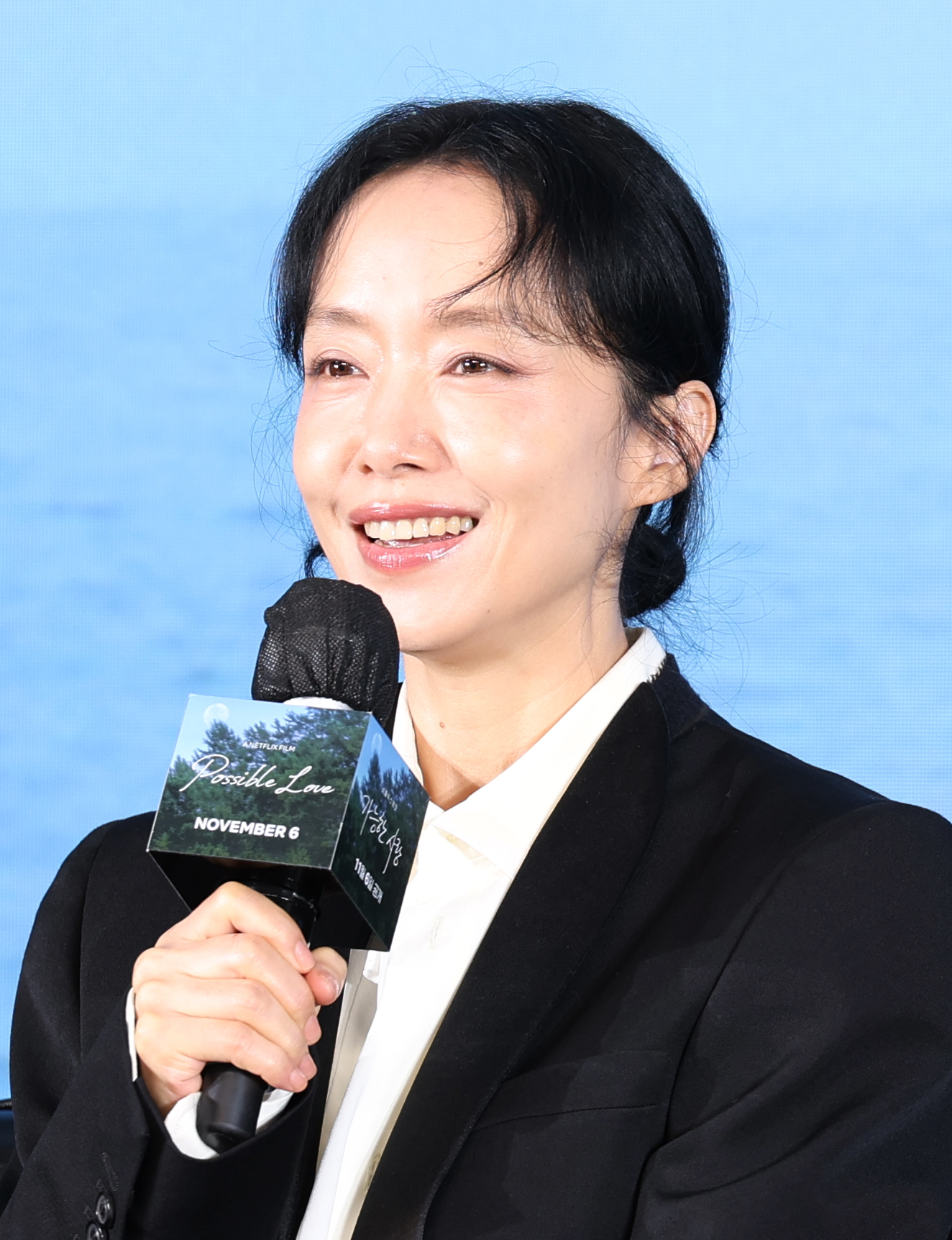
- Jeon in 2026
- Born: February 11, 1973 (age 53); Seoul, South Korea
- Education: Seoul Institute of the Arts
- Occupation: Actress
- Years active: 1990–present
- Agent: Management SOOP
- Height: 165 cm (5 ft 5 in)
- Spouse: Kang Shi-kyu (m. 2007)
- Children: 1
- Honours: Ordre des Arts et des Lettres Chevalier (2009)

Korean name
- Hangul: 전도연
- Hanja: 全道嬿
- RR: Jeon Doyeon
- MR: Chŏn Toyŏn
- Website: msoopent.com

Jeon Do-yeon (Korean: 전도연; born February 11, 1973) is a South Korean actress. She began her career in television before making her film debut with The Contact (1997), a melodrama that established her as a leading actress. Jeon gained further acclaim with A Promise (1998), a romantic tragedy, and The Harmonium in My Memory (1999).

Jeon's career reached new heights with You Are My Sunshine (2005). However, it was her role in Lee Chang-dong's Secret Sunshine (2007) that cemented her status as one of South Korea's finest actresses. Her portrayal of a grieving mother navigating faith and despair won her Best Actress at the 60th Cannes Film Festival, making her the first Korean actor to receive such recognition. Jeon's subsequent work included The Housemaid (2010), Way Back Home (2013), The Shameless (2015), Birthday (2019), and Kill Boksoon (2023).

Alongside her film work, Jeon has continued to appear in television dramas. In recent years, she starred in the series Crash Course in Romance (2023) and The Price of Confession (2025). Jeon is considered a role model for many young actresses in South Korea.

== Early life ==
Jeon Do-yeon was born on February 11, 1973, in Namgajwa-dong, Seodaemun District, Seoul, South Korea. She has two older brothers and is the youngest in her family. Born and raised in Seoul, she graduated from Bukgajwa Elementary School, Yeonhee Girls Middle School, Changduk Girls High School and Department of Broadcasting at Seoul Institute of the Arts.

== Career ==
=== 1990–1997: Beginnings and breakthrough ===
In 1990, Jeon made her debut in the entertainment industry as an advertisement model for Johnson & Johnson. She made her acting debut in television series Our Heaven in 1992. She then continued to play supporting roles in Scent of Love (1994) and General Hospital (1994) and Love is Blue (1995), but struggled to receive any significant attention. In 1995, she gained some recognition after playing the heroine's younger sister in KBS2's hit drama Our Sunny Days of Youth, which recorded its highest viewership rating of 62.7 percent. The drama's director, Jeon San PD, made a remark stating that Jeon Do-yeon is a "tough and ambitious newcomer". The following years, she played major roles in multiple dramas such as Project, Way Station and Until We Can Love in 1996, and Star in My Heart in 1997. Jeon spent five years starring in television dramas before achieving instant star status with her feature film debut acting alongside Han Suk-kyu in 1997 film The Contact, which became the second-highest grossing Korean film of that year. She won numerous awards through the work, including Best New Actress at the 35th Grand Bell Awards and 18th Blue Dragon Film Awards.

=== 1997–2006: Critical acclaim and success ===
From 1997 after the success of The Contact, Jeon emerged as a prominent actress in the Korean film industry and went on to establish a reputation as a "chameleon" who can take on a wide variety of roles, from her performance as a doctor in the hit melodrama A Promise, which won her Best Actress at the 35th Baeksang Arts Awards, to that of a schoolgirl in the 1999 film The Harmonium in My Memory, then a wife having an adulterous affair in the 1999 film Happy End. In 1999 and 2000, she received Best Actress awards at numerous award ceremonies such as the 20th Blue Dragon Film Awards and the 37th Grand Bell Awards for her performance in The Harmonium in My Memory. She also won Best Actress at the 35th Baeksang Arts Awards for her role in A Promise and several other local film awards for her role in Happy End.

In 2001, she played a bank teller in Park Heung-sik's directorial debut I Wish I Had a Wife. After starring as the tough-talking Soo-jin in Ryoo Seung-wan's No Blood No Tears in 2002, Jeon spent time acting in the television series Shoot for the Stars. In 2003, she found box-office success in E J-yong's Untold Scandal, an adaptation of the famous French novel Dangerous Liaisons set in Joseon. The following year, she reunited with director Park Heung-sik in a dual role for the time-bending melodrama film My Mother, the Mermaid.

In 2005, Jeon played a prostitute who contracts AIDS in Park Jin-pyo's hard-hitting melodrama You Are My Sunshine. The film was a box-office hit, and her performance received critical acclaim and won her numerous acting awards. She then returned to the small screen with Lovers in Prague, a drama that tells the love story between the president's daughter and an ordinary detective. The drama was a huge success, with average viewership ratings of over 27 percent. For the work, Jeon won the Grand Prize (Daesang) at 2005 SBS Drama Awards. Commenting on her successful year, The Korea Herald noted, "It is rare for a movie and a drama with the same leading actor or actress to become major hits at the same time. And often, actors and actresses avoid such cases, due to the risk of confusing audiences, but Jeon managed to pull both roles off perfectly without causing any confusion in the audience."

=== 2007–2014: Secret Sunshine and international acclaim ===
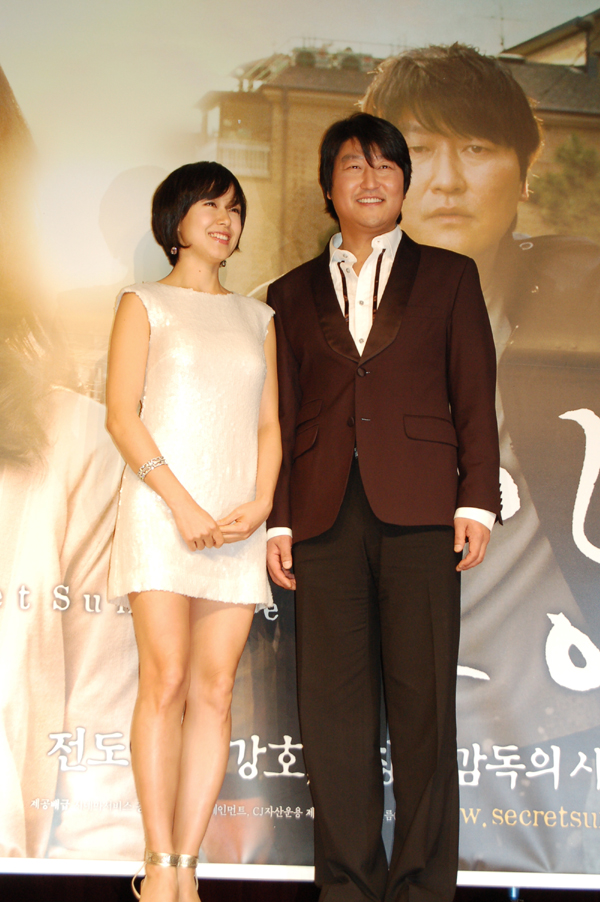
Jeon with co-star Song Kang-ho at Secret Sunshine press conference in 2007

In 2007, Jeon starred in Lee Chang-dong's melodrama Secret Sunshine, which propelled her to international recognition. Her fierce and fearless portrayal of a widowed mother who struggles to rearrange her life after the tragic deaths of her husband and son received universal critical acclaim. Although the film itself, which debuted at the 60th Cannes Film Festival, evoked widely differing assessments from international critics, Jeon's performance was universally praised, and she was chosen as the Best Actress by the Cannes jury, making her the first Korean ever to receive an acting award at Cannes. She also won Best Performance by an Actress at the 1st Asia Pacific Screen Awards. Following the heel of the Cannes' win, Jeon went on to sweep domestic awards, winning Best Actress at multiple film award ceremonies such as the 28th Blue Dragon Film Awards. In recognition of her contribution to the development of the Korean film industry, she was honored with the Okgwan Order of Cultural Merit by the Ministry of Culture, Sports and Tourism and the Special Achievement Award at the 44th Grand Bell Awards.

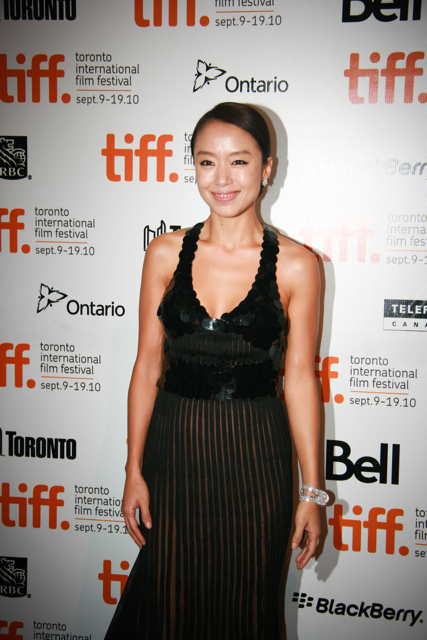
Jeon at the 2010 Toronto International Film Festival

Post-Cannes, she starred in 2008 film My Dear Enemy, playing an unemployed single woman who reacquaints herself with her ex-boyfriend. After starring in My Dear Enemy, Jeon gave birth to a daughter and rested for a while. In October 2009, she was honored by the French government with the Chevalier des Arts et Lettres medal for her contribution to the arts. The following year, she returned to star in Im Sang-soo's 2010 controversial remake The Housemaid. Jeon came back to Cannes once again as the film was chosen to compete for the Palme d'Or at the 63rd Cannes Film Festival.

In 2011, Jeon played a female con artist who risks her life for ten days for a final deal with a cold-hearted debt collector in Countdown. Countdown premiered at the 36th Toronto International Film Festival.

In 2013, after a two-year break, Jeon returned with Bang Eun-jin's Way Back Home, a film based on the true story of a housewife who was imprisoned for two years on the island of Martinique after being wrongly arrested for drug smuggling at Paris's Orly Airport in 2004.

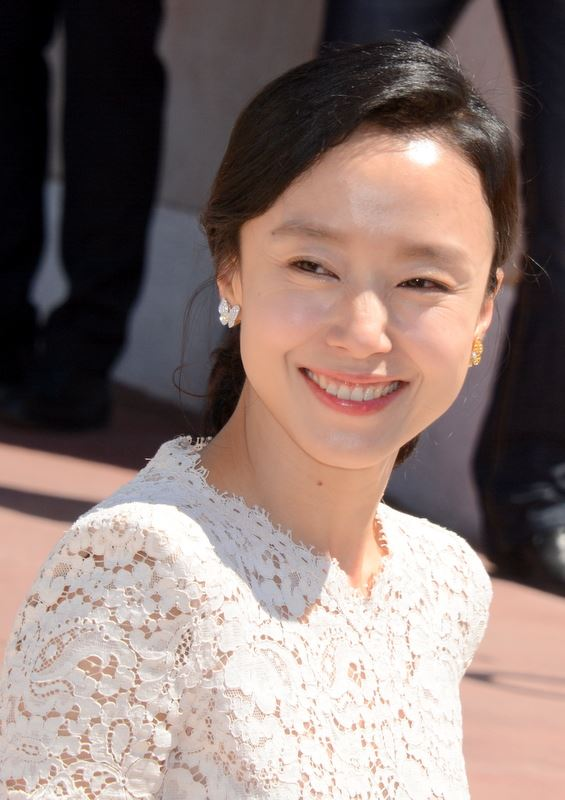
Jeon at the 2014 Cannes Film Festival

In 2014, she was announced as one of the nine panel members of the main competition jury at the 67th Cannes Film Festival, making her the first Korean actor or actress to receive the honor and the second Korean after director Lee Chang-dong in 2009.

=== 2015–present: Further acclaim and return to the small screen ===
In 2015, Jeon starred in The Shameless, a thriller that explores the unexpected and carnal attraction that develops between a detective and the girlfriend of the murderer that he investigates. The film was selected for the Un Certain Regard section at the 68th Cannes Film Festival and Jeon returned to Cannes for the fourth time in her career. For her performance in the film, Jeon won Best Actress at the 24th Buil Film Awards, the 15th Director's Cut Awards, and the 52nd Baeksang Arts Awards respectively. The same year, she played a blind swordswoman in the Goryeo-set revenge period drama Memories of the Sword, her third collaboration with Park Heung-sik and her second with Lee Byung-hun.

This was followed by Jeon's second film with director Lee Yoon-ki, A Man and a Woman, a 2016 film about a forbidden romance that takes place in the snow-swept landscape of Finland. Jeon then made a return to the small screen after twelve years in the 2016 Korean remake of the American legal drama The Good Wife. She was praised for displaying a wide range of emotions and agony of a housewife who is forced to become a lawyer again after her husband is mired in a scandal and put behind bars.

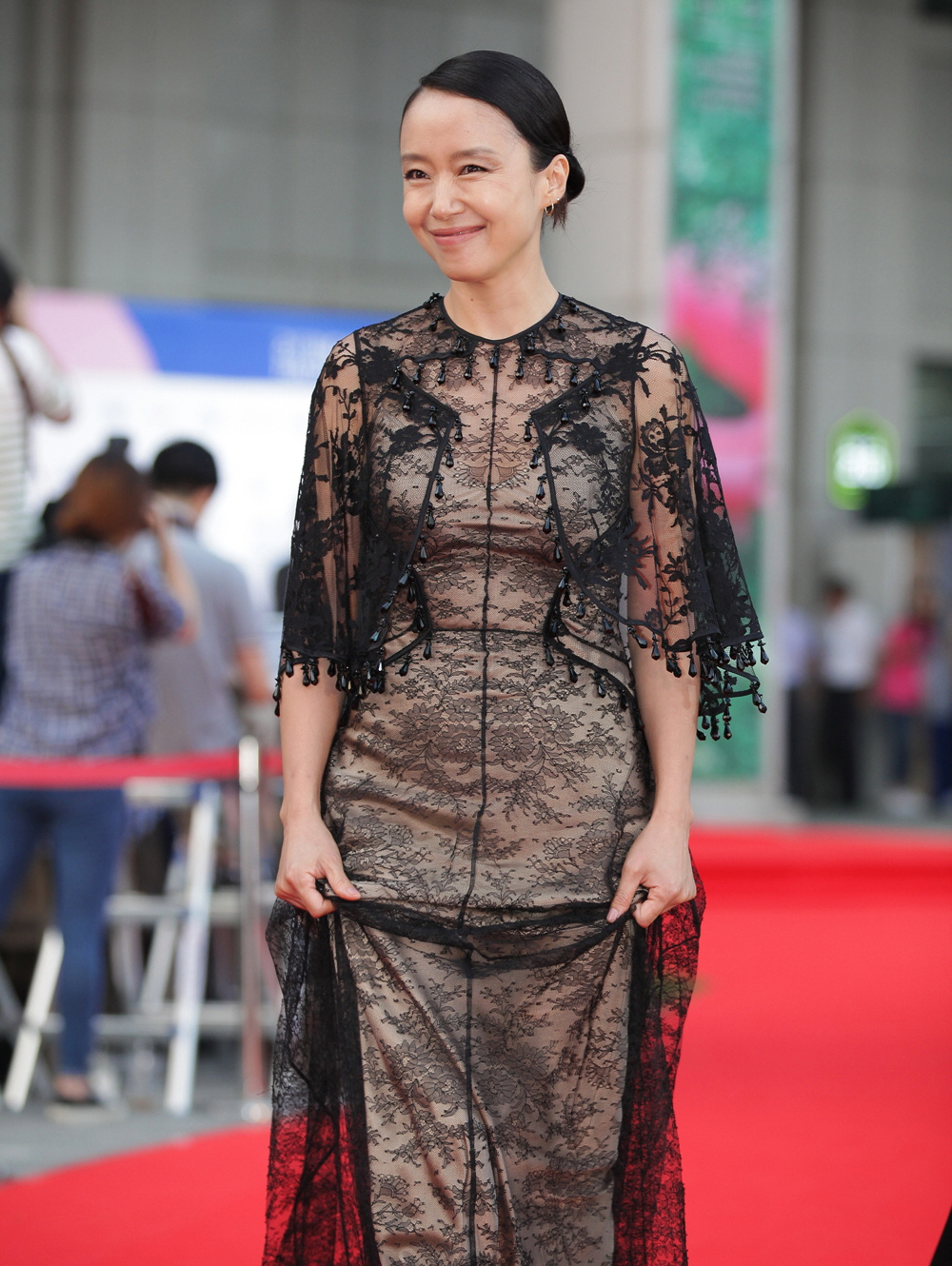
Jeon walking the 2017 Bucheon International Fantastic Film Festival red carpet.

After a three-year break, Jeon reunited with Sul Kyung-gu in drama film Birthday, marking her second collaboration with Sol eighteen years after I Wish I Had a Wife. The film, inspired by the Sewol ferry disaster, deals with the struggles faced by a couple who lost their son in a tragic accident. The film had its international premiere at the 2019 Far East Film Festival in Udine, Italy. At the festival, Jeon was honored with Golden Mulberry Lifetime Achievement Award. She once again won Best Actress at the 56th Baeksang Arts Awards, the 6th Korean Film Producers Association Awards and 28th Buil Film Awards for her performance in the film.

In early 2020, Jeon starred in Beasts Clawing at Straws, a mystery thriller based on Keisuke Sone's novel, alongside Jung Woo-sung. The film was screened at the 49th International Film Festival Rotterdam and won the Special Jury Award in the Tiger Competition. The film failed to turn a profit as local box office sales plummeted due to the COVID-19 pandemic.

She made her small-screen comeback in Hur Jin-ho's first television series project Lost which premiered on JTBC in September 2021. In 2022, she reunited with Song Kang-ho and Lee Byung-hun in Han Jae-rim's disaster action film Emergency Declaration.

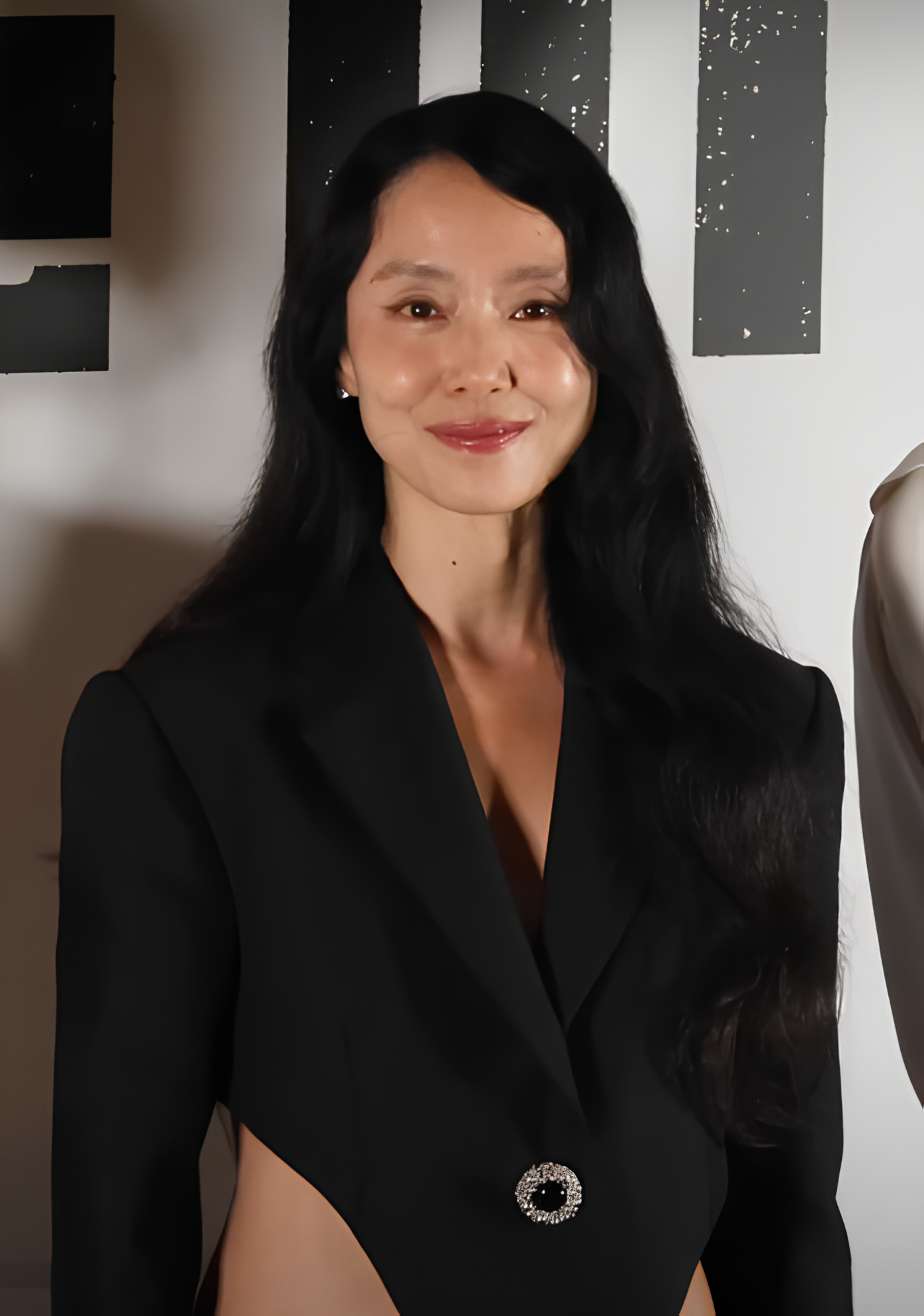
Jeon at the press conference for the film Revolver in 2024

In 2023, Jeon acts opposite Jung Kyung-ho in tvN-broadcast Netflix-distributed romantic comedy series Crash Course in Romance directed by Yoo Je-won, which marked her return to romance genre in 17 years. She played the role of a former national handball player who now runs a banchan shop, raising her high school daughter alone. According to Good Data Corporation, (Note: Good Data Corporation (굿데이터코퍼레이션은) is an online public opinion analysis service. It analyzes online information and public opinion by field, and provides TV topical broadcasting program, online topic ranking, and quality evaluation of performers and marketing effect analysis. TV topicality survey target series that were being aired or scheduled to be broadcast. Unlike the audience rating, which measures only the viewing time for the broadcast time, TV topicality is to diagnose the evaluation by examining, indexing, and analyzing the netizens' reactions that appeared in online news, blogs, communities, social media, and videos for one week after each program was broadcast.) series Crash Course in Romance ranked first with a topical share of 23.8% in Top 10 of TV Topicality Ranking in drama division category in four weeks in a row. Jung Kyung-ho ranked first in the performer category for five consecutive weeks, while Jeon ranked 3rd.

In the same year, Jeon stars in Netflix crime action film Kill Boksoon in the title role, as a professional assassin, opposite Sul Kyung-gu, Esom, and Koo Kyo-hwan. Directed and written by Byun Sung-hyun, it is slated to release on Netflix on March 31, 2023.

In 2024, Jeon returned to the stage in Simon Stone's production of The Cherry Orchard opposite Park Hae-soo at the LG Arts Center in Seoul to critical acclaim. Jeon later toured with the production to Busan, Singapore, Hong Kong, Adelaide, and New York City.

== Personal life ==
Jeon married businessman and professional car racer Kang Shi-kyu, who is nine years her senior, in a private wedding ceremony at Shilla Hotel on March 11, 2007. She gave birth to a daughter on January 22, 2009.

== Filmography ==
=== Film ===
Film appearances
Year	Title	Role	Notes	Ref.
1997	The Contact	Soo-hyun		
1998	A Promise	Chae Hee-ju		
1999	The Harmonium in My Memory	Yun Hong-yeon		
1999	Happy End	Choi Bo-ra		
2001	I Wish I Had a Wife	Jung Won-ju		
2002	No Blood No Tears	Soo-jin		
2003	Untold Scandal	Lady Jeong		
2004	My Mother, the Mermaid	Kim Na-young / Jo Yeon-soon		
2005	You Are My Sunshine	Eun-ha		
2007	Secret Sunshine	Lee Shin-ae		
2008	My Dear Enemy	Hee-soo		
2010	The Housemaid	Eun-yi		
2011	Countdown	Cha Ha-yeon		
2013	Way Back Home	Song Jeong-yeon		
2015	The Shameless	Kim Hye-kyung		
2015	Memories of the Sword	Seol-rang / Wol-so		
2016	A Man and a Woman	Sang-min		
2019	Birthday	Soon-nam		
2019	Ashfall	Sun-hwa	Cameo	
2020	Beasts Clawing at Straws	Yeon-hee		
2021	Emergency Declaration	Minister Kim Sook-hee		
2023	Kill Boksoon	Gil Bok-soon		
2024	Revolver	Ha Soo-yeong		
2025	Mantis	Gil Bok-soon	Cameo	
2025	Good News	First Lady of South Korea	Cameo	
2026	Possible Love	Ahn Mi-ok		

=== Television ===
Television series appearances
Year	Title	Role	Notes	Ref.
1992–1993	Our Paradise	Soo-hyun		
1994	Scent of Love	Hye-jin		
1994	General Hospital	Kang Soon-young		
1995	Love is Blue	Na Hye-jin		
1995	Drama Game: "Six Steps Towards Separation"	Park Joon-young	One-act play	
1995	Our Sunny Days of Youth	Im Jong-hee		
1996	Project	Yoo Hyun-jung		
1996	Drama Game: "Can I Go to the Post Office to Find a Lost Love?"	Jong-hee	One-act play	
1996	Way Station	Choi Kye-soon		
1996	Until We Can Love	Eun-ju		
1997	Star in My Heart	Yang Soon-ae		
1997	Snail	Yang Sun-ja		
1998	MBC Best Theater: "What You Cherish Can Never Be Forgotten"	Se-jin	One-act play	
2002–2003	Shoot for the Stars	Han So-ra		
2005	Lovers in Prague	Yoon Jae-hee		
2008	On Air	Herself	Cameo (episode 2)	
2016	The Good Wife	Kim Hye-kyung		
2021	Lost	Bu-jeong		
2023	Crash Course in Romance	Nam Haeng-seon		
2025	The Price of Confession	Ahn Yoon-soo		

=== Music video appearances ===
Year	Song title	Singer	Ref.
2002	"The Name"	The Name	

== Stage ==
=== Musical ===
List of musical play
Year	Title	Role	Theater	Date	Ref.
1998	The Queen of Opera Tears (눈물의 여왕)	Shin Jung-ha	Seoul Arts Center Opera House	March 27 to April 12	

=== Theater ===
List of theater play
Year	Title	Role	Theater	Date	Ref.
1997	Educating Rita	Rita	Daehak-ro Skyland Small Theater Hall 2	February 19	
2024–2026	The Cherry Orchard (벚꽃동산)	Lady Ranevskaya	LG Arts Center SEOUL	June 4 to July 7, 2024	
2024–2026	The Cherry Orchard (벚꽃동산)	Lady Ranevskaya	Busan Cultural Center	March 13–15, 2025	
2024–2026	The Cherry Orchard (벚꽃동산)	Lady Ranevskaya	Hong Kong Cultural Centre	September 19–21, 2025	
2024–2026	The Cherry Orchard (벚꽃동산)	Lady Ranevskaya	Esplanade – Theatres on the Bay	November 7–9, 2025	
2024–2026	The Cherry Orchard (벚꽃동산)	Lady Ranevskaya	Adelaide Festival Centre	February 27 to March 1, 2026	
2024–2026	The Cherry Orchard (벚꽃동산)	Lady Ranevskaya	Park Avenue Armory	September 16-26, 2026	

== Accolades ==
=== Awards and nominations ===
Year	Award	Category	Nominated work	Result	Ref.
1994	SBS Drama Awards	Best New Actress	Scent of Love	Nominated	
1995	KBS Drama Awards	Popularity Award	Our Sunny Days of Youth	Won	
1996	KBS Drama Awards	Popularity Award	Until We Fall in Love	Nominated	
1997	35th Grand Bell Awards	Best New Actress	The Contact	Won	
1997	18th Blue Dragon Film Awards	Best Leading Actress	The Contact	Nominated	
1997	18th Blue Dragon Film Awards	Best New Actress	The Contact	Won	
1998	34th Baeksang Arts Awards	Best New Actress – Film	The Contact	Nominated	
1998	34th Baeksang Arts Awards	Most Popular Actress – Film	The Contact	Won	
1998	18th Korean Association of Film Critics Awards	Best New Actress	The Contact	Won	
1998	19th Blue Dragon Film Awards	Best Leading Actress	A Promise	Nominated	
1999	35th Baeksang Arts Awards	Best Actress – Film	A Promise	Won	
1999	36th Grand Bell Awards	Best Actress	A Promise	Nominated	
1999	1st Asian Film Critics Association Awards	Best Actress	A Promise	Won	
1999	22nd Golden Cinematography Awards	Most Popular Actress	A Promise	Won	
1999	Cine 21 Awards	Best Actress	The Harmonium in My Memory, Happy End	Won	
1999	20th Blue Dragon Film Awards	Best Leading Actress	The Harmonium in My Memory	Won	
1999	20th Blue Dragon Film Awards	Popular Star Award	The Harmonium in My Memory	Won	
1999	2nd Director's Cut Awards	Best Actress	The Harmonium in My Memory, Happy End	Won	
2000	36th Baeksang Arts Awards	Best Actress – Film	Happy End	Nominated	
2000	37th Grand Bell Awards	Best Actress	The Harmonium in My Memory	Won	
2000	37th Grand Bell Awards	Best Actress	Happy End	Nominated	
2000	8th Chunsa Film Art Awards	Best Actress	Happy End	Won	
2000	1st Busan Film Critics Awards	Best Actress	Happy End	Won	
2000	20th Korean Association of Film Critics Awards	Best Actress	Happy End	Won	
2000	21st Blue Dragon Film Awards	Best Leading Actress	Happy End	Nominated	
2000	21st Blue Dragon Film Awards	Popular Star Award	Happy End	Won	
2001	37th Baeksang Arts Awards	Best Actress – Film	I Wish I Had a Wife	Won	
2001	38th Grand Bell Awards	Best Actress	I Wish I Had a Wife	Nominated	
2001	22nd Blue Dragon Film Awards	Best Leading Actress	I Wish I Had a Wife	Nominated	
2002	23rd Blue Dragon Film Awards	Best Leading Actress	No Blood No Tears	Nominated	
2002	23rd Blue Dragon Film Awards	Popular Star Award	No Blood No Tears	Won	
2002	1st Korean Film Awards	Best Actress	No Blood No Tears	Nominated	
2002	SBS Drama Awards	Top Excellence Award, Actress	Shoot for the Stars	Won	
2002	SBS Drama Awards	Top 10 Stars	Shoot for the Stars	Won	
2003	24th Blue Dragon Film Awards	Best Leading Actress	Untold Scandal	Nominated	
2003	2nd Korean Film Awards	Best Actress	Untold Scandal	Nominated	
2004	40th Baeksang Arts Awards	Best Actress – Film	Untold Scandal	Nominated	
2004	41st Grand Bell Awards	Best Actress	Untold Scandal	Nominated	
2004	25th Blue Dragon Film Awards	Best Actress	My Mother, the Mermaid	Nominated	
2004	3rd Korean Film Awards	Best Actress	My Mother, the Mermaid	Won	
2004	7th Director's Cut Awards	Best Actress	My Mother, the Mermaid	Won	
2004	Cine 21 Awards	Best Actress	My Mother, the Mermaid	Won	
2005	41st Baeksang Arts Awards	Best Actress – Film	My Mother, the Mermaid	Nominated	
2005	13th Chunsa Film Art Awards	Best Actress	My Mother, the Mermaid	Won	
2005	42nd Grand Bell Awards	Best Actress	My Mother, the Mermaid	Nominated	
2005	25th Korean Association of Film Critics Awards	Best Actress	You Are My Sunshine	Won	
2005	26th Blue Dragon Film Awards	Best Actress	You Are My Sunshine	Nominated	
2005	26th Blue Dragon Film Awards	Best Couple Award (with Hwang Jung-min)	You Are My Sunshine	Won	
2005	4th Korean Film Awards	Best Actress	You Are My Sunshine	Won	
2005	6th Women in Film Korea Awards	Best Actress	You Are My Sunshine	Won	
2005	Cine 21 Awards	Best Actress	You Are My Sunshine	Won	
2005	8th Director's Cut Awards	Best Actress	You Are My Sunshine	Won	
2005	SBS Drama Awards	Grand Prize (Daesang)	Lovers in Prague	Won	
2005	SBS Drama Awards	Top Excellence Award, Actress	Lovers in Prague	Nominated	
2005	SBS Drama Awards	Top 10 Stars	Lovers in Prague	Won	
2006	3rd Max Movie Awards	Best Actress	You Are My Sunshine	Won	
2006	42nd Baeksang Arts Awards	Best Actress – Film	You Are My Sunshine	Nominated	
2006	43rd Grand Bell Awards	Best Actress	You Are My Sunshine	Won	
2007	60th Cannes Film Festival	Best Actress	Secret Sunshine	Won	
2007	2nd Asia-Pacific Producers Network Awards	Asian Movie Artist Award	Secret Sunshine	Won	
2007	44th Grand Bell Awards	Special Achievement Award	Secret Sunshine	Won	
2007	Ministry of Culture, Sports and Tourism	Okgwan Order of Cultural Merit	Secret Sunshine	Won	
2007	1st Asia Pacific Screen Awards	Best Actress	Secret Sunshine	Won	
2007	28th Blue Dragon Film Awards	Best Actress	Secret Sunshine	Won	
2007	28th Blue Dragon Film Awards	Best Dressed	—N/a	Won	
2007	27th Korean Association of Film Critics Awards	Best Actress	Secret Sunshine	Won	
2007	7th Proud Korean Awards	Recipient (for Movie category)	Secret Sunshine	Won	
2007	6th Korean Film Awards	Best Actress	Secret Sunshine	Won	
2007	8th Women in Film Korea Awards	Best Actress	Secret Sunshine	Won	
2007	10th Director's Cut Awards	Best Actress	Secret Sunshine	Won	
2007	Cine 21 Awards	Best Actress	Secret Sunshine	Won	
2007	3rd University Film Festival of Korea	Best Actress	Secret Sunshine	Won	
2008	2nd Asian Film Awards	Best Actress	Secret Sunshine	Won	
2008	10th Asian Film Critics Association Awards	Best Actress	Secret Sunshine	Won	
2008	44th Baeksang Arts Awards	Best Actress – Film	Secret Sunshine	Nominated	
2008	45th Grand Bell Awards	Best Actress	Secret Sunshine	Nominated	
2009	Andre Kim Best Star Awards	Super Artist Award	—N/a	Won	
2009	12th Director's Cut Awards	Cinema Angel recipient	—N/a	Recipient	
2010	Village Voice Film Poll	Best Actress	Secret Sunshine	5th place	
2010	IndieWire Critics Poll	Best Actress	Secret Sunshine	7th place	
2010	47th Grand Bell Awards	Best Actress	The Housemaid	Nominated	
2010	Cinemanila International Film Festival	Best Actress	The Housemaid	Won	
2010	31st Blue Dragon Film Awards	Best Actress	The Housemaid	Nominated	
2010	8th Korean Film Awards	Best Actress	The Housemaid	Nominated	
2011	2nd Seoul Art and Culture Awards	Best Actress	The Housemaid	Won	
2011	31st Fantasporto Director's Week	Best Actress	The Housemaid	Won	
2011	5th Asian Film Awards	Best Actress	The Housemaid	Nominated	
2011	5th Asian Film Awards	People's Choice Award for Favorite Actress	The Housemaid	Won	
2011	8th International Cinephile Society Awards	Best Actress	Secret Sunshine	Nominated	
2014	5th KOFRA Film Awards	Best Actress	Way Back Home	Won	
2014	9th Max Movie Awards	Best Actress	Way Back Home	Won	
2014	19th Chunsa Film Art Awards	Best Actress	Way Back Home	Nominated	
2014	50th Baeksang Arts Awards	Best Actress – Film	Way Back Home	Nominated	
2014	23rd Buil Film Awards	Best Actress	Way Back Home	Nominated	
2014	51st Grand Bell Awards	Best Actress	Way Back Home	Nominated	
2014	35th Blue Dragon Film Awards	Best Actress	Way Back Home	Nominated	
2015	36th Blue Dragon Film Awards	Best Actress	The Shameless	Nominated	
2015	Jecheon International Music & Film Festival	Best Actress	The Shameless	Won	
2015	17th Asian Film Critics Association Awards	Best Actress	The Shameless	Nominated	
2015	24th Buil Film Awards	Best Actress	The Shameless	Won	
2015	35th Korean Association of Film Critics Awards	Best Actress	The Shameless	Nominated	
2015	15th Director's Cut Awards	Best Actress	The Shameless	Won	
2015	Cine 21 Awards	Best Actress	The Shameless	Won	
2016	7th KOFRA Film Awards	Best Actress	The Shameless	Won	
2016	21st Chunsa Film Art Awards	Best Actress	The Shameless	Nominated	
2016	52nd Baeksang Arts Awards	Best Actress – Film	The Shameless	Won	
2016	1st Asia Artist Awards	Grand Prize (Daesang)	The Good Wife	Nominated	
2019	Far East Film Festival	Lifetime Achievement Award	—N/a	Recipient	
2019	40th Blue Dragon Film Awards	Best Actress	Birthday	Nominated	
2019	28th Buil Film Awards	Best Actress	Birthday	Won	
2019	6th Korean Film Producers Association Awards	Best Actress	Birthday	Won	
2020	56th Grand Bell Awards	Best Actress	Birthday	Nominated	
2020	56th Baeksang Arts Awards	Best Actress – Film	Birthday	Won	
2020	29th Buil Film Awards	Best Actress	Beasts Clawing at Straws	Nominated	
2021	41st Blue Dragon Film Awards	Best Actress	Beasts Clawing at Straws	Nominated	
2021	26th Chunsa Film Art Awards	Best Actress	Beasts Clawing at Straws	Won	
2022	Director's Cut Awards	Best Actress in series	Lost	Nominated	
2022	31st Buil Film Awards	Best Actress	Emergency Declaration	Nominated	
2023	59th Baeksang Arts Awards	Best Actress – Film	Kill Boksoon	Nominated	
2023	32nd Buil Film Awards	Best Actress	Kill Boksoon	Nominated	
2023	9th APAN Star Awards	Top Excellence Award, Actress in a Miniseries	Crash Course in Romance	Nominated	
2023	FUNdex Awards	Best of TV Drama Actress	Crash Course in Romance	Nominated	
2024	33rd Buil Film Awards	Best Actress	Revolver	Nominated	
2024	45th Blue Dragon Film Awards	Best Actress	Revolver	Nominated	
2024	25th Busan Film Critics Awards	Best Actress	Revolver	Won	
2025	61st Baeksang Arts Awards	Best Actress – Film	Revolver	Won	
2026	46th Korean Association of Film Critics Awards	Best Actress	Possible Love	Won	
2026	47th Blue Dragon Film Awards	Best Actress	Possible Love	Pending	
2026	36th Gotham Film Awards	Outstanding Lead Performance	Possible Love	Pending	

=== State honors ===
Name of country, award ceremony, year given, and name of honor
Country	Award Ceremony	Year	Honor	Ref.
France	Busan International Film Festival – the French Night (Note: Annual Event held at Busan International Film Festival by French Embassy in South Korea)	2009	Ordre des Arts et des Lettres Chevalier	

=== Listicles ===
Name of publisher, year listed, name of listicle, and placement
Publisher	Year	Listicle	Placement	Ref.
Cine21	2015	Actress of the Year	1st	
Gallup Korea	2007	Gallup Korea's Film Actor of the Year	1st	
Gallup Korea	2008	Gallup Korea's Film Actor of the Year	4th	
Korean Film Council	2021	Korean Actors 200 (Note: Introduces 200 actors that best represent the present and future of Korean cinema to the people in the film industry all over the world.)	Included	
Sisa Journal	2008	Next Generation Leader — Film Industry	7th	
The Screen	2009	1984–2008 Top Box Office Powerhouse Actors in Korean Movies	15th	
Variety	2007	50 most influential women in the world	Included	
Variety	2007	60 most prominent people to lead the future of the Cannes Festival	Included	
