= Sul Kyung-gu =

South Korean actor (born 1967)

- Sul in 2026
- Born: May 14, 1967 (age 59); Seocheon, South Chungcheong Province, South Korea
- Education: Hanyang University (Theater and Film)
- Occupation: Actor
- Years active: 1993–present
- Agent: C-JeS Studios
- Height: 180 cm (5 ft 11 in)
- Spouses: Unknown (m. 1996; div. 2006) Song Yoon-ah (m. 2009)
- Children: 2

Korean name
- Hangul: 설경구
- Hanja: 薛景求
- RR: Seol Gyeonggu
- MR: Sŏl Kyŏnggu

Sul Kyung-gu (Korean: 설경구; born May 14, 1967) is a South Korean actor. Upon his graduation in 1994, he appeared in numerous theatrical productions, such as the hit Korean adaptation of the German rock musical Subway Line 1, and productions of Sam Shepard's True West and A. R. Gurney's Love Letters.

Sul achieved his breakthrough in film with Lee Chang-dong's Peppermint Candy (1999), the first of several collaborations with the director, followed by Oasis (2002). He also starred in the Public Enemy film series (2002–2008) for which he won the Baeksang Arts Award Grand Prize, and Silmido (2003) which became the highest-grossing film in South Korea at the time of release. He later won Best Actor at the Baeksang Arts Awards for his performances in Hope (2013) and Kingmaker (2022).

His other notable films include Jail Breakers (2002), Voice of a Murderer (2007), Tidal Wave (2009), The Tower (2012), Cold Eyes and The Spy: Undercover Operation (both 2013), The Merciless (2017), Memoir of a Murderer (2017), and The Book of Fish (2021).

== Early life and education ==
Sul was born in Seocheon, South Chungcheong Province, on May 1, 1968. He is the second son, with one younger sister. He and his family moved to Dohwa-dong, Mapo District, Seoul when his father, who was a civil servant, transferred to the Mapo District Office. Sul attended Mapo Elementary School and then enrolled in Mapo Middle School and Mapo High School.

Sul's parents wanted him to go to an engineering college, thus guaranteeing him a stable job. However, Sul entered the Department of Theater and Film of Hanyang University with the idea of becoming a film director.

== Career ==
=== 1993–1997: Early career ===
Sul studied theater and film at Hanyang University (Class of '86). In May 1993, When Sul was in his 4th year of college, he directed a play for the 1st Young Theatre Festival, The Moon, Moon, The Bright Moon. At that time, Sul planned to enter the 3rd KBS Talent Recruitment, but he had no choice but to give up the recruitment due to his professor's request. He was also active in Dongsung-dong since the second semester of his senior year, including guest directing play Bison, a performance for the drama class at Deoksung Women's University, as a part-time job. Gradually, he naturally gave up his dream of becoming a film director, and debuted in 1993 with the play Simbasame as Sul joined Hanyang Theater Company, a theater company with alumni of the Department of Theater and Film at Hanyang University as the majority of its members.

When Sul was in his 4th year of college, Sul received a full scholarship with straight-A credits and went up to the department at once. Before graduating from Hanyang University, he received invitations from his advisor to study master at Hanyang University graduate school or Korea National University of Arts, but he refused. Sul continued his theatre activities in Hanyang Theater Company, however Sul didn't want to be under the shadow of his school. After graduating, Sul left the company.

In May 1994, Sul asked a college senior who was the head of the planning department at the theater company Hakjeon for a part-time job. He met Kim Min-ki and was cast in the hit Korean adaptation of the German rock musical Subway Line 1. Sul participated in this production from the premiere in 1994 to 1996, playing all but two of the 80 roles, accumulating various experiences and acting skills and achieving great success. In addition, he has been active as a theater actor and musical actor in Daehakro, appearing in plays such as Korean productions of Sam Shepard's True West and musical Mosquito (Musical).

Since 1988, Sul began taking on minor roles in television. On stage, he was a star actor who played 14 roles, but in television dramas, he was just an aspiring actor. In the mid-1990s, Sul began taking on minor roles in feature films. In 1996, Sul made his screen debut in his first film A Petal, playing the role of Woo-ri, a college student who is chasing the whereabouts of the female lead (Lee Jung-hyun), on the recommendation of director Shim Kwang-jin, a college classmate who was taking directing lessons from director Jang Seon-woo.

=== 1998–2002: Career breakthrough ===
In 1997, Sul met Cha Seung-jae, the CEO of Sidus FNH, the producer of the film Girls' Night Out, which was released in 1998. Sul had a minor role, and his name was featured in the credits as an actor. Sul played a cartoonist who spends a night with Yeon (Jin Hee-kyung), a hotel employee in the play, and his acting was short but impressive. He then signed management contracts with Sidus HQ and made his breakthrough, with major roles in Rainbow Trout, Phantom: The Submarine, and The Bird That Stops in the Air (1999).

In early 1999, Sul was selected for the lead role through an audition for director Lee Chang-dong's film Peppermint Candy. Initially, Sul failed in the first audition, but the director's wife, known as the playwright of the production Confession, saw him in the audition film she saw in the living room by chance, and recommended him, saying, "Here's Kim Young-ho", recognizing him as famous.

In addition, director Lee Chang-dong revealed the reason for casting Sul Kyung-gu:

Unlike other actors, I rather liked that he hesitated and said that he had no confidence. He looked weak in charisma with an ordinary mask, but his face was different every time I saw him, and that seemed to enable him to express various colors as well as good and evil, so he was cast.

In film Peppermint Candy, Sul played Kim Yeong-ho, a suicidal man devastated by the two-decades of historical change his country undergoes. After shooting for six months from mid-May to the end of September, the film debuted on October 14 of that year as the opening film at the 4th Busan International Film Festival. The film was acclaimed and Sul received rave reviews. He swept 10 New Actor Awards and Best Actor Awards at the Korean Film Critics Association Award, Chunsa Film Art Awards, Blue Dragon Film Awards, Daejong Awards, and Baeksang Arts Awards.

Sul next appeared in the romantic comedy I Wish I Had a Wife with Jeon Do-yeon in 2001, playing the role of Bong-su, an ordinary old bachelor bank clerk who yearns for romance. Then acted in a Japanese TV drama produced by NHK.

In 2002, Sul starred in three major films. As a violent and unscrupulous police detective in Public Enemy, he won Best Actor at the Grand Bell Awards and Blue Dragon Film Awards respectively. In August, he starred in Lee Chang-dong's acclaimed third film Oasis, which won the Silver Lion for Best Director at the Venice Film Festival. Sul's portrayal of a mildly mentally disabled outcast with sociopathic inclinations won him Best Actor at the Chunsa Film Art Awards, Korean Association of Film Critics Awards, Korean Film Awards, Director's Cut Awards, and 29th Seattle International Film Festival. In November, he acted together with Cha Seung-won in a box office hit Jail Breakers by director Kim Sang-jin.

=== 2003–2011: Success as a box-office actor ===
In 2003, Sul starred in Silmido, directed by Cinema Service founder Kang Woo-suk. The film is based on Baek Dong-ho's 1999 novel of the same name, which in turn is based on the true story of Unit 684. Silmido was the first Korean film in history to surpass 10 million viewers, with a total of 11.081 million admissions. This success earned Sul a spot in the "Ten Million Club (천만클럽)," a term for actors who have starred in a film with over 10 million admissions.

His next role was as the title character in Rikidōzan, about the legendary ethnic Korean pro wrestler who became a national hero in Japan in the 1950s. Sul gained 20 kilograms for the role and also delivered 95% of his lines in Japanese. Although his performance was acclaimed, the film vastly underperformed on its local release.

In 2005, Sul starred in the sequel Another Public Enemy, which surpassed the original film in box office gross. A second sequel, Public Enemy Returns followed in 2008. Both films were directed by Kang Woo-suk. In October 2005, Sul played the role of the male protagonist Andy in A. R. Gurney's Love Letters by the theatre company Hanyang Repertory. It was directed Professor Choi Hyung-in, his acting teacher. It was his comeback onstage for the first time in years since his latest the musical Subway Line 1.

His next role was in Yoon Je-kyun's 2009 film Haeundae (2009). Sul played Man-sik, a local from Busan's Haeundae District who, years earlier, unexpectedly lost the father of Yeon-hee (Ha Ji-won), during the 2004 tsunami. For his performance, Sul won the Grand Prize at the 2009 Korean Culture and Entertainment Awards. Haeundae also became a massive box office success, attracting 11.083 million viewers. This made Sul the first actor to have two films as actor of the "Ten Million Club."

He went on to win the Best Actor award at the 18th Chunsa Film Art Awards for his performance in 2010 film No Mercy. His other films The Tower (2012) and Cold Eyes (2013) have also been box office hits.

=== 2012–2015: Career resurgence ===
Sul Kyung-gu returned to the big screen after about a year and a half with the disaster film The Tower in December 2012. In 2013, Sul appeared in three movies, Cold Eyes, The Spy: Undercover Operation, and Hope and mobilised a total of 1681 million viewers in 2013. He ranked 2nd after Song Kang-ho in the box office actor. In director Lee Jun-ik's family drama Hope, which is based on the child sexual assault case known as the Cho Doo-soon case, Sul played the role of Dong-hoon, expressing the desperate need of a father to watch his daughter's pain and suffering, and resonating with the audience. He received favorable reviews for his excellent acting, and won the Best Actor at the 50th Baeksang Arts Awards.

In a media interview, director Lee Jun-ik commented on Sul:

He was a very respectable actor. Before filming, he came to the scene with a lot of emotion and only looked at the wall, but when the filming started, he poured out his emotions terribly. Because of Sul Kyung-gu, he was able to complete 'Wish'. He is a great learner.

The following year, Sul starred in My Dictator, as an aspiring actor who is forced to impersonate North Korean leader. For his performance in My Dictator, he won Best Actor at the 35th Golden Cinematography Awards.

Sul began teaching acting in 2014 at his alma mater Hanyang University, as an adjunct professor in the College of Performing Arts.

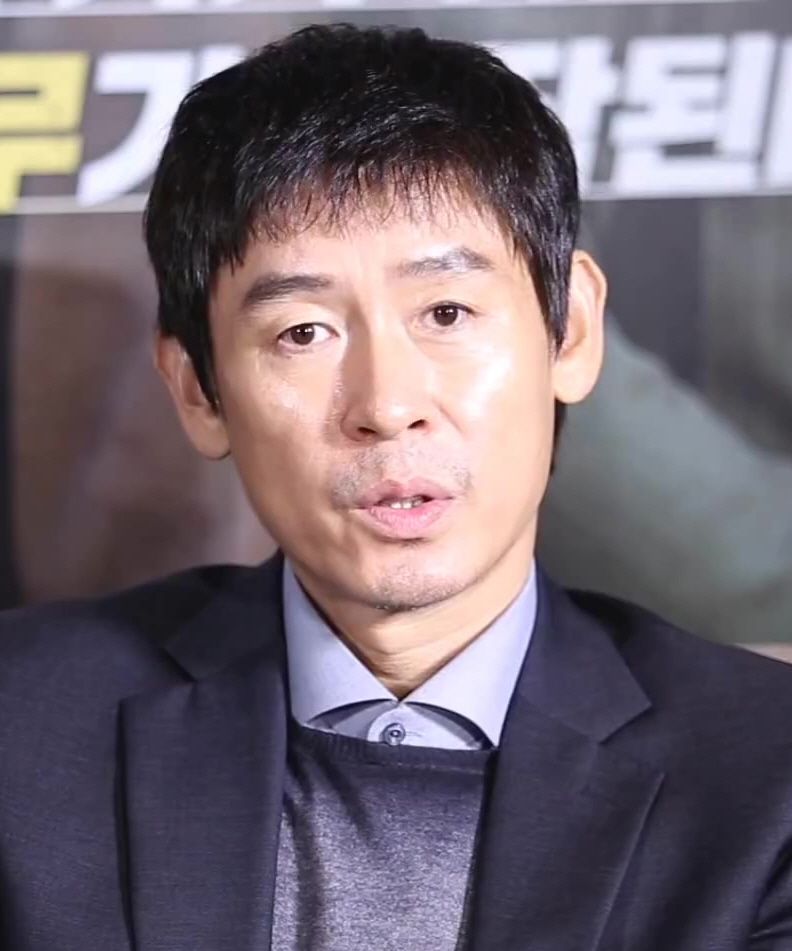
Sol in 2015

In 2015, Sul starred in the war drama film The Long Way Home alongside Yeo Jin-goo. Sul played the role of Jang Nam-bok, a farmer who is suddenly dragged to the battlefield with a newborn baby in the war film Western Front, the directorial debut of playwright Cheon Seong-il. The film depicts the story of the confrontation between Jang Nam-bok of the South Korean Army and Kim Yeong-gwang (Yeo Jin-goo) of the North Korean Army ahead of the armistice agreement in July 1953. With this film, he took on the role of a soldier for the third time following the previous films Peppermint Candy and Silmido.

=== 2017–2022: Film comeback and other ventures ===
In 2017, Sul starred opposite Yim Si-wan in The Merciless. It was shown out of competition in the Midnight Screenings section at the 70th Cannes Film Festival on May 24, 2017. The film brought Sul to win Best Actor awards at the 54th Grand Bell Awards and 37th Korean Association of Film Critics Awards. He next starred in thriller film Memoir of a Murderer, as a retired serial killer with Alzheimer's disease. For his performance in Memoir of a Murderer, Sul received Best Actor awards at the 17th Director's Cut Awards in 2017 and the 9th Korea Film Reporters Association Film Awards (KOFRA) in 2018. The release of Sul's third film in 2017, I Want to Know Your Parents, has been postponed indefinitely following the scandal of actor Oh Dal-su.

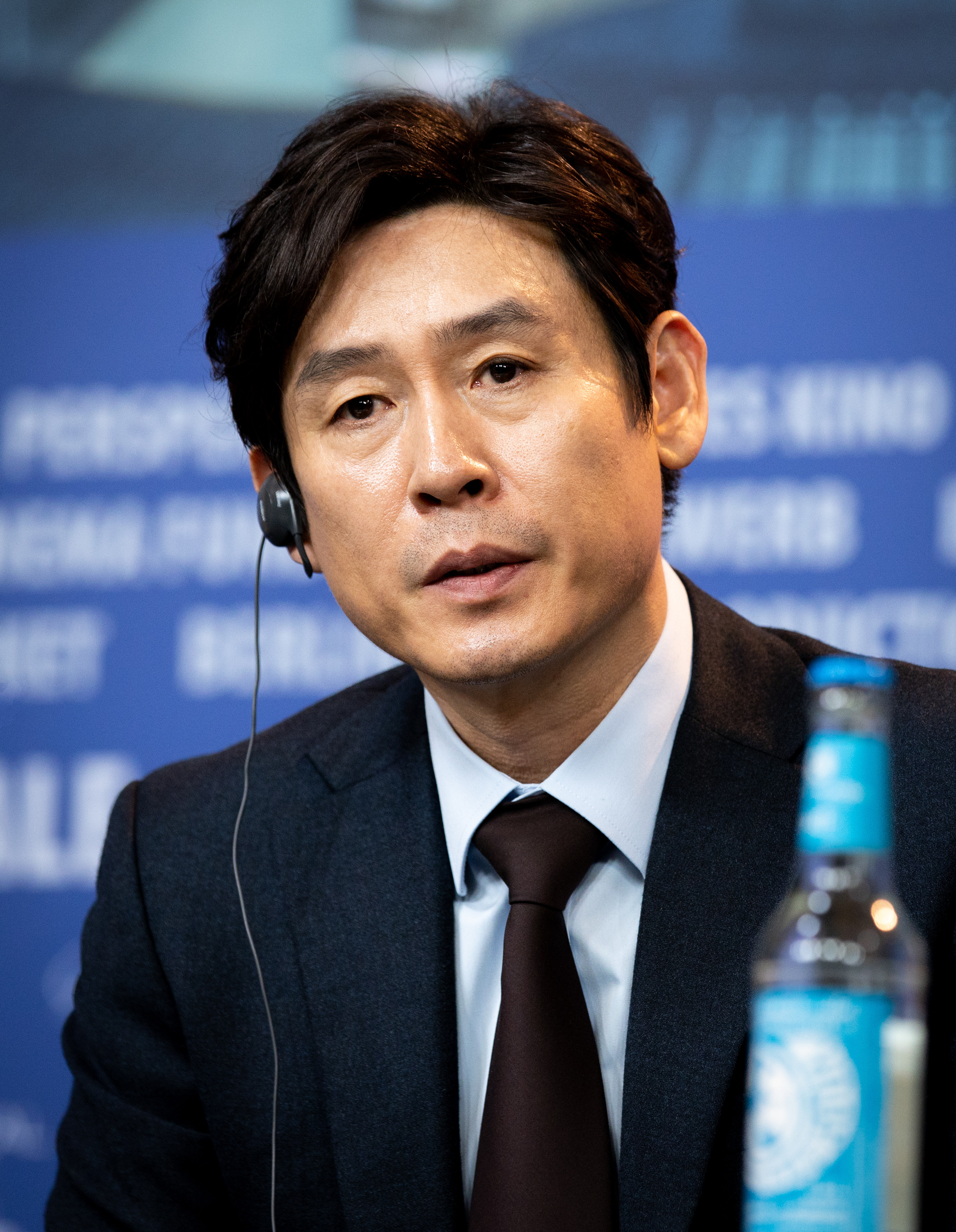
Sul in 2019

Sul next starred in a 2019 film Idol opposite Han Suk-kyu and Chun Woo-hee, which opened in March. Despite the solid acting by three senior actors, Idol received mix reviews. In April 2019, Sul reunited with Jeon Do-yeon, eighteen years after I Wish I Had a Wife, in the film Birthday. The film, inspired by the Sinking of MV Sewol tragedy, deals with the struggles faced by a couple who lose their son in a tragic accident. The film had its international premiere at the 2019 Far East Film Festival in Udine. The same year, Sul starred in the human comedy film Man to Men with Cho Jin-woong.

Sul has reunited with The Merciless director Byun Sung-hyun for the film Kingmaker. It was released in December 2021.

In 2022 Sul was honoured by 26th Bucheon International Fantastic Film Festival by hosting an actor special exhibition 'The Actor, Sul Kyung-gu' focusing on actor Sul Kyung-gu's 29-year acting career along with various events such as the publication of a commemorative booklet entitled 'Sul Kyung-gu is Snow Gyeong-gu', and mega talk during the festival.

=== 2023–present: Streaming series ===
In 2023, Sul reunited once again with director Byun Sung-hyun and Jeon Do-yeon for Netflix action thriller film Kill Boksoon. is a 2023 South Korean. Also starring Kim Si-a, Esom, and Koo Kyo-hwan, the film premiered on Netflix on March 31, 2023.

Returning to the small screen after decades, Sol starred in the political drama series The Whirlwind, which premiered on Netflix on June 28, 2024. This marked his first time in an OTT drama series. He stars opposite Kim Hee-ae. Directed by Park Kyung-soo, directed by Kim Yong-wan, the series features Sol as Park Dong-ho, who serves as Prime Minister, Acting President, and eventually President of South Korea.

In 2025, Sul starred in streaming series Hyper Knife, directed by Kim Jung-hyun and written by Kim Sun-hee. The series explores his complex relationship with her former mentee, played by Park Eun-bin. Disney+ confirmed the release date of the series to be on March 19, 2025. In May 2025, Netflix announced that Sul will be one of the main characters of their new drama The Rat, alongside Ryu Jun-yeol.

== Other activities ==
=== Philanthropy ===
Sul Kyung-gu and his wife Song Yoon-ah, are known for their philanthropic efforts. In July 2010, they covered the entire surgical expenses for a child with congenital heart disease and personally visited her at Seoul St. Mary's Hospital. They later donated ₩100 million through the Korean Committee for UNICEF to assist victims of the sinking of MV Sewol in April 2014. Sul expressed deep sympathy for the tragedy, stating, "I felt indescribable pain witnessing the Sewol ferry disaster. I sincerely wish for recovery." More recently, on February 13, 2023, the couple contributed another ₩50 million to Korea's UNICEF Committee to support children affected by the 2023 Turkey–Syria earthquakes.

== Personal life ==
=== Relationships ===
Sul married Ahn Nae-sang's younger sister in 1996, and they have one daughter together. After four years of separation, they divorced on July 21, 2006. Few years later Sul remarried. He and actress Song Yoon-ah had their wedding ceremony on May 28, 2009, in a Catholic church in Bangbae-dong, followed by a reception at The Ritz-Carlton Hotel Company in Seoul. Both are graduates of Hanyang University and have shared the screen in Jail Breakers (2002) and Lost in Love (2006). Their son, Sul Seung-yoon, was born on August 3, 2010. In 2014, Song Yoon-ah filed a defamation suit against 57 netizens who spread online rumors about an alleged extramarital affair with Sul in 2002 during his first marriage, which reportedly contributed to his divorce in 2006. Both Sul and Song have denied these claims, asserting that their relationship began in 2007.

== Filmography ==
=== Film ===
Year	Title	Role	Note	Ref.
1996	A Petal	Girl's brother		
1996	Love Story	Young-ho		
1998	Girls' Night Out	Gyu-sik	Bit part	
1999	The Bird That Stops in the Air	Kim		
1999	Phantom: The Submarine	Number 432		
1999	Rainbow Trout	Min-soo		
1999	Peppermint Candy	Kim Yong-ho		
2000	The Legend of Gingko	Juk		
2001	I Wish I Had a Wife	Kim Bong-soo		
2002	Public Enemy	Kang Chul-joong		
2002	Oasis	Hong Jong-du		
2002	Jail Breakers	Yoo Jae-pil		
2003	Silmido	Kang In-chan		
2004	Rikidōzan	Rikidōzan / Kim Sin-rak		
2005	Another Public Enemy	Kang Chul-joong		
2006	Lost in Love	Woo-jae		
2006	Cruel Winter Blues	Shim Jae-mun		
2007	Voice of a Murderer	Han Kyung-bae		
2007	Venus and Mars	Kim Sang-min		
2008	Public Enemy Returns	Kang Chul-joong		
2009	Tidal Wave	Choi Man-sik		
2009	Closer to Heaven	Kim Jong-do	Cameo	
2009	A Brand New Life	Jin-hee's father	Cameo	
2010	No Mercy	Kang Min-ho		
2010	Troubleshooter	Kang Tae-sik		
2010	Camellia	Yong-soo	Segment: "Kamome"	
2012	The Tower	Kang Young-ki		
2013	Cold Eyes	Chief Detective Hwang		
2013	The Spy: Undercover Operation	Chul-soo		
2013	Hope	Im Dong-hoon		
2014	My Dictator	Kim Sung-geun		
2015	The Long Way Home	Nam-bok		
2017	Lucid Dream	Bang-seop		
2017	The Merciless	Jae-ho		
2017	Memoir of a Murderer	Byeong-soo		
2017	1987: When the Day Comes	Kim Jeong-nam	Cameo	
2019	Idol	Yoo Joong-sik		
2019	Birthday	Jung-il		
2019	Man of Men	Jang-su		
2021	The Book of Fish	Jeong Yak-jeon		
2022	Kingmaker	Kim Woon-beom		
2022	Yaksha: Ruthless Operations	Kang-in		
2022	I Want to Know Your Parents	Kang Ho-chang		
2022	The Boys	Hwang Jun-cheol		
2023	Phantom	Junji Murayama		
2023	Kill Boksoon	Cha Min-kyu		
2023	The Moon	Kim Jae-guk		
2023	A Normal Family	Yang Jae-wan		
2025	Good News	"Nobody" / Choi Go-myung		
2025	Mantis	Cha Min-kyu	Cameo	
2026	Possible Love	Ho-seok		

=== Television ===
Key
†	Denotes television productions that have not yet been released

Year	Title	Role	Note	Ref.
1994	Oldest Sister	alumni	Morning soap opera	
1995	Puberty	Music Teacher	episodes 111–112	
1995	Korea Gate	Gujeonggil	episode 4	
2001	Prince Shōtoku	Shin Line Musa Lee Jin	Two-part Japanese drama	
2024	The Whirlwind	Park Dong-ho		
2025	Hyper Knife	Choi Deok-hee		
2026	Mousetrap †	No-ja		

=== Music video appearances ===
Year	Song title	Artist
2004	"I Loved You to Death"	SG Wannabe
2015	"How Much Love Do You Have in Your Wallet?"	Park Yoo-chun

== Stage credit ==
=== Musical ===
Musical Performances
Year	Title		Role	Venue
Year	English	Korean	Role	Venue
1986	Porgy and Bess	포기와 베스		
1994–1996	Subway Line 1	지하철 1호선	Multiple roles including withdrawal of mixed-race orphans, spectacles, crackdown squad	Hakjeon Blue Small Theater
1996	Mosquito (Musical)	모스키토	A bakery man, a drunk, a parent singer, a secretary to a member of the National Assembly, and many other roles	Hakjeon Blue Small Theater
1997–1998	Subway Line 1	지하철 1호선	Pointer and many others	Hakjeon Blue Small Theater
2001	Subway Line 1	지하철 1호선	Chulsoo, Passenger, Evangelist and many other roles	Hakjeon Blue Small Theater
2001	Subway Line 1	지하철 1호선	Chulsoo, Passenger, Evangelist and many other roles	April 3–5 Berlin Performance

=== Theater ===
Theater Performances
Year	Title		Role	Note
Year	English	Korean	Role	Note
1993	The Moon, Moon, The Bright Moon	달아 달아 밝은 달아	Production	
1993	Simbasame (Barbara at night and Mary at dawn)	심바새메 (심야에는 바바라와 새벽에는 메리)		Daehangno Information Small Theater
1994	This Song	이런 노래	Son, Jo Gyeong-hoon	Small theater performance at Dongsung-dong Cultural Center
1995–1996	Simbasame (Barbara at night and Mary at dawn)	심바새메 (심야에는 바바라와 새벽에는 메리)	gay alex	Daehangno Information Small Theater
1996	The serpentine groom and his bride	구렁이신랑과 그의 신부		
1996	True West	트루웨스트	Lee	Daehangno Seongjwa small theater performance
2005	Love Letter	러브레터	Andy	Daehangno Hanyang Repertory Theater

== Awards and nominations ==
Year	Award	Category	Nominated work	Result
1999	7th Chunsa Film Art Awards	Best New Actor	Rainbow Trout	Nominated
1999	20th Blue Dragon Film Awards	Best New Actor	Rainbow Trout	Nominated
2000	10th Oslo International Film Festival	Special Mention Award	Peppermint Candy	Won
2000	36th Baeksang Arts Awards	Best New Actor – Film	Peppermint Candy	Won
2000	8th Chunsa Film Art Awards	Best Actor	Peppermint Candy	Won
2000	2nd International Film Festival Bratislava	Best Actor	Peppermint Candy	Won
2000	37th Grand Bell Awards	Best Actor	Peppermint Candy	Nominated
2000	37th Grand Bell Awards	Best New Actor	Peppermint Candy	Won
2000	20th Korean Association of Film Critics Awards	Best New Actor	Peppermint Candy	Won
2000	23rd Golden Cinematography Awards	Best New Actor	Peppermint Candy	Won
2000	21st Blue Dragon Film Awards	Best Leading Actor	Peppermint Candy	Won
2000	Cine 21 Awards	Best Actor	Peppermint Candy, The Legend of Gingko	Won
2002	38th Baeksang Arts Awards	Grand Prize (Daesang) – Film (Note: A Daesang (Korean: 대상), which translates to "Grand Prize", is the highest honor given out at South Korean award ceremonies.)	Public Enemy	Won
2002	38th Baeksang Arts Awards	Best Actor – Film	Public Enemy	Nominated
2002	23rd Blue Dragon Film Awards	Best Leading Actor	Public Enemy	Won
2002	39th Grand Bell Awards	Best Actor	Public Enemy	Won
2002	Cine 21 Awards	Best Actor	Public Enemy, Oasis, Jail Breakers	Won
2002	10th Chunsa Film Art Awards	Best Actor	Oasis	Won
2002	3rd Busan Film Critics Awards	Best Actor	Oasis	Won
2002	22nd Korean Association of Film Critics Awards	Best Actor	Oasis	Won
2002	1st Korean Film Awards	Best Actor	Oasis	Won
2002	5th Director's Cut Awards	Best Actor	Oasis	Won
2003	29th Seattle International Film Festival	Best Actor	Oasis	Won
2003	39th Baeksang Arts Awards	Best Actor – Film	Oasis	Nominated
2003	26th Golden Cinematography Awards	Most Popular Actor	Oasis	Won
2003	3rd Korea World Youth Film Festival	Favorite Actor	Oasis	Won
2004	40th Baeksang Arts Awards	Best Actor – Film	Silmido	Nominated
2005	42nd Grand Bell Awards	Best Actor	Rikidōzan	Nominated
2005	42nd Grand Bell Awards	Best Actor	Another Public Enemy	Nominated
2006	3rd Max Movie Awards	Best Actor	Another Public Enemy	Nominated
2007	44th Grand Bell Awards	Best Actor	Voice of a Murderer	Nominated
2007	28th Blue Dragon Film Awards	Best Leading Actor	Voice of a Murderer	Nominated
2007	6th Korean Film Awards	Best Actor	Cruel Winter Blues	Nominated
2007	15th Chunsa Film Art Awards	Best Actor	Cruel Winter Blues	Nominated
2008	16th Chunsa Film Art Awards	Best Actor	Public Enemy Returns	Nominated
2008	29th Blue Dragon Film Awards	Best Leading Actor	Public Enemy Returns	Nominated
2008	29th Blue Dragon Film Awards	Popular Star Award	Public Enemy Returns	Won
2009	45th Baeksang Arts Awards	Best Actor – Film	Public Enemy Returns	Nominated
2009	17th Korean Culture and Entertainment Awards	Grand Prize (Daesang) for Film	Haeundae	Won
2009	46th Grand Bell Awards	Best Actor	Haeundae	Nominated
2010	18th Chunsa Film Art Awards	Best Actor	No Mercy	Won
2013	33rd Korean Association of Film Critics Awards	Best Actor	Hope	Nominated
2013	34th Blue Dragon Film Awards	Best Leading Actor	Hope	Nominated
2013	34th Blue Dragon Film Awards	Popular Star Award	Hope	Won
2014	50th Baeksang Arts Awards	Best Actor – Film	Hope	Won
2014	13th New York Asian Film Festival	Star Asia Award	—N/a	Won
2014	22nd Korean Culture and Entertainment Awards	Grand Prize (Daesang) for Film	My Dictator	Won
2014	1st Korean Film Producers Association Awards	Best Actor	My Dictator	Won
2015	35th Golden Cinematography Awards	Best Actor	My Dictator	Won
2015	51st Baeksang Arts Awards	Best Actor – Film	My Dictator	Nominated
2017	Korean Film Shining Star Awards	Star Award	The Merciless, Lucid Dream	Won
2017	1st The Seoul Awards	Best Actor	The Merciless, Memoir of a Murderer	Nominated
2017	54th Grand Bell Awards	Best Actor	The Merciless	Won
2017	37th Korean Association of Film Critics Awards	Best Actor	The Merciless	Won
2017	38th Blue Dragon Film Awards	Popular Star Award	The Merciless	Won
2017	38th Blue Dragon Film Awards	Best Leading Actor	The Merciless	Nominated
2017	Cine 21 Awards	Best Actor	The Merciless	Won
2017	17th Director's Cut Awards	Best Actor	Memoir of a Murderer	Won
2018	9th KOFRA Film Awards	Best Actor	Memoir of a Murderer	Won
2018	54th Baeksang Arts Awards	Best Actor – Film	The Merciless	Nominated
2018	23rd Chunsa Film Art Awards	Best Actor	The Merciless	Nominated
2019	23rd Fantasia International Film Festival	Best Actor	Idol	Won
2019	28th Buil Film Awards	Best Actor	Birthday	Nominated
2019	40th Blue Dragon Film Awards	Best Leading Actor	Birthday	Nominated
2020	56th Grand Bell Awards	Best Actor	Birthday	Nominated
2021	57th Baeksang Arts Awards	Best Actor – Film	The Book of Fish	Nominated
2021	26th Chunsa Film Art Awards	Best Actor	The Book of Fish	Nominated
2021	30th Buil Film Awards	Best Actor	The Book of Fish	Nominated
2021	41st Korean Association of Film Critics Awards	Best Actor	The Book of Fish	Won
2021	42nd Blue Dragon Film Awards	Best Leading Actor	The Book of Fish	Won
2021	41st Golden Cinematography Awards	Best Actor	The Book of Fish	Won
2021	Korea University Film Festival	Best Actor	The Book of Fish	Won
2021	8th Korean Film Producers Association Awards	Best Actor	The Book of Fish	Won
2021	Cine 21 Awards	Best Actor	The Book of Fish	Won
2022	20th Director's Cut Awards	Best Actor in film	The Book of Fish	Nominated
2022	58th Baeksang Arts Awards	Best Actor – Film	Kingmaker	Won
2022	27th Chunsa Film Art Awards	Best Actor	Kingmaker	Nominated
2022	58th Grand Bell Awards	Best Actor	Kingmaker	Nominated
2022	43rd Blue Dragon Film Awards	Best Leading Actor	Kingmaker	Nominated
2024	10th Marie Claire Asia Star Awards	Best Actor	A Normal Family	Won
2025	46th Blue Dragon Film Awards	Best Leading Actor	A Normal Family	Nominated
2025	29th Chunsa Film Art Awards	Film Directors' Choices for Best Actor	Good News	Won
2025	Seoul Global Movie Awards	Best Actor	Good News	Won
2026	47th Blue Dragon Film Awards	Best Leading Actor	Possible Love	Pending

=== Listicles ===
Name of publisher, year listed, name of listicle, and placement
Publisher	Year	Listicle	Placement	Ref.
Forbes	2010	Korea Power Celebrity 40	33rd	
JoyNews24	2008	Most Favourite Male Movie Character	1st	
Korean Film Council	2021	Korean Actors 200 (Note: Introduces 200 actors that best represent the present and future of Korean cinema to the people in the film industry all over the world)	Included	
The Screen	2005	Most Influential Actor	1st	
The Screen	2009	1984–2008 Top Box Office Powerhouse Actors in Korean Movies	5th	
The Screen	2019	2009–2019 Top Box Office Powerhouse Actors in Korean Movies	12th	
Sisa Journal	2008	Next Generation Leader — Film Industry	6th	
Sisa Journal	2009	Next Generation Leader — Film Industry	4th	
