= Memories of the Sword =

- Theatrical release poster
- Hangul: 협녀: 칼의 기억
- Hanja: 俠女: 칼의 記憶
- RR: Hyeomnyeo: karui gieok
- MR: Hyŏmnyŏ: k'arŭi kiŏk
- Directed by: Park Heung-sik
- Written by: Park Heung-sik; Choi A-reum
- Produced by: Kim Hyun-chul
- Starring: Lee Byung-hun; Jeon Do-yeon; Kim Go-eun
- Cinematography: Kim Byung-seo
- Edited by: Oh Myoung-jun
- Music by: Mowg
- Distributed by: Lotte Entertainment (South Korea); Well Go USA (United States)
- Release date: August 13, 2015 (South Korea)
- Running time: 121 minutes
- Country: South Korea
- Language: Korean
- Budget: ₩10 billion
- Box office: US$2.4 million

Memories of the Sword (Korean: 협녀: 칼의 기억; lit. 'Female Warrior: Memories of the Sword') is a 2015 South Korean martial arts period action film co-written and directed by Park Heung-sik, starring Lee Byung-hun, Jeon Do-yeon and Kim Go-eun.

== Plot ==
This is a story of three swordsmen, Poong-cheon, Seol-rang, and Deok-gi, who led an uprising during the Goryeo era. When their desire for freedom and justice is about to be fulfilled, Deok-gi betrays them, leading to the death of Poong-cheon, and to Seol-rang disappearing along with Poong-cheon's infant daughter Hong-ee. When Seol-rang leaves, Deok-gi intones the prophecy that "You, no, not just you, but you and I both will be killed by Hong-ee."

Eighteen years later, Seol-rang, now called Wallso, is a blind woman with two children who manages a tea house at Byukran port. Determined to take revenge on Deok-gi, Wallso tries to teach Hong-ee to become a master of the sword, but Hong-ee (who changed her name to Seol-hee) is much more interested in day-to-day affairs than what happened to her father in the past.

One day, a big sword match hosted by the powerful military ruler Deok-gi (now known as Yoo-baek) is held in the market. Seol-hee participates in the match despite Wallso's objections. As the match progresses, she ends up fighting Yull, who is the master of the sword.

Yoo-baek realizes that Seol-hee's skill with the sword is similar to Seol-rang's, whom he had once loved. Yoo-baek orders his subordinates to catch Seol-hee, but she is able to run away. That same night, Seol-hee learns how her father, Poong-cheon died. Wallso tells her that there are two enemies that Seol-hee is destined to vanquish: Yoo-baek, and Wallso herself. Shocked and desperate, Seol-hee leaves home: the beginning of a long journey of revenge.

== Cast ==
- Lee Byung-hun as Deok-gi/Yoo-baek
- Jeon Do-yeon as Seol-rang/Wallso
- Kim Go-eun as Hong-ee/Seol-hee
- Lee Geung-young as Teacher
- Kim Tae-woo as Jon-bok
- Lee Jun-ho as Yull
- Kim Soo-an as Gu-seul
- Kim Young-min as Wang
- Sung Yu-bin as Gam-cho
- Moon Sung-keun as Lee Ee-myeong
- Bae Soo-bin as Poong-cheon
