= My Mother, the Mermaid =

- Theatrical release poster
- Hangul: 인어공주
- Hanja: 人漁公主
- RR: Ineogongju
- MR: Inŏgongju
- Directed by: Park Heung-sik
- Written by: Park Heung-sik; Song Hye-jin
- Produced by: Lee Joon-dong
- Starring: Jeon Do-yeon; Park Hae-il; Go Doo-shim
- Cinematography: Choi Young-taek
- Edited by: Kim Yang-il
- Music by: Jo Seong-woo
- Distributed by: CJ Entertainment
- Release date: June 30, 2004 (South Korea)
- Running time: 110 minutes
- Country: South Korea
- Language: Korean

My Mother, the Mermaid (Korean: 인어공주; RR: Ineogongju; lit. 'The Mermaid Princess') is a 2004 South Korean romantic fantasy film directed by Park Heung-sik. It follows a young woman who quarrels with her mother but is somehow transported back in time and sees her parents' courtship. In her youth, her mother was a haenyeo, a traditional freediver.

== Synopsis ==
Na-young is an office worker who lives with her seemingly emotionally non-existent father Jin-kook, and loud cynical mother Yeon-soon. As time passes, she is becoming more and more like her mother Yeon-soon.

One day, her father suddenly disappears and she skips her international airplane flight to find him. By entering her father's hometown, she is somehow transported back in time to when her parents' relationship was just beginning. She meets her mother, now a poor young woman working hard as a haenyo to send her younger brother to school to get the education she never received. Her father is a charming man who works as a postmaster who delivers mail all over the town where her mother lived. He befriends Yeon-soon and teaches her how to read and write.

Na-young is taken in by the young Yeon-soon and, as they are now roughly the same age, the two become very close. Na-young is able to experience the trials, heartbreaks, and celebrations of Yeon-soon before she herself is suddenly transported back into the present time.

== Cast ==
- Jeon Do-yeon as Na-young / young Yeon-soon
- Park Hae-il as young Jin-kook
- Go Doo-shim as Yeon-soon
- Kim Bong-geun as Jin-kook
- Lee Sun-kyun as Do-hyeon

== Awards and nominations ==
Award	Year	Category	Recipient(s)	Result
Baeksang Arts Awards	2005	Best Director	Park Heung-sik	Won
Baeksang Arts Awards	2005	Best Actress	Jeon Do-yeon	Nominated
Blue Dragon Film Awards	2004	Best Film	My Mother, the Mermaid	Nominated
Blue Dragon Film Awards	2004	Best Director	Park Heung-sik	Nominated
Blue Dragon Film Awards	2004	Best Actress	Jeon Do-yeon	Nominated
Blue Dragon Film Awards	2004	Best Supporting Actress	Go Doo-shim	Nominated
Blue Dragon Film Awards	2004	Best Cinematography	Choi Young-taek	Nominated
Busan Film Critics Awards	2004	Best Supporting Actress	Go Doo-shim	Won
Chunsa Film Art Awards	2005	Best Actress	Jeon Do-yeon	Won
Director's Cut Awards	2004	Best Actress	Jeon Do-yeon	Won
Grand Bell Awards	2005	Best Director	Park Heung-sik	Nominated
Grand Bell Awards	2005	Best Actress	Jeon Do-yeon	Nominated
Grand Bell Awards	2005	Best Supporting Actress	Go Doo-shim	Nominated
Grand Bell Awards	2005	Best Screenplay	Park Heung-sik and Song Hye-jin	Nominated
Korean Film Awards	2004	Best Screenplay	Park Heung-sik and Song Hye-jin	Nominated
Korean Film Awards	2004	Best Actor	Park Hae-il	Nominated
Korean Film Awards	2004	Best Actress	Jeon Do-yeon	Won
Korean Film Awards	2004	Best Supporting Actress	Go Doo-shim	Won
Korean Film Awards	2004	Best Cinematography	Choi Young-taek	Nominated
Korean Film Awards	2004	Best Art Direction	Cho Geun-hyun	Nominated
Korean Film Awards	2004	Best Music	Jo Seong-woo	Nominated
