= Kill Boksoon =

2023 South Korean action thriller film

- Release poster
- Hangul: 길복순
- RR: Gil Boksun
- MR: Kil Poksun
- Directed by: Byun Sung-hyun
- Written by: Byun Sung-hyun
- Produced by: Yi Jin-hee
- Starring: Jeon Do-yeon; Sul Kyung-gu; Kim Si-a; Esom; Koo Kyo-hwan
- Cinematography: Cho Hyung-rae
- Edited by: Kim Sang-bum
- Music by: Lee Jin-hee; Kim Hong-jip
- Production company: See At Film
- Distributed by: Netflix
- Release dates: February 18, 2023 (Berlinale); March 31, 2023 (South Korea)
- Running time: 137 minutes
- Country: South Korea
- Language: Korean

Kill Boksoon (Korean: 길복순) is a 2023 South Korean action thriller film directed and written by Byun Sung-hyun, starring Jeon Do-yeon, Sul Kyung-gu, Kim Si-a, Esom, and Koo Kyo-hwan. It premiered on Netflix on March 31, 2023.

== Plot ==
A man lies half-naked on the cold ground, clutching a pillow. Wondering if he had left a hotel window open, he realizes he is on a bridge. Soon, the contract killer Gil Bok-soon wakes him. He is revealed to be Shinichiro Oda, a second-generation Korean-Japanese yakuza. Oda asks why she has not killed him yet. Bok-soon mentions her daughter Jae-young, recalling a moment when Jae-young criticized corruption and unfair competition. Seeking a fair fight, Bok-soon allows Oda to prepare his weapon, but when the duel begins, she abruptly abandons the rules, shooting him mid-battle. As Oda curses her in Korean, Bok-soon finishes him off.

After returning home, Bok-soon resumes her quiet domestic life. While doing laundry, she discovers cigarettes in Jae-young's clothes, triggering memories of a strict, abusive father who once forced her to eat a cigarette as punishment. Bok-soon smokes in silence, unable to confront her daughter about it when Jae-young returns. Meanwhile, her agency director Min-kyu assigns her a new contract, a choice between a foreign or domestic assassination. Worrying about Jae-young, Bok-soon picks the local job. The target is a prime minister nominee who staged his son's death as a murder-suicide to cover up a college admissions scandal. Realizing the target's guilt and his grief, she spares him and lies about the mission's failure.

Min-kyu grows suspicious, but Bok-soon insists it was a failure, supported by her intern Young-ji. Soon after, Jae-young stabs a classmate, Chul-woo, with scissors. At school, Bok-soon learns everyone involved refuses to talk, leaving Jae-young at risk of expulsion. Later, Jae-young confesses to her mother that she is a lesbian. She reveals the stabbing was retaliation against Chul-woo, who had secretly filmed her and her girlfriend So-ra, then blackmailed them. When he mocked their relationship, Jae-young lashed out in anger.

Amid these troubles, Young-ji visits Bok-soon after being fired. Bok-soon takes her to a friend's restaurant, where several fellow assassins, including her close colleague Hee-sung, arrive. It turns out Hee-sung had staged Bok-soon's failed mission to earn a promotion, manipulated by Min-kyu's sister Min-hee, who wants Bok-soon dead. The assassins turn on Bok-soon, but she kills them all in a brutal fight, sparing only Young-ji. Learning Hee-sung's betrayal was coerced, she ends his life herself and reports the cleanup. Furious, Min-kyu confronts her, forcing her to a new contract. After that, Min-kyu confront Young-ji and kills her.

Later, Bok-soon kills Min-hee in revenge and faces Min-kyu in a final confrontation. They feign civility but soon clash violently. Bok-soon manipulates Min-kyu's emotions and kills him, not realizing that his office CCTV was streaming live to a tablet delivered to Jae-young. When Bok-soon rushes home in horror, expecting trauma, she instead finds her daughter calm and affectionate. In the epilogue, Bok-soon tends her plants as news reports that the corrupt prime minister candidate has been found dead in an apparent suicide. Meanwhile, Jae-young, dressed in red like her mother, visits her school one last time, leaving cryptic, threatening words to So-ra and Chul-woo before walking away with confidence.

== Cast ==
- Jeon Do-yeon as Gil Bok-soon ("Kill Boksoon"), a single mother and the best killer of agency M.K. Ent
  - Park Se-hyun as young Boksoon
- Sul Kyung-gu as Cha Min-kyu, CEO of M.K. Ent
  - Lee Jae-wook as young Min-kyu
- Kim Si-a as Gil Jae-young, the daughter of Boksoon who knows nothing about her mother's profession
- Esom as Cha Min-hee, director of M.K. Ent and younger sister of Min-kyu
- Koo Kyo-hwan as Han Hee-sung, an affiliated killer of M.K. Ent
- Lee Yeon as Kim Young-ji, a member of M.K. Ent
- Park Kwang-jae as Gwang-man
- Jang In-sub as Yoon-seok
- Choi Byung-mo as Hyun-chul
- Kim Sung-oh as Sergeant Shin
- Kim Ki-cheon as Soo-geun
- Gi Ju-bong as CEO Ki
- Kim Jun-bae as CEO Bae
- Jang Hyun-sung as Gil Boksoon's father
- Hwang Jung-min as Shinichiro Oda / Kim Kwang-li
- Yoon Kyung-ho as Principal Yang No-soon
- Kim Jae-hwa as Yoo Cheol-woo's mother

== Production ==
On January 4, 2022, Kill Boksoon confirmed production with the ensemble casting of Jeon Do-yeon, Sul Kyung-gu, Esom, and Koo Kyo-hwan as the lead roles. On April 7, 2022, it was reported that actress Jeon Do-yeon was injured while filming and stopped filming, but after receiving treatment at the hospital, she returned to the scene and continued filming.

== Release ==
The film had its world premiere in the Berlinale Special section of the 73rd Berlin International Film Festival on February 18, 2023. It was released on Netflix on March 31, 2023.

== Reception ==
=== Critical response ===
On the review aggregator website Rotten Tomatoes, 79% of 34 critics' reviews are positive, with an average rating of 6.8/10. The website's consensus reads: "Although its impact is blunted somewhat by meandering length and some cheesy visual effects, Kill Boksoon remains a pleasing punch to the gut for action fans."

=== Accolades ===
Award ceremony	Year	Category	Nominee / Work	Result	Ref.
Baeksang Arts Awards	2023	Best Actress	Jeon Do-yeon	Nominated	
Baeksang Arts Awards	2023	Best Supporting Actress	Lee Yeon	Nominated	
Bechdel Day	2023	Bechdel Choice 10 — Film	Kill Boksoon	Top 10	
Buil Film Awards	2023	Best Actress	Jeon Do-yeon	Nominated	
Buil Film Awards	2023	Best Supporting Actress	Lee Yeon	Nominated	
Golden Trailer Awards	2023	Best Foreign Poster	"Date Announcement" (The Refinery)	Won	

== Spin-off ==
In September 2024, Netflix announced the casting of Yim Si-wan and Park Gyu-young for the film, Mantis, a character that is only mentioned in Kill Boksoon. The film was released on September 26, 2025 on Netflix.
