= Secret Sunshine =

2007 South Korean melodrama film by Lee Chang-Dong

- Theatrical release poster
- Hangul: 밀양
- Hanja: 密陽
- RR: Miryang
- MR: Miryang
- Directed by: Lee Chang-dong
- Written by: Lee Chang-dong
- Based on: "The Abject" by Lee Cheong-jun
- Produced by: Lee Han-na; Lee Chang-dong
- Starring: Jeon Do-yeon; Song Kang-ho
- Cinematography: Jo Yong-gyu
- Edited by: Kim Hyeon
- Music by: Christian Basso
- Production companies: Cinema Service; Pinehouse Films
- Distributed by: CJ Entertainment
- Release date: May 23, 2007
- Running time: 142 minutes
- Country: South Korea
- Language: Korean
- Budget: US$3.5 million
- Box office: US$11.6 million

Secret Sunshine (Korean: 밀양; RR: Miryang) is a 2007 South Korean drama film written and directed by Lee Chang-dong. The screenplay based on the short story "The Abject" by Lee Cheong-jun that focuses on a woman as she wrestles with the questions of grief, madness and faith. The Korean title "Miryang" is named after the city where the film was set and filmed; "Secret Sunshine" is the literal translation. For her performance, Jeon Do-yeon won Prix d'interprétation féminine (Best Actress) at the 2007 Cannes Film Festival. The film also won Best Film at the Asian Film Awards and the Asia Pacific Screen Awards. The film sold 1,710,364 tickets in South Korea.

== Plot ==
Lee Shin-ae and her only child Jun move to Miryang, South Gyeongsang Province, the hometown of her late husband, to start anew. When her car breaks down, Kim Jong-chan, a clumsy mechanic, fixes the car and assists Shin-ae as she opens a piano academy and attempts to purchase land to build a house on. Jong-chan soon develops a crush on Shin-ae and begins to follow her around. Just outside her home, a devout pharmacist attempts to convert her. Shin-ae is skeptical but nevertheless takes the pharmacist's scripture.

One night, Shin-ae returns home late after partying to discover that Jun is missing. She receives a phone call from Jun's kidnapper and draws all of the money from her bank account to pay as ransom. The kidnapper is appalled at the pitiful amount of money, while Shin-ae insists that she has no more and the attempt to invest in land was a lie to appear rich. A few days later, Jun's body is discovered by a reservoir. Park Do-seop, Jun's daycare teacher, is soon arrested and convicted. A devastated Shin-ae is soon convinced by the pharmacist to join her faith, though she does not understand why God would let an innocent child die. Jong-chan starts going to church as well.

Shin-ae remains troubled despite her claim to have found peace. Out of her conviction, she decides to visit Do-seop in prison and forgive him in person. To her surprise, Do-seop reveals that he has also converted to Christianity, and that God has absolved him of his sins. A horrified Shin-ae again becomes consumed by anger and grief. She stops attending church services, and later disrupts a gathering by blasting the Kim Choo-Ja song "It's a Lie" from a stolen CD on a loudspeaker. She accepts Jong-chan's invitation for a dinner date the next day, but instead goes to seduce the pharmacist's husband; he cannot perform and she becomes sick. That evening, she goes to Jong-chan, who angrily rejects her proposal for sex. On the way home, she hurls a rock at the house of the pharmacist couple, who are holding a vigil for her. At home, Shin-ae slashes her wrists.

On the day of her discharge from the hospital, Jong-chan takes her to a hair salon. She storms out when she realizes she is being served by the murderer's daughter. Ultimately, she cuts her own hair in her own backyard. Jong-chan arrives, offering to hold up a mirror for her.

== Cast ==
- Jeon Do-yeon as Lee Shin-ae
- Song Kang-ho as Kim Jong-chan
- Jo Young-jin as Park Do-seop
- Kim Young-jae as Lee Min-ki
- Seon Jeong-yeop as Jun
- Song Mi-rim as Jeong-ah
- Kim Mi-hyang as Deacon Kim
- Lee Yoon-hee as Elder Kang
- Kim Jong-soo as President Shin
- Cha Mi-kyung as tailor shop owner
- Lee Sung-min as chef
- Kim Mi-kyung as dressmaker
- Lee Joong-ok as Hope House employee
- Yeom Hye-ran as in-law relative

== Critical response ==
The film was widely acclaimed on the festival circuit, with universal praise for Jeon Do-yeon's performance. It received multiple awards including Best Film and Best Actress for Jeon. It was also nominated for the Palme d'Or at the 2007 Cannes Film Festival.

Secret Sunshine received acclaim in the U.S. in 2010. On Rotten Tomatoes, it has an approval rating of 94% based on 31 reviews, with an average rating of 7.68/10. The site's critical consensus reads, "Plumbing the depths of tragedy without succumbing to melodrama, Chang-dong Lee's Secret Sunshine is a grueling, albeit moving, piece of beautifully acted cinema." With 6 reviews, it scored 84 on Metacritic, indicating "universal acclaim". A.O. Scott of the New York Times called the film "clear, elegant and lyrical. The experience of watching [Chang-dong's] films is not always pleasant... yet his quiet and exacting humaneness infuses even the most dreadful moments with an intimation of grace." Noel Murray, writing for the A.V. Club, called it "a frequently beautiful film with a cold, dark heart" and praised Do-yeon's "powerful performance". Michael Atkinson of the Village Voice wrote that "the red-eyed Jeon, landing a Best Actress at Cannes in 2007 and unforgettable as well in The Housemaid, goes to hell and back." In 2019, director Hirokazu Kore-eda named it as the best film of the 21st century, praising Lee's "deep insight into human nature". In 2020, The Guardian ranked it number 7 among the classics of modern South Korean Cinema.

=== Home video release ===
On August 23, 2011, The Criterion Collection released the film on DVD and Blu-ray, both of which include a new video interview with Lee Chang-dong, behind-the-scenes featurette, US theatrical trailer and booklet with a new essay by film critic Dennis Lim.

== Accolades ==
The film was selected as South Korea's official submission for the Academy Award for Best Foreign Language Film at the 80th Academy Awards.

Year	Award	Category	Recipient	Result
2007	60th Cannes Film Festival	Palme d'Or	Lee Chang-dong	Nominated
2007	60th Cannes Film Festival	Best Actress	Jeon Do-yeon	Won
2007	44th Grand Bell Awards	Special Prize	Jeon Do-yeon	Won
2007	1st Asia Pacific Screen Awards	Best Film	Secret Sunshine	Won
2007	1st Asia Pacific Screen Awards	Best Actress	Jeon Do-yeon	Won
2007	1st Asia Pacific Screen Awards	Best Screenplay	Lee Chang-dong	Nominated
2007	27th Korean Association of Film Critics Awards	Best Actress	Jeon Do-yeon	Won
2007	28th Blue Dragon Film Awards	Best Actress	Jeon Do-yeon	Won
2007	6th Korean Film Awards	Best Film	Secret Sunshine	Won
2007	6th Korean Film Awards	Best Director	Lee Chang-dong	Won
2007	6th Korean Film Awards	Best Actor	Song Kang-ho	Won
2007	6th Korean Film Awards	Best Actress	Jeon Do-yeon	Won
2007	6th Korean Film Awards	Best Screenplay	Lee Chang-dong	Nominated
2007	6th Korean Film Awards	Best Cinematography	Jo Yong-gyu	Nominated
2007	Women in Film Korea Awards	Best Actress	Jeon Do-yeon	Won
2007	10th Director's Cut Awards	Best Director	Lee Chang-dong	Won
2007	10th Director's Cut Awards	Best Actor	Song Kang-ho	Won
2007	10th Director's Cut Awards	Best Actress	Jeon Do-yeon	Won
2007	3rd University Film Festival of Korea	Best Actress	Jeon Do-yeon	Won
2007	Cine 21 Awards	Best Actress	Jeon Do-yeon	Won
2007	IndieWire Critics Poll	Best Undistributed Film	Secret Sunshine	Won
2007	Village Voice Film Poll	Best Undistributed Film	Secret Sunshine	Won
2008	2nd Asian Film Awards	Best Film	Secret Sunshine	Won
2008	2nd Asian Film Awards	Best Director	Lee Chang-dong	Won
2008	2nd Asian Film Awards	Best Actor	Song Kang-ho	Nominated
2008	2nd Asian Film Awards	Best Actress	Jeon Do-yeon	Won
2008	44th Baeksang Arts Awards	Best Film	Secret Sunshine	Nominated
2008	44th Baeksang Arts Awards	Best Director	Lee Chang-dong	Won
2008	44th Baeksang Arts Awards	Best Actress	Jeon Do-yeon	Nominated
2008	44th Baeksang Arts Awards	Best Screenplay	Lee Chang-dong	Nominated
2008	45th Grand Bell Awards	Best Film	Secret Sunshine	Nominated
2008	45th Grand Bell Awards	Best Director	Lee Chang-dong	Nominated
2008	45th Grand Bell Awards	Best Actor	Song Kang-ho	Nominated
2008	45th Grand Bell Awards	Best Actress	Jeon Do-yeon	Nominated
2008	Asian Film Critics Association Awards	Best Picture	Secret Sunshine	Nominated
2008	Asian Film Critics Association Awards	Best Director	Lee Chang-dong	Nominated
2008	Asian Film Critics Association Awards	Best Actress	Jeon Do-yeon	Won
2008	Asian Film Critics Association Awards	Best Screenplay	Lee Chang-dong	Won
2008	Palm Springs International Film Festival	Best Actor	Song Kang-ho	Won
2010	Village Voice Film Poll	Best Actress	Jeon Do-yeon	5th place
2010	IndieWire Critics Poll	Best Actress	Jeon Do-yeon	7th place
2010	IndieWire Critics Poll	Best Screenplay	Lee Chang-dong	5th place
2010	International Cinephile Society Awards	Best Actress	Jeon Do-yeon	Nominated
2010	International Cinephile Society Awards	Best Film Not in the English Language	Secret Sunshine	10th place

== See also ==
- Miryang
- List of submissions to the 80th Academy Awards for Best Foreign Language Film
- List of South Korean submissions for the Academy Award for Best International Feature Film
