= Go Doo-shim =

South Korean actress (born 1951)

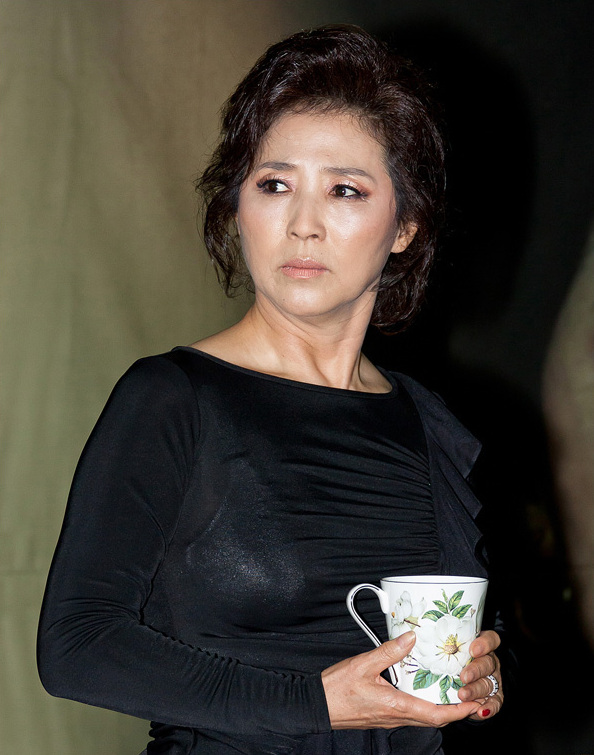
- Go in 2012
- Born: May 22, 1951 (age 75); Jeju, South Korea
- Other name: Ko Doo-sim
- Education: Jeju Girls' High School; Jeju National University – Honorary doctorate in Literature
- Occupation: Actress
- Years active: 1972–present
- Spouse: Kim Ji-hong (m. 1976; div. 1998)
- Children: 2
- Honours: Okgwan Order of Cultural Merit (2007)

Korean name
- Hangul: 고두심
- Hanja: 高斗心
- RR: Go Dusim
- MR: Ko Tusim

Go Doo-shim (Korean: 고두심; born May 22, 1951) is a South Korean actress.

== Career ==
A native of Jeju Island, Go Doo-shim made her acting debut in 1972 and since then she had a prolific career on television, film and theater.

Best known for playing the quintessential devoted, self-sacrificing mother figure on TV, Go has won the Daesang (the highest acting prize in Korea) a record number of seven times: for her performances in the dramas Fetters of Love (1989), The Dancing Gayageum (1990), My Husband's Woman (1992), Virtue (2000), Ode to the Han River (2004), More Beautiful Than a Flower (2004) and All About My Mom (2015). Go was reported to be the top earner among all actors and entertainers who appeared on the KBS network in 2004, with total earnings of ₩373 million.

She also received acclaim for more atypical roles in the films Jealousy (1983), My Mother, the Mermaid (2004), Family Ties (2006), and Good Morning President (2009).

To celebrate her 40th anniversary in the entertainment industry, Go returned to the stage in a 2012 production of Richard Alfieri's Six Dance Lessons in Six Weeks.

== Filmography ==
=== Television series ===
- Chief Inspector (MBC, 1972)
- Guest (MBC, 1974)
- Seong Chun-hyang (MBC, 1974)
- Reed (MBC, 1974)
- Annyeong (Hi) (MBC, 1975)
- Tide (MBC, 1975)
- The Way Back (MBC, 1975)
- Iron's Adventure (MBC, 1976)
- Purity (MBC, 1976)
- Investigative Team 113 – 200th Episode Special (MBC, 1977)
- I Regret (MBC, 1977)
- X Search Party (MBC, 1978)
- Owner (MBC, 1978)
- Hot Hands (MBC, 1978)
- Rouge (MBC, 1978)
- Hope (MBC, 1979)
- Anguk-dong Lady (MBC, 1979)
- Become a Mountain and Become a River (MBC, 1979)
- Oil (MBC, 1980)
- Country Diaries (MBC, 1980–2002)
- Attorney Hong (MBC, 1980)
- Heungbujeon (MBC, 1980)
- Abe's Family (MBC, 1980)
- Prince Yi Kang (MBC, 1980)
- Symphony of Spring (MBC, 1981)
- Gyo-dong Madam (MBC, 1981)
- Women's Country (MBC/Yomiuri TV, 1981)
- Veteran (MBC, 1981)
- Burning Bridges (MBC, 1981)
- Chief Inspector – "The Sound of a Baby's Cries" (MBC, 1981)
- Saeassi (MBC, 1981)
- Ishim's Secret Skill (MBC, 1981)
- Annals of Renunciation – An Hee-je (MBC, 1982)
- Escape (MBC, 1982)
- Saedaek (MBC, 1983)
- Jester (MBC, 1983)
- Bongamri Children (MBC, 1983)
- Gosanja Kim Jeong-ho (MBC, 1983)
- 500 Years of Joseon: The Ume Tree in the Midst of the Snow (MBC, 1984)
- MBC Bestseller Theater – "Lodging" (MBC, 1987)
- MBC Bestseller Theater – "Yellow Half Moon" (MBC, 1987)
- MBC Bestseller Theater – "Surene" (MBC, 1987)
- Temptation (MBC, 1987)
- MBC Bestseller Theater – "Rain Shower" (MBC, 1987)
- Bucho (MBC, 1987)
- 500 Years of Joseon: Queen Inhyeon (MBC, 1988)
- MBC Bestseller Theater – "The Third Encounter" (MBC, 1988)
- Making Memories (MBC, 1989)
- The Confines of Love (KBS2, 1989)
- MBC Bestseller Theater – "Imjin River" (MBC, 1989)
- Flaming River (MBC, 1989)
- The 2nd Republic (MBC, 1989)
- The House with a Deep Yard (MBC, 1990)
- 500 Years of Joseon: Daewongun (MBC, 1990)
- Two Diaries (MBC, 1990)
- The Dancing Gayageum (MBC, 1990)
- Beyond the Mountains (MBC, 1991)
- Kingdom of Anger (MBC, 1992)
- My Husband's Woman (KBS2, 1992)
- Sons and Daughters (MBC, 1992)
- Nakdong River (MBC, 1993)
- MBC Best Theater – "Flower Fertilizer" (MBC, 1993)
- Attorney Park Bong-sook (SBS, 1994)
- Korea Gate (SBS, 1995)
- Men of the Bath House (KBS2, 1995)
- Mom's Flag (SBS, 1996–1997)
- MBC Best Theater – "Haunted House" (MBC, 1996)
- What To Say (SBS, 1996)
- Sit by the River and Weep (MBC, 1996)
- Im Kkeok-jeong (SBS, 1996)
- Daughter's Choice (MBC, 1997)
- The Reason I Live (MBC, 1997)
- Drops (MBC, 1997)
- Young (SBS, 1997)
- I Love You! I Love You! (SBS, 1998)
- I Hate You, But It's Fine (SBS, 1998–1999)
- Love and Success (MBC, 1998)
- Someone's House (KBS1, 1999)
- Should My Tears Show (MBC, 1999)
- Virtue (SBS, 2000)
- Mom and Sister (MBC, 2000)
- The Rules of Marriage (MBC, 2001)
- Around the Corner (MBC, 2001)
- Legend (SBS, 2001)
- Fox and Cotton Candy (MBC, 2001)
- Picnic (MBC, 2001)
- Miss Mermaid (MBC, 2002)
- Rustic Period (SBS, 2002)
- MBC Best Theater – "Evil Relationship" (MBC, 2002)
- Like a Flowing River (SBS, 2002)
- Sweetheart (SBS, 2003)
- Yeonhwa Island (MBC, 2004)
- More Beautiful Than a Flower (KBS2, 2004)
- Ode to the Han River (MBC, 2004)
- You are a Star (KBS1, 2004)
- Best Mother (SBS, 2005)
- The Youth in Barefoot (MBC, 2005)
- Seoul 1945 (KBS1, 2006)
- How Much Love? (MBC, 2006)
- The Snow Queen (KBS2, 2006–2007)
- TV Literature – "A Dwarf Launches a Little Ball" (KBS1, 2007)
- A Happy Woman (KBS2, 2007)
- Kimcheed Radish Cubes (MBC, 2007–2008)
- Kaikyo (NHK, 2007)
- Chunja's Special Day (MBC, 2008)
- Aster (MBC, 2008)
- Swallow the Sun (SBS, 2009)
- Life is Good (MBC, 2009)
- The Great Merchant (KBS1, 2010)
- Please Marry Me (KBS2, 2010)
- Twinkle Twinkle (MBC, 2011)
- The Peak (MBC, 2011)
- If Tomorrow Comes (SBS, 2011–2012)
- Immortal Classic (Channel A, 2012)
- You Are the Best! (KBS2, 2013)
- Hur Jun, The Original Story (MBC, 2013)
- Marry Him If You Dare (KBS2, 2013)
- One Warm Word (SBS, 2013)
- Mother's Garden (MBC, 2014)
- Drama Festival – "Old Farewell" (MBC, 2014)
- 4 Legendary Witches (MBC, 2014)
- High Society (SBS, 2015)
- All About My Mom (KBS2, 2015)
- The Virtual Bride (KBS2, 2015)
- Dear My Friends (tvN, 2016)
- Second to Last Love (SBS, 2016)
- Our Gap-soon (SBS, 2016–2017)
- My Mister (tvN, 2018)
- Tale of Fairy (tvN, 2018)
- When the Camellia Blooms (KBS2, 2019)
- Country Diaries 2021 (MBC, 2021)
- The One and Only (JTBC, 2021)
- Our Blues (tvN, 2022)
- Curtain Call (2022)
- Island (TVING, 2022)
- Twinkling Watermelon (tvN, 2023)
- The Atypical Family (JTBC, 2024)
- Sold Out on You (SBS, 2026)

=== Film ===
- The Woman Who Leaves Work in the Morning (1979)
- The Hidden Hero (1980)
- Two Women (1980)
- Jealousy (1983)
- Is the Soldier Back? (1984)
- The Heat of the Green Season (1987)
- Madame Freedom 1990 (1990)
- Things That Sadden My Wife (1991)
- The Woman Who Won't Divorce (1992)
- Plum Blossom (2000)
- Saving My Hubby (2002)
- My Mother, the Mermaid (2004)
- Thomas Ahn Jung-geun (2004)
- Mom's Way (2005)
- Family Ties (2006)
- Good Morning President (2009)
- Grand Prix (2010)
- The Preparation (2017)
- Exit (2019)
- Start-Up (2019, cameo)
- Everglow (2021)

=== Television shows ===
- HD History Special (KBS1, 2005–2006) - MC
- Go Doo-shim's The Art of Cooking (O'live TV, 2012)
- I like Ko Doo-shim (Channel A; LG Hello Vision, 2022)

== Theater ==
- The Mistress of the Inn (1976)
- Bullfighter's Waltz (1977)
- Seventh Table at the Winter Hotel (1979)
- The Cherry Orchard (1989)
- The Visit (1990)
- The Lion in Winter (1993)
- 느영나영 풀멍살게 (1995)
- I, I'm a Woman (monodrama, 1999)
- Mother (2007)
- Six Dance Lessons in Six Weeks (2012)
- Love Tune (2014)

== Radio drama ==
- White Butterfly (MBC, 1975)
- 법정야화 episode 29: The Case of the Ttukseom Serial Murders (MBC, 1978)
- 어떤 관계 (MBC, 1983)
- 30 Turbulent Years (MBC, 1989)

== Accolades ==
=== Awards ===
- 1975 MBC TV: Best New Actress in TV (Tide)
- 1977 13th Baeksang Arts Awards: Best New Actress in TV (Purity)
- 1980 MBC Drama Awards: Best Supporting Actress in TV
- 1982 28th Asia Pacific Film Festival: Best Supporting Actress (Jealousy)
- 1983 22nd Grand Bell Awards: Best Supporting Actress (Jealousy)
- 1984 MBC Drama Awards: Excellence Award, Actress
- 1985 12th Korea Broadcasting Prizes: Excellence Award in TV (Country Diaries)
- 1985 21st Baeksang Arts Awards: Popularity Award in TV (500 Years of Joseon - The Ume Tree in the Midst of the Snow)
- 1986 MBC TV: Top Excellence Award, Actress
- 1989 25th Baeksang Arts Awards: Popularity Award
- 1989 KBS Drama Awards: Grand Prize (Daesang) (Note: A Daesang (Korean: 대상), which translates to "Grand Prize", is the highest honor given out at South Korean award ceremonies.) (Fetters of Love)
- 1990 26th Baeksang Arts Awards: Best Actress (TV) (Fetters of Love)
- 1990 MBC Drama Awards: Grand Prize (Daesang) (The Dancing Gayageum, The House with a Deep Yard)
- 1991 27th Baeksang Arts Awards: Best Actress (TV) (The Dancing Gayageum)
- 1991 4th Korean PD Awards: Best Actress in TV (The Dancing Gayageum)
- 1991 Korea Broadcasting Prizes: Excellence Award in a TV Drama (The Dancing Gayageum)
- 1992 3rd 농촌문화상 문예,대중예술부문 수상
- 1993 29th Baeksang Arts Awards: Grand Prize (Daesang) for Television, Best Actress (TV) (My Husband's Woman)
- 1996 Korean Writers' Association Awards: 가장 문학적인상, Entertainment/Broadcasting category
- 1996 6th 아산효행대상 효친부문 수상
- 1997 Jeju Island Culture Award, Arts category
- 1998 MBC Proud Korean Awards: Best Actress in TV
- 2000 SBS Drama Awards: Grand Prize (Daesang) (Virtue)
- 2000 SBS Drama Awards: Big Star Award (Virtue)
- 2001 MBC Drama Awards: Special Award
- 2002 주를 빛낸 사람 여성부문 선정
- 2003 SBS Drama Awards: Excellence Award, Actress in a Drama Short (Acorn Jelly)
- 2004 31st Korea Broadcasting Prizes: Best Actress in TV (More Beautiful Than a Flower)
- 2004 5th Busan Film Critics Awards: Best Supporting Actress (My Mother, the Mermaid)
- 2004 12th Chunsa Film Art Awards: Best Supporting Actress (My Mother, the Mermaid)
- 2004 14th Korea Catholic Mass Communication Awards: Grand Prize (Daesang) (More Beautiful Than a Flower)
- 2004 3rd Korean Film Awards: Best Supporting Actress (My Mother, the Mermaid)
- 2004 MBC Drama Awards: Grand Prize (Daesang) (Ode to the Han River)
- 2004 KBS Drama Awards: Grand Prize (Daesang) (More Beautiful Than a Flower)
- 2005 28th Golden Cinematography Awards: Most Popular Actress (Mom's Way)
- 2006 47th Thessaloniki Film Festival: Best Actress (Family Ties)
- 2008 5th 불자대상
- 2011 KBS Human Awards: Love and Sharing Award
- 2014 SBS Drama Awards: Special Award, Actress in a Drama Special (One Warm Word)
- 2015 KBS Drama Awards: Grand Prize (Daesang) (All About My Mom)
- 2021 8th Korean Film Producers Association Awards: Best Actress (Everglow)
- 2021 22nd Women in Film Korea Festival : Producer Award (Everglow)
- 2022 58th Baeksang Arts Awards; Best Actress – Film/ Everglow nom
- 2022 Wildflower Film Awards; Best Actress; Everglow nom

=== State honors ===
List of state honor(s)
State	Award Ceremony	Year	Honor	Ref.
South Korea	Culture Day (Note: Since 2010 Honors are given at the Korean Popular Culture and Arts Awards, arranged by the Korea Creative Content Agency and hosted by the Ministry of Culture, Sports and Tourism.)	2007	Okgwan Medal of Cultural Merit	

=== Listicle ===
Name of publisher, year listed, name of listicle, and placement
Publisher	Year	List	Placement	Ref.
KBS	2023	The 50 people who made KBS shine	5th	
Korean Film Council	2021	Korean Actors 200 (Note: Introduces 200 actors that best represent the present and future of Korean cinema to the people in the film industry all over the world.)	Included	
