= Park Heung-sik (born 1965) =

South Korean film director and screenwriter

- Born: November 1965 (age 60); Seoul, South Korea
- Education: Yonsei University; Korean Academy of Film Arts
- Occupations: Film director, screenwriter

Korean name
- Hangul: 박흥식
- RR: Bak Heungsik
- MR: Pak Hŭngsik

Park Heung-sik (Korean: 박흥식; born 1965) is a South Korean film director and screenwriter.

== Career ==
Park Heung-sik studied Astronomy and Atmospheric Sciences at Yonsei University. After graduating in the 8th class of the prestigious Korean Academy of Film Arts, Park first trained as an assistant director under Park Kwang-su and Hur Jin-ho. As seen in his feature directorial debut I Wish I Had a Wife (2001), Park focuses on capturing the delicate flow of emotions that reveal themselves in the ordinary routines of the day. His second film, My Mother, the Mermaid (2004) was an acting showcase for Jeon Do-yeon in dual roles, making more apparent Park's talent in drawing natural acting from his actors and capturing it within the lyrical frame of his film. His third film Bravo, My Life! (2005) was a family drama set against the political upheaval of the late 1970s/early 1980s.

In 2008 Park took on the challenge of directing a 16-episode TV drama adapted from a chick lit novel. My Sweet Seoul depicted the lives of thirty-something modern-day career women.

Park was among the four directors who worked on Sorry, Thanks, a 2011 omnibus film dealing with the profound relationships people establish with their pets. His short My Little Sister is about a six-year-old girl's separation from her dog, which she treats as an imaginary sibling. When the girl's mother gets pregnant with her second child, the family decides to put the dog up for adoption, a frequent occurrence in Korea.

His 2012 film Children of Heaven is set at a middle school where a temporary teacher is called on to take care of troubled students. Funded by the Seoul Metropolitan Office of Education for raising awareness of the issues teenagers often face, such as school violence, the film avoids being a typical message movie by the sympathetic treatment of its characters.

== Filmography ==
- A Single Spark (1995) – assistant director
- The Coat (1996) – assistant director
- Christmas in August (1998) – assistant director
- Young-hee and Joon-ki (short film, 1991) – director, screenwriter
- I Wish I Had a Wife (2001) – director, screenwriter
- My Mother, the Mermaid (2004) – director, screenwriter
- Bravo, My Life (2005) – director, screenwriter
- My Sweet Seoul (TV, 2008) – director
- My Little Sister (short film from Sorry, Thanks omnibus, 2011) – director, screenwriter
- Children of Heaven (2012) – director, screenwriter
- Memories of the Sword (2015) – director, screenwriter
- Love, Lies (2016) – director
- Birth (2022) – director, screenwriter
