= Bravo, My Life =

- Theatrical poster
- Hangul: 사랑해... 말순씨
- RR: Saranghae... Malsun ssi
- MR: Saranghae... Malsun ssi
- Directed by: Park Heung-sik
- Written by: Park Heung-sik; Kang Byeong-hwa; Jang Hak-gyo
- Produced by: Bae Yong-guk
- Starring: Moon So-ri; Lee Jae-eung
- Cinematography: Choi Young-taek
- Edited by: Oh Myeong-jun
- Music by: Jo Seong-woo
- Distributed by: Showeast
- Release date: 3 November 2005 (South Korea)
- Running time: 92 minutes
- Country: South Korea
- Language: Korean
- Box office: US$2,137,265

Bravo, My Life (Korean: 사랑해... 말순씨), also known as Mommy, Dearest, is a 2005 South Korean film directed by Park Heung-sik about an adolescent boy who starts to come of age in the late 70s and early 80s, largely oblivious to the dramatic political events occurring around him. The film sold 406,526 tickets nationwide.

== Plot ==
Bravo, My Life! opens in October 1979 with the news of president Park Chung Hee's assassination. But for 14-year-old Gwang-ho, it is more importantly his first day at junior high, where the kids are interested in football and brawling. Gwang-ho's mother, Mal-soon, whose husband is working in Saudi Arabia, devotes everything to her children. Despite a nagging illness, Mal-soon wears heavy make-up as she sells cosmetics door-to-door. Meanwhile, as his sexual awareness increases, Gwang-ho turns his attention and affection to their pretty neighbor Eun-sook, an assistant nurse who is the complete opposite of Gwang-ho's mother. One day, Gwang-ho receives a "good-luck letter." The letter states that unless he immediately writes and sends the same letter to someone else, he will be faced with bad luck. He starts sending it to people around him, but as those people start vanishing, Gwang-ho is racked with guilt, suspecting the letter of luck is the cause of their disappearance.

== Cast ==
- Moon So-ri as Kim Mal-soon
- Lee Jae-eung as Gwang-ho
- Yoon Jin-seo as Eun-sook
- Kim Dong-young as Chul-ho
- Park Yoo-seon as Hye-sook
- Kim Bong-geun
- Lee Han-wi
- Kang Min-hwi as Jae-myung
- Park Myung-shin
- Jung Da-bin
- Lee Kan-hee as Sang-soo's mother
