= Mantis (film) =

2025 film by Lee Tae-sung

- Release poster
- Hangul: 사마귀
- RR: Samagwi
- MR: Samagwi
- Directed by: Lee Tae-sung
- Written by: Byun Sung-hyun; Lee Tae-sung; Lee Jin-seong
- Produced by: Lee Jin-hee
- Starring: Yim Si-wan; Park Gyu-young; Jo Woo-jin
- Cinematography: Kang Min-woo
- Edited by: Kim Sang-bum; Kim Ho-bin
- Music by: Dalpalan
- Production company: See At Film
- Distributed by: Netflix
- Release date: September 26, 2025
- Running time: 113 minutes
- Country: South Korea
- Language: Korean

Mantis (Korean: 사마귀) is a 2025 South Korean action thriller film directed by Lee Tae-sung in his feature directorial debut. Starring Yim Si-wan, Park Gyu-young, and Jo Woo-jin, the film is a spin-off to the 2023 film Kill Boksoon and set in the same universe. The film was released on September 26, 2025 on Netflix.

== Synopsis ==
The film is about Mantis, a top assassin who comes back from vacation to find the hitman world in chaos after the downfall of the top company, MK. As he reintegrates into the industry by attempting to start his own company, he runs into Jae-yi, a former training partner and rival, and Dok-go, a famous retired killer who was his mentor at MK. He soon realizes they’re all competing to become the number one assassin.

== Cast ==
- Yim Si-wan as Lee Han-ul / Mantis
- Park Gyu-young as Shin Jae-yi
- Jo Woo-jin as Dok-go
- Choi Hyun-wook as Benjamin Jo
- Bae Gang-hee as Yang Soo-min
- Hwang Seong-bin as Puma Lee
- Yoo Su-bin as Kim Dong-yeong
- Jeon Bae-soo as Nam Bae-soo
- Yang Dong-geun as Gwang-cheon / Bi-cheon
- Sul Kyung-gu as Cha Min-kyu
- Jeon Do-yeon as Gil Bok-soon

== Production ==
On September 2, 2024, Netflix confirmed the production of the action thriller film.

The film was shot over a five-month period, beginning on August 1, 2024, and concluding on December 20, 2024.

== Release ==
The film was released on Netflix on September 26, 2025.
