= I Wish I Had a Wife =

2001 film by Park Heung-sik

- Theatrical release poster
- Hangul: 나도 아내가 있었으면 좋겠다
- RR: Nado anaega isseosseumyeon joketda
- MR: Nado anaega issŏssŭmyŏn chok'etta
- Directed by: Park Heung-sik
- Written by: Choi Eun-yeong; Jang Hak-gyo
- Produced by: Kim Seon-a
- Starring: Jeon Do-yeon; Sul Kyung-gu
- Cinematography: Cho Yong-kyou
- Edited by: Hyun Kim
- Music by: Jo Sung-woo
- Production companies: Barunson E&A; Cinema Service; Sidus Pictures
- Release date: January 13, 2001 (South Korea)
- Running time: 106 minutes
- Country: South Korea
- Language: Korean

I Wish I Had a Wife (Korean: 나도 아내가 있었으면 좋겠다) is a 2001 South Korean romantic comedy-drama film directed by Park Heung-sik, starring Jeon Do-yeon and Sul Kyung-gu. The film is about a lonely banker, who, after realizing he has no one to call during a moment of crisis, unwittingly encounters a young woman who harbors a quiet affection for him.

== Plot ==
Bong-soo (Sul Kyung-Gu) has been working as manager of a small bank in an apartment complex for three years. During his three years there, 23 years if you count his school days, Bong-soo has never been late. However, he purposely decides to skip work one day. There is only one reason. Inside a subway train that has suddenly stopped on his way to work, everyone around him reaches for their cell phones to call someone. At that moment, he realized that he does not have a single person to call. He does not know that inside the educational center across the street from the bank where he works, a 27-year-old woman Won-ju (Jeon Do-Yeon) is looking over to him, nourishing a small love. Bong-soo and Won-ju run into each other every day, at the Ramen restaurant, at the bank, at the bus station.

All kinds of trivial incidents occur but Bong-soo still does not truly recognize Won-ju's presence. One day, while looking over the bank's CCTV tapes, Bong-soo discovers someone pitifully calling out his name to the small, closed-circuit camera that does not even record sound.

== Cast ==
- Jeon Do-yeon as Jeong Won-ju
- Sul Kyung-gu as Kim Bong-soo
- Jin Hee-kyung as Tae-ran

== Awards ==
2001 Baeksang Arts Awards

- Best Actress - Jeon Do-yeon
- Best New Director - Park Heung-sik
