= 1st Asia Pacific Screen Awards =

The 1st Asia Pacific Screen Awards were held in 2007. The first award ceremonies saw at least 18 film nominations. The Asia Pacific Screen Awards originated in the city of Brisbane, Australia. It is an international cultural program supported by the Brisbane City Council and powered by Brisbane Marketing. The Asia Pacific Screen Awards is endorsed by Paris-based UNESCO and FIAPF-International Federation of Film Producers Associations.

== Nominations ==
Film	Director	Country
Caramel	Nadine Labaki	Lebanon/France
Mongol	Sergei Bodrov	Germany/Mongolia
The Sun Also Rises	Jiang Wen	China
Village People Radio Show	Amir Muhammad	Malaysia
Summer Days with Coo	Keiichi Hara	Japan
Little Moth	Tao Peng	China
Hard-Hearted	Aleksei Mizgiryov	Russia
Mother Nanny	Veronia Velasco	Philippines
Lucky Miles	Michael James Rowland	Australia
Karoy	Zhanna Issabayeva	Kazakhstan
The Home Song Stories	Tony Ayres	Singapore/Australia
Requiem from Java	Garin Nugroho	Indonesia/Austria
Mukhsin	Yasmin Ahmad	Malaysia
The Go Master	Tian Zhuangzhuang	China/Japan
Cut and Paste	Hala Khalil	Egypt
Like a Virgin	Lee Hae-Jun	South Korea
Crossing the Dust	Shawkat Amin Korki	Iraq/France
A Story of People in War and Peace	Vardan Hovhannisyan	Armenia/United Kingdom

== Awards ==
Best Feature Film	Achievement in Directing
(South Korea) Secret Sunshine: (Indonesia) Opera Jawa; (Iran) The Night Bus; (Lebanon) Caramel; (Turkey) Takva: A Man's Fear of God	(Iran) Rakhshan Bani-E'temad, Mohsen Abdolvahab - Mainline: (China) Peng Tao - Little Moth; (Kazakhstan) Zhanna Issabayeva - Karoy; (Iraq) Shawkat Amin Korki - Crossing the Dust; (Lebanon) Nadine Labaki - Caramel
