= Choi Tae-young =

South Korean filmmaker (born 1971)

- 최태영
- Born: July 2, 1971 (age 55); South Korea
- Other names: Ralph Choi; Ralph Tae-young Choi
- Education: Department of Agricultural Economics of Korea University
- Occupations: Sound Designer; Filmmaker; Entertainment Executive
- Years active: 1997–present
- Employers: Korea Industrial Securities; Live Tones
- Organization: Korean Film Council (January 2020 to January 2022)

Korean name
- Hangul: 최태영
- RR: Choe Taeyeong
- MR: Ch'oe T'aeyŏng

Choi Tae-young (Korean: 최태영; born July 2, 1971), also known as Ralph Tae-young Choi, is a South Korean film sound designer the co-founder and CEO of Live Tone Studios. As South Korea's largest cinematic sound post-production facility, Live Tone has contributed to over 400 feature films and numerous high-profile streaming series, including Squid Game and Moving. They have also worked on Korea's highest-grossing films such as The Admiral: Roaring Currents, Along with the Gods: The Two Worlds, 12.12: The Day, The Host, Miracle in Cell No. 7, King and the Clown, Along with the Gods: The Last 49 Days, A Taxi Driver, Exhuma, Train to Busan, and The Attorney.

Choi is particularly noted for his long-term collaborations with visionary directors. He has provided the sound supervision for Bong's feature filmography, including Memories of Murder (2003), The Host (2006), Snowpiercer (2013), Okja (2017), and Parasite (2019). His extensive work with Kim Jee-woon spans two decades, from A Tale of Two Sisters (2003), to his work such as, A Bittersweet Life (2005), The Good, the Bad, the Weird (2008), I Saw the Devil (2010), The Age of Shadows (2016), and Cobweb (2023).

Choi, along with Livetone, has received 15 Grand Bell Award nominations, winning three for Save the Green Planet! (2003), Lump Sugar (2006), and War of the Arrows (2011). His international recognition grew significantly with Parasite (2019) for which he won one MPSE Golden Reel Award for Outstanding Achievement in Sound Editing. In 2020, Choi was invited to join the Academy of Motion Picture Arts and Sciences (AMPAS).

== Early life ==
Choi Tae-young first developed an interest in music during his high school years. He pursued a career as a recording engineer and even joined a band. However, the band disbanded in 1994 prior to releasing any album. He subsequently studied recording engineering at the Los Angeles Recording School in Los Angeles, California and took courses in music business and recording engineering at UCLA Extension. During this period, he identified film sound post-production as a career path.

== Career ==
=== Career beginning and establishment of Livetone ===
After returning to South Korea in 1996, Choi co-founded Livetone, a sound production studio. Initially handling all post-production tasks, Choi later specialized in mixing as the company grew. Livetone pioneered Dolby 5.1 channel film sound in Korea with Beat in 1997.

Choi began his career without formal training in film-specific sound engineering, initially focusing on high-fidelity technical reproduction. During the production of The Foul King (2000), director Kim Jee-woon rejected Choi's initial sound design for being technically over-refined and failing to match the film's comedic tone. Following this, Choi adjusted his methodology to prioritize script analysis and the director's subjective intent. In the climactic sequence of Kwak Kyung-taek's Friend (2001), Choi implemented his new approach by differentiating the sonic texture of repeated stabbing sounds. He varied the audio by alternating between the protagonist's internal perspective and the audience's external perspective, a departure from the standard practice of maintaining a consistent tone for foley effects. Later that year, Choi implemented Dolby 6.1 channel audio for the production of Volcano High.

Choi later stated that while the technical creation of complex sound effects is a routine task, the primary challenge of film sound lies in its subjectivity. He defines his role as translating a director's imagination into an objective audio experience through the precise timing and placement of sound.

For Kim Jee-woon's A Bittersweet Life (2005), Choi and sound designer Lee Seung-yeop utilized field-recorded audio to achieve a realistic soundscape. The team captured location-specific ambient sounds in Seoul and used live ammunition at Yangsu-ri Studio for ballistic authenticity. The film was mixed in Dolby Digital Surround EX (6.1). During this period, Choi also served as the sound supervisor for Typhoon (2005).

At the 44th Grand Bell Awards in 2007, Choi received Sound Effect Award nominations for four of his projects: The Host, For Horowitz, and The Restless, and Lump Sugar. He won the award for Lump Sugar alongside his partner, Jeong Kwang-ho.

For the 2011 film War of the Arrows, Choi utilized a Dolby 7.1 surround mix. He collaborated with the American foley firm Sound Dogs to record ballistic audio in the Palm Springs desert, chosen for its low ambient noise. Using a nine-microphone array and a professional archer, the team recorded variations in the sonic profile of arrows based on trajectory and velocity. This audio was later integrated with 4D sound technology for theatrical screenings.

The 2013 film Mr. Go was the first South Korean production to use Dolby Atmos. This object-based format allowed individual sounds to be manipulated as independent objects within a three-dimensional space. The project involved a collaboration with Sony PCL for 3D mixing and high-resolution audio. To manage the spatial positioning of digital characters, Choi worked with Wavell CEO Lee Jeong-jin to develop sound sources compatible with the Atmos environment.

For The Admiral: Roaring Currents (2014), Choi developed specialized audio for the film's naval vessels. To simulate the movement of ships without power plants, he incorporated twisting sounds that mimicked external pressure on large trees. In his work on Tunnel (2016), Choi utilized layered audio to depict the structural collapse of the film's central setting.

=== Collaborations with Bong Joon-ho ===
Choi has served as the sound designer for every feature film in Bong Joon Ho's career, a partnership that began with Barking Dogs Never Bite (2000). During the production of Memories of Murder (2003), Choi moved away from standard industry mixing protocols to adopt a more conceptual approach requested by the director. This change involved the use of layered environmental audio and specific rain foley to create a non-traditional sonic atmosphere.

For the 2006 film The Host, Choi and Live Tone collaborated with the American sound recording firm Sound Dogs to develop the creature's sonic profile. The final audio was a hybrid construction using primary vocalizations derived from sea lion recordings. At the request of the director, Choi integrated human vocal elements provided by actor Oh Dal-su for specific character sounds. These human-sourced recordings were used for the creature's snoring and the noises associated with it consuming prey.

The 2013 science fiction film Snowpiercer, an international co-production, was mixed in Dolby 7.1 surround sound over a six-month period.While original plans called for the audio to be finalized in the United States, sound supervision was reassigned to Choi and Live Tone late in the production cycle. This shift required a reorganization of the sound team to accommodate the film's global release schedule. Due to budget constraints and the expedited timeline, the sound effects and final post-production were completed at Live Tone's facilities in South Korea rather than at an American studio.

For the 2017 film Okja, Choi developed the vocalizations for the titular genetically modified creature using a hybrid foley technique. The creature's sonic palette was constructed by layering high-fidelity recordings of pigs, hippopotamuses, and rhinoceroses captured in New Zealand. These animal sounds were blended with human vocal tracks provided by actress Lee Jung-eun to facilitate the creature's characterization.

Audio post-production for Parasite was conducted at Live Tone Studios over a twelve-week period beginning in December 2018. The schedule included eight weeks for sound editing and recording, two weeks for pre-dubbing, and a two-week final mix in Dolby Atmos completed in February 2019.

The studio's mixing workflow centered on two AMS Neve DFC 3D digital film consoles, utilizing their stem routing and automation systems to manage the film's spatial requirements. This technical setup allowed for the precise placement of sound objects within a three dimensional field to contrast the environments of the two central families. For the Park residence, the soundscape focused on clean, expansive acoustics, while the Kim family's apartment utilized low frequency environmental noise and air circulation sounds to suggest a confined space.

Choi's and his team, including Young Kang-hye, Kim Byung-in, Park Sung-gyun, Lee Chung-gyu, and Shin Yi-na, were awarded the MPSE Golden Reel Awards for Outstanding Achievement in Sound Editing – Foreign Language Feature for their work on the critically acclaimed film Parasite (2019).

In 2021, Choi with other Korean film industry sound masters, were attending the 22nd Jeonju International Film Festival.

=== Streaming series and films ===
With the rise of global OTT platforms, Choi has become a vocal advocate for elevating South KoChoi has advocated for the adoption of global audio standards in the South Korean industry, noting the requirement for 5.1 Surround or Dolby Atmos delivery on platforms such as Netflix and Disney+. In the Netflix series Kingdom, Choi developed a distinct sonic identity for the "K-zombie," focusing on aggressive, high-velocity foley to differentiate them from the slower-paced archetypes of Western cinema. Choi noted that the success of Squid Game (2021) established a "K-sound" trend, proving that high-fidelity audio is essential for the global viability of Korean content.

In 2023, Livetone handled the sound supervision for the Disney+ original series Moving. Under the direction of sound supervisor Kang Hye-young, the studio developed a specialized sonic palette for the show's diverse superpowers. This included high-frequency synthesized layers to represent electrical currents and complex three-dimensional panning for flight sequences. This project marked Livetone's first full-scale collaboration with Disney+, further integrating the studio into the global streaming production ecosystem.

In 2018, Choi (representing Dexter Livetone) and Ryu Jae-rim (Director of the Korean Film Archive) signed a landmark agreement at the Sound Master Data Donation Ceremony in Seoul. Under this pact, Livetone donated over 200 original analog and digital sound pieces for permanent preservation. The Archive has since integrated these materials into its digitization workflow to support future film restoration projects. Additionally, Livetone partnered with the Seoul Business Agency (SBA) to bolster the domestic content industry. This collaboration utilized the SBA Media Content Center's infrastructure and Livetone's technical expertise to provide post-production support for short films, documentaries, and high-end Dolby Atmos productions.

For the 2023 film The Moon, Choi collaborated with director Kim Yong-hwa on a highly technical audio reconstruction. Due to on-set noise interference, approximately 99.9% of the film's audio—including dialogue and ambient textures—was recreated in post-production using foley and sound effects. The project utilized roughly 700 sound channels, the largest scale in Choi's career, and required over a year of production.

In Exhuma, Choi and the Livetone team integrated Dolby Atmos from the pre-production stage, coordinating sound design with Dexter Studios' color grading to maintain environmental consistency.

For the historical drama 12.12: The Day, the sound team focused on period-accurate realism through extensive field recordings. Choi utilized foley work to distinguish the sounds of specific military equipment, including various types of boots, armored vehicles, and artillery. The mixing process consisted of two months of standard mixing followed by one month of specialized Dolby Atmos pre-mixing and finalization. Choi cited his personal background in a military band as a reference for the film's sonic spatiality.

In 2023, Choi signed a Memorandum of Understanding (MOU) with Supertone to collaborate on sound technology research at Livetone's Sangam-dong headquarters.

Regarding the Alienoid: Return to the Future franchise, Choi prioritized "sound coherence" to bridge the two installments. While the first film focused on establishing the narrative framework, the second part, Return to the Future, shifted toward a character-driven soundscape to emphasize emotional immersion.

== Filmography ==
=== Short films ===
Short film credits
Year	Title		Director	Notes	Ref.
Year	English	Original	Director	Notes	Ref.
2002	Three – "Memories"	쓰리; Thai: อารมณ์ อาถรรพณ์ อาฆาต; Chinese: 三更	Kim Jee-woon	Sound Dept.-Sound Mixer/Sound Designers	
2009	Five Senses of Eros — Segment His Concern	오감도	Daniel H. Byun; Hur Jin-ho; Yoo Young-sik; Min Kyu-dong; Oh Ki-hwan	Sound Supervisor/Re-recording mixer	
2013	One Perfect Day	사랑의 가위바위보	Kim Jee-woon	Re-recording Mixer/3d Sound Supervisor	
2013	The X	더 엑스	Kim Jee-woon	Sound, Re-recording Mixer/3D Sound Supervisor	
2020	Untact	언택트	Kim Jee-woon	Executive Supervisor	

=== Film ===
Film making credit
Year	Title		Director	Role
Year	English	Korean	Director	Role
1997	Beat	비트	Kim Sung-su	Sound department
1997	High-grade Player	고수	Kim Chun-sik	Sound Recording
1997	Motel Cactus	모텔 선인장	Park Ki-yong	Sound Recording
1997	Deep Sorrow	깊은 슬픔	Kwak Ji-kyun	Sound editor
1997	Bad Movie	나쁜 영화	Jang Seon-woo	Sound editor
1998	Christmas in August	8월의 크리스마스	Hur Jin-ho	Sound engineer
1998	Dr. K	닥터 K	Kwak Kyung-taek	Sound mixing
1998	Saturday, 2 p.m	토요일 오후2시	Min Byung-jin	Sound engineer
1998	Girls' Night Out	처녀들의 저녁식사	Im Sang-soo	Sound engineer
1998	Tie a Yellow Ribbon	찜	Han Ji-seung	Recording
1998	The Happenings	기막힌 사내들	Jang Jin	Sound Recording
1998	The Power of Kangwon Province	강원도의 힘	Hong Sang-soo	Mixing
1998	The Harmonium in My Memory	내 마음의 풍금	Lee Young-jae	Mixing
1999	Dance Dance	댄스 댄스	Moon Sung-wook	Sound Designer
1999	The Happy Funeral Director	행복한 장의사	Jang Moon-il	Sound engineer
1999	Yonggary	용가리	Shim Hyung-rae	Re-recording Mixer, Sound Effects Editor, Foley Recording Engineer
1999	The Rush	질주	Lee Sang-in	Pre-mixing
1999	City of the Rising Sun	태양은 없다	Kim Sung-su	Mixing
1999	Nowhere to Hide	인정사정 볼것 없다	Lee Myung-se	Mixing
1999	The Great Chef	북경반점	Kim Eui-seok	Mixing
1999	The Mystery of the Cube	건축무한 육면각체의 비밀	Yu Sang-wook	Recording
1999	A Growing Business	신장개업	Kim Seong-hong	Sound
1999	Spooky School	학교전설	Kim Hyun-myeong	Mixing
2000	Tears	눈물	Im Sang-soo	Mixing
2000	Il Mare	시월애	Lee Hyun-seung	Sound mixing
2000	Virgin Stripped Bare by Her Bachelors	오! 수정	Hong Sang-soo	Mixing
2000	The Cut Runs Deep	컷 런스 딥	John H. Lee	
2000	The Foul King	반칙왕	Kim Jee-woon	Mixing
2000	Barking Dogs Never Bite	플란다스의 개	Bong Joon-ho	Mixing
2000	Anarchists	아나키스트	Yoo Young-sik	Mixing
2000	Just Do It	하면 된다	Park Dae-young	Mixing
2000	I Wish I Had a Wife	나도 아내가 있었으면 좋겠다	Park Heung-sik	Mixing
2000	Why Do I Want to Be a Boxing Referee?	나는 왜 권투심판이 되려 하는가?	Choi Ik-hwan	Mixing
2000	Ditto	동감	Kim Jung-kwon	Sound
2000	Kilimanjaro	킬리만자로	Oh Seung-wook	Mixing
2001	Failan	파이란	Song Hae-sung	Mixing/Sound designer
2001	Mago	마고	Kang Hyun-il	Re-Recording Mixer, Sound Designer, Mixing
2001	Wanee & Junah	와니와 준하	Kim Yong-gyun	Sound Team/Mixing/Sound Effects
2001	Running 7 Dogs	7인의 새벽	Kim Joo-man	Mixing
2001	Friend	친구	Kwak Kyung-taek	Re-Recording Mixer/Sound Designer
2001	Guns & Talks	킬러들의 수다	Jang Jin	Mixing
2001	Kiss Me Much	베사메무쵸	Jeon Yoon-soo	Mixing, Sound Design
2001	Summer Time	썸머타임	Park Jae-ho	Mixing
2001	Dream of a Warrior	천사몽	Park Hee-joon	Sound & Mixing
2001	Hi! Dharma!	달마야 놀자	Park Cheol-kwan	Sound Designer, Re-Recording Mixer
2001	I Love You	아이 러브 유	Moon Hee-yong	Mixing
2001	Musa	무사	Kim Sung-su	
2001	Volcano High	화산고	Kim Tae-kyun	Re-Recording Mixer/Sound Designer
2002	No Blood No Tears	피도 눈물도 없이	Ryoo Seung-wan	Re-Recording Mixer/Sound Designer
2002	Champion	챔피언	Kwak Kyung-taek	Re-Recording Mixer/Mixing Engineer
2002	The Phone	폰	Ahn Byeong-ki	Re-Recording Mixer
2002	Marriage Is a Crazy Thing	결혼은 미친 짓이다	Yoo Ha	Re-Recording Mixer
2002	Jungle Juice	정글쥬스	Cho Min-ho	Re-Recording Mixer/Sound Designer
2002	Oasis	오아시스	Lee Chang-dong	Re-Recording Mixer
2002	Lovers' Concerto	연애소설	Lee Han	Mixing
2002	No Comment Family	묻지마 패밀리	Park Sang-won, Bae Jong, Lee Hyun-jong	Re-Recording Mixer
2002	Unborn but Forgotten	하얀방	Lim Chang-jae	Re-Recording Mixer
2002	Moneymong	마니몽	Kim Won-dae	Sound
2002	No. 815	광복절 특사	Kim Sang-jin	Re-recording Mixer
2002	Saving My Hubby	굳세어라 금순아	Hyun Nam-seop	
2002	Jail Breakers	광복절 특사	Kim Sang-jin	Sound department
2002	Oh! LaLa Sisters	울랄라 시스터즈	Park Je-hyun	Re-recording mixer
2003	Oh! Happy Day	오! 해피데이	Yoon Hak-yeol	Sound/Re-recording mixer
2003	Au Revoir, UFO	안녕! 유에프오	Kim Jin-min	Re-recording mixer
2003	Elysium	엘리시움	Kwon Jae-woong	Re-recording mixer
2003	My Wife Is a Gangster 2	조폭 마누라 2 - 돌아온 전설	Jeong Heung-soon	Re-recording mixer
2003	A Tale of Two Sisters	장화, 홍련	Kim Jee-woon	Sound/Re-recording mixer
2003	Mutt Boy	똥개	Kwak Kyung-taek	Sound/Re-recording mixer
2003	Acacia	아카시아	Park Ki-hyung	Sound/Re-recording mixer
2003	Crazy First Love	첫사랑 사수 궐기대회	Oh Jong-rok	Sound/Re-recording mixer
2003	Save the Green Planet!	지구를 지켜라!	Jang Joon-hwan	Sound
2003	Tube	튜브	Baek Un-hak	Sound/Re-recording mixer
2003	Into the Mirror	거울 속으로	Kim Sung-ho	Sound
2003	Memories of Murder	살인의 추억	Bong Joon-ho	Sound
2003	Please Teach Me English	영어완전정복	Kim Sung-su	Sound/Re-recording mixer
2003	Once upon a Time in a Battlefield	황산벌	Lee Joon-ik	Sound/Re-recording mixer
2003	Mudang: Reconciliation Between The Living and The Dead	영매-산자와 죽은자의 화해	Park Ki-bok	Sound
2003	Singles	싱글즈	Kwon Chil-in	Sound/Re-recording mixer
2003	A Man Who Went to Mars	화성으로 간 사나이	Kim Jeong-gwon	Sound/Re-recording mixer
2004	How to Keep My Love	내 남자의 로맨스	Park Je-hyun	
2004	Two Guys	투 가이즈	Park Heon-soo	
2004	Family	가족	Lee Jung-cheol	
2004	Ghost House	귀신이 산다	Kim Sang-jin	
2004	Love is a Crazy Thing	연애(연애는 미친짓이다)	Oh Seok-geun	
2004	Jenny, Juno	제니, 주노	Kim Ho-jun	
2004	My Mother, the Mermaid	인어공주	Park Heung-sik	
2004	Rikidozan: A Hero extraordinary	역도산(力道山)	Song Hae-sung	
2004	Once Upon a Time in High School	말죽거리 잔혹사	Yoo Ha	
2004	When I Turned Nine	아홉살 인생	Yoon In-ho	
2004	Woman Is the Future of Man	여자는 남자의 미래다	Hong Sang-soo	
2004	A Moment to Remember	내 머리속의 지우개	John H. Lee	
2004	Bunshinsaba	분신사바	Ahn Byeong-ki	
2004	Mr. Gam's Victory	슈퍼스타 감사용	Kim Jong-hyun	Sound/Re-recording mixer
2004	Shin Suk-gi Blues	신석기 블루스	Kim Do-hyeok	
2004	Someone Special	아는 여자	Jang Jin	
2004	Dance with the Wind	바람의 전설	Park Jung-woo	
2004	Dead Friend	령	Kim Tae-gyeong, Lee In-gyu	
2005	The Wig	가발	Won Sin-yeon	Sound
2005	Antarctic Journal	남극일기	Yim Pil-sung	Sound Supervisor/Re-recording mixer
2005	All for Love	내 생애 가장 아름다운 일주일	Min Kyu-dong	
2005	The Rainy Day	열번째 비가 내리는 날	Min Doo-sik	Sound Supervisor
2005	Soldiers of Heaven	천군	Min Jun-gi	Sound Supervisor
2005	April Snow	외출	Hur Jin-ho	
2005	Princess Aurora	오로라공주	Bang Eun-jin	
2005	King and the Clown	왕의 남자	Lee Joon-ik	Sound Supervisor
2005	Diary of June	6월의 일기	Im Kyeong-soo	Sound Supervisor
2005	Bravo, My Life	사랑해, 말순씨	Park Heung-sik	
2005	Running Wild	야수	Kim Sung-su	Sound Supervisor
2005	Typhoon	태풍	Kwak Kyung-taek	Sound Supervisor
2005	A Bittersweet Life	달콤한 인생	Kim Jee-woon	Sound Supervisor
2005	Holiday	홀리데이	Yang Yun-ho	
2005	Rules of Dating	연애의 목적	Han Jae-rim	
2005	Murder, Take One	박수칠 때 떠나라	Jang Jin	
2006	Now and Forever	연리지	Kim Sung-joong	Sound Supervisor, Re-Recording Mixer
2006	Almost Love	청춘만화	Lee Han	
2006	Love Phobia	도마뱀	Kang Ji-eun	Sound supervisor
2006	Over the Border	국경의 남쪽	Ahn Pan-seok	
2006	For Horowitz	호로비츠를 위하여	Kwon Hyung-jin	
2006	A Dirty Carnival	비열한 거리	Yoo Ha	
2006	APT	아파트	Ahn Byeong-ki	
2006	February 29–4 Horror Tales	2월 29일 – 어느날 갑자기 첫번째 이야기	Ahn Byeong-ki	
2006	The Host	괴물	Bong Joon-ho	Sound supervisor
2006	Forbidden Floor - 4 Horror Tales	네번째 층 – 어느 날 갑자기 두번째 이야기	Ahn Byeong-ki	
2006	Lump Sugar	각설탕	Lee Hwan-kyung	Sound Supervisor
2006	No Mercy for the Rude	예의없는 것들	Park Cheol-hee	
2006	Roommates - 4 Horror Tales	D-day – 어느 날 갑자기 세번째 이야기	Ahn Byeong-ki	
2006	Dark Forest - 4 Horror Tales	죽음의 숲 – 어느 날 갑자기 네번째 이야기	Ahn Byeong-ki	
2006	Three Fellas	뚝방전설	Jo Beom-gu	Sound supervisor
2006	Maundy Thursday	우리들의 행복한 시간	Song Hae-sung	Sound Supervisor
2006	Righteous Ties	거룩한 계보	Jang Jin	
2006	Cruel Winter Blues	열혈남아	Lee Jung-beom	
2006	The Restless	중천	Kim Sung-su	
2007	A Good Day to Have an Affair	바람피기 좋은 날	Jang Mun-il	
2007	A Love	사랑	Kwak Kyung-taek	
2007	My Son	아들	Jang Jin	
2007	Rainbow Eyes	가면	Yang Yun-ho	
2007	Mother doesn't Die	어머니는 죽지 않는다	Hah Myung-joong	
2007	Bunt	날아라 허동구	Park Gyu-tae	
2007	Shadows in the Palace	궁녀	Kim Mi-jung	
2007	Punch Lady	펀치 레이디	Kang Hyo-jin	
2007	Going by the Book	바르게 살자	Ra Hee-chan	
2007	My Eleventh Mother	열한번째 엄마	Kim Jin-sung	
2007	Hansel and Gretel	헨젤과 그레텔	Yim Pil-sung	
2008	The Chaser	추격자	Na Hong-jin	
2008	Public Enemy Returns	강철중: 공공의 적 1-1	Jang Jin	
2008	Happiness	행복	Hur Jin-ho	
2008	Crush and Blush	미쓰 홍당무	Lee Kyoung-mi	
2008	Do Re Mi Fa So La Ti Do	도레미파솔라시도	Kang Gun-hyang	
2008	The Good, the Bad, the Weird	좋은 놈, 나쁜 놈, 이상한 놈	Kim Jee-woon	
2008	Scandal Makers	과속스캔들	Kang Hyeong-cheol	
2008	Antique	서양골동양과자점 앤티크	Min Kyu-dong	
2008	A Frozen Flower	쌍화점	Yoo Ha	
2009	Secret Reunion	의형제	Jang Hoon	
2009	In My End Is My Beginning	끝과 시작	Min Kyu-dong	
2009	Mother	마더	Bong Joon-ho	
2009	Tidal Wave	해운대	Yoon Je-kyun	
2009	Good Morning, President	굿모닝 프레지던트	Jang Jin	
2009	Lifting King Kong	킹콩을 들다	Park Gun-yong	Sound Supervisor
2009	Chaw	차우	Shin Jung-won	Audio Post Production
2009	Handphone	핸드폰	Kim Han-min	
2010	Parallel Life	평행이론	Kwon Ho-young	
2010	The Quiz Show Scandal	퀴즈 왕	Jang Jin	
2010	Foxy Festival	페스티발	Lee Ha-yeong	
2010	I Saw the Devil	악마를 보았다	Kim Jee-woon	
2010	The Recipe	된장	Lee Seo-gun	Sound Supervisor
2010	Death Bell 2: Bloody Camp	고死 두번째 이야기 : 교생실습	Yoo Sun-dong	
2010	A Better Tomorrow	무적자	Song Hae-sung	
2010	Man of Vendetta	파괴된 사나이	Woo Min-ho	Sound Supervisor
2010	Grand Prix	그랑프리	Yang Yun-ho	Sound Supervisor
2010	Haunters	초능력자	Kim Min-seok	
2010	The Yellow Sea	황해	Na Hong-jin	
2011	Battlefield Heroes	평양성	Lee Joon-ik	
2011	Howling	하울링	Yoo Ha	
2011	Romantic Heaven	로맨틱 헤븐	Jang Jin	
2011	Sunny	써니	Kang Hyeong-cheol	
2011	Moby Dick	모비딕	Park In-je	
2011	The Cat	고양이: 죽음을 보는 두 개의 눈	Byun Seung-wook	
2011	War of the Arrows	최종병기 활	Kim Han-min	
2011	S.I.U.	특수본	Hwang Byung-guk	
2012	Bunshinsaba	笔仙	Ahn Byeong-ki	
2012	Mr. XXX-Kisser	아부의 왕	Jeong Seung-gu	
2012	Dangerous Liaisons	위험한 관계	Hur Jin-ho	
2012	Doomsday Book	인류멸망보고서	Yim Pil-sung; Kim Jee-woon	
2013	Miracle in Cell No. 7	7번방의 선물	Lee Hwan-kyung	
2013	Running Man	런닝맨	Jo Dong-oh	
2013	Bunshinsaba 2	笔仙 2	Ahn Byeong-ki	
2013	Mr. Go	미스터 고	Kim Yong-hwa	Re-recording MIX / 3D Sound Mix
2013	Boomerang Family	고령화 가족	Song Hae-sung	Sound Supervisor, Re-Recording Mixer
2013	Cold Eyes	감시자들	Cho Ui-seok, Kim Byung-seo	Sound Supervisor, Re-Recording Mixer, 3D Sound Producer
2013	Snowpiercer	설국열차	Bong Joon-ho	
2013	Flu	감기	Kim Sung-su	
2013	The Face Reader	관상	Han Jae-rim	
2013	Top Star	톱스타	Park Joong-hoon	Sound Supervisor, Re-Recording Mixer
2013	The Attorney	변호인	Yang Woo-suk	
2013	Secretly, Greatly	은밀하게 위대하게	Jang Cheol-soo	3D Sound Producer
2014	The Plan Man	플랜맨	Seong Si-heub	Sound Supervisor/Re-Recording Mixer
2014	Miss Granny	수상한 그녀	Hwang Dong-hyuk	Sound Supervisor
2014	Man on High Heels	하이힐	Jang Jin	
2014	Sea Fog	해무	Shim Sung-bo	
2014	We Are Brothers	우리는 형제입니다	Jang Jin	
2014	Bunshinsaba 3	笔仙 3	Ahn Byeong-ki	
2014	The Admiral: Roaring Currents	명량	Kim Han-min	
2014	Perfect Proposal	은밀한 유혹	Yoon Jae-gu	
2014	Tazza: The Hidden Card	타짜: 신의 손	Kang Hyeong-cheol	
2014	My Brilliant Life	두근두근 내 인생	E J-yong	
2014	Confession	좋은 친구들	Lee Do-yoon	
2014	The Royal Tailor	상의원	Lee Won-suk	
2015	A Melody to Remember	오빠생각	Lee Han	
2015	Bling		Lee Kyung-ho, Lee Won-jae	Final Mixing
2015	The Sea I Wished for	바라던 바다	Jang Jin	
2015	The Truth Beneath	비밀은 없다	Lee Kyoung-mi	Sound Supervisor/Re-recording Mixer
2015	The Priests	검은 사제들	Jang Jae-hyun	
2015	Love, Lies	해어화	Park Heung-sik	Sound Supervisor/Re-Recording Mixer
2015	The Princess and the Matchmaker	궁합	Hong Chang-pyo	
2015	The Throne	사도	Lee Joon-ik	
2015	The Accidental Detective	탐정: 더 비기닝	Kim Jung-hoon	
2016	SORI: Voice from the Heart	로봇, 소리	Lee Ho-jae	
2016	Pure Love	순정	Lee Eun-hee	
2016	Train to Busan	부산행	Yeon Sang-ho	
2016	The Age of Shadows	밀정	Kim Jee-woon	Sound Supervisor/Re-Recording Mixer
2016	Scandal Maker	과속스캔들	Kang Hyeong-cheol	
2016	Tunnel	터널	Kim Seong-hun	
2016	Pandora	판도라	Park Jung-woo	Sound Supervisor/Re-Recording Mixer
2016	Split	스플릿	Choi Kook-hee	Sound Supervisor/Re-Recording Mixer
2016	Master	마스터	Joh Ui-seok	
2017	The Mayor	특별시민	Park In-je	
2017	Reset	逆时营救	Chang	
2017	Okja	옥자	Bong Joon-ho	Supervising Sound Editors/Re-Recording Mixer
2017	A Taxi Driver	택시운전사	Jang Hoon	
2017	The Fortress	남한산성	Hwang Dong-hyuk	
2017	A Special Lady	미옥	Lee An-gyu	
2017	Along with the Gods: The Two Worlds	신과함께: 죄와 벌	Kim Yong-hwa	Supervising Sound Editors/Re-Recording Mixer
2017	Man of Will	대장 김창수	Lee Won-tae	
2017	Anarchist from Colony	박열	Lee Joon-ik	
2017	Conspiracy: Age of Rebellion	역모 - 반란의 시대	Kim Hong-sun	Sound
2017	The Swindler	꾼	Jang Chang-won	
2018	Psychokinesis	염력	Yeon Sang-ho	
2018	Heung-boo: The Revolutionist	흥부: 글로 세상을 바꾼 자	Cho Geun-hyun	
2018	Golden Slumber	골든슬럼버	Noh Dong-seok	
2018	Default	국가부도의 날	Choi Kook-hee	
2018	Champion	챔피언	Kim Yong-wan	
2018	Sunset in My Hometown	변산	Lee Joon-ik	
2018	On Your Wedding Day	너의 결혼식	Lee Seok-geun	
2018	Fengshui	명당 (明堂)	Park Hee-gon	
2018	Along with the Gods: The Last 49 Days	신과함께: 인과 연	Kim Yong-hwa	
2018	Love+Sling	레슬러	Kim Dae-woong	
2018	Illang: The Wolf Brigade	인랑	Kim Jee-woon	
2018	Take Point	PMC: 더 벙커	Kim Byung-woo	Mixing, sound
2018	Swing Kids	스윙키즈	Kang Hyeong-cheol	
2019	Svaha: The Sixth Finger	사바하	Jang Jae-hyun	
2019	Parasite	기생충	Bong Joon-ho	
2019	The King's Letters	나랏말싸미	Jo Chul-hyun	
2019	Crazy Romance	가장 보통의 연애	Kim Han-gyeol	
2019	Kim Ji-young: Born 1982	82년생 김지영	Kim Do-young	Sound
2019	Ashfall	백두산	Lee Hae-jun	
2020	The Man Standing Next	남산의 부장들	Woo Min-ho	
2020	#Alive	#살아있다	Cho Il-hyung	
2020	Deliver Us from Evil	다만 악에서 구하소서	Hong Won-chan	Sound Supervisor/Re-recording Mixer
2020	Samjin Company English Class	삼진그룹 영어토익반	Lee Jong-pil	
2020	Best Friend	이웃사촌	Lee Hwan-kyung	
2020	Kingdom: Ashin of the North	킹덤: 아신전	Kim Seong-hun	Executive Supervisor
2021	Space Sweepers	승리호	Jo Sung-hee	
2021	The Box	더 박스	Yang Jung-woong	Sound Supervisor
2021	Escape from Mogadishu	모가디슈	Ryoo Seung-wan	
2021	The Cursed: Dead Man's Prey	방법: 재차의	Kim Yong-wan	Re-recording Mixer
2022	Seoul Vibe	서울대작전	Moon Hyun-sung	Executive Sound Supervisor
2022	Broker	브로커	Hirokazu Kore-eda	Sound Supervisor/Re-Recording Mixer
2022	Alienoid	외계+인	Choi Dong-hoon	Supervising Sound Editors/Re-Recording Mixer
2022	Love and Leashes	모럴센스	Park Hyun-jin	Executive Sound Supervisor
2022	Carter	카터	Jung Byung-gil	Executive Sound Supervisor
2022	Life Is Beautiful	인생은 아름다워	Choi Kook-hee	
2023	Count	카운트	Kwon Hyuk-jae	
2023	The Moon	더 문	Kim Yong-hwa	Sound Supervisor/Re-Recording Mixer
2023	Cobweb	거미집	Kim Jee-woon	
2023	Kill Boksoon	길복순	Byun Sung-hyun	Executive Sound Supervisor
2023	12.12: The Day	서울의 봄	Kim Sung-su	Sound Supervisor/Re-Recording Mixer
2024	Alienoid: Return to the Future	외계+인 2부	Choi Dong-hoon	Supervising Sound Editors/Re-Recording Mixer
2024	Dead Man	데드맨	Ha Joon-won	Sound Supervisor/Re-Recording Mixer
2024	The Plot	설계자	Lee Yo-sup	Sound Supervisor/Re-Recording Mixer
2024	Following	그녀가 죽었다	Kim Se-hwi	Mixing, Sound
2024	Project Silence	프로젝트 사일런스	Kim Tae-gon	Sound

=== Web series ===
Web series credit
Year	Title		Role	Director	Ref.
Year	English	Korean	Role	Director	Ref.
2020	Kingdom	킹덤	Sound supervisor	Park In-je	
2021–2024	Squid Game	오징어 게임	Sound supervisor	Hwang Dong-hyuk	
2021	Dr. Brain	Dr. 브레인	Sound supervisor	Kim Jee-woon	
2021	The Silent Sea	고요의 바다	Sound supervisor	Choi Hang-yong	
2022	A Model Family	모범가족	Sound supervisor	Kim Jin-woo	
2022	Juvenile Justice	소년 심판	Sound supervisor	Hong Jong-chan	
2023	Black Knight	택배기사	Sound supervisor	Cho Ui-seok	
2023	Mask Girl	마스크걸	Sound supervisor	Kim Yong-hoon	
2023	Moving	무빙	Sound supervisor	Park In-je	
2024	The Bequeathed	선산	Sound supervisor	Yeon Sang-ho	
2024	Hierarchy	하이라키	Sound supervisor	Bae Hyeon-jin	

== Accolades ==
=== Awards and nominations ===
Awards and nominations
Award	Year	Category	Recipient(s)	Result	Ref.
12th Asian Film Awards	2017	Best Sound	The Fortress; Choi Tae-young	Nominated	
51st Asia-Pacific Film Festival	2006	Best Sound Effects	The Host; Choi Tae-young	Won	
58th Asia-Pacific Film Festival	2013	Best Sound Effects	Snowpiercer; Choi Tae-young	Won	
60th Baeksang Arts Awards	2024	Technical Award	Exhuma; Kim Byung-in (Sound)	Won	
11th Chunsa Film Art Awards	2003	Technical Award	Once Upon a Time in a Battlefield; Choi Tae-young	Won	
16th Chunsa Film Art Awards	2008	Technical Award	The Chaser; Choi Tae-young	Won	
20th Chunsa Film Art Awards	2015	Technical Award	The Admiral: Roaring Currents; Choi Tae-young	Won	
40th Grand Bell Awards	2003	Best Sound Effects	Save the Green Planet! Livetones; Choi Tae-young	Won	
41st Grand Bell Awards	2004	Best Sound Effects	A Tale of Two Sisters; Choi Tae-Young; Kang Kyung-han	Nominated	
42nd Grand Bell Awards	2005	Best Sound Effects	A Bittersweet Life; Kim Kyung-taek, Choi Tae-young	Nominated	
42nd Grand Bell Awards	2005	Best Sound Effects	Antarctic Journal; Kim Young-mun; Choi Tae-young	Nominated	
43rd Grand Bell Awards	2006	Best Sound Effects	Typhoon; Jung Kwang-ho, Choi Tae-young	Nominated	
43rd Grand Bell Awards	2006	Best Sound Effects	King and the Clown; Kim Tan-young; Choi Tae-young	Nominated	
44th Grand Bell Awards	2007	Best Sound Effects	Lump Sugar; Jung Kwang-ho, Choi Tae-young	Won	
44th Grand Bell Awards	2007	Best Sound Effects	The Restless; Kim Kyung-taek; Choi Tae-young	Nominated	
44th Grand Bell Awards	2007	Best Sound Effects	For Horowitz; Ryu Hyeon; Choi Tae-young	Nominated	
44th Grand Bell Awards	2007	Best Sound Effects	The Host; Lee Seung-chul; Choi Tae-young	Nominated	
48th Grand Bell Awards	2011	Best Sound Effects	War of the Arrows; Choi Tae-young	Won	
48th Grand Bell Awards	2011	Best Sound Effects	The Yellow Sea; Choi Tae-young	Nominated	
54th Grand Bell Awards	2017	Best Technical Award	Pandora	Nominated	
1st Korean Film Awards	2002	Sound Award	Volcano High; Live Tone	Won	
2nd Korean Film Awards	2003	Acoustic Award	A Tale of Two Sisters; Choi Tae-young, Kang Kyung-han	Won	
2nd Korean Film Awards	2003	Sound Award	Memories of Murder	Nominated	
2nd Korean Film Awards	2003	Sound Award	Tube	Nominated	
4th Korean Film Awards	2005	Sound Award	The Wig	Nominated	
4th Korean Film Awards	2005	Sound Award	Antarctic Journal	Nominated	
5th Korean Film Awards	2006	Best Sound	The Host; Choi Tae-young	Won	
7th Korean Film Awards	2008	Best Sound	The Good, the Bad, the Weird; Kim Kyung-taek, Choi Tae-young	Won	
8th Korean Film Awards	2010	Sound Award	A Bittersweet Life; Kim Kyung-taek, Choi Tae-young	Won	
8th Korean Film Awards	2010	Technology Award	A Bittersweet Life; Kim Kyung-taek, Choi Tae-young	Nominated	
2nd Korean Film Producers Association Awards	2015	Sound Award	The Throne; Choi Tae-young	Won	
4th Korean Film Producers Association Awards	2017	Sound Award	The Fortress; Choi Tae-young	Won	
Motion Picture Sound Editors Golden Reel Awards	2020	Feature - Foreign Language	Parasite: Choi Tae-young (Supervising Sound Editor); Kang Hye-young (Sound Designer, Sound Effects Editor); Kim Byung-in (Supervising ADR Editor); Park Sung-gyun (Foley Artist); Lee Chung-gyu (Foley Artist); Shin I-na (Foley Editor)	Won	
