= 27th Blue Dragon Film Awards =

2006 edition of award ceremony

- Date: December 15, 2006
- Site: KBS Hall, Yeouido, Seoul, South Korea
- Hosted by: Jung Joon-ho; Kim Hye-soo

Television coverage
- Network: KBS

The 27th Blue Dragon Film Awards ceremony was held on December 15, 2006 at the KBS Hall in Yeouido, Seoul, South Korea. Hosted by actors Jung Joon-ho and Kim Hye-soo, it was presented by Sports Chosun and broadcast on KBS.

== Nominations and winners ==
Complete list of nominees and winners:

(Winners denoted in bold)

Best Film	Best Director
**The Host**; Family Ties; King and the Clown; Radio Star; Tazza: The High Rollers	**Kim Tae-yong** - **Family Ties**; Bong Joon-ho - The Host; Choi Dong-hoon - Tazza: The High Rollers; Lee Joon-ik - King and the Clown; Yoo Ha - A Dirty Carnival
Best Actor	Best Actress
**Ahn Sung-ki** - **Radio Star**; **Park Joong-hoon** - **Radio Star**; Jo In-sung - A Dirty Carnival; Cho Seung-woo - Tazza: The High Rollers; Kam Woo-sung - King and the Clown; Song Kang-ho - The Host	**Kim Hye-soo** - **Tazza: The High Rollers**; Choi Kang-hee - My Scary Girl; Im Soo-jung - Lump Sugar; Jang Jin-young - Between Love and Hate; Lee Na-young - Maundy Thursday; Uhm Jung-hwa - For Horowitz
Best Supporting Actor	Best Supporting Actress
**Byun Hee-bong** - **The Host**; Kim Yoon-seok - Tazza: The High Rollers; Lee Beom-soo - The City of Violence; Oh Dal-su - Forbidden Quest; Yoo Hae-jin - King and the Clown	**Jung Yu-mi** - **Family Ties**; Bae Doona - The Host; Kang Sung-yeon - King and the Clown; Uhm Ji-won - Traces of Love; Yoon Ji-hye - No Mercy for the Rude
Best New Actor	Best New Actress
**Ryu Deok-hwan** - **Like a Virgin**; Ha Jung-woo - The Unforgiven; Jin Goo - A Dirty Carnival; Lee Joon-gi - King and the Clown; On Joo-wan - The Peter Pan Formula	**Go Ah-sung** - **The Host**; Choi Jung-yoon - Radio Star; Choo Ja-hyun - Bloody Tie; Kim Ah-joong - When Romance Meets Destiny; Park Si-yeon - The Fox Family
Best New Director	Best Screenplay
**Lee Hae-jun, Lee Hae-young** - **Like a Virgin**; Kim Dae-woo - Forbidden Quest; Kwon Hyung-jin - For Horowitz; Son Jae-gon - My Scary Girl; Yoon Jong-bin - The Unforgiven	**Lee Hae-jun, Lee Hae-young** - **Like a Virgin**; Bong Joon-ho - The Host; Kim Tae-yong, Sung Ki-young - Family Ties; Kim Dae-woo - Forbidden Quest; Son Jae-gon - My Scary Girl
Best Cinematography	Best Lighting
**Choi Young-hwan** - **Tazza: The High Rollers**; Kim Hyung-koo - The Host; Kim Ji-yong - Forbidden Quest; Oh Hyun-je - Bloody Tie	**Lee Kang-san, Jung Young-min** - **The Host**; Han Gi-eop - King and the Clown; Im Jae-young - Bloody Tie; Kim Sung-kwan - Tazza: The High Rollers; Shin Sang-yeol - Forbidden Quest
Best Art Direction	Best Music
**Cho Geun-hyun, Hong Joo-hee** - **Forbidden Quest**; Ha Sang-ho - Traces of Love; Jung Eun-jung - The Fox Family; Kang Seung-yong - King and the Clown; Lee Hyeong-ju - Dasepo Naughty Girls	**Lee Byung-woo** - **King and the Clown**; Bang Jun-seok - Radio Star; Kim Sang-man - Bloody Tie; Lee Byung-woo - For Horowitz; Lee Jae-jin - Maundy Thursday
Technical Award	Popular Star Award
**The Orphanage, EON** - **The Host (CG)**; Jung Kyung-hee - Forbidden Quest (Costume Design); Kim Sang-bum, Kim Jae-bum - King and the Clown (Editing); Ryu Hyeon - For Horowitz (Sound); Shin Min-kyung - Tazza: The High Rollers (Editing)	**Kang Sung-yeon** - **King and the Clown**; **Kim Hye-soo** - **Tazza: The High Rollers**; **Lee Joon-gi** - **King and the Clown**; **Shin Hyun-joon** - **Barefoot Ki-bong**
Best Couple Award	Audience Choice Award for Most Popular Film
**Ahn Sung-ki** and **Park Joong-hoon** - **Radio Star**	**The Host**
