= The Host (2006 soundtrack) =

Soundtrack album by Lee Byung-woo
- Released: 2006
- Genre: Film score
- Length: 61:38 (South Korea); 60:11 (International)
- Label: Musikdorf; Milan Records

Lee Byung-woo chronology
For Horowitz (2006)	The Host (2006)	Voice of a Murderer (2007)

The Host (also titled Monster (Korean: 괴물; RR: Goemul)) is the soundtrack album to the 2006 film of the same name directed by Bong Joon Ho. The film's original score is composed by Lee Byung-woo and released through Musikdorf in South Korea and Milan Records internationally.

== Release ==
The album was released in South Korea under the Musikdorf label in 2006. This version of the album featured 40 tracks, while the international version distributed by Milan Records consisted only 23 tracks.

== Track listing ==
=== South Korea release ===
The titles of the songs are mentioned in Korean languages, with the romanization of the English title as noted. The official English title is listed separately.

No.	Title	Official English title	Length
1.	"Prologue – 드넓은 한강 괴물은 자란다" (deuneolb-eun hangang goemul-eun jalanda) (The vast Han River monster grows)	"Prologue: Mighty Han River – The Monster Is Growing"	2:09
2.	"백주의 대습격" (baegjuui daeseubgyeog) (A great attack in broad daylight)	"Sudden Attack in Broad Daylight"	2:09
3.	"잡해재 않는 손" (jabhaejae anhneun son) (Hands that don't do any harm)	"Hand Out Of Reach"	1:13
4.	"떠나는 가족" (tteonaneun gajog) (Family leaving)	"The Family Leaves"	0:48
5.	"노란 바이러스" (nolan baileoseu) (yellow virus)	"Yellow Virus"	1:48
6.	"골뱅이 @" (golbaeng-i @)	"Whelk @"	0:42
7.	"괴불 하우스" (goebul hauseu) (The House of the Goblin)	"The Monster's Lair"	0:52
8.	"어둠속의 현서" (eodumsog-ui hyeonseo) (Hyunseo in the dark)	'Hyun Suh In A Dark Place"	1:28
9.	"한강찬가 (B4-A3)" ((hangangchanga) (B4-A3)) ((Han River Hymn) (B4-A3))	"In Praise Of The Han River" (B4-A3)	1:48
10.	"빗속의 검문" (bis-sog-ui geommun) (Checkpoint in the rain)	"Checkpoint In The Rain"	1:17
11.	"현서야!" (hyeonseoya!) (Hey Hyunseo!)	"Hyun Suh!"	2:23
12.	"헛총질" (heoschongjil) (Shooting a gun)	"A False Shooting"	0:32
13.	"배고픈 형제" (baegopeun hyeongje) (hungry brother)	"Starving Brothers"	1:12
14.	"배고픈 괴물" (baegopeun goemul) (hungry monster)	"Starving Monster"	0:37
15.	"시궁창의 오누이" (sigungchang-ui onu-i) (The siblings of the gutter)	"Brother And Sister In The Sewer"	1:53
16.	"새벽, 푹우 그리고 대혈투" (saebyeog, pug-u geuligo daehyeoltu) (Dawn, heavy rain and a bloody fight)	"Dawn, Hard Rain And Bloody Fight"	2:03
17.	"젖은 신문지" (jeoj-eun sinmunji) (wet newspaper)	"Wet Newspaper"	2:10
18.	"수배전단" (subaejeondan) (Wanted poster)	"Most Wanted"	1:32
19.	"비과세 기타소득" (bigwase gitasodeug) (Other non-taxable income)	"Non-Taxable Income"	1:08
20.	"도발이의 천재" (dobal-iui cheonjae) (The genius of provocation)	"Smart Fugitive"	1:14
21.	"희미한 메세지" (huimihan meseji) (Faint message)	"Faint Message"	0:45
22.	"거븍이" (geobug-i) (turtle)	"Thurtle"	0:55
23.	"외로운 질주 Ver.1" (oeloun jilju Ver.1) (Lonely run Ver.1)	"Running Lonely" (Version 1)	0:32
24.	"새 식구 Ver.1" (sae siggu Ver.1) (New family member ver.1)	"A New Family" (Version 1)	1:39
25.	"No Virus"		1:38
26.	"원효대교 너머로" (wonhyodaegyo neomeolo) (Beyond Wonhyo Bridge)	"Over Wonhyo Bridge"	1:25
27.	"소녀, 달리다" (sonyeo, dallida) (girl, run)	"Girl, Run!"	0:22
28.	"비명" (bimyeong) (scream)	"Scream"	0:36
29.	"닿지 않는 손" (dahji anhneun son) (Hands that don't reach)	"Unreachable Hand"	1:11
30.	"Agent Yellow"		2:19
31.	"놓을 수 없는 손" (noh-eul su eobsneun son) (Hands that can't be put down)	"Can't Let Go Of The Hand"	0:52
32.	"재회" (jaehoe) (Reunion)	"Reunion"	2:18
33.	"외로운 학엄병" (oeloun hag-eombyeong) (Lonely student soldier)	"A Single Molotov Cocktail"	1:40
34.	"신궁" (singung) (Shrine)	"The Expert Archer"	0:47
35.	"새 식구 Ver.2" (sae siggu Ver.2) (New family member ver.2)	"A New Family" (Version 2)	2:02
36.	"한강찬가 (Trumpet Ver.)" ((hangangchanga (Trumpet Ver.)) ((Han River Hymn) (Trumpet Ver.))	"In Praise Of The Han River" (Trumpet Version)	1:13
37.	"버려진 노래" (beolyeojin nolae) (abandoned song)	"Abandoned Song"	2:36
38.	"눈오는 매점" (nun-oneun maejeom) (Snowy store)	"Little Hut Snow"	2:49
39.	"한강찬가 (Vocal Ver.)" ((hangangchanga (Vocal Ver.)) ((Han River Hymn) (Vocal Ver.))	"In Praise Of The Han River" (Vocal Version)	3:02
40.	"외로운 질주 Ver.2" (oeloun jilju Ver.2) (Lonely run Ver.2)	"Running Lonely" (Version 2)	3:59
Total length:			61:38

=== International release ===
No.	Title	Length
1.	"Prologue: Mighty Han River"	2:09
2.	"Sudden Attack in Broad Daylight"	3:20
3.	"The Monster's Lair"	2:55
4.	"Yellow Virus"	4:17
5.	"Checkpoints in the Rain"	1:38
6.	"Hyun Suh!"	2:24
7.	"Starving Brothers"	1:39
8.	"Brother and Sister in the Sewer"	1:52
9.	"Most Wanted"	2:50
10.	"Dawn, Hard Rain and a Bloody Fight"	2:03
11.	"Wet Newspaper"	2:11
12.	"Smart Fugitive"	2:24
13.	"Over Wonhyo Bridge"	4:39
14.	"Running Lonely" (Version 1)	2:48
15.	"Unreachable Hand, Can't Let Go of the Hand"	4:16
16.	"Reunion"	2:19
17.	"A Single Molotov Cocktail"	2:27
18.	"A New Family"	2:03
19.	"In Praise of the Han River" (Trumpet Version)	1:36
20.	"Abandoned Song"	2:36
21.	"In Praise of the Han River" (Vocal)	3:03
22.	"Little Hut in Snow"	2:50
23.	"Running Lonely" (Version 2)	1:52
Total length:		60:11

== Reception ==
Derek Elley of Variety stated "Lee Byeong-woo's pounding drum music, is impressive". Manohla Dargis of The New York Times and Dana Stevens of Slate called the score "fascinating" and "exceptional", while Jim Emerson of RogerEbert.com called it "magnificent". Tim Clark of Soundtrack.Net had stated that Byung-woo's work in The Host "exemplifies his ability to shape thematic material to suit a wide variety of moods without ever overpowering the images."

== Accolades ==
Award	Category	Nominee(s)	Result	Ref.
51st Asia Pacific Film Festival	Best Sound	Choi Tae-young	Won	
44th Grand Bell Awards	Best Sound Effects	Lee Seung-chul, Choi Tae-young	Nominated	
5th Korean Film Awards	Best Sound	Choi Tae-young	Won	
5th Korean Film Awards	Best Score	Lee Byung-woo	Nominated	
