= 44th Grand Bell Awards =

2007 edition of award ceremony

- Date: June 8, 2007
- Site: Sejong Center for the Performing Arts, Seoul
- Hosted by: Kim Ah-joong, Yoo Jung-hyun

Television coverage
- Network: SBS
- Duration: 2 hours

The 44th Grand Bell Awards ceremony was held at the Sejong Center for the Performing Arts in Seoul on June 8, 2007, and hosted by Kim Ah-joong and announcer Yoo Jung-hyun.

== Nominations and winners ==
(Winners denoted in bold)

Best Film	Best Director
**Family Ties**; 200 Pounds Beauty; A Dirty Carnival; The Host; Radio Star	**Bong Joon-ho** – **The Host**; Choi Dong-hoon – Tazza: The High Rollers; Kim Tae-yong – Family Ties; Kim Yong-hwa – 200 Pounds Beauty; Ryoo Seung-wan – The City of Violence
Best Actor	Best Actress
**Ahn Sung-ki** – **Radio Star**; Jo In-sung – A Dirty Carnival; Lee Dae-geun – Mr. Lee vs Mr. Lee; Sul Kyung-gu – Voice of a Murderer; Song Kang-ho – The Host	**Kim Ah-joong** – **200 Pounds Beauty**; Kim Hye-soo – Tazza: The High Rollers; Moon Geun-young – Love Me Not; Uhm Jung-hwa – For Horowitz; Ye Ji-won – Old Miss Diary the Movie
Best Supporting Actor	Best Supporting Actress
**Kim Yoon-seok** – **Tazza: The High Rollers**; Byun Hee-bong – The Host; Chun Ho-jin – A Dirty Carnival; Lee Beom-soo – The City of Violence; Yu Oh-seong – Lump Sugar	**Shim Hye-jin** – **Over the Border**; Go Ah-sung – The Host; Kim Hye-ok – Family Ties; Kim Young-ok – Old Miss Diary the Movie; Park Ji-young – The Show Must Go On
Best New Actor	Best New Actress
**Ryu Deok-hwan** – **Like a Virgin**; Daniel Henney – Seducing Mr. Perfect; Jung Ji-hoon – I'm a Cyborg, But That's OK; MC Mong – Three Fellas; Park Kwang-jung – Driving with My Wife's Lover	**Jo Yi-jin** – **Over the Border**; Go Hyun-jung – Woman on the Beach; Hyun Young – The Perfect Couple; Kim Tae-hee – The Restless; Shin Ae-ra – Ice Bar
Best New Director	Best Screenplay
**Kwon Hyung-jin** – **For Horowitz**; Kim Han-min – Paradise Murdered; Kim Sang-woo – Seducing Mr. Perfect; Kim Sok-yun – Old Miss Diary the Movie; Kim Tai-sik – Driving with My Wife's Lover	**Kim Tae-yong, Sung Ki-young** – **Family Ties**; Jang Gyu-seong – Small Town Rivals; Kim Min-sook – For Horowitz; Lee Hae-jun, Lee Hae-young – Like a Virgin; Yoo Ha – A Dirty Carnival
Best Cinematography	Best Editing
**Park Hyun-cheol** – **200 Pounds Beauty**; Choi Young-hwan – Tazza: The High Rollers; Kim Hyung-koo – The Host; Kim Yeong-cheol – The City of Violence; Kim Young-ho – The Restless	**Kim Sun-min** – **The Host**; Steve M. Choe, Kim Chang-ju – For Horowitz; Nam Na-yeong – The City of Violence; Park Gok-ji – 200 Pounds Beauty; Shin Min-kyung – Tazza: The High Rollers
Best Art Direction	Best Lighting
**Kim Ki-chul** – **The Restless**; Jang Geun-young – 200 Pounds Beauty; Jang Jae-jin – Love Me Not; Song Hye-jin – Seducing Mr. Perfect; Yang Hong-sam – Over the Border	**Lee Joo-saeng** – **Paradise Murdered**; Choi Seok-jae – Traces of Love; Kim Sung-kwan – Tazza: The High Rollers; Lee Kang-san, Jung Young-min – The Host; Lee Seok-hwan – 200 Pounds Beauty
Best Costume Design	Best Music
**Jo Sang-gyeong** – **Tazza: The High Rollers**; Chae Kyung-hwa – Love Me Not; Choi Seon-im – Over the Border; Emi Wada – The Restless; Jo Sang-gyeong – 200 Pounds Beauty	**Lee Jae-hak** – **200 Pounds Beauty**; Bang Jun-seok – Radio Star; Lee Byung-woo – For Horowitz; Lee Dong-jun – Lump Sugar; Yang Bang-ean – Beyond the Years
Best Visual Effects	Best Sound Effects
**DTI, ETRI, Shin Jae-ho, Jeong Do-an** – **The Restless**; Jeong Seong-jin – 200 Pounds Beauty; Lee Jeon-hyeong – I'm a Cyborg, But That's OK; The Orphanage, EON – The Host; Takahiko Akiyama – The Fox Family	**Jung Kwang-ho, Choi Tae-young** – **Lump Sugar**; Jeon Sang-jun, Lee Seung-chul – 200 Pounds Beauty; Kim Kyung-tae, Choi Tae-young – The Restless; Lee Seung-chul, Choi Tae-young – The Host; Ryu Hyeon, Choi Tae-young – For Horowitz
Best Planning	Special Award
**Lee Jeong-hak** – **Lump Sugar**; Choi Yong-bae – The Host; Jung Tae-sung – 200 Pounds Beauty; Kim Moo-ryoung – Like a Virgin; Min Jin-gi – For Horowitz	**Jeon Do-yeon** (for winning Best Actress in Cannes)
Popularity Award	Korean Wave Popularity Award
**Kim Ah-joong** – **200 Pounds Beauty**; **Lee Beom-soo** – **The City of Violence**	**Jung Ji-hoon** – **I'm a Cyborg, But That's OK**; **Kim Tae-hee** – **The Restless**
Lifetime Achievement Award
**Shin Young-kyun** (Actor)
