= Family Ties (2006 film) =

- Theatrical release poster
- Hangul: 가족의 탄생
- Hanja: 家族의 誕生
- RR: Gajogui tansaeng
- MR: Kajogŭi t'ansaeng
- Directed by: Kim Tae-yong
- Written by: Kim Tae-yong; Sung Ki-young
- Produced by: Bae Yong-kook; Jung Tae-woon
- Starring: Moon So-ri; Go Doo-shim; Uhm Tae-woong; Gong Hyo-jin; Kim Hye-ok; Bong Tae-gyu; Jung Yu-mi
- Cinematography: Jo Yong-gyu
- Edited by: Sung Su-ah
- Music by: Cho Sung-woo
- Distributed by: Lotte Entertainment
- Release date: May 18, 2006
- Running time: 113 minutes
- Country: South Korea
- Language: Korean
- Budget: US$2,500,000
- Box office: US$1,040,300

Family Ties (Korean: 가족의 탄생; lit. 'Birth of a Family') is the second film by South Korean director Kim Tae-yong. Mismarketed as a slapstick comedy through its promotional posters, the film is actually a generation-to-generation view of two families through love and life.

== Synopsis ==
The film is divided into three different 'family' portraits. The first two take place at roughly the same time.

In part one, restaurateur Mi-ra (Moon So-ri) is satisfied with her ordered, if solitary, life until her ex-con brother Hyung-chul (Uhm Tae-woong) suddenly appears with his much older new wife Mu-shin (Go Doo-shim) in tow. Mi-ra reluctantly allows them to stay a time with her at the family home, but friction builds over a short time and with the unexpected arrival of Mu-shin's young stepdaughter Chae-hyun, the three adults quickly reach a breaking point.

Part two concerns a quick-tempered young woman Sun-kyung (Gong Hyo-jin) and her relationship with her estranged mother (Kim Hye-ok). Sun-kyung's resentment toward her mother is exacerbated by an affair the latter is having with a married man (Ju Jin-mo). Sun-kyung diligently tries to find employment in Japan, but once her mother dies of cancer, she must care for her young half-brother Kyung-suk and abandon her expatriation.

Part three brings together the first two story lines with the relationship of Chae-hyun (Jung Yu-mi) and Kyung-suk (Bong Tae-gyu) some years later. Kyung-suk, now a college student, is extremely jealous of Chae-hyun's openness to other men in her life and their compatibility is tested as a result of what he considers her "easy" behavior [her promiscuity is neither confirmed nor denied]. The film ends with Kyung-suk being accepted by Chae-hyun's adopted family from part one.

== Cast ==
=== Part 1 ===
- Moon So-ri as Lee Mi-ra
- Uhm Tae-woong as Lee Hyung-chul
- Go Doo-shim as Oh Mu-shin
- Lee Ra-hye as young Chae-hyun
- Jung Heung-chae as President Kim
- Kim Kkot-bi as regular student customer at food stall 1
- Lee Na-ri as regular student customer at food stall 2
- Hwang Eun-ji as regular student customer at food stall 3
- Lee Jin-seon as regular student customer at food stall 4
- Kim Dong-young as regular student customer at food stall 5
- Jo Joon-hwan as regular student customer at food stall 6
- Jo Sung-hwan as regular student customer at food stall 7
- Lee In-chul as 동동구리무
- Kang-to as Mi-ra's dog

=== Part 2 ===
- Gong Hyo-jin as Yoo Sun-kyung
- Kim Hye-ok as Mae-ja
- Kim Hee-soo as young Kyung-suk
- Joo Jin-mo as Woon-shik
- Ryoo Seung-bum as Joon-ho, Sun-kyung's ex-boyfriend (cameo)
- Park Joong-hyun as interviewer 1
- Kim Hyun-ah as interviewer 2
- Song Jeong-woo as interviewer 3
- Oh Hye-won as homeroom teacher
- Kyungil High School Marching Band as marching band
- Song Hyun-hee as Japanese tourist
- Han Yoo-na as Joon-ho's girlfriend
- Lee Hyun-soon as Woon-shik's wife
- Chu Seung-yeob as Woon-shik's son 1
- Kim Tae-hoon as Woon-shik's son 2

=== Part 3 ===
- Bong Tae-gyu as Choi Kyung-suk
- Jung Yu-mi as Chae-hyun
- Im Jung-eun as Hyun-ah
- Ko Kyu-pil as Chae-hyun/Kyung-suk's friend 1
- Jeon Mi-young as Chae-hyun/Kyung-suk's friend 2
- Jo Myung-yeon as Tae-shik
- Hong Jae-sung as Sang-ho
- Kim Tae-yoon as Young-ho
- Shin Ye-won as child seated at rear end of train
- Ryu Seung-hyun as debt creditor man
- Woo Hyun as Go Mul-sang
- Jo Hee-bong as man fighting on train
- Lee Eun-jung as woman fighting on train
- Park Mi-hyun as pregnant woman
- Monk Jungwae as monk

== Awards and nominations ==
Year	Award	Category	Recipient	Result	Ref.
2006	14th Chunsa Film Art Awards	Best New Actor	Uhm Tae-woong	Won	
2006	7th Busan Film Critics Awards	Best Screenplay	Kim Tae-yong, Sung Ki-young	Won	
2006	7th Busan Film Critics Awards	Best Director	Kim Tae-yong	Won	
2006	26th Korean Association of Film Critics Awards	Best Film	Family Ties	Won	
2006	47th Thessaloniki International Film Festival	Jameson Audience Award	Kim Tae-yong	Won	
2006	47th Thessaloniki International Film Festival	Best Actress	Moon So-ri, Go Doo-shim, Gong Hyo-jin, Kim Hye-ok	Won	
2006	47th Thessaloniki International Film Festival	Best Screenplay	Kim Tae-yong, Sung Ki-young	Won	
2006	47th Thessaloniki International Film Festival	Golden Alexander (Best Feature Film)	Family Ties	Won	
2006	27th Blue Dragon Film Awards	Best Supporting Actress	Jung Yu-mi	Won	
2006	27th Blue Dragon Film Awards	Best Screenplay	Kim Tae-yong, Sung Ki-young	Nominated	
2006	27th Blue Dragon Film Awards	Best Director	Kim Tae-yong	Won	
2006	27th Blue Dragon Film Awards	Best Film	Family Ties	Nominated	
2006	5th Korean Film Awards	Best New Actress	Jung Yu-mi	Nominated	
2006	5th Korean Film Awards	Best Actress	Gong Hyo-jin	Nominated	
2006	5th Korean Film Awards	Best Editing	Sung Su-ah	Nominated	
2006	5th Korean Film Awards	Best Screenplay	Kim Tae-yong, Sung Ki-young	Nominated	
2006	5th Korean Film Awards	Best Director	Kim Tae-yong	Nominated	
2006	5th Korean Film Awards	Best Film	Family Ties	Nominated	
2007	43rd Baeksang Arts Awards	Best Screenplay	Kim Tae-yong, Sung Ki-young	Nominated	
2007	43rd Baeksang Arts Awards	Best Director	Kim Tae-yong	Nominated	
2007	44th Grand Bell Awards	Best Supporting Actress	Kim Hye-ok	Nominated	
2007	44th Grand Bell Awards	Best Screenplay	Kim Tae-yong, Sung Ki-young	Won	
2007	44th Grand Bell Awards	Best Director	Kim Tae-yong	Nominated	
2007	44th Grand Bell Awards	Best Film	Family Ties	Won	
2007	9th Deauville Asian Film Festival	Lotus Jury Prize	Family Ties	Won	

Preceded by King and the Clown	Grand Bell Awards for Best Film; 2007	Succeeded by The Chaser
