= The City of Violence =

- Film poster
- Hangul: 짝패
- RR: Jjakpae
- MR: Tchakp'ae
- Directed by: Ryoo Seung-wan
- Written by: Kim Jung-min; Lee Won-jae; Ryoo Seung-wan
- Produced by: Kim Jung-min; Ryoo Seung-wan
- Starring: Ryoo Seung-wan; Jung Doo-hong; Lee Beom-soo
- Cinematography: Kim Yeong-cheol
- Edited by: Nam Na-yeong
- Music by: Bang Jun-seok
- Production company: Filmmaker R&K
- Distributed by: CJ Entertainment
- Release date: May 25, 2006
- Running time: 92 minutes
- Country: South Korea
- Language: Korean
- Budget: US$2.7 million
- Box office: US$6.2 million

The City of Violence (Korean: 짝패; RR: Jjakpae; lit. 'Partner; Pal') is a 2006 South Korean action film directed by Ryoo Seung-wan, who stars in the film, alongside Jung Doo-hong and Lee Beom-soo.

== Plot ==
Wang-jae, an ex-gangster, chases a gang of punks into an alley and gets fatally stabbed to death. His four childhood friends reunite in nearly 20 years at Wang-jae's funeral. Up to then, each person has gone their own way: Tae-su became a Seoul police detective. Pil-ho has taken over his brother-in-law Wang-jae's business. Seok-hwan works as a debt collector while his older brother Dong-hwan struggles as a maths professor. After the funeral, Tae-su decides to investigate the murder within a week before he would return to his job in Seoul.

Meanwhile, Seok-hwan decides to find and kill Wang-jae's murderers. While investigating, Tae-su is attacked by youth gangs, where he barely escapes with his life after Seok-hwan's unexpected arrival. They decide to work together. After hunting the gangs, they discover Wang-jae's death was not a random mindless attack, but a planned murder. The revelation leads them to Dong-hwan, who confesses that Pil-ho was behind the plan after Wang-jae disapproved Pil-ho's plans to turn their city into a tourist district. After strangers tried to kill him as part of tying up Pil-ho's loose ends, Wang-jae's young murderer agrees to testify against Pil-ho.

A killer douses the young murderer in gasoline and sets him on fire. Later, Pil-ho badly thrashes Tae-su and also targets to finish Seok-hwan, Dong-hwan and their mother in an accident, but Seok-wan survives. After Dong-hwan and his mother's funeral, Seok-hwan and Wang-jae's widow leave the funeral house and sees Tae-su waiting outside. Tae-su persuades Wang-jae's widow into revealing information on her brother Pil-ho's whereabouts. Tae-su and Seok-hwan storm Pil-ho's fortress, where they fight their way through swarms of armed cooks until the banquet room.

Meanwhile, Pil-ho kills the Seoul president, which prompts all guests to leave. Tae-su and Seok-hwan confronts Pil-ho, who is along with his four elite guards in the room. A fight ensues where Tae-su and Seok-hwan manages to defeat Pil-ho's elite guards and sets to take on Pil-ho, who takes them by surprise by attacking Seok-hwan. Pil-ho turns and stabs Tae-su, but Seok-hwan later finishes Pil-ho with a katana. As Tae-su bleeds to death, an exhausted Seok-hwan notices the carnage that he and Tae-su had created and sighs heavily.

== Cast ==
- Ryoo Seung-wan – Yoo Suk-hwan
  - Kim Si-hoo – Yoo Suk-hwan (young)
- Jung Doo-hong – Jung Tae-soo
  - On Joo-wan – Jung Tae-soo (young)
- Lee Beom-soo – Jang Pil-ho
  - Kim Dong-young – Jang Pil-ho (young)
- Jung Suk-yong – Yoo Dong-hwan
  - Park Young-seo – Yoo Dong-hwan (young)
- Lee Joo-sil – Yoo Suk-hwan's mother
- Ahn Gil-kang – Oh Wang-jae
  - Jung Woo – Oh Wang-jae (young)
- Kim Byeong-ok – Youth president
- Kim Seo-hyung – Jang Mi-ran
- Jo Deok-hyun – Boss Jo
- Kim Gi-cheon – Sal-soo
- Kim Kkot-bi – high school girl with razor blade
- Kim Su-hyeon – Seoul detective
- Im Jun-il – Team leader Im
- Lee Na-ri – Miss Bae
- Park Ji-hwan – teen gang boss
- Lee Hong-pyo – Onsung area cop
- Oh Joo-hee – hanbok-wearing woman in special room 2
- Kim Hyo-sun – secretary

== Awards and nominations ==
2006 Chunsa Film Art Awards

- Best Supporting Actor - Lee Beom-soo

2006 Busan Film Critics Awards

- Best Cinematography - Kim Yeong-cheol

2006 Blue Dragon Film Awards

- Nomination - Best Supporting Actor - Lee Beom-soo

2006 Korean Film Awards

- Best Supporting Actor - Lee Beom-soo
- Nomination - Best Editing - Nam Na-yeong
- Nomination - Best Music - Bang Jun-seok
- Nomination - Best Sound - Seo Yeong-jun, Jo Min-ho

2007 Grand Bell Awards

- Nomination - Best Director - Ryoo Seung-wan
- Nomination - Best Supporting Actor - Lee Beom-soo
- Nomination - Best Cinematography - Kim Yeong-cheol
- Nomination - Best Editing - Nam Na-yeong
