= Traces of Love =

2006 Korean film

- Theatrical release poster
- Hangul: 가을로
- RR: Gaeullo
- MR: Kaŭllo
- Directed by: Kim Dae-seung
- Written by: Jang Min-seok
- Produced by: Ahn Dong-kyu
- Starring: Yoo Ji-tae; Kim Ji-soo; Uhm Ji-won
- Cinematography: Lee Mo-gae
- Edited by: Kim Sang-bum; Kim Jae-bum
- Music by: Jo Yeong-wook
- Distributed by: Lotte Entertainment
- Release date: 26 October 2006 (South Korea)
- Running time: 108 minutes
- Country: South Korea
- Language: Korean
- Box office: US$3,153,324

Traces of Love (Korean: 가을로) is a 2006 South Korean romantic drama film directed by Kim Dae-seung, and starring Yoo Ji-tae, Kim Ji-soo, and Uhm Ji-won. The film is based on the 1995 Sampoong Department Store collapse.

== Plot ==
Law student Choi Hyun-woo and television director Seo Min-joo are a young couple in love, and engaged to be married. Tragedy strikes, however, and Min-joo is killed in the Sampoong Department Store collapse. Several years later, Hyun-woo is given a journal that was written by his former fiancée, which details the journey they would have taken on their honeymoon. Hyun-woo sets out to visit the various places described in the journal, but on his travels he meets another woman, Yoon Se-jin, who turns out to be a survivor of the collapse. Se-jin was a coffee stand server, and was serving Min-joo when the building collapsed.

== Cast ==
- Yoo Ji-tae as Choi Hyun-woo
- Kim Ji-soo as Seo Min-joo
- Uhm Ji-won as Yoon Se-jin
- Choi Jong-won as Min-joo's father
- Park Seung-tae as Min-joo's mother
- Park Chul-min as Detective Park
- Jung In-gi as prosecutor
- Kim Ki-cheon as real estate man
- Im Jong-yoon as chief prosecutor

== Awards and nominations ==
2006 Blue Dragon Film Awards

- Nomination – Best Supporting Actress – Uhm Ji-won
- Nomination – Best Art Direction – Ha Sang-ho

2007 Chunsa Film Art Awards

- Best Supporting Actress – Uhm Ji-won
- Best Screenplay – Jang Min-seok

2007 Grand Bell Awards

- Nomination – Best Lighting – Choi Seok-jae

== Remake ==
Beijing Hairun Pictures is set to make a Chinese remake in 2016, co-produced with Korean company Dhuta Co. Ltd. Victoria Hon, deputy president of Hairun Pictures said, "Traces of Love has an enormous potential to be loved by the Chinese audience. Chinese people love the kind of films that heal the spiritual wound and give the courage to fall in love one more time. Traces of Love does this job in a very special way, which is why we have decided to remake this work."
