= Deep Trap =

- Theatrical poster
- Directed by: Kwon Hyung-jin
- Written by: Han Soo-bong
- Produced by: Choe Seon-mi
- Starring: Ma Dong-seok; Jo Han-sun; Kim Min-kyung
- Cinematography: Ha Gyeong-ho
- Edited by: Steven M. Choe; Park Kyoung-suk
- Music by: Mok Yeong-jin
- Production companies: Daydream; JNC Media Group; Invent Stone
- Release date: September 10, 2015
- Running time: 96 minutes
- Country: South Korea
- Language: Korean

Deep Trap (Korean: 함정; RR: Hamjeong) (previously known as Exchange) is a 2015 South Korean psychological thriller film starring Ma Dong-seok, Jo Han-sun and Kim Min-kyung, and directed by Kwon Hyung-jin. Based on an actual SNS crime, it depicts the terror experienced by a married couple while on a trip to an isolated island. It won Best Film Award in the Orient Express section at the Fantasporto in 2016.

== Cast ==
- Ma Dong-seok as Park Sung-chul
- Jo Han-sun as Kwon Jun-sik
- Kim Min-kyung as Lee So-yeon
- Ji An as Kim Min-hee
- Kang Seung-wan as Chang-gyoo
- Jeong Gi-seop as Constable Hwang
- Song Tae-yoon as Newcomer
