= Kim Tae-yong =

South Korean filmmaker (born 1969)

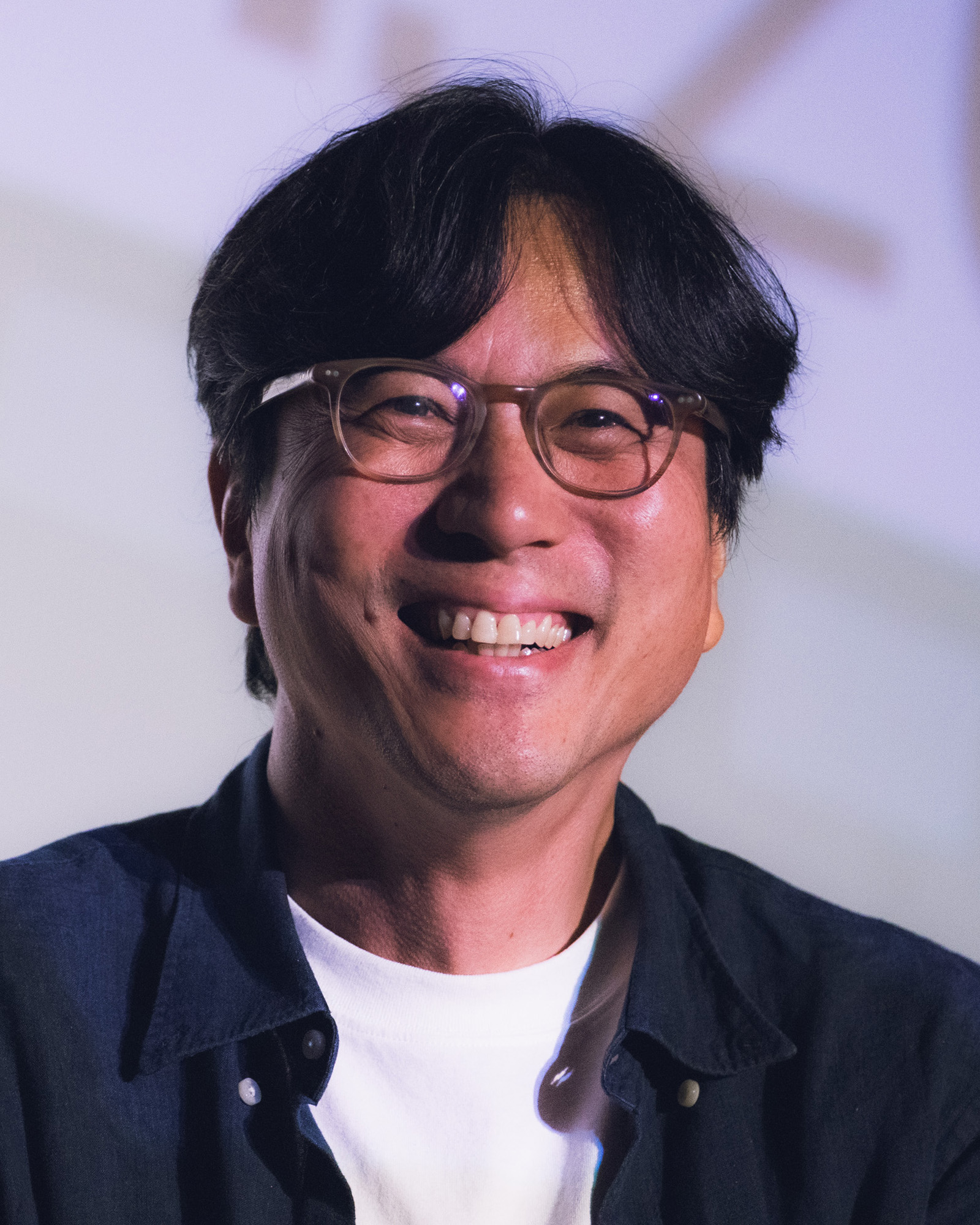
- Kim in 2025
- Born: December 9, 1969 (age 56); Seoul, South Korea
- Education: Yonsei University - Politics and Diplomacy; Korean Academy of Film Arts - Filmmaking
- Occupations: Film director, screenwriter
- Years active: 1998–present
- Spouse: Tang Wei (m. 2014)
- Children: 2

Korean name
- Hangul: 김태용
- Hanja: 金泰勇
- RR: Gim Taeyong
- MR: Kim T'aeyong

Kim Tae-yong (Korean: 김태용; born December 9, 1969) is a South Korean film director and screenwriter. After his feature directorial debut Memento Mori (1999), he helmed the critically-acclaimed Family Ties (2006), and the English-language remake Late Autumn (2010).

== Career ==
Tae-yong graduated from Yonsei University in 1994 with a major in politics and diplomacy, and first became involved in Korean cinema through a friend, who was an assistant director of an independent production. Inspired by the vibrant atmosphere that came with working on a set, Kim then enrolled at the Korean Academy of Film Arts (KAFA) in 1996. He met and became friends with fellow director Min Kyu-dong while at KAFA, where he and his classmates would work on short films as a part of the crew and doing lighting. In 1999, Kim and Min received the offer to direct Memento Mori as a sequel to the horror film Whispering Corridors (1998), and so began Kim's foray into commercial cinema.

In some ways, Memento Mori might be considered the most influential Korean horror film of the 2000s. Although it was not a box-office hit, the film is frequently cited by young filmmakers and cinema fans as a modern-day classic. At the time of its release and in the intervening years, most critics tended to focus their attention on the other of Memento Mori's co-directors, Min Kyu-dong, however the release of Family Ties in spring 2006 established Kim as a highly regarded filmmaker in his own right. His intimate portrayal of a totally unconventional but non-dysfunctional family garnered multiple domestic and international awards.

Kim's third feature film Late Autumn was a remake of Lee Man-hee's 1966 classic Manchu set in Seattle. It was also critically acclaimed and became the highest-grossing Korean film in China.

Kim then joined the restoration project and re-directed Crossroads of Youth (1934) by "performing" Korea's oldest known silent film with live narration (by the byeonsa) and musical accompaniment.

Apart from his feature films, Kim has been active in a variety of creative endeavors, from hosting a cinema-themed TV show on EBS to directing plays, shooting documentaries and making cameo appearances (both times as a film director) in the films All for Love (2005) by Min Kyu-dong and Family Matters (2006) by Nam Seon-ho.

== Personal life ==
Kim married Chinese actress Tang Wei on July 12, 2014, in the front yard of the home of film legend Ingmar Bergman on the remote Swedish island of Fårö. A formal wedding ceremony was later held in Hong Kong, with only immediate family members as guests. The couple first met in 2009 when he directed her in the film Late Autumn, and began dating in October 2013 after Tang shot a commercial in Korea.

== Filmography ==
=== Feature film ===
Feature film credits
Year	Title		Credited as			Notes
Year	English	Korean	Director	Screenplay	Producer	Notes
1992	Space police human power	우주경찰 휴먼 파워	Yes	Yes	No	
1995	There is no emergency exit	비상구가 없다	Yes	Yes	No	
1999	Memento Mori	여고괴담 두번째 이야기	Yes (Note: with Min Kyu-dong)	Yes	No	
2006	Family Ties	가족의 탄생	Yes	Yes	No	
2011	Late Autumn	만추	Yes	Yes	No	
2011	Choked	가시	No	No	No	Crew member
2024	Wonderland	원더랜드	Yes	Yes	No	
2027	Kokdu	꼭두	Yes	Yes	No	Animated film

=== Short film ===
Film credits
Year	Title		Credited as			Notes
Year	English	Korean	Director	Screenplay	Producer	Notes
1997	Free to Fly	열일곱	Yes	Yes	No	Also editor
1998	Wannabe		No	No	No	Crew Member
1998	Pale Blue Dot	창백한 푸른 점	Yes	Yes	No	Also editor, cinematographer, music
1998	Everything I Got: Marco Polo's View	동방견문록	No	No	No	cinematographer
2003	Engineering—Her Accident	이공—그녀의 사고	Yes	Yes	No	
2005	Digital Short Film Omnibus Project Twentidentity (I-gong); Segment: Pass Me	디지털 단편 옴니버스 프로젝트 이공 - seg. 이 공을 받아줘(Pass Me)	Yes	Yes	No	
2007	155 miles	155 마일	No	No	Yes	
2007	Girl on the Run	달리는 차은	Yes	No	No	short film from If You Were Me 4
2008	Cinema Paradise	시네마 천국	Yes	Yes	No	Also editor
2009	Gaze 1318	시선 1318	Yes	Yes	No	
2009	Take Action, Now or Never!	모두들 하고 있습니까?	Yes	Yes	No	Green Film Festival in Seoul short film
2011	After All, We're Still in Love	오랜 연인들	Yes	Yes	No	
2012	Right on me	라잇 온 미	No	Script proofreading	No	
2012	You Are More Than Beautiful	뷰티풀 2012	Yes	No	Yes	Youku short film
2013	Jury	주리	Assistant director	No	No	
2013	Have a Cup of Tea, or See a Film!	차라도 한 잔, 영화도 한 편!	No	No	Yes	Green Film Festival in Seoul short film, 2013
2014	Picnic	신촌좀비만화 - seg. 피크닉	Yes	Yes	No	short film from Mad Sad Bad
2014	The Wind Will Carry Us	바람이 우리를 데려다 주리라	Yes	Yes	No	2016 15th Mise-en-scène Short Film Festival
2015	Her legend	그녀의 전설	Yes	Yes	Yes	

=== Documentary film ===
Film credits
Year	Title		Credited as			Notes
Year	English	Korean	Director	Screenplay	Producer	Notes
2006	On the Road, Two	온 더 로드, 투	Yes	No	Yes	rockumentary on Yoon Do Hyun Band's European tour
2016	2016 Film Pansori, Chunhyang	2016 필름 판소리, 춘향뎐	Yes	Yes	No	documentary
2018	Kokdu: A Story of Guardian Angels	꼭두 이야기	Yes	Yes	No	Korean traditional music performance documentary

=== Actor ===
- Family Matters (2006) cameo
- All for Love (2005) cameo
- Camellia Project: Three Queer Stories at Bogil Island (2005) cameo
- 2006 film 《Are you all right?》 - cameo (director Jang role)
- 2007 Short Film 155 Miles cameo
- 2013 Naver TV web drama 《The Woman Who Happened》 - cameo

== Television ==
- Cinema Paradiso (EBS, 1994) host

== Theater ==
Film credits
Year	Title		Credited as			Notes
Year	English	Korean	Director	Screenplay	Producer	Notes
2004	Fascination	매혹	Yes	No	No	
2017	Kokdu	꼭두	Yes	Yes	No	

== Awards and nominations ==
Year	Award	Category	Nominated work	Result
2000	Baeksang Arts Awards	Best New Director	Memento Mori	Won
2001	Fantasporto	International Fantasy Film Award	Memento Mori	Nominated
2001	Paris Film Festival	Grand Prix	Memento Mori	Nominated
2001	Slamdance Film Festival	Grand Jury Prize	Memento Mori	Nominated
2006	Busan Film Critics Awards	Best Screenplay	Family Ties	Won
2006	Busan Film Critics Awards	Best Director	Family Ties	Won
2006	Korean Association of Film Critics Awards	Best Film	Family Ties	Won
2006	Thessaloniki International Film Festival	Jameson Audience Award	Family Ties	Won
2006	Thessaloniki International Film Festival	Best Screenplay (Note: with Sung Ki-young)	Family Ties	Won
2006	Thessaloniki International Film Festival	Golden Alexander (Best Feature Film)	Family Ties	Won
2006	Blue Dragon Film Awards	Best Screenplay	Family Ties	Nominated
2006	Blue Dragon Film Awards	Best Director	Family Ties	Won
2006	Blue Dragon Film Awards	Best Film	Family Ties	Nominated
2006	Korean Film Awards	Best Screenplay	Family Ties	Nominated
2006	Korean Film Awards	Best Director	Family Ties	Nominated
2006	Korean Film Awards	Best Film	Family Ties	Nominated
2007	Baeksang Arts Awards	Best Screenplay	Family Ties	Nominated
2007	Baeksang Arts Awards	Best Director	Family Ties	Nominated
2007	Grand Bell Awards	Best Screenplay	Family Ties	Won
2007	Grand Bell Awards	Best Director	Family Ties	Nominated
2007	Grand Bell Awards	Best Film	Family Ties	Won
2007	Deauville Asian Film Festival	Lotus Jury Prize	Family Ties	Won
2007	Movie Day	Promising Director	Family Ties	Won
2007	Ministry of Culture and Tourism	Young Artist of Today Award	Family Ties	Won
2011	Fribourg International Film Festival	Ex-Change Award by Youth Jury	Late Autumn	Won
2011	Fribourg International Film Festival	Special Mention of the Jury of the International Federation of Film Societies	Late Autumn	Won
2011	Buil Film Awards	Best Director	Late Autumn	Won
2011	Grand Bell Awards	Best Director	Late Autumn	Nominated
2011	Busan Film Critics Awards	Best Film	Late Autumn	Won
2011	Korea Green Foundation	Green Santa Award	—N/a	Won

== See also ==
- List of Korean film directors
- Cinema of Korea
