= Song Hae-sung =

South Korean film director and screenwriter

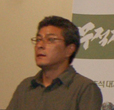
- Born: October 11, 1964 (age 61); Seoul, South Korea
- Education: Hanyang University - Theater and Film
- Occupations: Film director, screenwriter
- Years active: 1991–present

Korean name
- Hangul: 송해성
- Hanja: 宋海星
- RR: Song Haeseong
- MR: Song Haesŏng

Song Hae-sung (Korean: 송해성; born October 11, 1964) is a South Korean film director and screenwriter.

== Career ==
Song made his feature film debut in 1999 with the time-traveling romance Calla, starring Song Seung-heon and Kim Hee-sun, but didn't become more widely known until the success of his second film, Failan (2001). Starring Choi Min-sik and Cecilia Cheung, the film is about a hoodlum who finds purpose in life after discovering true love, and it won praise from audiences and critics alike for its sympathetic portrayal of the weakness and deep flaws lingering behind the façade of bravado of Korean men. It earned Song two best director honors, from the 2001 Blue Dragon Film Awards and the 2002 Grand Bell Awards, cementing him as a major force in Korean cinema.

His ambitious follow-up in 2004 was Rikidozan, a biopic on Rikidōzan, a legendary ethnic Korean pro-wrestler who became a national hero in Japan in the 1950s, starring Sul Kyung-gu in the title role. Despite its underwhelming box office, Song received his second Grand Bell Award for best director in 2005.

In 2006, he made a film adaptation of Gong Ji-young's bestselling novel Our Happy Time. Starring Lee Na-young and Kang Dong-won, Maundy Thursday focuses on the relationship between a suicidal woman and the man she visits on death row. A melodrama less about love than about compassion, the film was a hit, attracting more than 3 million viewers to become the seventh most popular domestic film of 2006.

Though he flatly refused when first approached to direct a remake of John Woo's Hong Kong noir classic A Better Tomorrow, Song eventually decided to make a South Korean version revolving around brotherhood and North Korean defectors. A Better Tomorrow (also known as Invincible, 2010) starred Song Seung-heon, Joo Jin-mo, Kim Kang-woo, and Jo Han-sun, and director Song described the film as a drama more than an action film, "propelled by the emotional interaction between the characters, and the action is there to heighten and express the dramatic tension."

He adapted another novel in 2013, Cheon Myung-gwan's Aging Family, about a grown-up trio of loser siblings who embark on a series of misadventures after moving back into their mother's home. Song said the image that crossed his mind while making the film was a bowl of bean paste stew adorned with five spoons, symbolizing a troubled but loving family. Casting Youn Yuh-jung, Yoon Je-moon, Park Hae-il, Gong Hyo-jin and Jin Ji-hee in the ensemble comedy (based on a work by Cheon Myeong-kwan Boomerang Family, Song joked that it was a "low-budget family Avengers."

== Filmography ==
- Susanne Brink's Arirang (1991) - scripter
- The Story Inside the Handbag (1991) - assistant director
- The Rules of the Game (1994) - assistant director
- Born to Kill (1996) - screenplay, assistant director
- Calla (1999) - director
- Raybang (2001) - actor
- Failan (2001) - director, screenplay
- Rikidozan (2004) - director, screenplay, script editor
- Maundy Thursday (2006) - director
- A Better Tomorrow (2010) - director
- Boomerang Family (2013) - director, screenplay

== Awards and nominations ==
Year presented, name of the award ceremony, category, nominated work, and the result of the nomination
| Year | Award | Category | Nominated work | Result | Ref. |
|---|---|---|---|---|---|
| 2001 | Blue Dragon Film Awards | Best Director | Failan | Won | |
| 2001 | Director's Cut Awards | Best Director | Failan | Won | |
| 2001 | Cine21 Film Award | Best Screenplay (Note: with Ahn Sang-hoon and Kim Hae-gon) | Failan | Won | |
| 2002 | Deauville Asian Film Festival | Lotus d'Or (Prix du Jury) ("Jury Prize") | Failan | Won | |
| 2002 | Deauville Asian Film Festival | Lotus du Meilleur Réalisateur ("Best Director") | Failan | Won | |
| 2002 | Deauville Asian Film Festival | Lotus du Public (Prix du Public) ("Audience Choice Award") | Failan | Won | |
| 2002 | 39th Grand Bell Awards | Best Director | Failan | Won | |
| 2002 | 39th Grand Bell Awards | Jury Prize | Failan | Won | |
| 2005 | 42nd Grand Bell Awards | Best Director | Rikidozan | Won | |
| 2005 | 42nd Grand Bell Awards | Best Film | Rikidozan | Nominated | |
| 2013 | 50th Grand Bell Awards | Best Director | Boomerang Family | Won | |
| 2013 | 50th Grand Bell Awards | Best Film | Boomerang Family | Nominated | |
