= Kwon Hyung-jin =

South Korean film director (born 1964)

- Born: 1964 (age 61–62); South Korea
- Education: Dongguk University
- Occupation: Film director

Korean name
- Hangul: 권형진
- RR: Gwon Hyeongjin
- MR: Kwŏn Hyŏngjin

Kwon Hyung-jin (Korean: 권형진; born 1964) is a South Korean film director. Kwon debuted with For Horowitz (2006), which won Best New Director at the 44th Grand Bell Awards, including nominations for Best Music, Best Screenplay, Best Editing, Best Sound and Best Actress, and was also nominated for Asia New Talent Award at the 10th Shanghai International Film Festival in 2007.

His second feature is the thriller Truck (2008).

His second thriller Deep Trap (2015) won Best Film Award in the Orient Express section at the Fantasporto in 2016.

== Filmography ==
- MOB 2025 (short film, 2001) - director
- For Horowitz (2006) - director, script editor
- Truck (2008) - director
- Wedding Dress (2010) - director
- Deep Trap (2015) - director, script editor

== Awards ==
- 2007 44th Grand Bell Awards: Best New Director (For Horowitz)
