= Failan =

2001 film by Song Hae-seong

- Theatrical release poster
- Hangul: 파이란
- RR: Pairan
- MR: P'airan
- Directed by: Song Hae-sung
- Written by: Ahn Sang-hoon; Song Hae-sung; Kim Hae-gon
- Based on: Love Letter by Jirō Asada
- Produced by: Hwang Woo-hyun; Hwang Jae-woo; Ahn Sang-hoon
- Starring: Choi Min-sik; Cecilia Cheung
- Cinematography: Kim Young-chul
- Edited by: Park Gok-ji
- Music by: Lee Jae-jin
- Production company: Tube Pictures
- Distributed by: Tube Entertainment
- Release date: April 28, 2001
- Running time: 115 minutes
- Country: South Korea
- Language: Korean
- Budget: $2 million

Failan (Korean: 파이란) is a 2001 South Korean romantic drama film written and directed by Song Hae-sung. The film was adapted from the Japanese novel Love Letter by Jirō Asada. It stars Choi Min-sik and Cecilia Cheung.

== Plot ==
After losing both her parents, Failan immigrates to South Korea to seek her only remaining relatives. Once she arrives, she finds out that her relatives have moved to Canada well over a year ago. Desperate to stay and make a living, Failan is forced to have an arranged marriage through a matchmaking agency.

Lee Kang-jae is an old and outdated gangster who has no respect from his peers. Short on money, Kang-jae decides to take on the arranged marriage. Having nothing more than a picture of Kang-jae, Failan spends her days dreaming and wishing that Kang-jae would come to visit her. Failan often writes to Kang-jae in sorrow about how much she misses and thinks about him, but never has the nerve to give the letters to Kang-jae. Things take a turn when Kang-jae is asked by his boss to take the fall for a murder in exchange for some money. The only hope in his worthless life is the wife he never met.

== Cast ==
- Choi Min-sik as Lee Kang-jae
- Cecilia Cheung as Failan
- Son Byong-ho as Park Yong-sik
- Gong Hyung-jin as Kyung-su
- Kim Ji-young as Laundry woman
- Min Kyung-jin as Employment agency director
- Ji Dae-han
- Kim Hae-gon
- Kim Kyung-ae
- Kim Kwang-sik
- Gong Yoo-seok
- Jung Dae-hoon
- Kim Su-hyeon as Student

== Awards ==
2001 Blue Dragon Film Awards

- Best Director: Song Hae-sung
- Best Actor: Choi Min-sik

2001 Busan Film Critics Awards

- Best Actor: Choi Min-sik

2001 Director's Cut Awards

- Best Director: Song Hae-sung
- Best Actor: Choi Min-sik

2002 Deauville Asian Film Festival

- Lotus d'Or (Prix du Jury) ("Jury Prize"): Failan
- Lotus du Meilleur Réalisateur ("Best Director"): Song Hae-sung
- Lotus du Meilleur Acteur ("Best Actor"): Choi Min-sik
- Lotus du Public (Prix du Public) ("Audience Choice Award"): Failan

2002 Grand Bell Awards

- Best Director: Song Hae-sung
- Jury Prize
