= The Restless (2006 film) =

2006 South Korean fantasy film by Jo Dong-oh

- Film poster
- Hangul: 중천
- Hanja: 中天
- RR: Jungcheon
- MR: Chungch'ŏn
- Directed by: Jo Dong-oh
- Written by: Jo Dong-oh; Choi Hee-dae; Choi Dong-hoon; Bang Ae-kyeong; Han Gwi-sook
- Produced by: Choi Jeong-hwa; Jang Si-ah; Jo Min-hwan; Kim Sung-su
- Starring: Jung Woo-sung; Kim Tae-hee; Huh Joon-ho
- Cinematography: Kim Young-ho
- Edited by: Nam Na-yeong
- Music by: Shirō Sagisu
- Production company: Nabi Pictures
- Distributed by: CJ Entertainment
- Release date: December 20, 2006 (South Korea)
- Running time: 105 minutes
- Country: South Korea
- Language: Korean
- Budget: $10 million
- Box office: $9 million

The Restless (Korean: 중천) is a 2006 South Korean period fantasy film directed by Jo Dong-oh, starring Jung Woo-sung and Kim Tae-hee. The film's Korean title, Joong-cheon, is literally translated as "Midheaven". Demon Empire is an alternative English name for the film.

== Plot summary ==
In ancient Korea, Yi Gwak is a former chief of a disbanded elite ghost-hunting military unit who makes a living as an itinerant demon hunter. Betrayed and poisoned by the destitute villagers of a town he saved from demons, he flees the town and passes out in an abandoned shrine. He awakes in Midheaven (a transitional place for the spirits of the deceased) and finds the spirit of his lover Yon-hwa (who had been accused of witchcraft and killed); he finds that she has voluntarily discarded her memories and suffering in order to assume a new name and title. Yi Gwak also encounters his former mentor Ban-chu, who is revealed to be masterminding a demonic rebellion in Midheaven along with other members of their former elite unit in order to invade the living world and take revenge for the injustices done to them when they were alive. Yon-hwa (now going by So-hwa) is entrusted with guarding the soul essence of Lord Chon-hon, which is needed by Ban-chu to access the world of the living, and as a result is being hunted by Ban-chu and his forces. While initially reluctant to fight his former comrades and his mentor, Yi Gwak chooses to protect So-hwa and finds himself at odds with Ban-chu and his former brothers-in-arms.

== Cast ==
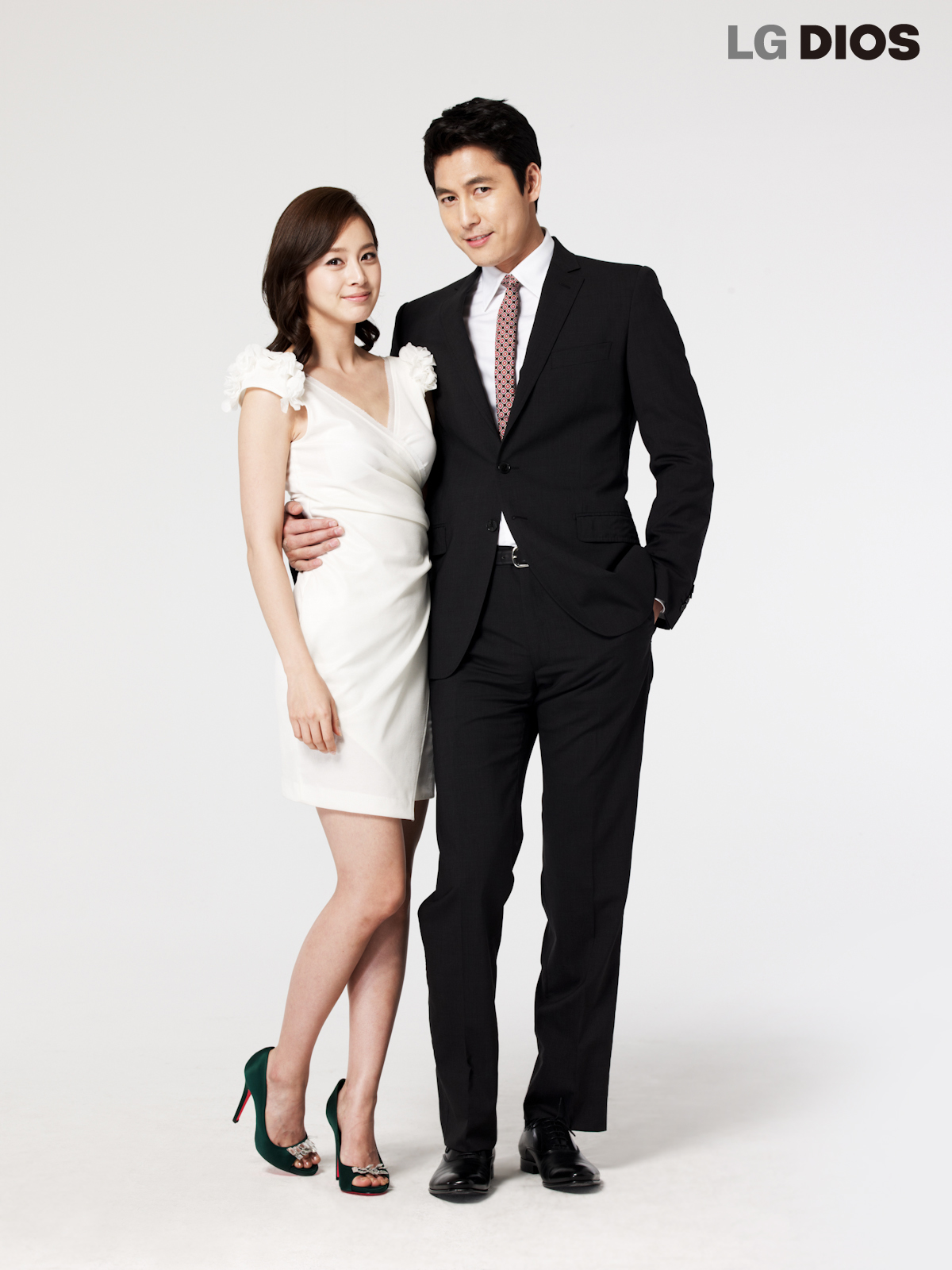
Main actors Jung Woo-sung and Kim Tae-hee in 2011.

- Jung Woo-sung as Yi-gwak
- Kim Tae-hee as So-hwa/Yon-hwa
- Huh Joon-ho as Ban-chu
- Park Sang-wook as Yeo-wi
- So Yi-hyun as Hyo
- Kim Kwang-il
- Yoo Ha-joon
- Park Jeong-hak
- Jo Jae-yoon

== Awards and nominations ==
2007 Asian Film Awards

- Nomination - Best Visual Effects - DTI, ETRI

2007 Blue Dragon Film Awards

- Technical Award - DTI, ETRI (CG)
- Nomination - Best New Actress - Kim Tae-hee
- Nomination - Best Art Direction - Kim Ki-chul

2007 Grand Bell Awards

- Best Art Direction - Kim Ki-chul
- Best Visual Effects - DTI, ETRI, Shin Jae-ho, Jeong Do-an
- Nomination - Best New Actress - Kim Tae-hee
- Nomination - Best Cinematography - Kim Young-ho
- Nomination - Best Costume Design - Emi Wada
- Nomination - Best Sound - Kim Kyung-tae, Choi Tae-young

2007 Korean Film Awards

- Nomination - Best New Actress - Kim Tae-hee
- Nomination - Best Visual Effects - DTI, ETRI, Shin Jae-ho, Jeong Do-an
- Nomination - Best Sound - Kim Kyung-tae, Choi Tae-young

== Soundtrack ==
=== Memory of the Restless OST ===
The first soundtrack, Memory of The Restless OST, was released as an EP on Dec 14, 2006 by CJ Entertainment.

1. "If Memory Ran Out" (Korean: 기억이 마르면; RR: Gieogi mareumyeon) – MayBee
2. "Memories of Midair" (Korean: 손톱달; RR: Sontopdal) – Wheesung
3. "If Memory Ran Out" (Japanese: 記憶の果てに (Japanese Ver))
4. "Memories of Midair" (Japanese: 三日月 (Japanese Ver.))
5. "If Memory Ran Out" (Chinese: 中天 (Chinese Ver.))
6. "Memories of Midair" (Chinese: 月色 (Chinese Ver.))
7. "If Memory Ran Out" (Instrumental)
8. "Memories of Midair" (Instrumental)

=== The Restless OST ===
A longer soundtrack, titled The Restless OST, was released on Jan 19, 2007 by CJ Entertainment. It consists of the background music played throughout the film. All music was composed by Shirō Sagisu.

1. "lawrence" (폐허의 마을)
2. "Unforgettable Her Face, Overhanging Dangers" (지울 수 없는 얼굴)
3. "The Tragedy" (비련; 悲戀)
4. "The Dark Place" (어둠의 공간)
5. "Listen To The Wisdom" (지혜의 말)
6. "Perspective Melody" (피안; 彼岸)
7. "The Bond II" (비운; 悲運)
8. "To The End" (비운의 끝)
9. "49 Days Before Heaven" (천상으로 가는 49일)
10. "Fantasy Of The Fate" (운명 영원히 끝나지 않을 인연)
11. "Clinging Feud" (비련의 다른 얼굴)
12. "Petal Colours From My Heart" (마음에 피는 꽃)
13. "Masculine Muse" (기억의 울림)
14. "Listen To The Love" (사랑에게 듣다)
15. "Beautiful Moment" (축복의 시간)
16. "Spiritual World" (영혼계)
17. "Petals Battle" (날카로운 꽃잎)
18. "Impossible Love" (이룰 수 없는 사랑)
19. "Love Supreme" (사랑이 할 수 있는 것)
20. "Catastrophe" (파국; 破局)
21. "Let Me Save Her" (그녀에게 가는 길)
22. "The Final Reckoning" (최후의 전투)
23. "The Tragedy" (비극; 悲劇)
24. "And The Finest Power" (그리고, 진실한 힘)
25. "The Quiet Of Love" (사랑을 위한 침묵)
