= Boomerang Family =

2013 South Korean comedy-drama film directed by Song Hae-sung

- Film poster
- Hangul: 고령화 가족
- Hanja: 高齡化 家族
- RR: Goryeonghwa gajok
- MR: Koryŏnghwa kajok
- Directed by: Song Hae-sung
- Screenplay by: Kim Hae-gon; Kim Jae-hwan; Song Hae-sung
- Based on: Aging Family by Cheon Myeong-kwan
- Produced by: Na Gyeong-chan; Kim Dong-hyun
- Starring: Park Hae-il; Yoon Je-moon; Gong Hyo-jin; Youn Yuh-jung; Jin Ji-hee
- Cinematography: Hong Kyung-pyo
- Edited by: Park Gok-ji
- Music by: Lee Jae-jin
- Production company: Invent Stone Corp.
- Distributed by: CJ Entertainment
- Release date: May 9, 2013
- Running time: 112 minutes
- Country: South Korea
- Language: Korean
- Box office: $7.1 million

Boomerang Family (Korean: 고령화 가족; RR: Goryeonghwa gajok; lit. 'Aging Family') is a 2013 South Korean comedy-drama film directed by Song Hae-sung, and starring Park Hae-il, Yoon Je-moon, Gong Hyo-jin, Youn Yuh-jung, and Jin Ji-hee. Based on the 2010 novel Aging Family by Cheon Myeong-kwan, the film is about three misfit siblings in their thirties and forties who all decide to move back in with their mother.

== Plot ==
Film director Oh In-mo is a 40-year-old movie director who has been jobless for the past decade after his debut film was a commercial and critical flop. Mired in poverty and depressed at his wife's affair, he decides to hang himself. But a well-timed call from his mother inviting him to dinner results in a change of plans. Instead of committing suicide, he decides to move into his mother's home, where his older brother Han-mo also lives.

A 44-year-old unemployed ex-gangster with five criminal convictions, Han-mo is not particularly pleased at this development. But more trouble lies ahead: younger sister Mi-yeon arrives with her bratty, rebellious 15-year-old daughter Min-kyung. 35-year-old Mi-yeon announces that she is leaving her second husband, and that she needs to stay with them for the immediate future. Thus the dysfunctional family is reunited, revealing petty conflicts, sibling rivalries and largely unexpressed affection, as they struggle with the challenges of middle age.

== Cast ==
- Park Hae-il as Oh In-mo
- Yoon Je-moon as Oh Han-mo
- Gong Hyo-jin as Oh Mi-yeon
- Youn Yuh-jung as Mom
- Jin Ji-hee as Shin Min-kyung, Mi-yeon's daughter
- Ye Ji-won as Han Soo-ja, hairdresser
- Kim Young-jae as Jung Geun-bae, Mi-yeon's boyfriend
- Yoo Seung-mok as drug peddler
- Park Young-seo as Ki-soo, Han-mo's thief friend
- Lee Young-jin as Seo Mi-ok, In-mo's wife
- Jung Young-gi as Jang, Mi-yeon's husband
- Kim Hae-gon as Kim, porno producer
- Kim Dae-jin as Choi
- Yoo Yeon-mi as Min-kyung's school friend
- Han Sung-yong as restaurant customer
- Oh Min-ae as landlady
- Woo Hye-jin as Mi-yeon's wedding friend
- Hwang Byung-gook as wedding photographer
- Park Geun-hyung as Mr. Gu, Mom's male friend
- Kim Ji-young as Sang-geun's woman
- Yang Hee-kyung as Jung-hyun's woman
- Kim Kyung-ae as Jung-bok's woman

== Awards and nominations ==
2013 50th Grand Bell Awards

- Nomination - Best Director - Song Hae-sung
- Nomination - Best Actress - Youn Yuh-jung
- Nomination - Best Supporting Actress - Jin Ji-hee
