= The King and the Clown =

2005 South Korean historical drama film

- Theatrical poster
- Hangul: 왕의 남자
- Hanja: 王의 男子
- Lit.: The King's Man
- RR: Wangui namja
- MR: Wangŭi namja
- Directed by: Lee Joon-ik
- Written by: Choi Seok-hwan
- Based on: Yi by Kim Tae-woong
- Produced by: Jeong Jin-wan; Lee Joon-ik
- Starring: Kam Woo-sung; Jung Jin-young; Lee Joon-gi
- Cinematography: Ji Kil-woong
- Edited by: Kim Sang-bum; Kim Jae-bum
- Music by: Lee Byung-woo
- Production companies: Cineworld; Eagle Pictures
- Distributed by: Cinema Service; CJ Entertainment (international)
- Release date: December 29, 2005 (South Korea)
- Running time: 119 minutes
- Country: South Korea
- Language: Korean
- Budget: US$3.5 million
- Box office: US$74.5 million

The King and the Clown (Korean: 왕의 남자) is a 2005 South Korean historical drama film starring Kam Woo-sung, Jung Jin-young, and Lee Joon-gi. It was adapted from the 2000 stage play, Yi ("You") about Yeonsangun of Joseon, a Joseon dynasty king and a court clown who mocks him. It was released on 29 December 2005, runs for 119 minutes; and distributed domestically by Cinema Service and internationally by CJ Entertainment.

The movie is referred to by various titles. It is sometimes known as The King's Man (the literal English translation of the Korean title). In Chinese, the title is "王的男人" or "王和小丑", and in Japanese, it is known as "王の男". It is also known as The Royal Jester in English, as the movie's English translator found it more fitting than the original title.

The film was chosen as South Korea's official submission for the 2006 Academy Award for Best Foreign Language Film. With over 12.3 million tickets sold, it was the most watched movie of South Korea of the year, as well the 13th highest-grossing film in South Korea.

== Plot ==
Set in the late 15th century during the reign of King Yeonsan, two male street clowns and tightrope walkers, Jangsaeng (Kam Woo-sung) and Gong-gil (Lee Joon-gi), are part of an entertainer troupe, with the effeminate and beautiful Gong-gil specializing in female roles. As their manager prostitutes Gong-gil to customers, Jangsaeng engages in a row with the manager in an effort to protect Gong-gil, who, in turn, kills the manager in Jangsaeng's defense. After that, the pair flee to Seoul, where they form a new group with three other street performers.

The group comes up with a skit mocking some members of the royal court, including the king and his prostitute-turned-concubine Jang Nok-su, but are eventually arrested for treason and flogged severely. Jangsaeng makes a deal with Choseon, one of the king's consultants, either to make the king laugh at their skit or to be executed. They perform their skit for the king, but the three minor performers are too terrified to perform well. Gong-gil and Jangsaeng barely save themselves with one last joke at the king, who laughs and then makes them all a part of his court.

When the king wants to see more performances, the clowns decide to make flyers asking for other minstrels to audition to join the group. The other clowns notice that Jangsaeng and Gong-gil have identical handwriting, as Jangsaeng learned to write by watching Gong-gil. The corruption within the court is revealed when the clowns put on a performance ridiculing the council members by implying that they receive expensive gifts for favours. The king is delighted by the skit, but upon seeing that the council members are not amused, turns on them and asks them one by one if they are guilty of what the clowns are mocking them for. He banishes a corrupt minister and orders that his fingers be cut off and displayed to all the other council members as a warning.

Over time, the king falls for Gong-gil, whom he often calls to his private chambers to perform finger puppet shows. Their relationship, as well as the king's bloodthirst, disturbs Jangsaeng that he suggests leaving, but Gong-gil does not immediately agree. Meanwhile, the king becomes more and more unstable. Choseon, who claims to relay the king's order, makes the clowns perform a skit depicting how the king's mother (played by Gong-gil), the favorite concubine of the former king, was forced to take poison after being betrayed by other jealous concubines. The king then slaughters these concubines at the end of the play, and the Queen Mother dies from shock. Jangsaeng then asks Gong-gil to leave with him and the gang once more before the king kills them too during one of his homicidal fits. Gong-gil, who initially sympathized with the king, begs the tyrant to give him his freedom but the king refuses.

Meanwhile, Nok-su becomes increasingly enraged by the attention the king has been lavishing on Gong-gil. The council members try to have him killed during a hunting trip, resulting in the death of one of the members of the street performing team. Days after the hunting trip, the king forcibly kisses Gong-gil while his violence against the members of his own court escalates, especially at the mention of his father who he feels still rules over the kingdom even after his death. This leads the performing troupe to finally decide to leave the palace, because the king has become too unpredictable, but Gong-gil begs Jangsaeng not to leave him alone as he is not allowed to leave the palace. Then, Jang Noksu tries to have Gong-gil jailed by having flyers run in Gong-gil's handwriting insulting the king severely. Jangsaeng takes the blame for the crime for which Gong-gil has been falsely accused, as their handwriting is the same, and is set to be beheaded the next morning.

Choseon secretly releases Jangsaeng, however, telling him that he should forget Gong-gil and leave the palace. But Jangsaeng ignores the advice and returns to walk on his tightrope across palace rooftops, this time openly and loudly mocking the king. The king shoots arrows at him while Gong-gil tries in vain to stop him. Jangsaeng falls and is caught, and has his eyes seared with burning iron as punishment before being thrown into prison again. Gong-gil attempts suicide, but his life is saved by the palace doctors: the king then loses interest in him and goes back to Nok-su, who jeers at his fickleness. The king wants to send for Choseon, unaware that Choseon has hanged himself after refusing to join an upcoming coup against the king.

The king has Jangsaeng walk his tightrope blind. As Jangsaeng tells the story of his and Gong-gil's trials and tribulations while balancing on the rope, Gong-gil runs out to join him. Gong-gil asks Jangsaeng what he would like to return as in his next life and Jangsaeng replies that he would still choose to be a clown. Gong-gil answers that he too would return as nothing else but a clown. Near the end, during the Jungjong coup, people storm the court. Jangsaeng and Gong-gil jump from the rope together, while the king remains mesmerized by their performance. The last scene is a happy one where Jangsaeng and Gong-gil appear to be reunited with their clowning troupe, including the friend who died earlier during the hunting incident. The whole company jokes, sings and dances, as they all walk away cheerfully into the distance.

== Cast ==
- Kam Woo-sung as Jang-saeng
- Jung Jin-young as King Yeonsan
- Kang Sung-yeon as Jang Nok-su
- Lee Joon-gi as Gong-gil
- Jang Hang-sun as Cheo-sun
- Yoo Hae-jin as Yuk-gab
- Jeong Seok-yong as Chil-duk
- Lee Seung-hun as Pal-bok

== Background ==
The film was adapted from the Korean stage play Yi, written by Kim Tae-woong, centered around Gong-gil, the feminine actor. It was based on a small passage from the Annals of the Joseon Dynasty that briefly mentions the king's favorite clown, Gong-gil, whereas Jang-saeng is a fictional character. In the Joseon period, "Yi" was what the king called his beloved subjects. Since first staged in 2000, the play has won numerous awards, including the best stage play of the year, best new actor (for Oh Man-seok) and top 3 best plays of the year by the National Theater Association of Korea, and best stage play for 2001 by the Dong-A Art Foundation.

== Original soundtrack ==
1. "가려진" - "Veiled" by Jang Jae-hyeong (Jang-seng's theme)
2. "프롤로그 - 먼길" - "Prologue - Long Roads"
3. "각시탈" - "Gak-shi Tal (Mask of a Woman)"
4. "돌아올 수 없는" - "Cannot Return"
5. "너 거기 있니? 나 여기 있어." - "Are you over there? I am over here."
6. "세상속으로" - "Into the World"
7. "위험한 제의 하나" - "Dangerous Suggestion Number One"
8. "행복한 광대들" - "The Happy Clowns"
9. "내가 왕이 맞느냐" - "Am I the King or not"
10. "위험한 제의 둘" - "Dangerous Suggestion Number Two"
11. "꿈꾸는 광대들" - "The Dreaming Clowns"
12. "수청" - "Serve Maiden"
13. "인형놀이" - "Playing with Dolls"
14. "연정" - "Romantic Emotions"
15. "그림자놀이" - "Playing with Shadows"
16. "피적삼의 울음소리" - "The Cry of Rags"
17. "광대사냥" - "Clown Hunt"
18. "광대의 죽음" - "Death of a Clown"
19. "어서 쏴" - "Shoot Now"
20. "질투" - "Envy"
21. "장생의 분노" - "The Fury of Jang-Seng"
22. "내가 썼소" - "I wrote it."
23. "애원" - "Plea"
24. "장생의 외침" - "The Yell of Jang-Seng"
25. "눈먼장생" - "Jang-Seng the Blind"
26. "자궁속으로" - "Into the Womb"
27. "반정의 북소리" - "Ban-Jeong's Sounds of Drumming"
28. "반허공" - "Mid-air"
29. "에필로그 - 돌아오는 길" - "Epilogue - The Homeward Road"
30. "반허공" Guitar Version - "Mid-air" Guitar Version

== Reception ==
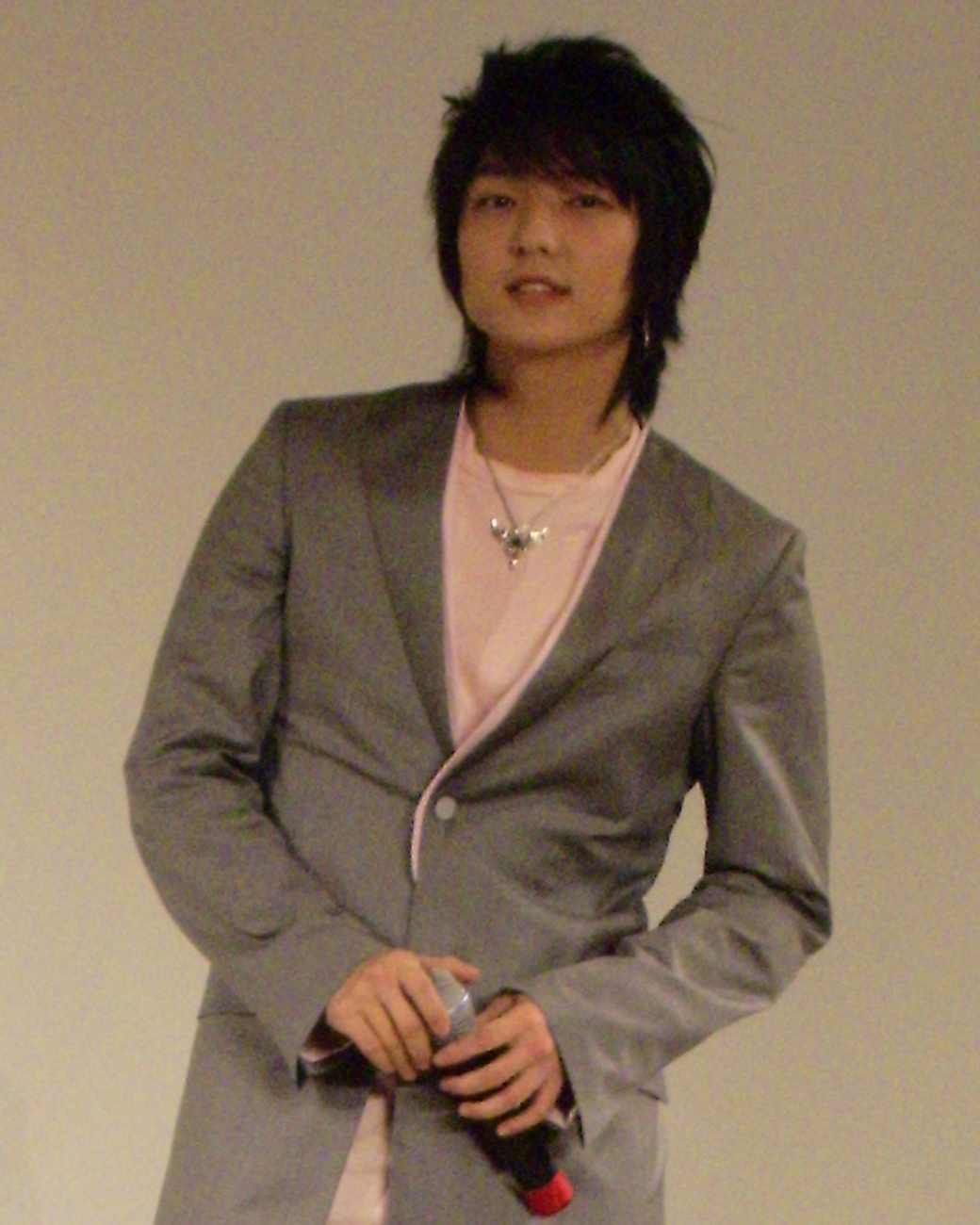
Lee Joon-gi at a King and the Clown fan meeting in Jeju Island

In South Korea, the film sold a total of 12.3 million tickets, including 3,659,525 in Seoul, in its four months of screening, which ended on 18 April 2006. It ranked first and grossed ₩6.5 billion in its first week of release and grossed a total of ₩72.6 billion after 12 weeks of screening. Its worldwide grossed is US$74.4 million.

For a low-budget film costing only ₩4 billion, it surpassed the 10 million viewer mark on 2 February, received good reviews from both critics and audiences. This led to its commercial success, which is remarkable, considering its focus on traditional arts with homosexual themes. The success was also surprising given the lack of a big budget and high-profile top-billing actors and director compared to other films such as Taegukgi: Brotherhood of War and Silmido, who have both surpassed 10 million viewers. The film also notably propelled the then unknown Lee Joon-gi into Asia-wide stardom.

This film was chosen by the Korea Film Council-appointed committee as South Korea's submission for the 2006 Academy Award for Best Foreign Language Film. It was selected over two other films: The Host and Time for its overall aesthetic and commercial quality.

Nafees Ahmed of High On Films called the film 'a Shakespearean tragedy' and wrote, "It's a well written and directed historical drama that weaves the emotional nuances of the king and two clowns into the layered drama about love, jealousy, madness and compassion."

== International release ==
- Taiwan: May 7, 2006
- Singapore: June 22, 2006
- Canada: September 7, 2006 (Vancouver/Toronto Film Festival)
- Japan: October 21, 2006 (Tokyo Film Festival) / December 9, 2006 (theatrical release)
- Shanghai: October 28, 2006
- United Kingdom: October 29, 2006 (London Film Festival)
- South Africa: November 14, 2006 (Cape Town Film Festival)
- New Zealand: December 1, 2006 (Film Festival)
- United States: January 3, 2007 (Los Angeles)
- Italy: March 30, 2007 (Florence Film Festival)
- France: April 1, 2007 (Deauville Film Festival) / 23 January 2008 (theatrical release)

== Awards and nominations ==
2006 Baeksang Arts Awards

- Grand Prize for Film
- Best New Actor - Lee Joon-gi
- Nomination - Best Film
- Nomination - Best Director - Lee Joon-ik
- Nomination - Best Actor - Jung Jin-young
- Nomination - Best Screenplay - Choi Seok-hwan

2006 Chunsa Film Art Awards

- Best Actor - Kam Woo-sung
- Best Supporting Actor - Jang Hang-sun

2006 Grand Bell Awards

- Best Film
- Best Director - Lee Joon-ik
- Best Actor - Kam Woo-sung
- Best Supporting Actor - Yoo Hae-jin
- Best New Actor - Lee Joon-gi
- Best Screenplay - Choi Seok-hwan
- Best Cinematography - Ji Kil-woong
- Nomination - Best Supporting Actress - Kang Sung-yeon
- Nomination - Best Editing - Kim Jae-bum, Kim Sang-bum
- Nomination - Best Lighting - Han Gi-eop
- Nomination - Best Art Direction - Kang Seung-yong
- Nomination - Best Costume Design - Shim Hyun-sub
- Nomination - Best Music - Lee Byung-woo
- Nomination - Best Sound - Kim Tan-young, Choi Tae-young

2006 Blue Dragon Film Awards

- Best Music - Lee Byung-woo
- Nomination - Best Film
- Nomination - Best Director - Lee Joon-ik
- Nomination - Best Actor - Kam Woo-sung
- Nomination - Best Supporting Actor - Yoo Hae-jin
- Nomination - Best Supporting Actress - Kang Sung-yeon
- Nomination - Best New Actor - Lee Joon-gi
- Nomination - Best Lighting - Han Gi-eop
- Nomination - Best Art Direction - Kang Seung-yong
- Nomination - Technical Award - Kim Sang-bum, Kim Jae-bum (Editing)

2006 Korean Film Awards

- Best New Actor - Lee Joon-gi
- Nomination - Best Film
- Nomination - Best Director - Lee Joon-ik
- Nomination - Best Supporting Actress - Kang Sung-yeon
- Nomination - Best Art Direction - Kang Seung-yong

2007 Deauville Asian Film Festival

- Jury Prize

== See also ==
- List of lesbian, gay, bisexual, or transgender-related films by storyline
