= Deauville Asian Film Festival =

French film festival

Coordinates: 49.36°N 0.08°E

The Deauville Asian Film Festival (the Festival du film asiatique de Deauville) took place annually in Deauville, France from 1999 to 2014. A film competition was added to the festival in 2000 and a video competition in 2002.

== Prize List ==
=== 2000 ===
- Lotus d'Or (Prix du Jury) ("Jury Prize"): (South Korea) Sur la Trace du Serpent ("Nowhere to Hide"), directed by Lee Myung-se
- Lotus du Public (Prix du Public) ("Popular Choice"): (Hong Kong) The Mistress, directed by Crystal Kwok
- Lotus de la Meilleure Photographie ("Best Photography"): (South Korea) Jeong Kwang-Seok and Song Haeng-ki, for Sur la Trace du Serpent ("Nowhere to Hide")
- Lotus de la Meilleure Actrice ("Best Actress"): (China) Tao Hong, for Hei Yanjing ("Colors of the Blind") directed by Chen Guoxing
- Lotus du Meilleur Acteur ("Best Actor"): (South Korea) Park Joong-hoon, for Sur la Trace du Serpent ("Nowhere to Hide")
- Lotus du Meilleur Réalisateur: (South Korea) Lee Myung-se, for Sur la Trace du Serpent ("Nowhere to Hide")

=== 2001 ===
- Lotus d'Or (Prix du Jury) ("Jury Prize"): (South Korea) Joint Security Area, directed by Park Chan-wook
- Lotus du Public (Prix du Public) ("Popular Choice"): (South Korea) Joint Security Area, directed by Park Chan-wook
- Lotus de la Meilleure Photographie ("Best Photography"): (Japan) Takashiro Tsutai, for Hotoke, directed by Jinsei Tsuji
- Lotus de la Meilleure Actrice ("Best Actress"): (China) Yu Nan, for Yue shi, directed by Wang Quan'an
- Lotus du Meilleur Acteur ("Best Actor"): (South Korea) Song Kang-ho, for Joint Security Area, directed by Park Chan-wook
- Lotus du Meilleur Réalisateur: (Thailand) Tanit Jitnukul for Bang Rajan
- Lotus du Meilleur Réalisateur: (Taiwan) Yiwen Chen and Huakun Zhang, for The Cabbie

=== 2002 ===
- Lotus d'Or (Prix du Jury) ("Jury Prize"): (South Korea) Failan, directed by Song Hae-sung
- Lotus du Public (Prix du Public) ("Popular Choice"): (South Korea) Failan, directed by Song Hae-sung
- Lotus de la Meilleure Photographie ("Best Photography"): (Hong Kong) Youyuan Jingmeng ("Peony Pavilion"), directed by Yonfan
- Lotus de la Meilleure Actrice ("Best Actress"): (Indonesia) Dian Sastrowardoyo for Pasir Berbisik ("Whispering Sands")
- Lotus du Meilleur Acteur ("Best Actor"): (South Korea) Choi Min-sik for Failan
- Lotus du Meilleur Réalisateur: (South Korea) Song Hae-sung for Failan
- Lotus du Meilleur Scénario: (Taiwan) The Rule of the Game, directed by Ho Ping
- Lotus Numérique: (Japan) Gipusu (Gips), directed by Akihiko Shiota
- Lotus Numérique: (Japan) Tokyo Gomi Onna ("Tokyo Trash Baby"), directed by Ryuichi Hiroki

=== 2003 ===
- Lotus d'Or (Prix du Jury) ("Jury Prize"): (China) Blind Shaft, directed by Li Yang
- Lotus du Public (Prix du Public) ("Popular Choice"): (China) Blind Shaft, directed by Li Yang
- Lotus de la Meilleure Actrice ("Best Actress"): (Indonesia) Rachel Sayidina and Jajang C. Noer for Eliana, Eliana
- Lotus du Meilleur Acteur ("Best Actor"): (China) Wang Baoqiang for Blind Shaft
- Lotus du Meilleur Réalisateur: (China) Li Yang for Blind Shaft
- Lotus numérique: (Japan) Koboreru Tsuki ("Moon Overflowing"), directed by Ryota Sakamaki
- Lotus Air France, Décerné par la Presse: (China) Blind Shaft

=== 2004 ===
- Lotus du Meilleur Film (Grand Prix): (South Korea) Une Femme Coréenne ("A Good Lawyer's Wife"), directed by Im Sang-soo
- Lotus du Public (Prix du Public) ("Popular Choice"): (Australia) (Bhutan) Voyageurs and Magiciens ("Travellers and Magicians"), directed by Khyentse Norbu
- Lotus Action Asia (Grand Prix Action Asia): (Thailand) Ong-bak, directed by Prachya Pinkaew

=== 2005 ===
- Lotus du Meilleur Film (Grand Prix): (Taiwan) Mengyou Hawaii ("Holiday Dreaming"), directed by Fun-chun Hsu
- Lotus du Jury (Prix du Jury) ("Jury Prize"): (South Korea) This Charming Girl, directed by Lee Yoon-ki
- Lotus du Meilleur Scénario (Prix du Groupe Lucien Barrière): (China) The World, directed by Jia Zhangke
- Lotus Action Asia (Grand Prix Action Asia): (South Korea) Arahan, directed by Ryoo Seung-wan
- Lotus Air France (Prix de la Critique Internationale): (Taiwan) Mengyou Hawaii ("Holiday Dreaming"), directed by Fun-chun Hsu
- Lotus Première (Prix du Magazine Première): (China) Electric Shadows, directed by Xiao Jiang

=== 2006 ===
- Lotus du Meilleur Film ("Best Film"): (China) Dam Street, Li Yu
- Lotus du Jury ("Jury Prize"): (South Korea) Piteopaeneui Gongshik ("The Peter Pan Formula") directed by Cho Chang-ho
- Lotus de la Critique Internationale: (Thailand) Citizen Dog
- Lotus du Meilleur Scénario: (Thailand) Cherm ("Midnight My Love")
- Lotus Action Asia (Grand Prix Action Asia): (South Korea) A Bittersweet Life directed by Kim Jee-woon

=== 2007 ===
- Lotus du Meilleur Film ("Best Film"): (Thailand) Syndromes and a Century directed by Apichatpong Weerasethakul
- Lotus du Jury ("Jury Prize"): (South Korea) King and the Clown directed by Lee Joon-ik
- Lotus Air France (Prix de la Critique Internationale) ("International Critics' Prize): (South Korea) Ad-lib Night directed by Lee Yoon-ki
- Lotus Action Asia: (Hong Kong) Dog Bite Dog directed by Soi Cheang

=== 2008 ===
- Lotus du Meilleur Film ("Best Film"): (South Korea) With a Girl of Black Soil directed by Jeon Soo-il
- Lotus du Jury ("Jury Prize"): (Malaysia) Flower in the Pocket directed by Seng Tat Liew and (Thailand) Wonderful Town directed by Aditya Assarat
- Lotus Air France (Prix de la Critique Internationale) ("International Critics' Prize): (South Korea) With a Girl of Black Soil directed by Jeon Soo-il

=== 2009 ===
- Lotus du Meilleur Film ("Best Film"): (South Korea) Breathless directed by Yang Ik-june
- Lotus du Jury ("Jury Prize"): (Japan) All around us directed by Ryosuke Hashiguchi and (China) The Shaft directed by Zhang Chi
- Lotus Air France (Prix de la Critique Internationale) ("International Critics' Prize): (South Korea) Breathless directed by Yang Ik-june
- Lotus Action Asia: (South Korea) The Chaser directed by Na Hong-jin

=== 2010 ===
- Lotus du Meilleur Film ("Best Film"): (China) Judge directed by Liu Jie
- Lotus du Jury ("Jury Prize"): (Taiwan) Au Revoir Taipei directed by Arvin Chen and (South Korea) Paju directed by Park Chan-ok
- Lotus Air France (Prix de la Critique Internationale) ("International Critics' Prize): (Malaysia) My Daughter directed by Charlotte Lim Lay Kuen
- Lotus Action Asia: (South Korea) The Sword with No Name directed by Kim Yong-gyun

== See also ==
- Deauville American Film Festival
