= For Horowitz =

- Theatrical poster
- Hangul: 호로비츠를 위하여
- RR: Horobicheureul wihayeo
- MR: Horobich'ŭrŭl wihayŏ
- Directed by: Kwon Hyung-jin
- Written by: Kim Min-sook
- Produced by: Cha Seung-jae; Kim Mi-hee
- Starring: Uhm Jung-hwa; Shin Eui-jae; Park Yong-woo
- Cinematography: Hwang Dong-guk
- Edited by: Steve M. Choe; Kim Chang-ju
- Music by: Lee Byung-woo
- Production company: Sidus FNH
- Distributed by: Showbox/Mediaplex
- Release date: May 25, 2006
- Running time: 108 minutes
- Country: South Korea
- Language: Korean
- Box office: US$2,534,758

For Horowitz (Korean: 호로비츠를 위하여) is a 2006 South Korean drama film directed by Kwon Hyung-jin and starring Uhm Jung-hwa, Shin Eui-jae and Park Yong-woo.

== Plot ==
Kim Ji-soo is a 30-year-old single woman who once dreamed about becoming a world-class pianist, but ends up opening a small neighborhood piano school on the outskirts of Seoul, where she teaches children to play.

She then meets Yoon Gyung-min, a 7-year-old orphaned boy who starts pestering her for no apparent reason. Gyung-min's parents died in a car accident, and he now lives with his uncaring grandmother. He is a troublemaker, emotionally distant from his peers, and possibly autistic.

When Ji-soo discovers that Gyung-min has untapped musical genius, she becomes determined to turn him into a renowned pianist like Vladimir Horowitz. She does this for her own selfish reasons, because if she gains the reputation of being a great piano teacher, that would lead to her school's success.

She uses music to communicate with her gifted student, ruthlessly giving him intensive piano lessons to prepare him for competitions. But their relationship turns maternal when Ji-soo realizes what the boy really needs is love.

== Cast ==
- Uhm Jung-hwa as Kim Ji-soo
- Shin Eui-jae as Yoon Gyung-min
- Park Yong-woo as Shim Kwang-ho
- Choi Seon-ja as Gyung-min's grandmother
- Yoon Ye-ri as Jung-eun
- Jung In-gi as Ji-soo's older brother
- Yang Kkot-nim as Ji-soo's sister-in-law
- Park Young-seo as Pizza shop employee
- Ko Tae-ho as Bo-ram
- Lee Seung-hyun as Yoo-sik
- Kang Soo-jin as Ye-ri
- Choi Yoon-sun as So-young
- Kim Bo-ra as Min-hee
- Seo Ji-ah as Mi-ra
- Lee Oi-seon as Cleaner Lee
- Kim Jong-min as Taekwondo Kim
- Jo Seok-hyun as Video Park
- Julius Jeongwon Kim as Adult Gyung-min (cameo)

== Box office ==
For Horowitz was released in South Korea on May 25, 2006. It drew 544,656 admissions during its theatrical run.

== Awards and nominations ==
Year	Award	Category	Recipient	Result
2006	27th Blue Dragon Film Awards	Best Actress	Uhm Jung-hwa	Nominated
2006	27th Blue Dragon Film Awards	Best New Director	Kwon Hyung-jin	Nominated
2006	27th Blue Dragon Film Awards	Best Music	Lee Byung-woo	Nominated
2006	27th Blue Dragon Film Awards	Technical Award	Ryu Hyeon (Sound)	Nominated
2006	5th Korean Film Awards	Best Actress	Uhm Jung-hwa	Nominated
2006	5th Korean Film Awards	Best Music	Lee Byung-woo	Won
2007	44th Grand Bell Awards	Best Actress	Uhm Jung-hwa	Nominated
2007	44th Grand Bell Awards	Best New Director	Kwon Hyung-jin	Won
2007	44th Grand Bell Awards	Best Screenplay	Kim Min-sook	Nominated
2007	44th Grand Bell Awards	Best Editing	Steve M. Choe, Kim Chang-ju	Nominated
2007	44th Grand Bell Awards	Best Music	Lee Byung-woo	Nominated
2007	44th Grand Bell Awards	Best Sound	Ryu Hyeon, Choi Tae-young	Nominated
2007	10th Shanghai International Film Festival	Asia New Talent Award	For Horowitz	Nominated
