= Lump Sugar =

- Theatrical release poster
- Hangul: 각설탕
- Hanja: 각雪糖
- RR: Gakseoltang
- MR: Kaksŏlt'ang
- Directed by: Lee Hwan-kyung
- Written by: Kim Yeong-seok; Lee Gwi-yong; Lee Hoon-min
- Produced by: Cha Seung-jae; Kim Mi-hee
- Starring: Im Soo-jung; Park Eun-Soo
- Cinematography: Baek Dong-hyeon
- Edited by: Choi Jae-geun; Eom Jin-hwa
- Music by: Lee Dong-jun
- Distributed by: CJ Entertainment
- Release date: August 10, 2006 (South Korea)
- Running time: 124 minutes
- Country: South Korea
- Language: Korean

Lump Sugar (or Lump of Sugar; Korean: 각설탕) is a 2006 South Korean film directed by Lee Hwan-kyung and starring actress Im Soo-jung.

== Plot ==
The film revolves around Si-eun (played by Im), who dreams of becoming a famous jockey. It is the first Korean movie to show the friendship between a human and a horse and to feature a horse race.

== Cast ==
- Im Soo-jung as Kim Shi-eun
  - Kim You-jung as young Kim Shi-eun
- Choi Hak-rak as Kim Jo
- Park Eun-soo as Ik-du (Shi-eun's dad)
- Yu Oh-seong as Yun-jo
