= Lee Byung-woo =

South Korean guitarist and composer (born 1965)

Lee Byeong-woo
- Born: January 22, 1965 (age 60); Seoul, South Korea
- Occupation(s): guitarist, composer
- Years active: 1986–present

Korean name
- Hangul: 이병우
- Hanja: 李丙雨
- RR: I Byeongu
- MR: I Pyŏngu

Lee Byeong-woo (Korean: 이병우; born January 22, 1965) is a South Korean guitarist and composer of film scores. He has composed music for more than twenty films, including the segment "Memories" in Three (2002), A Tale of Two Sisters (2003), All for Love (2005), The Host (2006) and Mother (2009).

Lee's music for A Tale of Two Sisters was described by OhmyNews as "one of the best film scores ever composed for a Korean film". He won Best Music at the 2004 Shanghai International Film Festival for Untold Scandal, and in 2006 his score for The King and the Clown won the same accolade at the Blue Dragon Film Awards. In 2007, Lee received a further Best Music nomination at the 44th Grand Bell Awards for For Horowitz.

== Filmography ==
- Three Friends (1996)
- Kill the Love (1996)
- My Beautiful Girl, Mari (2002)
- My Beautiful Days (2002)
- Three ("Memories") (2002)
- A Tale of Two Sisters (2003)
- Untold Scandal (2003)
- Rules of Dating (2005)
- The Red Shoes (2005)
- All for Love (2005)
- The King and the Clown (2005)
- For Horowitz (2006)
- The Host (2006)
- Voice of a Murderer (2007)
- Miracle on 1st Street (2007)
- Soo (2007)
- Bunt (2007)
- My Son (2007)
- Hansel and Gretel (2007)
- Tokyo! (2008)
- Haeundae (2009)
- Mother (2009)
- Harmony (2010)
- Romantic Heaven (2010)
- The Face Reader (2013)
- Ode to My Father (2014)
- Emergency Declaration (2021)
- Virus (2025)
