= Lee Joo-sil =

South Korean actress (1944–2025)

- Born: 8 March 1944; Bucheon, Korea, Empire of Japan
- Died: 2 February 2025 (aged 80); Uijeongbu, South Korea
- Education: Wonkwang University
- Occupation: Actress
- Years active: 1965–2025

Korean name
- Hangul: 이주실
- Hanja: 李周實
- RR: I Jusil
- MR: I Chusil

Lee Joo-sil (Korean: 이주실; 8 March 1944 – 2 February 2025) was a South Korean film, television and theatre actress. She was known for playing Hwang Jun-ho's mother in the second season of the South Korean dystopian survival thriller action television series Squid Game.

Lee began her acting career in live theater in 1965. At the 24th Baeksang Arts Awards, she won a Baeksang Arts Award in the category Best Theatre Actress. She earned her doctorate degree in public health from Wonkwang University in 2010.

In 1993, Lee was diagnosed with breast cancer but recovered ten years later. She died from stomach cancer at her family's home in Uijeongbu, on 2 February 2025, at the age of 80, having been diagnosed with the disease three months prior.

== Filmography ==
- A Single Spark (1995) - Tae-il's mother
- The Uninvited (2003) - Ms. Song
- Face (2004) - Hyun-min's mother
- Blossom Again (2005) - In-young's mother
- Running Wild (2006) - Do-young's mother
- The City of Violence (2006) - Seok-hwan's mother
- Hot for Teacher (2007) - Headmaster Nun
- Black House (2007) - Vice Principal
- Punch Lady (2007) - Ha-eun's mother
- Le Grand Chef (2007) - Han's mother
- Sunny (2008) - Mother-in-Law
- Antique (2008) - Jin-hyuk's grandmother
- Hello, Schoolgirl (2008) - Laundromat mother
- The Sword with No Name (2009) - Ja-yeong's mother
- The Tower (2012) - Mrs. Jung
- Commitment (2013) - Hwang Jeong-sook
- The Chosen: Forbidden Cave (2015) - Dol-soon's mother
- Oh My Ghost (2015) - Bong-sun's grandmother
- Tomorrow Victory (2015 – 2016) - Park Bok-soon
- Train to Busan (2016) - Seok-woo's mother
- Chang-ok's Letter (2017) - Chang-ok
- Bad Thief, Good Thief (2017) - Kim Soon-Cheon
- Notebook from My Mother (2018) - Ae Ran
- Sunkist Family (2019) - Grandmother
- Goo-hae-jwo (2019) - Sung Ho's grandmother
- Mystic Pop-up Bar (2020) - Lee Kkeut Sun
- Voice (2021) - Park Eun Soo's grandmother
- Hospital Playlist (2021) - Brain tumor patient
- The Witch's Diner (2021) - Lee Bok Nam
- Would You Like a Cup of Coffee? (2021) - Ms. Hwang
- Happiness (2021) - Ji Sung-Sil
- It's Beautiful Now (2022) - Jung Mi-Young
- Divorce Attorney Shin (2023) - Yang Bok-sun
- The Good Bad Mother (2023) - Jung Gum-ja's Mother-in-law
- The Uncanny Counter (2020 – 2023) - Jang Choon Ok, So Moon's grandmother
- Squid Game (2024) - Hwang Jun-Ho's mom
