= Lee So-sun =

South Korean trade unionist (1929–2011)

- Born: 1929; Dalseong, Korea, Empire of Japan
- Died: September 3, 2011 (aged 82); Seoul, South Korea
- Known for: Labor activism
- Children: 4: (Jeon Soon-ok; Jeon Tae-il)

Korean name
- Hangul: 이소선
- Hanja: 李小仙
- RR: I Soseon
- MR: I Sosŏn

Lee So-sun (Korean: 이소선; 1929 – September 3, 2011) was a South Korean labor activist. She became involved in the labor movement after her son Jeon Tae-il, a sewing worker and labor activist, self-immolated in protest of poor working conditions. She helped found the Cheonggye Garment Workers' Union and the Korean Association of Bereaved Families for Democracy, and was arrested multiple times by the government of South Korea. She continued to remain active in the labor movement until her death at the age of 82 in 2011. She is commonly referred to as the "mother of laborers" for her activism.

== Early life ==
Lee So-sun was born in 1929 in the village of Dalseong-gun in Korea under Japanese rule. Growing up in a poor family, her father was a farmer and was executed by Japanese colonial officers when she was four. Following her father's death, the family left their hometown and lived in vagrancy, living briefly in locations including a funeral parlor and with an elderly woman on Mount Waryong. Two years after her father's killing, Lee's mother remarried and moved the family to Park-sil village, where they worked as tenant farmers. Lee did not receive a formal education due to her family's financial status, but did self-learn math. In 1945 amidst World War II, Lee was forced by the colonial Japanese government to work in a textile factory in Daegu; her older sister died after getting caught in a machine at the factory.

Lee married Jeon Sang-su, a textile worker, in 1947. The couple had four children. The family moved to Busan in 1950 after Jeon Sang-su faced issues with creditors in Daegu, where Jeon Sang-su ran a textile shop. The family moved to Seoul after flooding severely damaged Jeon Sang-su's shop. In Seoul, Lee worked as a street food vendor and vegetable peddler before saving enough money to buy a sewing machine. During the mid-1960s, she lived in a shanty town on Namsan Mountain until a fire broke out in the neighborhood, leaving her homeless. She temporarily lived along the bank of a stream in Dobong-dong and in a tent at the Ssangmun-dong Public Cemetery before settling into an unauthorized shack in Ssangmun-dong. Her husband died of a sudden illness. Lee was a Christian.

== Labor activism ==
Her son Jeon Tae-il worked in a clothing sweatshop in the Pyeonghwa Market and became a labor activist. In 1970 at the age of 22, he self-immolated after police intervened at a protest against poor working conditions, dying the next day. His death sparked nationwide protests. Lee became a labor activist after Jeon Tae-il's death, promising to him on his deathbed to continue his pro-labor activism. On 27 November 1970, two weeks after Jeon Tae-il's death, Lee helped found the Cheonggye Garment Workers' Union with his former coworkers. The union quickly faced repression from government officials, who accused it of being a communist organization. After Jeon Tae-il's death, her children Jeon Tae-sam and Jeon Soon-ok also joined the labor movement. In 1975, the government executed eight people in the People's Revolutionary Party incident and attempted to cremate their bodies; Lee led protests to return the bodies to their families. She was imprisoned in 1977 for her connection with the Democratic Youth League.

On May 4, 1980, Lee participated in protests at the Korea University library in Seongbuk-gu, Seoul, where she promoted the Cheonggye Garment Workers' Union and decried the poor working conditions at Pyeonghwa Market. On May 9, 1980, she held a protest at the Federation of Korean Trade Unions Hall in Yeongdeungpo-gu, where she was arrested and charged with illegal assembly. In January 1981, the government ordered the dissolution of the Cheonggye Garment Workers' Union and closed its office. The union refused to dissolve and Lee, her son Jeon Tae-sam, and numerous other union members were arrested by the military regime of Chun Doo-hwan for violating martial law provisions; Lee was sentenced to 10 months in prison. In August 1986, she helped found the Korean Association of Bereaved Families for Democracy and served as its first president. The Cheonggye Garment Workers' Union was legally recognized in 1987 after during the Roh Tae-woo administration.

Beginning in 1998, she held a sit-in for 422 days in front of the National Assembly calling for investigations into suspicious deaths during South Korea's military rule. She met with president Kim Dae-jung in 1999, criticizing him for not focusing on democratization reform. In December 1999, the Assembly passed a law to create a fact-finding committee. By the time it was disbanded in 2002, it resolved 82 deaths.

At the November 2006 Korean Confederation of Trade Unions National Workers' Rally, she presented the Jeon Tae-il Labor Award and delivered a speech calling for solidarity between regular and irregular workers. In 2008, author Oh Do-yeop published To Those I Can't Thank Enough: Lee So-sun's Memory of 80 Years, a book written during two years of interviews between Lee and Oh.

In 2011, she passed out while traveling to join Hanjin Heavy Industries and Construction workers protesting against layoffs.

Lee was known for wearing a red headband at rallies.

== Death and legacy ==
Lee was hospitalized in July 2011 due to heart issues. She died in Hanil General Hospital in Seoul on September 3, 2011 at the age of 82. A funeral was held at Seoul National University Hospital, with around 500 people in attendance, including actor Hong Kyung-in and politicians Chung Dong-young, Lee Jung-hee, and Roh Hoe-chan. Bae Eun-sim, mother of Lee Han-yeol; Lee Yong-deuk, chairman of the Federation of Korean Trade Unions; and Kim Young-hoon, chairman of the Korean Confederation of Trade Unions, delivered eulogies. In the funeral procession, workers carried banners with slogans such as "Workers are not machines" and "Mother, we love you." Following the funeral service, a memorial service was held at Jeon Tae-il Bridge in Cheonggyecheon, with around 2,000 people in attendance. She was buried in Maseok, Gyeonggi Province alongside Jeon Tae-il's grave.

The Korean Confederation of Trade Unions and Federation of Korean Trade Unions paid their respects to Lee. The Korea Democracy Foundation submitted a petition to the Ministry of Security and Public Administration to honor her but was rejected by the ministry. She is commonly referred to as the "mother of laborers" for her activism.

She was portrayed by Lee Joo-sil in the 1995 film A Single Spark. Directory Tae Joon-sik released Mother, a documentary on Lee's life, in 2012. Lee was voiced by Yeom Hye-ran in the 2021 animated film Chun Tae-il: A Flame That Lives On.

In 2024, Lee was posthumously acquitted for violating martial law provisions in 1981 after a retrial request was filed in 2021.
