= Work–life balance in South Korea =

Average annual hours actually worked per worker in OECD countries from 1970 to 2020

Historically, South Korea's labor practices and legal framework have provided limited support for work-life balance. The emergence of Warabal as a neologism, reflected growing public awareness of work-life balance in South Korea, including changing perceptions of work and worker's basic rights. Two major movements have been rising: one related to laws and the other to people's perceptions.

== Work life-balance in Korea ==
Warabal (워라밸), or work–life balance, is a newly coined Korean term that has emerged promoting to value quality of life rather than annual salary increases. Rather than only getting a high salary from a good company, it is about maintaining a better quality of life through reasonable working hours and adequate compensation. Recently, the so-called "a life with evenings", which is described as "work and life balance", has become a basic human value. Warabal, that is particularly prevalent among younger generations, has both potential benefits and drawbacks. While allowing more time for everyday life, such as family conversations, child care and shared moments, there are more restrictions about professional benefits, such as economic compensation and promotions. Achieving Warabal has also been associated with broader socioeconomic issues, including social welfare and basic income.

== Labor history of South Korea and the recognition of Warabal ==
During the economic development in the 1960s, Korean society shifted from an agricultural society to an industrial one. In the 1970s, export-oriented heavy and chemical industrialization achieved considerable growth. But this was a low wages and long working hours system, centered on labor-intensive industries. The concept of Warabal had not yet emerged in South Korean society, and work-life balance was not widely recognized as a social issue.

Following Jeon Tae-il death in Cheonggye Plaza on November 13, 1970, during a protest in which he called for compliance with the Labor Standards Act and declared "We are not machines", the Peace Market was ordered to comply with the act and the labor protections he had advocated were subsequently implemented . Jeon promoted to reconsider the human rights of workers who were not duly protected by the law. This incident became an important milestone in the development of labor rights in South Korea, which later contributed to broader discussions of work-life balance.

In contemporary South Korea, warabal refers to the allocation of time and energy between work and personal life and has gained attention among office workers. The growing interest in work–life balance has been associated with broader socioeconomic changes, including slower economic growth and increasing job insecurity.

Although working hours have declined substantially, work–life balance remains an ongoing issue in South Korea. According to the OECD, the average usual working week for full-time workers fell by 8.2 hours over the decade to 2022, reaching 43.2 hours.

During the late 2010s, growing interest in warabal was reflected in changes in both workplace practices and leisure activities. A 2017 survey by Statistics Korea examined leisure activities and satisfaction with leisure time. During this period, services aimed at after-work activities, including personal training, language tutoring, and hobby classes, also gained popularity.

These developments coincided with a broader reform of working-time regulations. Beginning in 2018, South Korea progressively reduced the maximum statutory working week from 68 to 52 hours.

In 2023, Korean workers worked an average of 1,872 hours per year, approximately 200 hours more than the OECD average.

== Labor policies and work–life balance ==
Changes in attitudes toward work and family were reflected in Statistics Korea's 2017 Social Survey. The proportion of respondents who prioritized family over work increased from 11.9% in 2015 to 13.9% in 2017, while the proportion who prioritized work declined from 53.7% to 43.1%.

Government policies aimed at reducing working hours have sought to improve work–life balance as well as employment conditions. Beginning in 2018, South Korea progressively reduced the maximum statutory working week from 68 to 52 hours.

Work–life balance policies in South Korea are also closely connected with women's employment and childcare. Career interruptions associated with marriage, childbirth, and childcare continue to affect women's participation in the labor market. In 2024, Statistics Korea reported that 1.215 million married women aged 15 to 54 had experienced career interruptions. Childcare was the most commonly reported reason (41.1%), followed by marriage (24.9%), pregnancy and childbirth (24.4%), family care (4.8%), and children's education (4.7%).

The OECD has identified work–life balance as an important factor affecting both female employment and family formation in South Korea. Policies intended to facilitate the combination of employment and family life include childcare provision, paid parental leave, and flexible working arrangements, although gaps in access and utilization remain.

=== Labor Standards Act ===
The 2018 amendment to the Labor Standards Act introduced a major reform of working-time regulations in South Korea. The maximum statutory working week was reduced from 68 to 52 hours, consisting of 40 regular hours and up to 12 hours of overtime. The reform was introduced progressively according to workplace size, beginning with employers with 300 or more employees in July 2018 and later extending to smaller workplaces.

The reform also introduced other changes to working conditions. Private-sector employers became progressively required to provide paid leave on public holidays, a requirement that was phased in according to workplace size between 2020 and 2022. Workplaces with 5 to 29 employees were temporarily permitted an additional eight hours of weekly overtime, subject to a written agreement with an employee representative.

The working-time reform was intended to reduce the prevalence of very long working hours and bring South Korea's working-time regulations closer to those of other OECD countries.

=== Pregnancy and maternity protections ===
South Korea has introduced several measures intended to help pregnant workers and mothers remain in employment. Pregnant employees within the first 12 weeks or after the 36th week of pregnancy are entitled to reduce their working day by two hours without a reduction in pay. The measure was initially limited to larger employers but was extended to all workplaces in March 2016.

Statutory maternity leave was introduced in South Korea in 1953, initially providing 60 days of paid leave. In November 2001, the entitlement was extended to 90 days, with the additional 30 days financed through employment insurance. As of 2024, eligible mothers were entitled to 90 days of paid maternity leave. For employees of large companies, employers covered the first 60 days, while the remaining 30 days were funded through employment insurance. Different funding arrangements applied to small and medium-sized enterprises.

== See also ==
- Work–life balance in Germany
- Work–life balance in the United States
