= Chun Tae-il: A Flame That Lives On =

2021 South Korean animated film

- Theatrical release poster
- Hangul: 태일이
- RR: Taeiri
- MR: T'aeiri
- Directed by: Byun Young-kyu; Hong Jun-pyo
- Starring: Jang Dong-yoon
- Release date: December 1, 2021
- Running time: 99 minutes
- Country: South Korea
- Language: Korean
- Box office: $809,733 world wide

Chun Tae-il: A Flame That Lives On, also known as Chun Tae-il or in Korean as Taeiri (Korean: 태일이) is a 2021 South Korean animated film about Korean labor activist Jeon Tae-il. The film is directed by Byun Young-kyu and Hong Jun-pyo. It was released in theaters on December 1, 2021.

== Cast ==
- Jang Dong-yoon as Chun Tae-il
- Yeom Hye-ran as Mother, Mrs. Lee So-seon
- Jin Sun-kyu as Father
- Park Chul-min as Tailor Mr. Sin
- Kwon Hae-hyo as Hanmi Corporation president

== Production ==
In November 2020, it was announced that they producing the animation from the based on the real events and Chun will be voiced by Jang Dong-yoon as a 50th anniversary years before his death in 1970, the film will be released on 2021 first in half.

The film was revealed to be released on December 1, 2021.

== Reception ==
The film grossed $809,733 worldwide.

=== Awards and nominations ===
Year	Award	Category	Recipient	Result	Ref
2022	Annecy International Animation Film Festival	Special Award	Chun Tae-il: A Flame That Lives On	Won	
2022	Fantasia International Film Festival	Best Animated Feature Film	Chun Tae-il: A Flame That Lives On	Won	

== See also ==
- South Korean animation
- List of Korean animated films
