= A Single Spark =

- Poster for A Single Spark (1995)
- Hangul: 아름다운 청년 전태일
- Hanja: 아름다운 靑年 전태일
- RR: Areumdaun cheongnyeon Jeon Taeil
- MR: Arŭmdaun ch'ŏngnyŏn Chŏn T'aeil
- Directed by: Park Kwang-su
- Written by: Lee Chang-dong; Kim Jeong-hwan; Yi Hyo-in; Hur Jin-ho; Park Kwang-su
- Produced by: Yoo In-taek
- Starring: Moon Sung-keun; Hong Kyung-in
- Cinematography: You Young-gil
- Edited by: Kim Yang-il
- Music by: Song Hong-seop
- Distributed by: Age of Planning
- Release date: November 13, 1995 (South Korea)
- Running time: 92 minutes
- Country: South Korea
- Language: Korean

A Single Spark (Korean: 아름다운 청년 전태일; lit. 'A Beautiful Youth, Jeon Tae-il') is a 1995 South Korean drama film directed and co-written by Park Kwang-su.

== Plot ==
The film is set in Seoul, South Korea, and is told from two different perspectives in different timelines. In the mid-1970s a law school graduate Kim Yeong-su (Moon Sung-keun) has a history of militant and subversive activities and is subsequently in hiding from the authorities. He has secret meetings with his wife Shin Jeong-soon (Kim Sun-jae), who is pregnant with their first child and is also trying to form a trade union at her place of work. To use his time productively he is working on the biography of Jeon Tae-il (Hong Kyoung-in), a garment worker who committed suicide five years ago to draw attention to abuses of labour rights. Kim Yeong-su has contacted Jeon Tae-il's mother, and travels around the city having clandestine meetings with the activist's friends and former colleagues, interviewing them for material for his book. This timeline is shown in full colour.

In a second timeline, starting in the 1960s and shown in black and white, Jeon Tae-il is selling umbrellas in the street but manages to get a proper job and starts working at a garment factory in The Peace Market in Seoul. This is a street in the city lined with many similar businesses where workers are forced to work long hours, to do unpaid overtime in poor conditions with no holidays or benefits and very low pay. Jeon Tae-il learns about the Labor Standards Act regarding workers rights from his father, and begins to press the business owner on fair treatment for his staff. He also buys cakes for his colleagues who cannot afford to eat properly. When it becomes clear the business owners are not interested in obeying the law he shares his research with other garment workers who were not aware that these laws existed. He convenes a meeting at which he tells them they are fools for subjecting themselves to these abuses and they form an activist group calling themselves The Fool's Association.

Jeon Tae-il compiles a report for the Ministry of Labour, showing how many laws are being broken, and they say they will look into it. Encouraged, he takes responsibility for telling other workers that they may go home and rest, but he is fired and goes to work on a road construction project. The work is just as hard, and the workers are similarly abused and underpaid but he decides that he cannot ignore his colleagues in the garment industry and he leaves the construction crew and goes back to the city to campaign for worker's rights. His former colleagues are happy to see him come back and he submits a formal complaint with the Ministry of Labour concerning their lack of protected rights, but it becomes clear the Ministry are only interested in assisting business owners. Workers are not important.

Eventually, Jeon Tae-il meets a journalist, but the journalist needs facts so Jeon Tae-il interviews other garment workers collecting details of pay, hours worked, lack of sickness benefits and time off, and poor and often dangerous working conditions. The journalist writes an expose in the newspaper that gets the attention of the Ministry of Labour. There is a meeting between the workers, the business owners and the Ministry where many promises are made and it looks as though things are going to improve. The workers organise protests in the street, inspired by the student protests that are also taking place, but as they wait for the business owner to keep their promises to improve conditions. The group are repeatedly rebuffed and they realise that nothing will happen unless they make a big statement. They agree that if the labour laws are not being kept anyway they might as well not exist so they decide to publicly burn a book of the labour laws. As his colleagues prepare for the demonstration where the book burning will take place Jeon Tae-il douses himself with petrol, and as he lights the book of labour laws he sets himself alight and runs through the street shouting "We are not machines."

In the present Kim Yeong-su walks through the Peace Market where the garment businesses were formerly located, and he sees a young man, very like Jeon Tae-il, holding a copy of a book The Life and Death of Jeon Tae-il by Kim Yeong-su.

== Awards ==
- Blue Dragon Film Awards (1995) Won Best Film Award
- 46th Berlin International Film Festival (1996) Nominated for Golden Bear (Park Kwang-su)

== Bibliography ==
- Jeon tae-il (1995) at IMDb
- Kim, Kyung-hyun (2004). "4. Post-Trauma and Historical Remembrance in A Single Spark and A Petal". The Remasculinization of Korean Cinema. Durham and London: Duke University Press. pp. 113–119. ISBN 0-8223-3267-1.
- "A Single Spark(Aleumda-un cheongnyeon Jeon Taeil)(1995)". Korean Movie Database.
- "A Single Spark". Human Rights Watch International Film Festival FilmArchive. Archived from the original on 2007-12-15.
