= Yoo Sun =

South Korean actress (born 1976)

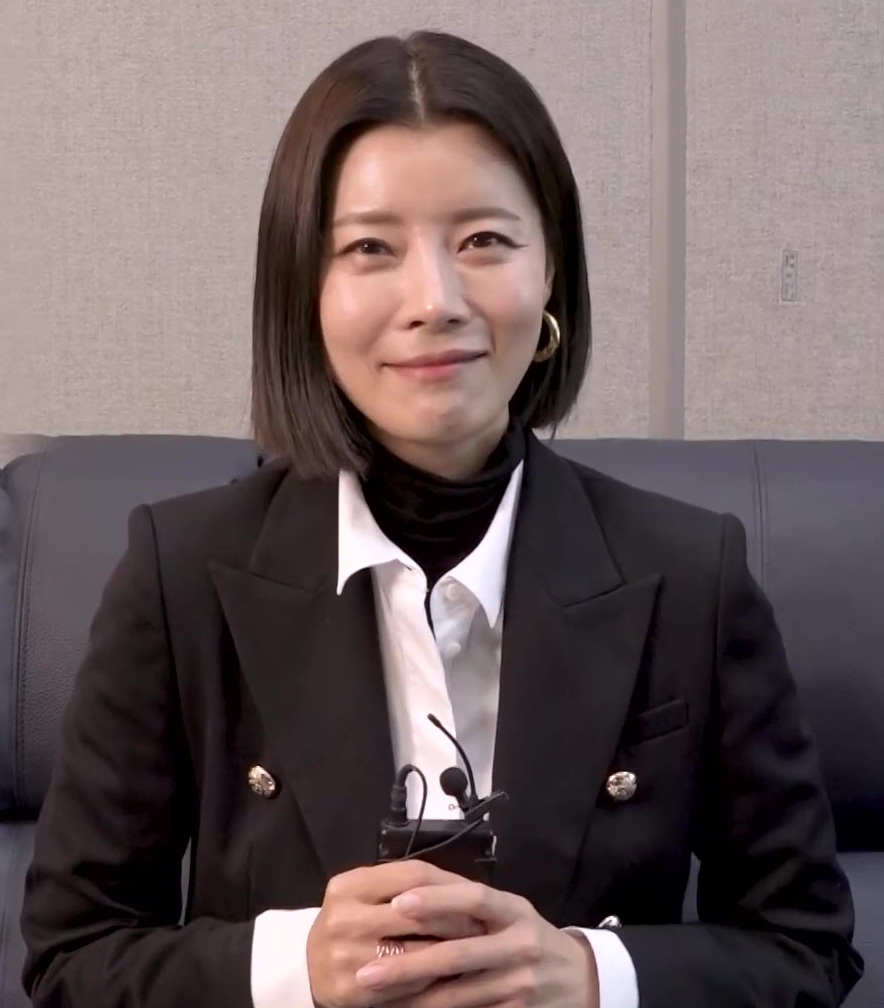
- Yoo in 2022
- Born: Wang Yoo-sun; February 11, 1976 (age 50); Seoul, South Korea
- Education: Korea National University of Arts - Theatre Studies
- Occupation: Actress
- Years active: 1999–present
- Agents: Namoo Actors; Dain Entertainment
- Spouse: Cha Hyo-joo (m. 2011)
- Children: 1

Korean name
- Hangul: 왕유선
- Hanja: 王裕善
- RR: Wang Yuseon
- MR: Wang Yusŏn

Wang Yoo-sun (Korean: 왕유선; born February 11, 1976), known professionally as Yoo Sun, is a South Korean actress. She is best known for the popular family drama My Too Perfect Sons, as well as the films Black House, Moss, GLove, and Don't Cry Mommy.

== Filmography ==
=== Film ===
Year	Title	Role
1999	Mayonnaise	Ara
2000	www.whitelover.com (short film)	Ha-yan
2003	The Uninvited	Hee-eun
2004	The Big Swindle	Jung In-sook
2005	The Wig	Ji-hyeon
2007	Black House	Shin Yi-hwa
2007	Moss	Lee Yeong-ji
2011	GLove	Na Joo-won
2011	Romantic Heaven	Yeom Kyeong-ja
2012	Never Ending Story	Je-soo
2012	Gabi	Sadako
2012	Don't Cry Mommy	Kim Yoo-rim
2015	The Chosen: Forbidden Cave	Geum-joo
2015	Himalaya	Choi Seon-ho (cameo)
2015	Never Said Goodbye	Soo Jung
2017	The Preparation	Moon-kyeong
2019	Real Culprit	
2021	Sweet & Sour	
2022	Good Morning	Seo-jin

=== Television series ===
Year	Title	Role	Notes/Ref.
1999	Hometown of Legends: "Sang-sa-yo"		
2001	MBC Best Theater: "An Incomplete Love"		
2002	The Shining Sunlight	Choi Joon-hee	
2002	The Great Ambition	Dan Ja-yeon	
2003	South of the Sun	Lee Min-joo	
2004	Into the Storm	Yoo Jin-kyung	
2004	Little Women	Jung Mi-deuk	
2005	Sweet Spy	Park Eun-joo	
2006	Singles Game	Han Young-eun	
2007	Lobbyist	Eva	
2007	That Woman Is Scary	Choi Young-rim	
2008	General Hospital 2	Jang Shik-jin	Cameo (episodes 3–4)
2008	Terroir	Ahn Ji-sun	
2009	My Too Perfect Sons	Kim Bok-shil	
2012	Take Care of Us, Captain	Choi Ji-won	
2012	The King's Doctor	Jang In-joo	
2013	Drama Festival: "Surviving in Africa"	Kang Min-joo	
2015	Life Tracker Lee Jae-goo	Song Yeon-hee	
2015	Sweet, Savage Family	Lee Do-kyung	
2016–2017	Our Gap-soon	Shin Jae-soon	
2017	Criminal Minds	Na Na-Hwang	
2018	Clean with Passion for Now	Secretary Gwon	
2019	Mother of Mine	Kang Mi-seon	
2020	Get Revenge	Kim Tae-ohn	
2021	Hush	Yang Yoon-kyung	
2022	Eve	Han So-ra	
2023	Pale Moon	Ryu Ga-eul	
2023	Queen of Masks	Yoon Hae-mi	

=== Web series ===
Year	Title	Role	Notes	Ref.
2021	Move to Heaven	Kang Eun-jeong		

=== Variety/radio shows ===
Year	Title	Notes/Ref.
2001–2002	Movies and Popcorn	Host
2003–2005	Million Dollar Mystery	Host
2009	Photographer	Host
2014	Kim C's Music Show	Special DJ
2015	Real Men: Female Soldier Special - Season 3	Cast member
2022	Earth in the House	Host

== Theatre ==
Year	Title	Role
2000	Moskito	
2000	Going Together	
2008	Come and See Me	
2008	A Puppet Show	
2008	The Shape of Things	Se-kyung

== Awards and nominations ==
Year	Award	Category	Nominated work	Result
2003	SBS Drama Awards	Best Supporting Actress	South of the Sun	Won
2004	41st Grand Bell Awards	Best Supporting Actress	The Uninvited	Nominated
2004	SBS Drama Awards	New Star Award	Little Women	Won
2004	SBS Drama Awards	Excellence Award, Actress in a Serial Drama	Into the Storm	Won
2005	SBS Drama Awards	Special Award in MC category	Million Dollar Mystery	Won
2007	28th Blue Dragon Film Awards	Best Supporting Actress	Black House	Nominated
2007	SBS Drama Awards	Excellence Award, Actress in a Serial Drama	That Woman Is Scary	Won
2008	2nd Korea Drama Awards	Excellence Award, Actress	That Woman Is Scary	Nominated
2009	17th Korean Culture and Entertainment Awards	Excellence Award, Actress in a Drama	My Too Perfect Sons	Won
2009	KBS Drama Awards	Best Couple Award with Lee Pil-mo	My Too Perfect Sons	Won
2009	KBS Drama Awards	Excellence Award, Actress in a Serial Drama	My Too Perfect Sons	Won
2010	5th Asia Model Festival Awards	BBF Popular Star Award	—N/a	Won
2010	31st Blue Dragon Film Awards	Best Supporting Actress	Moss	Nominated
2011	32nd Blue Dragon Film Awards	Best Supporting Actress	GLove	Nominated
2012	SBS Drama Awards	Excellence Award, Actress in a Drama Special	Take Care of Us, Captain	Nominated
2012	MBC Drama Awards	Top Excellence Award, Actress in a Special Project Drama	The King's Doctor	Nominated
2022	8th APAN Star Awards	Excellence Award, Actress in a Miniseries	Eve	Won
