= Jungnangcheon =

River in South Korea

Coordinates: 37°33′N 127°02′E

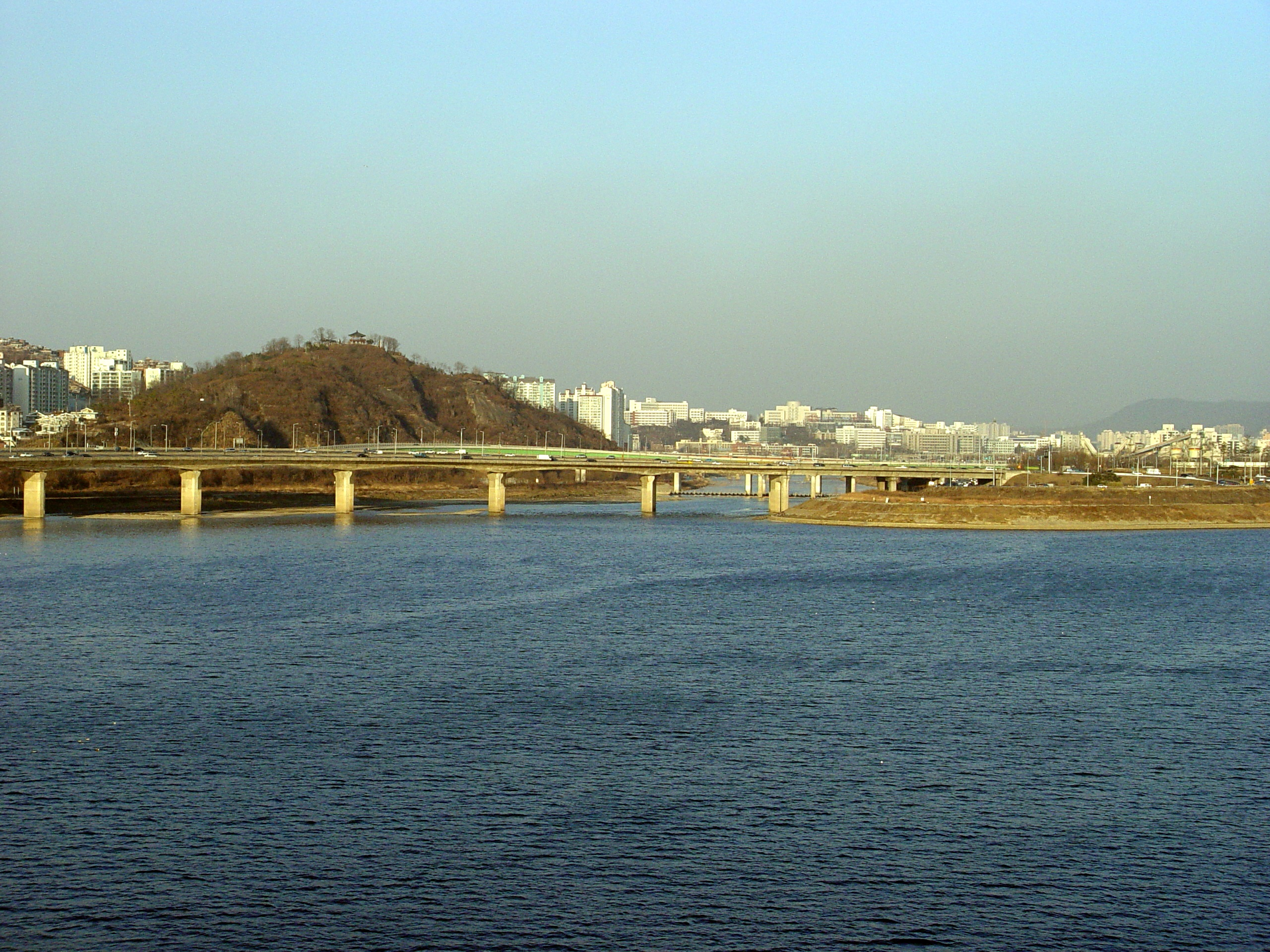
- The Jungnangcheon entering the River Han.

Location
- Country: South Korea
- Provinces: Gyeonggi Province, Seoul

Physical characteristics
- Source: Bulgok Mountain
  - location: Yangju, Gyeonggi Province
- Mouth: Han River
  - location: Seongdong, Seoul
- Length: 36.44 km (22.64 mi)
- Basin size: 296.87 km^{2} (114.62 sq mi)

Basin features
- Tributaries
  - left: Cheonggyecheon

Korean name
- Hangul: 중랑천
- Hanja: 中浪川
- RR: Jungnangcheon
- MR: Chungnangch'ŏn

The Jungnangcheon (Korean: 중랑천) is a tributary of the Han River in South Korea. It is generated in the valley of Dorak Mountain of Yangju, Gyeonggi Province. Cheonggyecheon is a tributary of Jungnangcheon. Its whole river basin extends to 299.9 km^{2}. Most of the stream is located in Uijeongbu and Seoul.

== Recreation ==
Citizens enjoy jogging and cycling near the river. The cycling track links to other tracks on both the nearby Cheongyecheon stream and the Han river.

Seoul Selection reports that there are some areas alongside the stream where rape flowers are visible in May.

== Pollution ==
The river contains a large amount of pollutants especially from domestic pollution. Experts have pointed out that the pollution originates from the upper reaches of the stream. In summer 2007, more than 200 fish died after a heavy rain. Pollutants at the bottom of the riverbed contaminated the stream after a storm, and citizens called environmental authorities.

Uijeongbu city government reported its plan to build more ecologically-friendly sewage disposal plants.

Despite the likelihood that the water is not clean, many people fish in the river downstream from Uijeongbu.

== See also ==
- Rivers of Korea
