= Glove (film) =

- Theatrical release poster
- Hangul: 글러브
- RR: Geulleobeu
- MR: Kŭllŏbŭ
- Directed by: Kang Woo-suk
- Written by: Kim Kee-bum
- Produced by: Katharine Kim; Jung Sun-young
- Starring: Jung Jae-young; Yoo Sun; Kang Shin-il; Cho Jin-woong; Kim Hye-seong; Jang Ki-bum; Lee Hyun-woo
- Cinematography: Kim Yong-heung; Lee Bong-joo
- Edited by: Ko Im-pyo
- Music by: Jo Yeong-wook
- Distributed by: CJ Entertainment
- Release date: January 20, 2011 (South Korea)
- Running time: 144 minutes
- Country: South Korea
- Language: Korean
- Box office: US$12.6 million

Glove (Korean: 글러브) is a 2011 South Korean sports drama film directed by Kang Woo-suk based on a true story. The film stars Jung Jae-young as Sang-nam, a fading baseball star who is forced to coach kids at a school for the deaf and hard of hearing after a drunken fiasco. The film was released to South Korean cinemas on January 20 and went on to receive 1,890,406 admissions nationwide during its run in theaters.

== Plot ==
Kim Sang-nam (Jung Jae-young), a hot-tempered professional baseball player, is sent to the countryside to coach a team of deaf and hard of hearing players in order to avoid media coverage of his recent involvement in an assault case. At first, Sang-nam has a difficult time imagining how he can teach baseball to a group of boys who can't hear, but as he spends time with them he starts to believe that they can play the game. Motivated, Sang-nam decides to help them prepare for the nationals. As Sang-nam trains them, he forms bonds with the players, as well as with the music teacher and baseball manager Ms. Na (Yoo Sun). But things don't go the way Kim plans and their difficulties communicating with one another exacerbates the situation.

== Cast ==
- Jung Jae-young as Kim Sang-nam
- Yoo Sun as Na Joo-won
- Kang Shin-il as Vice Principal
- Cho Jin-woong as Charles
- Kim Hye-seong as Jang Dae-geun
- Jang Ki-bum as Cha Myeong-jae
- Lee Hyun-woo as Kim Jin-man
- Kwon Eun-soo as Sang-mi
- Kim Mi-kyung as nun principal
- Kim Dong-yeong as Jo Jang-hyeok
- Ji Il-joo as Oh Cheol-jin
- Jo Chan-hyeong as Lee Cheol-seung
- Jeong Gyoo-soo as police chief at police sub-station
- Jeon Kook-hwan as group leader Goo
- Jo Kyeong-sook as Myeong-jae's mother
- Lee Hae-yeong as professional baseball player
- Oh Hee-joon as Bully
- Jin Kyung as Nun teacher
