= Jeon Soon-ok =

South Korean politician (born 1954)

Jeon Soon-ok (Korean: 전순옥; born 1954) is a South Korean politician, educator, activist and writer. Her name also appears as Chun Soonok.

The daughter of Yi So-sun, a labor activist, she began working in the textile industry as a machinist's assistant in 1971 at the age of sixteen. The previous year, her brother Jeon Tae-il had died after setting himself on fire to protest working conditions for female workers in the country's textile and garment industry. Eight years later, she joined the labor movement. Jeon studied labor and social studies at Ruskin College in Oxford and went on to earn a master's degree in industrial relations and a PhD in the sociology of labor studies from the University of Warwick. She became a research assistant at Sungkonghoe University. Jeon also launched a non-profit organization which supports female workers.

In 2003, she published They are not Machines: Korean Women Workers and Their Fight for Democratic Trade Unionism in the 1970s. The words "They are not machines" are taken from her brother's dying words.

In 2012, she was elected to the South Korean National Assembly as a member of the opposition New Politics Alliance for Democracy.
