= Jang Ki-bum =

South Korean actor

- Born: May 22, 1990 (age 36); South Korea
- Education: Dankook University - Theater and Film
- Occupation: Actor
- Years active: 2002–2011

Korean name
- Hangul: 장기범
- RR: Jang Gibeom
- MR: Chang Kibŏm

Jang Ki-bum (born May 22, 1990) is a South Korean actor.

== Filmography ==
=== Film ===
Year	Title	Role
2005	Diary of June	Nobleman
2009	The Righteous Thief	Hong Chan-hyeok
2011	Glove	Cha Myeong-jae

=== Television series ===
Year	Title	Role	Network
2002	Zoo People		KBS2
2003	Beautiful May	Kang Woo-hyun	EBS
2003	Devil's Temptation		EBS
2003	The Bicycle Thief		EBS
2003	Girls' Summer Vacation		EBS
2003	Curse of the Mask	Hwang Jin-wook	EBS
2004	Kkangsooni	Min Joon-hee	EBS
2004	There's Light at the Tip of My Fingernail		EBS
2004	The Age of Heroes		MBC
2006	Love and Ambition		SBS
2006	Jump 2		EBS
2006	Secret Campus	Jang Ki-bum	EBS
2007	My Husband's Woman	Heo Joon-goo	SBS
2008	Jungle Fish	Han Dong-hee	KBS2

=== Music video appearances ===
Year	Song title	Artist
2008	"Oh Heart, Please"	Yuri

== Awards and nominations ==
Year	Award	Category	Nominated work	Result
2011	48th Grand Bell Awards	Best New Actor	GLove	Nominated
