= Jeon Tae-il =

South Korean labor activist (1948–1970)

- Born: 28 September 1948; Daegu, South Korea
- Died: 13 November 1970 (aged 22); Dongdaemun District, Seoul, South Korea

Korean name
- Hangul: 전태일
- Hanja: 全泰壹
- RR: Jeon Taeil
- MR: Chŏn T'aeil

Jeon Tae-il (Korean: 전태일; 28 September 1948 – 13 November 1970) was a South Korean sewing worker and workers' rights activist who committed suicide by self-immolation at the age of 22 in protest of the poor working conditions of South Korean factories during the Third Republic era. His death brought attention to the country's substandard labor conditions and advanced the formation of a labor union movement in South Korea.

== Early life ==
Jeon Tae-il was born on 28 September 1948. He was the son of Jeon Sang-soo, a poor sewing worker from Namsan-dong, Daegu, and his wife, Lee So-sun. At one time, his father tried his hand at the domestic water industry, but failed repeatedly. His maternal grandfather was killed by a Japanese police officer on charges of joining the anti-Japanese independence movement. In 1954, he and his family members moved to Seoul, but were homeless under the Yeomcheon Bridge near Seoul Station. Jeon's mother begged in Manni-dong while his father worked, together making enough for the family to live in a monthly rental room.

However, the family returned to Daegu in 1960. Jeon did not finish elementary school and had an underprivileged childhood with little formal education; he began peddling on the street to survive. In March 1963, he entered Cheong-ok High School in Daegu, but his father forced him to drop out to do sewing work at home. Frustrated that he could not attend school, he ran away from home but returned within three days. His father repeatedly kicked and beat him afterwards.

Jeon learned to sew from his father, but he ran away from home again with his younger brother in 1964 and went to Seoul. He peddled at Dongdaemun Market, delivered newspapers, and did other menial work such as shoe polishing. He was later employed as an assistant at the clothing store of Seoul Peace Market (서울평화시장; Seoul Pyeonghwa Sijang). He worked for 14 hours everyday and earned a daily wage of 50 won and a cup of tea. When he turned 17, he became a sida ("chore" in Korean) at Sam-il sa in the Peace Market and soon became a tailor.

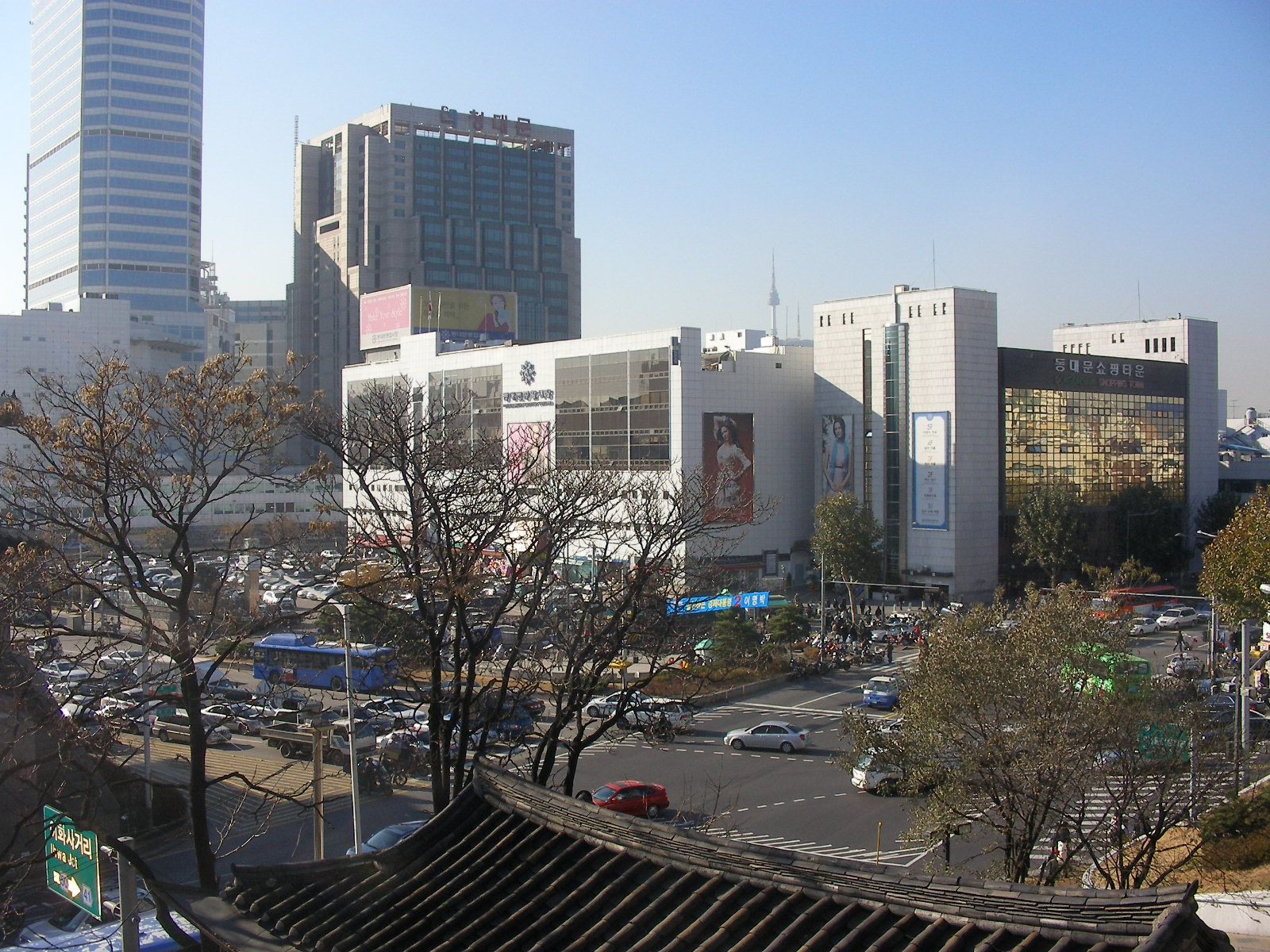
Dongdaemun Market

== Labor activism ==
As a tailor, Jeon witnessed the horrendous working conditions in the Peace Market. Such conditions included rampant tuberculosis due to poor ventilation (or the lack thereof) in the sweatshops, and the forced consumption of pep pills or injections to keep them awake.

In 1968, Jeon became aware of the Labor Standards Act which protected workers' human rights. He purchased a guidebook of the act and began studying it. While studying the contents of the act, he grew angry at the reality that even the minimum working conditions prescribed by law were not observed. In June 1969, he founded the Fool's Association (바보회), the first labor organization in the Peace Market. The name "Fool's Association" reflected Jeon's belief that workers were fools to conform to an exploitative working environment. He informed the workers of the Peace Market of the contents of the act and the unfairness of their current working conditions. He also surveyed the Peace Market's current working conditions through a questionnaire. Jeon was fired from his job at the Peace Market for his labor activism after distributing questionnaires.

Protesting against the actual working conditions in South Korea was by association, protesting against the rule of Park Chung Hee, South Korea's then dictator-president. Although Jeon succeeded in briefly creating awareness, he was soon met with resistance from the government, which ignored labor regulations and frequently sided with employers who were accused of exploitation. Scornful Labor Department officials told Jeon and his colleagues they were unpatriotic for complaining, and their employers simply cracked down harder.

== Death ==
On 13 November 1970, Jeon and around 500 employees from Peace, Donghwa, and Tongil markets staged a sit-in demanding better working conditions. After police and market security guards began breaking up the protest, Jeon set himself on fire and ran through the streets of downtown Seoul shouting slogans such as "We workers are human beings too!", "Guarantee the three basic labor rights!", and "Do not let my death be in vain!"

Jeon received emergency treatment, but his body was unable to stretch out because it had been hardened by the burns. Jeon's mother took off her apron to cover her shivering son, who left her a testament: "Mother, please do something I could not do." Doctors told Jeon's mother that the injection to relieve her son's burns would cost 15,000 won, but she replied that she could not pay that amount. At around 4 pm, Jeon was taken away by ambulance and sent to the emergency room of St. Mary's Hospital in Seoul, where he died at 10 pm on 13 November. His last words, spoken to his mother, were "Mom, I'm hungry".

== Immediate reactions ==
Jeon's suicide prompted the formation of several labor unions, including the Clothing Workers' Union in the Peace Market.

The boss of a company in the Peace Market said he was worried about being investigated because of Jeon's death. The boss later said, "If Jeon Tae-il had worked at our factory, it would have been a really big problem." Some workers were cynical about Jeon's death, commenting that it "would not make any changes to workers' rights". At that time, some workers who did not receive a proper education did not care about Jeon's death.

Labor Office head Lee Seung-taek visited Jeon's family and ordered the three markets to provide Sunday holidays, wage increases, an eight-hour workday, and overtime pay for the 27,000 tailors employed there.

Jeon's death had a large social impact. On 16 November, more than 100 law students at Seoul National University claimed to have received his body and performed a funeral. Nationally, more than 400 students began indefinite fasting protests. On 20 November, students from universities such as Seoul National University, Sungkyunkwan University, and Ewha Women's University gathered at Seoul National University Law School to hold a memorial ceremony for Jeon, as well as a protest. Korea University and Yonsei University students also participated in the rally. After the protests, Seoul National University issued an indefinite suspension of operations, but Seoul National University students continued to engage in vigils.

On 22 November, about 40 university students at Saemoonan Church held a fasting prayer for the Atonement, saying that society was responsible for the death of Jeon and that they are also co-conspirators. On 23 November, Protestant and Catholic Christians jointly held a memorial service for Jeon.

Kim Dae-jung, a presidential candidate of the New Democratic Party, pledged at a press conference on 23 January 1971 that as president he would "implement the spirit of Jeon Tae-il".

== Family ==
The 2012 documentary film Mother tells the story of Jeon's mother, Lee So-sun. Jeon's mother Lee So-sun has been called the "mother of workers" for her devotion to the Cheonggyecheon union and South Korea's labor movement until her death.

In April 2012, his younger sister Jeon Soon-ok was elected to the National Assembly as a member of the Democratic United Party.

== Legacy and memorials ==
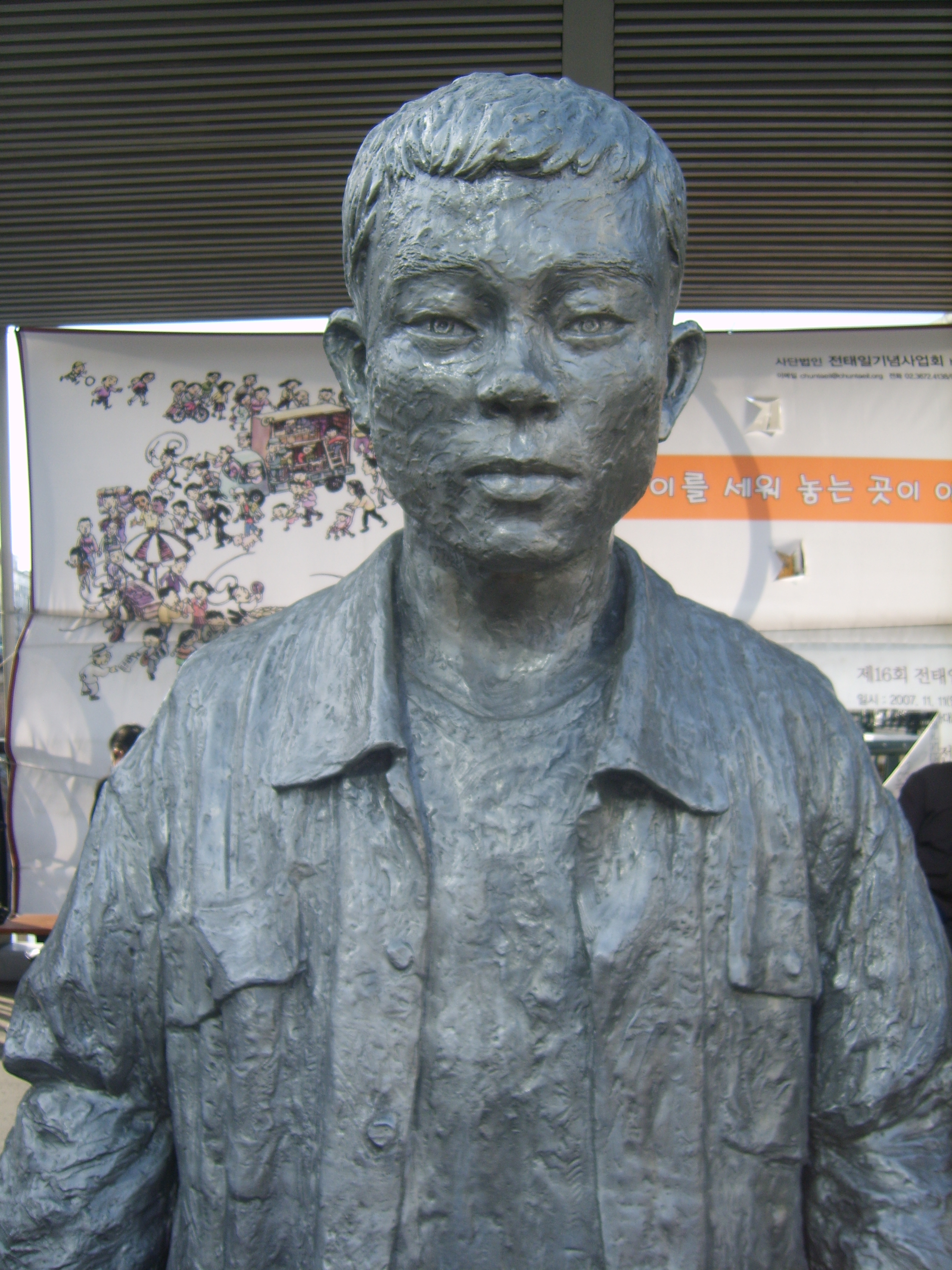
Statue honoring Jeon in Cheonggyecheon

Jeon's death mobilized and motivated workers to take up the struggle of workers' rights, and this eventually led to the creation of labor unions in South Korea. His death also became a catalyst for uniting many university students, some religious officials, and the news media, which continuously silenced their support for the cause of the workers.

The biographic film A Single Spark details Jeon's struggle. A bestselling biography of him was published in 2001.

In 1984, the Jeon Tae-il Commemorative Project was organized in Seoul, centered around labor activists. In 1985, the Jeon Tae-il Memorial Hall was opened. Afterwards, the Jeon Tae-il Foundation was organized to start awarding the Jeon Tae-il Literary Award and the Jeon Tae-il Labor Award.

After the June Struggle in 1987, labor groups gathered and held workers' meetings from July to August of that year. On 15 July, the 1987 Declaration of the Liberation of the Working Class was held in reference to Jeon's commentary.

In November 1988, a national workers' meeting was held in Seoul to commemorate Jeon's self-immolation, and it has been held every November since.

In 2001, Jeon was recognized by the government as a member of the democratization movement. On 19 September 1996, Jeon Tae-il Street was created in Euljiro 6-ga, Jung District, Seoul. In commemoration of this, a memorial performance was held in front of a painting containing the image of Jeon's self-immolation.

On 14 October 2020, "Jeon Tae-il Memorial Month" was proclaimed at a ceremony on Jeon Tae-il Bridge in Jongno District, Seoul, held about a month ahead of the 50th anniversary of Jeon's death. During the ceremony, digital media artist Hooranky Bae unveiled a digital artwork with a motif of Jeon Tae-il, alongside the Jeon Tae-il 50th Anniversary Event Committee. In an interview with Yonhap News, Bae said: "[Jeon] left a great impression. He's a martyr who went beyond human limits."

On 12 November 2020, the South Korean government honored the 50th anniversary of Jeon Tae-il's death, commemorating his sacrifice and expressing its commitment toward a labor-respecting society by posthumously awarding the Mugungwha Medal of the Order of Civil Merit for the first time in the category of labor.

In the 2021 South Korean animated film Chun Tae-il: A Flame That Lives On, directed by Byun Young-kyu and Hong Jun-pyo, Jeon Tae-il is portrayed by Jang Dong-yoon. The film won both the Annecy International Animation Film Festival and Fantasia International Film Festival.

== In popular culture ==
Jeon's statue was prominently featured in the 2025 MBC supernatural action-comedy Oh My Ghost Clients as a poignant symbol that bridged the drama’s supernatural themes with the real-world labour struggles in South Korea. In a key moment, the protagonist a labour rights lawyer leaves a business card at the foot of the statue, symbolically reaching out to the spirit world while also acknowledging the historical sacrifices made in the fight for labour justice. While not explicitly named so in the series, the character "Bo Sal" (played by Tang Jun-sang) is based on Jeon.
