= The Uninvited (2003 film) =

South Korean horror film

- Theatrical release poster
- Hangul: 4인용 식탁
- Hanja: 4人用 食卓
- RR: 4inyong siktak
- MR: 4inyong sikt'ak
- Directed by: Lee Soo-yeon
- Written by: Lee Soo-yeon
- Produced by: Oh Jung-wan; Jeong Hoon-tak
- Starring: Park Shin-yang; Jun Ji-hyun
- Cinematography: Jo Yong-gyu
- Edited by: Kyung Min-ho
- Music by: Jang Young-gyu
- Distributed by: CJ Entertainment
- Release date: August 8, 2003
- Running time: 125 minutes
- Country: South Korea
- Language: Korean
- Budget: $3 million

The Uninvited, also known as A Table for Four, is a 2003 South Korean psychological horror film directed by Lee Soo-yeon. It follows Kang Jung-won (Park Shin-yang), an interior designer who begins seeing ghosts and teams up with narcoleptic Jung-yeon (Jun Ji-hyun) to uncover the reason behind their shared ability. The film was released on August 8, 2003.

== Plot ==
Kang Jung-won (Park Shin-yang), an interior decorator, is overcome with inexplicable anxiety as his long-overdue wedding with Hee-eun (Yoo Sun) approaches. One evening, Jung-won falls asleep on the subway on his way home. He is barely able to wake up at the last station. As he comes round, he sees two young girls asleep on the seat next to him. He cannot wake them before he has to jump off as the train leaves the station. He arrives home to find that his wife-to-be has bought them a new metal dining table.

The next day, Jung-won is working when he hears on the radio that two young girls were found poisoned on the subway. In the course of fitting some lights in a ceiling, he is hit by falling debris and cuts his forehead. After a trip to the hospital for some stitches, he goes home to find the two dead girls seated at his new dining table.

Jung-won, who is now working on renovating a psychiatrist's office, bumps into Jung Yeon (Jun Ji-hyun), a patient on her way out of a therapy session. She has been receiving treatment after her friend, Moon Jung-sook (Kim Yeo-jin), killed both of their children a year earlier. Yeon has been going to all of Jung-sook’s trials and suffering. Another accident leads to Jung-won taking Yeon back to his apartment where she too sees the apparition of the dead children.

Having been tormented by nightmares and the hallucinations, Jung-won is desperate to find out something about the apparitions that haunt him. Yeon runs away refusing to help him, so he searches through the patients' records at the clinic to find out more about her. Using the information he succeeds in persuading her to help him uncover his past. Jung-won discovers that he had killed his father and sister.

When Jung-won was a child, he had witnessed an accident of a young boy, and saw him being left inside a manhole. When the townspeople were searching for him, he told them the boy had been left inside the manhole, leading Jung-won's father to believe that Jung-won had shamanic abilities. His father set up a shaman business, but as Jung-won couldn't properly perform, his father would beat him every day. In order to escape, Jung-won decides to die of carbon monoxide poisoning with his father, but thought to spare his younger sister by placing her in a cabinet in a different room. A fire starts, but his younger sister is killed because she had been hidden from sight, and was not rescued in time. Rather than shaman abilities, it is his trauma and guilt that has caused him to see the children at his kitchen table. In additional flashbacks, we now see it is actually Yeon who has shamanistic abilities. She seeks that Jung-sook, has had childhood trauma that has led to Jung-sook fearing children. She also has get flashes of people's memories and traumas that cause her to collapse frequently. Rather than believing her, her husband and her mother-in-law grow increasingly suspicious of Yeon's erratic behavior.

Unfortunately, Jung-won suffers the consequences rediscovering his past. His fiancée Hee-eun suspects that he is having an affair and leaves him. Jung-sook found innocent of the murder of Yeon's child, but shown mentally insane, and committed to an asylum. Yeon and her husband look from afar as the police take Jung-sook away. Jung-sook suddenly commits suicide as she is leaving the courthouse. Shocked, Yeon calls Jung-won who comes over to console her. He talks to her husband, Park Moon-sub (Park Won-sang), who suspects that it was his wife, not her dead friend, who killed their children.

Jung-won, caught up in his desire to deny his past and his fear of Yeon, turns down Yeon's cry for help when her husband tries to have her committed to a mental hospital. His refusal crushes Yeon, who throws herself off Jung-won's apartment building. Jung-won sees her as she falls. In the final scene, Jung-won sits in his dust-covered apartment. Face lined like an old man, he brings a steaming dish of food to the dining table and sits down. His dining table is full, not with the family he had been planning but the apparitions of the two poisoned girls on the subway and Yeon.

== Cast ==
- Park Shin-yang as Jeong-won
- Jun Ji-hyun as Jeongyeon (Yeon)
- Yoo Sun as Hee-eun
- Park Won-sang as Park moon-seop
- Kim Yeo-jin as Moon Jeong-sook
- Ju-shil Lee as Mrs. Song
- Ki-hwa Kang as Kang Yeong-seo
- Jeong Wook as Minister Kang
- Lee Seok-jun as Chang-hyeong

== Release ==
The Uninvited was released in South Korea on August 8, 2003. In the Philippines, the film was released on April 10, 2004.

=== Critical reception ===
Reception to the film was mixed. Koreanfilm.org called it a "striking film driven by a strong vision" but sometimes it felt "like a flawed work."
