= Black House (film) =

- Korean theatrical poster
- Hangul: 검은 집
- RR: Geomeun jip
- MR: Kŏmŭn chip
- Directed by: Shin Tae-ra
- Written by: Lee Yeong-jong; Ahn Jae-hoon; Kim Seong-ho
- Based on: The Black House by Yusuke Kishi
- Produced by: Kim Bong-seo; Choi Joon-hwan; Yoo Il-han
- Starring: Hwang Jung-min; Yoo Sun; Kang Shin-il
- Cinematography: Choi Joo-yeong
- Edited by: Nam Na-yeong
- Music by: Choi Seung-hyun
- Production company: CJ Entertainment
- Distributed by: CJ Entertainment
- Release date: June 21, 2007
- Running time: 104 minutes
- Country: South Korea
- Language: Korean
- Box office: $9.5 million

Black House (Korean: 검은 집) is a 2007 South Korean horror film directed by Shin Tae-ra, that is based on the popular Japanese novel of the same title (called Kuroi Ie) by Yusuke Kishi. A Japanese film adaptation of the novel was released in 1999. The story centers on an insurance investigator that suspects a family murdered their son to receive his insurance policy.

== Plot ==
During his first day as an insurance investigator, Jeon Joon-oh, receives a phone call from a lady enquiring if a life insurance policy could be collected if someone commits suicide. A few days later Joon-oh is asked to personally come to the home of an insurance policy holder.

When Joon-oh arrives at their home he is greeted by a grim man. They talk for a little while, before the father asks the insurance agent to go into their son's room and have a talk with him. When the insurance agent opens the son's door he finds the boy hanging from a noose, dead from an apparent suicide.

The father then shows up at Joon-oh's office and asks for the money pertaining to his son's life insurance policy. Joon-oh is suspicious of the man and tells him he has to wait until the coroner's report comes in. The man becomes furious and then leaves. The father returns the next day and the next day and the next day. Finally Joon-oh's boss decides to pay the man his son's life insurance policy. Joon-oh's life doesn't return to normal and in fact descends further downward because of a stalker that may well be the insurance policy holder that they just paid off.

== Cast ==
- Hwang Jung-min as Jeon Joon-oh, an insurance investigator
- Yoo Sun as Shin Yi-hwa
- Kang Shin-il as Park Choong-bae
- Kim Seo-hyung as Jang Mi-na
- Kim Jeong-seok as Chief Nam
- Yoo Seung-mok as Ma Yong-sik
- Jung In-gi as police detective Oh
- Kim Young-sun as Hong-yeon's mother
- Moon Ga-young

== See also ==
- List of South Korean films of 2007
