= Seoul Peace Market =

Market in Seoul, South Korea

Seoul Peace Market (Korean: 서울평화시장; RR: Seoul pyeonghwa sijang) was an area in Cheonggyecheon area in Seoul, South Korea.

In 1960s and 1970s it was known as a site of numerous sweatshops, criticized for poor working conditions. On November 13, 1970, Jeon Tae-il, a Korean worker and workers' rights activist, committed suicide by burning himself to death at that location in protest of the poor working conditions in then South Korean factories.

By early 1990s most industry has relocated from that area, and it became well known as a quality marketplace, particularly for garments, attracting not just locals but even international tourists.
