= Labor Standards Act (South Korea) =

- Hangul: 근로기준법
- Hanja: 勤勞基準法
- RR: Geullo gijunbeop
- MR: Kŭllo kijunpŏp

Labor Standards Act (Korean: 근로기준법) is a Labour law in South Korea since 1953.

== See also ==
- Jeon Tae-il
