= Cheonggyecheon =

River in downtown Seoul, South Korea

Coordinates: 37°34′12″N 127°0′23″E

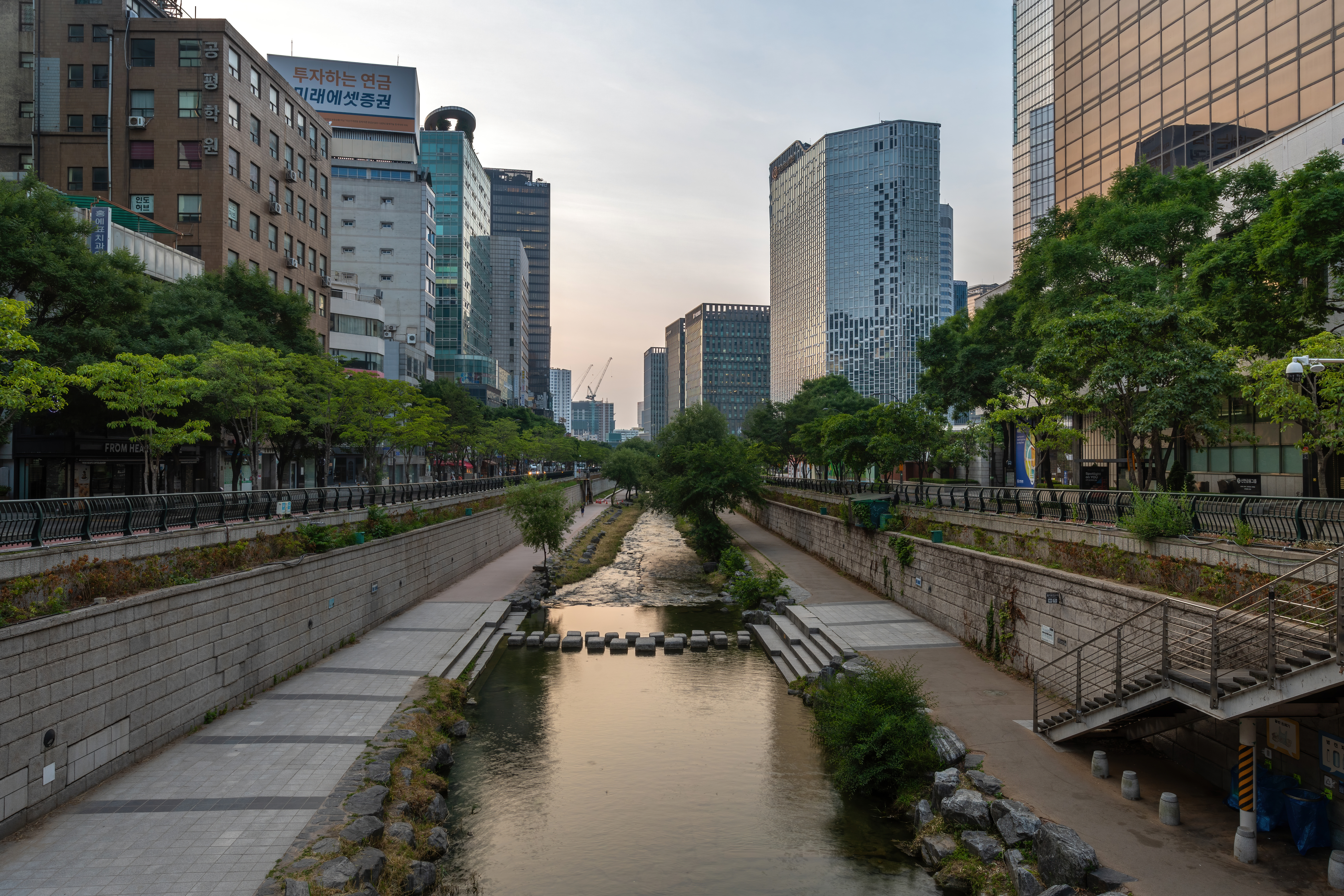
- Cheonggyecheon at sunrise

Location
- Country: South Korea
- Provinces: Seoul

Physical characteristics
- Source: Suseongdong Valley in Inwangsan
  - location: Ogin, Jongno, Seoul
- Mouth: Jungnangcheon
  - location: Yongdap, Seongdong, Seoul
- Length: 10.92 km (6.79 mi)
- Basin size: 50.96 km^{2} (19.68 sq mi)

Basin features
- Tributaries
  - left: Seongbukcheon, Jeongneungcheon

Historic Sites of South Korea
- Designated: 2005-03-25
- Part of: Historic Sites of Cheonggyecheon Stream, Seoul
- Reference no.: 461

Korean name
- Hangul: 청계천
- Hanja: 淸溪川
- RR: Cheonggyecheon
- MR: Ch'ŏnggyech'ŏn

Cheonggyecheon (Korean: 청계천; Korean pronunciation: [t͡ɕʰʌŋ.ɡje.t͡ɕʰʌn]) is a 10.9-kilometre-long (6.8 mi) stream and public space in downtown Seoul, South Korea. A natural stream sourced from the Suseongdong Valley in Inwangsan, it was historically maintained as part of Seoul's early sewerage until the mid-20th century, when post-Korean War rapid economic development and deteriorating conditions prompted the filling of the stream with concrete and the construction of an elevated freeway, the Cheonggye Expressway, in its place. In 2003, the city government began an urban renewal project to remove the expressway and restore the stream, which was completed in 2005 at a cost of over ₩386 billion (approximately US$281 million).

The Cheonggyecheon restoration project initially attracted significant public criticism, but since its opening in 2005 it has become popular among residents and tourists.

== Geography ==
Cheonggyecheon is an 10.84 km (6.74 mi) stream flowing west to east through downtown Seoul, and then meeting Jungnangcheon, which connects to the Han River and empties into the Yellow Sea.

== History ==
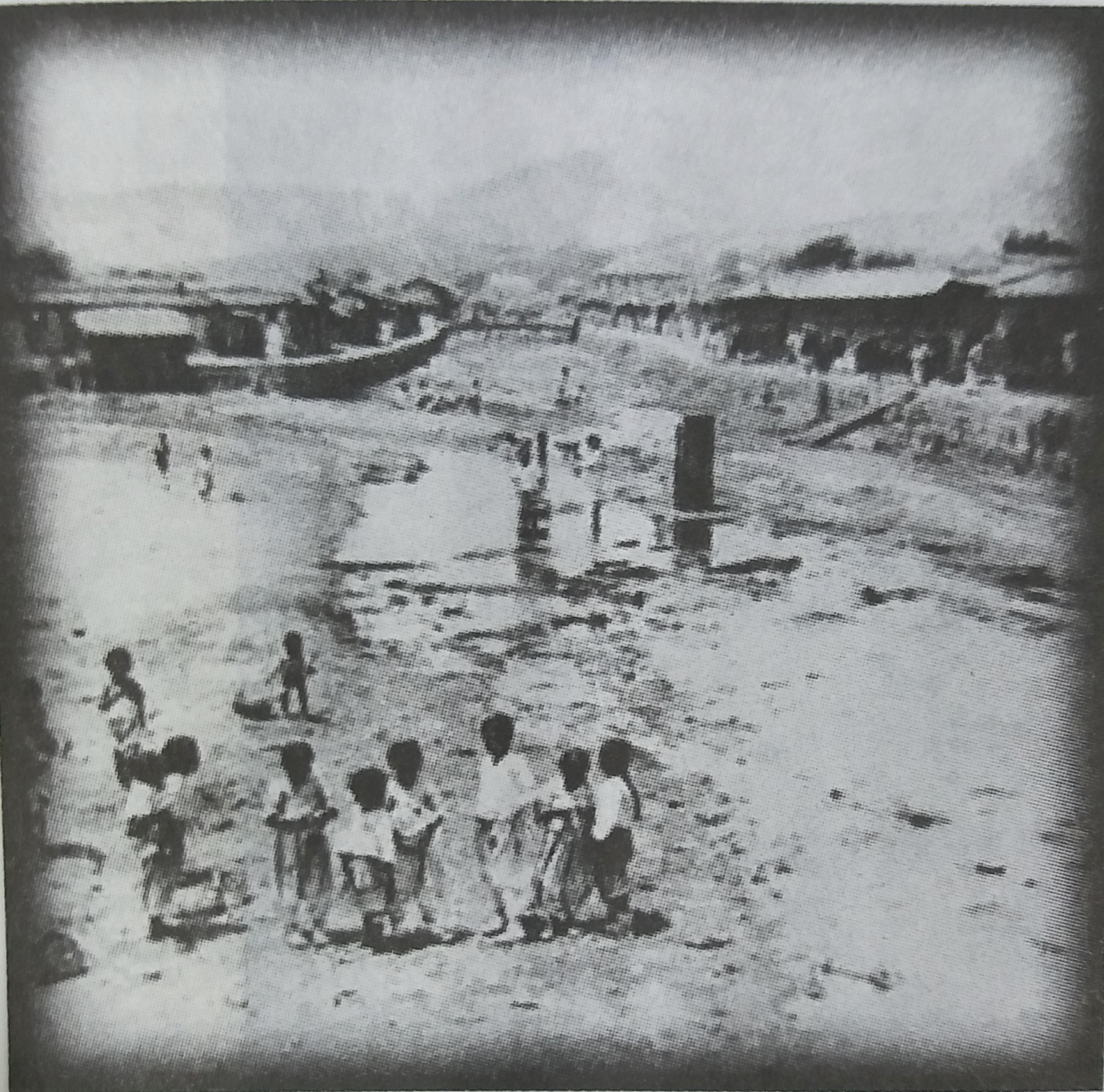
Cheonggyecheon in 1904

The stream was named as Gaecheon ("open stream") after the first refurbishment project to construct a drainage system during the Joseon period. The work, which included dredging and bolstering the banks of the stream and building bridges, was carried out every 2–3 years during this period from the reign of Taejong, the third king of Joseon. King Yeongjo especially undertook the refurbishment work as a national project.

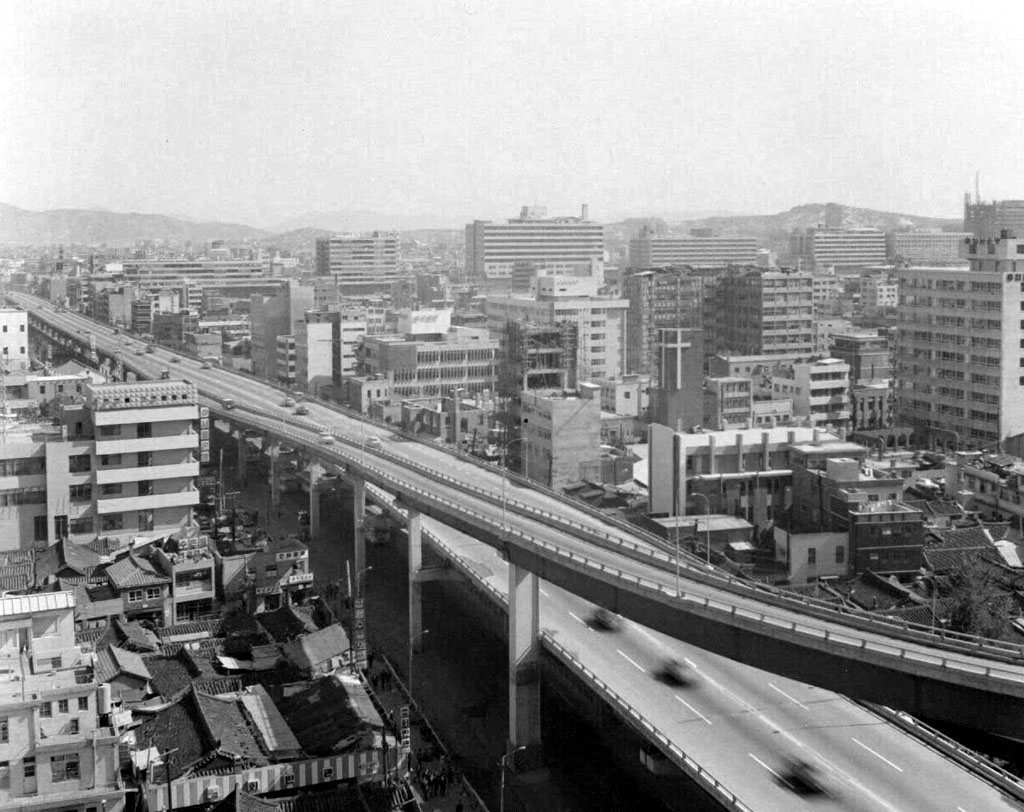
The Cheonggye elevated highway in September 1969

Gaecheon was renamed to Cheonggyecheon, its current name, when Korea was under Japanese rule. During this time, financial difficulties disrupted and prevented Japanese forces from covering up the stream despite several attempts to do so.

Beginning in 1406, King Taejong expanded the natural stream by dredging its bed and constructing embankments along both sides. However, damage caused by heavy rainfall continued. In December 1411, the Joseon government established a temporary office called Gaecheondogam to oversee maintenance and improvement work on the stream.

By the mid-1950s, the Cheonggyecheon area had become one of the most representative slum districts in Seoul after the Korean War. To address this problem, the Cheonggyecheon covering project was promoted.

Although parts of the stream had been covered during the Japanese colonial period and in 1955, large-scale covering of Cheonggyecheon began in 1958.

After the Korean War, more people migrated into Seoul to make their living and settled down along the stream in shabby makeshift houses. The accompanying trash, sand, and waste, and deteriorating conditions resulted in an eyesore for the city. The stream was covered up with concrete over 20 years starting in 1958, and a 5.6 km-long (3.5 mi), 16 m-wide (52 ft) elevated highway was opened in stages between March 1969 and July 1976. The area became an example of successful industrialization and modernization of South Korea.

== Restoration ==
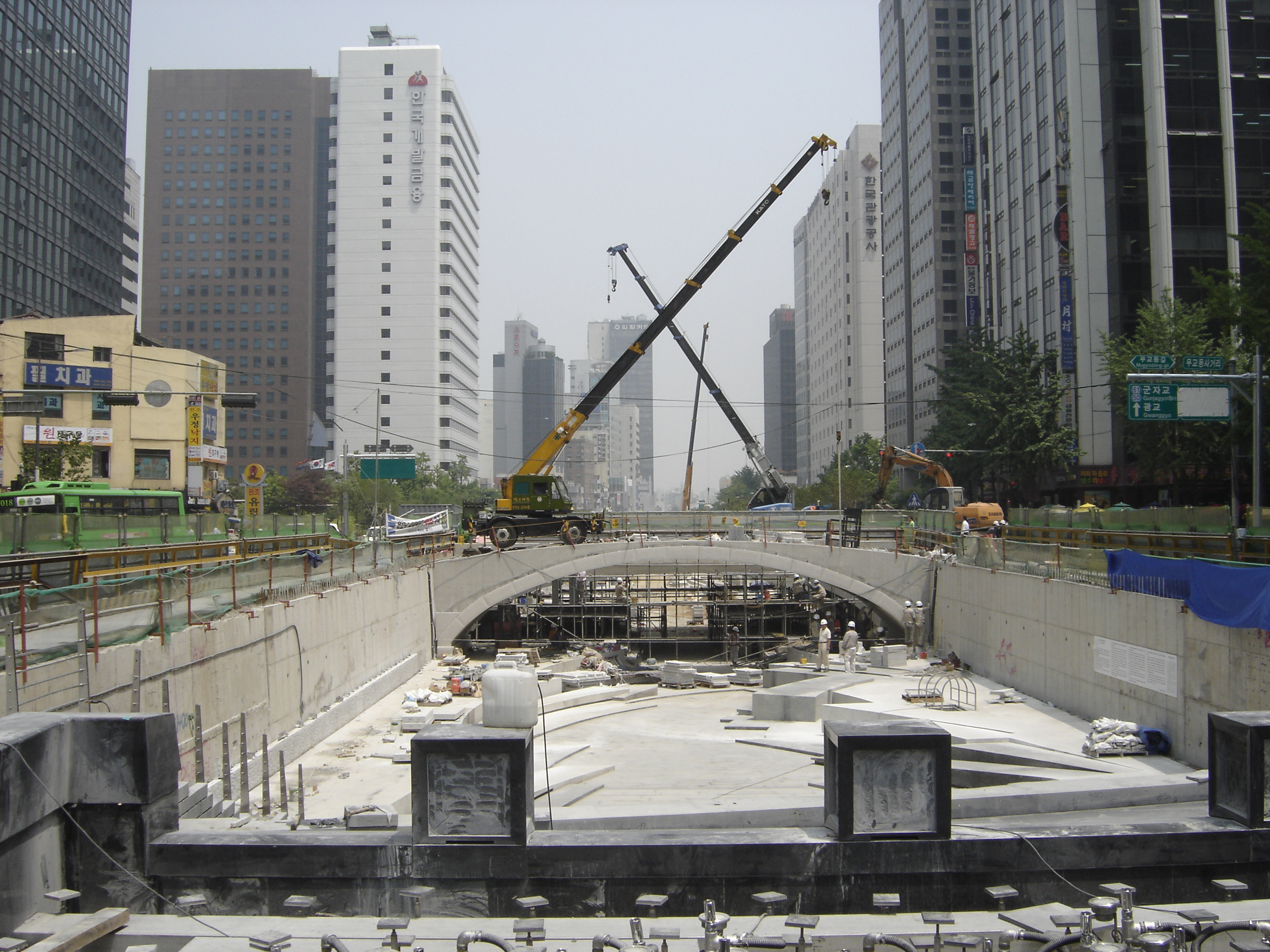
Cheonggyecheon under restoration in 2005

In July 2003, Mayor of Seoul Lee Myung-bak, initiated a project to remove the elevated highway and restore the stream. It was a major undertaking since the highway had to be removed and years of neglect and development had left the stream nearly dry. 120,000 tons of water were to be pumped in daily from the Han River, its tributaries, and groundwater from subway stations.

To address the consequent traffic problem, the Cheonggyecheon Restoration Project Headquarters established traffic flow measures in the downtown section affected by the restoration work and coordinated changes in the downtown traffic system based on the research of the Cheonggyecheon Restoration Research Corps. The restoration of two historic bridges, Gwangtonggyo and Supyogyo, was also a contentious issue, as several interest groups voiced opinions on how to restore historical and cultural sites and remains and whether to replace the bridges. The Cheonggyecheon restoration project preserved the unique identity of the natural environment and the historic resources in the CBD of Seoul, and to reinforce the surrounding business area with information technology, international affairs and digital industries.

== Consequences ==
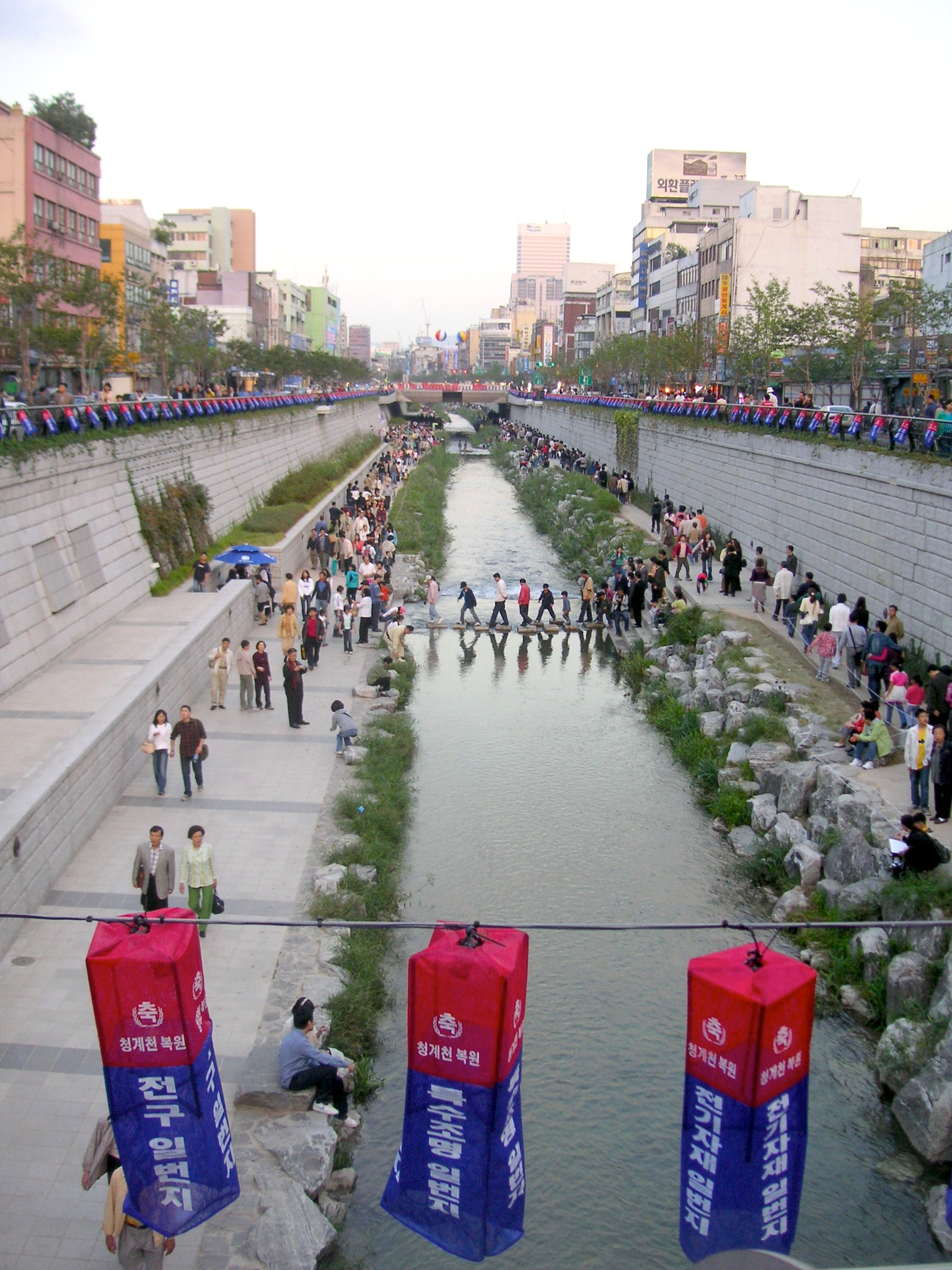
Shortly after reopening in 2005.

The stream was opened to the public in September 2005 and was lauded as a major success in urban renewal and beautification. However, there was considerable opposition from the previous mayoral administration of Goh Kun, which feared gentrification of the adjacent areas that housed many shops and small businesses in the machine trades. Indeed, the price of land within 50 meters of the stream has increased by 30-50%, double the rate of property increases in other areas of Seoul.
From 2002 to 2003, Cheonggyecheon area also saw a 3.5% increase in the number of businesses, which was double the rate of business growth in downtown Seoul. And its number of working people also increased by 0.8%, while that of downtown Seoul decreased by 2.6%.

Creating an environment with clean water and natural habitats was the most significant achievement of the project. From 2003 (pre-restoration works) to the end of 2008, biodiversity increased by 639%; the number of plant species increased from 62 to 308, fish species from 4 to 25, bird species from 6 to 36, aquatic invertebrate species from 5 to 53, insect species from 15 to 192, mammals from 2 to 4, and amphibians from 4 to 8.

The stream helps to reduce the urban heat island effect: along the stream, temperatures are 3.3° to 5.9 °C cooler than on a parallel road 4-7 blocks away.

The number of vehicles entering downtown Seoul has decreased by 2.3%, with an increasing number of users of buses (by 1.4%) and subways (by 4.3%: a daily average of 430,000 people) as a result of the demolition of the two heavily used roads. Between 2003 and the end of 2008, use of buses increased by 15.1% and use of subway by 3.3% in Seoul.

With air pollution reduced by 35% from 74 to 48 micrograms per cubic meter, respiratory diseases among the residents of the area have been considerably reduced; before the restoration, they were more than twice as likely to suffer from respiratory disease as those in other parts of the city.

The project sped up traffic around the city when the motorway was removed. It has been cited as a real-life example of Braess's paradox.

== Cost ==
Budgeted at ₩349 billion, the final cost of the project was over ₩386 billion (approximately US$281 million).

Some Korean environmental organizations have criticized its high costs and lack of ecological and historical authenticity, calling it purely symbolic and not truly beneficial to the city's eco-environment. Instead of using the restoration as an instrument of urban development the environmental organizations have called for a gradual long-term ecological and historical recovery of the entire Cheonggyecheon stream basin and its ecological system.

The cost of managing Cheonggyecheon has risen annually. From October 2005 to the end of 2016, maintenance and management cost of Cheonggyecheon totalled ₩85.7 billion, which averaged out to ₩7.1 billion per year.

== Award ==
The Cheonggyecheon Restoration Project has received in 2010 the Veronica Rudge Green Prize in Urban Design from Harvard University's Graduate School of Design.

== Gallery ==
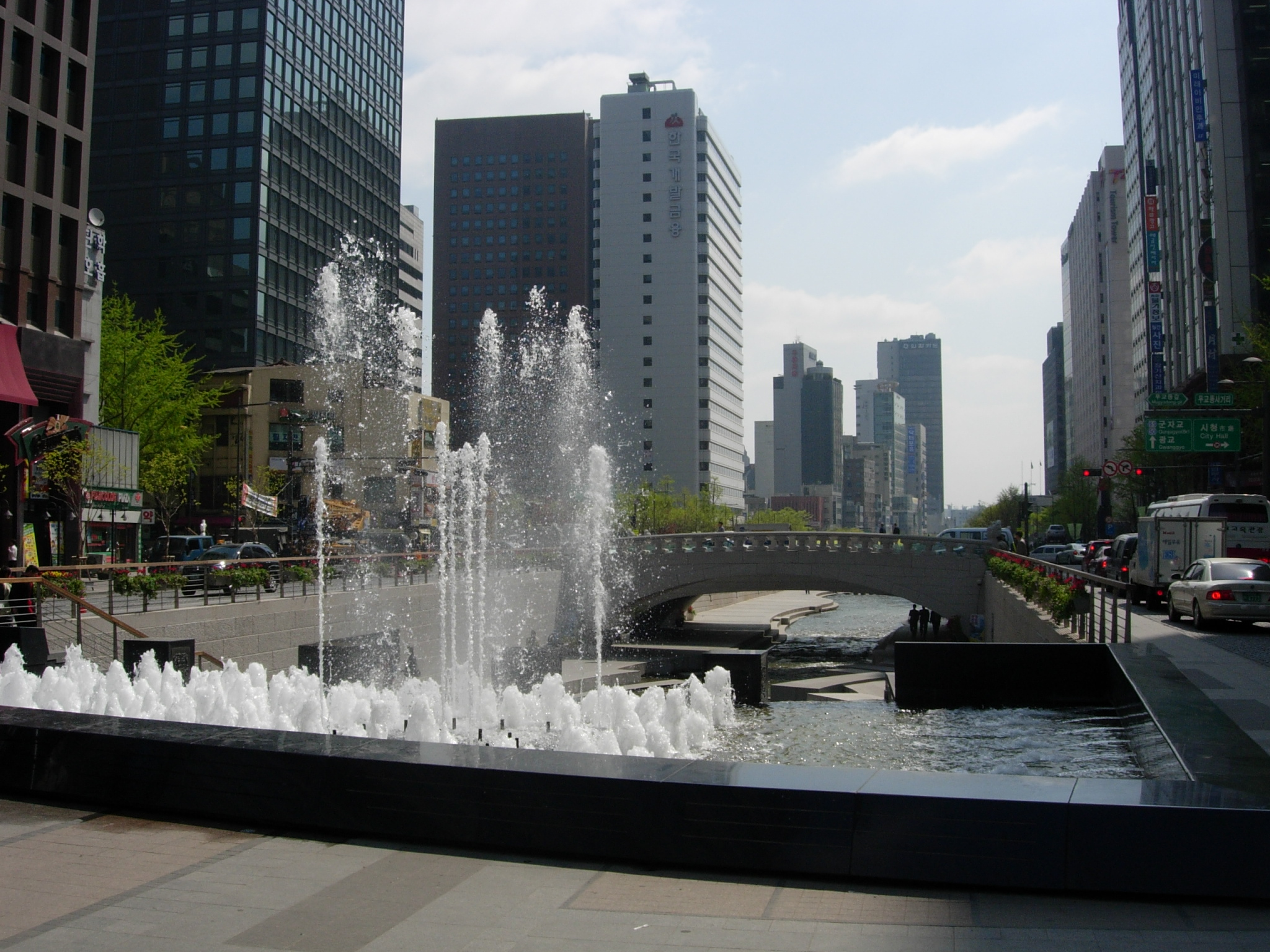
The beginning of Cheonggyeocheon

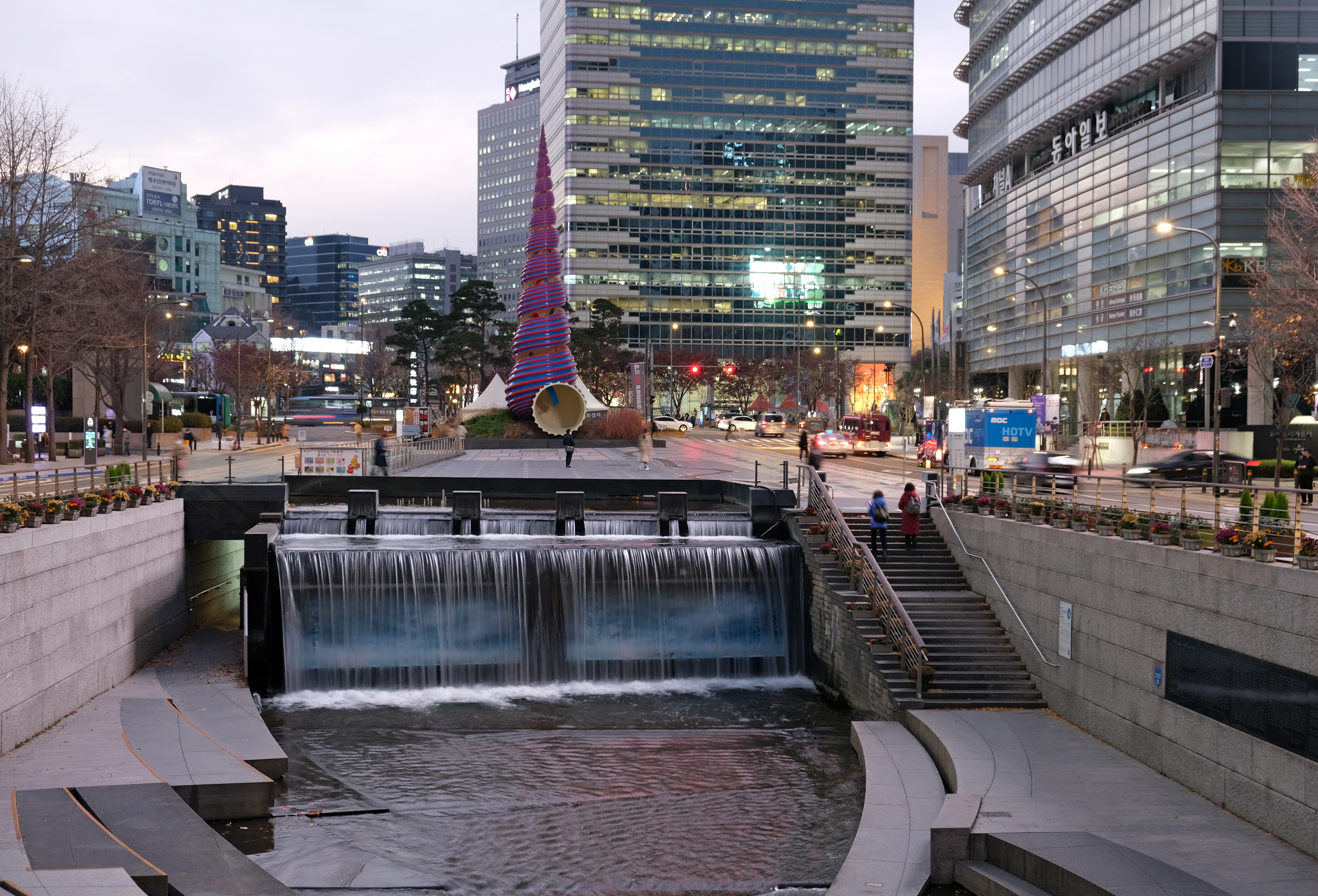
The beginning of Cheonggyeocheon, evening time

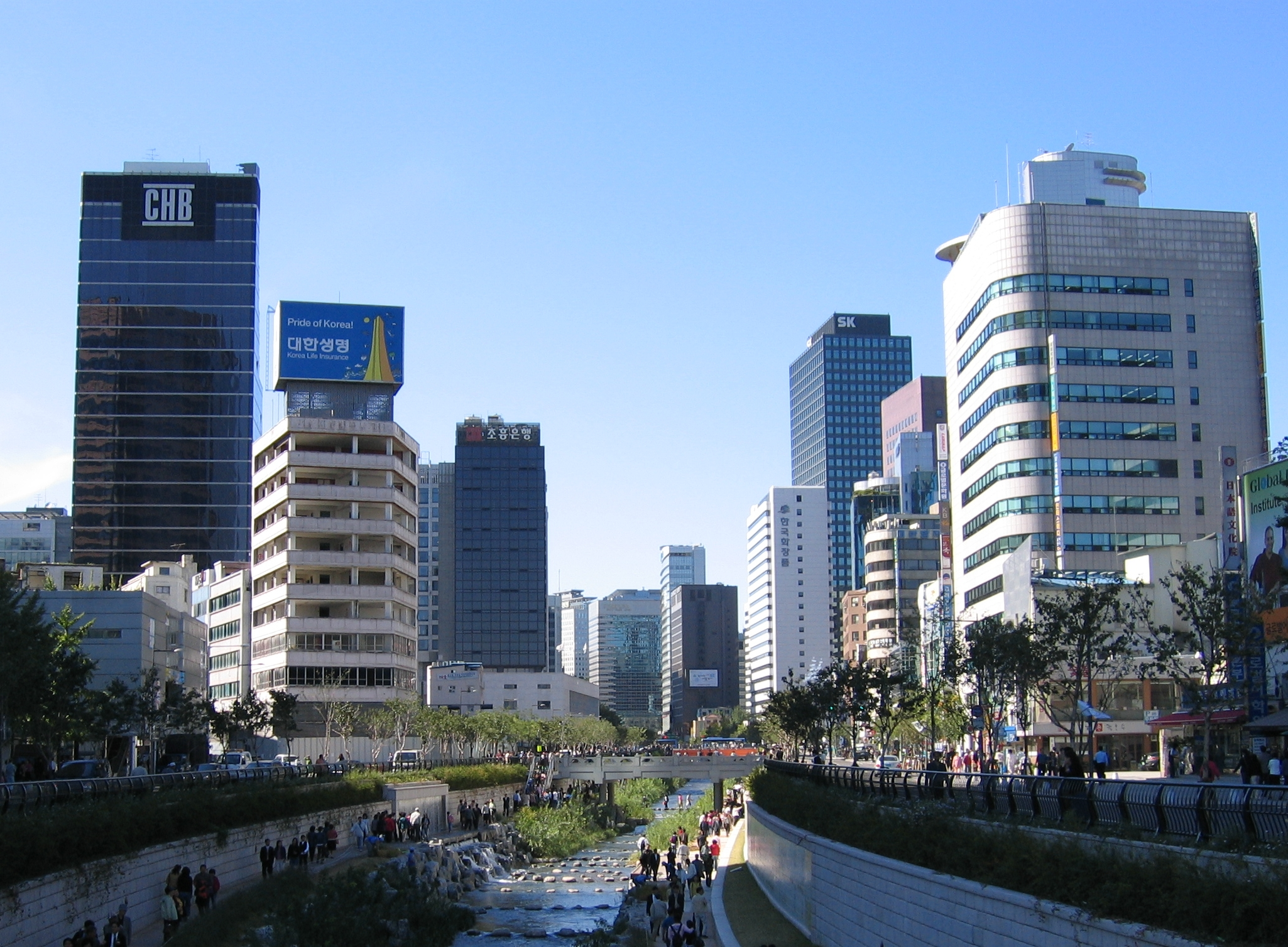
Cheonggyeocheon flowing through Seoul

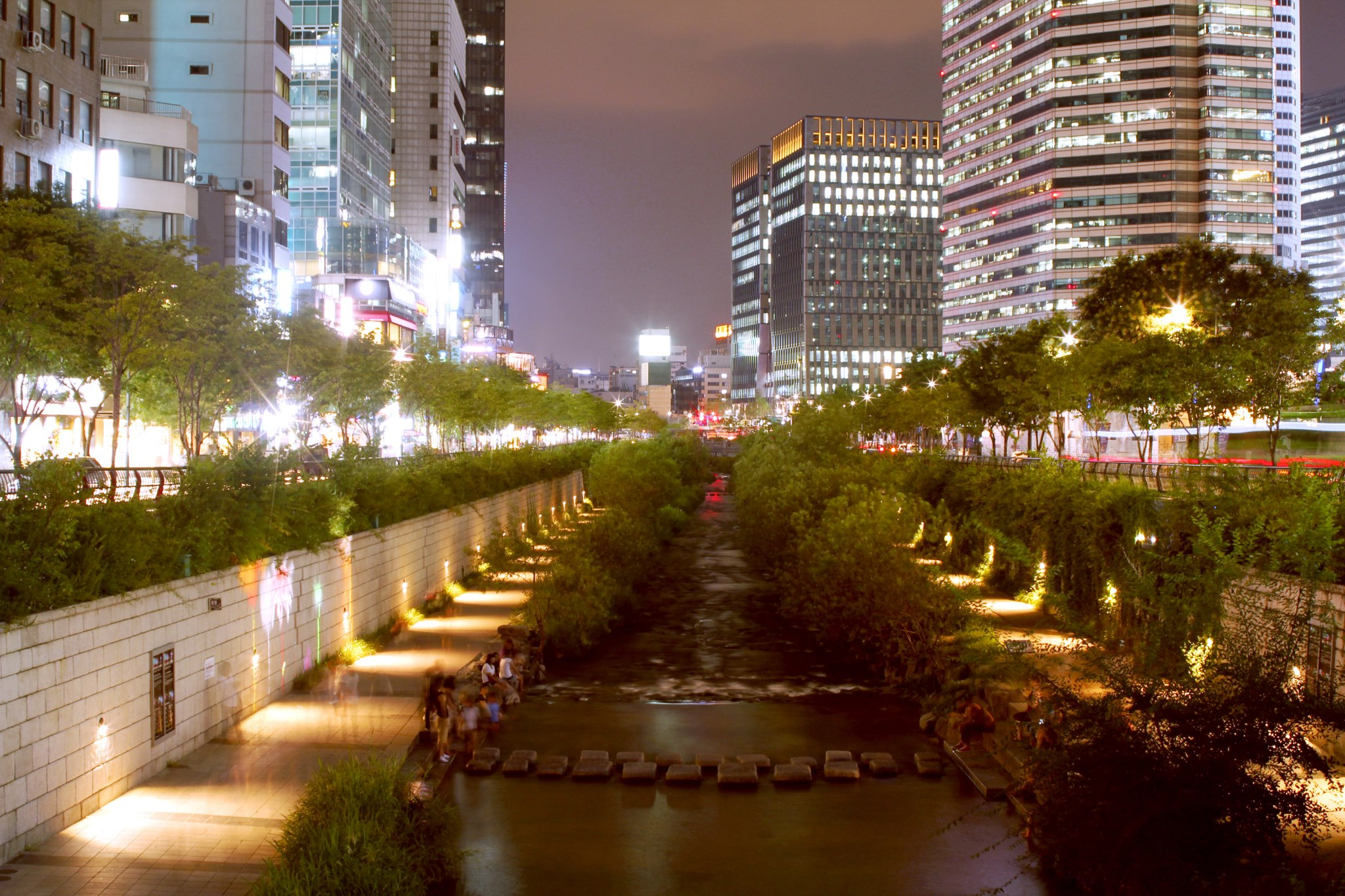
The Cheonggye at night

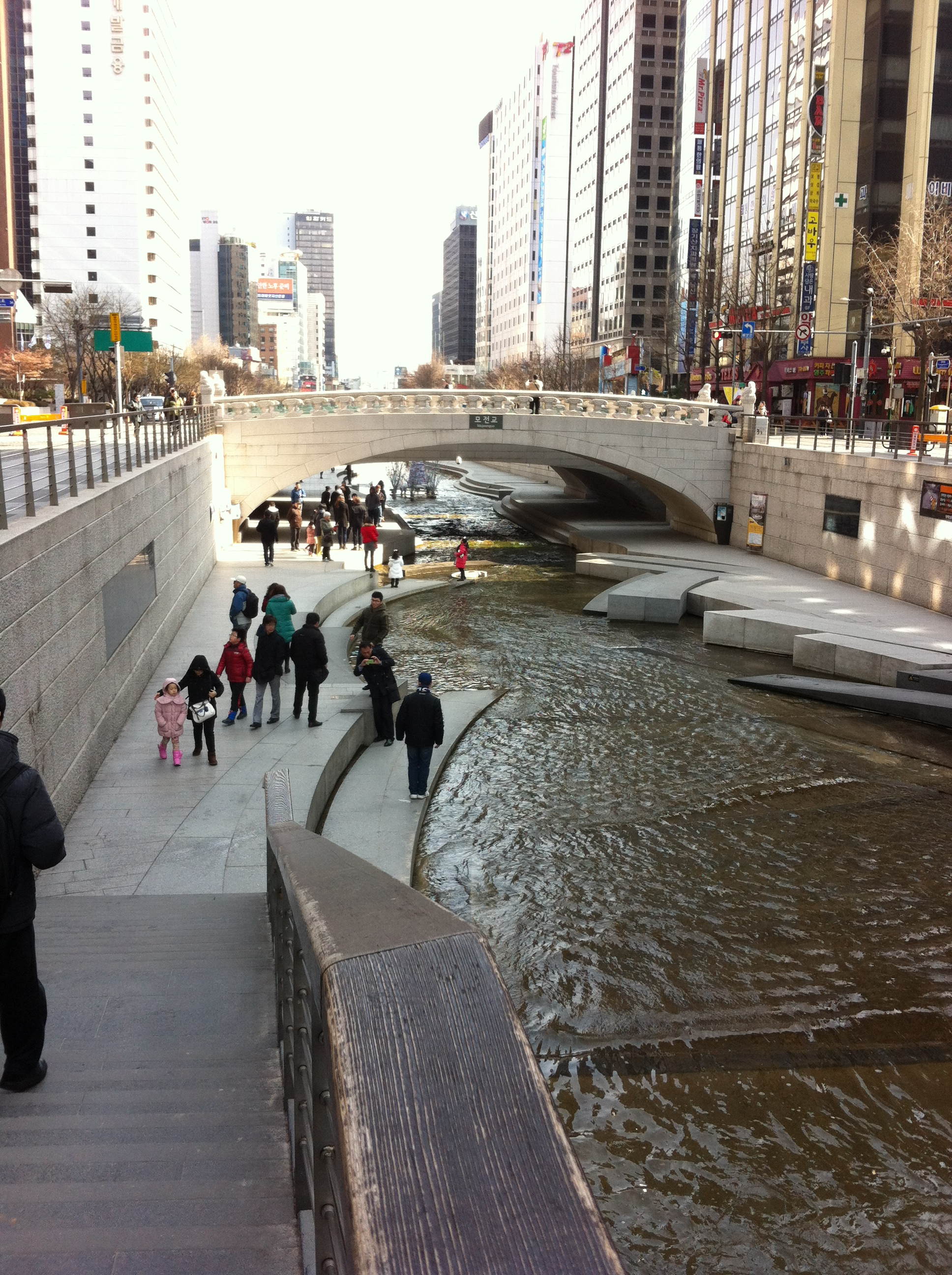
Cheonggye near Mojeongyo bridge

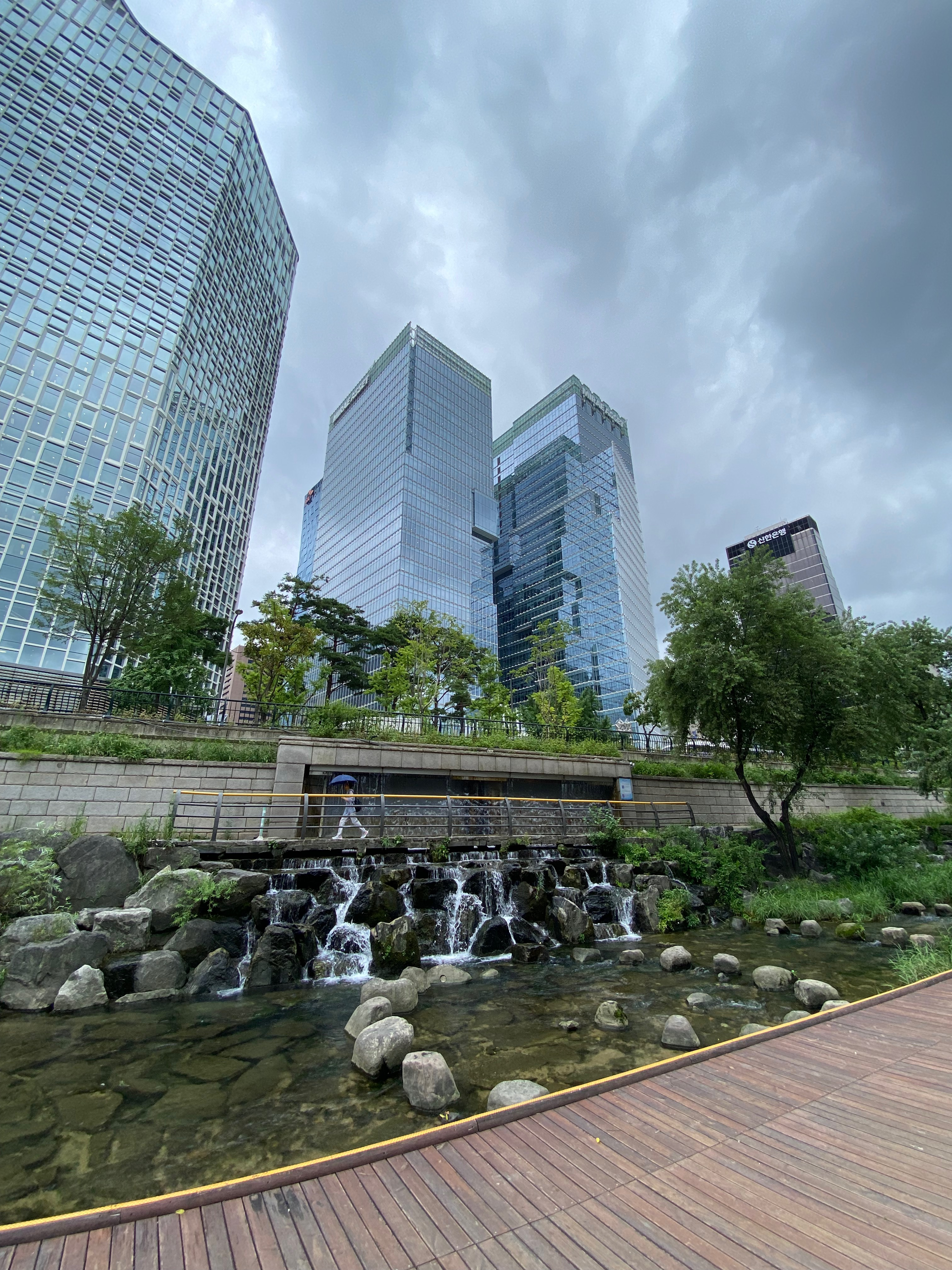
A mid-stream water feature

in the Jongno District

== See also ==
- Rivers of Korea
- Daylighting, the process of revealing rivers which have previously been covered over as part of urban development
- Seoul Peace Market
- Gwangjang Market
- Gwanghwamun Plaza
- Seoul Plaza
