= List of South Korean films of 2010 =

This is a list of South Korean films that have received or are due to receive a domestic theatrical release in 2010.

== Box office ==
The highest-grossing South Korean films released in 2010, by domestic box office gross revenue, are as follows:

Highest-grossing films released in 2010
Rank	Title	Distributor	Domestic gross
1	The Man from Nowhere	CJ Entertainment	$38,280,422
2	Secret Reunion	Showbox	$32,632,573
3	Moss	CJ Entertainment	$20,672,364
4	71: Into the Fire	Lotte Cultureworks	$19,367,711
5	Hello Ghost	Next Entertainment World	$17,925,938
6	Harmony	CJ Entertainment	$17,587,863
7	The Servant	CJ Entertainment	$18,277,442
8	The Unjust	CJ Entertainment	$17,075,362
9	Cyrano Agency	Lotte Cultureworks	$16,122,262
10	The Last Godfather	CJ Entertainment	$15,044,284

== Released ==
Released	English title	Korean title	Director	Cast	Admissions	Ref.
7 January	No Mercy	용서는 없다	Kim Hyeong-jun	Sul Kyung-gu, Ryoo Seung-bum, Han Hye-jin	1,125,154	
14 January	Lady Daddy	아빠가 여자를 좋아해	Lee Kwang-jae	Lee Na-young, Kim Ji-seok		
21 January	Attack the Gas Station 2	주유소 습격사건 2	Kim Sang-jin	Ji Hyun-woo, Jo Han-sun, Park Yeong-gyu		
28 January	Harmony	하모니	Kang Dae-kyu	Yunjin Kim, Na Moon-hee	3,044,032	
28 January	Le Grand Chef 2: Kimchi Battle	식객 2: 김치 전쟁	Kim Gil-hyeong, Baek Dong-hoon	Jin Goo, Kim Jung-eun		
4 February	Secret Reunion	의형제	Jang Hoon	Song Kang-ho, Kang Dong-won	5,459,295	
18 March	The Outlaw	Mubeopja	Kim Cheol-han	Kam Woo-sung, Jang Shin-yeong		
1 April	Lovers Vanished	폭풍전야	Cho Chang-ho	Kim Nam-gil, Hwang Woo-seul-hye		
29 April	Blades of Blood	구르믈 버서난 달처럼	Lee Joon-ik	Cha Seung-won, Hwang Jung-min, Baek Sung-hyun		
6 May	Hahaha	하하하	Hong Sang-soo	Kim Sang-kyung, Yoo Jun-sang		
13 May	The Housemaid	하녀	Im Sang-soo	Jeon Do-yeon, Lee Jung-jae, Seo Woo, Youn Yuh-jung	2,289,270	
13 May	Poetry	시	Lee Chang-dong	Yoon Jeong-hee, Lee David	220,213	
3 June	The Servant	방자전	Kim Dae-woo	Kim Joo-hyuk, Ryoo Seung-bum, Cho Yeo-jeong	3,014,523	
16 June	71: Into the Fire	포화 속으로	John H. Lee (Lee Jae-han)	Kwon Sang-woo, Cha Seung-won, Kim Seung-woo, T.O.P	3,356,085	
24 June	A Barefoot Dream	맨발의 꿈	Kim Tae-kyun	Park Hee-soon	338,569	
28 July	Death Bell 2: Bloody Camp	고死 두번째 이야기 : 교생실습	Yoo Sun-dong	Hwang Jung-eum, Park Ji-yeon		
4 August	The Man from Nowhere	아저씨	Lee Jeong-beom	Won Bin, Kim Sae-ron	6,226,886	
12 August	I Saw the Devil	악마를 보았다	Kim Jee-woon	Lee Byung-hun, Choi Min-sik	1,214,541	
16 September	Cyrano Agency	시라노; 연애조작단	Kim Hyun-seok	Uhm Tae-woong, Lee Min-jung, Choi Daniel		
16 September	A Better Tomorrow	무적자	Song Hae-sung	Joo Jin-mo, Song Seung-heon, Kim Kang-woo, Jo Han-sun	1,557,845	
28 October	Natalie	나탈리	Ju Kyung-jung	Lee Sung-jae, Park Hyun-jin, Kim Ji-hoon		
28 October	Come, Closer	조금만 더 가까이	Kim Jong-kwan	Yoon Kye-sang, Jung Yu-mi, Yoon Hee-seok, Yozoh		
10 November	Haunters	초능력자	Kim Min-suk	Go Soo, Kang Dong-won	2,152,577	
9 December	Finding Mr. Destiny	김종욱 찾기	Jang Yoo-jeong	Gong Yoo, Im Soo-jung	1,133,743	
22 December	The Yellow Sea	황해	Na Hong-jin	Ha Jung-woo, Kim Yoon-seok		

== See also ==
- List of 2010 box office number-one films in South Korea
