= 31st Blue Dragon Film Awards =

2010 edition of award ceremony

- Date: November 26, 2010
- Site: National Theater of Korea in Seoul
- Hosted by: Kim Hye-soo; Lee Beom-soo

Television coverage
- Network: KBS2

The 31st Blue Dragon Film Awards ceremony was held on November 26, 2010, at the National Theater of Korea in Seoul. It was broadcast on KBS2 and was hosted by actors Lee Beom-soo and Kim Hye-soo.

== Nominations and winners ==
Complete list of nominees and winners:

(Winners denoted in bold)

Best Film	Best Director
**Secret Reunion**; The Housemaid; Jeon Woo-chi: The Taoist Wizard; The Man from Nowhere; Moss	**Kang Woo-suk - Moss**; Choi Dong-hoon - Jeon Woo-chi: The Taoist Wizard; Im Sang-soo - The Housemaid; Jang Hoon - Secret Reunion; Lee Jeong-beom - The Man from Nowhere
Best Actor	Best Actress
**Jung Jae-young - Moss as Cheon Yong-deok**; Gang Dong-won - Secret Reunion as Song Ji-won; Lee Byung-hun - I Saw the Devil as Soo-hyun; Park Hee-soon - Barefoot Dream as Kim Won-kang; Won Bin - The Man from Nowhere as Cha Tae-sik	**Soo Ae** - **Midnight FM as Ko Sun-young**; **Yoon Jeong-hee** - **Poetry as Yang Mi-ja**; Jeon Do-yeon - The Housemaid as Eun-yi; Yunjin Kim - Harmony as Hong Jeong-hye; Seo Young-hee - Bedevilled as Kim Bok-nam
Best Supporting Actor	Best Supporting Actress
**Yoo Hae-jin** - **Moss as Kim Deok-cheon**; Ko Chang-seok - Secret Reunion as Vietnamese gang boss; Oh Dal-su - The Servant as Mr. Ma; Ryu Seung-ryong - Secret as Cho Gwang-cheol; Yoo Jun-sang - Moss as Park Min-wook	**Youn Yuh-jung** - **The Housemaid as Byeong-sik**; Kang Ye-won - Harmony as Kang Yu-mi; Na Moon-hee - Harmony as Kim Moon-ok; Ryu Hyun-kyung - The Servant as Hyang-dan; Yoo Sun - Moss as Lee Yeong-ji
Best New Actor	Best New Actress
**Choi Seung-hyun** - **71: Into the Fire as Oh Jang-beom**; Choi Daniel - Cyrano Agency as Lee Sang-yong; Go Soo - White Night as Kim Yo-han; Song Joong-ki - Hearty Paws 2 as Dong-wook; Song Sae-byeok - The Servant as Byeon Hak-do	**Lee Min-jung** - **Cyrano Agency as Kim Hee-joong**; Han Hye-jin - No Mercy as Min Seo-young; Ji Sung-won - Bedevilled as Hae-won; Jo Yeo-jeong - The Servant as Chun-hyang; Shim Eun-kyung - The Quiz Show Scandal as Kim Yeo-na
Best New Director	Best Screenplay
**Kim Kwang-sik - My Dear Desperado**; Jang Cheol-soo - Bedevilled; Kang Dae-kyu - Harmony; Kim Hyun-jun - No Mercy; Kwon Hyuk-jae - Who Are You	**Kim Hyun-seok** - **Cyrano Agency**; Choi Kwang-young - Bedevilled; Jang Min-seok - Secret Reunion; Kim Dae-woo - The Servant; Lee Jeong-beom - The Man from Nowhere
Best Cinematography	Best Art Direction
**Lee Mo-gae - I Saw the Devil**; Choi Chan-min - 71: Into the Fire; Choi Young-hwan - Jeon Woo-chi: The Taoist Wizard; Lee Mo-gae - Secret Reunion; Lee Tae-yoon - The Man from Nowhere	**Lee Ha-jun** - **The Housemaid**; Cho Hwa-sung - I Saw the Devil; Cho Hwa-sung - Jeon Woo-chi: The Taoist Wizard; Park Il-hyun - The Servant; Yang Hong-sam - The Man from Nowhere
Best Lighting	Best Music
**Kang Dae-hee** - **Moss**; Kim Sung-kwan - Jeon Woo-chi: The Taoist Wizard; Lee Cheol-oh - The Man from Nowhere; Oh Seung-chul - I Saw the Devil; Yoo Young-jong - 71: Into the Fire	**Mowg** - **I Saw the Devil**; Kim Jun-seong - Midnight FM; Kim Tae-seong - Cyrano Agency; Shim Hyeon-jeong - The Man from Nowhere; Shin Yi-kyung - Harmony
Technical Award	Best Short Film
**Park Jung-ryul** - **The Man from Nowhere (Martial arts)**; Jang Jin - Moss (Make-up); Jeong Do-an, Lee Hee-kyung - I Saw the Devil (Special effects); Jeong Do-an, Lee Hee-kyung - 71: Into the Fire (Special effects); AZ Works - Jeon Woo-chi: The Taoist Wizard	**Kkot Nim Yi**
Popular Star Award	Audience Choice Award for Most Popular Film
**Choi Seung-hyun** - **71: Into the Fire**; **Jo Yeo-jeong** - **The Servant**; **Son Ye-jin** - **White Night**; **Won Bin** - **The Man from Nowhere**	**The Man from Nowhere**
