= 47th Baeksang Arts Awards =

2011 edition of award ceremony

- Date: May 26, 2011
- Site: Kyung Hee University's Peace Palace Hall in Seoul
- Hosted by: Ryu Si-won; Kim Ah-joong

Television coverage
- Network: KBS2
- Duration: 2 hours

The 47th Baeksang Arts Awards ceremony was held at Kyung Hee University's Peace Palace Hall in Seoul on May 26, 2011, and was broadcast on KBS2. Presented by IS Plus Corp., it was hosted by actor Ryu Si-won and actress Kim Ah-joong.

== Nominations and winners ==
Complete list of nominees and winners:

(Winners denoted in bold)

=== Film ===
Grand Prize (Film)
**Lee Byung-hun - I Saw the Devil**
Best Film	Best Screenplay
**The Man from Nowhere**; Moss; Poetry; The Unjust; The Yellow Sea	**Yook Sang-hyo** - **He's on Duty**; Kim Dae-woo - The Servant; Kim Hyun-seok - Cyrano Agency; Lee Chang-dong - Poetry; Park Hoon-jung - The Unjust
Best Actor (Film)	Best Actress (Film)
**Ha Jung-woo - The Yellow Sea as Gu-nam**; Cha Tae-hyun - Hello Ghost as Sang-man; Lee Byung-hun - I Saw the Devil as Soo-hyun; Ryoo Seung-bum - The Unjust as Joo Yang; Won Bin - The Man from Nowhere as Cha Tae-sik	**Tang Wei** - **Late Autumn as Anna**; Jo Yeo-jeong - The Servant as Chunhyang; Seo Young-hee - Bedevilled as Kim Bok-nam; Soo Ae - Midnight FM as Go Sun-young; Yoon Jeong-hee - Poetry as Yang Mi-ja
Best New Actor (Film)	Best New Actress (Film)
**Choi Seung-hyun** - **71: Into the Fire as Oh Jang-beom**; Cho Jin-woong - Glove as Charles; Choi Daniel - Cyrano Agency as Lee Sang-yong; Song Sae-byeok - The Servant as Byun Hak-do; Um Ki-joon - Man of Vendetta as Choi Byeong-chul	**Shin Hyun-bin** - **He's on Duty as Jang-mi**; Ji Sung-won - Bedevilled as Hae-won; Kim Sae-ron - The Man from Nowhere as So-mi; Lee Min-jung - Cyrano Agency as Kim Hee-joong; Shim Eun-kyung - Happy Killers as Kim Ha-rin
Best Director (Film)	Best New Director (Film)
**Lee Chang-dong** - **Poetry**; Kang Woo-suk - Moss; Lee Jeong-beom - The Man from Nowhere; Na Hong-jin - The Yellow Sea; Ryoo Seung-wan - The Unjust	**Kim Young-tak** - **Hello Ghost**; Jang Cheol-soo - Bedevilled; Jang Yoo-jeong - Finding Mr. Destiny; Kim Jung-hoon - Petty Romance; Kim Kwang-sik - My Dear Desperado
Most Popular - Actor (Film)	Most Popular - Actress (Film)
**Choi Seung-hyun** - **71: Into the Fire as Oh Jang-beom**	**Park Shin-hye** - **Cyrano Agency as Min-young**

=== Television ===
Grand Prize (Television)
**Hyun Bin** - **Secret Garden**
Best Drama	Best Screenplay (Television)
**Secret Garden**; Dong Yi; Giant; Bread, Love and Dreams; Sungkyunkwan Scandal	**Kim Eun-sook** - **Secret Garden**; Jang Young-chul - Giant; Jung Ha-yeon - Flames of Desire; Kang Eun-kyung - Bread, Love and Dreams; Kim Gyu-wan - Cinderella's Sister
Best Educational Program	Best Entertainment Program
**What Is School**	**Come to Play**
Best Director (Television)	Best New Director (Television)
**Lee Jung-sub** - **Bread, Love and Dreams**; Jung Eul-young - Life Is Beautiful; Lee Byung-hoon - Dong Yi; Shin Woo-chul - Secret Garden; Yoo In-shik - Giant	**Kim Won-seok** - **Sungkyunkwan Scandal**; Kim Dae-jin - Life Is Good; Lee Dong-hoon - Daring Women; Lee Eung-bok - Dream High
Best Actor (Television)	Best Actress (Television)
**Jeong Bo-seok - Giant as Jo Pil-yeon**; Hyun Bin - Secret Garden as Kim Joo-won; Kwon Sang-woo - Big Thing as Ha Do-ya; Lee Beom-soo - Giant as Lee Kang-mo; Yoon Shi-yoon - Bread, Love and Dreams as Kim Tak-gu	**Han Hyo-joo - Dong Yi as Dong-yi (Choi Suk-bin)**; Ha Ji-won - Secret Garden as Gil Ra-im; Jeon In-hwa - Bread, Love and Dreams as Seo In-suk; Kim Ah-joong - Sign as Go Da-kung; Park Min-young - Sungkyunkwan Scandal as Kim Yoon-hee
Best New Actor (Television)	Best New Actress (Television)
**Park Yoochun - Sungkyunkwan Scandal as Lee Sun-joon**; Kim Soo-hyun - Dream High as Song Sam-dong; Kim Sung-oh - Secret Garden as Secretary Kim; Ok Taecyeon - Cinderella's Sister as Han Jung-woo; Park Jin-young - Dream High as Yang Jin-man	**Yoo In-na - Secret Garden as Im Ah-young**; Bae Suzy - Dream High as Go Hye-mi; Lee Si-young - Becoming a Billionaire as Bu Tae-hee; Nam Gyu-ri - Life Is Beautiful as Yang Cho-rong; Park Ha-sun - Dong Yi as Queen Inhyeon
Best Variety Performer - Male	Best Variety Performer - Female
**Lee Soo-geun - 1 Night, 2 Days**	**Kim Won-hee - Come to Play**
Most Popular - Actor (Television)	Most Popular - Actress (Television)
**Park Yoochun - Sungkyunkwan Scandal as Lee Sun-joon**	**Moon Geun-young - Cinderella's Sister as Song Eun-jo**

=== Other awards ===
- **InStyle Fashionista Award** - Lee Min-jung
- **Lifetime Achievement Award** - Shin Seong-il
