= Hwang Geum-hee =

South Korean actress (born 1977)

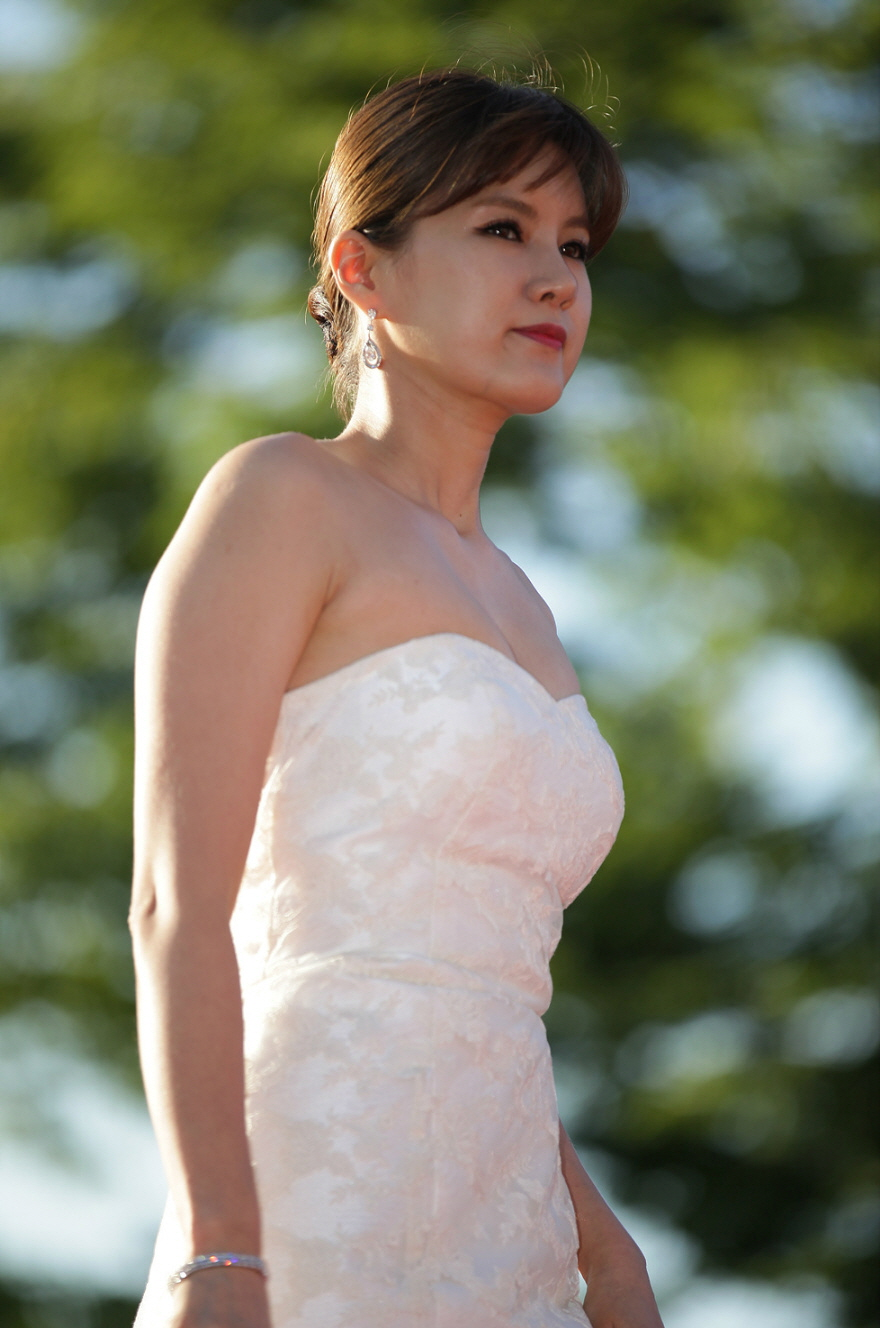
- Hwang in 2015
- Born: August 20, 1977 (age 49); South Korea
- Other name: Ji Sung-won
- Education: Dongguk University - Theater and Film
- Occupation: Actress
- Years active: 2000–present

Korean name
- Hangul: 황금희
- RR: Hwang Geumhui
- MR: Hwang Kŭmhŭi

Hwang Geum-hee (Korean: 황금희; born August 20, 1977) is a South Korean actress. Previously known by her stage name Ji Sung-won (지성원), Hwang began using her real name professionally in August 2013. Her most notable work is the critically acclaimed horror film Bedevilled (2010).

== Filmography ==
=== Film ===
Year	Title	Role
2000	Chunhyang	College student
2010	Harmony	Hyeon-joo
2010	Bedevilled	Hae-won
2013	Twisted Daddy	
2014	An American Friend	Ji-yoon
2014	My Sister	Oh Jin-seo
2015	Empire of Lust	Mae-hyang
2016	Twisted Daddy	
2016	With or Without You	Yoo Min-joo
2018	The End	Sung-min's wife

=== Television series ===
Year	Title	Role	Network
2000	Popcorn		SBS
2000	Cheers for the Women		SBS
2005	Shin Don	Lady Yoon Hee-bi	MBC
2006	Yeon Gaesomun	Ui Ji-nyeo	SBS
2006	Snow Flower	Lee Shin-ae	SBS
2007	Bad Couple	Ahn Jung-sook	SBS
2008	Life Special Investigation Team	Park Hyun-joo	MBC
2008	Lee San, Wind of the Palace	Lady Hong Won-bin	MBC
2009	Ja Myung Go	Dong Go-bi	SBS
2014	Doctor Stranger	Pregnant Woman (Cameo)	SBS
2014	My Spring Days		MBC
2015–2016	The Stars are Shining		KBS2
2021	Revolutionary Sisters	Sang Gan-nam's wife	KBS2

== Awards and nominations ==
Year	Award	Category	Nominated work	Result
2000	SBS Top Talent Contest	Silver Prize	—N/a	Won
2010	47th Grand Bell Awards	Best New Actress	Bedevilled	Nominated
2010	8th Korean Film Awards	Best New Actress	Bedevilled	Nominated
2010	31st Blue Dragon Film Awards	Best New Actress	Bedevilled	Nominated
2010	18th Korean Culture and Entertainment Awards	Best New Actress (Film)	Bedevilled	Won
2011	47th Baeksang Arts Awards	Best New Actress (Film)	Bedevilled	Nominated
2011	33rd Golden Cinematography Awards	Best New Actress	Bedevilled	Won
