= 47th Grand Bell Awards =

2010 edition of award ceremony

- Date: October 29, 2010
- Site: Hall of Peace in Kyung Hee University, Seoul
- Hosted by: Shin Dong-yup; Kim Jung-eun

The 47th Grand Bell Awards (Korean: 대종상 영화제; RR: Daejongsang Yeonghwajae), also known as Daejong Film Awards, are determined and presented annually by The Motion Pictures Association of Korea for excellence in film in South Korea. The Grand Bell Awards were first presented in 1962 and have gained prestige as the Korean equivalent of the American Academy Awards.

== 47th ceremony ==
The 47th Grand Bell Awards ceremony was held at the Kyung Hee University's Hall of Peace in Seoul on October 29, 2010, and hosted by Shin Dong-yup and Kim Jung-eun.

== Nominations and winners ==
(Winners denoted in bold)

Best Film	Best Director
**Poetry**; A Barefoot Dream; Bedevilled; Harmony; The Housemaid; I Saw the Devil; The Man from Nowhere; Moss; Secret Reunion; The Servant	**Kang Woo-suk** - **Moss**; Im Sang-soo - The Housemaid; Jang Cheol-soo - Bedevilled; Jang Hoon - Secret Reunion; Kim Tae-kyun - A Barefoot Dream; Lee Chang-dong - Poetry; Lee Jeong-beom - The Man from Nowhere
Best Actor	Best Actress
**Won Bin** - **The Man from Nowhere**; Choi Min-sik - I Saw the Devil; Jung Jae-young - Moss; Gang Dong-won - Secret Reunion; Lee Byung-hun - I Saw the Devil; Park Hee-soon - A Barefoot Dream; Song Kang-ho - Secret Reunion	**Yoon Jeong-hee** - **Poetry**; Jeon Do-yeon - The Housemaid; Jo Yeo-jeong - The Servant; Yunjin Kim - Harmony; Seo Young-hee - Bedevilled
Best Supporting Actor	Best Supporting Actress
**Kim Hee-ra** - **Poetry**; **Song Sae-byeok** - **The Servant**; Ko Chang-seok - A Barefoot Dream; Oh Dal-su - The Servant; Park Jeong-hak - Bedevilled; Yoo Hae-jin - Moss	**Youn Yuh-jung** - **The Housemaid**; Baek Soo-ryun - Bedevilled; Kang Ye-won - Harmony; Ryu Hyun-kyung - The Servant; Seo Woo - The Housemaid
Best New Actor	Best New Actress
**Jung Woo** - **Wish**; Choi Daniel - Cyrano Agency; Choi Seung-hyun - 71: Into the Fire; Song Sae-byeok - Troubleshooter; Um Ki-joon - Man of Vendetta	**Lee Min-jung** - **Cyrano Agency**; Ji Sung-won - Bedevilled; Kang Ye-won - Harmony; Lee Ah-yi - Miss Staff Sergeant; Shim Eun-kyung - Happy Killers
Best New Director	Best Screenplay
**Jang Cheol-soo** - **Bedevilled**; Kang Dae-gyu - Harmony; Kim Kwang-sik - My Dear Desperado; Kwon Hyeok-jae - Troubleshooter; Lee Seong-han - Wish	**Lee Chang-dong** - **Poetry**
Best Cinematography	Best Editing
**Kim Sung-bok, Kim Yong-heung** - **Moss**; Kim Hyun-seok - Poetry; Lee Mo-gae - I Saw the Devil; Lee Mo-gae - Secret Reunion; Lee Tae-yoon - The Man from Nowhere	**Kim Sang-bum, Kim Jae-bum** - **The Man from Nowhere**
Best Art Direction	Best Lighting
**Jo Sung-won, Lee Tae-hun** - **Moss**	**Oh Seung-chul** - **I Saw the Devil**
Best Costume Design	Best Music
**Jung Kyung-hee** - **The Servant**; Choi Se-yeon - The Housemaid; Jo Sang-gyeong - Moss; Kwon Yu-jin - I Saw the Devil; Lee Choong-yeon - Poetry	**Kim Jun-seok** - **A Barefoot Dream**
Best Visual Effects	Best Sound Effects
**Kim Tae-ui** - **The Man from Nowhere**	**Oh Se-jin, Kim Suk-won** - **Moss**
Best Planning	Special Award for Foreign Film
**Kim Joon-jong** - **A Barefoot Dream**	**Abdulhamid Juma**
Popularity Award	Korean Wave Popularity Award
**Lee Min-jung** - **Cyrano Agency**; **Won Bin** - **The Man from Nowhere**	**Choi Seung-hyun** - **71: Into the Fire**
Proud Filmmaker Award	Lifetime Achievement Award
**Shin Young-kyun**	**Choi Eun-hee** (Actress)
