= 5th Asian Film Awards =

2011 edition of award ceremony

- Date: March 21, 2011
- Site: Hong Kong Convention and Exhibition Center
- Hosted by: Angela Chow; Janet Hsieh

Highlights
- Best Film: Uncle Boonmee Who Can Recall His Past Lives
- Most awards: Aftershock (3)
- Most nominations: Aftershock and Peepli Live (4)

The 5th Asian Film Awards was given in a ceremony on 21 March 2011 as part of the Hong Kong International Film Festival.

== Nominees and winners ==
=== Best Film ===
- Winner: Uncle Boonmee Who Can Recall His Past Lives (Thailand)
  - Aftershock (China)
  - Confessions (Japan)
  - Let the Bullets Fly (China/Hong Kong)
  - Peepli Live (India)
  - Poetry (South Korea)

=== Best Director ===
- Winner: Lee Chang-dong, Poetry (South Korea)
  - Feng Xiaogang, Aftershock (China)
  - Jiang Wen, Let the Bullets Fly (China/Hong Kong)
  - Takashi Miike, 13 Assassins (Japan)
  - Na Hong-jin, The Yellow Sea (South Korea)
  - Tetsuya Nakashima, Confessions (Japan)

=== Best Actor ===
- Winner: Ha Jung-woo, The Yellow Sea (South Korea)
  - Chow Yun-fat, Let the Bullets Fly (China/Hong Kong)
  - Ge You, Sacrifice (China/Hong Kong)
  - Ethan Juan, Monga (Taiwan)
  - Kōji Yakusho, 13 Assassins (Japan)

=== Best Actress ===
- Winner: Xu Fan, Aftershock (China)
  - Jeon Do-yeon, The Housemaid (South Korea)
  - Rinko Kikuchi, Norwegian Wood (Japan)
  - Takako Matsu, Confessions (Japan)
  - Michelle Yeoh, Reign of Assassins (Malaysia/China/Hong Kong/Thailand)

=== Best Newcomer ===
- Winner: Mark Chao, Monga (Taiwan)
  - Aarif Lee, Echoes of the Rainbow (Hong Kong)
  - Omkar Das Manikpuri, Peepli Live (India)
  - T.O.P, 71: Into the Fire (South Korea)
  - Zhou Dongyu, Under the Hawthorn Tree (China)

=== Best Supporting Actor ===
- Winner: Sammo Hung, Ip Man 2 (Hong Kong)
  - Huang Xiaoming, Sacrifice (China/Hong Kong)
  - Masaki Okada, Confessions (Japan)
  - Ryoo Seung-bum, The Unjust (South Korea)
  - Yoo Hae-jin, Moss (South Korea)

=== Best Supporting Actress ===
- Winner: Youn Yuh-jung, The Housemaid (South Korea)
  - Yū Aoi, Ototo (Japan)
  - Yoshino Kimura, Confessions (Japan)
  - Carina Lau, Let the Bullets Fly (China/Hong Kong)
  - Shanty Paredes, Madame X (Indonesia)

=== Best Screenwriter ===
- Winner: Lee Chang-dong, Poetry (South Korea)
  - Jiang Wen and Jiang Wen, Let the Bullets Fly (China/Hong Kong)
  - Pang Ho-cheung and Heiward Mak, Love in a Puff (film) (Hong Kong)
  - Su Chao-Pin, Reign of Assassins (China/Hong Kong/Thailand)
  - Park Hoon-Jung, The Unjust (South Korea)

=== Best Cinematographer ===
- Winner: Mark Lee Ping Bin, Norwegian Wood) (Japan)
  - Lee Mo-gae, I Saw the Devil (South Korea)
  - Hassan Kydyraliyev, The Light Thief (Kyrgyzstan)
  - Kenny Tse Chung-to, The Stool Pigeon (Hong Kong)
  - Jake Pollock, Monga (Taiwan)

=== Best Production Designer ===
- Winner: Hayashida Yuji, 13 Assassins (Japan)
  - James Sung-pong, Detective Dee and the Mystery of the Phantom Flame (China/Hong Kong)
  - Eros Eflin, Madame X (Indonesia)
  - Huang Mei-Ching and Chen Po-Jen, Monga (Taiwan)
  - Lee Hwo-kyoung, The Yellow Sea (South Korea)

=== Best Composer ===
- Winner: Indian Ocean, Peepli Live (India)
  - Saito Kazuyoshi, Golden Slumbers (Japan)
  - Sandee Chan, Monga (Taiwan)
  - Peter Kam Pui-tat and Anthony Chue, Reign of Assassins (China/Hong Kong/Taiwan)
  - Jang Young-gyu and Lee Byung-hoon, The Yellow Sea (South Korea)

=== Best Editor ===
- Winner: Nam Na-young, I Saw the Devil (South Korea)
  - Kenji Yamashita, 13 Assassins (Japan)
  - Koike Yoshiyuki, Confessions (Japan)
  - Hemanti Sarkar, Peepli Live (India)
  - Meng Peicong, Under the Hawthorn Tree (film) (China)

=== Best Visual Effects ===
- Winner: Phil Jones and Jiang Yan-ming, Aftershock (China)
  - Kim Tae-hun and Ryu Hee-jung, 71: Into the Fire (South Korea)
  - Phil Jones, Detective Dee and the Mystery of the Phantom Flame (China/Hong Kong)
  - Yamazaki Takashi, Space Battleship Yamato (Japan)
  - Park Jung-ryul, The Man from Nowhere (South Korea)

=== Best Costume Designer ===
- Winner: William Chang Suk Ping, Let the Bullets Fly (China/Hong Kong)
  - Sawataishi Kazuhiro, 13 Assassins (Japan)
  - Bruce Yu Ka-on, Detective Dee and the Mystery of the Phantom Flame (China/Hong Kong)
  - Yen-Khe Luguern, Norwegian Wood (Japan)
  - Choi Se-yeon, The Housemaid (South Korea)

=== Special awards ===
- Lifetime Achievement Award: Raymond Chow (Hong Kong)
- Asian Film Award for Outstanding Contribution to Asian Cinema: Kim Dong-ho (South Korea)
- The Asian Film Awards for 2010’s Top Grossing Asian Film: Feng Xiaogang, Aftershock (China)
- Award for the Promotion of Asian CinemaBack: Fortissimo Films

=== People's Choice Awards ===
- Favorite Actor: Chow Yun-fat, Let the Bullets Fly (China/Hong Kong)
- Favorite Actress: Jeon Do-yeon, The Housemaid (South Korea)
