= The Housemaid (2010 film) =

2010 South Korean film directed by Im Sang-soo

- Theatrical release poster
- Hangul: 하녀
- Hanja: 下女
- RR: Hanyeo
- MR: Hanyŏ
- Directed by: Im Sang-soo
- Written by: Im Sang-soo
- Based on: The Housemaid by Kim Ki-young
- Produced by: Jason Chae
- Starring: Jeon Do-yeon; Lee Jung-jae; Youn Yuh-jung; Seo Woo
- Cinematography: Lee Hyung-deok
- Edited by: Lee Eun-soo
- Music by: Kim Hong-jib
- Production companies: Mirovision; Sidus FNH; CJ Venture Investment; Michigan Venture Capital
- Distributed by: Sidus FNH
- Release date: 13 May 2010
- Running time: 107 minutes
- Country: South Korea
- Language: Korean
- Box office: US$14.7 million

The Housemaid (Korean: 하녀; RR: Hanyeo) is a 2010 South Korean erotic psychological thriller film directed by Im Sang-soo. The story focuses on Eun-yi, played by Jeon Do-yeon, who becomes involved in a destructive love triangle while working as a housemaid for an upper-class family. Other cast members include Lee Jung-jae, Youn Yuh-jung and Seo Woo. The film is a remake of Kim Ki-young's 1960 film of the same name. It competed for the Palme d'Or at the 2010 Cannes Film Festival.

== Plot ==
The film opens with a bustling city street, where a young woman commits suicide by jumping from a building ledge. Eun-yi, who works in a restaurant, persuades her coworker and roommate to drive her to the scene of the suicide, and she stands distraught over the chalk outline where the woman's body had lain. The next morning, an older woman named Byeong-sik visits her small apartment and later expresses interest in giving her a job.

Eun-yi is hired as an au pair for Hae-ra, who is pregnant with twins, and her rich husband Hoon. Eun-yi's primary task is watching the couple's young daughter, Nami. Eun-yi is eager to connect with Nami, who gradually warms to her. Hoon begins to secretly flirt with Eun-yi, enticing her with glasses of wine and his piano playing, and they eventually begin a sexual relationship. Despite the affair, Eun-yi is still warm and friendly to Hoon's oblivious wife, Hae-ra; she even expresses enthusiasm and delight at the progress of Hae-ra's pregnancy.

Byeong-sik, aka "Miss Cho" (the other live-in maid, originally Hae-ra's childhood maid), witnesses Eun-yi and Hoon having sex. She tries to subtly pry details from Eun-yi, but Eun-yi brushes her off casually. Later, Miss Cho reveals her suspicion that Eun-yi is pregnant to Hae-ra's mother, Mi-hee. Mi-hee then visits the family and stages an "accident," resulting in Eun-yi falling from a ladder positioned at the top of a set of stairs. Dangling from a chandelier, Eun-yi begs Mi-hee to pull her over the railing. She does not oblige, and Eun-yi falls. Suffering only a concussion, Eun-yi spends the night in the hospital. During her stay, she learns that she is pregnant and contemplates abortion. Meanwhile, the affair is revealed to Hae-ra.

Mi-hee instructs Hae-ra to ignore the affair; she insists that all wealthy husbands will eventually cheat and that if Hae-ra ignores it she can "live like a queen." Later that night, Hae-ra stands over Eun-yi's bed with a golf club but is unable to strike the sleeping woman. The next day, Hae-ra and her mother confront Eun-yi, offering her $100,000 to have an abortion and leave. Hae-ra knows that Eun-yi would not abort her child "for all the money in the world," so she takes matters into her own hands by poisoning the herbal medicine packets Eun-yi drinks every day. Hae-ra goes to the hospital and delivers her twin sons. Hoon visits the hospital, where Hae-ra makes her ill-will toward him known. Furious, he returns home alone and finds Eun-yi in his bathtub. She reveals that she is pregnant with his child and plans on keeping the baby.

Eun-yi falls unconscious due to the effects of the poison, and Mi-hee arranges an abortion without Eun-yi's consent. After the abortion, Miss Cho reveals to Eun-yi that she was the one who told Mi-hee about Eun-yi's pregnancy. Eun-yi is angry, but forgives Miss Cho and vows to get revenge on the family. After recovering from the unwanted abortion, Eun-yi sneaks into the house with Miss Cho's assistance. Hoon finds her breastfeeding one of the newborn babies. Hae-ra insists that Miss Cho chase Eun-yi out of the house, but Miss Cho refuses and quits her job on the spot. Eun-yi then confronts the entire family (Hae-ra, Mi-hee, Hoon, and Nami), hanging herself from the same chandelier she once clung to, then lighting her body on fire as the family watches in horror.

The final scene depicts the family outdoors in the snow celebrating Nami's birthday, all speaking English. While Hae-ra sings "Happy Birthday", Hoon hands a glass of champagne to Nami. Both appear insane as Nami looks on.

== Cast ==
- Jeon Do-yeon as Eun-yi
- Lee Jung-jae as Hoon
  - Lee stated that Hoon uses "unexpected behavior", as in taking actions that the women around him would not expect him to take, in order to maintain his power in an environment filled with assertive women. Lee added that Hoon's negative reaction to Hae-ra arranging for Eun-yi's abortion without his input as an example of a person being "capable of such selfishness and duplicity, pretending to put someone else's interests first but thinking only of themselves."
- Youn Yuh-jung as Byeong-sik
- Seo Woo as Hae-ra
- Ahn Seo-hyun as Nami
- Park Ji-young as Mi-hee
- Hwang Jung-min as Eun-yi's friend
- Moon So-ri as Obstetrician

Beth Accomando compared several characters to those in The Great Gatsby and stated that they "are only concerned with themselves and the image of perfection they present."

== Production ==
An early draft of the screenplay was written by Kim Soo-hyun, but after director Im Sang-soo had edited the script so heavily that Kim considered it to be entirely Im's own work, she decided to leave the project and publicly expressed her dissatisfaction. Although the film includes some key elements of the original, Kim Ki-young's The Housemaid from 1960, Im has said that he tried to never think of it during the production in order to come up with a modern and original work. One major difference between the versions is that the original film took place in the middle class, while the remake is set in an extreme upper-class environment. Im explains this with South Korea's social structure around 1960, which was a time when the country's middle class started to form and many poor people moved from the countryside to work in the cities: "women became housemaids who served not only for the rich but also the middle class and that issue had served as the basis to Kim Ki-young's work. What I realized upon reworking The Housemaid in 50 years was that there are much more wealthy people now, people who are millionaires. ... I wanted to depict the reality in which housewives from normal families have to undertake hard work too". The film was produced by the Seoul-based company Mirovision.

Im stated that the design of the house reflects a "traditional European lifestyle" enjoyed by wealthy people around the world in the 2010s and that "Myself, I find it questionable that this would be a life they genuinely enjoy or if it's not more for show." In the bird's-eye shots used in the film from time to time, a large ornate chandelier is an observer that looks down on the bourgeois family for which Eun-yi works. It also plays a role in the dramatic and tragic end of the movie's heroine. That chandelier in all its detail is actually a copy of the 2008 work "Song of Dionysus" created by artist Bae Young-whan. The decision to include the chandelier in The Housemaid was quite a deliberate one. At first glance, the light fixture looks like an elegant Art Nouveau craft, but a closer look reveals that its green glass pieces are actually sharp shards from broken wine and soju bottles. In the same sense, the high-class family members in the movie look elegant at a glance but are actually selfish and cruel enough to break their housemaid's heart.

In regards to the initial suicide scene, Im stated that the purpose was to show the effect of suicide in Korea and that the audience is unaware of the circumstances of the first suicide like they become with that of the main character, in that members of the general public learn about suicides and then move on with their lives without considering the circumstances of the suicides.

Im stated that in regards to the birthday party scene, "I wanted audiences to wonder if [Nami] could truly heal from such an event?" He added that a producer of the film had unsuccessfully requested its deletion and that "There has been a lot of controversy surrounding that last scene", but that the film "would have been just so-so" if the final scene was deleted.

There are two scenes within this movie which show a large scar, or burn, on Jeon Do-yeon's upper thigh. Director Im Sang-soo said, "Jeon Do-yeon does, in fact, have a scar there, and before filming began, she mentioned the scar to me because she knew that there were many scenes involving nudity within the film. I didn't have a problem, or filming issues, with it at all, but as shooting progressed, I felt that the scar matched ideas within the film very well, so it is true that I had a couple of scenes specifically focusing on it. We could have erased it with computer graphics, but I talked to Jeon Do-yeon about it and we both agreed that it matched the film so well that it should be kept in."

== Release ==
The film premiered in South Korea on 13 May 2010. Released by Sidus FNH, it opened on 679 screens and topped the box office chart for the first weekend with a revenue corresponding to around $5.7 million. The number of screens had been reduced to 520 after week two, and The Housemaid dropped to second place on the chart, having been overtaken by How to Train Your Dragon. Box Office Mojo reported a total revenue of $14,075,390 in the film's domestic market. The film had 2,289,709 admissions nationwide being the 10th most attended domestic release of the year. The international premiere took place on 14 May in competition at the 2010 Cannes Film Festival. American distribution rights were acquired by IFC Films, who released it in 2011. Latin American distribution rights were acquired by Energia Entusiasta. The film is available in Amazon Prime Video in Latin America.

== Reception ==
Following the screening in Cannes, Maggie Lee of The Hollywood Reporter called the film "a flamingly sexy soap opera whose satire on high society is sometimes as savage as Claude Chabrol's La Cérémonie". However, Lee also found the film to have several prominent flaws: "plot developments are glaringly melodramatic" and "even with Jeon's calibrated performance, Eun-yi's characterization is problematic...[T]he absence in motivation of her behavior does not really convince". Lee Hyo-won of The Korea Times was all praise, saying that Im "brings a sexy, seamlessly quilted film that throbs with intrigue, lively characters and finely crafted melodrama". In 2014, it made Time's list of "Top 12 Female Revenge Movies" along with another South Korean film Lady Vengeance; with the review "the grim, gleaming Housemaid has a silky thread of tension tightening around the viewer's rooting interest, right up to the cutting revenge Eun-yi takes on her torturers."

Beth Accomando of KPBS described the story as "a seductive and disquieting thriller in which overt violence is rare but ruthless manipulation and a callous lack of concern for people are commonplace."

On the review aggregator website Rotten Tomatoes, 69% of 72 critics' reviews are positive. The website's consensus reads: "Im Sang-soo's remake of The Housemaid struggles to escape the shadow of the original, but offers its own unique -- and decidedly sensual -- pleasures." On Metacritic, the film has a weighted average score of 68 out of 100 based on 21 critics, indicating "generally favorable reviews".

== Awards and nominations ==
Year	Award	Category	Recipient	Result
2010	2010 Cannes Film Festival	Palme d'Or	Im Sang-soo	Nominated
2010	Film Fest Gent	Georges Delerue Award	Hong-jip Kim	Won
2010	18th Chunsa Film Art Awards	Best Supporting Actress	Youn Yuh-jung	Won
2010	19th Buil Film Awards	Best Supporting Actress	Youn Yuh-jung	Won
2010	47th Grand Bell Awards	Best Film	The Housemaid	Nominated
2010	47th Grand Bell Awards	Best Director	Im Sang-soo	Nominated
2010	47th Grand Bell Awards	Best Actress	Jeon Do-yeon	Nominated
2010	47th Grand Bell Awards	Best Supporting Actress	Youn Yuh-jung	Won
2010	47th Grand Bell Awards	Best Supporting Actress	Seo Woo	Nominated
2010	47th Grand Bell Awards	Best Costume Design	Choi Se-yeon	Nominated
2010	31st Blue Dragon Film Awards	Best Film	The Housemaid	Nominated
2010	31st Blue Dragon Film Awards	Best Director	Im Sang-soo	Nominated
2010	31st Blue Dragon Film Awards	Best Actress	Jeon Do-yeon	Nominated
2010	31st Blue Dragon Film Awards	Best Supporting Actress	Youn Yuh-jung	Won
2010	31st Blue Dragon Film Awards	Best Art Direction	Lee Ha-jun	Won
2010	Cinemanila International Film Festival	Best Director	Im Sang-soo	Won
2010	Cinemanila International Film Festival	Best Supporting Actress	Youn Yuh-jung	Won
2010	8th Korean Film Awards	Best Actress	Jeon Do-yeon	Nominated
2010	8th Korean Film Awards	Best Supporting Actress	Youn Yuh-jung	Won
2010	8th Korean Film Awards	Best Supporting Actress	Seo Woo	Nominated
2010	8th Korean Film Awards	Best Art Direction	Lee Ha-jun	Nominated
2010	8th Korean Film Awards	Best Sound Effects	Lee Sang-joon, Kim Suk-won, Park Joo-kang	Nominated
2010	8th Korean Film Awards	Best Music	Kim Hong-jib	Nominated
2010	11th Busan Film Critics Awards	Best Actress	Youn Yuh-jung	Won
2011	5th Asian Film Awards	Best Actress	Jeon Do-yeon	Nominated
2011	5th Asian Film Awards	People's Choice for Favorite Actress	Jeon Do-yeon	Won
2011	5th Asian Film Awards	Best Supporting Actress	Youn Yuh-jung	Won
2011	5th Asian Film Awards	Best Costume Design	Choi Se-yeon	Nominated
2011	31st Fantasporto Director's Week	Manoel de Oliveira Award for Best Film	The Housemaid	Won
2011	31st Fantasporto Director's Week	Best Actor	Lee Jung-jae	Won
2011	31st Fantasporto Director's Week	Best Actress	Jeon Do-yeon	Won
2011	2nd Seoul Art and Culture Awards	Best Actress	Jeon Do-yeon	Won
2011	8th Max Movie Awards	Best Actress	Youn Yuh-jung	Nominated
2011	8th Max Movie Awards	Best Supporting Actress	Youn Yuh-jung	Won

== See also ==
- Cinema of South Korea
- List of South Korean films of 2010
