= Seo Young-hee =

South Korean actress (born 1979)

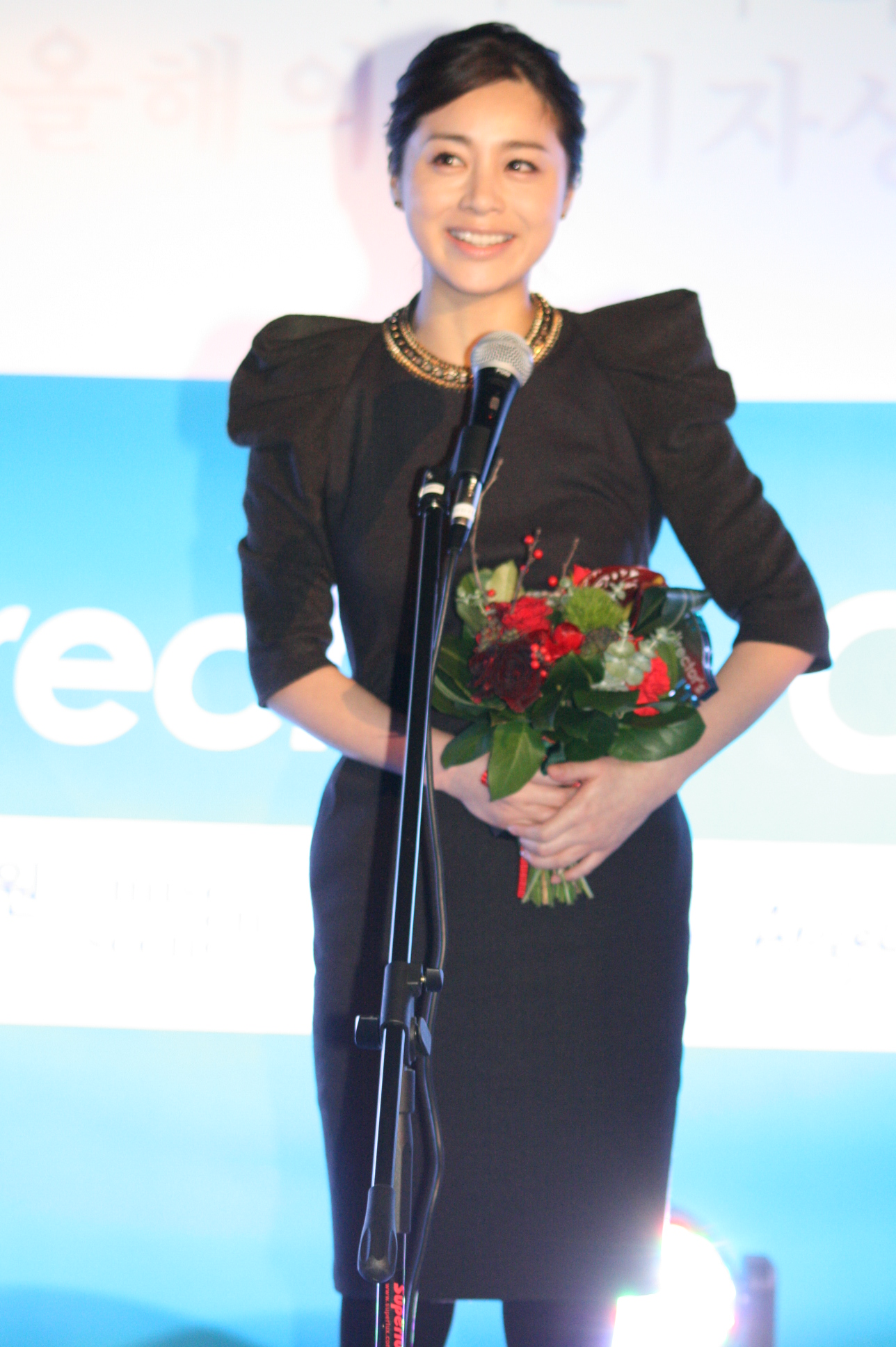
- Seo at the 2010 Director's Cut Awards
- Born: June 13, 1979 (age 47); Seoul, South Korea
- Education: Dongguk University - Theatre
- Occupation: Actress
- Years active: 1999–present
- Agent: Screening ENT
- Spouse: Unknown (m. 2011)

Korean name
- Hangul: 서영희
- RR: Seo Yeonghui
- MR: Sŏ Yŏnghŭi

Seo Young-hee (Korean: 서영희; born June 13, 1979) is a South Korean actress. She is best known for her supporting role in thriller The Chaser (2008) and her award-winning lead role in horror film Bedevilled (2010).

== Filmography ==
=== Film ===
Year	Title	Role
1998	Bye June	Nurse #2
2003	The Classic	Na Na-hee
2003	Jealousy Is My Middle Name	Ahn Hye-ok
2004	Liar	Yang Myung-sun
2005	Mapado	Jang Ggeut-soon
2005	All for Love	Ha Seon-ae
2006	Now and Forever	Soo-jin
2006	To Sir, with Love	Yoo Jung-won/Nam Mi-ja
2006	Moodori	Yang Mi-kyung
2007	Mission Possible: Kidnapping Granny K	Seo Jong-ran (cameo)
2007	Shadows in the Palace	Wol-ryung
2008	The Chaser	Kim Mi-jin
2008	Antique	Jin-hyuk's 3rd girlfriend
2009	Fortune Salon	Ji-hye
2010	Bedevilled	Kim Bok-nam
2011	The Last Blossom	Shin Seon-ae
2012	Circle of Crime - Director's Cut	Hong Soo-min
2013	Rough Play	Oh Yeon-hee
2015	Madonna	Moon Hye-rim
2015	The Accidental Detective	Mi-ok
2017	The Accidental Detective 2: In Action	Lee Mi-ok
2018	The Wrath	Lady Shin
2020	The Night of Undying Humans	Sera
2022	Air Murder	Han Gil-joo
2022	The Contorted House	Myung-hye
2022	Midnight Horror: Six Nights – Segment: Goo Hara Who Can Do	Jin-kyung
TBA	The Sound of Breath	Ok-ran

=== Television series ===
Year	Title	Role	Notes/Ref.
2004	Exciting Change		
2004	Tropical Nights in December	Park Myung-sook	
2005	Drama City: "No One Loves Me"		one act-drama
2005	A Farewell to Sorrow	Kim Min-joo	
2005	HDTV Literature: "The Outdoor Lamp"	Jae-hee	
2006	MBC Best Theater: "Who Lives There?"		one act-drama
2007	Mermaid Story	Nam Soo-in	
2007	Dal-ja's Spring	Jang Soo-jin	
2007	Daughters-in-Law	Lee Bok-nam	
2008	Here He Comes	Lee Young-hee	
2009	Queen Seondeok	So-hwa	
2011	A Thousand Kisses	Woo Joo-young	
2012	Ji Woon-soo's Stroke of Luck	Lee Eun-hee	
2013	Thrice Married Woman	Park Joo-ha	
2018	Secret Mother	Kang Hye-kyung	
2019	Trap	Shin Yeon-soo	
2019	Nokdu Flower	Yoo-Wol	
2021	Joseon Exorcist	Queen Wongyeong	
2022	O'PENing: "The Apartment Is Beautiful"	Moon Se-yeon	one act-drama
2023	Pale Moon	Kang Seon-yeong	
2023	The Escape of the Seven	Park Nan-young	
2023	Twinkling Watermelon	adult Yoon Cheong-ah	
2024–2025	Who Is She	Ban Ji-sook	
2025	Way Back Love	Kim Jung-sook	
2026	Teach You a Lesson	Jung Hyun-min's mother	

=== Web series ===
Year	Title	Role	Ref.
2021	Shall We Have A Cup of Coffee?	Kim Joo-hee	

=== Music video appearances ===
Year	Song title	Artist
2008	"Shout With Your Heart"	Monday Kiz

== Theater ==
Year	Title	Role	Ref.
1999	Moskito	Nalnari	
2000	A Dangerous Star Like That	Girl	
2001	Statement	Yu-ri	
2023	The Dressing Room	B	

== Awards and nominations ==
Year	Award	Category	Nominated work	Result
2005	13th Chunsa Film Art Awards	Best New Actress	All for Love	Won
2005	26th Blue Dragon Film Awards	Best Supporting Actress	All for Love	Nominated
2006	25th MBC Drama Awards	Best Actress in a One-Act/Special Drama	그집엔 누가사나요?	Won
2007	21st KBS Drama Awards	Best New Actress	Daughters-in-Law	Nominated
2007	21st KBS Drama Awards	Best Supporting Actress	Daughters-in-Law	Nominated
2008	12th Puchon International Fantastic Film Festival	Best Actress	The Chaser	Won
2008	45th Grand Bell Awards	Best Supporting Actress	The Chaser	Nominated
2008	17th Buil Film Awards	Best Supporting Actress	Shadows in the Palace	Nominated
2008	29th Blue Dragon Film Awards	Best Supporting Actress	The Chaser	Nominated
2008	7th Korean Film Awards	Best Supporting Actress	The Chaser	Nominated
2008	8th MBC Entertainment Awards	Popularity Award, Actress in a Sitcom/Comedy	Here He Comes	Won
2009	28th MBC Drama Awards	Golden Acting Award, Supporting Actress	Queen Seondeok	Won
2010	14th Puchon International Fantastic Film Festival	Best Actress	Bedevilled	Won
2010	6th Fantastic Fest	Best Actress	Bedevilled	Won
2010	47th Grand Bell Awards	Best Actress	Bedevilled	Nominated
2010	30th Korean Association of Film Critics Awards	Best Actress	Bedevilled	Won
2010	11th Korea Visual Arts Festival	Photogenic Award, Actress	Bedevilled	Won
2010	4th Korea Sharing Awards	Chairman's Award, Actress	Bedevilled	Won
2010	31st Blue Dragon Film Awards	Best Actress	Bedevilled	Nominated
2010	8th Korean Film Awards	Best Actress	Bedevilled	Won
2010	11th Women in Film Korea Awards	Best Actress	Bedevilled	Won
2010	13th Director's Cut Awards	Best Actress	Bedevilled	Won
2011	2nd KOFRA Film Awards	Best Actress	Bedevilled	Won
2011	31st Fantasporto Oporto International Film Festival	Best Actress	Bedevilled	Won
2011	47th Paeksang Arts Awards	Best Actress	Bedevilled	Nominated
2011	30th MBC Drama Awards	Top Excellence Award, Actress in a Serial Drama	A Thousand Kisses	Nominated
