= Mr. XXX-Kisser =

- Theatrical release poster
- Directed by: Jung Seung-gu
- Screenplay by: Kim Sun-young
- Produced by: Kim Jin-Young, Choi Tae-Young
- Starring: Song Sae-byeok; Sung Dong-il
- Distributed by: Lotte Entertainment
- Release date: 2 March 2012
- Running time: 118 minutes
- Country: South Korea
- Language: Korean

The Suck Up Project: Mr. XXX-Kisser (also known as King of Abu) (Korean: 아부의 왕; RR: Abuui wang) is a 2012 South Korean comedy directed by Jung Seung-gu and starring Song Sae-byeok and Sung Dong-il. The film is a satire on Korean corporate culture.

== Plot ==
Dong-sik (Song) is an employee at a large insurance company. He works hard and does everything by the book, in contrast to his colleagues, who are more interested in schmoozing their way into promotions. Dong-sik's naïve sense of ethics gets him into trouble in both his professional and private life. When he gets demoted to insurance salesman, Dong-sik struggles due to his tactlessness and lack of charm. He then discovers that his mother borrowed money from a loan shark to pay for his father's promotion to Principal at a local school. In order to improve his sales and pay back the loan sharks, Dong-sik seeks help from legendary silver-tongued master Hyeo Go-soo (Sung), whose book about wooing and persuading others is deeply prized among his colleagues. Go-soo takes Dong-sik on as an apprentice, with Dong-sik desperately following his teachings in order to improve his sales.

== Cast ==
- Song Sae-byeok as Dong-sik
- Sung Dong-il as Go-soo
- Kim Sung-ryung as Ye-ji
- Ko Chang-seok as Seong-cheol
- Kim Min-jae as Seong-cheol's second
- Lee Byung-joon as President Lee
- Cha Seung-won as himself
- Park Bo-kyung as Middle aged woman
- Lee Cheol-min as Director Son

== Release & Reception ==
The film was released on March 2, 2012, and grossed $3 million at the South Korean box office. It received generally positive reviews and was described by The Korea Times and The Chosun Ilbo as the strongest South Korean comedy of the year.
