= Song Sae-byeok =

South Korean actor

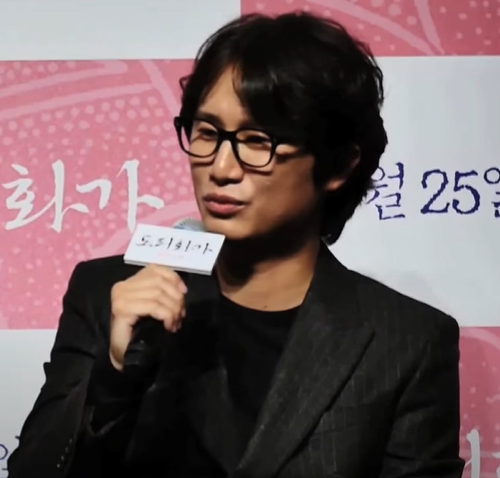
- Song in 2015
- Born: December 26, 1979 (age 46); Gunsan, South Korea
- Education: Kunsan National University – Philosophy
- Occupation: Actor
- Years active: 1998–present
- Agent: Studio Santa Claus Entertainment

Korean name
- Hangul: 송새벽
- RR: Song Saebyeok
- MR: Song Saebyŏk

Song Sae-byeok (born December 25, 1979) is a South Korean actor. After gaining attention as a supporting actor in The Servant (2010), Song played the leading roles in the comedies Meet the In-Laws (2011) and The Suck Up Project: Mr. XXX-Kisser (2012).

== Filmography ==
=== Film ===
Year	Title	Role	Notes	Ref.
2005	Confession	Ki-young	short film	
2009	Mother	Sepak takraw detective		
2010	The Servant	Byeon Hak-do		
2010	Troubleshooter	Oh Jong-kyu		
2010	Cyrano Agency	Kim Hyeon-gon		
2010	The Unjust	Cheol-gi's brother-in-law		
2011	Meet the In-Laws	Jang Hyun-joon		
2011	Sector 7	Go Jong-yoon		
2011	Ordinary Days	Han-chul	segment: "BETWEEN"	
2012	The Suck Up Project: Mr. XXX-Kisser	Oh Dong-sik		
2012	Doomsday Book	Hwan, Min-seo's uncle	segment "Happy Birthday"	
2012	Tone-deaf Clinic	Hyung-ja's husband	Cameo	
2014	The Huntresses	Raiding constable Song		
2014	A Girl at My Door	Park Yong-ha		
2014	My Ordinary Love Story	Hyun-suk		
2014	A Dynamite Family	Dong-soo		
2015	The Sound of a Flower	Kim Se-jong		
2018	Seven Years of Night	Seung-hwan		
2019	Real Culprit			
2022	Special Delivery	Kyung-pil		
2022	Broker	Kindergarten Director	Special appearance	
2022	Come Back Home	Ki Se		
2023	The Bright Girl	Wan-gyu		
2026	Dora	Yeon-su		
TBA	Weekend Prince			

=== Television series ===
Year	Title	Role	Ref.
2018	My Mister	Park Ki-hoon	
2019	Possessed	Kang Pil-sung	

== Theater ==
Year	Title	Role	Reprised
	Life Is Lighting Up One Last Cigarette		
	Your Friend		
	Morning Sunlight		
	Mad Hamlet		
	A Bird Returning Home Without Its Wings		
	Two Friends		
	The Bright Moon Floods These Empty Hills		
	My Wife's Husband		
	Yi		
2006	I Love You		
2007	1980 Incident	Ji-hwan	
2007	The Sea Fog	Dong-sik	2008, 2009, 2011
2009	Come and See Me	Detective Kim	

== Awards and nominations ==
Year	Award	Category	Nominated work	Result
2010	19th Buil Film Awards	Best New Actor	The Servant	Won
2010	30th Korean Association of Film Critics Awards	Best New Actor	The Servant	Won
2010	47th Grand Bell Awards	Best New Actor	Troubleshooter	Nominated
2010	47th Grand Bell Awards	Best Supporting Actor	The Servant	Won
2010	31st Blue Dragon Film Awards	Best New Actor	The Servant	Nominated
2010	8th Korean Film Awards	Best New Actor	The Servant	Won
2010	8th Korean Film Awards	Best Supporting Actor	The Servant	Nominated
2010	6th University Film Festival of Korea	Best New Actor	The Servant	Won
2010	13th Director's Cut Awards	Best New Actor	The Servant	Won
2011	2nd KOFRA Film Awards	Discovery Award	The Servant	Won
2011	8th Max Movie Awards	Best Supporting Actor	The Servant	Won
2011	47th Baeksang Arts Awards	Best New Actor	The Servant	Nominated
2014	23rd Buil Film Awards	Best Supporting Actor	A Girl at My Door	Nominated
2015	2nd Wildflower Film Awards	Best Actor	A Girl at My Door	Nominated
2015	51st Baeksang Arts Awards	Best Supporting Actor	A Girl at My Door	Nominated
2018	55th Grand Bell Awards	Best Supporting Actor	Seven Years of Night	Nominated
