= Kang Ye-won =

South Korean actress (born 1979)

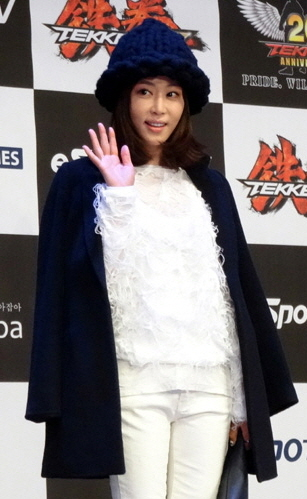
- Kang in 2015
- Born: Kim Ji-eun; March 15, 1979 (age 47); Daegu, South Korea
- Education: Hanyang University
- Occupation: Actress
- Years active: 2000–present
- Agent: Fantagio

Korean name
- Hangul: 김지은
- RR: Gim Jieun
- MR: Kim Chiŭn

Stage name
- Hangul: 강예원
- Hanja: 强藝元
- RR: Gang Yewon
- MR: Kang Yewŏn

Kang Ye-won (Korean: 강예원; born March 15, 1979), birth name Kim Ji-eun (김지은), is a South Korean actress. She is best known for her roles in Tidal Wave, Harmony, and Quick.

== Filmography ==
=== Film ===
Year	Title	Role	Ref.
2002	Sex of Magic	Han Ji-hye	
2002	Addicted	Young-eun	
2005	The Red Shoes	Keiko/Tae-Su(grown up)	
2007	Miracle on 1st Street	Seon-joo	
2009	Tidal Wave	Kim Hee-mi	
2010	Harmony	Kang Yoo-mi	
2010	Hello Ghost	Jung Yeon-soo	
2011	Quick	Ah-rom	
2012	Ghost Sweepers	Chan-young	
2014	The Huntresses	Hong-dan	
2014	My Ordinary Love Story	Park Eun-jin	
2015	Love Clinic	Gil Shin-Seol	
2016	El Condor Pasa	Soo-ha	
2016	Insane	Kang Soo-ah	
2016	Trick	Choi Young-ae	
2017	Part-Time Spy	Jang Young-shil	
2019	Watching	Yeong-woo	
2019	The Bad Guys: Reign of Chaos	Yoo Mi-young	

=== Television series ===
Year	Title	Role	Ref.
2001	Honey Honey	Ji-eun	
2002	Who's My Love	Joo-mi	
2002	Five Brothers and Sisters	Han Sun-hee (young)	
2003	Long Live Love	Lee Ji-hye	
2004	My 19 Year Old Sister-in-Law		
2012	One Thousandth Man	Koo Mi-jin	
2014	Bad Guys	Yoo Mi-young	
2016	Becky's Back	Yang Baek-hee (Becky)	
2017	Man Who Dies to Live	Lee Ji-young "A"	
2018	Drama Stage: "Fighter Choi Kang-Soon"	Choi Kang-soon	
2021	The One and Only	Kang Se-yeon	

=== Variety show ===
Year	Title	Notes	Ref.
2015	Real Men: Female Soldier Special – Season 1	Cast member (Edition 2)	
2015	We Got Married – Season 4	Cast member with Oh Min-suk (ep.146-180)	
2016	Scene Stealer	Cast member	
2017	Sister's Slam Dunk – Season 2	Cast member	
2018	Pets GO! Doggy Trip	Cast member	

=== Musicals ===
Year	Title	Role	Ref.
2000	Carmen (Korean adaptation)	Carmen	

== Awards and nominations ==
Year	Award	Category	Nominated work	Result	Ref.
2007	15th Chunsa Film Art Awards	Best New Actress	Miracle on 1st Street	Nominated	
2009	30th Blue Dragon Film Awards	Best New Actress	Haeundae	Nominated	
2010	46th Baeksang Arts Awards	Best New Actress (Film)	Harmony	Nominated	
2010	18th Chunsa Film Art Awards	Best New Actress	Harmony	Won	
2010	47th Grand Bell Awards	Best Supporting Actress	Harmony	Nominated	
2010	47th Grand Bell Awards	Best New Actress	Harmony	Nominated	
2010	31st Blue Dragon Film Awards	Best Supporting Actress	Harmony	Nominated	
2015	MBC Entertainment Awards	Top Excellence Award for Variety Show	We Got Married	Nominated	
2015	MBC Entertainment Awards	Popularity Award for Variety Show	We Got Married	Won	
2015	MBC Entertainment Awards	Best Couple Award with Oh Min-suk	We Got Married	Nominated	
2016	53rd Grand Bell Awards	Best Actress	Insane	Nominated	
2016	Korea Film Actors Association Awards	Popularity Award	Insane	Won	
2016	KBS Drama Awards	Best Actress in a One-Act Drama	Becky's Back	Won	
2017	10th Korea Drama Awards	Top Excellence Award, Actress	Man Who Dies to Live	Nominated	
2017	MBC Drama Awards	Top Excellence Award, Actress in a Miniseries	Man Who Dies to Live	Nominated	

== Personal life and health ==
She was a classically trained opera singer, and graduated from Hanyang University with Bachelor of Music with vocal major. However, she lost confidence to sing after suffering from vocal nodules.

She is a devout Christian and it was also revealed on Unnie's Slam Dunk that she is also a painter. She had hosted exhibitions since 2015.

In October 2021, she contracted COVID-19 despite being fully vaccinated.
