= Korean Film Awards =

South Korean awards ceremony

- Hangul: 대한민국 영화대상
- Hanja: 大韓民國 映畫大賞
- RR: Daehanminguk yeonghwadaesang
- MR: Taehanmin'guk yŏnghwadaesang
- Awarded for: Excellence in film making
- Country: South Korea
- Presented by: Munhwa Broadcasting Corporation
- First award: 2002
- Website: Official website

The Korean Film Awards (Korean: 대한민국 영화대상) was a South Korean film awards ceremony hosted by the broadcasting network MBC from 2002 to 2010.

== History ==
Originally named the MBC Film Awards, the ceremony was first established in 2002. It was renamed the Korean Film Awards in 2003. Votes were determined from a jury of 500 film professionals and 500 viewers selected through the internet, using a 7:3 ratio.

In 2009, failure to secure sponsors during the global economic recession resulted in the cancellation of that year's ceremony. It resumed in 2010, with Hyundai Motor Company as the main sponsor. But persistent financial difficulties regarding the production costs led MBC to abolish the awards in 2011.

== Categories ==
- Best Film
- Best Director
- Best Screenplay
- Best Actor
- Best Actress
- Best Supporting Actor
- Best Supporting Actress
- Best New Director
- Best New Actor
- Best New Actress
- Best Cinematography
- Best Editing
- Best Art Direction
- Best Lighting
- Best Music
- Best Visual Effects
- Best Sound
- Best Short Film
- Lifetime Achievement Award

== Best Film ==
#	Year	Film	Director
1st	2002	Oasis	Lee Chang-dong
2nd	2003	Memories of Murder	Bong Joon-ho
3rd	2004	Oldboy	Park Chan-wook
4th	2005	Welcome to Dongmakgol	Park Kwang-hyun
5th	2006	The Host	Bong Joon-ho
6th	2007	Secret Sunshine	Lee Chang-dong
7th	2008	The Chaser	Na Hong-jin
8th	2010	Poetry	Lee Chang-dong

== Best Director ==
#	Year	Director	Film
1st	2002	Lee Chang-dong	Oasis
2nd	2003	Bong Joon-ho	Memories of Murder
3rd	2004	Park Chan-wook	Oldboy
4th	2005	Park Kwang-hyun	Welcome to Dongmakgol
5th	2006	Bong Joon-ho	The Host
6th	2007	Lee Chang-dong	Secret Sunshine
7th	2008	Na Hong-jin	The Chaser
8th	2010	Lee Chang-dong	Poetry

== Best Screenplay ==
#	Year	Screenwriter	Film
1st	2002	Lee Chang-dong	Oasis
2nd	2003	Bong Joon-ho, Shim Sung-bo	Memories of Murder
3rd	2004	Choi Dong-hoon	The Big Swindle
4th	2005	Jang Jin, Park Kwang-hyun, Kim Joong	Welcome to Dongmakgol
5th	2006	Son Jae-gon	My Scary Girl
6th	2007	Choi Dong-hoon	Tazza: The High Rollers
7th	2008	Na Hong-jin	The Chaser
8th	2010	Lee Chang-dong	Poetry

== Best Actor ==
#	Year	Actor	Film
1st	2002	Sul Kyung-gu	Oasis
2nd	2003	Song Kang-ho	Memories of Murder
3rd	2004	Choi Min-sik	Oldboy
4th	2005	Hwang Jung-min	You Are My Sunshine
5th	2006	Jo In-sung	A Dirty Carnival
6th	2007	Song Kang-ho	Secret Sunshine
7th	2008	Kim Yoon-seok	The Chaser
8th	2010	Won Bin	The Man from Nowhere

== Best Actress ==
#	Year	Actress	Film
1st	2002	Moon So-ri	Oasis
2nd	2003	Moon So-ri	A Good Lawyer's Wife
3rd	2004	Jeon Do-yeon	My Mother, the Mermaid
4th	2005	Jeon Do-yeon	You Are My Sunshine
5th	2006	Jang Jin-young	Between Love and Hate
6th	2007	Jeon Do-yeon	Secret Sunshine
7th	2008	Gong Hyo-jin	Crush and Blush
8th	2010	Seo Young-hee	Bedevilled

== Best Supporting Actor ==
#	Year	Actor	Film
1st	2002	Hwang Jung-min	Waikiki Brothers
2nd	2003	Baek Yoon-sik	Save the Green Planet!
3rd	2004	Lee Moon-sik	The Big Swindle
4th	2005	Hwang Jung-min	A Bittersweet Life
5th	2006	Lee Beom-soo	The City of Violence
6th	2007	Sung Ji-ru	Paradise Murdered
7th	2008	Park Hee-soon	Seven Days
8th	2010	Yoo Hae-jin	Moss

== Best Supporting Actress ==
#	Year	Actress	Film
1st	2002	Oh Ji-hye	Waikiki Brothers
2nd	2003	Youn Yuh-jung	A Good Lawyer's Wife
3rd	2004	Go Doo-shim	My Mother, the Mermaid
4th	2005	Kang Hye-jung	Welcome to Dongmakgol
5th	2006	Choo Ja-hyun	Bloody Tie
6th	2007	Gong Hyo-jin	Happiness
7th	2008	Kim Ji-young	Forever the Moment
8th	2010	Youn Yuh-jung	The Housemaid

== Best New Director ==
#	Year	Director	Film
1st	2002	Jeong Jae-eun	Take Care of My Cat
2nd	2003	Jang Joon-hwan	Save the Green Planet!
3rd	2004	Choi Dong-hoon	The Big Swindle
4th	2005	Park Kwang-hyun	Welcome to Dongmakgol
5th	2006	Lee Hae-young, Lee Hae-jun	Like a Virgin
6th	2007	Kim Mee-jung	Shadows in the Palace
7th	2008	Na Hong-jin	The Chaser
8th	2010	Jang Cheol-soo	Bedevilled

== Best New Actor ==
#	Year	Actor	Film
1st	2002	Kam Woo-sung	Marriage Is a Crazy Thing
2nd	2003	Park Hae-il	Jealousy Is My Middle Name
3rd	2004	Gang Dong-won	Temptation of Wolves
4th	2005	Park Gun-hyung	Innocent Steps
5th	2006	Lee Joon-gi	King and the Clown
6th	2007	Daniel Henney	My Father
7th	2008	Kang Ji-hwan	Rough Cut
8th	2010	Song Sae-byeok	The Servant

== Best New Actress ==
#	Year	Actress	Film
1st	2002	Moon So-ri	Oasis
2nd	2003	Im Soo-jung	A Tale of Two Sisters
3rd	2004	Soo Ae	A Family
4th	2005	Kim Ji-soo	This Charming Girl
5th	2006	Choo Ja-hyun	Bloody Tie
6th	2007	Song Hye-kyo	Hwang Jin-yi
7th	2008	Seo Woo	Crush and Blush
8th	2010	Kim Sae-ron	The Man from Nowhere

== Best cinematography ==
#	Year	Cinematographer	Film
1st	2002	Kim Byung-il	Sympathy for Mr. Vengeance
2nd	2003	Kim Hyung-koo	Memories of Murder
3rd	2004	Hong Kyung-pyo	Taegukgi
4th	2005	Hwang Ki-seok	Duelist
5th	2006	Kim Hyung-koo	The Host
6th	2007	Hong Kyung-pyo	M
7th	2008	Lee Mo-gae	The Good, the Bad, the Weird
8th	2010	Lee Tae-yoon	The Man from Nowhere

== Best Editing ==
#	Year	Editor	Film
1st	2002	Kim Sang-bum	Sympathy for Mr. Vengeance
2nd	2003	Kim Sun-min	Memories of Murder
3rd	2004	Shin Min-kyung	The Big Swindle
4th	2005	Moon In-dae	All for Love
5th	2006	Park Gok-ji, Jung Jin-hee	A Dirty Carnival
6th	2007	Shin Min-kyung	Tazza: The High Rollers
7th	2008	Kim Sun-min	The Chaser
8th	2010	Kim Sang-bum, Kim Jae-bum	The Man from Nowhere

== Best Art Direction ==
#	Year	Art director	Film
1st	2002	Jang Geun-young	Volcano High
2nd	2003	Cho Geun-hyun	A Tale of Two Sisters
3rd	2004	Jung Ku-ho	Untold Scandal
4th	2005	Min Eon-ok	Blood Rain
5th	2006	Cho Geun-hyun	Forbidden Quest
6th	2007	Yoo Joo-ho, Yoon Sang-yoon	M
7th	2008	Cho Hwa-sung	The Good, the Bad, the Weird
8th	2010	Park Il-hyun	The Servant

== Best Lighting ==
#	Year	Lighting designer	Film
1st	2002	Park Hyun-won	Sympathy for Mr. Vengeance
2nd	2003	Oh Seung-chul	A Tale of Two Sisters
3rd	2004	Park Hyun-won	Oldboy
4th	2005	Shin Kyung-man	Duelist
5th	2006	Lee Kang-san, Jung Young-min	The Host
6th	2007	Choi Chul-soo	M
7th	2008	Lee Cheol-oh	The Chaser
8th	2010	Lee Cheol-oh	The Man from Nowhere

== Best Visual Effects ==
#	Year	Visual effects supervisor	Film
1st	2002	Jang Seong-ho	Volcano High
2nd	2003	Independence	Wonderful Days
3rd	2004	Jeong Do-an	Taegukgi
4th	2005	Shin Jae-ho	Blood Rain
5th	2006	The Orphanage, EON	The Host
6th	2007	Young-gu Art	D-War
7th	2008	Jung Doo-hong, Ji Joong-hyun, Heo Myung-haeng	The Good, the Bad, the Weird
8th	2010	Park Jung-ryul	The Man from Nowhere

== Best Music ==
#	Year	Composer	Film
1st	2002	Lee Byung-woo	My Beautiful Girl, Mari
2nd	2003	Jo Yeong-wook	The Classic
3rd	2004	Jo Yeong-wook, Shim Hyun-jung, Choi Seung-hyun, Lee Ji-soo	Oldboy
4th	2005	Joe Hisaishi	Welcome to Dongmakgol
5th	2006	Lee Byung-woo	For Horowitz
6th	2007	Bang Jun-seok	Radio Star
7th	2008	Bang Jun-seok	Go Go 70s
8th	2010	Shim Hyun-jung	The Man from Nowhere

== Best Sound ==
#	Year	Sound designer	Film
1st	2002	Live Tone	Volcano High
2nd	2003	Choi Tae-young, Kang Kyung-han	A Tale of Two Sisters
3rd	2004	Kim Suk-won	Taegukgi
4th	2005	Kim Suk-won, Kim Chang-seop	Blood Rain
5th	2006	Choi Tae-young	The Host
6th	2007	Kim Suk-won, Kim Chang-seop, Lee Tae-gyu	Voice of a Murderer
7th	2008	Kim Kyung-tae, Choi Tae-young	The Good, the Bad, the Weird
8th	2010	Gong Tae-won, Jo Min-ho	Midnight FM

== Best Short Film ==
#	Year	Director	Film
1st	2002	His Truth Is Marching On	Shin Jae-in
2nd	2003	Bread and Milk	Won Shin-yun
3rd	2004	—N/a	—N/a
4th	2005	Garivegas	Kim Sun-min
5th	2006	War Movie	Park Dong-hoon
6th	2007	The Ten-minute Break	Lee Seong-tae
7th	2008	Pig and Shakespeare	Kim Geon
8th	2010	—N/a	—N/a

== Lifetime achievement award ==
#	Year	Recipient	Notes
1st	2002	Jung Il-sung	Cinematographer
2nd	2003	Shin Sang-ok	Director
3rd	2004	Hwang Jeong-sun	Actress
4th	2005	Kim Dong-ho	Executive director of the Busan International Film Festival
5th	2006	Choi Eun-hee	Actress
6th	2007	Yu Hyun-mok	Director
7th	2008	Shin Young-kyun	Actor
8th	2010	Shin Seong-il	Actor, director
