= The Man from Nowhere (2010 film) =

2010 South Korean action thriller film

- Theatrical release poster
- Hangul: 아저씨
- RR: Ajeossi
- MR: Ajŏssi
- Directed by: Lee Jeong-beom
- Written by: Lee Jeong-beom
- Produced by: Lee Tae-heon
- Starring: Won Bin; Kim Sae-ron
- Cinematography: Lee Tae-yoon
- Edited by: Kim Sang-bum
- Music by: Shim Hyun-jung
- Distributed by: CJ Entertainment
- Release date: August 4, 2010
- Running time: 119 minutes
- Country: South Korea
- Language: Korean
- Box office: US$43 million

The Man from Nowhere (Korean: 아저씨; RR: Ajeossi; lit. Mister) is a 2010 South Korean neo-noir action-thriller film starring Won Bin and written and directed by Lee Jeong-beom. In the film, a mysterious man embarks on a bloody rampage when his young neighbor is kidnapped.

The Man from Nowhere was the highest-grossing film in South Korea in 2010. It was released in the United States and Canada on October 1, 2010. The film also marked Won's final appearance as an actor to date.

== Plot ==
Cha Tae-sik is a quiet man running a pawnshop. His only friend is So-mi, a little girl living next door. So-mi's mother Hyo-jeong is a go-go dancer and opium addict. Instructed by her lover, Hyo-jeong steals a large pack of opium being sold at the bar where she works and hides it in a camera bag, which she pawns to Tae-sik for safekeeping. Drug lord Oh Myung-gyu tasks his subordinate brothers, Man-seok and Jong-seok, with retrieving the opium. Jong-seok locates Hyo-jeong and tortures her in front of So-mi until she reveals the location of the drugs.

Jong-seok's lackeys Du-chi and Bear go to the pawnshop, but Tae-sik easily overpowers them. Holding So-mi hostage, Jong-seok forces Tae-sik to deliver the opium to Myung-gyu. Man-seok, tired of working for his brother, informs the police, but Myung-gyu evades arrest. Tae-sik is arrested after discovering Hyo-jeong's body, with her organs harvested, in the trunk of his car. Tae-sik escapes from the police station, alarming them with his display of combat skills. Upon further investigation, the officers discover that Tae-sik was a former covert operative for South Korean Army Intelligence, but retired after an assassin killed his pregnant wife.

The brothers track down Hyo-jeong's lover and kill him, while the brothers' bodyguard Ramrowan kills Myung-gyu, thus allowing the brothers to take over his operations. Following a lead from the burner phone Jong-seok gave him, Tae-sik tracks Du-chi to a nightclub. As Tae-sik asks about the brothers, Ramrowan walks in and shoots at them, killing Du-chi and wounding Tae-sik. Tae-sik escapes and finds his former partner, who gives Tae-sik medical care and helps him acquire a gun. Tae-sik goes back to the city and discovers a drug manufacturing plant; in the process of destroying it, he kills Jong-seok and frees the enslaved child workers.

Tae-sik confronts Man-seok's gang at his condominium. Claiming that he had So-mi's eyes harvested, Man-seok shows Tae-sik a container with two preserved eyeballs. Enraged, Tae-sik brutally kills the gang members, including Ramrowan and Man-seok. As Tae-sik prepares to commit suicide out of grief, a dirty but unharmed So-mi finds him. Ramrowan, who took pity on her because she had been kind to him, had spared her life—the eyes in the container belonged to the gangsters' surgeon. The police allow Tae-sik and So-mi to ride together after Tae-sik's arrest. When So-mi falls asleep, Tae-sik asks them to stop at a small convenience store where he buys a backpack along with other school supplies. Tae-sik tells So-mi that she is going to be on her own as the police have to take him away. Before leaving, Tae-sik asks her for a hug and breaks down in tears as they embrace.

== Cast ==
- Won Bin as Cha Tae-sik
- Kim Sae-ron as So-mi
- Kim Hee-won as Man-seok
- Kim Sung-oh as Jong-seok, Man-seok's brother
- Kim Tae-hoon as Detective Kim Chi-gon
- Thanayong Wongtrakunl as Lum Ramrowan
- Lee Do-gyeom as Child at workplace
- Kim Hyo-seo as Hyo-jeong, So-mi's mother
- Lee Jong-yi as Detective No
- Song Young-chang as Oh Myung-gyu
- Jo Seok-hyuon as Moon Dal-seo
- Jo Jae-yoon as Jang Doo-sik
- Hong So-hee as Yeon-soo
- Hwang Min-ho as Nam Sung-Sik
- Kwak Byung-Kyu as Detective Kim
- Lee Jae-won as Du-chi

== Release ==
During its August 6–8 opening weekend, the film recorded 712,840 admissions, taking the number 1 spot on the box office charts for five weeks straight. It had sold a total of 6,228,300 tickets when it finished its theatrical run on November 17, 2010. The film grossed a total of US$42,484,155 in South Korea. On October 1, 2010 CJ Entertainment gave the film a limited theatrical release to North American theaters where it grossed US$35,751 in 1 theater its opening weekend. After widening the release up to 19 theaters, the film grossed US$528,175 in the U.S. and Canada.

== Reception ==
On the review aggregator website Rotten Tomatoes, 100% of 8 critics' reviews are positive, with an average rating of 6.3/10. Russell Edwards of Variety wrote "Brutal violence dominates the dynamic Korean thriller The Man From Nowhere. Local heartthrob Won Bin (Mother, Tae Guk Gui) transforms himself into an action hero in writer-helmer Lee Jeong-beom's swift and blood-soaked yarn, about a mystery man who gets caught up in a gang war while trying to protect a child, recalling Luc Besson's The Professional."

=== Awards and nominations ===
Award	Category	Nominee(s)	Result	Ref.
Asian Film Awards	Best Visual Effects	Park Jung-ryul	Nominated	
Baeksang Arts Awards	Best Actor	Won Bin	Nominated	
Baeksang Arts Awards	Best Director	Lee Jeong-beom	Nominated	
Baeksang Arts Awards	Best Film	The Man from Nowhere	Won	
Baeksang Arts Awards	Best New Actress	Kim Sae-ron	Nominated	
Baeksang Arts Awards	Most Popular Actor	Won Bin	Nominated	
Baeksang Arts Awards	Most Popular Actress	Kim Sae-ron	Nominated	
Beaune International Thriller Film Festival	Grand Prize	The Man from Nowhere	Won	
Blue Dragon Film Awards	Audience Choice Award	The Man from Nowhere	Won	
Blue Dragon Film Awards	Best Actor	Won Bin	Nominated	
Blue Dragon Film Awards	Best Art Direction	Hong-sam Yang	Nominated	
Blue Dragon Film Awards	Best Cinematography	Lee Tae-yoon	Nominated	
Blue Dragon Film Awards	Best Director	Lee Jeong-beom	Nominated	
Blue Dragon Film Awards	Best Film	The Man from Nowhere	Nominated	
Blue Dragon Film Awards	Best Lighting	Lee Cheol-oh	Nominated	
Blue Dragon Film Awards	Best Music	Shim Hyun-jung	Nominated	
Blue Dragon Film Awards	Best Screenplay	Lee Jeong-beom	Nominated	
Blue Dragon Film Awards	Box Office Award	The Man from Nowhere	Won	
Blue Dragon Film Awards	Popular Star Award	Won Bin	Won	
Blue Dragon Film Awards	Technical Award	Park Jung-ryul	Won	
Buil Film Awards	Best Actor	Won Bin	Nominated	
Buil Film Awards	Best Music	Shim Hyun-jung	Won	
Buil Film Awards	Special Award (Buil Independence Judge)	The Man from Nowhere	Won	
Cine21 Awards	Actor of the Year	Won Bin	Won	
Cine21 Awards	Producer of the Year	Lee Tae-heon	Won	
Director's Cut Awards	Best Producer	Lee Tae-heon	Won	
Golden Cinematography Awards	Gold Medal Cinematography	Lee Tae-yoon	Won	
Grand Bell Awards	Best Actor	Won Bin	Won	
Grand Bell Awards	Best Cinematography	Lee Tae-yoon	Nominated	
Grand Bell Awards	Best Director	Lee Jeong-beom	Nominated	
Grand Bell Awards	Best Film	The Man from Nowhere	Nominated	
Grand Bell Awards	Best Editing	Kim Sang-bum, Kim Jae-bum	Won	
Grand Bell Awards	Best Visual Effects	Kim Tae-ui	Won	
Grand Bell Awards	Popularity Award	Won Bin	Won	
KOFRA Film Awards	Best Actor	Won Bin	Won	
Korea International Youth Film Festival	Favorite Actor	Won Bin	Won	
Korean Film Awards	Best Actor	Won Bin	Won	
Korean Film Awards	Best Cinematography	Lee Tae-yoon	Won	
Korean Film Awards	Best Editing	Kim Sang-bum, Kim Jae-bum	Won	
Korean Film Awards	Best Lighting	Lee Cheol-oh	Won	
Korean Film Awards	Best Music	Shim Hyun-jung	Won	
Korean Film Awards	Best New Actress	Kim Sae-ron	Won	
Korean Film Awards	Best Visual Effects	Park Jung-ryul	Won	
Korean Wave Industry Awards	Popular Culture Award (Film section)	The Man from Nowhere	Won	
Max Movie Awards	Best Actor	Won Bin	Won	
Max Movie Awards	Best Director	Lee Jeong-beom	Won	
Max Movie Awards	Best New Actress	Kim Sae-ron	Won	
National Assembly Society of Popular Culture & Media Awards	Movie of the Year	The Man from Nowhere	Won	
Philadelphia Film Festival	Graveyard Shift Special Mention	The Man from Nowhere	Won	
University Film Festival of Korea	Best Actor	Won Bin	Won	
University Film Festival of Korea	Best Cinematography	Lee Tae-yoon	Won	
University Film Festival of Korea	Best Director	Lee Jeong-beom	Won	
University Film Festival of Korea	Best Music	Shim Hyun-jung	Won	

== Soundtrack ==
The Man from Nowhere Original Soundtrack

Soundtrack album by Shim Hyun-jung
- Released: December 14, 2010
- Recorded: 2010
- Genre: Soundtrack
- Length: 46:33
- Label: CJ Entertainment

Soundtrack list:

1. The Man from Nowhere
2. In Tae - Sik s Memory
3. Trash Can
4. Mother In Danger
5. Chasing Her
6. Chain Of Mystery
7. Fights In Golf Club
8. Finding Clue
9. Dark Knight
10. Somi in Danger
11. Surviving Today
12. Agent. Tae - Sik
13. Dirty Cash - Mystery
14. His Path Of Life
15. There's No One But You
16. Shave Himself
17. Delivering Drug
18. Jump Off
19. Spit - Mystery
20. The Last Bullet
21. Ajussi
22. Dear - Mad Soul Child

== Legacy ==
The Man from Nowhere, along with Park Chan-wook's The Vengeance Trilogy (2002–2005), influenced John Wick with "[their] minimalist composition and graphic nature."

=== Remake ===
In March 2012, Dimension Films acquired the rights to an English-language remake of The Man from Nowhere; plans are to have Shawn Christensen, who wrote and directed the 2012 short film Curfew, write the adaptation. On August 5, 2020, it was reported that the remake will be produced by John Wick director Chad Stahelski and Jason Spitz with a script provided by Derek Kolstad for New Line Cinema.

A Hindi remake titled Rocky Handsome, directed by Nishikant Kamat and starring John Abraham and Diya Chalwad, was released on March 25, 2016.
