= Poetry (film) =

2010 film by Lee Chang-dong

- Korean theatrical release poster
- Hangul: 시
- Hanja: 詩
- RR: Si
- MR: Si
- Directed by: Lee Chang-dong
- Written by: Lee Chang-dong
- Produced by: Lee Joon-dong
- Starring: Yoon Jeong-hee
- Cinematography: Kim Hyun-seok
- Edited by: Kim Hyeon
- Production companies: Pine House Film; UniKorea Pictures; Diaphana Films; Finecut
- Distributed by: Next Entertainment World (South Korea); Diaphana Distribution (France)
- Release dates: 13 May 2010 (South Korea); 25 August 2010 (France)
- Running time: 139 minutes
- Countries: South Korea; France
- Language: Korean
- Budget: US$969,949 (₩1.3 billion)
- Box office: US$2.2 million

Poetry (Korean: 시; RR: Si) is a 2010 drama film written and directed by Lee Chang-dong. Starring Yoon Jeong-hee in her first feature credit since 1994 (and the last before her death in 2023), it follows Yang Mi-ja, a suburban woman in her 60s, who begins to develop an interest in poetry while struggling with Alzheimer's disease and her irresponsible grandson.

The film had its world premiere at the main competition of the 2010 Cannes Film Festival, where it won the Best Screenplay award. Other accolades include the Grand Bell Awards for Best Picture and Best Actress, the Blue Dragon Film Awards for Best Actress, the Los Angeles Film Critics Association Award for Best Actress, and the Asia Pacific Screen Award for Achievement in Directing and Best Performance by an Actress.

It was theatrically released in South Korea by Next Entertainment World on 13 May 2010.

== Plot ==
Yang Mi-ja, a woman in her mid-sixties, lives in an old apartment with her ill-mannered 16-year-old grandson, Jong-wook, whose divorced mother lives in Busan. She relies on government welfare, supplemented by her part-time job taking care of Mr. Kang, an elderly man who has had a stroke. After noticing a poster advertising a poetry class at a local community center, she decides to enroll. The instructor tasks the students with one poem by the end of the month-long course. At his suggestion, Mi-ja begins taking notes about the things she sees, in particular flowers.

One day, Mi-ja is invited to a meeting with the fathers of Jong-wook's friends. She is informed that the boys have repeatedly raped a girl, Agnes, over the past six months, before she committed suicide by jumping off a bridge. The fathers, believing that only they and a few members of the school's faculty are aware of the situation, proposes a settlement of 30 million won to the widowed mother, a poor farmer, in order to protect their sons' futures and the school's reputation. Mi-ja, who cannot afford her portion of the payment, is noncommittal. She is later diagnosed with early-stage Alzheimer's disease. She does not speak of her financial situation or diagnosis during a phone call with her daughter. When she attempts to confront Jong-wook about his actions, he ignores her.

Mi-ja begins attending a local weekly poetry reading. A brash man, Detective Park, frequently reads beautiful poetry at these readings, but follows them with crude sexual jokes that offend Mi-ja. Mi-ja is told that the man is a policeman with a good heart, and was recently reassigned from Seoul after exposing corruption within its police force. Park later notices Mi-ja crying outside one poetry night, and asks what is making her upset, to which she does not answer.

Mi-ja temporarily quits her caretaker job after Kang makes a desperate advance toward her. She later visits the bridge where Agnes jumped, and her hat flies off into the water. She walks down to the riverbank and sits, writing poetry until it begins to rain. Dripping wet, she returns to the elderly man, agreeing to have sex with him, though they both appear emotionless during it.

Intending to use Mi-ja's age and low-class standing as leverage, the fathers ask her to travel to the countryside to convince Agnes' mother to accept the settlement. Mi-ja eventually comes across her working in the field near her house, but does not bring up the settlement. Regardless, Agnes' mother eventually agrees to settle. Mi-ja later secures her portion of the payment after visiting Kang. Once the settlement has been paid, Mi-ja phones her daughter to come home, treats Jong-wook to a meal, and helps him groom himself. That night, Detective Park comes to take Jong-wook away; Mi-ja does not stop him.

The following day, at the final session of the poetry class, the instructor discovers a bouquet from Mi-ja and her poem, titled "Agnes's Song". Mi-ja's daughter returns to an empty home and calls Mi-ja, receiving no answer. The instructor reads Mi-ja's lament to the class, which begins in Mi-ja's voice, before Agnes takes over. The final montage revisits several of the film's locations, ending on the bridge where Agnes committed suicide, as Agnes turns to the camera, half-smiling.

== Cast ==
- Yoon Jeong-hee as Yang Mi-ja
- Lee David as Park Jong-wook
- Kim Hee-ra as Mr. Kang
- Ahn Nae-sang as Ki-beom's father
- Kim Yongtaek as the teacher
- Park Myeong-sin as Agnes's mother
- Jang Hye-jin as Kang's daughter-in-law
- Kim Hye-jung as Jo Mi-hye

== Production ==
The idea for the film had its origin in a real-life case where a small town schoolgirl had been raped by a gang of teenage boys. When director Lee Chang-dong heard about the incident, it made an impact on him, although he hadn't been interested in basing a film on the actual events. Later, during a visit to Japan, Lee saw a television program in his hotel room. The program was edited entirely from relaxing shots of nature, "a peaceful river, birds flying, fishermen on the sea – with soft new-age music in the background," and a vision for a possible feature film started to form. "Suddenly, it reminded me of that horrible incident, and the word 'poetry' and the image of a 60-year old woman came up in my mind."

Lee wrote the lead character specifically for Yoon Jeong-hee, a major star of Korean cinema from the 1960s and 1970s. Yoon later expressed satisfaction with how the role differed from what she typically played in the past: "I've always had the desire to show people different aspects of my acting and (Lee) provided me with every opportunity to do just that." Before Poetry, the last film Yoon appeared in was Manmubang ("Two Flags") from 1994. Production was led by Pine House Film, founded in 2005 by the director, with co-production support from UniKorea Culture & Art Investment.

Filming started on August 25, 2009 and ended three months later in Gyeonggi Province and Gangwon Province. Lee was initially worried that Yoon's long experience might have bound her to an outdated acting style, but was very pleased with her attitude, saying, "She performed her scenes with a willingness to discuss and this is difficult to find even in younger actors."

== Release ==
On May 13, 2010, N.E.W. released Poetry in 194 South Korean theaters with a gross revenue corresponding to around US$258,000 during the first weekend. As of August 1, 2010, Box Office Mojo reported a total revenue of US$1,301,057 in the film's domestic market. The film sold 220,693 tickets nationwide in South Korea.

The international premiere took place at the 2010 Cannes Film Festival, where Poetry was screened on May 19 as part of the main competition.

The Korean DVD was released on October 23, 2010 and includes English subtitles. The film was distributed theatrically in the United States by Kino International.

It was screened at the 28th Busan International Film Festival as part of 'Special screening' on 5 October 2023.

== Reception ==
=== Critical response ===
As of May 15, 2025, the film has a 100% approval rating from critics with 71 reviews on film review aggregation site Rotten Tomatoes, with a weighted average of 8.64/10. The website's critical consensus reads, "Poetry is an absorbing, poignant drama because it offers no easy answers to its complex central conflict." At Metacritic, based on 23 critical reviews, the film had a score of 87 out of 100, categorizing it as having received "universal acclaim". "Given the abundant potential for missteps into sappiness with this sort of premise," Justin Chang wrote in Variety, "what's notable here is the lack of sentimentality in Lee's approach. At no point does Poetry devolve into a terminal-illness melodrama or a tale of intergenerational bonding." Chang continued by noting how Lee's background as a novelist sometimes shows through, and that "[t]here are longueurs here... that could be trimmed, though overall this absorbing film feels considerably shorter than its 139 minutes." It was included in CNN's list of top ten best movies of 2011, and Chicago Tribune film critic Michael Phillips named Poetry his favorite film of 2011. In 2020, The Guardian ranked it number 4 among the classics of modern South Korean Cinema.

=== Accolades ===
Lee won the Best Screenplay Award at the Cannes Film Festival. At the 47th Grand Bell Awards, Poetry won the prizes for Best Picture, Best Screenplay, Best Actress and Best Supporting Actor. The film received the Korean Association of Film Critics Awards for Best Picture and Best Screenplay. The jury of the 31st Blue Dragon Film Awards decided to exclude Poetry from the selection, since Lee had announced that he would boycott the ceremony. Still, they nominated Yoon for Best Actress as they thought the director's decision should not affect the cast. The award was eventually shared by Yoon and Soo Ae, for her performance in Midnight FM. At the 2010 Asia Pacific Screen Awards, Lee received the award for Best Achievement in Directing and Yoon for Best Performance by an Actress; the film was also nominated in the categories Best Feature Film and Best Screenplay. It was also nominated for the Grand Prix of the Belgian Syndicate of Cinema Critics.

In 2011, Poetry was nominated as Best Film at the 5th Asian Film Awards, where Lee won Best Director and Best Screenplay. It also received the Le Regard d'Or ("Golden Gaze") Grand Prix and FIPRESCI Award at the Fribourg International Film Festival. After France honored Yoon as an Officier dans l'ordre des Arts et Lettres ("Officer of the Order of Arts and Letters), she was named Best Actress at the Cinemanila International Film Festival. Yoon also won the Los Angeles Film Critics Association Award for Best Actress for her performance, marking the second consecutive year a Korean actress won the award after Kim Hye-ja won for Mother in 2010.

Award	Category	Recipient(s)	Result
Cannes Film Festival	Palme d'Or	Lee Chang-dong	Nominated
Cannes Film Festival	Best Screenplay	Lee Chang-dong	Won
Cannes Film Festival	Prize of the Ecumenical Jury - Special Mention	Lee Chang-dong	Won
Grand Bell Awards	Best Film	Poetry	Won
Grand Bell Awards	Best Director	Lee Chang-dong	Nominated
Grand Bell Awards	Best Actress	Yoon Jeong-hee	Won
Grand Bell Awards	Best Supporting Actor	Kim Hee-ra	Won
Grand Bell Awards	Best Screenplay	Lee Chang-dong	Won
Grand Bell Awards	Best Cinematography	Kim Hyun-seok	Nominated
Grand Bell Awards	Best Costume Design	Lee Choong-yeon	Nominated
Blue Dragon Film Awards	Best Actress	Yoon Jeong-hee	Won
Korean Film Awards	Best Film	Poetry	Won
Korean Film Awards	Best Director	Lee Chang-dong	Won
Korean Film Awards	Best Actress	Yoon Jeong-hee	Nominated
Korean Film Awards	Best New Actor	Lee David	Nominated
Korean Film Awards	Best Screenplay	Lee Chang-dong	Won
Korean Film Awards	Best Editing	Kim Hyeon	Nominated
Korean Film Awards	Best Sound	Lee Seung-chul	Nominated
Korean Association of Film Critics Awards	Best Film	Poetry	Won
Korean Association of Film Critics Awards	Best Screenplay	Lee Chang-dong	Won
Buil Film Awards	Best Film	Poetry	Won
Buil Film Awards	Best Screenplay	Lee Chang-dong	Won
Women in Film Korea Festival	Woman in Film of the Year	Yoon Jeong-hee	Won
Busan Film Critics Awards	Top Films of the Year	Poetry	Won
Asia Pacific Screen Awards	Best Feature Film	Poetry	Nominated
Asia Pacific Screen Awards	Achievement in Directing	Lee Chang-dong	Won
Asia Pacific Screen Awards	Best Performance by an Actress	Yoon Jeong-hee	Won
Asia Pacific Screen Awards	Best Screenplay	Lee Chang-dong	Nominated
Philadelphia Film Festival	Masters of Cinema	Lee Chang-dong	Won
Asian Film Awards	Best Film	Poetry	Nominated
Asian Film Awards	Best Director	Lee Chang-dong	Won
Asian Film Awards	Best Screenplay	Lee Chang-dong	Won
Baeksang Arts Awards	Best Film	Poetry	Nominated
Baeksang Arts Awards	Best Director	Lee Chang-dong	Won
Baeksang Arts Awards	Best Actress	Yoon Jeong-hee	Nominated
Baeksang Arts Awards	Best Screenplay	Lee Chang-dong	Nominated
Boston Society of Film Critics	Best Foreign Language Film	Poetry	Nominated
Cinemanila International Film Festival	Lino Brocka Award	Lee Chang-dong	Nominated
Cinemanila International Film Festival	Best Actress	Yoon Jeong-hee	Won
CPH PIX	Politiken's Audience Award	Lee Chang-dong	Nominated
Fribourg International Film Festival	FIPRESCI Prize	Lee Chang-dong	Won
Fribourg International Film Festival	Grand Prix	Lee Chang-dong	Won
KOFRA Film Awards	Best Film	Poetry	Won
IndieWire Critics Poll	Best Actress	Yoon Jeong-hee	4th place
Los Angeles Film Critics Association	Best Actress	Yoon Jeong-hee	Won
Village Voice Film Poll	Best Actress	Yoon Jeong-hee	4th place
Chlotrudis Awards	Best Movie	Poetry	Nominated
Chlotrudis Awards	Best Actress	Yoon Jeong-hee	Nominated
Chlotrudis Awards	Best Original Screenplay	Lee Chang-dong	Won
Gold Derby Awards	Foreign Language Film	Poetry	Nominated
International Cinephile Society	Best Actress	Yoon Jeong-hee	Nominated
International Cinephile Society	Best Film Not in the English Language	Poetry	Nominated
London Film Critics' Circle	Foreign Language Film of the Year	Poetry	Nominated
National Society of Film Critics	Best Actress	Yoon Jeong-hee	Nominated
Vancouver Film Critics Circle	Best Foreign Language Film	Poetry	Nominated

== See also ==
- List of films with a 100% rating on Rotten Tomatoes, a film review aggregator website
