= Moss (film) =

- Theatrical release poster
- Hangul: 이끼
- RR: Ikki
- MR: Ikki
- Directed by: Kang Woo-suk
- Written by: Jung Ji-woo
- Based on: Moss by Yoon Tae-ho
- Produced by: Jeong Seon-yeong
- Starring: Jung Jae-young; Park Hae-il; Yoo Jun-sang; Yoo Sun; Yoo Hae-jin
- Cinematography: Kim Seong-bok; Kim Yong-heung
- Edited by: Ko Im-pyo
- Music by: Jo Yeong-wook
- Production company: Cinema Service
- Distributed by: CJ Entertainment
- Release date: July 14, 2010 (South Korea)
- Running time: 163 minutes
- Country: South Korea
- Language: Korean
- Box office: US$21,925,534

Moss (Korean: 이끼; RR: Ikki) is a 2010 South Korean mystery thriller film directed by Kang Woo-suk. It is based on the popular webtoon of the same title by Yoon Tae-ho. The film was a box-office success and received various awards in Korea.

== Plot ==
In 1978 in a small town in South Korea, a corrupt detective named Cheon is asked by a church minister to arrest an unofficial street preacher, whose influence has been growing, and who has collected large donations. The donors are pressured into saying that they were defrauded, which leads to the preacher's imprisonment and subsequent torture by Cheon in order to extract a confession. To Cheon's surprise, the preacher demonstrates amazing endurance and will-power, leading Cheon to release him and to fund his preaching. Cheon uses their new-found friendship to bolster his own reputation and recruit henchmen. Around this time, a young girl named Lee is raped by three men, and Cheon earns her respect by beating them up.

Around 25 years later, Ryoo, the estranged son of the preacher, is anonymously informed of his father's death and travels to the town, which happens to be the new jurisdiction of his acquaintance Park, a prosecutor. Ryoo encounters an elderly Cheon, whom all the townsfolk seem to venerate and fear. With Cheon are three henchmen, Jeon, Ha, and Kim, and also Lee, who became Cheon's wife.

After the funeral, Ryoo stays to investigate, as he suspects his father was murdered, and finds several clues, such as suspicious real-estate transactions. At this point, Jeon attempts to murder Ryoo, but Ryoo fights back and kills him. Ha also attempts to murder Ryoo, who resists by lighting Ha's house on fire. Lee sees this and rescues Ryoo, and minutes later Ha burns to death, having entered the burning house to rescue his valuables.

As it turns out, Cheon has been serially extorting townspeople for their land, which he re-sells, and has murdered anyone who resisted. Due to his political connections, the police have never indicted him. Additionally, a mass poisoning at a prayer house during this period which left dozens dead remains unsolved. Park, having spoken with Ryoo, builds a case against Cheon despite the opposition of his corrupt superiors, and the last henchman Kim agrees to testify.

Cheon, who was eavesdropping on the conversation, has Kim murdered. Ryoo angrily confronts Cheon, who reveals that Ryoo's father, upon realizing the extent of Cheon's corruption, attempted to murder Cheon in his sleep. However, Lee, agrees to testify and provide evidence. She explains that years ago she had opposed a tentative plan to dispose of Ryoo's father, and in retaliation, Cheon's three henchmen had raped her.

As the town is raided by police, Ryoo, Park, and Lee confront Cheon at his house. Cheon, outraged that Lee betrayed him, argues with her over who perpetrated the prayer-house massacre. Cheon claims that Ryoo's father committed it, while Lee accuses Cheon of it. In the midst of the raid, Cheon's son attempts to burn the evidence, and accidentally kills himself. As the police try to arrest Cheon, he shoots himself in the head, which brings the case to a close, though Ryoo's father's death goes unexplained.

A year later, Ryoo visits his father's grave, and discovers that Lee has become the leader of the town. He suddenly recalls the anonymous phone call as well as the convenient placement of clues, and realizes, to his horror, that Lee was his father's murderer. Having been tortured by Cheon and wishing for an escape, Lee poisoned Ryoo's father so that Ryoo would arrive and open an investigation, the one which finally brought about Cheon's defeat.

== Cast ==
- Jung Jae-young as Cheon Yong-deok, the village head
- Park Hae-il as Ryoo Hae-kook
- Yoo Jun-sang as Park Min-wook, a public prosecutor
- Yoo Sun as Lee Yeong-ji, a village resident
- Yoo Hae-jin as Kim Deok-cheon, a village head
- Kim Sang-ho as Jeon Seok-man, a village resident
- Kim Joon-bae as Ha Seong-kyoo, a village resident
- Huh Joon-ho as Ryoo Mok-hyeon, Hae-kook's father
- Kang Shin-il as a district prosecutor
- Im Seung-dae as Mr. Cheon, a village police officer
- Jeong Gyoo-soo as a principal
- Lee Cheol-min

== Production ==
Moss was shot in Muju County, North Jeolla Province.

== International release ==
Moss was picked up for distribution in the UK by Inclusionism Films. The DVD release featured extensive interviews with both the film's director and comic artist Yoon Tae-ho.

== Awards and nominations ==
Year	Award	Category	Recipient	Result
2010	18th Chunsa Film Art Awards	Best Film	Moss	Won
2010	18th Chunsa Film Art Awards	Best Director	Kang Woo-suk	Won
2010	18th Chunsa Film Art Awards	Best Supporting Actor	Yoo Jun-sang	Won
2010	18th Chunsa Film Art Awards	Best Cinematography	Kim Seong-bok, Kim Yong-heung	Won
2010	18th Chunsa Film Art Awards	Best Lighting	Kang Dae-hee	Won
2010	18th Chunsa Film Art Awards	Best Editing	Ko Im-pyo	Won
2010	18th Chunsa Film Art Awards	Best Music	Jo Yeong-wook	Won
2010	19th Buil Film Awards	Best Actor	Jung Jae-young	Won
2010	47th Grand Bell Awards	Best Film	Moss	Nominated
2010	47th Grand Bell Awards	Best Director	Kang Woo-suk	Won
2010	47th Grand Bell Awards	Best Actor	Jung Jae-young	Nominated
2010	47th Grand Bell Awards	Best Supporting Actor	Yoo Hae-jin	Nominated
2010	47th Grand Bell Awards	Best Cinematography	Kim Sung-bok, Kim Yong-heung	Won
2010	47th Grand Bell Awards	Best Art Direction	Jo Sung-won, Lee Tae-hun	Won
2010	47th Grand Bell Awards	Best Costume Design	Jo Sang-gyeong	Nominated
2010	47th Grand Bell Awards	Best Sound Effects	Oh Se-jin, Kim Suk-won	Won
2010	31st Blue Dragon Film Awards	Best Film	Moss	Nominated
2010	31st Blue Dragon Film Awards	Best Director	Kang Woo-suk	Won
2010	31st Blue Dragon Film Awards	Best Actor	Jung Jae-young	Won
2010	31st Blue Dragon Film Awards	Best Supporting Actor	Yoo Hae-jin	Won
2010	31st Blue Dragon Film Awards	Best Supporting Actor	Yoo Jun-sang	Nominated
2010	31st Blue Dragon Film Awards	Best Supporting Actress	Yoo Sun	Nominated
2010	31st Blue Dragon Film Awards	Best Lighting	Kang Dae-hee	Won
2010	31st Blue Dragon Film Awards	Technical Award (Make-up)	Jang Jin	Nominated
2010	8th Korean Film Awards	Best Supporting Actor	Yoo Hae-jin	Won
2011	5th Asian Film Awards	Best Supporting Actor	Yoo Hae-jin	Nominated
2011	47th Baeksang Arts Awards	Best Film	Moss	Nominated
2011	47th Baeksang Arts Awards	Best Director (Film)	Kang Woo-suk	Nominated

== Reception ==
From a contemporary review for The Korea Times, Lee Hyo-won stated, "In spite of some details that go amiss as Kang tries to pack in too much, the long running time of two-and-a-half hours goes by in no time _ which says a lot about the high quality of the suspense this film aims to offer. But it also inspires a lot of laughter through some ingenious comic relief in between the thrills."

Moss received mixed retrospective reviews, praising the cinematography and acting, but criticising its length and relative predictability.

== Screenings ==
Moss was screened in New York in 2015 as part of the Korean Movie Night.
