= Harmony (2010 film) =

- Theatrical poster
- Hangul: 하모니
- RR: Hamoni
- MR: Hamoni
- Directed by: Kang Dae-kyu
- Written by: Lee Seung-yeon; Yoon Je-kyoon; Kim Hwi
- Produced by: Kim Nam-su; Yoon Je-kyoon; Jeong Jae-won
- Starring: Kim Yunjin; Na Moon-hee; Kang Ye-won
- Cinematography: Kim Young-ho
- Edited by: Shin Min-kyung
- Music by: Lee Byung-woo
- Distributed by: CJ Entertainment
- Release date: January 28, 2010
- Running time: 115 minutes
- Country: South Korea
- Language: Korean
- Box office: US$19.1 million

Harmony (Korean: 하모니) is a 2010 South Korean drama film starring Kim Yunjin and Na Moon-hee about a group of women in prison who start a choir.

It sold 3,045,009 tickets, making it the 5th best selling film of the year in Korea.

== Plot ==
Hong Jeong-hye is sentenced to serve 10 years in prison after killing her abusive husband. Pregnant at the time of her arrest, she gives birth to a baby boy behind bars but must give him up for adoption according to the law.

One day she sets out to start a choir with the help of Kim Moon-ok, a fellow inmate on death row for killing her adulterous husband and mistress. The prison chief promises her a special outing with her baby if she succeeds.

== Cast ==
- Kim Yun-jin as Hong Jeong-hye
- Na Moon-hee as Kim Moon-ok
- Kang Ye-won as Kang Yu-mi
- Jang Young-nam as Section chief Bang
- Lee Da-hee as Kong Na-yeong
- Jung Soo-young as Ji Hwa-ja
- Park Jun-myeon as Kang Yeon-sil
- Cha Jin-hyeok as Hyeon-wook
- Ji Sung-won as Hyeon-joo
- Do Yong-gu as school director
- Park Hye-jin as Yu-mi's mother
- Jeong Do-gyu as Yu-mi's adoptive father
- Kim Jae-hwa as Harmony Choir, Kwon-dal woman
- Kim Hyeon-ah as Harmony Choir, Fraudulent marriage
- Lee Do-hyeon as Jeong-hye's husband
- Lee Seung-yeon as young Kim Moon-ok
- Jeon Su-ji as teaching assistant Kang
- Moon Kyung-min as prison warden
- Lee Do-ah as "Glue ring"
- Lee Jun-hyeok as doctor in emergency room
- Cha Chung-hwa as Harmony Choir, chase woman
- Son Chae-bin as Harmony Choir, school gate

== Awards and nominations ==
Award	Category	Recipient(s)	Result
47th Grand Bell Awards	Best Film	Harmony	Nominated
47th Grand Bell Awards	Best Actress	Yunjin Kim	Nominated
47th Grand Bell Awards	Best Supporting Actress	Kang Ye-won	Nominated
47th Grand Bell Awards	Best New Actress	Kang Ye-won	Nominated
47th Grand Bell Awards	Best New Director	Kang Dae-gyu	Nominated
29th Blue Dragon Film Awards	Best Leading Actress	Yunjin Kim	Nominated
29th Blue Dragon Film Awards	Best Supporting Actress	Kang Ye-won	Nominated
29th Blue Dragon Film Awards	Best Supporting Actress	Na Moon-hee	Nominated
29th Blue Dragon Film Awards	Best New Director	Kang Dae-gyu	Nominated
29th Blue Dragon Film Awards	Best Music	Shin Min-kyung	Nominated
18th Chunsa Film Art Awards	Best New Actress	Kang Ye-won	Won
18th Chunsa Film Art Awards	Best New Director	Kang Dae-gyu	Won
46th Baeksang Arts Awards	Best New Actress	Kang Ye-won	Nominated
