= Jang Cheol-soo =

South Korean film director (born 1974)

- Born: 1974 (age 51–52); South Korea
- Occupation: Film director

Korean name
- Hangul: 장철수
- Hanja: 張哲洙
- RR: Jang Cheolsu
- MR: Chang Ch'ŏlsu

Jang Cheol-soo (born 1974) is a South Korean film director.

== Filmography ==
- The Coast Guard (2002) - assistant director
- Spring, Summer, Fall, Winter... and Spring (2003) - 1st assistant director, assistant editor
- Samaritan Girl (2004) - 1st assistant director, assistant editor
- Love, So Divine (2004) - 1st assistant director
- Escalator to Heaven (short film) (2006) - director, screenwriter
- Bedevilled (2010) - director
- Secretly, Greatly (2013) - director, script editor
- Murder at Honeymoon Hotel (2016) - director
- SF8 ("White Crow" episode) (2020) - director
- Serve the People (2022) - director

== Awards ==
- 2010 47th Grand Bell Awards: Best New Director (Bedevilled)
- 2010 30th Korean Association of Film Critics Awards: Best New Director (Bedevilled)
- 2010 8th Korean Film Awards: Best New Director (Bedevilled)
- 2010 13th Director's Cut Awards: Best New Director (Bedevilled)
- 2011 Imagine Film Festival: Black Tulip Award, Best Feature (Bedevilled)
