= Bedevilled (2010 film) =

- Theatrical poster
- Hangul: 김복남 살인 사건의 전말
- Hanja: 金福南 殺人事件의 顚末
- RR: Gim Boknam sarin sageonui jeonmal
- MR: Kim Pongnam sarin sakŏnŭi chŏnmal
- Directed by: Jang Cheol-soo
- Written by: Choi Kwang-young
- Produced by: Park Kyu-young
- Starring: Seo Young-hee; Ji Sung-won
- Cinematography: Kim Gi-tae
- Edited by: Kim Mi-joo
- Music by: Kim Tae-seong
- Distributed by: Sponge ENT
- Release dates: May 2010 (Cannes); September 2, 2010 (South Korea)
- Running time: 115 minutes
- Country: South Korea
- Language: Korean
- Budget: US$636,363
- Box office: US$1.1 million

Bedevilled (Korean: 김복남 살인 사건의 전말; lit. '"The Whole Story of the Kim Bok-nam Murder Case"') is a 2010 South Korean horror film starring Seo Young-hee and Ji Sung-won. The film premiered as an official selection of Critics' Week at the 2010 Cannes Film Festival.

It is the feature directorial debut of Jang Cheol-soo, who worked as an assistant director on the Kim Ki-duk films Samaritan Girl and Spring, Summer, Fall, Winter... and Spring. The film was a runaway hit in Korea, with the box-office returns far exceeding its ₩700 million (US$636,363) budget.

== Plot ==
Hae-won works in a Seoul bank. A stern, tense woman, her status and hyper competitive mentality make her apathetic to other people. After witnessing violence against a woman resulting in death, she refuses to identify the culprit because it's not her problem, even after the offender sexually harasses her. At work, she is accidentally locked in the toilet by the janitor and assumes one of her co-workers pranked her. She slaps her co-worker before realizing she is wrong. Hae-won is suspended and accepts a friend's offer to take a vacation in Mudo, the desolate and socially backward Southern island where she spent her childhood.

On the island, Hae-won is warmly welcomed by Bok-nam, with whom she was close when they were teenagers, but whose constant letters she's since ignored. Life on the undeveloped island is hard, and Bok-nam is treated as little more than a slave by her abusive husband Man-jong, his lustful brother, and the local women. Bok-nam's love is reserved for her young daughter Yeon-hee, with whom she tries to escape for a better life. Man-jong is abusing and grooming Yeon-hee, to Bok-nam's rage. Yeon-hee is accidentally killed while trying to defend her mother against Man-Jong. Bok-nam, crying, reveals that Yeon-Hee may not be Man-Jong's daughter, as Bok-nam was raped by many local men.

In a flashback, Hae-won was teaching Bok-nam how to play a tune on her recorder when four local boys began harassing them. Hae-won fled and witnessed the boys assaulting the unconscious Bok-nam.

The locals lie to police when questioned about the death of Yeon-hee, and Hae-won does not support Bok-nam. Bok-nam snaps and begins killing everyone she comes across, armed with a sickle. After murdering three old women, she chases her mother-in-law to the cliff. The mother-in-law sees Man-Jong and his brother returning by boat and tries to swim to the boat for help. Due to poor eyesight, she miscalculates the distance to the water and dies falling on the rocks below. Bok-nam decapitates her brother-in-law. Man-jong tries to kill Bok-nam, snapping Hae-won out of her apathy. She threatens to call the police, and he says he can either kill Hae-won or make her his new wife. Bok-nam seduces him by licking his knife. As Man-jong lets down his guard, she bites his finger. Man-jong hits her and tries to reach for an axe to kill her but Bok-nam uses her mouth to grab the knife and fatally stab Man-Jong. As Man-Jong clings to his life, Bok-nam hacks him to death. She smears his body with bean paste in mockery of his earlier remark about curing her bruises with bean paste. Terrified, Hae-won runs to the boat. Bok-nam catches up and tries to drown the oarsman for helping Man-jong. As Hae-won tries to turn the boat, the oarsman is caught in the propeller and torn to shreds. Hae-won escapes to the mainland.

Bok-nam travels to the mainland wearing Hae-won's clothes and carrying the childhood recorder, going to the police station where Hae-won is in custody. Hae-won did witness Yeon-hee's murder, but lied to the investigator about being asleep. Bok-nam chases Hae-won with a sledgehammer, attempting to kill her. The police officer, who investigated Yoon-heo's death, shoots Bok-nam, but she manages to kill him with the sledgehammer. Hae-won kills Bok-nam, who dies in her lap, with the broken recorder. All the murdered victims have been buried or cremated by Bok-nam, leaving the island devoid of human life.

Traumatized and guilt-ridden, Hae-won points out the culprits of the sexual assault she witnessed to the police. She takes Bok-nam's letters out of the trash and reads them, regretting not helping Bok-nam when she had the chance.

== Cast ==
=== Main characters ===
- Seo Young-hee – Kim Bok-nam
- Ji Sung-won – Hae-won
- Park Jeong-hak – Man-jong
- Baek Su-ryun – Dong-ho's granny
- Bae Sung-woo – Cheol-jong
- Oh Yong – Deuk-su
- Lee Ji-eun – Kim Yeon-hee
- Kim Gyeong-ae – Pa-ju's granny
- Son Yeong-sun – Sun-yi's granny
- Lee Myeong-ja – Gae-tong's granny
- Yu Sun-cheol – Old man with Alzheimer's
- Jo Deok-jae – Police officer Seo
- Chae Shi-hyeon – Mi-ran

=== Supporting characters ===
- Tak Seong-eun – Ji-su
- Hong Seung-jin – Yankee's
- Hwang Min-ho – Dodger's
- Hong Jae-seong – Police officer Jang
- Jeong Gi-seob – Officer Choi
- Ahn Jang-hun – Mr. Jang
- Myeong Ro-jin – Bank manager
- Kim Gyeong-ran – Old lady at bank
- Jae Min – Victim
- Park Jeong-sun – Victim's father
- Seong Won-yong – Supervisor
- Han Dong-hak – Superintendent
- Yuk Sae-jin – Mudo policeman
- Shim Seung-hyeon – Mudo policeman
- Kim Yong – Seoul policeman
- Yu Seung-oh – Seoul policeman
- Na Jong-ho – Old villager
- Hang Hae-ji – Old villager's daughter
- Yu Ae-jin – Young Bok-nam
- Chun Yeong-min – Young Hae-won
- Park Jong-bin – Young Man-jong
- Lee Da-un – Young Cheol-jong
- Park Seung-ah – Young Deok-su
- Kim Woo-seok – Young Seo
- Seo Seung-hwa – Banker
- Kim Hyeon-su – Banker
- Lee Kang-hee – Tearoom waitress
- Ahn Su-yeon – Restaurant waitress
- Kim Woo-geun – Coupon boy

== Awards ==
2010 Puchon International Fantastic Film Festival

- Best of Puchon
- Best Actress – Seo Young-hee
- Fujifilm Eterna Award

2010 Cinema Digital Seoul Film Festival

- Butterfly Award

2010 Fantastic Fest

- Audience Award
- Best Actress AMD & Dell "Next Wave" Spotlight Competition – Seo Young-hee

2010 AFI Fest

- New Auteurs

2010 Grand Bell Awards

- Best New Director – Jang Cheol-soo

2010 Korean Association of Film Critics Awards

- Best Actress – Seo Young-hee
- Best New Director – Jang Cheol-soo

2010 Korean Film Awards

- Best Actress – Seo Young-hee
- Best New Director – Jang Cheol-soo

2010 Director's Cut Awards

- Best Actress – Seo Young-hee
- Best New Director – Jang Cheol-soo

2011 KOFRA Film Awards (Korea Film Reporters Association)

- Best Actress – Seo Young-hee

2011 Gerardmer International Fantastic Film Festival

- Grand Prix

2011 Fantasporto Oporto International Film Festival

- Best Actress – Seo Young-hee

2011 Imagine: Amsterdam Fantastic Film Festival

- Black Tulip (Grand Jury Prize)

2011 Golden Cinematography Awards

- Best Film
- Best New Actress – Ji Sung-won
- Bronze Medal Cinematography – Kim Gi-tae
