= I Saw the Devil =

2010 film by Kim Jee-woon

- Theatrical release poster
- Hangul: 악마를 보았다
- Hanja: 惡魔를 보았다
- RR: Angmareul boatda
- MR: Angmarŭl poatta
- Directed by: Kim Jee-woon
- Written by: Park Hoon-jung
- Produced by: Kim Hyun-woo
- Starring: Lee Byung-hun; Choi Min-sik
- Cinematography: Lee Mo-gae
- Edited by: Nam Na-yeong
- Music by: Mowg
- Production companies: Peppermint & Company; SoftBank Ventures Korea; Finecut
- Distributed by: Showbox
- Release date: August 12, 2010
- Running time: 144 minutes
- Country: South Korea
- Language: Korean
- Budget: US$6 million
- Box office: US$13 million

I Saw the Devil (Korean: 악마를 보았다) is a 2010 South Korean action thriller film directed by Kim Jee-woon and written by Park Hoon-jung. Starring Lee Byung-hun and Choi Min-sik, the film follows NIS agent Kim Soo-hyun (Lee), who embarks on a quest for vengeance when his fiancée is brutally murdered by serial killer Jang Kyung-chul (Choi).

I Saw the Devil marks Choi Min-sik's first major role since the changes to the Korean screen quota system. The film premiered in the United States at the 2011 Sundance Film Festival and had a limited U.S. theatrical release, where it received generally favourable reviews from critics who praised its cinematography, cast performances and action sequences but criticized the graphic violence.

== Plot ==
Jang Kyung-chul, a school bus driver, encounters a woman named Jang Joo-yun and offers to fix her flat tire. After beating her unconscious and bringing her to his house, Kyung-chul methodically dismembers her, unaware of her ring falling into a floor drain. Kyung-chul scatters the body parts into a local river, where it is discovered, prompting the police to conduct a search led by Squad Chief Jang, Joo-yun's father, and Squad Chief Oh. Joo-yun's fiancé, Kim Soo-hyun, an NIS agent, vows to exact revenge on the perpetrator.

After learning of the four suspects from Jang, Soo-hyun privately interrogates two of them. The violent encounter (part torture) of the first two suspects absolves them as his wife's killer. But they are not without fault, one suspect turns himself in for killing multiple schoolgirls in fear of Soo-hyun's return and seeks help from the police in the hospital. Upon searching the home of Kyung-chul (the third suspect), Soo-hyun finds Joo-yun's ring which confirms Jang Kyung-chul to be his fiancée's killer.

A short time later, Kyung-chul brings a schoolgirl home and begins to rape her. Soo-hyun interrupts and knocks him unconscious. Instead of killing Kyung-chul, Soo-hyun forces him to swallow a GPS tracking transmitter, allowing him to track Kyung-chul's movements and listen to his conversations while also fracturing his left arm.

Waking up, Kyung-chul is offered a ride by a taxi, which already carries a passenger. The taxi has a license with a profile picture of the taxi's owner, which Kyung-chul notices is not the one driving this taxi. He has stepped into a hijacked vehicle, and the occupants are acting strangely. Kyung-chul attacks them seconds before they attack and murders them. Kyung-chul checks the trunk of the taxi and finds a murder victim (presumably the taxi driver) and a bag of fresh clothes. He leaves their bodies on the side of the road, and cleans up in a nearby river.

Kyung-chul drives to a clinic to have his wounds looked at. After being treated, Kyung-chul proceeds to rape a nurse. Soo-hyun arrives, subdues him, and slashes his achilles tendon before leaving. At this point, Soo-hyun's intention becomes clear: he wants to torture Kyung-chul as long as possible. Kyung-chul visits the home of his friend Tae-joo, a cannibalistic murderer and meets his girlfriend Se-jung who seems nonchalant about the meeting.

After learning of the situation, Tae-joo remarks that his tormentor must be related to one of his victims. Kyung-chul deduces Soo-hyun's identity after recalling that his wedding ring matched that of Joo-yun. Soo-hyun arrives and incapacitates Kyung-chul, Tae-joo, and his girlfriend Se-jung. The next day, Tae-joo and Se-jung, still unconscious, are arrested by the police and sent to the hospital. Soo-hyun and Kyung-chul receive treatment for their wounds, aided by Soo-hyun's trusted subordinate, who helps them evade the cops. Kyung-chul wakes up and overhears Soo-hyun and the subordinate talking about the transmitter.

After being released, Kyung-chul steals and uses laxatives to excrete the transmitter, where he plants it on a taxi driver at a truck stop. Soo-hyun enters Tae-joo's hospital room to question him and learns that Kyung-chul is going after Jang and his other daughter, Jang Se-yun. Enraged by Tae-joo telling him the details of Joo-yun's murder, Soo-hyun rips his mouth open. Kyung-chul arrives at Jang's house, brutally assaults him, and kills Se-yun. Kyung-chul attempts to avoid Soo-hyun's revenge by surrendering himself to the police, but Soo-hyun abducts Kyung-chul in a car before the police can apprehend him.

Soo-hyun drives to Kyung-chul's house, where he tortures him, places him under Kyung-chul's makeshift guillotine and leaves him holding a rope between his teeth to keep the blade from falling. Though he mocks Soo-hyun, Kyung-chul begins to panic when he learns that his son and elderly parents, whom he had abandoned some time ago, have arrived and are trying to visit him. As his family opens the door, the guillotine blade is Booby-trapped to fall and beheads Kyung-chul. Listening to the family's anguish through the transmitter which he placed next to Kyung-chul's head, Soo-hyun breaks down and begins crying hysterically as he walks away from the scene.

== Cast ==
- Lee Byung-hun as Kim Soo-hyeon, an agent in the National Intelligence Service
- Choi Min-sik as Jang Kyung-chul, an academy bus driver and serial killer who murdered Soo-hyeon's partner.
- Jeon Gook-hwan as Squad Chief Jang, Joo-yun and Se-yun's father
- Chun Ho-jin as Section Chief Oh, the leader of the police
- Oh San-ha as Jang Joo-yeon, Soo-hyun's fiancée and Se-yun's older sister
- Kim Yoon-seo as Jang Se-yun, Joo-yun's younger sister
- Choi Moo-sung as Tae-joo, a murderer and Kyung-chul's friend
- Kim In-seo as Se-jung, Tae-joo's girlfriend
- Nam Bo-ra as Section Chief Oh's daughter
- Yoon Chae-young as small town nurse
- Ha Seung-ri as Junior high female student

== Alternate versions ==
The Korea Media Rating Board forced Kim to recut the film for its theatrical release, objecting to its violent content. The film received a "Restricted" rating twice, preventing any sort of release in theatres or on home video and promotions as well. Seven cuts were made with the total runtime of removed material between eighty and ninety seconds.

== Release ==
I Saw the Devil was released in South Korea on August 12, 2010. The film premiered at the 2011 Sundance Film Festival on January 21, 2011. It also received screenings at several other international film festivals, including the Fantasporto Film Festival, Toronto International Film Festival, Sitges Film Festival, San Sebastian Film Festival and the London Korean Film Festival.

North American distribution rights were acquired by Magnet Releasing who released it on a limited basis on March 4, 2011. Optimum Releasing distributed the film in the United Kingdom.

=== Home media ===
The film was released on DVD as a three-disc set, which contains both the Korean theatrical version and international version, in South Korea on March 29, 2011. The DVD and Blu-ray for the US and Canadian markets were released on May 10, 2011.

== Reception ==
=== Critical reception ===
The review aggregation website Rotten Tomatoes gives the film a score of 81%, with an average of 7.2/10, based on 86 reviews from critics. The website's consensus says: "Never flinching during its descent into depravity, I Saw The Devil is a pulverizing thriller that will give bloody satisfaction to audiences who like their revenge served with fiery rage." On Metacritic, the film received "generally favorable reviews," with a weighted average of 67 out of 100, based on 19 reviews.

Jeannette Catsoulis of The New York Times wrote, "From an unexpectedly moving first act to a hilariously disgusting sojourn with Kyung-chul's cannibal pal, Mr. Kim and his cinematographer, Lee Mo-gae, retain complete control of the film's fluctuating tones and impressive set pieces." Mark Olson of the Los Angeles Times wrote, "There is all the violent mayhem, for certain, but the thing that sets I Saw the Devil apart is its undercurrent of real emotion and how unrelentingly sad it can be." Rob Nelson from Variety magazine stated, "Repugnant content, grislier than the ugliest torture porn, ought to have made the film unwatchable, but it doesn't, simply because Kim's picture is so beautifully filmed, carefully structured and viscerally engaging." Bloody Disgusting's Brad Miska gave it a rating of four-and-a-half out of five, writing: "I could talk for hours about I Saw the Devil, but nothing I can say will ever do it justice. The film is an experience; it's something that will have you emotionally invested in the characters, while also covering your eyes at the extreme violence," whereas Empire rated the film four out of five, stating, "This gleefully black horror-thriller is a very classy follow-up to The Good, the Bad, the Weird for Kim Jee-Woon." Phelim O'Neil from The Guardian wrote, "There's no shortage of Korean revenge-thrillers, but this, along with the recent The Man from Nowhere, proves there is plenty of life left in the genre" and gave it a four star rating out five.

Not all critics were favorable towards the film's brutality; Mark Jenkins of The Washington Post wrote, "Director Kim Jee-woon is a born filmmaker, even if this script (written by Park Hoon-jung and adapted by Kim) is unworthy of his efforts" and rated it two out of five stars. Elizabeth Kerr of The Hollywood Reporter wrote that, "On any number of levels, Devil is troublesome at best, offensive at worst."

In 2014, Rolling Stone magazine put I Saw the Devil in the top 20 of "the scariest movies you've never seen." In 2019, Jim Vorel of Paste named it the best horror film of 2010, writing of its ultimate conclusion: "It's one of the great, empty victories of horror cinema in the 2010s, and should be seen by a larger audience."

=== Awards and nominations ===
Award	Category	Nominee(s)	Result
Asian Film Awards	Best Editor	Nam Na-yeong	Won
Asian Film Awards	Best Cinematographer	Lee Mo-gae	Nominated
Austin Film Critics Association	Best Foreign Language Film	I Saw the Devil	Won
Austin Film Critics Association	Best Film	I Saw the Devil	Nominated
Blue Dragon Film Awards	Best Actor	Lee Byung-hun	Nominated
Blue Dragon Film Awards	Best Cinematography	Lee Mo-gae	Won
Blue Dragon Film Awards	Best Art Direction	Cho Hwa-sung	Nominated
Blue Dragon Film Awards	Best Music	Mowg	Won
Blue Dragon Film Awards	Technical Award	Jeong Do-an, Lee Hee-kyung (Special Effects)	Nominated
Baeksang Arts Awards	Grand Prize (Daesang)	Lee Byung-hun	Won
Baeksang Arts Awards	Best Actor	Lee Byung-hun	Nominated
Brussels International Festival of Fantasy Film	Golden Raven	I Saw the Devil	Won
Central Ohio Film Critics Association	Best Foreign Language Film	I Saw the Devil	Nominated
Fangoria Chainsaw Awards	Best Foreign Language Film	I Saw the Devil	Nominated
Fangoria Chainsaw Awards	Best Actor	Choi Min-sik	Nominated
Fantasporto Film Festival	Best Film	I Saw the Devil	Won
Fantasporto Film Festival	Best Director	Kim Jee-woon	Won
Fright Meter Awards	Best Horror Movie	I Saw the Devil	Nominated
Fright Meter Awards	Best Director	Kim Jee-woon	Won
Grand Bell Awards	Best Film	I Saw the Devil	Nominated
Grand Bell Awards	Best Actor	Lee Byung-hun	Nominated
Grand Bell Awards	Best Actor	Choi Min-sik	Nominated
Grand Bell Awards	Best Cinematography	Lee Mo-gae	Nominated
Grand Bell Awards	Best Lighting	Oh Seung-chul	Won
Grand Bell Awards	Best Costume Design	Kwon Yu-jin	Nominated
Gérardmer Film Festival	Audience Award	I Saw the Devil	Won
Gérardmer Film Festival	Critics Award	Kim Jee-woon	Won
Gérardmer Film Festival	Special Jury Prize	Kim Jee-woon	Won
Gérardmer Film Festival	Youth Jury Grand Prize	I Saw the Devil	Won
Houston Film Critics Society Awards	Best Foreign Language Film	I Saw the Devil	Won
Scream Awards	Best Horror Movie	I Saw the Devil	Nominated
Scream Awards	Best Villain	Choi Min-sik	Nominated
Scream Awards	Best Independent Movie	Kim Jee-woon	Nominated
St. Louis Film Critics Association Awards	Best Foreign Language Film	I Saw the Devil	Nominated
Washington D.C. Area Film Critics Association Awards	Best Foreign Language Film	I Saw the Devil	Nominated

== See also ==
- Ek Villain, 2014 Indian remake
