= A Barefoot Dream =

2010 film

- Film poster
- Directed by: Kim Tae-kyun
- Written by: Kim Gwang-hun
- Produced by: Kim Tae-kyun; Yu Jeong-hun
- Starring: Park Hee-soon; Ko Chang-seok
- Cinematography: Jeong Han-cheol
- Edited by: Shin Min-kyung
- Music by: Kim Joon-seok
- Distributed by: Showbox/Mediaplex
- Release date: 24 June 2010
- Running time: 121 minutes
- Country: South Korea
- Language: Korean
- Box office: US$2 million

A Barefoot Dream (Korean: 맨발의 꿈; RR: Maenbarui kkum) is a 2010 sports drama film directed by Kim Tae-kyun. A co-production between South Korea and Japan, it is based on the true story of Kim Shin-hwan, a retired Korean footballer who goes to East Timor after his business fails and launches a youth football team, thus becoming the "Hiddink of Korea." The film was selected as the South Korean entry for the Best Foreign Language Film at the 83rd Academy Awards, but it did not make the final shortlist. The film recorded 332,699 admissions during its theatrical run in South Korea.

== Plot ==
Kim Won-kang (Park Hee-soon) is a former football prospect whose life did not turn out quite as he had hoped. He heads to East Timor, where he thinks there will be plenty of opportunities for him. One day, he sees a group of street kids playing football with bare feet. Thinking he can score by selling football shoes, he opens a sports equipment store, but realizes none of the kids can afford those fancy shoes or jerseys. Again, despaired, he is about to close up the store. Then, he decides to teach the kids how to play football. Penniless and still without shoes, they decide to compete in an international tournament in Japan.

== Cast ==
- Park Hee-soon as Coach Kim Won-kang
- Ko Chang-seok as Park In-gi
- Francisco Varela as Ramos
- Fernando Pinto as Motavio
- Junior Da Costa as Tua
- Marlina Simoes as Josephine
- Kei Shimizu as Dozyo
- Im Won-hee as Director Poong
- Kim Seo-hyung as Reporter Yu Bo-hyeon
- Shin Cheol-jin as Shin Young-hoon
- Cho Jin-woong as James

== See also ==
- List of submissions to the 83rd Academy Awards for Best Foreign Language Film
- List of South Korean submissions for the Academy Award for Best Foreign Language Film
