= TeleAsia =

Defunct Filipino cable channel

- Country: Philippines
- Broadcast area: Defunct
- Headquarters: San Juan City, Philippines

Ownership
- Owner: MyPinoy TV Broadband Inc.

History
- Launched: December 18, 2012
- Closed: September 17, 2015

TeleAsia was a Filipino entertainment cable channel based in the Philippines. TeleAsia brings Asianovela from Korea, Taiwan, China and the rest of Asia, as well as Pinoy remakes of Asianovelas. TeleAsia is owned by MyPinoy TV Broadband Inc. in partnership with Telesuccess Inc.

TeleAsia was available in 2 separate channels: TeleAsia Chinese (broadcast in Mandarin and Hokkien) and TeleAsia Filipino (broadcast in Tagalog).

TeleAsia Chinese was the second Chinese channel in the Philippines.

After almost 3 years of broadcasting, TeleAsia Filipino and TeleAsia Chinese ceased broadcasting on television effective September 17, 2015.

== Programming ==
This is a list of general entertainment programs broadcast on the premium television channels TeleAsia Filipino and TeleAsia Chinese. All programs listed below are dubbed in Filipino for TeleAsia Filipino and in original Mandarin and Cantonese audio and dubbed in Mandarin and Hokkien with subtitles for TeleAsia Chinese as the channel is only broadcast in the Philippines.

Each program is listed with its most notable/original title with the channel's designation, year of airing and other notes in parentheses.

== Legend ==
*: First Philippine airing on the channel
^{+}: First aired on different channels in the Philippines and dubbed in English

== The Final Program Line-Up ==
=== TeleAsia Filipino ===
- Ako si Kim Samsoon
- All About Eve
- Amaya
- Ang Iibigin ay Ikaw
- Ang Iibigin ay Ikaw Pa Rin
- Atashin'chi (Season 2)
- Bad Woman, Good Woman (as "Good Wife, Bad Wife")
- Baki the Grappler
- Bakugan Battle Brawlers^{+}
  - Bakugan Battle Brawlers: New Vestroia^{+}
  - Bakugan Battle Brawlers: Gundalian Invaders^{+}
- Bakuman*
- Basketball Tribe
- Battle Spirits
- Becoming a Billionaire*
- Beethoven Virus
- Black and White
- Bride of the Century
- Cinderella Man
- Cinderella's Stepsister
- Coffee Prince
- Dong Yi
- Easy Fortune, Happy Life
- EZ Shop
- Flames of Desire
- Cool Guys, Hot Ramen
- Fairy Tail (Season 1)
- Fated to Love You (Taiwanese version)
- Flame of Recca
- Full House
- Fushigi Yugi
- Giant
- Gokusen, Gokusen II and Gokusen III (live action)
- Glass Castle
- Good Job, Good Job (as "Cheer Up on Love")
- Hajime no Ippo (as "Knock Out")
- Hatsumei Boy Kanipan (as "Gadget Boy")
- High Kick!
- Heaven's Dragon*
- Heavenly Beauty*
- Hunter × Hunter (1999 TV series; 2002 OVA only)
- I Love You, Don't Cry (as "Don't Cry, My Love")
- Inuyasha: The Final Act
- Invincible Shan Bao Mei*
- Jewel in the Palace
- Kōtetsu Sangokushi*
- K-On!* and K-On!!*
- Masked Rider 555
- Masked Rider Hibiki
- Kung Fu Soccer*
- The Legend
- The Legend of Bruce Lee
- Likeable or Not
- Love You a Thousand Times
- My Lovely Sam Soon (as "My Name is Kim Sam Soon")
- My Lucky Star
- Night After Night
- Pink Lipstick
- Powerpuff Girls Z
- The Prince of Tennis
- Queen of Reversals
- Queen Seon Deok
- Condor Romance (as "Love of the Condor Heroes")
- Rockman.EXE Axess
  - Rockman.EXE Stream
  - Rockman.EXE Beast
  - Rockman.EXE Beast Plus*
- Queen of Housewives (as "My Wife is a Superwoman")
- S · A: Special A (as "Special A")
- Shaman King
- Shin Mazinger Z Impact (as "Shin Mazinger Edition Z")
- Smile Honey
- Shaider
- Starlit*
- Tactics
- TeleSine Weekend Specials
- Tenjho Tenge
- Three Brothers
- Time Between Dog and Wolf
- Tokyo Majin
- Unfrogettable Affection*
- What's for Dinner?
- White Lies
- Wife Returns (as "Return of the Wife")
- Yatterman (2008 version)
- Ying Ye 3 Jia 1 (as "Sakurano 3 + 1")
- YuYu Hakusho (as "Ghost Fighter")

=== TeleAsia Chinese ===
- A Man Called God*
- The Abandoned Secret*
- The Accidental Couple*
- All Men Are Brothers*
- Angel Lover*
- Beauty's Rival in Palace*
- Backkom*
- Billie Jean, Look at Me*
- The Birth of the Rich*
- Bride of the Century
- Bubble Carp
- Bull Fighting (as "Freestyle")
- Butterfly Romance*
- Cinderella Man
- Cinderella's Sister
- Condor Romance (as "Love of the Condor Heroes")
- Cool Guys, Hot Ramen*
- Crimson Sabre (as "Sword Stained with Royal Blood (2000)")
- The Deer and the Cauldron*
- Demi-Gods and Semi-Devils*
- Dr. Jin*
- Dong Yi
- Easy Fortune, Happy Life
- Eternal Love*
- Fated to Love You (Taiwanese version)
- First Wives' Club
- Flames of Desire
- Flower Boys Next Door*
- Giant
- Happy Noodle*
- Heaven's Dragon*
- Hero
- Hi My Sweetheart*
- Holding Hands*
- The Investiture of the Gods (2014)*
- Jewel in the Palace
- Invincible Shan Bao Mei*
- Kamen Rider OOO
- Knock Knock Loving You*
- Kung Fu Soccer*
- Laughing in the Wind*
- The Legend (as "Four Gods and a King")
- The Legend of Goddess Luo*
- The Little Fairy*
- Love Actually*
- Loving You a Thousand Times
- Madam White Snake*
- The Magic Blade*
- The Master of the House*
- May Queen*
- Mei Fong's Cooking Class*
- Meteor, Butterfly, Sword*
- Miss Rose*
- Mrs. Town*
- The Mu Saga*
- Music Bank* (2011 episodes only)
- My Lucky Star
- My Queen* (as "Queen of No Marriage")
- New Heavenly Sword and Dragon Sabre* (as "Dragon Sabre Yitian")
- Night After Night
- Pandamen*
- The Palace: The Last Daughter*
- Personal Taste* (as "Real Taste")
- Pink Lipstick
- Queen of Housewives (as "My Wife is a Superwoman")
- Queen of Reversals
- Smile Honey
- Snow City*
- Starlit*
- Swordsman*
- Time Between Dog and Wolf
- Unforgettable Affection*
- Vicky and Johnny Larva*
- The Virtuous Queen of Han*
- Voltes V*
- White Lies
- When It's At Night*
- Wife Returns* (as "Return of Wife")
- Wives*
- Yes No.1 Flavor*
- You Are My Destiny
