= Park Chan-ok =

South Korean film director and screenwriter

- Born: 1968 (age 57–58); Gurye County, South Jeolla Province, South Korea
- Education: Hanyang University; Korea National University of Arts
- Occupations: Film director, screenwriter
- Years active: 1995-present

Korean name
- Hangul: 박찬옥
- Hanja: 朴燦玉
- RR: Bak Chanok
- MR: Pak Ch'anok

Park Chan-ok (born 1968) is a South Korean film director and screenwriter. She wrote and directed Jealousy Is My Middle Name (2003) and Paju (2009).

== Career ==
Born in 1968, Park Chan-ok majored in Theater and Film Studies at Hanyang University, then attended graduate school at Korea National University of Arts. She began her career in the independent film scene with production company Generation Blue Films, directing several award-winning short films. Her shorts include Cat Woman & Man (1995), To Be (1996) which won First Prize at the 1st Women's Film Festival in Seoul as well as the Audience Award at the Hanover Film Festival, Heavy (1998) which won the Sonje Award at the 3rd Busan International Film Festival, and Performance Experience (1999). She also served as assistant director on Jung Ji-woo's short A Bit Bitter (1996) and Hong Sang-soo's Virgin Stripped Bare by Her Bachelors (2000).

Park made her feature film debut with Jealousy Is My Middle Name, which drew critical acclaim and won the New Currents Award at the 7th Busan International Film Festival in 2002, Best Screenplay at the 24th Blue Dragon Film Awards, and the Tiger Award at the 32nd International Film Festival Rotterdam in 2003. Starring Moon Sung-keun, Bae Jong-ok and a star-making turn from Park Hae-il, the complex relationship drama is about a graduate student who starts working for the magazine editor-in-chief that his girlfriend dumped him for, while both men circle around a freelance photographer/veterinarian. Calling it an "impressive debut," Variety compared Park to her mentor Hong Sang-soo, one of Korea's leading auteurs, regarding the film's incisive portrayal of human emotions and its ironic, subtly humorous but insightful dialogue, but described her filmmaking style as "less detached."

She next wrote and directed the short film Warm Swamp in 2004. But despite winning the Kodak Award and its cash grant of ₩20 million (US$19,000) from the Pusan Promotion Plan in 2005, it would take Park seven years to get her sophomore film completed.

Park's long-awaited second feature Paju premiered at the 14th Busan International Film Festival in 2009, where it won the NETPAC Award (jury members described it as a "fine example of passionate, high-quality filmmaking"). A realistic portrait of modern Korean society through the eyes of a young woman who falls for her former democratic activist brother-in-law (played by Seo Woo and Lee Sun-kyun) while suspecting he may have had something to do with her sister's mysterious death, the film is set in the titular city of Paju, a grim, foggy locale which was once a longtime military garrison and is now a developing urban hub located close to the inter-Korean border; the city's uncomfortable gentrification social politics acts as backdrop to the characters' internal conflict. Park said she "wanted to talk about emotions shared by two people who are similarly alone. [...] More than a love affair between a man and a woman, the relationship between Joong-shik and Eun-mo is more of compassion that those in agony are likely to develop for each other." Despite a lackluster box office, the film was well received by local and international critics; Screen International called it "intimate in scale but forcefully ambitious in its rich imagery and confident handling" and predicted "This should help to cement Park's reputation as one of Korea's most talented art-house directors," while Variety praised the film's handling of elements of melodrama, action and mystery, saying they "make it function like a Bergmanesque thriller."

Paju also won the Special Jury Prize at the 13th Deauville Asian Film Festival, the NETPAC Award at the 4th Asia Pacific Screen Awards, and was the opening film of the 39th International Film Festival Rotterdam (the first Korean film ever chosen to open the Dutch film fest). Park was named Woman Filmmaker of the Year at the 10th Women in Film Korea Awards in 2009, and received a Best Director nomination at the 46th Baeksang Arts Awards.

In 2012, Park appeared in Heo Chul's documentary Ari Ari the Korean Cinema, and has served as production consultant on several indie films.

== Filmography ==
- Cat Woman & Man (short film, 1995) - director, screenwriter, editor, producer
- A Bit Bitter (short film, 1996) - assistant director, co-screenwriter
- To Be (short film, 1996) - director, screenwriter, editor, producer, synchronous recording
- Welcome (short film, 1997) - lighting
- Heavy (short film, 1998) - director, screenwriter, editor
- Performance Experience (short film, 1999) - director, screenwriter
- Virgin Stripped Bare by Her Bachelors (2000) - assistant director
- Jealousy Is My Middle Name (2003) - director, screenwriter
- Warm Swamp (short film, 2004) - director, screenwriter
- The Day After (2009) - production adviser
- Paju (2009) - director, screenwriter
- Ingtoogi: The Battle of Internet Trolls (2013) - production consultant
- Tinker Ticker (2014) - production consultant
- Guardian (2014) - production consultant
- The Legacy (2014) - production consultant

== Awards ==
- 2003 24th Blue Dragon Film Awards: Best Screenplay (Jealousy Is My Middle Name)
- 2009 10th Women in Film Korea Awards: Woman Filmmaker of the Year (Paju)
