= Paju (film) =

- Film poster
- Hangul: 파주
- Hanja: 坡州
- RR: Paju
- MR: P'aju
- Directed by: Park Chan-ok
- Written by: Park Chan-ok
- Produced by: Lee Eun; Kim Ju-kyung; Eom Ju-yung
- Starring: Lee Sun-kyun; Seo Woo
- Cinematography: Kim Woo-hyung
- Edited by: Kim Hyeong-ju
- Music by: Jang Young-gyu
- Production companies: TPS Company; Myung Films
- Distributed by: Warner Bros. Korea
- Release date: October 29, 2009
- Running time: 111 minutes
- Country: South Korea
- Language: Korean
- Box office: US$818,676

Paju (Korean: 파주) is a 2009 South Korean drama film. It tells the tale of a teenage schoolgirl (Seo Woo) and her complex relationship with her older sister's husband (Lee Sun-kyun). Set in the city where it takes its name from – a longtime military area and now a developing city located close to the North/South Korean border – its narrative deals with guilt, mystery, love and redemption, as well as the psychological layers of its characters. The film also offers a glimpse into South Korean society and the struggles some residents of Paju face.

In 2010 Paju became the first ever Korean film to open the International Film Festival Rotterdam and to compete at the Tribeca Film Festival.

== Plot ==
Twenty-something Eun-mo listens to a taxi driver drone on as she rides down a foggy highway. The story then cycles back eight years earlier, when a lustful Joong-shik accidentally causes a woman to neglect her baby with disastrous consequences. Suffering from guilt, Joong-shik goes on the lam and holes up in the titular city of Paju, an underdeveloped and desolate city just north of Seoul and near the North Korean border. Teaching religious classes to the town's schoolgirls, Joong-shik captures the heart of local house owner Eun-soo, despite the protestations of her pubescent younger sister and Joong-shik's student Eun-mo.

Back in the present day, Joong-shik is now the ringleader of a political protest group whose interests run from obstructing the city's plans of gentrification to strengthening relations with North Koreans. Squatting in Paju's derelict apartments, the group is under siege from an unidentified property developer who has engaged goons to bulldoze the buildings. With only the briefest of hints as to what has transpired, Eun-soo is nowhere to be seen and Joong-shik and Eun-mo are clearly at odds. While believing her brother-in-law killed her sister for insurance money, Eun-mo finds herself falling in love with him, the sole guardian and grownup in the lonely girl's life. Narrative flashes back twice more to sparingly fill in the gaps on their shifting lives.

== Cast ==
- Lee Sun-kyun as Kim Joong-shik
- Seo Woo as Choi Eun-mo
- Shim Yi-young as Choi Eun-soo (Eun-mo's sister and Joong-shik's wife)
- Kim Bo-kyung as Jung Ja-young
- Kim Ye-ri as Mi-ae (Eun-mo's friend)
- Lee Dae-yeon as Pastor (Joong-shik's cousin)
- Lee Geung-young as gangster boss
- Son Kang-kuk as gangster
- Lee Mi-do
- Jung Man-sik as anti-demolition member
- Oh Dae-hwan as insurance examiner
- Lee Bong-kyu as tenant on 1st floor

== Production ==
This is Park Chan-ok's long-awaited follow-up to her critically praised 2002 debut Jealousy Is My Middle Name.

Park had found it difficult to secure funding for her sophomore film amidst Korean cinema's currently declining investment environment, and though her screenplay won the Kodak Award and received ₩20 million (US$19,000) worth of negative film from the Pusan Promotion Plan in 2005, it would eventually take almost seven years to complete Paju. Park said, "I stopped (filming) because I could not make any more modifications to it. I wanted to talk about emotions shared by two people who are similarly alone. More than a love affair between a man and a woman, the relationship between Joong-shik and Eun-mo is more of compassion that those in agony are likely to develop for each other."

Park said Paju is the perfect backdrop for this mysterious and gripping story. "When I think of Paju, I always view it as a mysterious place because it was always foggy whenever I visited there and it also sits right next to the border area dividing the two Koreas. I wanted to portray that mysterious feeling in the film."

== Critical reception ==
Paju played to highly impressed reviews in its debut in the 14th Busan International Film Festival. The PIFF jury awarded it the NETPAC Award, describing it as "a fine example of passionate, high-quality filmmaking."

Screen International said of director Park, "This should help to cement Park's reputation as one of [South] Korea's most talented arthouse directors" while Variety praised the film's handling of elements of melodrama, action and mystery, saying they "make it function like a Bergmanesque thriller." The Hollywood Reporter wrote that "Seo delivers one of the most believable depictions of conflicted female emotion as has ever been put on film in Korea." Koreanfilm.org called it "without question one of the best Korean films of 2009."

In 2020, the film was ranked by The Guardian number 14 among the classics of modern South Korean cinema.

== Film festivals ==
- 2009 Pusan International Film Festival
- 2010 International Film Festival Rotterdam
- 2010 Göteborg International Film Festival
- 2010 Deauville Asian Film Festival
- 2010 Trondheim International Film Festival
- 2010 Las Palmas de Gran Canaria International Film Festival
- 2010 International Women's Film Festival in Seoul
- 2010 CPH:PIX
- 2010 Tribeca Film Festival
- 2010 Barcelona Asian Film Festival
- 2010 Moscow International Film Festival
- 2010 Filmfest München
- 2010 Karlovy Vary International Film Festival
- 2010 Durban International Film Festival
- 2010 Melbourne International Film Festival
- 2010 Aichi International Women's Film Festival
- 2010 Haifa International Film Festival
- 2010 Oslo International Film Festival
- 2010 London Korean Film Festival

== Awards and nominations ==
Year	Award	Category	Recipient	Result	Ref.
2009	14th Pusan International Film Festival	NETPAC Award	Paju	Won	
2009	14th Pusan International Film Festival	New Currents Award	Paju	Nominated	
2009	10th Women in Film Korea Awards	Woman Filmmaker of the Year	Park Chan-ok	Won	
2010	13th Deauville Asian Film Festival	Jury Prize	Paju	Won	
2010	13th Deauville Asian Film Festival	Best Film	Paju	Nominated	
2010	11th Las Palmas de Gran Canaria International Film Festival	Best Actor	Lee Sun-kyun	Won	
2010	46th Baeksang Arts Awards	Best Director	Park Chan-ok	Nominated	
2010	46th Baeksang Arts Awards	Best Actress	Seo Woo	Nominated	
2010	11th Busan Film Critics Awards	Best Cinematography	Kim Woo-hyung	Won	
2010	4th Asia Pacific Screen Awards	APSA NETPAC Development Prize	Paju	Won	
2010	4th Asia Pacific Screen Awards	Best Feature Film	Paju	Nominated	
2010	4th Asia Pacific Screen Awards	Best Actress	Seo Woo	Nominated	
