= 3rd Korea Drama Awards =

2010 edition of award ceremony

- Date: October 2, 2010
- Site: Kyungnam Culture and Arts Center, Jinju, South Gyeongsang Province
- Hosted by: Lee Jae-yong; Min Hyo-rin

The 3rd Korea Drama Awards is an awards ceremony for excellence in television in South Korea. It was held at the Kyungnam Culture and Arts Center in Jinju, South Gyeongsang Province on October 2, 2010, and hosted by Min Hyo-rin and announcer Lee Jae-yong. The nominees were chosen from Korean dramas that aired from October 2009 to September 2010.

== Nominations and winners ==
(Winners denoted in bold)

Best Drama
**The Slave Hunters (KBS2)**; Dong Yi (MBC); Iris (KBS2); Bread, Love and Dreams (KBS2); Life Is Beautiful (SBS)
Best Production Director in a Miniseries	Best Production Director in a Serial Drama
**Kim Kyu-tae** - **Iris**	**Lee Jung-sub** - **Bread, Love and Dreams**
Best Screenplay in a Miniseries	Best Screenplay in a Serial Drama
**Chun Sung-il** - **The Slave Hunters**	**Kang Eun-kyung** - **Bread, Love and Dreams**
Best Actor	Best Actress
**Jang Hyuk** - **The Slave Hunters**; Jun Kwang-ryul - Bread, Love and Dreams; Kim Soo-ro - Master of Study; Lee Beom-soo - Giant; Lee Byung-hun - Iris	**Han Hyo-joo** - **Dong Yi**; Kim Tae-hee - Iris; Lee Mi-yeon - The Great Merchant; Moon Geun-young - Cinderella's Sister
Best Supporting Actor	Best Supporting Actress
**Jung Dong-hwan** - **Dong Yi**	**Kim Hae-sook** - **Life Is Beautiful**
Best New Actor	Best New Actress
**Yoon Shi-yoon** - **Bread, Love and Dreams**	**Seo Woo** - **Cinderella's Sister**
Most Popular Actor	Most Popular Actress
**Jung Yong-hwa** - **You're Beautiful**	**Hwang Jung-eum** - **High Kick Through the Roof**
Best Producer	New Media Award
**Chung Tae-won** - **Iris**	**Jo Hyun-tak** - **Golden House**
Special Jury Prize	Achievement Award
**Kim Byung-wook** - **High Kick Through the Roof**	**Lee Byung-hoon** - **Dong Yi**
