= If Tomorrow Comes (TV series) =

South Korean television series

- Also known as: When Tomorrow Comes
- Genre: Drama; Romance; Family
- Written by: Kim Jung-soo
- Directed by: Jang Yong-woo
- Starring: Seo Woo; Go Doo-shim; Ha Seok-jin
- Country of origin: South Korea
- Original language: Korean
- No. of episodes: 51

Production
- Executive producers: Kim Yong-jin; Jay Sun-hwan Yoon
- Production location: Korea
- Running time: Saturdays and Sundays at 20:40 (KST)
- Production companies: SBS Plus; Love Letter

Original release
- Network: SBS TV
- Release: October 29, 2011 – April 22, 2012

If Tomorrow Comes (Korean: 내일이 오면; RR: Naeiri omyeon) is a South Korean television series starring Seo Woo, Go Doo-shim, and Ha Seok-jin. A drama about the love and conflict between a mother and daughter, it aired on SBS from October 29, 2011 to April 22, 2012 on Saturdays and Sundays at 20:40 for 51 episodes.

== Plot ==
Yoon Eun-chae is an only child. Her parents own a mid-sized construction company, which her mother Son Jung-in runs with an iron fist. There is nothing Jung-in wouldn't do for the family business. Unlike her mother, Eun-chae has a positive outlook on life. She is currently a graduate student studying interior design, and dating Lee Young-gyun.

Lee Young-gyun is an ordinary salaryman. His parents run a restaurant, and he has three older brothers and one sister—his eldest brother Jin-gyu is an aging bachelor, Sung-ryong has a limited mental capacity, and Il-bong is a troublemaker. Because of this, Jung-in doesn't approve of him as a match for her daughter.

== Cast ==
- Seo Woo as Yoon Eun-chae
- Go Doo-shim as Son Jung-in
- Ha Seok-jin as Lee Young-gyun
- Kil Yong-woo as Yoon Won-seob
- Kim Hye-sun as Kim Soon-jung
- Lee Kyung-jin as Yoon Won-ja
- Im Hyun-sik as Lee Kwi-nam
- Lee Hye-sook as Kim Bo-bae
- Park Soo-young as Lee Jin-gyu
- In Gyo-jin (Note: Credited as Do Yi-sung.) as Lee Sung-ryong
- Lee Kyu-han as Lee Il-bong
- Yu Lia as Lee Ji-mi
- Choi Jong-hwan as Seo In-ho
- Nam Il-woo as Seo Dae-sa
- Lee Seung-hyung as Son Jung-mo
- Im Tae-yeol as Han-yi
- Seo Yoo-jung as Hyun-sook
- Kim So-yeon as Da-jung
- Park Se-young as Seo Yoo-jin
- Jung Min as Ji-ho
- Shin Da-eun as Oh Soo-jung
- Yoo Kyung-ah as department head
- Lee Sun-ah as Yang Mi-hee
- Kim So-won as Park Ji-young
