= Moon Geun-young =

South Korean actress (born 1987)

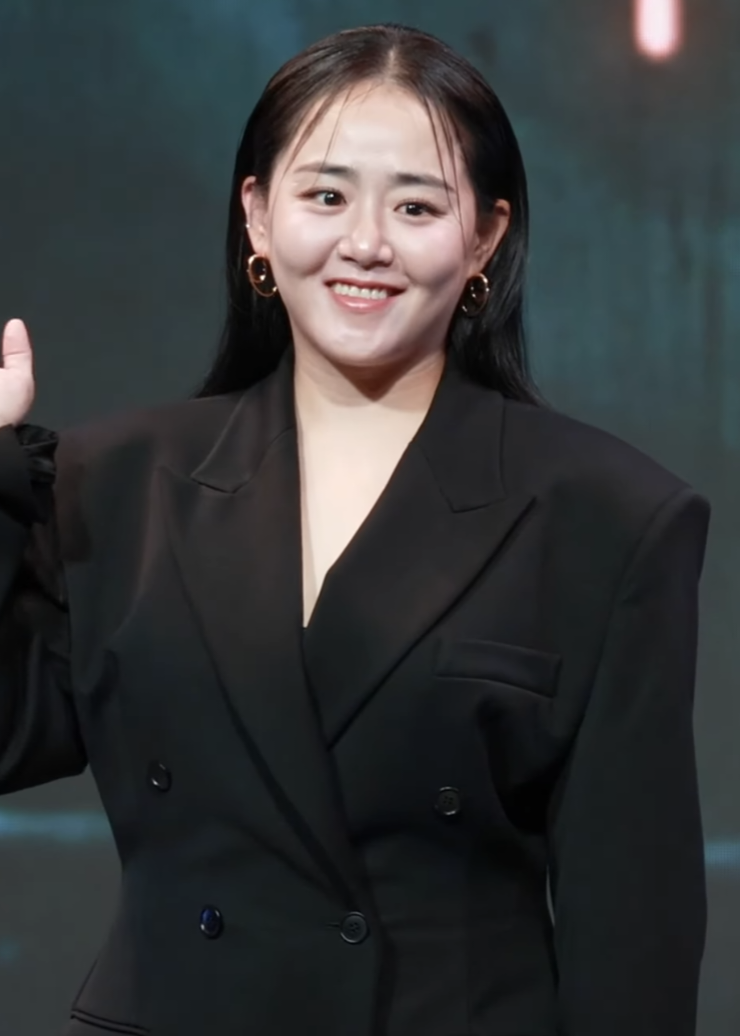
- Moon in October 2024
- Born: May 6, 1987 (age 39); Gwangju, South Korea
- Education: Sungkyunkwan University
- Occupations: Actress; director
- Years active: 1997–present
- Agent: Cree Company
- Spouse: Jung Pyeong (m. 2026)

Korean name
- Hangul: 문근영
- Hanja: 文瑾瑩
- RR: Mun Geunyeong
- MR: Mun Kŭnyŏng

Moon Geun-young (Korean: 문근영; born May 6, 1987) is a South Korean actress. Affectionately called the "Nation's Little Sister", Moon began modeling at the age of 10, then made her acting debut in 1999 as a child actress. She first rose to stardom through her role as the young Eun-suh in the hugely popular television drama series Autumn in My Heart (2000), followed by a well-received turn in Kim Jee-woon's critically acclaimed horror film A Tale of Two Sisters (2003). Moon solidified her star status by headlining the box-office hit My Little Bride (2004). At age 21, she became the youngest recipient of a Grand Prize ("Daesang") which she won at SBS Drama Awards for the television series Painter of the Wind (2008).

== Career ==
=== 1999–2002: Early career ===
Before her acting debut on a television drama series, Moon filmed several commercials and modeled for various magazines. She started modeling at the age of 12, and first appeared onscreen on the 1999 documentary drama On the Road directed by Choi Jae-eun. Moon's rise to fame came in 2000 when she starred as the younger counterpart of Song Hye-kyo's character in the pan-Asia hit drama Autumn in My Heart. She won the Best Young Actress award at the 2000 KBS Drama Awards for her role, together with her co-star Choi Woo-hyuk.

Following her early success, she returned to the screen in 2001 as the young Empress Myeongseong (Lee Mi-yeon played the adult version) in the historical drama Empress Myeongseong. In 2002, Moon made her film debut in Lovers' Concerto, playing a supporting role as Cha Tae-hyun's younger sister.

=== 2003–2007: Breakthrough ===
Moon was launched as a major star with her role in Kim Jee-woon's critically acclaimed horror film A Tale of Two Sisters (2003). A Tale of Two Sisters ranks among the highest-grossing Korean horror films and was the first to be screened in American theaters.

In 2004, Moon headlined the romantic comedy film My Little Bride. It was the second most popular Korean film of the year, behind the blockbuster hit Taegukgi. In the film, Moon plays an ordinary high school girl who has to marry an older man (played by Kim Rae-won) due to a pact their grandfathers made during the Korean War. Following the release of My Little Bride, the press gave Moon the title "Nation's Little Sister".

In 2005, Moon starred in Innocent Steps where she played the role of an ethnic Korean living in China, who finds herself to be a complete fish out of water after moving to South Korea. Innocent Steps was a hit, and its success along with My Little Bride established Moon as a genuine box office draw. That year, Moon ranked first among actresses in the Korean film industry as the most bankable star. Moon and actor Cho Seung-woo also received the 2005 Good Model award from the Korea Advertisers Association; 200 members voted for the winners based on how much they contributed to boosting the sales of products and enhancing the image of advertisers.

In 2006, Moon starred in Love Me Not, a Korean big-screen remake of popular Japanese TV drama Ai nante iranee yo, natsu ("I Don't Need Love, Summer"), where she played a cold-hearted blind heiress. Later that year, Moon and veteran actor Ahn Sung-ki hosted the 2006 Pusan International Film Festival (PIFF), the biggest international film festival in South Korea.

=== 2008–present: Acting acclaim ===
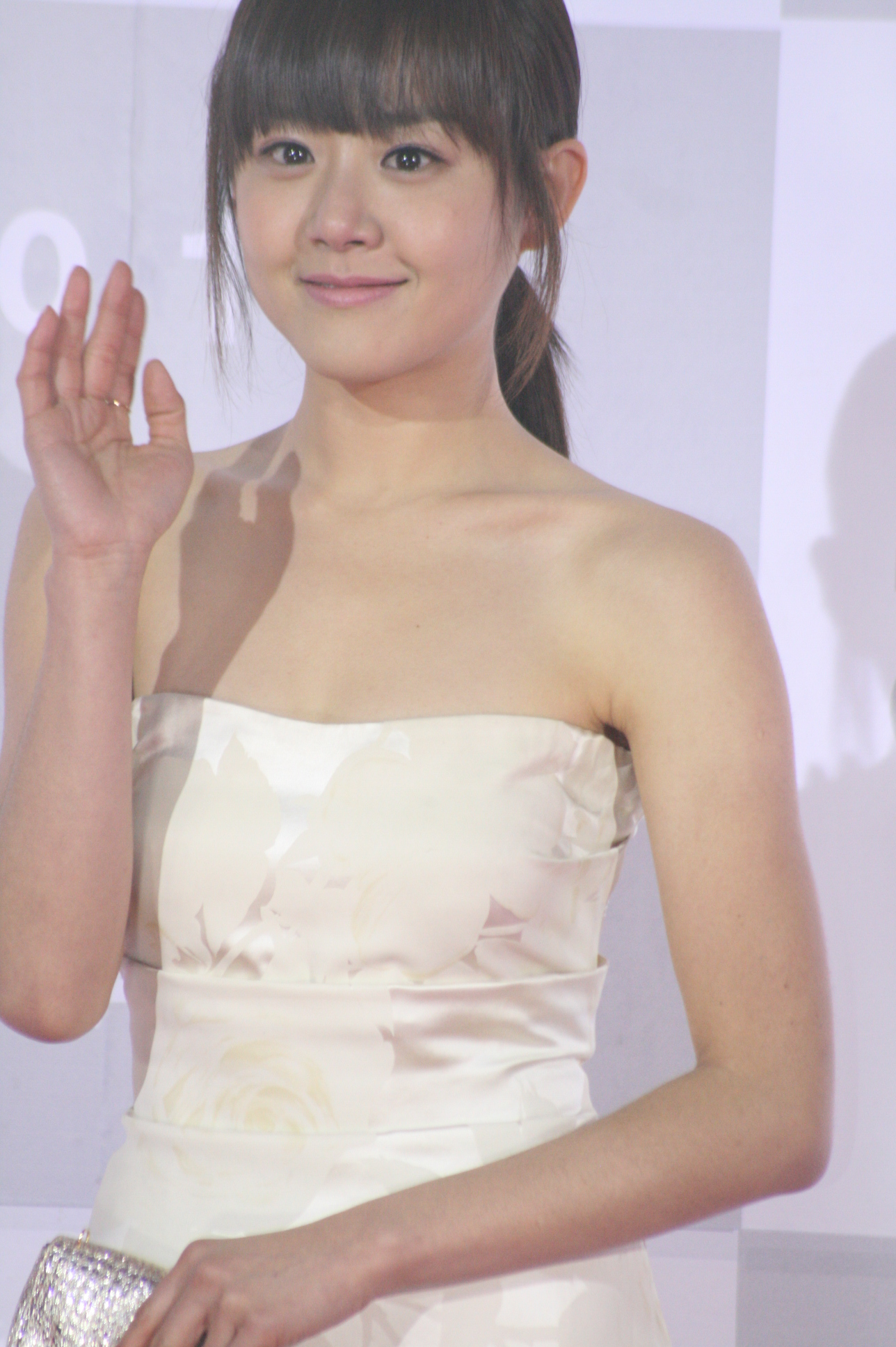
Moon at the 2010 KBS Drama Awards

In 2008, Moon returned to television in the period epic Painter of the Wind, where she played the lead role of Shin Yun-bok, a painter who disguises herself as a man and becomes mentored by the master Kim Hong-do (played by Park Shin-yang). Shin was a real-life historical figure, a painter who lived during the Joseon period (1392–1910) and was known for his realistic and delicate depictions of daily life. Moon received acting acclaim for her performance, including Best Actress at the 2008 Grimae Awards (presented by the Korean Broadcasting Directors Association), Best TV Actress at the 45th Baeksang Arts Awards, and the Daesang ("Grand Prize") at the 2008 SBS Drama Awards, making her the youngest recipient of a Daesang in the drama awards history of all three networks.

In 2010, Moon starred in Cinderella's Sister, a modern fairy tale retelling of the contentious relationship between two stepsisters (opposite Seo Woo). Later in the year, she starred in the romantic comedy Mary Stayed Out All Night alongside Jang Keun-suk. 2010 also marked the year she made her theater debut, in the Korean staging of Patrick Marber's play Closer. She caused a stir as the strip dancing, promiscuous Alice, opposite Um Ki-joon's Dan.

Moon returned to TV, playing a struggling young designer in Cheongdam-dong Alice (2012). She then starred in Goddess of Fire (2013), playing Yoo Jung, a character based on Baek Pa-sun, the first female potter and porcelain artist of the Joseon period. This is her second historical drama (or sageuk), five years after Painter of the Wind.

Moon made her long-awaited return to the big screen in Lee Joon-ik's period film The Throne, in which she played Lady Hyegyŏng, the wife of Crown Prince Sado. This is followed by the mystery thriller series The Village: Achiara's Secret.

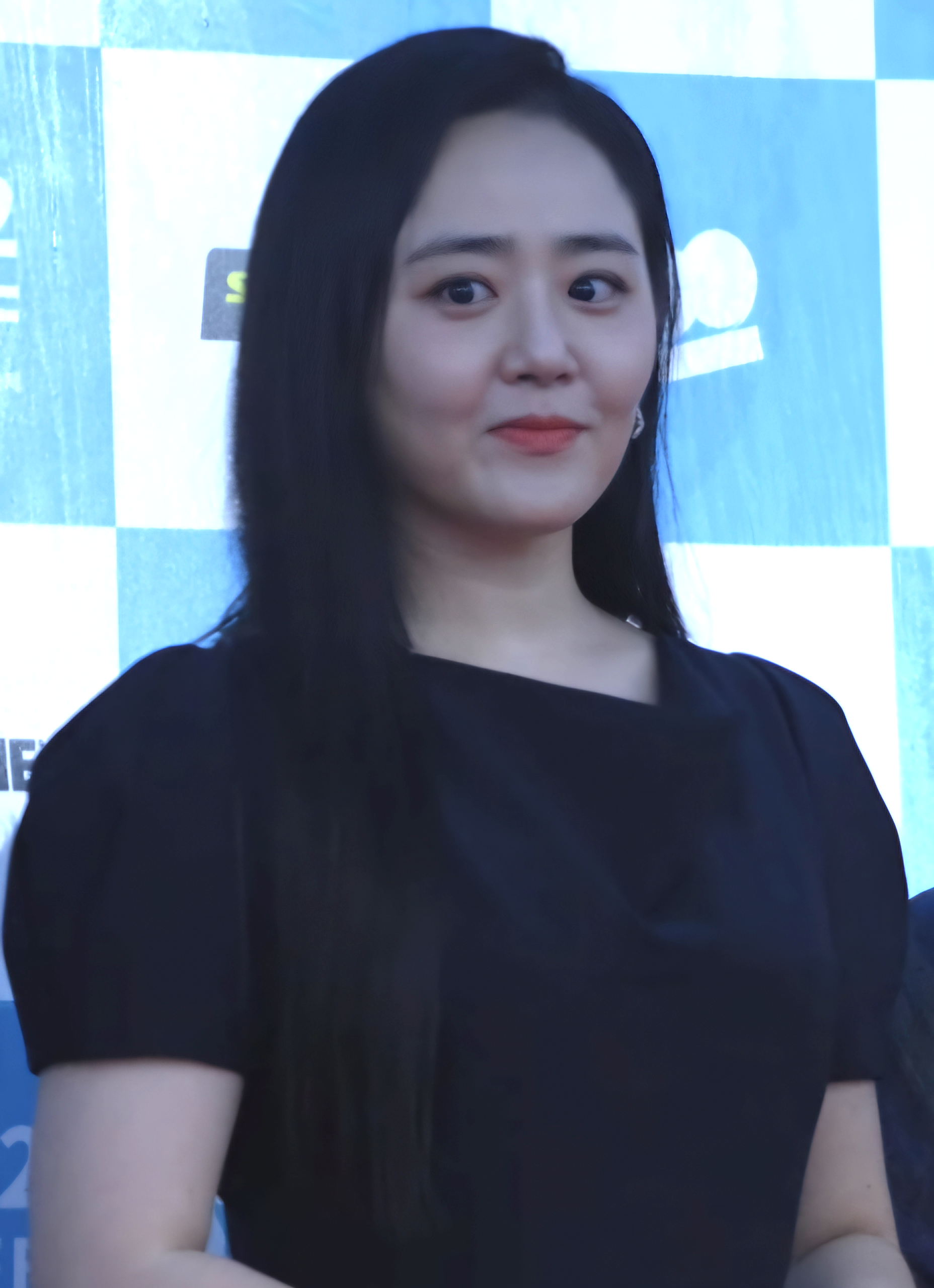
Moon at the JIMFF in 2022

In 2016, Moon starred in her second theater play, Romeo and Juliet alongside Park Jeong-min. She was also cast in the mystery film Glass Garden, which premiered at the Busan International Film Festival in 2017.

In 2019, Moon was confirmed to make her small-screen comeback in the tvN's crime drama Catch the Ghost.

In 2022, Moon signed a contract with Cree Company.

== Personal life ==
=== Education ===
Moon graduated from Gwangju Gukje High School in February 2006. In March 2006, she entered Sungkyunkwan University in Seoul. Moon was known for being a diligent student and had a solid attendance record, a rarity among Korean celebrities in college. She studied Korean Language and Literature.

=== Relationships ===
Their agencies confirmed that Moon dated her Goddess of Fire co-star Kim Bum for seven months, from October 2013 to April 2014. Not long after agencies of both actors confirmed the news stating: "They did break up not too long ago but have decided to remain good friends and supportive colleagues".

On July 29, 2026, Moon's agency confirmed that she has recently married musical actor Jung Pyeong.

=== Health ===
Moon was diagnosed with compartment syndrome, and received emergency treatments to treat her arm muscle pain.

== Philanthropy ==
=== Morning Reading ===
Moon donated close to ₩100 million to Morning Reading, a non-profit organization that promotes reading books. She gave ₩4.3 million in 2005, ₩4 million in 2006 and ₩70 million in 2007. Moon made the contributions secretly through her mother, Ryu Seon-young, but her good deeds became known when Morning Reading revealed its 2007 account information online.

=== Community Chest of Korea ===
Moon donated more than ₩850 million over the last ten years to the Community Chest of Korea, a nationwide network of 16 nonprofit fundraising organizations, becoming the biggest individual donor. Moon had wanted to remain an anonymous donor, but the organization was pressured by a media frenzy to identify her. Her donations were used to build children's libraries and subsidize hospital costs for children suffering from leukemia or cancer. Apart from the Community Chest of Korea, Moon has also given several hundred millions of won to scholarship foundations.

Because of her charitable activities, particularly for the Community Chest of Korea, Moon was selected among 100 people that "lit up the world" in 2008 in a survey conducted by the Korea Green Foundation.

=== Hangeul Library in Sydney ===
Moon again showed her generosity by building a Korean library for young Korean expatriates in Australia. Working with the Lindfield Korean School in Sydney, the actress donated ₩100 million towards construction of a permanent Korean library (called the Hangeul Library) and also donated 10,000 books to over 40 Korean schools scattered across the city. Moon has been donating books with her own money since 2006, when she saw during a visit to her relatives in Australia how young Korean students there did not have enough books or places to learn Korean.

=== Donated Haenam Children's Center to NGO Group ===
In April 2009, Moon donated the Haenam Children's Center to be used as a study room for poor students to the NGO group Good People, an international charity group of UN UCOSCO special consultative status aiming to improve self-sustainability and eradicate extreme poverty through restoration of self-esteem using the principles of human dignity and equality at a global level.

== Filmography ==
=== Film ===
==== As an actor ====
Year	Title	Role
1999	On The Way (documentary)	
2002	Lovers' Concerto	Lee Ji-yoon
2003	A Tale of Two Sisters	Bae Su-yeon
2004	My Little Bride	Seo Bo-eun
2005	Innocent Steps	Jang Chae-rin
2006	Love Me Not	Ryu Min
2015	The Throne	Lady Hyegyŏng
2017	Glass Garden	Jae-yoon
TBA	Yeto	Sua

==== As a director ====
Year	Title	Role	Notes	Ref.
2022	Abyss	Director	Short Film; It will premiere at the 26th BIFAN.	
2022	The Stage	Director	Short Film; It will premiere at the 26th BIFAN.	
2022	Be In My Dream	Director	Short Film; It will premiere at the 26th BIFAN.	

=== Television series ===
Year	Title	Role
1999	Burnt Rice Teacher and Seven Potatoes	Han Mi-soo
2000	Autumn in My Heart	young Yoon/Choi Eun-suh
2000	Medical Center	dying young singer (guest appearance, episode 15)
2001	Empress Myeongseong	Min Ja-yeong (young Empress Myeongseong)
2001	Life is Beautiful	young Yoo Hee-jung
2003	Wife	Han Min-ju
2008	Painter of the Wind	Shin Yun-bok
2010	Cinderella's Stepsister	Go Eun-jo/Song Eun-jo
2010	Marry Me, Mary!	Wi Mae-ri
2012	Cheongdam-dong Alice	Han Se-kyung
2013	Goddess of Fire	Yoo Jung
2015	The Village: Achiara's Secret	Han So-yoon
2016	Entourage	Cameo
2019	Catch the Ghost	Yoo Ryeong / Yoo Jin
2021	KBS Drama Special: "Abyss"	Oh Eun-soo

=== Web series ===
Year	Title	Role	Notes	Ref.
2024	Hellbound	Ms. Sunshine	Cameo (Season 2)	

=== Variety show ===
Year	Title	Role	Ref.
2019	Those Who Cross the Line – Season 2	Cast member	

== Theater ==
Theater play performances
Year	Title		Role	Venue	Date	Ref.
Year	English	Korean	Role	Venue	Date	Ref.
2010	Closer	클로저	Alice	Art One Theatre 1	August 6 to October 10	
2010	Closer	클로저	Alice	Gyeonggi Art Centre Grand Theatre	October 23 to 24	
2010	Closer	클로저	Alice	Daegu Student Culture Center Grand Hall	October 30 to 31	
2016–2017	Romeo and Juliet	로미오와 줄리엣	Juliet	National Theater Daloreum Theater	December 9–January 13	
2017	Romeo and Juliet	로미오와 줄리엣	Juliet	Gunpo Culture and Arts Center Suri Hall (Grand Performance Hall)	January 21–22	
2017	Romeo and Juliet	로미오와 줄리엣	Juliet	Woosong Arts Center Daejeon	February 4–5	
2017	Romeo and Juliet	로미오와 줄리엣	Juliet	Suseong Artpia Paper Hall Daegu	February 23–24	
2017	Romeo and Juliet	로미오와 줄리엣	Juliet	Andong Culture and Arts Center Woongbu Hall	February 25–26	

== Discography ==
=== Singles ===
Year	Title	Album
2004	"I Don't Know About Love Yet"	My Little Bride OST
2005	"Night-Blooming Jasmine" (야래향)	Innocent Steps OST
2005	"You don't know" (그댄 몰라요)	Innocent Steps OST
2010	"Sound of the Wind"	Love Tree Project

== Accolades ==
=== Awards and nominations ===
Year	Award	Category	Nominated work	Result	Ref.
2000	KBS Drama Awards	Best Young Actress	Autumn in My Heart	Won	
2003	24th Blue Dragon Film Awards	Best New Actress	A Tale of Two Sisters	Nominated	
2004	41st Grand Bell Awards	Best New Actress	My Little Bride	Won	
2004	41st Grand Bell Awards	Popularity Award	My Little Bride	Won	
2004	12th Chunsa Film Art Awards	Best New Actress	My Little Bride	Won	
2004	3rd Korean Film Awards	Best New Actress	My Little Bride	Nominated	
2004	25th Blue Dragon Film Awards	Popular Star Award		Won	
2004	6th Mnet Asian Music Awards	Best OST	"I Don't Know About Love Yet" (My Little Bride)	Nominated	
2005	5th Korea World Youth Film Festival	Favorite Actress	—N/a	Won	
2005	42nd Grand Bell Awards	Best Actress	Innocent Steps	Nominated	
2005	42nd Grand Bell Awards	Popularity Award	Innocent Steps	Won	
2006	29th Golden Cinematography Awards	Best Actress	Innocent Steps	Won	
2006	6th Korea World Youth Film Festival	Favorite Actress	—N/a	Won	
2007	44th Grand Bell Awards	Best Actress	Love Me Not	Nominated	
2007	7th Korea World Youth Film Festival	Favorite Actress	—N/a	Won	
2008	21st Grimae Awards	Best Actress	Painter of the Wind	Won	
2008	SBS Drama Awards	Grand Prize (Daesang)	Painter of the Wind	Won	
2008	SBS Drama Awards	Top Excellence Award, Actress	Painter of the Wind	Nominated	
2008	SBS Drama Awards	Best Couple Award with Moon Chae-won	Painter of the Wind	Won	
2008	SBS Drama Awards	Top 10 Stars	Painter of the Wind	Won	
2009	4th Seoul International Drama Awards	Best Actress	Painter of the Wind	Nominated	
2009	4th Seoul International Drama Awards	Popularity Award	Painter of the Wind	Won	
2009	45th Baeksang Arts Awards	Best Actress (TV)	Painter of the Wind	Won	
2010	6th Golden Ticket Awards	Best Actress in a Play	Closer	Won	
2010	Yahoo! Asia Buzz Awards	Female Buzz Star Award	Mary Stayed Out All Night	Won	
2010	3rd Korea Drama Awards	Best Actress	Cinderella's Sister	Nominated	
2010	KBS Drama Awards	Top Excellence Award, Actress	Cinderella's Sister, Mary Stayed Out All Night	Won	
2010	KBS Drama Awards	Popularity Award	Cinderella's Sister, Mary Stayed Out All Night	Won	
2010	KBS Drama Awards	Excellence Award, Actress in a Mid-length Drama	Cinderella's Sister	Nominated	
2010	KBS Drama Awards	Best Couple Award with Jang Keun-suk	Mary Stayed Out All Night	Won	
2011	6th Seoul International Drama Awards	Outstanding Korean Actress	Mary Stayed Out All Night	Won	
2011	47th Baeksang Arts Awards	Most Popular Actress (TV)	Cinderella's Sister	Won	
2013	SBS Drama Awards	Top Excellence Award, Actress in a Miniseries	Cheongdam-dong Alice	Nominated	
2013	MBC Drama Awards	Top Excellence Award, Actress in a Special Project Drama	Goddess of Fire	Nominated	
2015	SBS Drama Awards	Excellence Award, Actress in a Miniseries	The Village: Achiara's Secret	Won	
2015	SBS Drama Awards	Top 10 Stars	The Village: Achiara's Secret	Won	
2018	2nd Malaysia Golden Global Awards	Best Actress	Glass Garden	Nominated	
2022	Women in Film Korea Festival	Kang Soo-yeon Award	Abyss, The Stage, Be In My Dream	Won	
2025	Director's Cut Awards	Best New Actress (Series)	Hellbound 2	Won	

=== Listicles ===
Name of publisher, year listed, name of listicle, and placement
Publisher	Year	Listicle	Placement	Ref.
Forbes	2011	Korea Power Celebrity 40	34th	
Korean Film Council	2021	Korean Actors 200 (Note: Introduces 200 actors that best represent the present and future of Korean cinema to the people in the film industry all over the world)	Included	
