= Happy Together (South Korean TV series) =

1999 South Korean television series

- Genre: Drama; Family; Romance
- Created by: Kim Soo-ryong
- Written by: Bae Yoo-mi
- Directed by: Oh Jong-rok
- Starring: Lee Byung-hun; Song Seung-heon; Kim Ha-neul; Jo Min-su; Kang Sung-yeon; Jun Ji-hyun; Cha Tae-hyun
- Country of origin: South Korea
- Original language: Korean
- No. of seasons: 1
- No. of episodes: 16

Production
- Running time: approximately 60 minutes Wednesdays and Thursdays at 21:55 (KST)

Original release
- Network: SBS TV
- Release: June 16 – August 5, 1999

Happy Together (Korean: 해피 투게더; RR: Haepi tugedeo) is a 1999 South Korean television series. It has an ensemble cast, starring Lee Byung-hun, Song Seung-heon, Kim Ha-neul, Jo Min-su, Kang Sung-yeon, Jun Ji-hyun, Cha Tae-hyun, and Cho Jae-hyun It aired on SBS from June 16 to August 5, 1999 on Wednesdays and Thursdays at 21:55 for 16 episodes. Starring young actors who would go on to become Korean TV and film stars, the hit drama revolves around five children who were separated at the death of their parents, and the love, conflicts, and reconciliation that these siblings go through when they meet again as adults.

== Plot ==
After the tragic death of their parents, the lives of five siblings are irrevocably changed when they are separated. Now grown up, Seo Tae-poong (Lee Byung-hun) is a professional baseball player. Longing to bring his family back together, the kind-hearted Tae-poong has been searching his whole life for his brother and three sisters.

Tae-poong's older sister Seo Chan-joo (Jo Min-su) has been supporting her younger siblings Moon-joo (Kang Sung-yeon), and Ji-suk (Song Seung-heon), who is newly engaged to his girlfriend Jin Soo-ha (Kim Ha-neul). When Tae-poong finds Chan-joo, Ji-suk and Moon-joo, his estranged siblings want nothing to do with him. Reeling from their coldness, Tae-poong must also deal with an eight-year-old boy who claims to be his son. Not knowing what to do, Tae-poong turns to Chan-joo for help. Meanwhile, youngest sister of the family Seo Yoon-joo (Jun Ji-hyun) has found her big brother Tae-poong after detachment of 10 years but is saddened when he could not recognise her.

== Cast ==
- Lee Byung-hun as Seo Tae-poong
- Song Seung-heon as Seo Ji-suk
- Kim Ha-neul as Jin Soo-ha
- Jo Min-su as Seo Chan-joo
- Kang Sung-yeon as Seo Moon-joo
- Jun Ji-hyun as Seo Yoon-joo
- Cha Tae-hyun as Ha Shin-yeob
- Cho Jae-hyun as Jo Pil-doo
- Han Go-eun as Chae-rim
- Seo Beom-shik
- Jo Yeon-hee as Joo Hee-ju
- Oh Mi-yeon
- Son Hyun-joo as Park Ha
- Shim Yang-hong
- Park In-hwan as Soo-ha's father
