= Kang Sung-yeon =

South Korean actress (born 1976)

- Born: July 21, 1976 (age 50); Seoul, South Korea
- Education: Seoul Institute of the Arts – Broadcasting and Entertainment; Hannam University – Child and Social Welfare
- Occupations: Actress; singer
- Years active: 1996–present
- Agent: Great Company
- Spouse: Kim Ka-on (m. 2012; div. 2023)
- Children: 2

Korean name
- Hangul: 강성연
- RR: Gang Seongyeon
- MR: Kang Sŏngyŏn

Kang Sung-yeon (Korean: 강성연; born July 21, 1976) is a South Korean actress. She made her acting debut in 1996 through MBC's Open Recruitment. Although her main profession was acting, she also contributed songs to several soundtracks and released two albums between 2001 and 2002 under the stage name Bobo. Kang rose to fame in 2005 for her role as Prince Yeonsan's concubine Jang Nok-su in The King and the Clown, a period film that drew 12.3 million admissions, making it (at the time) the highest-grossing domestic film in Korean cinema history. Kang continued to star in television dramas such as Let's Get Married (2005), New Wise Mother, Good Wife (2007), Single Dad in Love (2008), Tazza (2008), and Wife Returns (2009). From 2012 to 2014, she hosted her own poetry reading program on EBS Radio.

== Personal life ==
Kang married jazz pianist Kim Ka-on on January 6, 2012. She announced her pregnancy in July 2014. In December 2023, the couple announced their divorce.

== Filmography ==
=== Television series ===
| Year | Title | Role |
|---|---|---|
| 1997 | Medical Brothers | Thoracic surgery nurse at Gangneung hospital |
| 1997 | The Reason I Live | Myung-hwa |
| 1998 | Love Is All I Know | Female detective |
| 1998 | Three Guys and Three Girls | Song Seung-soon |
| 1998 | Forever Yours | Jang Yoo-ri |
| 1998 | My Love by My Side | Na Chang-mi |
| 1999 | KAIST | Min Kyung-jin |
| 1999 | Happy Together | Seo Moon-joo |
| 1999 | Assignable Appearance | Jin Dal-rae |
| 1999 | Woman on Top | Lee Mi-nam |
| 2000 | Virtue | Jung Kwi-jin |
| 2000 | Rookie | Na Jin-shim |
| 2001 | Well Known Woman | Lee Jung-nim |
| 2002 | That Woman Catches People | Han Bok-nyeo |
| 2003 | She's Cool! | Ha Hye-kyung |
| 2005 | Let's Get Married | Hong Na-young |
| 2007 | New Wise Mother, Good Wife | Kyung Gook-hee |
| 2008 | Single Dad in Love | Yoon So-yi |
| 2008 | Tazza | Madam Jeong |
| 2009 | Wife Returns | Jung Yoo-hee/Jung Yoo-kyung |
| 2015 | The Great Wives | Yoo Ji-yeon |
| 2019 | Mother of Mine | Na Hye-mi |
| 2020 | She Knows Everything | Lee Goong-bok |
| 2024 | Flex X Cop | Baek Sang-hee (episode 9–10) |

=== Film ===
| Year | Title | Role |
|---|---|---|
| 2005 | Short Time | Kim Young-sook |
| 2005 | The King and the Clown | Jang Nok-su |
| 2007 | Cast a Spell | Lee Ji-hye |
| 2007 | Soo | Kang Mi-na |

=== Variety/radio show ===
| Year | Title | Notes |
|---|---|---|
| 1999 | Super TV Sunday Fun | MC |
| 2008 | Love Generation | MC |
| 2011 | F.B.I. | MC |
| 2011 | Find! Delicious TV | MC |
| 2012 | Now on My Way to Meet You | MC |
| 2012–2014 | Poetry Concert | DJ |
| 2012 | Fairy Tales for Adults | DJ |
| 2016 | Two Yoo Project Sugar Man | Sugar Man (Ep 17) |
| 2016 | Singderella | MC |
| 2018 | King of Mask Singer | Contestant (Uparupa) |

== Discography ==
| Album information | Track listing |
|---|---|
| "내 안에 또 다른 나" (Another Different Me Inside): Track from The Reason I Live OST; Released: July 1997; Label: MBC 예술단, Tan Entertainment | Track listing: 07. 내 안에 또 다른 나 |
| "별(경진 테마)" (Stars (Contest Theme)): Track from KAIST 2000 OST; Released: February 2, 2000; Label: | Track listing: 04. 별(경진 테마) |
| Bobo: Album; Released: December 6, 2001; Label: Seoul Records | Track listing: 1. 늦은 후회; 2. 긴 기다림; 3. 가가; 4. Because; 5. 잊어; 6. Question; 7. 꿈 8. 가버려; 9. Here by My Side; 10. Loving You; 11. 가버려 (Remix) |
| The Natural: Album; Released: November 25, 2002; Label: Seoul Records | Track listing: 1. Remember Me; 2. Alone; 3. 이별에게; 4. 마지막 겨울; 5. 내게로; 6. 예감했던 이별; 7. 몰랐었죠; 8. 이별과의 이별; 9. Bye Bye; 10. 가을비 우산속; 11. 청혼; 12. The Christmas Song; 13. 이별에게 (instrumental) |
| Perfect Silence: Artist: Blank & Jones feat. Bobo; Single; Released: June 21, 2004; Label: Warner Bros. Records, WM Germany | Track listing: 1. Perfect Silence (Martin Roth Hardtrance Rmx) |
| "미안해요" (I'm Sorry): Track from Let's Get Married OST; Released: December 21, 2005; Label: 만월당 | Track listing: 03. 미안해요 |
| "Reason (Female Ver.)": Track from Tazza OST; Released: October 10, 2008; Label: Doremi Media | Track listing: 05. Reason (Female Ver.) |
| "Perfect Silence (E-Craig's 212 Remix)": Artist: DJ Tiësto remix, Blank & Jones feat. Bobo; Track from In Search of Sunrise 4: Latin America; Released: December 14, 2009; Label: JMC Entertainment, Black Hole Recordings | Track listing: 14. Perfect Silence (E-Craig's 212 Remix) |

== Awards and nominations ==
| Year | Award | Category | Nominated work | Result |
|---|---|---|---|---|
| 1996 | MBC Drama Awards | Photogenic Award | —N/a | Won |
| 1998 | KBS Drama Awards | Best New Actress | My Love by My Side | Won |
| 1999 | SBS Drama Awards | Best New Actress | Happy Together | Won |
| 2000 | SBS Drama Awards | Excellence Award, Actress | Virtue, Rookie | Won |
| 2006 | 1st Dior Timeless Beauty Awards | Recipient | —N/a | Won |
| 2006 | 43rd Grand Bell Awards | Best Supporting Actress | The King and the Clown | Nominated |
| 2006 | 43rd Grand Bell Awards | Popularity Award | The King and the Clown | Won |
| 2006 | 27th Blue Dragon Film Awards | Best Supporting Actress | The King and the Clown | Nominated |
| 2006 | 27th Blue Dragon Film Awards | Popular Star Award | The King and the Clown | Won |
| 2006 | 5th Korean Film Awards | Best Supporting Actress | The King and the Clown | Nominated |
| 2008 | 1st Korea Jewelry Awards | Ruby Award | —N/a | Won |
| 2008 | SBS Drama Awards | Best Supporting Actress in a Special Planning Drama | Tazza | Nominated |
| 2010 | SBS Drama Awards | Excellence Award, Actress in a Serial Drama | Wife Returns | Won |
| 2015 | MBC Drama Awards | Top Excellence Award, Actress in a Serial Drama | The Great Wives | Nominated |
| 2020 | MBC Drama Awards | Top Excellence Award, Actress in a Monday-Tuesday Miniseries / Short Drama | She Knows Everything | Nominated |
