= Jo Min-ki =

South Korean actor (1965–2018)

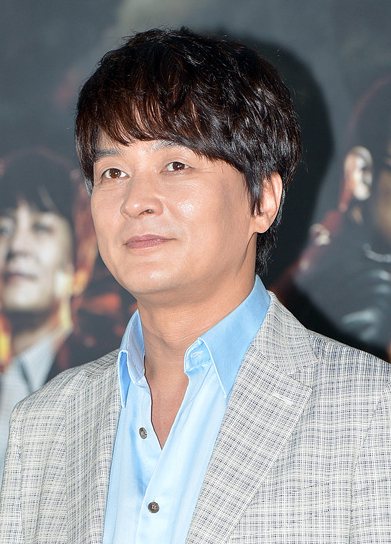
- Jo in 2012
- Born: November 5, 1965; Seoul, South Korea
- Died: March 9, 2018 (aged 52); Seoul, South Korea
- Cause of death: Suicide
- Other name: Cho Min-ki
- Education: Cheongju University - B.A. Theater and Film; Chung-Ang University Graduate School - Master's degree in Performing Arts
- Occupation: Actor
- Years active: 1990–2018
- Agent: Will Entertainment
- Spouse: Kim Sun-jin (m. 1991)
- Children: 2

Korean name
- Hangul: 조민기
- Hanja: 趙珉基
- RR: Jo Mingi
- MR: Cho Min'gi

Jo Min-ki (November 5, 1965 – March 9, 2018) was a South Korean actor. He is best known for his roles in the television series Love and Ambition, East of Eden, Queen Seondeok, and Flames of Desire. He was also a noted photographer and published two books and held solo exhibitions. In addition since 2010 he was an assistant professor at Cheongju University.

Following high-profile accusations of sexual misconduct from numerous students, Jo was found dead at an underground parking lot in Seoul in an apparent suicide on March 9, 2018.

== Controversy ==
On February 22, 2018, Jo Min-ki was accused of sexually harassing his students, which he initially denied. It was then revealed that he had resigned from a teaching post at Cheongju University, and dropped out of his upcoming drama Children of a Lesser God. A week later, Jo apologized and admitted to the allegations. It was confirmed that Jo would be investigated by the police and was due to turn himself in for questioning by Monday March 12, 2018. Shortly before his death, police announced that he was banned from leaving the country during the investigation. Following Jo's death, it was announced he had written and sent a written apology on February 26, however his agency decided not to release it and instead released an official statement of apology.

== Death ==
Jo was found dead from an apparent suicide by hanging on March 9, 2018, in an underground parking lot near his home in Gwangjin District of Seoul. Jo left a six-page suicide note in which he apologized to his family and students, although the police have declined to release the full contents of the note. A private funeral was held for Jo at the Konkuk University Hospital Funeral Home in Seoul.

== Filmography ==
=== TV series ===
Year	Title	Original Title	Role	Ref.
1992	MBC Best Theater - Reason to Love Someone	MBC 베스트 극장 - 누군가 사랑하려는 이유	Young Seop	
1993	Pilot	파일럿	Korean Air cabin crew	
1994	Ambition	야망		
1994	General Hospital	종합병원		
1994	Kareisky	까레이스키		
1995	TV City	TV시티		
1995	Jazz	째즈	Yoon Ba-da	
1995	My Love Yoo-mi	내 사랑 유미	Cha Dong-hyuk	
1996	Star	별	Song Ma-ru	
1996	City Men	도시남녀	Yoo Jin-ha	
1996	MBC Best Theater - Yeo Woon-po serenade	MBC 베스트 극장 - 여운포 세레나데		
1996	Mother's Flag	엄마의 깃발	Kim Seung-joon	
1996	When Salmon Returns	연어가 돌아올 때	Lee Kang-jae	
1997	SBS 70-minute Drama - After Love	SBS 70분드라마 - 사랑한 후에	In Jae	
1997	Tears of Roses	장미의 눈물	Joo Young-mo	
1997	SBS 70-minute Drama - Bicycle Thief	70분드라마 - 자전거 도둑		
1997	White Christmas	Yoon-ho		
1998	SBS 70-minute Drama - Dad Waiting for the Kindergarten Bus	SBS 70분드라마 - 유치원 버스를 기다리는 아빠		
1998	Love	사랑	Nam Joon-ho	
1998	Partner	파트너	Han Kang-woo	
1998	Summer Horror Special - One day Suddenly	납량특선 8부작 - 어느날 갑자기	Han Seung	
1998	Seven Brides for Seven Brothers	7인의 신부	Jang Goo	
1998	Blushing with Love	수줍은 연인	이현철 Lee Hyun-chul	
1998	Angel's Kiss	천사의 키스	Lee Muk-hyeon	
1999	Ad Madness	광끼	Kim Nam-jin	
1999	You Don't Know My Mind	남의 속도 모르고	CEO Noh	
1999	MBC Best Theater - Old love	MBC 베스트 극장 - 옛사랑	Jung Joon	
2000	The World's Morning	세상의 아침		
2000	Feels Good	느낌이 좋아	Kang Sung-joo	
2000	Tough Guy's Love	꼭지	Song Joon-tae	
2000	Foolish Princes	온달 왕자들	Yeo Shi-woo	
2001	Open Drama Man & Woman	우리도 같은 꿈을 꾸는 걸까?	Tae-soo	
2001	School 4	학교 4	Jung Ji-seok, music teacher	
2001	Sweet Bear	반달곰 내 사랑	Kim Hyung-joon	
2001	Everyday with You	매일 그대와	Jo Tae-woo	
2002	Hard Love	거침없는 사랑	Han Jung-hwan	
2002	Inspector Park Mun-su	어사 박문수	King Yeongjo	
2003	Yellow Handkerchief	노란 손수건	Jung Young-joon	
2003	While You Were Dreaming	그대 아직도 꿈꾸고 있는가	Kim Hyuk-joo	
2004	Immortal Admiral Yi Sun-sin	불멸의 이순신	King Seonjo	
2004	Wives on Strike	아내의 반란	Jo Joon-ki	
2006	Love and Ambition	사랑과 야망	Park Tae-joon	
2008	Iljimae	일지매	Lee Won-ho	
2008	East of Eden	에덴의 동쪽	Shin Tae-hwan	
2009	Queen Seondeok	선덕여왕	King Jinpyeong	
2009	Wife Returns	아내가 돌아왔다	Yoon Sang-woo	
2010	Dr. Champ	닥터챔프	Professor Seo (cameo appearance)	
2010	Flames of Desire	욕망의 불꽃	Kim Young-min	
2011	Me Too, Flower!	나도 꽃	Park Tae-hwa	
2012	Five Fingers	다섯손가락	Yoo Man-se (cameo appearance)	
2012	Dream of Three Men, Father	세 남자의 꿈, 아버지	Narrator	
2012	The Great Seer	대풍수	Lee In-im	
2013	Two Weeks	투윅스	Moon Il-seok	
2013	Golden Rainbow	황금 무지개	Seo Jin-ki	
2013	Drama Festival - Lee Sang That Lee Sang	MBC 드라마 페스티벌 - 이상 그 이상	Soo-young	
2015	Splendid Politics	화정	Kim Ja-jeom	
2015	Orange Marmalade	오렌지 마말레이드	Jung Byung-kwon	
2016	Moon Lovers: Scarlet Heart Ryeo	달의 연인 - 보보경심 려	King Taejo	

=== Variety shows ===
Year	Title	Original Title	Ref.
1999	Sunday Best	풍차 둘, 소라 하나	
2007	Jo Min-ki's Damage		
2011	Travel the World	세상의 모든 여행	
2011	Directors	디렉터스 시즌1	
2012	Top Gear Korea Season 2	탑 기어 코리아 시즌2	
2015	Take Care of My Dad	아빠를 부탁해	

=== Film ===
- The Attorney (2013) – Prosecutor Kang Young-cheol
- Love 911 (2012) – chief doctor (cameo appearance)
- A Piano on the Sea (2011)
- Astro Boy (2010) – Dr. Tenma (voice, Korean dubbing)
- The Cut (2007) – Professor Han Ji-woo
- Short Time (2005) – section head Jo (cameo appearance)
- First Kiss (1998) – Won-joong / Kyeong-dong
- Scent of a Man (1998) – Jung Chul-min
- The Girl for Love and The One for Marriage (1993) – Sung-min
- First Love (1993) – Kim Moon-soo
- A Foolish Lover (1992) – Han-il
- Death Song (1991) – Hong Hae-sung

== Theater ==
- Forest Fire (Korean: 산불; RR: Sanbul; 2011) - Gyubok
- A Midsummer Night's Dream (2009)
- The Seagull (2004, 2007) - Boris Alexeyevich Trigorin

== Discography ==
Album information	Track listing
ZIO: Album; Released: October 22, 2010; Label: Sonic스톤 / Yedang Company	Track listing: 1. Intro; 2. 사랑 그 후 3. 설레임; 4. Good Bye; 5. 사랑 그 후(MR)

== Bibliography ==
- Photo Album of Jo's Wandering (Korean: 조씨유랑화첩; 2008)
- Happy to Have Found You (Korean: 당신을 만나 행복합니다; 2005)

== Awards ==
- 2008 MBC Drama Awards: Excellence Award, Actor (East of Eden)
- 2007 Inter-Parliamentarians for Social Service: Special Volunteer Award
- 2002 KBS Drama Awards: Excellence Award, Actor (Hard Love)
- 2001 MBC Drama Awards: Excellence Award, Actor (Everyday with You, Sweet Bear)
- 1996 SBS Drama Awards: Excellence Award, Actor (City Men and Women)
