= Wife Returns =

- Promotional poster
- Also known as: Return of the Wife
- Genre: Drama; Family; Erotica Drama
- Written by: Lee Hye-sun
- Directed by: Lee Yong-seok
- Starring: Kang Sung-yeon; Jo Min-ki; Yoon Se-ah; Park Jung-chul; Kim Mu-yeol
- Country of origin: South Korea
- Original language: Korean
- No. of episodes: 116

Production
- Executive producer: Oh Se Sang
- Producers: Sung-cheol Sung; KimDong-jun; Lee Hyung suk kim hyung Jae
- Production companies: Golden Pine; Ace Company

Original release
- Network: Seoul Broadcasting System
- Release: November 2, 2009 – April 16, 2010

Wife Returns (Korean: 아내가 돌아왔다; RR: Anaega dorawatda; also known as My Wife is Back) is a South Korean television series starring Kang Sung-yeon, Jo Min-ki, Yoon Se-ah, Park Jung-chul, and Kim Mu-yeol. It aired on SBS from November 2, 2009 to April 16, 2010 on Mondays to Fridays at 19:20 for 116 episodes. The melodrama deals with a broken family, betrayal, adultery and revenge with a dash of violence. Wife Returns revolves around a woman who gets revenge on the husband of her identical twin sister. The sister was forced to leave her husband and their child by her mother-in-law.

The series was part of the "Wife Trilogy," which includes Temptation of Wife and Two Wives.

== Synopsis ==
Jung Yoo-hee (Kang Sung-yeon) grew up in an orphanage with her sister, but lost contact with her after she was adopted by foster parents who lived overseas. Her own foster parents stopped communicating with her after a length of time and Yoo-hee life was filled with unhappiness. That is until she met Yoon Sang-woo (Jo Min-ki), a man that swept her off of her feet. The couple ran away to an island and married. Soon they had a daughter, but their daughter became sick due to a heart disorder. Yoo-hee, desperate to save her daughter, turned to her mother-in-law, who offered to pay for her granddaughter's operation under one condition. That condition required Yoo-hee to leave Sang-woo and never come back. Yoo-hee, wanting to save her daughter's life, left Sang-woo. Sang-woo, unaware of the reasons why Yoo-hee left him, eventually remarried Min Seo-hyun (Yoon Se-ah). Han Kang-soo (Kim Mu-yeol) has loved Yoo-hee since they were children. He even proposed to her years before, but Yoo-hee said no and chose Sang-woo. After she leaves Sang-woo, Kang-soo comes back into Yoo-hee's life. They move to Seoul. Yoo-hee still can't forget Sang-woo and on one fateful day, she meets him once again.

== Characters ==
- Jung Yoo-hee was left in an orphanage with her little sister Yoo-kyung and she grew up protecting Yoo-kyung who has a weak heart. To undergo heart surgery at age 7, Yoo-kyung was adopted to America. Yoo-hee was also adopted by Gu Kyung-man and lost all contact with Yoo-kyung. She was ill-treated by her stepmother Do Do-hwa, and when Gu Kyung-man's business later collapsed, the adoption was canceled. As an adult she went on a trip, and met and fell in love with Sang-woo. They got married despite the objections of Sang-woo's mother Mrs. Park. She lived with Sang-woo on an island and gave birth to a daughter, Da-eun. But when Da-eun was diagnosed with a congenital heart disease, she made a deal with her mother-in-law that she would leave Sang-woo in exchange for Mrs. Park paying for Da-eun's medical care.
- Yoon Sang-woo is the ex-husband of Jung Yoo-hee. He grew up as the only son of a family that owned a mid-sized construction company. Though his parents wanted him to be the business successor, he became a botanist. After he fell in love with Yoo-hee, he cut relations with his parents and married her. He never knew the real reason why Yoo-hee left him. Though his new wife Seo-hyun treats Da-eun like her own daughter, he is not completely happy and is always thinking of Yoo-hee. When he met Yoo-hee again, he saw her being mistreated by Han Kang-soo, and his hatred disappears, replaced by some kind of pity. Half pity, half love, the relationship between Sang-woo and Yoo-hee begins again.
- Min Seo-hyun is a doctor, and the second wife of Sang-woo. She is a kind daughter who took care of her father and older brother, Min Young-hoon, after their mother died. Seo-hyun became a doctor according to the will of her father, and she is in charge of the hospital and foundation left to her by her mother. During a health service trip, she met Sang-woo and saved his daughter, Da-eun, then later married him.
- Min Young-hoon is the older brother of Min Seo-hyun, and the planning director of a construction company. When he witnessed his father having an affair and leaving his ill mother, the relationship between father and son became estranged. He went to America to study and enjoy life. When he came back to Korea, he happened to meet a girl who is orphaned and suffering from amnesia. He was touched by her plight, and he made an effort to find her parents as well as recovering her memories.
- Min Yi-hyun is the youngest daughter of chairman Mr. Min, and stepsister of Seo-hyun and Young-hoon. After Mr. Min's first wife died, she joined the Min family. When visiting a cafeteria, she met Han Kang-soo, a man wearing special eye glitter, and full of pride and bluster. With direct honesty he told her that her money attracts him, and Yi-hyun started to think that he's worth starting a relationship with.
- Han Kang-soo is an attractive but bad man. He lost his parents at an early age, but studied hard and was accepted into the construction company. But the sincere young man began to change after he was rejected by Yoo-hee, believing that she would've chosen him if he had money. He gets thrown in jail after embezzling money. After he was released, he went to the island to search for Yoo-hee and learned that she had left Sang-woo and gone back to Seoul. He tried to make a happy life with Yoo-hee, though he encountered prejudice due to his prison record. But he felt betrayed when Yoo-hee is unable to forget Sang-woo.

== Cast ==
- Kang Sung-yeon as Jung Yoo-hee / Jung Yoo-kyung
- Jo Min-ki as Yoon Sang-woo
- Yoon Se-ah as Min Seo-hyun
- Park Jung-chul as Min Young-hoon
- Lee Chae-young as Min Yi-hyun
- Kim Mu-yeol as Han Kang-soo
- Jeon Min-seo as Yoon Da-eun
- Jeon Bo-young as Kim Hyun-joo
- Sunwoo Eun-sook as Mrs. Park
- Kim Byung-ki as Min Sung-tae
- Lee Won-jae as Goo Kyung-man
- Kwon Ki-sun as Do Do-hwa
- Seo Dong-won as Park Young-bae
- Lee Sun-ah as Goo Dong-hee
- Kim Won-suk as Jang Ki-young
- Tae Hwang as Wie Yi-teo
- Kim Sung-oh as Kim Dong-cheol
- Lee Moo-saeng as Director Lee

== International broadcast ==
- The series premiered in the Philippines on following TV networks: December 15, 2013 on TeleAsia Chinese under the title Wife's Back, May 26, 2014 on GMA Network, under the title Return of the Wife and January 27, 2015 on TeleAsia Filipino under the same title.
- The series premiered in Myanmar on following MNTV networks :
