= Marry Me, Mary! =

2010 South Korean TV series

- Promotional poster
- Hangul: 매리는 외박중
- Hanja: 매리는 外泊中
- RR: Maerineun oebakjung
- MR: Maerinŭn oebakchung
- Genre: Romance; Comedy
- Based on: Mary Stayed Out All Night by Won Soo-yeon
- Written by: In Eun-ah (ep 1-10); Go Bong-hwang (ep 11-16)
- Directed by: Hong Suk-goo; Kim Young-kyun
- Starring: Moon Geun-young; Jang Keun-suk; Kim Jae-wook; Kim Hyo-jin
- Country of origin: South Korea
- Original language: Korean
- No. of episodes: 16

Production
- Executive producer: Jung Sung-hyo
- Producer: Han Sang-woo
- Running time: Mondays and Tuesdays at 21:55
- Production company: ACC Korea

Original release
- Network: Korean Broadcasting System
- Release: 8 November – 28 December 2010

Marry Me, Mary! (Korean: 매리는 외박중; RR: Maerineun oebakjung; lit. Mary Stayed Out All Night) is a 2010 South Korean romantic comedy television series, starring Moon Geun-young, Jang Keun-suk, Kim Jae-wook and Kim Hyo-jin. It is based on the Daum webtoon of the same title by Won Soo-yeon. It aired on KBS2 from November 8, to December 28, 2010, on Mondays and Tuesdays at 21:55 for 16 episodes.

== Synopsis ==
Wi Mae-ri (Moon Geun-young) is a stubborn young woman with no dating experience. She looks like her late mother, but her hot temper comes straight from her deadbeat father (Park Sang-myun). Her father's business failures always make trouble, but Mae-ri still loves him. Because she can't afford college tuition, she temporarily stops attending college, and without any special skills, starts to work odd jobs. One day, driving friends around as one of those jobs, she accidentally hits musician Kang Mu-gyul (Jang Keun-suk) and over a series of events, they become friends. Mae-ri's father proposes that she marry his rich friend's son Byun Jung-in (Kim Jae-wook) to pay off their debts. She refuses; when her father won't let her, and in fact forges the couple's signatures on a marriage registration, she pretends to have already married Mu-gyul. Instead of accepting that, her father proposes a deal: spend 100 days with both of them and afterwards, she can decide who she wants to marry. And from there, a love triangle forms...

== Cast ==
=== Main ===
- Moon Geun-young as Wi Mae-ri, Dae-han's daughter who has her father's hot temper and her mother's looks
- Jang Keun-suk as Kang Mu-gyul, Absolute Perfection lead singer and guitarist and Seo-joon's ex-boyfriend
- Kim Jae-wook as Byun Jung-in, head representative of JI Entertainment, a well-known drama company
- Kim Hyo-jin as Seo-joon, actress, Mu-gyul's ex-girlfriend

=== Supporting ===
- Park Jun-gyu as Jung-suk, Jung-in's father
- Park Sang-myun as Wi Dae-han, Mae-ri's father
- Lee Ah-hyun as Kam So-young, Mu-gyul's mother
- Shim Yi-young as Director Bang, Mu-gyul's former agent
- Lee Seon-ho as Lee An, male lead actor of drama Wonderful Day
- Kim Min-gyu as Ri-no, band member
- Geum Ho-suk as Yo-han, band member
- Park Chul-hyun as Re-oh, band member
- Lee Eun as So-ra as Mae-ri's friend
- Kim Hae-rim as Ji-hye as Mae-ri's friend
- Chae Min-hee as Jang PD
- Yoon Yoo-sun as drama writer

== Production ==
- Writer In Eun-ah left the drama due to its low ratings and discord with the production team. She was replaced with Go Bong-hwang, who took over the script from episode 11, which aired on December 14. The last episode was written by Jang Keun-suk.
- Co-stars Jang Keun-suk and Moon Geun-young held fan meetings on August 18 and 23, 2011 in Tokyo and Osaka, respectively, which were attended by 60,000 people.

== Ratings ==
Date	Episode	Nationwide	Seoul
2010-11-08	01	6.7%	7.3%
2010-11-09	02	7.0%	7.3% (20th)
2010-11-15	03	8.7% (15th)	8.8% (13th)
2010-11-16	04	7.0%	7.1% (20th)
2010-11-22	05	7.1% (19th)	7.2% (18th)
2010-11-29	06	6.6%	7.2%
2010-11-30	07	7.1%	7.4% (19th)
2010-12-06	08	5.6%	6.7%
2010-12-07	09	5.1%	6.5%
2010-12-13	10	5.6%	6.9%
2010-12-13	11	6.1%	7.2%
2010-12-14	12	5.0%	6.8%
2010-12-20	13	5.9%	6.9%
2010-12-21	14	5.9%	6.8%
2010-12-27	15	5.3%	6.6%
2010-12-28	16	6.6%	7.4%
average		6.3%	7.1%

Source: TNS Media Korea

== Awards ==
2010 KBS Drama Awards

- Netizens' Award - Jang Keun-suk
- Popularity Award - Moon Geun-young
- Best Couple Award - Moon Geun-young and Jang Keun-suk

2011 Seoul International Drama Awards

- Outstanding Korean Actress - Moon Geun-young
- Excellent Korean Drama - Marry Me, Mary!

== International broadcast ==
Despite low ratings in South Korea, the series was a huge hit in Japan in terms of both ratings and DVD sales. It aired there on cable channel DATV beginning February 16, 2011. This was followed by a popular run on terrestrial network TBS beginning May 20, 2011, due to the Korean Wave appeal of lead actor Jang Keun-suk.

It aired in the Middle East on MBC 4 beginning November 7, 2013, dubbed as Tazawajini ya Mary.

It aired in Thailand on Channel 7 beginning November 5, 2011, dubbed as Saojomjoon Kab Numindie, literally: Meddle Girl & Indie Boy.

It is currently airing in Chile on ETC Channel beginning May 15, 2017, dubbed as "Mary Está Fuera Por La Noche".
