= Flames of Desire =

2010–2011 South Korean television series

- Promotional poster for Flames of Desire
- Also known as: Flames of Ambition
- Hangul: 욕망의 불꽃
- Hanja: 慾望의/欲望의 불꽃
- RR: Yongmangui bulkkot
- MR: Yongmangŭi pulkkot
- Genre: Melodrama
- Created by: MBC; Wonyoung So
- Written by: Jung Ha-yeon
- Directed by: Baek Ho-min
- Starring: Shin Eun-kyung; Seo Woo; Yoo Seung-ho; Jo Min-ki; Lee Soon-jae
- Music by: Choi Wan-hee (Praha)
- Country of origin: South Korea
- Original language: Korean
- No. of episodes: 50

Production
- Executive producer: Im Hwamin
- Producer: Min Hee-woong Jincheon Kim Wontae Oh
- Running time: 60 minutes
- Production companies: Flames of Desire SPC; Nuruk Production Co.

Original release
- Network: MBC
- Release: October 2, 2010 – March 27, 2011

Flames of Desire (Korean: 욕망의 불꽃; RR: Yongmangui bulkkot; lit. 'Flames of Ambition') is a South Korean television series starring Shin Eun-kyung, Seo Woo, Yoo Seung-ho, Jo Min-ki, and Lee Soon-jae. It aired on MBC from October 2, 2010, to March 27, 2011, on Saturdays and Sundays at 21:45 for 50 episodes.

The early working title was A Woman Only Loves Once in a Lifetime (여자는 일생에 단 한번 사랑한다).

== Plot ==
This is the story of a conglomerate family that falls apart when the members are caught up in a furious battle for succession. Kim Tae-jin's children all covet his fortune and the power that he possesses as the company president, and they would do anything, however cruel and inhumane, to wrest it from the others. At the forefront of this desperate game is Yoon Na-young, the ruthless and ambitious wife of Kim Young-min, Tae-jin's third son. Her unquenchable thirst for power and wealth drives her to the point of no return, manipulating both husband and son to achieve her own desires.

== Cast and characters ==
- Shin Eun-kyung as Yoon Na-young
  - Kim Yoo-jung as young Na-young

She hides her evil intentions behind a smiling face, and has a chameleon sort of personality. Upon seeing how her mother lived her life by giving in, Na-young becomes more determined to live her life the way she wants. She is the type of person who strongly believes that you have to fight ruthlessly for your own happiness, and because of this she makes a decision that would haunt her later in life. She doesn't plan to have Soo-bin as her daughter-in-law in the path that she has paved for her son, Min-jae, to walk on.

- Seo Woo as Baek Soo-bin / Baek In-ki
  - Kim Yoo-jung as young Soo-bin

She is the hidden daughter of Yoon Na-young who becomes one of the most famous movie actresses in the nation, thus earning herself the nickname of Baek Inki (translated as "Popular Baek"). But as many fans as she has, she has as many anti-fans as well. She is a woman running towards success while running away from her past. She manages to marry Min-jae after they are caught in a scandalous position. The destruction of love and fame just seems like a game to her, and she believes that winning it all would mean happiness for her.

- Yoo Seung-ho as Kim Min-jae
  - Shin Dong-woo as young Min-jae

The 2nd generation son of a conglomerate family, he is someone with a pure soul. Whenever he feels lonely or is having a hard time, he has a habit of dancing off all his unhappiness and pain until he falls down. He is compassionate towards the woman that he loves despite her ugly past, and will even give her a warm hug when she needs it. As the owner of his own fate, he doesn't have to change the way he is, even if the secret of his birth is disclosed.

- Jo Min-ki as Kim Young-min
  - Joo Han-ha as young Young-min

The first generation son of a conglomerate family, he is the third son of Kim Tae-jin. His sole wish is to become a college professor, but it changes the moment he enters a family-arranged marriage with Yoon Na-young. Although he has the power to oppose his father and live the life he wants, he chooses not to leave. Unlike his ambitious wife Na-young, Young-min is a kindhearted man and father who believes that the family must stay united to be strong. Unlike his siblings, he has a deeper understanding and compassion for others, but he finds himself destroyed when the secret of his son's real birthright is revealed.

- Lee Soon-jae as Chairman Kim Tae-jin He is a self-made tycoon who built his business empire from scratch, and a strong charismatic father with three sons and a daughter. The K group Enterprise's company president finds himself facing another challenge in life as his children fight to become his empire's successor, with the most aggressive person being Yoon Na-young — the wife of his third son — who will stop at nothing to push her husband and son to the top of his succession list.

Kim family

- Lee Hyo-choon as Kang Geum-hwa
- Kim Byung-ki as Kim Young-dae
- Lee Bo-hee as Cha Soon-ja
- Jo Sung-ha as Kim Young-joon
- Sung Hyun-ah as Nam Ae-ri
- Son Eun-seo as Kim Mi-jin
- Kim Seung-hyun as Kim Young-shik
- Baek Jong-min as Kim Sung-jae

Yoon family

- Lee Ho-jae as Yoon Sang-hoon
- Kim Hee-jung as Yoon Jung-sook
- Cho Jin-woong as Kang Joon-goo

Extended cast

- Lee Se-chang as Park Duk-sung
- Uhm Soo-jung as Yang In-sook
- Park Chan-hwan as Song Jin-ho
- Kim Sung-hoon as a loan shark
- Jeon Se-hong as Jin-sook

== Awards and nominations ==
Year	Award	Category	Nominee	Result
2010	29th MBC Drama Awards	Top Excellence Award, Actress	Shin Eun-kyung	Won
2010	29th MBC Drama Awards	Best Young Actress	Kim Yoo-jung	Won
2011	47th Baeksang Arts Awards	Best Screenplay (Television)	Jung Ha-yeon	Nominated

== See also ==
- Flame of Desire - Australian musical
