= Seo Woo =

South Korean actress (born 1985)

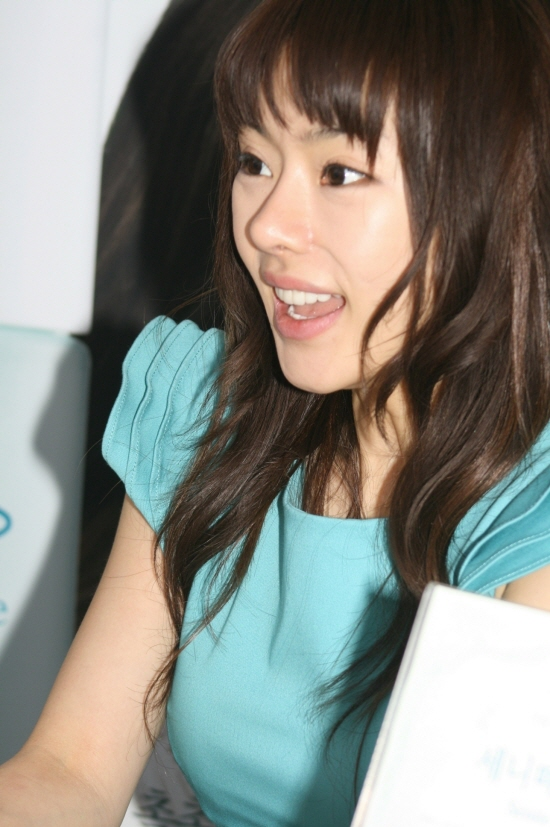
- Seo in 2010
- Born: Kim Moon-joo; July 7, 1985 (age 41); Seoul, South Korea
- Occupation: Actress
- Years active: 2007–present
- Agents: Cube Entertainment (2016–17) The CNT; (2018–present)

Korean name
- Hangul: 김문주
- RR: Gim Munju
- MR: Kim Munju

Stage name
- Hangul: 서우
- RR: Seo U
- MR: Sŏ U

Seo Woo (Korean: 서우; born July 7, 1985), birth name Kim Moon-joo, is a South Korean actress. She made her breakthrough with the film Crush and Blush (2008). She is best known for her roles in the films Paju and The Housemaid, as well as her roles in the TV dramas Tamra, the Island, Cinderella's Stepsister and Flames of Desire.

== Career ==
Seo first became known to the public as the "4D Girl" (wacky girl) in the popular "Ok me wa ka" commercial promoting the Lotte ice cream brand. After her debut as a supporting actress in the 2007 film My Son, she successfully auditioned and landed the part in the sitcom Kimchi Cheese Smile.

The following year, Seo received her breakout role in the black comedy Crush and Blush. She received considerable attention and the "Best New Actress" title in numerous awards for her success in the part—she was nominated for the same title in film at the 45th Baeksang Arts Awards. In 2009, Seo took on the lead role in the cult favorite Tamra, the Island, a period drama set on Jeju Island. She then contributed her vocals to "My Fair Lady," one of the tracks in Lee Seung-hwan's 20th anniversary album Hwantastic Friends.

Seo continued to challenge herself, delivering a much-praised turn in arthouse film Paju, and landing a role opposite celebrated actress Jeon Do-yeon in The Housemaid, which screened in competition at the 2010 Cannes Film Festival.

She and Moon Geun-young played siblings in the popular modern fairytale retelling Cinderella's Stepsister, but Seo later said she considers it her worst performance, despite being the character she worked hardest on. Afterwards she played a complex character in the melodrama Flames of Desire.

In the family drama If Tomorrow Comes, she played a cheerful daughter to veteran actress Go Doo-shim. She next portrayed a calm yet brave art major in the fantasy-horror TV movie Knock, about a magical mask passed down in a shaman family.

From 2013 to 2014, she played a Baekje-era femme fatale in the daily period drama The King's Daughter, Soo Baek-hyang.

In June 2016, Seo signed with Cube Entertainment. She left in 2017.

In December 2018, Seo signed with The CNT.

On December 12, 2019, Seo was featured in a horror film titled The House and took on the role of a pregnant woman named Eun Bi-roo.

== Filmography ==
=== Film ===
Year	Title	Role	Notes/Ref.
2007	My Son	Yeo-il	
2008	A School Rep.	Sun-ah	short film
2008	Crush and Blush	Seo Jong-hee	
2009	Handphone	Jung Yi-gyu's sister (cameo)	
2009	Paju	Choi Eun-mo	
2010	The Housemaid	Hae-ra	
2019	The House	Eun Bi-roo	

=== Television series ===
Year	Title	Role	Network
2007	Kimchi Cheese Smile	Seo Woo	MBC
2009	Tamra, the Island	Jang Beo-jin	MBC
2010	Cinderella's Stepsister	Goo Hyo-sun	KBS2
2010	Flames of Desire	Baek Soo-bin/Baek In-ki	MBC
2011	If Tomorrow Comes	Yoon Eun-chae	SBS
2012	Knock	Jung-hwa	MBN
2012	Glass Mask	Kang Yi-kyung/Seo Jung-ha	tvN
2013–14	The King's Daughter, Soo Baek-hyang	Seol-hee	MBC
2015	Late Night Restaurant	Doctor Hyo Jin (guest appearance, episode 12)	SBS

=== Music video appearances ===
Year	Song title	Artist
2009	"Wonderful Day (Good Day 2)"	Lee Seung-hwan
2010	"Right Now"	Psy
2012	"Irresistible Lips"	BtoB

== Awards and nominations ==
Year	Award	Category	Nominated work	Result
2008	29th Blue Dragon Film Awards	Best New Actress	Crush and Blush	Nominated
2008	28th Korean Association of Film Critics Awards	Best New Actress	Crush and Blush	Won
2008	7th Korean Film Awards	Best New Actress	Crush and Blush	Won
2008	11th Director's Cut Awards	Best New Actress	Crush and Blush	Won
2009	18th Buil Film Awards	Best New Actress	Crush and Blush	Won
2009	45th Baeksang Arts Awards	Best New Actress (Film)	Crush and Blush	Nominated
2009	MBC Drama Awards	Best New Actress	Tamra, the Island	Won
2009	MBC Drama Awards	Most Popular Actress	Tamra, the Island	Won
2010	5th Asia Model Awards	Fashionista Award	—N/a	Won
2010	4th Asia Pacific Screen Awards	Best Actress	Paju	Nominated
2010	46th Baeksang Arts Awards	Best Actress	Paju	Nominated
2010	46th Baeksang Arts Awards	Best New Actress (TV)	Tamra, the Island	Nominated
2010	47th Grand Bell Awards	Best Supporting Actress	The Housemaid	Nominated
2010	8th Korean Film Awards	Best Supporting Actress	The Housemaid	Nominated
2010	3rd Korea Drama Awards	Best New Actress	Cinderella's Sister	Won
2010	KBS Drama Awards	Best New Actress	Cinderella's Sister	Nominated
2013	MBC Drama Awards	Excellence Award, Actress in a Serial Drama	The King's Daughter, Soo Baek-hyang	Nominated
