= Jealousy Is My Middle Name =

- Theatrical release poster
- Hangul: 질투는 나의 힘
- Hanja: 嫉妬는 나의 힘
- RR: Jiltuneun naui him
- MR: Chilt'unŭn naŭi him
- Directed by: Park Chan-ok
- Written by: Park Chan-ok
- Produced by: Shin Chang-il; Peter Kim
- Starring: Park Hae-il; Bae Jong-ok; Moon Sung-keun; Seo Young-hee
- Cinematography: Park Yong-su
- Edited by: Kwon Ki-suk
- Music by: Jeong Hun-yeong
- Release date: April 18, 2003 (South Korea)
- Running time: 124 minutes
- Country: South Korea
- Language: Korean

Jealousy Is My Middle Name (Korean: 질투는 나의 힘; RR: Jiltuneun naui him; lit. 'Jealousy is My Strength') is a 2003 South Korean romantic drama film directed by Park Chan-ok in his directorial debut. It won Best Film honors at the Busan International Film Festival and the Rotterdam Film Festival. It was inspired by the poem of the same name by Ki Hyung-do.

In 2025, the film was selected by the South Korean film director Yoon Dan-bi for the section 'Our Little History, Please Take Care of Our Future!' at the 30th Busan International Film Festival, recognized as a work that had a profound influence on her creative journey.

== Plot ==
Quiet, intelligent, solemn and recently dumped by his girlfriend, graduate student Lee Weon-san (Park Hae-il) takes a job at a literary magazine, ostensibly to supplement his income, but really to get close to the editor - the reason he's now single. The editor (Moon Sung-keun), unaware of who Lee is, takes a shine to him and makes him his personal assistant. He likes having him around as he's the only person he feels comfortable with, which means he often takes advantage of Lee's passive nature, making him run errands for him all over town.

The fiercely independent Lee, however, works without complaint, having started a new relationship with part-time photographer/part-time vet Park Seong-yeon (Bae Jong-ok). When she takes a full-time job at the magazine, however, Lee pleads with her not to get involved with the editor, a plea that goes unheeded and sets Lee thinking once again about vengeance.

== Cast ==
- Park Hae-il as Lee Weon-san
- Bae Jong-ok as Park Seong-yeon
- Moon Sung-keun as Han Yun-sik
- Seo Young-hee as Ahn Hye-ok

== Awards and nominations ==
2002 Busan International Film Festival

- New Currents Award

2003 International Film Festival Rotterdam

- Tiger Award

2003 Busan Film Critics Awards

- Best New Actor – Park Hae-il

2003 Chunsa Film Art Awards

- Best New Actor – Park Hae-il

2003 Blue Dragon Film Awards

- Best Screenplay – Park Chan-ok

2003 Korean Film Awards

- Best New Actor – Park Hae-il

2003 Director's Cut Awards

- Best New Actor – Park Hae-il
