= List of Gokusen episodes =

Gokusen (ごくせん) is a three-season television drama, with Yukie Nakama in the title role, which was broadcast on Nippon TV from 2002 to 2008. It is based on the Japanese manga series of the same name, written and illustrated by Kozueko Morimoto. The story follows Kumiko Yamaguchi, the granddaughter of a yakuza boss and teacher at an all-male private high school.

== Episode list ==
=== Drama ===
==== Gokusen (2002) ====
No.	Title	Directed by	Written by	Original release date
1	"A zealous teacher goes on a rampage!" Transliteration: "Nekketsu sensei ōabare!!" (Japanese: 熱血先生大暴れ!!)	Tōya Satō	Michiru Egashira	April 17, 2002
A new teacher, Yamaguchi Kumiko, arrives at Shirokin School to become its mathematics teacher and the homeroom teacher of a Class 3D, which is composed of delinquents who try to scare her off. Kumiko is unruffled, but catches the attention of a group of friends led by Shin and composed of Kumai, Minami, Uchi and Noda. The school body, except for the Principal, is unaware that Kumiko is actually from the Oedo family, a yakuza family headed by her grandfather. Kumai is accused by the vice principal, Sawatari, of stealing a bag containing money from the school. Kumiko defends him and searches for the bag at a river after asking Kumai where it was. Kumiko searches for the bag overnight in vain, leading a remorseful Kumai to admit that he stole the bag out of hatred for the condescending Sawatari, but lost the bag after it was stolen from him by thugs. After chastising Kumai, Kumiko tracks down the thugs and beats them up single-handedly, to the surprise of Shin, who had followed her. As Kumai is about to be expelled from Shirokin, Kumiko arrives and shows the bag, while covering for Kumai by telling Sawatari that he had misplaced the bag. Kumiko pledges to take care of Class 3D and enable them to graduate, despite Shin and his friends' dismissive attitude.
2	"Don't abandon your friend!" Transliteration: "Tomodachi misutenna yo!!" (Japanese: 友達見捨てんなよ!!)	Tarō Ōtani	Michiru Egashira	April 24, 2002
The class gives Yamaguchi a nickname: Yankumi. She develops a crush with a fellow commuter named Shinohara, but is alarmed when he reveals himself to be a police detective. Minami dates a girl named Ayumi, unaware that she is already the girlfriend of Watanabe, a student from a rival school. Shin warns him, but Minami dismisses him, leading to a fistfight in which Sawatari demands a written apology on pain of expulsion. Yankumi learns from Kumai that Shin transferred to Shirokin after he beat up a teacher who abused a classmate in his previous school. Ayumi confesses to Minami and runs off, while Watanabe threatens him to a fistfight at a trainyard. Shin catches up to Minami's aid and is beaten up by Watanabe and his gang. When Class 3D tells Yankumi of what happened, scolds her class for abandoning those they claimed were their "friends" and rushes off to the trainyard, beating up Watanabe's group. Kumai, Uchi and Noda arrive too late and find Yankumi tending to Shin and Minami.
3	"Don't judge only by appearance!" Transliteration: "Mitame de kimenna!!" (Japanese: 見た目で決めんな!!)	Tōya Satō	Rie Yokota	May 1, 2002
A blond-haired thief wearing student attire has been going around stealing purses from women and Sawatari accuses Uchi, who closely resembles the suspect. Yankumi and Shin's group decide to capture the real criminal and clear Uchi's name by going on overnight stakeouts. Uchi's name is further sullied when he beats up Teradomari, an outstanding student from another section. Uchi dismisses the threats of his expulsion, saying he wants to find a job anyway. After meeting with Uchi's impoverished and widowed mother, Yankumi chastises Uchi for his shortcomings, leading to him reconciling with his mother. Yankumi and Shin's group later clear Uchi by catching the real thief, a middle-aged man in disguise, and blackmail Teradomari to withdrawing charges against Uchi when they find that Uchi assaulted him for hurting a puppy he was fostering.
4	"If you fail, start over" Transliteration: "Shippai shitara yarinaose" (Japanese: 失敗したらやり直せ)	Tarō Ōtani	Michiru Egashira	May 8, 2002
Noda has a crush on Shizuka, the English teacher, and regularly stalks her. One night, Noda sees Shizuka throwing away a necklace he gave as a gift on her way to a club where she works as a part-time hostess without the school's knowledge. In revenge, Noda leaks pictures of Shizuka at the club. Sawatari demands Shizuka's dismissal, but Yankumi offers to teach Class 3D to pass their English midterm test made by him with at least 30 points in exchange for saving Shizuka. At class, Yankumi beats up Noda for his actions and has to be restrained by Shin. Yankumi pushes her students to study hard, aided by the fact that most of the class has a crush on Shizuka. On exam day, the students insert notes of affection in their papers, moving Shizuka as she checks them. All the students pass except Kumai, who misses out by one point. As Shizuka prepares to leave despite resistance from Class 3D, the Principal rechecks Sawatari's questions and finds them faulty, enabling Kumai to pass.
5	"To fight is different from violence" Transliteration: "Kenka to bōryoku wa chigau" (Japanese: ケンカと暴力は違う)	Tōya Satō	Rie Yokota	May 15, 2002
Yankumi drops her phone, which is found by Shin. Shin goes to Yankumi's house to return it, but discovers her Yakuza background. Yankumi's grandfather asks her to keep quiet if he believes in Yankumi as a teacher. Meanwhile, a gang of high school students have been attacking people with metal poles, with suspicion falling on Class 3D again. Kumai falls in love with a girl named Ami, but is stymied when he finds out she already has a boyfriend. While hanging out, Kumai overhears a plot by students from Jinguji High School to attack Ami and his boyfriend, revealing them to be ones responsible for the violence. Kumai rushes to stop the attack, and is badly hurt in the process. Class 3D rushes to help. but Yankumi, knowing that a full-out brawl would lead to their entire expulsion, steps in between and bets up the Jinguji gang singlehandedly, while lecturing the students the difference between violence and fighting. As Class 3D celebrates, Shin reveals his knowledge of her Yakuza origins to Yankumi, while acknowledging that going to Shirokin would be boring without her.
6	"Don't let bullying get to you!" Transliteration: "Ijime ni makenna!!" (Japanese: イジメに負けんな!!)	Tarō Ōtani	Yūko Matsuda	May 22, 2002
Despite Yankumi's enthusiasm, Class 3D is reluctant to participate at the annual school sports festival, but changes their mind after Sawatari insults them and dares them to win one competition. Yankumi has difficulty trying to assemble the basketball team until she finds out that there is a missing student in the class, Yuki. When Yuki dismisses Yankumi's appeals for him to join, Minami and Kumai confess that Yuki stopped going to school because of their bullying. Yankumi tries one last time to convince Yuki by wrestling with him and telling him of her background as a victim of bullying, saying that her grandfather taught her to stand up for herself. At the sports contest, Class 3D ends up disqualifying themselves in every competition except basketball. At the last minute, Yuki arrives and helps 3D to win the match. Minami and Kumai apologize to Yuki for their actions. As Yuki had missed too many school days, he is unable to continue in 3D, but volunteers to reenroll at a lower year level, to Yankumi’s relief.
7	"Believe in your own child!" Transliteration: "Jibun no ko o shinjiro!!" (Japanese: 自分の子を信じろ!!)	Tōya Satō	Rie Yokota	May 29, 2002
Shin’s younger sister, Natsumi, appears at Shirokin, causing a stir among his friends and Yankumi. At the parent-teacher meeting, Yankumi encounters her dysfunctional students’ equally dysfunctional parents, except for Shin, whose parents don’t show up. After badgering Shin, Yankumi learns that he has been living alone after being cut off by his father, an overbearing government minister who is also pressuring Natsumi. Shin receives a call from Natsumi, who has run away from home and is in a casino. Shin rescues Natsumi from a group of abusive patrons and tells her to stay silent, but is arrested by police and expelled from Shirokin for entering the casino as a minor. Shinohara tells Yankumi that Shin cannot be released from custody as a minor unless Shin’s parents take him. After Shin tells Yankumi of what happened, Yankumi confronts Shin’s father for his selfishness, prompting Natsumi to confess the circumstances behind his brother’s arrest. Deeply moved, his father arranges for Shin’s release and his readmission to Shirokin. Yankumi accompanies Shin to 3D, but are surprised by the students who organize a celebration for Shin. Yankumi manages to make Shin smile for the first time.
8	"You're his mother!" Transliteration: "Anta wa hahaoya daro!!" (Japanese: あんたは母親だろ!!)	Tarō Ōtani	Michiru Egashira	June 5, 2002
Kawashima, the school nurse, has to go to a training camp just when her son, Yuta, comes over to see his mother. Because she can't cancel the training camp, Yankumi invites Yuta over for the night and in the morning, until Kawashima came back, Yankumi has Yuta over to her classroom. Little did they know that Yuta didn't inform his grandparents, whom Yuta lives with, that he's visiting Kawashima and that Yuta isn't actually related to Kawashima by blood. Refusing to give up, Yuta runs away and everyone hurries to find him. In the end, Yuta can live with Kawashima.
9	"Don't blame others for your own mistakes!" Transliteration: "Hito no sei ni sunna!!" (Japanese: 人のせいにすんな!!)	Tōya Satō	Rie Yokota	June 12, 2002
With the Shirokin volleyball team advancing towards nationals, Yankumi decided to form a cheerleading team. However, the event didn't go smoothly because of Kurosaki. Kurosaki holds a grudge against Shirokin because his volleyball coach made him quit. Kurosaki was involved in a violent incident and normally, Kurosaki would get off with a suspension, but the Coach made him quit to preserve the reputation of the team and the school. With such a strong grudge, Kurosaki is out for revenge.
10	"I'll believe my own students!" Transliteration: "Watashi wa seito o shinjiru!!" (Japanese: 私は生徒を信じる!!)	Naoharu Takahashi	Yūko Matsuda	June 19, 2002
When the Head Teacher's wife sets up an omiai for Yankumi, Yankumi reluctantly goes, knowing that she only has eyes for Shinohara the detective, whose sister is getting married. Later on, while Kuma is taking a stroll, he bumps into a student from a prestigious high school who was shoplifting. Kuma was blamed for the crime and Yankumi, Shin, Uchi, Minami, Noda and Kuma heads to bring the real perpetrator out.
11	"You are not alone" Transliteration: "Omae wa hitorijanai" (Japanese: お前は一人じゃない)	Tarō Ōtani	Michiru Egashira	June 26, 2002
After some students from class 3-D apprehended a serial murderer-robber, some reporters wanted a 24-hour close-up of how Yankumi's life is. However, things get out of hand when the reporters realize where Yankumi lives. Also, Kuma has a falling out with his father.
12	"Goodbye, Yankumi"; Transliteration: "Sayonara yankumi" (Japanese: さよならヤンクミ)	Tōya Satō	Michiru Egashira	July 3, 2002
Yankumi's secret is finally revealed. She was forced to resign, but the students of class 3-D couldn't stand for it. Many students voiced out to the superintendent how Yankumi was able to change all of them and has taught them many great lessons in life, threatening to drop out of school if they don't reinstate her. In the end, when Yankumi manages to convince all her student to stay in school, Sawatari, the vice-principal, comes to the conclusion that Yankumi is a needed teacher in the school.
SP	"Gokusen Special: Goodbye Class 3D ~ Yankumi's Tearful Graduation"; Transliteration: "Sayonara 3-nen D-gumi... yankumi namida no sotsugyōshiki" (Japanese: さよなら3年D組…ヤンクミ涙の卒業式)	Tōya Satō	Michiru Egashira; Yūko Matsuda; Rie Yokota	March 26, 2003
Yankumi's students finally enter their graduation. But before that happens, the students prepare for a trip, having to be very cautious that they don't get into trouble or the students may be expelled and Yakumi may be fired. Yankumi, Kawashima and Shizuka also go on a trip. Turns out that the students and Yankumi went to the same onsen.

==== Gokusen 2 (2005) ====
No.	Title	Directed by	Written by	Original release date
1	"Don't waste your once-in-a-lifetime experience in high school! ...That zealous teacher has returned!" Transliteration: "Tatta ichido no kōkō seikatsu, mudanisuruna! ...Ano nekketsu kyōshi ga kaettekita!!" (Japanese: たった一度の高校生活、無駄にするな! …あの熱血教師が帰ってきた!!)	Tōya Satō	Michiru Egashira	January 15, 2005
Yankumi returns again. However, she is now a teacher of class 3-D of Kurogin Academy, which is filled with delinquents. After learning that a student, Odagiri Ryuu, hasn't been coming to school, Yankumi investigates and tries to persuade Odagiri to come back.
2	"Power doesn't define a person's strength. There are more important things in people." Transliteration: "Hito no tsuyosa wa chikara ja kimaranai hito ni wa motto taisetsu na mono ga aru" (Japanese: 人の強さは力じゃ決まらない 人にはもっと大切なものがある)	Tarō Ōtani	Michiru Egashira	January 22, 2005
Odagiri Ryuu used to be friends with the now class leader, Yabuki Hayato. After Odagiri apologized to Ara High before class 3-D fights with them, Odagiri has been deemed a traitor. However, it was all a misunderstanding as the class soon finds out from Takeda, a student who Odagiri helped out.
3	"You guys are my most valued students! How can I desert you?" Transliteration: "Omaera wa watashi no daiji na seito da!! Misuteru mon ka" (Japanese: お前らは私の大事な生徒だ!! 見捨てるもんか)	Tōya Satō	Rie Yokota	January 29, 2005
After rejecting an invitation from Kudo, an expelled student from Kurogin, Odagiri and Yabuki find themselves framed for a robbery and arrested. Yankumi, after learning about the arrest, is determined to find the real perpetrators and straightening this mess out.
4	"Don't compare your life with someone else's!" Transliteration: "Jibun no jinsei, hito to kurabenna!" (Japanese: 自分の人生、人と比べんな!)	Tarō Ōtani	Michiru Egashira	February 5, 2005
Kurogin Academy has decided to become co-ed, but it starts when the seniors have already graduated. Tsuchiya, a student of Yankumi's, was in a bookstore when he catches a junior high female student attempting to shoplift. Tsuchiya can't leave the girl alone, so he introduces the other side of studying and brought her to an arcade, where she starts to have fun. However, a former homeroom teacher of Tsuchiya catches him and the teacher automatically blames and accuses Tsuchiya of forcing the girl to hang out with him. The situation starts to heat up as Yankumi realizes that Tsuchiya can potentially be expelled from Kurogin Academy.
5	"What's important is the strength of your heart!!" Transliteration: "Daiji na no wa, kokoro no tsuyosa da!!" (Japanese: 大事なのは、心の強さだ!!)	Tōya Satō	Yūko Matsuda	February 12, 2005
Takeda likes Maki, a student from Kurogin's neighboring female school. Trying to win her heart, Takeda resorts to dirty tactics, but soon learns that it wasn't a way to win her heart. After learning that Maki's boyfriend actually has several other girlfriends, Takeda duels her boyfriend for Maki, knowing that he will not be able to win this match.
6	"Think more about your parents' feelings!!" Transliteration: "Oya no kimochi o motto kangaero!!" (Japanese: 親の気持ちをもっと考えろ!!)	Tomoaki Watanabe	Rie Yokota	February 19, 2005
Hyuga got a job as a bartender's apprentice, but it seems that the bar also has a dangerous business on the side.
7	"Think seriously about your life" Transliteration: "Jibun no jinsei to shinken ni mukiae" (Japanese: 自分の人生と真剣に向き合え)	Tarō Ōtani	Michiru Egashira	February 26, 2005
Yankumi wanted every student to think about their future and begged for companies etc. to consider interviewing her students.
8	"I will always be your teacher" Transliteration: "Watashi wa zutto omaetachi no senkō da" (Japanese: 私はずっとお前たちのセンコーだ)	Tōya Satō	Yūko Matsuda	March 5, 2005
Kuma's restaurant is in danger when someone wants to build something on its land.
9	"Father and son's bond of tears..." Transliteration: "Chichi to musuko namida no kizuna..." (Japanese: 父と息子涙の絆…)	Tarō Ōtani	Rie Yokota	March 12, 2005
Odagiri's father found out that Odagiri has been going to school while he was away and Odagiri's father will have none of this rebellion.
10	"Be proud to graduate!! Yankumi and Class 3-D, tearful goodbye" Transliteration: "Mune hatte sotsugyō shiro! Yankumi to 3-nen D-gumi, namida no wakare" (Japanese: 胸張って卒業しろ!ヤンクミと3年D組、涙の別れ)	Tōya Satō	Michiru Egashira	March 19, 2005
It's four days till graduation. Can the students from class 3-D keep out of trouble? Especially since Kudo is on the loose again.

==== Gokusen 3 (2008) ====
No.	Title	Directed by	Written by	Original release date
1	"Yankumi has returned. The legendary school drama is finally back!" Transliteration: "Ano yankumi ga kaettekita densetsu no gakuen dorama tsuini fukkatsu!!" (Japanese: あのヤンクミが帰ってきた 伝説の学園ドラマついに復活!!)	Tōya Satō	Michiru Egashira	April 19, 2008
Three years after her resignation from Kurogin Academy, Yankumi returns as the new homeroom teacher of Akadou Academy's 3-D! Upon her arrival, she discovers that the class is full of delinquents, and is divided into two opposing groups that are always at each other's throats. One of the students, Kazama Ren, is suspected to be behind a series of muggings, and while the rest of the class doesn’t seem to care about his predicament, Yankumi resolves to prove Kazama's innocence.
2	"From now on, you guys are my friends!" Transliteration: "Omaera wa kyō kara nakama da!!" (Japanese: お前らは今日から仲間だ!!)	Tōya Satō	Michiru Egashira	April 26, 2008
Determined to teach class 3-D the true meaning of comradeship, Yankumi seeks out different ways to relate and get closer to the students, yet all her efforts seem to be thwarted. Meanwhile, the two heads of said groups, Ogata Yamato and Kazama Ren, decide to have a one-on-one fight to finally determine who's the better boss, but when this turns out futile, they find themselves settling their differences in the most unusual of means.
3	"Start over anytime!" Transliteration: "Itsu datte yarinaoseru!!" (Japanese: いつだってやり直せる!!)	Tarō Ōtani	Rie Yokota	May 3, 2008
The Spring Inter-Class Competition is nearing, and now that Ogata's and Kazama's sides have already made peace, Yankumi is more fired-up to have the whole class join and conquer the rugby match. Ichimura "Ichi" Rikiya, Yankumi's student, meets an old classmate from junior high, Takasugi, who seems to be a quiet, studious boy, but actually has a dangerous side to him.
4	"A sister and brother's bond of tears!" Transliteration: "Ane to otōto namida no kizuna!!" (Japanese: 姉と弟涙の絆!!)	Manami Yamashita	Yūko Matsuda	May 10, 2008
Yankumi, the teachers and class 3-D meet Kaoruko, Kazama's older sister. She visits Akadou Academy, and chastises Kazama upon finding out that he has a part-time job, which is prohibited in school. Amidst the "Springtime Eliminate Delinquency Campaign" organized by Sawatari, Kazama faces the possibility of expulsion for deliberately hitting a police officer, causing him to have a falling out with his sister.
5	"Don't think you can make it through life alone" Transliteration: "Hitori de ikite kita to omou na" (Japanese: 一人で生きてきたと思うな)	Tōya Satō	Michiru Egashira	May 17, 2008
Yankumi talks to her students’ parents about their future during PTC, one of them being Honjo Kengo's dad, a tofu store owner. When he collapses from over-fatigue, class 3-D fears that Honjo will have to drop out, so they decide to raise money to help him out by trying out different jobs. Honjo, on the other hand, encounters an old senpai of his, Narita, who lends him the money he needs – but with serious consequences.
6	"First love... Protect the people important to you" Transliteration: "Hatsukoi… taisetsu na hito o mamori nuke" (Japanese: 初恋…大切な人を守りぬけ)	Tōya Satō	Michiru Egashira	May 24, 2008
Class 3-D is planning a hook-up party with some girls from the neighboring schools, but Kuraki "Kura" Satoru is indifferent... for he is actually in love with Saki, a sickly girl he met a week prior. Wanting to take a break from the confines of the hospital, she calls Kuraki, and the two go out to have fun, until Saki's disease kicks in. This enrages her parents, and they file a complaint to Sawatari, prohibiting Kuraki from ever seeing Saki again. Unable to bear her student's misery, Yankumi steps in to help.
7	"Don't make excuses for yourself!" Transliteration: "Jibun ni iiwake sunna!!" (Japanese: 自分に言いわけすんな!!)	Tōya Satō	Michiru Egashira	May 31, 2008
It's time for Akadou Academy's annual festival, and Yankumi encourages class 3-D to participate. At first, everyone is uncaring, but the promise of girls visiting the school during the event ignites their enthusiasm, and they agree to form a coffee shop named "Hottie Café". Trouble arises, however, when Ogata, Kazama and the others unwittingly piss off Goda Ryuuji, an Akadou alumnus with a notorious reputation, who retaliates by vandalizing the school the night before the festival.
8	"Become stronger! The birth of a new life" Transliteration: "Tsuyokunare!! Atarashī inochi no tanjō" (Japanese: 強くなれ!! 新しい命の誕生)	Tōya Satō	Michiru Egashira	June 7, 2008
Ami, Kuma's wife, is approaching her due date. While an excited Yankumi prepares for the baby's birth, one of her students, Kamiya Shunsuke, finds himself frustrated when he gets beaten up by an Ara High bully in front of his girlfriend. Subsequent events with his mother and Kuma take a toll on his temper, and Yankumi races to rescue Kamiya when he picks another fight with a bunch of punks, as well as teach him an important lesson about strength.
9	"Our friends are a lifelong treasure!" Transliteration: "Nakama wa isshō mon no takara da!!" (Japanese: 仲間は一生もんの宝だ!!)	Tōya Satō	Michiru Egashira	June 14, 2008
Class 3-D is awarded for catching a thief during a secret night visit to school, yet their celebration is short-lived when they get into a scuffle with a few classmates who gets themselves involved with a bad crowd. With only a few months left before graduation, Yankumi strives to reunite everyone and restore 3-D's friendship.
10	"Obtain happiness by your own hands!!" Transliteration: "Shiawase wa jibun no te de tsukame!!" (Japanese: 幸せは自分の手でつかめ!!)	Tōya Satō	Michiru Egashira	June 21, 2008
Curious about why Yankumi is so strong despite her looks, Ogata and Kazama's group decides to follow her home, and gets the shock of their lives when they discover who she really is. The cheery atmosphere in their family greatly contrasts Ogata's – his father, a strict teacher from the elite Kaitoku School, is very disappointed with Ogata's status as an Akadou delinquent, and blames his irresponsibility for his parents' divorce.
11	"Yankumi's last tearful cry... Cherish your life!" Transliteration: "Yankumi saigo no namida no sakebi... inochi o taisetsu ni shiro!!" (Japanese: ヤンクミ最後の涙の叫び …命を大切にしろ!!)	Tōya Satō	Michiru Egashira	June 28, 2008
It's almost time for the finals, and class 3-D is determined not to fail in order to have a great summer break. Apart from that, they also have to avoid expulsion by not getting into any more trouble, but that appears unlikely when Goda is on the loose again. Swearing vengeance, he raids Akadou Academy and gravely injures Kazama, leading to immense chaos that seems impossible to stop, even for Yankumi herself.
SP	"Yankumi's final graduation ceremony!" Transliteration: "Yankumi saigo no sotsugyōshiki!" (Japanese: ヤンクミ最後の卒業式!)	Tōya Satō	Michiru Egashira; Rie Yokota	March 28, 2009
It’s graduation time, and there is a confrontation between the third-year students and the second-year students. Yankumi has to intervene to resolve the situation.

==== Gokusen: The Movie (2009) ====
No.	Title	Directed by	Written by	Original release date
-	"Gokusen: The Movie"; Transliteration: "Gokusen THE MOVIE" (Japanese: ごくせん THE MOVIE)	Tōya Satō	Michiru Egashira; Yūko Matsuda	July 11, 2009
Yankumi is now overseeing the new students of Class 3D of Akado High School, who still have not opened up to her and are giving her a hard time. Meanwhile, trouble is brewing for Ren, a former 3D student who is being sought by the police for being involved in a drug deal. Kumiko tries to find him with the help of other former 3D students.

=== The Gokusen (2004 anime) ===
No.	Title	Directed by	Written by	Original release date	English air date
1	"Rookie Teacher With A Secret Is Born!"; Transliteration: "Wake ari shinmai kyōshi tanjō!!" (Japanese: わけあり新米教師誕生！！)	Yūzō Satō	Yasuko Kobayashi	January 7, 2004	June 30, 2006
Kumiko Yamaguchi, the 23-year-old granddaughter of a yakuza boss, becomes a teacher at Shirokin High, an all-boys high school. On the first day, the class ignore her, but when she finds out that ex-students are beating up Teruo "Kuma" Kumai a student in her class, she secretly beats them up.
2	"Duel! Shin VS Ojou?"; Transliteration: "Taiketsu! Shin VS Ojō?" (Japanese: 対決！！慎VSお嬢？)	Akane Inoue	Yasuko Kobayashi	January 14, 2004	July 1, 2006
Kumiko asks the class to behave for her evaluation test but no one shows up on the day of the test. Shin Sawada offers that everyone will return to class if Kumiko will fight him and she agrees. When they meet after school for the fight, they are interrupted by the police and it is postponed.
3	"Kuma's First Time?"; Transliteration: "Kuma no shotaiken?" (Japanese: クマの初体験？)	Yukiyo Teramoto	Yasuko Kobayashi	January 21, 2004	July 2, 2006
Kumiko saves a woman from a drunken man in a hostess bar, but is surprised to find later that the woman is Kuma's mother. Kumiko grades math tests and after she learns the class' average is 21 she holds remedial classes, hoping some would come.
4	"Ojou Goes Blond! Whodunnit?"; Transliteration: "Ojō ga kinpatsu! Shinhan'nin wa dare?" (Japanese: お嬢が金髪！真犯人は誰？)	Shigetaka Ikeda	Yasuko Kobayashi	January 28, 2004	July 3, 2006
A local purse-snatcher is suspected of being a student of Shirokin High and Noda is arrested because he looks like the police sketch. Kumiko and a group from her class set out to catch the real thief and although Kumiko captures him, she gives the credit to her students.
5	"Ooedo Clan in Crisis!"; Transliteration: "Ōedo-gumi no kiki!" (Japanese: 大江戸組の危機！)	Hiroyuki Tanaka	Yasuko Kobayashi	February 4, 2004	July 4, 2006
Kumiko is made acting head of the Ooedo clan while her grandfather is hospitalized. Ex-student Kudoh takes the opportunity to stir up trouble with the militant Kakita clan and casting blame on the Ooedo clan. However, Kumiko, dressed as a gokutsuma (a yakuza woman) skilfully brokers a reconciliation between the clans without bloodshed. Some of Kumiko's childhood is revealed.
6	"Kyou's Knockout Performance?"; Transliteration: "Kyō-san no mei-shibai?" (Japanese: 京さんの迷芝居？)	Masahiko Yoda	Yasuko Kobayashi	February 11, 2004	July 5, 2006
Shin and Kuma see Kumiko get into a car with two men of the Ooedo clan. They follow her to her house but are caught and Kyo-san the clan put on an act so Shin and Kuma think Kumiko owes them money. Kuma falls for the act but Shin finds out the truth, however he promises to keep her secret.
7	"Shirokin Boys' Choir? Say What?!"; Transliteration: "Mingenhi~na~ tte nanja!?" (Japanese: ﾐﾝｹﾞﾝﾋ～ﾅ～って何じゃ!?)	Akane Inoue	Yasuko Kobayashi	February 18, 2004	July 6, 2006
Ms. Fujiyama tries to get Ichikawa, a good student who is being bullied, to join the choir club. Ms. Fujiyama's past as a middle school teacher is revealed, including the suicide of one of her former students who was also being bullied. Ichikawa almost commits suicide, but is saved by the efforts of Ms. Fujiyama, Kumiko and some of her students.
8	"The Class Trip Into Hell Begins!"; Transliteration: "Dotō no shūgakuryokō sutāto!!" (Japanese: ドトーの修学旅行スタート!!)	Yukiyo Teramoto	Kazuyuki Fudeyasu	February 25, 2004	July 7, 2006
The class goes on a field trip to Okinawa but things go wrong when the students skip out for the night and get into a brawl and Uchi does not return. Kumiko goes out to find him and accidentally rescues a different Uchi for one of the local gangs. After Kumiko displays her temper, the gang decide to help her find student Uchi. When they find him, she is overjoyed, but nevertheless gives him a hiding for causing her so much trouble.
9	"Schoolground Battle Without Honor Or Humanity?!"; Transliteration: "Jingi-naki gakuin tōsō boppatsu!?" (Japanese: 仁義無き学院闘争勃発！？)	Shigetaka Ikeda	Shōichi Satō	March 3, 2004	July 8, 2006
The school holds a cultural festival and Kumiko's class has a host club but they are more interested in fighting with the seniors. When a huge senior student on suspension, Ichiro Tsuruta, arrives things look grim for the juniors. However, Kumiko realizes that he would rather cook yakisoba than fight and she turns him into the perfect host for her class.
10	"School In The Crosshairs!"; Transliteration: "Nerawareta gakuin!" (Japanese: ねらわれた学院！)	Nanako Shimazaki	Kazuyuki Fudeyasu	March 10, 2004	July 9, 2006
Many students at school start to wear a cat badge but Kumiko discovers that they buying them for 10,000 yen to avoid being beaten up. Shin offers to help find the culprits, but when they find them, Kumiko is overpowered when Shin is taken hostage. Fortunately, some of the Ooedo group come to the rescue, however Shin is shamed by the episode and the next day he is absent from school.
11	"Shin Drops Out Of School?!"; Transliteration: "Maki-san ga gakkō o yameru!?" (Japanese: 慎さんが学校を辞める!?)	Yukiyo Teramoto	Shōichi Satō	March 17, 2004	July 10, 2006
Kumiko learns that Shin's father is going to withdraw him from Shirokin High and send him to a better school to fulfill his ambitions for his son. After some class members are arrested for trying to free Shin, Kumiko and Kyo-san rescue him, but Shin's father, the police commissioner, visits the Ooedo Clan and threatens to shut them down. Shin successfully pleads to stay at Shirokin High in spite of its poor reputation.
12	"Shirokin High Closing?!"; Transliteration: "Shirogane gakuin ga heikō!?" (Japanese: 白金学院が閉校･･･！？)	Hiroyuki Tanaka	Yasuko Kobayashi	March 24, 2004	July 11, 2006
The school's board of directors decides to close down Shirokin High but Kumiko objects. The directors agree that if the school can become number one in Japan academically or in sports within two weeks they will not close it down. Kumiko decides to have the school become number one in boxing, but takes to the ring herself and wins, saving the school.
13	"Yankumi's Final Act Of Honor!"; Transliteration: "Yankumi saigo no jingi!" (Japanese: ヤンクミ最後の仁義！)	Yūzō Satō	Yasuko Kobayashi	March 31, 2004	July 12, 2006
The vice principal discovers Kumiko's yakuza background but she resigns as a teacher before he can take action. As she leaves, she insults and beats up her students, but then she by kidnapped by Kudoh and the Nekomata group. Shin tries to rescue her alone, while Kuma goes to get help from the class. At first the class refuse, but after some convincing they decide to help and rescue her.
