= Cinderella's Stepsister =

2010 South Korean TV series

- Promotional poster
- Also known as: Sister of Cinderella
- Hangul: 신데렐라 언니
- RR: Sinderelra eonni
- MR: Sinderella ŏnni
- Genre: Melodrama; Romance
- Written by: Kim Gyu-wan
- Directed by: Kim Young-jo; Kim Won-seok
- Starring: Moon Geun-young; Chun Jung-myung; Seo Woo; Ok Taec-yeon
- Ending theme: "It Has To Be You" by Yesung
- Country of origin: South Korea
- Original language: Korean
- No. of episodes: 20

Production
- Executive producers: Bae Kyung-soo; Lee Sang-baek
- Producer: Moon Jun-ha
- Production location: Korea
- Running time: 60 minutes Wednesdays and Thursdays at 21:55 (KST)
- Production companies: AStory Co., Ltd.

Original release
- Network: Korean Broadcasting System
- Release: 31 March – 3 June 2010

Cinderella's Stepsister (Korean: 신데렐라 언니; lit. 'Cinderella's Sister') is a 2010 South Korean television series starring Moon Geun-young, Chun Jung-myung, Seo Woo, and Ok Taec-yeon. Applying a modern twist to the classic fairy tale, the story follows the contentious relationship between two stepsisters as their lives and loves intertwine. Written by Kim Gyu-wan, and directed by Kim Young-jo and Kim Won-seok, it aired on KBS2 from March 31 to June 3, 2010 on Wednesdays and Thursdays at 21:55 for 20 episodes.

== Synopsis ==
Ever since she was young, Eun-jo (Moon Geun-young) has learned to trust no one and live strong on her own. Used to being dragged from one broken home to another by her manipulative, money-grabbing mother (Lee Mi-sook), Eun-jo doesn't know what to make of her mother's latest catch Dae-sung (Kim Kap-soo), the solemn head of a traditional rice wine brewery. Both Dae-sung and his daughter, bubbly spoiled princess Hyo-sun (Seo Woo), warmly welcome wary young Eun-jo into their sprawling home, and treat her with a kindness that she simply can't stomach. Instead, she forms a bond with brewery staff Ki-hoon (Chun Jung-myung), the first person to see past her tough act, and it is his betrayal that will hurt the most. However, Dae-sung's genuine kindness to her eventually melts Eun-jo's defenses, and she learns to trust and love her stepfather. Naive Hyo-sun, meanwhile, stubbornly seeks affection at every turn, only to slowly realize she's losing Ki-hoon and everything else in her life to her cold stepsister. Eight years later, Jung-woo (Ok Taecyeon) reappears in Eun-jo's life, a boy she used to treat as her little brother who is now a young man determined to win her heart. Reluctant sisters Eun-jo and Hyo-sun both experience angst and rivalry, as their polar-opposite personalities and love-hate relationship bring them through many ups and downs from adolescence to adulthood.

== Cast ==
- Moon Geun-young as Song Eun-jo/Goo Eun-jo - A cynical and shy young woman, Eun-jo is good at hiding her emotions and does not get attached to people easily. She is skeptical of her stepfather's kindness; however, she later realizes that it is genuine and this realization begins to break her hard exterior. Eun-jo is in love with Ki-hoon, and is hurt when he leaves, leading her to be cold and reject him when he returns 8 years later. She later mourns her stepfather's death.
- Seo Woo as Goo Hyo-sun - A gentle and brilliant girl who has been treated like a princess her entire life. However, she is lonely and becomes excited when she learns that she'll be getting a new mother and sister. When her new family members are different from what she expected, it takes a toll on her. Hyo-sun is slightly spoiled and becomes jealous of her new stepsister.
- Chun Jung-myung as Hong Ki-hoon - Gentle, handsome, and kind, Ki-hoon sees much of himself in Eun-jo. However, when his difficult and broken family situation causes him to leave the winery, he disappears, leaving Eun-jo a letter that she never receives. Ki-hoon returns 8 years later and appears to be a spy for his evil step-family's company, but not everything is as it seems.
- Ok Taec-yeon as Han Jung-woo - Jung-woo is the adopted son of one of Song Kang-sook's ex-lovers. Eun-jo is the first person to care for him when he was a child, which creates a deep affection in him. Jung-woo finds Eun-jo at the winery 8 years later in order to be near her and declare his love for her. Jung-woo is selfless, reliable and always cares for Eun-jo.
  - Moon Suk-hwan as young Han Jung-woo
- Lee Mi-sook as Song Kang-sook - Eun-jo's mother. Knows how to get what she wants, and marries Go Dae-sung for his wealth. Though initially an evil stepmother who fakes affection for her new family, Kang-sook does love her daughter Eun-jo in her own way and begins to change as a result of Dae-sung's love for her.
- Kim Kap-soo as Goo Dae-sung - Hyo-sun's father and Eun-jo's stepfather. Dae-sung is kindhearted, genuine, and loving. His character and goodness causes changes in everyone around him for the better.
- Kang Sung-jin as Yang Hae-jin
- Choi Il-hwa as Chairman Hong
- Yeon Woo-jin as Dong-soo
- Go Se-won as Hong Ki-jung, Ki-hoon's manipulative and calculating older half-brother, who does not even acknowledge Ki-hoon as his brother.
- Seo Hyun-chul as Kang-sook's true love
- Kim Chung as Ki-hoon's stepmother

== Original soundtrack ==
1. 너 아니면 안돼 (It Has To Be You) - Yesung of Super Junior
2. 불러본다 (Calling Out) - Luna and Krystal of f(x)
3. 스마일 어게인 - Lee Yoon-jong
4. 너 였다고 - JM
5. 내 사랑을 구해줘! - Pink Toniq
6. 신데렐라언니
7. 미소지으면
8. 보사노바
9. 그때 그 자리에
10. 사랑한다면
11. 뒷동산
12. 마이너 왈츠
13. 느리게 걷기
14. 후회
15. 모정
16. 내 사랑을 구해줘! (Rock version) - Pink Toniq

== Ratings ==
Episode #	Original broadcast date	Average audience share			
Episode #	Original broadcast date	TNmS Ratings		AGB Nielsen	
Episode #	Original broadcast date	Nationwide	Seoul National Capital Area	Nationwide	Seoul National Capital Area
1	31 March 2010	16.7%	16.2%	15.8%	15.9%
2	1 April 2010	16.4%	15.8%	14.5%	15.5%
3	7 April 2010	16.8%	16.4%	16.1%	17.7%
4	8 April 2010	18.0%	17.3%	17.7%	18.2%
5	14 April 2010	19.7%	19.1%	19.1%	20.7%
6	15 April 2010	18.6%	17.8%	18.2%	19.1%
7	21 April 2010	18.5%	17.8%	17.9%	18.2%
8	22 April 2010	19.0%	18.6%	18.0%	18.2%
9	28 April 2010	19.2%	18.8%	18.7%	19.6%
10	29 April 2010	20.8%	20.6%	19.2%	20.4%
11	5 May 2010	18.8%	18.4%	18.3%	19.7%
12	6 May 2010	20.5%	20.3%	19.2%	20.7%
13	12 May 2010	18.1%	18.4%	17.3%	17.5%
14	13 May 2010	18.7%	18.4%	16.7%	17.4%
15	19 May 2010	19.0%	19.1%	17.1%	17.9%
16	20 May 2010	16.8%	17.1%	14.8%	15.1%
17	26 May 2010	23.2%	23.8%	20.2%	21.0%
18	27 May 2010	21.0%	22.1%	19.4%	20.1%
19	2 June 2010	22.3%	23.6%	20.0%	21.3%
20	3 June 2010	22.7%	23.7%	19.4%	20.6%
Average		19.2%	19.2%	17.9%	18.7%

== Awards and nominations ==
Year	Award	Category	Recipient	Result
2010	BGM Cyworld	Hall of Fame	"It Has To Be You"	Won
2010	5th Cyworld Digital Music Awards	Song of the Month (April)	"It Has To Be You"	Won
2010	25th Golden Disk Awards	Digital Bonsang	"It Has To Be You"	Nominated
2010	25th Golden Disk Awards	Popularity Award	"It Has To Be You"	Nominated
2010	2nd Melon Music Awards	Special Song OST Award	"It Has To Be You"	Nominated
2010	3rd Korea Drama Awards	Best Actress	Moon Geun-young	Nominated
2010	3rd Korea Drama Awards	Best New Actress	Seo Woo	Won
2010	KBS Drama Awards	Top Excellence Award, Actor	Kim Kap-soo	Won
2010	KBS Drama Awards	Top Excellence Award, Actress	Moon Geun-young	Won
2010	KBS Drama Awards	Top Excellence Award, Actress	Lee Mi-sook	Nominated
2010	KBS Drama Awards	Excellence Award, Actor in a Mid-length Drama	Chun Jung-myung	Nominated
2010	KBS Drama Awards	Excellence Award, Actress in a Mid-length Drama	Moon Geun-young	Nominated
2010	KBS Drama Awards	Best New Actor	Ok Taecyeon	Nominated
2010	KBS Drama Awards	Best New Actress	Seo Woo	Nominated
2010	KBS Drama Awards	Netizens' Award, Actor	Ok Taecyeon	Nominated
2010	KBS Drama Awards	Netizens' Award, Actress	Moon Geun-young	Nominated
2010	KBS Drama Awards	Netizens' Award, Actress	Seo Woo	Nominated
2010	KBS Drama Awards	Popularity Award, Actress	Moon Geun-young	Won
2010	KBS Drama Awards	Best Couple Award	Moon Geun-young and Chun Jung-myung	Nominated
2011	6th Cyworld Digital Music Awards	Best OST	"It Has To Be You"	Won
2011	47th Baeksang Arts Awards	Best New Actor (TV)	Ok Taecyeon	Nominated
2011	47th Baeksang Arts Awards	Best Screenplay (TV)	Kim Gyu-wan	Nominated
2011	47th Baeksang Arts Awards	Most Popular Actor (TV)	Ok Taecyeon	Nominated
2011	47th Baeksang Arts Awards	Most Popular Actress (TV)	Moon Geun-young	Won

== Adaptation ==
A Chinese remake of Cinderella's Stepsister, called Symphony of Fate, was produced in 2011.
