= Gong Hyo-jin filmography =

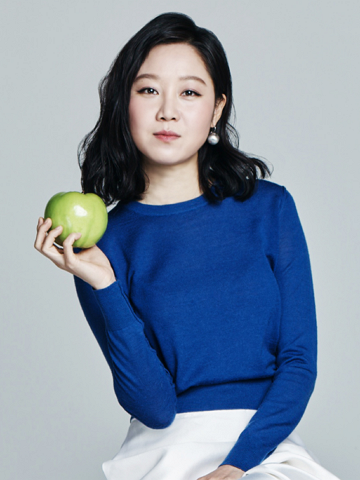
- Gong in 2016
- Film: 29
- Television series: 19
- Television show: 2
- Music videos: 3
- Theatre: 1

Gong Hyo-jin (born April 4, 1980) is a South Korean actress. She is best known for her leading role in the film Crush and Blush (2008), as well as for her popular television series Sang Doo! Let's Go to School (2003), Thank You (2007), Pasta (2010), The Greatest Love (2011), Master's Sun (2013), It's Okay, That's Love (2014), The Producers (2015), Don't Dare to Dream (2016), and When the Camellia Blooms (2019). She is considered to be the queen of romantic comedies due to her successful portrayals in her rom-com dramas.

== Films ==
Film performances
Year	Title		Role	Note	Ref.
Year	English	Korean	Role	Note	Ref.
1999	Memento Mori	여고괴담 두번째 이야기	Ji-won		
2000	Teabag Story	여름 이야기	Han Bom		
2001	Last Present	선물	Female MC	Bit part	
2001	Guns & Talks	킬러들의 수다	Yeo-il		
2001	Volcano High	화산고	So Yo-seon		
2002	Surprise Party	서프라이즈	In-ju		
2002	Emergency Act 19	긴급조치 19호	Kim Min-ji		
2002	A Bizarre Love Triangle	철없는 아내와 파란만장한 남편 그리고 태권소녀	Geum-sook		
2002	Conduct Zero	품행제로	Jang Na-young		
2005	Heaven's Soldiers	천군	Kim Su-yeon		
2006	Family Ties	가족의 탄생	Yoo Sun-kyung		
2007	My Son	아들	Daughter goose	Voice cameo	
2007	Happiness	행복	Soo-yeon		
2007	M	M	Eun-hye		
2008	Dachimawa Lee	다찌마와 리: 악인이여 지옥행 급행열차를 타라!	Geum Yeon-ja		
2008	Crush and Blush	미쓰 홍당무	Yang Mi-sook		
2009	Sisters on the Road	지금, 이대로가 좋아요	Oh Myung-ju	Digital remaster in 2022	
2010	Rolling Home With a Bull	소와 함께 여행하는 법	Hyun-soo		
2012	Love Fiction	러브픽션	Lee Hee-jin		
2012	You Are More Than Beautiful	미호2012: 그녀의 연기	Young-hee	Short film	
2012	577 Project	577 프로젝트	Herself	Documentary	
2013	Boomerang Family	고령화가족	Oh Mi-yeon		
2016	Missing	미씽: 사라진 아이	Han-mae		
2017	Proj. Get-up-and-go	프로젝트 패기		Cameo	
2017	Single Rider	싱글라이더	Soo-jin		
2018	Be with You	지금 만나러 갑니다		Cameo	
2018	Door Lock	도어락	Cho Kyung-min		
2019	Hit-and-Run Squad	뺑반	Eun Shi-yeon		
2019	Crazy Romance	가장 보통의 연애	Oh Sun-young		
2022	Ordinary Courage	보통의 용기	Herself	Documentary	
2025	The People Upstairs	윗집 사람들	Jeong-ah		
2025	The Journey to Gyeongju	경주기행	Jang-ju		

== Television series ==
Television series appearances
Year	Title		Role	Note	Ref.
Year	English	Korean	Role	Note	Ref.
2000	My Funky Family	가문의 영광	Hyo-jin		
2001	Wonderful Days	화려한 시절	Jo Yeon-shil		
2001	Teabag Without Hope	사랑하라, 희망없이		Drama City	
2002	Ruler of Your Own World	네 멋대로 해라	Song Mi-rae		
2003	Snowman	눈사람	Seo Yeon-wook		
2003	Sang Doo! Let's Go to School	상두야 학교 가자	Chae Eun-hwan		
2004	5 Stars	다섯 개의 별			
2005	Hello My Teacher	건빵선생과 별사탕	Na Bo-ri		
2007	Thank You	고맙습니다	Lee Young-shin		
2010	Pasta	파스타	Seo Yoo-kyung		
2011	The Greatest Love	최고의 사랑	Gu Ae-jung		
2011	Do You Know Sad Movies?	타임: 새드 무비를 아시나요?	Narrator	Documentary (Time, ep. 1)	
2011	Cool Guys, Hot Ramen	꽃미남 라면가게	Record store clerk	Cameo (ep. 9)	
2013	Master's Sun	주군의 태양	Tae Gong-shil		
2014	It's Okay, That's Love	괜찮아, 사랑이야	Ji Hae-soo		
2015	The Producers	프로듀사	Tak Ye-jin		
2016	Don't Dare to Dream	질투의 화신	Pyo Na-ri		
2019	When the Camellia Blooms	동백꽃 필 무렵	Dong Baek		
2025	When the Stars Gossip	별들에게 물어봐	Eve Kim		
2026	A Bona Fide Killer	유부녀 킬러	Yoo Bo-na		
TBA	Queen of the Scene	위기의 여자	Kim Ma-ri	Netflix series	

== Variety show ==
Variety show appearances
Year	Title		Role	Note	Ref.
Year	English	Korean	Role	Note	Ref.
2012	Running Man	런닝맨	Guest	Eps. 108	
2020	Three Meals a Day	삼시세끼	Guest	Fishing Village 5 Eps. 2-4	
2020	House on Wheels	바퀴 달린 집	Guest	Eps. 3-5	
2021	Public Land	공공랜드	Cast Member with Jeon Hye-jin and Lee Chun-hee		

== Music video appearances ==
Music video appearances
Year	Title		Artist	Ref.
Year	English	Korean	Artist	Ref.
2003	(Part 1) "Left Alone"	덩그러니	Lee Soo-young	
2003	(Part 2) "I Still Bite My Lips"	여전히 입술을 깨물고	Lee Soo-young	
2003	"Brown Hair"	갈색머리	Yun Geon	
2024	"Champagne"	샴페인	Jo Jung Suk	

== Theater ==
Theater appearances
Year	Title		Role	Note	Ref.
Year	English	Korean	Role	Note	Ref.
2014–2015	Educating Rita	리타	Susan		
