= Gong Hyo-jin =

South Korean actress (born 1980)

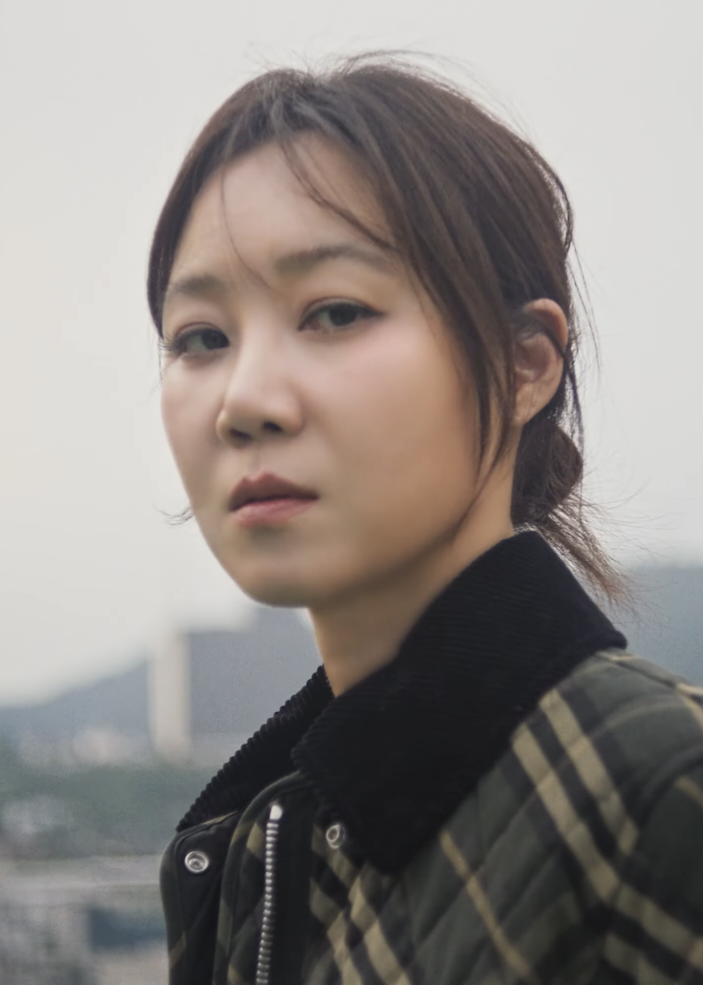
- Gong in October 2024
- Born: April 4, 1980 (age 46); Seoul, South Korea
- Education: Sejong University , Department of Film Arts
- Occupation: Actress
- Years active: 1999–present
- Agent: Management SOOP
- Works: Full list
- Spouse: Kevin Oh (m. 2022)

Korean name
- Hangul: 공효진
- Hanja: 孔曉振
- RR: Gong Hyojin
- MR: Kong Hyojin

Gong Hyo-jin (Korean: 공효진; born April 4, 1980) is a South Korean actress. She is best known for her leading role in the film Crush and Blush (2008), as well as for her popular television series Sang Doo! Let's Go to School (2003), Thank You (2007), Pasta (2010), The Greatest Love (2011), Master's Sun (2013), It's Okay, That's Love (2014), The Producers (2015), Don't Dare to Dream (2016), and When the Camellia Blooms (2019).

She is considered to be the queen of romantic comedies due to her successful portrayals in her rom-com dramas. In 2019, she was Gallup Korea's Television Actor of the Year.

== Early life ==
Gong Hyo-jin was born in 1980 in Sinwol-dong, Gangseo District, Seoul, South Korea. When she was a junior in high school, she moved to Australia with her mother and younger brother, while her father remained in Korea to support the family. Gong attended high school at John Paul College in Brisbane. Gong has spoken fondly of her memories of her time there, and in 2011 she was designated as one of the goodwill ambassadors for "Year of Friendship," the 50th anniversary of bilateral relations between Australia and South Korea.

After three years in Australia, the Gong family moved back to Korea in 1997 due to the Asian financial crisis.

== Career ==
=== 1999–2005: Early work ===
Upon her return to Korea, Gong began working as a model. She appeared in advertisements, notably the "Happy to Live" commercial for Telecom 700–5425. After a year and a half of modeling, she made her acting debut in a supporting role in Memento Mori. Co-directed by Kim Tae-yong and Min Kyu-dong, the comedy film reinvented its genre with its fresh approach tn teenage femme sexuality and its destructive force, melding sapphism and the supernatural at a girls' high school. Although it was not a box office hit in 1999, the film is frequently cited by young Korean filmmakers and cinema fans as a modern-day classic. At first Gong wasn't serious about acting and couldn't wait for filming to be over, but Memento Mori's critical success encouraged her to continue acting, and she followed that with a role in the 2000 sitcom My Funky Family.

In 2001, she was cast in the 25-episode television series Wonderful Months, where she played a bus conductor with a one-sided crush on Ryoo Seung-bum's character (Gong and Ryoo later won Best New Actress and Best New Actor in the TV category at the Baeksang Arts Awards). After appearing in small roles in Jang Jin's comedy Guns & Talks and teen martial arts flick Volcano High, the young actress had her breakthrough year in 2002, landing lead roles in Emergency Act 19 and A Bizarre Love Triangle.

Gong's performance in Ruler of Your Own World grabbed the industry's attention. The TV series was praised for its realistic writing and strong acting, earning it "mania drama" (or cult hit) status in Korea. That same year, she again acted opposite Ryoo in Conduct Zero, earning praise for her role as the tough-talking "boss" of the girls' high school. The 1980s-set retro comedy was well received by both audiences and critics.

The 2003 series Snowman paired Gong with Cho Jae-hyun and Kim Rae-won, in a controversial plot about a girl who falls in love with her older brother-in-law. She then returned to more mainstream fare in Sang Doo! Let's Go to School, helmed by TV director Lee Hyung-min, with whom she had previously worked with in a Drama City episode. Gong played a high school teacher who meets her childhood sweetheart again, now a gigolo and single dad with a sick daughter. Known for being the acting debut of pop singer Rain, the drama did well in the ratings, and Gong won several awards at the KBS Drama Awards.

In 2004 to 2005, Gong entered a career slump. She was dissatisfied with the scripts she was getting, and felt she was being typecast in ingenue roles. Cast as another high school teacher in Hello My Teacher, and a scientist in Heaven's Soldiers, Gong longed to portray meatier, "real women" roles, but she was unwilling to do nudity in film.

=== 2006–2008: Critical success ===
In 2006, Memento Mori director Kim Tae-yong (whom Gong considers her mentor) offered her a part in Family Ties, a role he had written specifically for her. The film drew widespread acclaim as a delicately observed, cross generational look at unconventional families. The cast was praised for their brilliant acting, with reviews singling out Gong's portrayal of an angry young woman in a deeply troubled relationship with her mother. She received a Best Actress nomination from the Korean Film Awards, and also shared Best Actress honors with co-stars Moon So-ri, Go Doo-shim and Kim Hye-ok at the Thessaloniki International Film Festival in Greece. Family Ties marked a turning point in her career, and gave Gong a renewed passion for acting.

In 2007 she returned to television in Thank You, written by Sang-doo scribe Lee Kyung-hee. Several actresses had turned down the unglamorous role of a single mother with an HIV-positive daughter and a grandfather with dementia; another reason being that this was lead actor Jang Hyuk's comeback after his draft-dodging scandal. Despite little hype, Thank You became a modest hit and rose to number one in its timeslot. Viewer response to the drama had been mostly heartwarming and life-affirming, which Gong said she treasures. The maternal role served to soften and feminize her image, but Gong was also praised for her nuanced portrayal that grounded her character in reality, helping to prevent the drama from being overly maudlin or saccharine.

After Thank You, Gong went back to film and took on supporting roles for the opportunity to work with some of the most talented directors in Chungmuro. She played a coolly unsentimental ex-girlfriend in Hur Jin-ho's melodrama Happiness, a concerned fiancée in Lee Myung-se's stylistic psychodrama M, and a spy in Ryoo Seung-wan's action comedy/parody Dachimawa Lee.

Strong performances in varied roles helped cement Gong's reputation as a serious actress, but Crush and Blush in 2008 would become her most high-profile movie yet. Hailed by critics as one of the most original Korean films in recent years, Lee Kyoung-mi's feature directorial debut was divisive, and though its box office performance was a disappointment, it acquired a sort of cult status among Korean cinephiles. The black comedy was a showcase for Gong, who transformed herself into a misanthropic antiheroine with an unattractively blushing red face, frizzy hair, dowdy clothes, and a chronic case of inferiority complex and hopeless delusion. Gong had wavered at first when presented with the script, given the character's excesses. Reportedly urged on by fellow actress Jeon Do-yeon, she eventually accepted and threw herself into the role. Park Chan-wook, who produced the film, praised Gong's subtle emotional variations, and told her that she might never be able to top this performance, joking that she should retire. She won numerous acting awards in Korea, among them Best Actress trophies from the Korean Film Awards, Director's Cut Awards, and Women in Film Korea Awards. She also received nominations from the Blue Dragon Film Awards and Baeksang Arts Awards, as well as a Rising Star Award from the New York Asian Film Festival.

=== 2009–2014: Mainstream popularity ===
After starring with close friend Shin Min-a in the 2009 indie Sisters on the Road, Gong played an aspiring chef in the romantic comedy series Pasta in 2010. Originally written as the usual brash and spunky rom-com heroine, Gong thought it would be boring and clichéd to play her as such, and instead made the significant acting decision to play against type by creating the character as an ordinary girl who was seemingly meek, but had a quiet strength and slyly got her way. Her chemistry with co-star Lee Sun-kyun and the drama's breezy atmosphere propelled it to the top of the ratings chart.

Defying easy categorization into the actress dichotomies of innocent (Choi Ji-woo, Song Hye-kyo) or sexy (Kim Hye-soo, Uhm Jung-hwa), Gong belonged to a third, very minor group of eccentrics that also includes Kang Hye-jung and Bae Doona. Though not a typical beauty, after the success of Pasta, Gong was given the label Gongvely by the press, a portmanteau of her surname and the English word "lovely."

In an emerging pattern of alternating mainstream TV series with riskier big-screen projects, Gong starred in Rolling Home with a Bull, another low-budget indie adapted from Kim Do-yeon's novel. She played a widow traveling with her poet ex-boyfriend in Yim Soon-rye's part-Buddhist meditation, part-road movie.

In 2011, Gong acted opposite Cha Seung-won in the TV series The Greatest Love. Written by the Hong sisters, the romantic comedy is set in the entertainment industry and is about an unlikely romance between a has-been pop-star and a top actor. The series was a big hit with audiences, resulting in increased popularity for Cha and Gong. She was also praised for her naturalistic, no-nonsense acting, which served to balance Cha's wacky antics. The Greatest Love swept the MBC Drama Awards, including a Top Excellence Award for Gong (her third consecutive, after Thank You and Pasta). Gong later won Best Actress for TV at the Baeksang Arts Awards.

She worked again with Kim Tae-yong for Beautiful 2012, a series of four Micro Movies produced by Chinese internet platform Youku. that explore the concept of "what is beautiful?". In Kim's short film You Are More Than Beautiful, Park Hee-soon plays a man who hires an actress named Young-hee (Gong) to pretend to be his fiancée when he introduces her to his dying father in Jeju Island. You Are More Than Beautiful later received a theatrical release in 2013.

Uninterested in stereotypical pretty roles, Gong said she preferred playing multi-faceted women, like the laidback, unpredictable female lead with unshaven armpit hair in Love Fiction. Known for her candor on set and in public, Gong openly admitted that she had problems with her character and took her complaints to its director Jeon Kye-soo. Though Gong said she would rather continue making small-scale films rather than do a shallow blockbuster, Love Fiction was her most commercial feature yet, and broke even at more than 1.7 million admissions. She then reunited with Love Fiction co-star Ha Jung-woo in 577 Project, a documentary that follows a group of actors walking 577 kilometers (358 miles) across the nation.

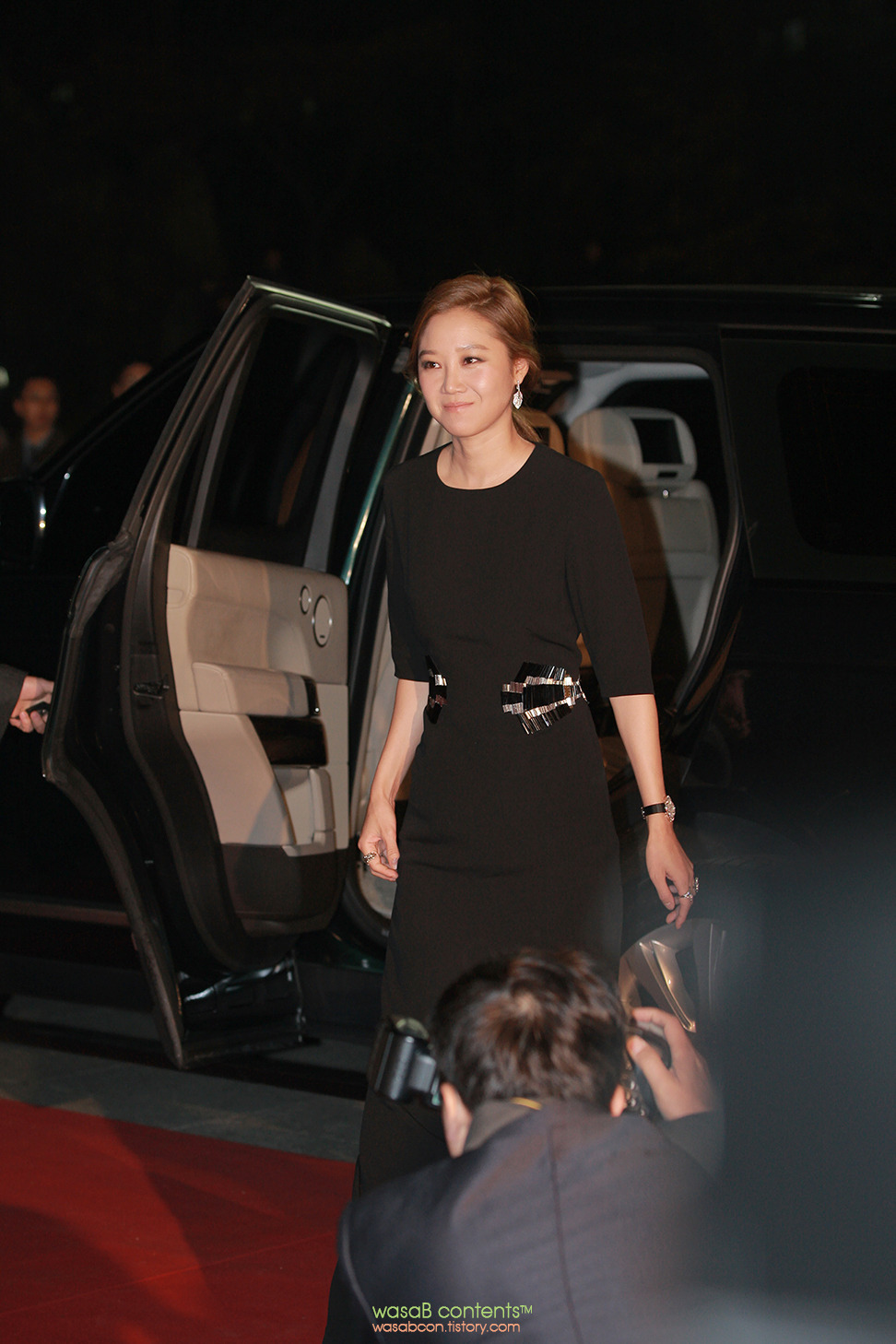
Gong at the 34th Blue Dragon Film Awards in 2013

In 2013 Gong starred in the comedy film, Boomerang Family, adapted from Cheon Myung-kwan's novel Aging Family about a grown-up trio of siblings who embark on a series of misadventures after they move back into their mother's home. Gong said she felt catharsis from her character's constant cursing, and pleasure from acting in an ensemble whose actors share great chemistry with each other. Veteran actress Youn Yuh-jung said that the role of a twice-divorced single mother was perfect for her that she couldn't imagine anyone else playing it.

The Hong sisters cast her again in their next series Master's Sun, a romantic comedy with horror elements. Costar So Ji-sub praised Gong as "the best Korean actress currently working in romantic comedy." The drama series was a commercial hit, and it renewed So and Gong's domestic and international popularity.

In 2014, Gong starred as a psychiatrist who falls for a mystery novelist with schizophrenia (played by Zo In-sung) in the medical-melodrama series It's Okay, That's Love. She said she chose the project because of screenwriter Noh Hee-kyung, who had also written a drama Gong appeared in a decade ago, Wonderful Days. Despite lackluster ratings, It's Okay, That's Love ranked third on the year-end Content Power Index and received praise for addressing the discrimination and social stigma attached to people with mental health issues and other minorities.

=== 2015–present: Stage debut and continued success ===
Gong then made her stage debut in the Willy Russell play Educating Rita, which depicts the relationship during the course of a year between a young working class hairdresser and a middle-aged university lecturer (played by Jeon Moo-song).

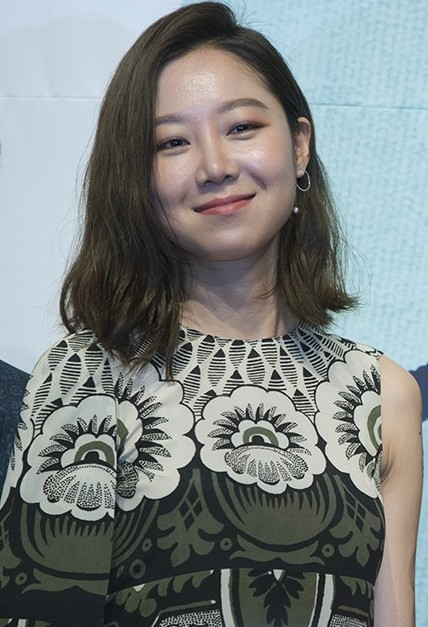
Gong at The Producers press conference in 2015

In 2015, she starred in The Producers, a variety drama series written by Park Ji-eun who also wrote the hugely successful My Love from the Star. Gong plays a Music Bank variety show producer who has been working in broadcasting for 10 years. The drama drew solid viewership ratings domestically, and also gained popularity internationally.

In 2016, Gong starred in the SBS romantic comedy drama Don't Dare to Dream opposite Jo Jung-suk, playing a weather broadcaster. She then starred in the mystery film Missing, in the role of a babysitter who one day disappears with someone else's child. Missing proved Gong's versatility on the big screen.

In 2017, Gong starred in the thriller Single Rider with Lee Byung-hun. She played a former violinist who lives in Australia with her son.

In 2018, Gong starred in Door Lock, a mystery thriller about the horrors faced by women.

In 2019, Gong starred in a police action film Hit-and-Run Squad alongside Ryu Jun-yeol and Jo Jung-suk, a car chase thriller that focuses on hit and runs; followed by a romantic comedy film Crazy Romance alongside Snowman co-star Kim Rae-won. The same year, she made her small-screen comeback in the romantic comedy thriller When the Camellia Blooms alongside Kang Ha-neul. Both Crazy Romance and When the Camellia Blooms are commercial successes, and have solidified her position as a romantic comedy queen. Gong won the Grand Prize award at the KBS Drama Awards.

== Other activities ==
In 2010, Gong published a collection of essays on the environment titled Gong Hyo-jin's Notebook (공책; Gongchaek, which is a play on her surname and the Korean word for "notebook"). In it, Gong gives a look inside her personal lifestyle habits and offers practical and simple tips. The book has sold over 40,000 copies and is on its fourth printing.

She recorded the duet "I Think I Love You" for K-pop singer MY Q's 2011 album Ready for the World.

Gong, along with fellow actresses Kim Min-hee and Choi Kang-hee, is considered an influential fashion icon by Korean women in their 20s and 30s. In 2010 she collaborated with shoe brand pushBUTTON to produce the capsule collection "Excuse Me + pushBUTTON." Two years later, Suecomma Bonnie, another shoe brand, released her "Excuse Me x Suecomma Bonnie" line. In 2012 she designed a selected line of apparel for the fashion shop Los Angeles Project, a brand located inside Shinsegae Department Stores. Her neon-colored and patterned items were sold under the name "LAP by Kong Hyo-jin."

She was named jury president for the 2009 International Women's Film Festival in Seoul. Gong was also a jury member for the 2011 Asiana International Short Film Festival, the 2006 Mise-en-scène Short Film Festival and the 2006 Jecheon International Music & Film Festival.

== Personal life ==
In April 2022, Gong and Kevin Oh admitted that they were dating. On August 17, 2022, Kevin announced in letters posted on his social media accounts that they would be getting married in October in the United States, in a private wedding with only close relatives from both families. They married in a private ceremony on October 11, 2022 (US time) in New York City.

== Discography ==
=== Singles ===
| Title | Year | Album |
|---|---|---|
| "Bed's End" (침대의 끝) (with Jo Eun-ji) | 2002 | A Bizarre Love Triangle OST |
| "I Think I Love You" (나 너를 사랑하나봐) (My Q feat. Gong Hyo-jin) | 2011 | Ready for the World |
| "Spoiler" (스포일러) (Epik High (uncredited vocals by Gong Hyo-jin) | 2014 | Track from Shoebox |
| "Ordinary Brave" (보통의 용기) (with Jeon Hye-jin and Lee Chun-hee) | 2022 | Ordinary Courage OST |

== Theater ==
Theater appearances
| Year | Title | | Role | Note | Ref. |
| Year | English | Korean | Role | Note | Ref. |
|---|---|---|---|---|---|
| 2014–2015 | Educating Rita | 리타 | Susan | | |

== Bibliography ==
| Year | English title | Korean title | Notes | ISBN |
|---|---|---|---|---|
| 2010 | Gong Hyo-jin's Notebook | 공효진의 공책 | Environmental essays | ISBN 978-89-5605-506-0 |

== Fashion lines ==
| Year | Fashion line | Notes |
|---|---|---|
| F/W 2010 | Excuse Me + pushBUTTON capsule collection | Collaboration with Park Seung-gun |
| 2012 | Excuse Me x Suecomma Bonnie | Collaboration with Bohyun Lee |
| S/S 2012 | LAP by Kong Hyo-jin | Collaboration with Los Angeles Project |
| 2016 | Kong Hyo-jin x Vincis: Hyobag | Collaboration with Vincis |
| 2016 | Kong x gentlemonster | Collaboration with Gentlemonster |
| 2016 | Edit de Hyo | Collaboration with Jestina Red |

== Accolades ==
=== Awards and nominations ===
Name of the award ceremony, year presented, category, nominee of the award, and the result of the nomination
| Award ceremony | Year | Category | Nominee / Work | Result | Ref. |
|---|---|---|---|---|---|
| APAN Star Awards | 2013 | Top Excellence Award, Actress | Master's Sun | Nominated | |
| APAN Star Awards | 2014 | Top Excellence Award, Actress in a Miniseries | It's Okay, That's Love | Nominated | |
| APAN Star Awards | 2015 | Top Excellence Award, Actress in a Miniseries | The Producers | Nominated | |
| APAN Star Awards | 2021 | Grand Prize (Daesang) (Note: A Daesang (Korean: 대상), which translates to "Grand Prize", is the highest honor given out at South Korean award ceremonies.) | When the Camellia Blooms | Nominated | |
| Asian Film Awards | 2008 | Best Supporting Actress | Happiness | Nominated | |
| Baeksang Arts Awards | 2002 | Best New Actress – Television | Wonderful Days | Won | |
| Baeksang Arts Awards | 2009 | Best Actress – Film | Crush and Blush | Nominated | |
| Baeksang Arts Awards | 2012 | Best Actress – Television | The Greatest Love | Won | |
| Baeksang Arts Awards | 2020 | Best Actress – Television | When the Camellia Blooms | Nominated | |
| Blue Dragon Film Awards | 2001 | Best Supporting Actress | Guns & Talks | Nominated | |
| Blue Dragon Film Awards | 2002 | Best Supporting Actress | Volcano High | Nominated | |
| Blue Dragon Film Awards | 2003 | Best Supporting Actress | Conduct Zero | Nominated | |
| Blue Dragon Film Awards | 2008 | Best Actress | Crush and Blush | Nominated | |
| Blue Dragon Film Awards | 2012 | Best Actress | Love Fiction | Nominated | |
| Blue Dragon Film Awards | 2012 | Popular Star Award | Love Fiction | Won | |
| Blue Dragon Film Awards | 2013 | Popular Star Award | Boomerang Family | Won | |
| Blue Dragon Film Awards | 2017 | Best Actress | Missing | Nominated | |
| Buil Film Awards | 2008 | Best Supporting Actress | M | Nominated | |
| Buil Film Awards | 2017 | Best Actress | Missing | Nominated | |
| CETV Awards | 2010 | Top 10 Asian Stars | Pasta | Won | |
| Chunsa Film Art Awards | 2008 | Best Supporting Actress | Happiness | Nominated | |
| Chunsa Film Art Awards | 2017 | Best Actress | Missing | Nominated | |
| Cosmo Beauty Awards | 2015 | Asia Beauty Icon | Gong Hyo-jin | Won | |
| Director's Cut Awards | 2008 | Best Actress | Crush and Blush | Won | |
| Elle Style Awards | 2017 | Super Icon (Female) | Gong Hyo-jin | Won | |
| Fashionista Awards | 2017 | Best Dresser of the Year | Gong Hyo-jin | Won | |
| Golden Cinema Film Festival | 2017 | Best Actress | Missing | Won | |
| Grand Bell Awards | 2008 | Best Supporting Actress | Happiness | Nominated | |
| Grand Bell Awards | 2015 | Popularity Award | Gong Hyo-jin | Won | |
| Grand Bell Awards | 2017 | Best Actress | Missing | Nominated | |
| InStyle Star Icon | 2016 | Best Actress | The Producers | Won | |
| InStyle Star Icon | 2016 | Most Stylish Female Actress | Gong Hyo-jin | Won | |
| KBS Drama Awards | 2003 | Excellence Award, Actress | Sang-doo! Let's Go to School | Won | |
| KBS Drama Awards | 2003 | Netizen Award, Actress | Sang-doo! Let's Go to School | Won | |
| KBS Drama Awards | 2003 | Best Couple Award | Gong Hyo-jin with Rain; Sang-doo! Let's Go to School | Won | |
| KBS Drama Awards | 2015 | Top Excellence Award, Actress | The Producers | Nominated | |
| KBS Drama Awards | 2015 | Excellence Award, Actress in a Miniseries | The Producers | Nominated | |
| KBS Drama Awards | 2015 | Best Couple Award | Gong Hyo-jin with Kim Soo-hyun and Cha Tae-hyun; The Producers | Won | |
| KBS Drama Awards | 2019 | Grand Prize (Daesang) | When the Camellia Blooms | Won | |
| KBS Drama Awards | 2019 | Top Excellence Award, Actress | When the Camellia Blooms | Nominated | |
| KBS Drama Awards | 2019 | Excellence Award, Actress in a Mid-length Drama | When the Camellia Blooms | Nominated | |
| KBS Drama Awards | 2019 | Best Couple Award | with Kang Ha-neul; When the Camellia Blooms | Won | |
| KBS Entertainment Awards | 2021 | Rookie Award in Reality Category | Today's Harmless | Nominated | |
| Korea Culture and Entertainment Awards | 2014 | Top Excellence Award, Actress in a Drama | It's Okay, That's Love | Won | |
| Korea Drama Awards | 2011 | Best Actress | The Greatest Love | Nominated | |
| Korea Drama Awards | 2013 | Top Excellence Award, Actress | Master's Sun | Nominated | |
| Korea Drama Awards | 2017 | Top Excellence Award, Actress | Don't Dare to Dream | Nominated | |
| Korean Film Awards | 2006 | Best Actress | Family Ties | Nominated | |
| Korean Film Awards | 2007 | Best Supporting Actress | Happiness | Won | |
| Korean Film Awards | 2008 | Best Actress | Crush and Blush | Won | |
| Korea Film Actors Association Awards | 2016 | Korea's Top Star | Missing | Won | |
| Korea Visual Arts Festival | 2008 | Photogenic Award | Crush and Blush | Won | |
| MBC Drama Awards | 2002 | Popularity Award | Ruler of Your Own World | Won | |
| MBC Drama Awards | 2003 | Excellence Award, Actress | Snowman | Nominated | |
| MBC Drama Awards | 2007 | Top Excellence Award, Actress | Thank You | Won | |
| MBC Drama Awards | 2010 | Top Excellence Award, Actress | Pasta | Won | |
| MBC Drama Awards | 2010 | Best Couple Award | Gong Hyo-jin with Lee Sun-kyun; Pasta | Won | |
| MBC Drama Awards | 2011 | Top Excellence Award, Actress in a Miniseries | The Greatest Love | Won | |
| MBC Drama Awards | 2011 | Popularity Award | The Greatest Love | Won | |
| MBC Drama Awards | 2011 | Best Couple Award | Gong Hyo-jin with Cha Seung-won; The Greatest Love | Won | |
| Mnet 20's Choice Awards | 2011 | Hot Style Icon | Gong Hyo-jin | Won | |
| Mnet 20's Choice Awards | 2011 | Hot Drama Star – Female | The Greatest Love | Won | |
| New York Asian Film Festival | 2009 | Rising Star Asia Award | Crush and Blush | Won | |
| SBS Drama Awards | 2001 | New Star Award | Wonderful Days | Won | |
| SBS Drama Awards | 2013 | Top Excellence Award, Actress in a Miniseries | Master's Sun | Nominated | |
| SBS Drama Awards | 2014 | Top Excellence Award, Actress in a Miniseries | It's Okay, That's Love | Won | |
| SBS Drama Awards | 2014 | Best Couple Award | Gong Hyo-jin with Zo In-sung; It's Okay, That's Love | Won | |
| SBS Drama Awards | 2016 | Top Excellence Award, Actress in a Romantic Comedy Drama | Don't Dare to Dream | Won | |
| Seoul International Drama Awards | 2020 | Best Actress | When the Camellia Blooms | Won | |
| Style Icon Awards | 2010 | Style Leader | Gong Hyo-jin | Won | |
| Style Icon Awards | 2013 | Style Icon Award | Gong Hyo-jin | Won | |
| Thessaloniki International Film Festival | 2006 | Best Actress | Family Ties | Won | |
| Women in Film Korea Awards | 2008 | Best Actress | Crush and Blush | Won | |

=== State honors ===
Name of country, year given, and name of honor
| Country Or Organization | Year | Honor Or Award | Ref. |
|---|---|---|---|
| South Korea (Note: Honors are given at the Korean Popular Culture and Arts Awards, arranged by the Korea Creative Content Agency and hosted by the Ministry of Culture, Sports and Tourism. They are awarded to those who have contributed to the arts and South Korea's pop culture.) | 2020 | Prime Minister Commendation | |

=== Listicles ===
Name of publisher, year listed, name of listicle, and placement
| Publisher | Year | Listicle | Placement | Ref. |
|---|---|---|---|---|
| Forbes | 2020 | Korea Power Celebrity | 26th | |
| Gallup Korea | 2019 | Television Actor of the Year | 1st | |
| Gallup Korea | 2024 | Best Television Couple of the Past Decade (Note: With Kang Ha-neul for When the Camellia Blooms (2019)) | 7th | |
