= Smile, You =

- Promotional poster
- Also known as: Smile, Honey; Smile, Dear; Smile, Love; You Smile
- Genre: Comedy; Romance; Drama
- Written by: Moon Hee-jung
- Directed by: Lee Tae-gon
- Starring: Lee Min-jung; Jung Kyung-ho
- Country of origin: South Korea
- Original language: Korean
- No. of episodes: 45

Production
- Production company: Logos Film

Original release
- Network: SBS TV
- Release: 26 September 2009 – 7 March 2010

Smile, You (Korean: 그대, 웃어요; RR: Geudae, useoyo) is a 2009 South Korean television series starring Lee Min-jung and Jung Kyung-ho, in their first leading roles in a Korean drama. Directed by Lee Tae-gon and written by Moon Hee-jung, it aired on SBS from September 26, 2009, to March 7, 2010, on Saturdays and Sundays at 21:45 for 45 episodes. In the drama, a wealthy household's fall from grace forces them to bunk with their ex-chauffeur's family.

== Synopsis ==
Seo Jung-in is the third child of a rich family. She gets dumped by her groom Lee Han-se on their wedding day after his family finds out that the Seo family has gone bankrupt, with Han-se literally leaving her stranded on the highway. She stops a taxi, causing trouble for a bus where Kang Hyun-soo, who had just gotten back to Korea after studying in the United States, sits. He is in love with Jung-in's older sister, Jung-kyung, who was Hyun-soo's classmate in college. Jung-in ends up being taken in by the family of Kang Man-bok, their former chauffeur. She discovers that Hyun-soo, with whom she's had many bickering encounters, is Man-bok's grandson. Planning to run to their eldest son, Seo Sung-joon (a professional golf player overseas), the Seo family is about to leave the country when the police arrest their father and puts him in jail. The Seo's then discover that their house was sold from under them. With nowhere else to go, they, too, are forced to live with the Kang family.

As time passes, both families get closer to each other. Jung-in in particular adjusts to normal life and falls in love with Hyun-soo, despite knowing his feelings for her older sister. Jung-in now has a job in Han-se's automobile company, where Hyun-soo also works. Eventually, Hyun-soo realizes that his feelings for Jung-kyung have faded and he is more comfortable with Jung-in. Hyun-soo and Jung-in begin dating, but they keep it secret because Hyun-soo's mother doesn't like Jung-in.

Meanwhile, Han-se regrets giving up Jung-in. He sacrifices Global Motors to prove that Jung-in is more important to him than anyone else. Also, Hyun-soo and Jung-in's relationship is put to the test when Jung-kyung suddenly realizes that she likes Hyun-soo, leading to confusion and soul-searching from Hyun-soo.

Despite the obstacles they go through (their parents' disapproval, Hyun-soo's grandfather Man-bok diagnosed with liver cancer), the couple remain in love and at peace with each other. At the end, Hyun-soo and Jung-in are married, with twins. Jung-in's brother Sung-joon also marries his sweetheart Ji-soo.

== Cast ==
Seo family

- Lee Min-jung as Seo Jung-in
- Lee Chun-hee as Seo Sung-joon
- Choi Jung-yoon as Seo Jung-kyung
- Kang Seok-woo as Seo Jung-gil
- Heo Yoon-jung as Gong Joo-hee

Kang family

- Jung Kyung-ho as Kang Hyun-soo
- Choi Bool-am as Kang Man-bok
- Chun Ho-jin as Kang Sang-hoon
- Song Ok-sook as Baek Geum-ja

Extended cast

- Lee Kyu-han as Lee Han-se
- Jeon Hae-jin as Jung Ji-soo
- Yoon Joo-sang as Lee Joon-bae
- Choi Kwon as Park Kyung-soo
- Park Joon-geum as Han-se's mother
- Jung So-nyeo as So-nyeo
- Hong Il-kwon as Han Min-joon
- Han Bo-bae as Han Yoon-jae
- Choi Song-hyun as Hong Sun-woo
- Jung Min-sung as Secretary Kim
- Ji Yoo as BEAT member
- Jo Yoon-hee as Hyun-soo's blind date (cameo)

== Awards ==
2009 SBS Drama Awards

- Best Supporting Actor in a Special Planning Drama: Kang Seok-woo
- PD Award: Jung Kyung-ho
- New Star Award: Lee Min-jung

== Remake ==
Smile, You was the first Korean drama to be remade in India, and Zindagi Kahe – Smile Please ("Life Says - Smile Please") aired on Life OK in 2011–2012. A Turkish remake titled Gülümse Yeter began airing in July 2016.
