= Jeon Hae-jin =

South Korean actress

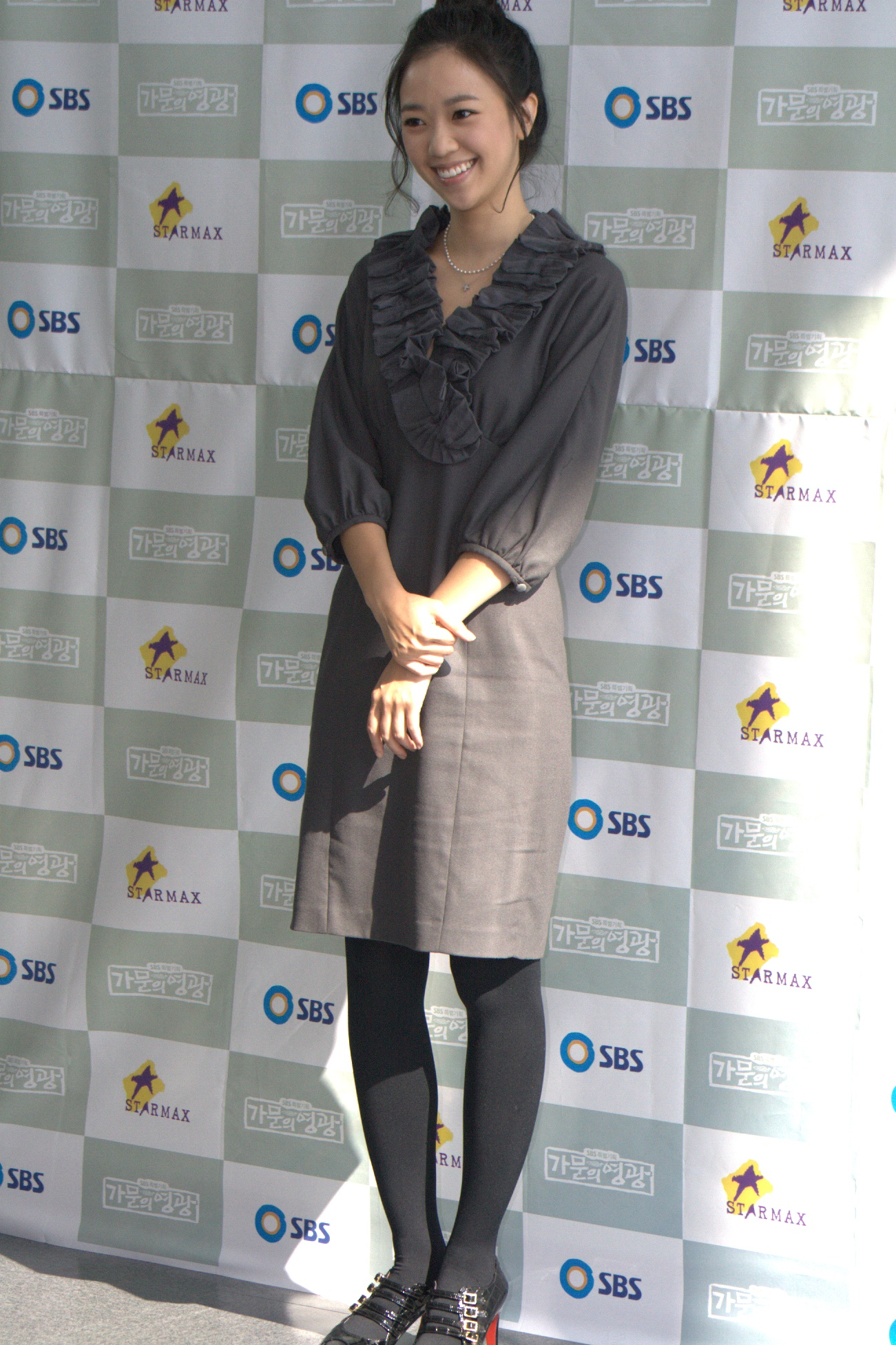
- Jeon in 2008
- Born: June 17, 1988 (age 38); Seoul, South Korea
- Occupation: Actress
- Years active: 1996–present
- Agent: Management SOOP
- Spouse: Lee Chun-hee (m. 2011)
- Children: 1

Korean name
- Hangul: 전혜진
- Hanja: 全惠璡
- RR: Jeon Hyejin
- MR: Chŏn Hyejin

Jeon Hae-jin (Korean: 전혜진; born June 17, 1988) is a South Korean actress.

== Personal life ==
Jeon married her Smile, You co-star Lee Chun-hee on March 11, 2011. Their daughter, Lee So-yu, was born on July 30, 2011.

== Filmography ==
=== Film ===
Year	Title	Role	Notes/Ref.
1999	Spooky School		
2004	Love, So Divine	Sesame	
2006	Family Matters		
2007	Shadows in the Palace	Jung-Ryeol	
2010	Bloody Shake		
2014	Venus Talk	Kim Soo-Jung	
2015	Revivre	Oh Mi-Young	
2015	Collective Invention	Narrator	
2022	Ordinary Courage	Herself	Environmental documentary film
2023	Punch-Drunk Love	Bok-hee	

=== Television series ===
Year	Title	Role
2002	Ruler of Your Own World	Song Hyun-ji
2003	Million Roses	
2008	Family's Honor	Lee Hye-Joo
2009	Smile, You	Jung Ji-soo
2010	Oh! My Lady	cameo, ep 1
2018	Mother	Yi-jin
2022	My Liberation Notes	Hyun-ah
2023	Agency	Jo Eun-jung
2024	The Trunk (TV series)	Jeong Si-Jeong

=== Television shows ===
Year	Title	Role	Notes	Ref.
2021	Public Land	Cast Member	with Gong Hyo-jin and Lee Chun-hee	

== Discography ==
=== Soundtrack appearances ===
Title	Year	Album
"Ordinary Brave" (보통의 용기) (with Gong Hyo-jin and Lee Chun-hee)	2022	Ordinary Courage OST
