= Humming (film) =

- Theatrical poster
- Directed by: Park Dae-young
- Written by: Jung Sun-joo
- Produced by: Lee Min-ho
- Starring: Lee Chun-hee; Han Ji-hye
- Cinematography: Hong Jong-gyeong
- Edited by: Ko Im-pyo
- Music by: Park Ji-man
- Production companies: The Dream & Pictures
- Distributed by: Lotte Entertainment
- Release date: March 13, 2008
- Running time: 96 minutes
- Country: South Korea
- Language: Korean

Humming (Korean: 허밍; RR: Heoming) is a 2008 South Korean romance drama film starring Lee Chun-hee and Han Ji-hye.

== Plot ==
Joon-seo (Lee Chun-hee), a talented young scientist, is bored with his relationship with diving instructor Mi-yeon (Han Ji-hye) and plans to go on a research trip to Antarctica in order to get away for a while. But one day tragedy strikes, and Mi-yeon becomes comatose after an accident.

== Cast ==
- Lee Chun-hee as Joon-seo
- Han Ji-hye as Mi-yeon
- Jung Jae-jin as professor
- Park Choong-seon as bodyguard
- Kim Cheol-heung as laundromat man
- Son Eun-seo as veterinarian
- Lee Min-ki as Oh Chun-jae, Joon-seo's friend (cameo)
- Lee Hwi-hyang as Mi-yeon's aunt (cameo)

== Box office ==
It drew 104,850 admissions, grossing ₩642,352,000.
