= Management Soop =

South Korean actors agency

Management SOOP
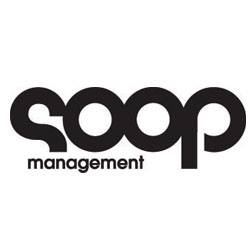
- Native name: 매니지먼트 숲
- Type: Private
- Industry: Entertainment
- Founded: April 19, 2011; 15 years ago
- Founder: Kim Jang-kyun
- Headquarters: Seoul, South Korea
- Area served: Asia
- Key people: Kim Jang-kyun (CEO, President)
- Services: Actors Management
- Owner: Kakao Entertainment (99.36%)
- Parent: Kakao Entertainment
- Website: msoopent.com

Management SOOP Corporation (Korean: (주)숲엔터테인먼트) t/a Management SOOP (Korean: 매니지먼트 숲) is a South Korean actors agency that was established in 2011, and is currently operating as a subsidiary of Kakao Entertainment (a Kakao company). The roster includes actors Jeon Do-yeon, Gong Yoo, Gong Hyo-jin, Jung Yu-mi, Kim Jae-wook, Seo Hyun-jin, Choi Woo-shik, Nam Joo-hyuk, Bae Suzy, Nam Ji-hyun, and Kim Min-ju, among others.

== History ==
Management SOOP was founded on April 19, 2011, by Kim Jang-kyun, who formerly worked for SidusHQ and Network of Asia (N.O.A) Entertainment (now Fantagio).

Gong Yoo, Lim Soo-jeong, Gong Hyo-jin, and Jung Il-woo left NOA Entertainment at the end of April and move to the new company SOOP. It had been 2 years and 6 months since they started working at NOA in October 2008.

On June 27, 2018, Kakao M (now Kakao Entertainment) shared an update following reports that it was in talks to acquire entertainment agencies and created partnerships with three actor management agencies BH Entertainment, J.Wide Company, Management SOOP, and Korea's leading advertisement model casting agency Ready Entertainment in order to globalize its content.

== Artists ==
=== Actors ===
- Gong Yoo
- Jang Sung-hoon
- Kim Jae-wook
- Lee Chun-hee
- Nam Joo-hyuk
- Jung Ga-ram

=== Actresses ===
- Gong Hyo-jin
- Seo Hyun-jin
- Jeon Do-yeon
- Nam Ji-hyun
- Kim Ji-su
- Bae Suzy
- Kim Min-ju
- Jeon Hye-jin
- Lee Chung-ah
- Shin Eun-soo
- Yoo Chan-a
- Shin Si-ah

== Former artists ==
- Choi Woo-shik
- Jeon So-nee
- Jung Il-woo
- Kim Min-hee
- Kim Tae-geum
- Lee Jae-joon
- Ryoo Seung-bum
- Soo Ae
- Yoo Min-kyu
- Park Yeon-woo
- Jung Yu-mi
