= Gloria (South Korean TV series) =

South Korean television series

- Promotional poster
- Genre: Family; Romance
- Written by: Jung Ji-woo
- Directed by: Kim Min-shik; Kim Kyung-hee
- Starring: Bae Doona; Lee Chun-hee; Seo Ji-seok; So Yi-hyun
- Ending theme: "빈털터리" by Kan Jong-wook Lyrics by Kan Jong-woo
- Country of origin: South Korea
- Original language: Korean
- No. of episodes: 50

Production
- Executive producer: Lee Dae-young
- Producers: Yongwon Choi; Shin Young Enc, Kim Hyun-jung
- Production companies: Shinyoung E&C Group

Original release
- Network: MBC
- Release: July 31, 2010 – January 30, 2011

Gloria (Korean: 글로리아) is a South Korean television series starring Bae Doona, Lee Chun-hee, Seo Ji-seok, So Yi-hyun, Oh Hyun-kyung and Lee Jong-won in a tale of romance, survival, overcoming poverty and adversity, and making your dreams come true. It aired on MBC from July 31, 2010 to January 30, 2011 on Saturdays and Sundays at 20:40 for 50 episodes.

== Plot ==
After their parents were killed in a car accident, Na Jin-jin (Bae Doona) has lived with her mentally handicapped older sister Na Jin-joo (Oh Hyun-kyung), whom she has supported from a young age. Jin-jin barely ekes out a living juggling a series of dead-end part-time jobs, including delivering newspapers and running a nightclub coat check. One day, the nightclub's regular singer doesn't show up and when Jin-jin is asked to fill in, she performs an impromptu version of Laura Branigan's "Gloria." Jin-jin becomes consumed with the idea of becoming a nightclub singer and sees it as her only hope to escape her humdrum life, saying that she only feels alive when she's onstage.

Jin-jin grew up with Ha Dong-ah (Lee Chun-hee), who has remained her loyal friend through everything, as he himself raises his young nephew. But Dong-ah, a gifted fighter, turns to a life in the mob.

Lee Kang-suk (Seo Ji-seok), the illegitimate son of a wealthy family and president of a record label, begins pursuing Jin-jin, while suicidal ex-ballet dancer Jung Yoon-seo (So Yi-hyun) catches Dong-ah's eye.

== Cast ==
Na family

- Bae Doona as Na Jin-jin
  - Lee Ji-eun as young Jin-jin
- Oh Hyun-kyung as Na Jin-joo (Jin-jin's older sister)

Ha family

- Lee Chun-hee as Ha Dong-ah
- Chun Bo-geun as Ha Eo-jin (Dong-ah's nephew)
- Han Jin-hee as Ha Man-soo (Dong-ah's father)

Lee family

- Seo Ji-seok as Lee Kang-suk
- Lee Jong-won as Lee Ji-suk (Kang-suk's half brother)
- Yeon Kyu-jin as Lee Joon-ho (Kang-suk and Ji-suk's father)
- Sung Byung-sook as Ms. Song (Ji-suk's mother)

Jung family

- So Yi-hyun as Jung Yoon-seo
- Kim Ki-hyun as President Jung (Yoon-seo's father)
- Jung So-nyeo as Yoon-seo's mother

Nightclub

- Na Young-hee as Yeo Jung-nan (former singer, Kang-suk's mother)
- Lee Young-ha as Jung Woo-hyun (nightclub owner)
- Choi Jae-hwan as Park Dong-chul (waiter)
- Ha Yeon-joo as Yoo Mi-na (female backup singer)
- Jo Hyang-ki as Tae-soon (female backup singer)

Double Sharp Entertainment

- Park Hyun-sook as Choi Ji-young (talent agency director)
- Lee Sang-woo as vocal coach

Extended cast

- Kim Young-ok as Oh Soon-nyeo
- Lee Sung-min as Son Jong-bum
- Kim Byung-choon as Lee Yoon-bae
- Lee Jong-bak as Dae-bak
- ZE:A as singer trainees
- Moon Joon-young as Singer trainee
- Min Joon-hyun

== Awards and nominations ==
Year	Award	Category	Recipient	Result
2010	MBC Drama Awards	Excellence Award, Actor	Lee Chun-hee	Nominated
2010	MBC Drama Awards	Excellence Award, Actress	Bae Doona	Nominated
2010	MBC Drama Awards	Family Award	Gloria	Won
