= The School Nurse Files =

2020 South Korean comedy fantasy television series

- Promotional poster
- Hangul: 보건교사 안은영
- Hanja: 保健教師 안은영
- Lit.: School Nurse Ahn Eun-young
- RR: Bogeon gyosa An Eunyeong
- MR: Pogŏn kyosa An Ŭnyŏng
- Genre: Comedy; Fantasy; Superhero
- Based on: School Nurse Ahn Eun-young by Chung Serang
- Written by: Chung Serang; Lee Kyoung-mi
- Directed by: Lee Kyoung-mi
- Starring: Jung Yu-mi; Nam Joo-hyuk
- Country of origin: South Korea
- Original language: Korean
- No. of episodes: 6

Production
- Executive producers: Park Seong-hye; Shin Yeon-ju
- Running time: 46–58 minutes
- Production company: KeyEast

Original release
- Network: Netflix
- Release: September 25, 2020

The School Nurse Files (Korean: 보건교사 안은영) is a 2020 South Korean television series starring Jung Yu-mi and Nam Joo-hyuk. Based on the 2015 award-winning novel School Nurse Ahn Eun-young by Chung Serang, it was released on Netflix on September 25, 2020.

== Synopsis ==
Ahn Eun-young is a school nurse with the power to see human desires, feelings, and spirits that exist in the form of "jellies". Some of these jellies can take on dangerous, monstrous forms. Ahn is appointed to a new high school where mysterious incidents are taking place. Along with a fellow teacher, Hong In-pyo, a man with a special energy field around him that protects him from jellies, she tries to solve these mysterious cases.

== Cast ==
=== Main ===
- Jung Yu-mi as Ahn Eun-young, a school nurse who can see jellies
- Nam Joo-hyuk as Hong In-pyo, a Classical Chinese teacher with a special energy field protecting him from jellies

=== Supporting ===
- Lee Joo-young as Han Ah-reum, Life Sciences teacher
- Kim Mi-soo as Hwang Ga-young, In-pyo's elementary school classmate
- Go Youn-jung as Choi Yoo-jin
- Teo Yoo as Mr. Mackenzie, English teacher

=== Monglyeon High School Students ===
- Park Hye-Eun as Sung A-ra "Jellyfish"
- Lee Suk-hyung as Min-woo, student
- Choi Joon-young as Kim Kang-sun, Eun-young's middle school classmate
- Hyun Woo-seok as Seung-kwon, student
- Kwon Young-chan as Lee Ji-hyung, student
- Park Se-jin as Jang Radi, student
- Song Hee-jun as Baek Hye-min, student
- Shim Dal-gi as Heo Wan-soo, student

=== Special appearances ===
- Lee Kyu-sung as student
- Lee Jong-won as student
- Jeon Gook-hwan as Hong Jin-beom, Monglyeon High School founder and In-pyo's grandfather
- Moon So-ri as Hwa-soo, director of acupuncture institute and Eun-young's friend

== Episodes ==
No.	Title	Directed by	Written by	Original release date
1	"Episode 1"	Lee Kyoung-mi	Chung Serang & Lee Kyoung-mi	September 25, 2020
Ahn Eun-young enters the forbidden basement as Hong In-pyo reluctantly trails along. They join hands when a dark secret shakes up the school.
2	"Episode 2"	Lee Kyoung-mi	Chung Serang & Lee Kyoung-mi	September 25, 2020
When the bond between two troublemaking students catches Eun-young's eye, In-pyo proposes unconventional ideas to split and keep them apart.
3	"Episode 3"	Lee Kyoung-mi	Chung Serang & Lee Kyoung-mi	September 25, 2020
Eun-young and In-pyo get knotty behind closed doors. With Mackenzie's support, a student settles the score with the basketball team.
4	"Episode 4"	Lee Kyoung-mi	Chung Serang & Lee Kyoung-mi	September 25, 2020
Baek Hye-min introduces herself to Eun-young as a new transfer student and presents a solution to a mite infestation that's hard to stomach.
5	"Episode 5"	Lee Kyoung-mi	Chung Serang & Lee Kyoung-mi	September 25, 2020
Eun-young reunites with an old friend. With sympathy for Hye-min's lonely world, Eun-young seeks out ways to help her outlive her fate.
6	"Episode 6"	Lee Kyoung-mi	Chung Serang & Lee Kyoung-mi	September 25, 2020
Evil floods the school with uncontrollable negative energy. Eun-young reaches her limit and makes a difficult decision with In-pyo by her side.

== Production ==
=== Development ===
On December 19, 2018, Netflix announced that it would produce a 6-part adaptation of the South Korean novel School Nurse Ahn Eun-young. Its author, Chung Serang, wrote the series, while Lee Kyoung-mi, who previously wrote and directed an episode of the anthology series Persona for the streaming platform, served as the director. The series is produced for Netflix by KeyEast.

=== Casting ===
It was revealed that Jung Yu-mi would portray the titular role when Netflix announced the commission of the series. On March 8, 2019, Nam Joo-hyuk was confirmed to have joined the main cast.

=== Filming ===
Filming took place during mid 2019.

== Release ==
On August 14, 2020, it was announced that the series would be released on September 25.
