= Min Joon-ki =

South Korean film director (born 1968)

- Born: February 19, 1968 (age 57); South Korea
- Occupation(s): Film director, screenwriter

Korean name
- Hangul: 민준기
- RR: Min Jungi
- MR: Min Chun'gi

Min Joon-ki (Korean: 민준기; born February 19, 1968) is a South Korean film director. He wrote and directed Heaven's Soldiers (2005), in which Halley's Comet causes North and South Korean soldiers to travel back in time from 2005 to 1572, where they join Korean national hero Yi Sun-sin in fighting the Jurchen tribes.

== Filmography ==
- Heaven's Soldiers (2005) - director, screenplay
- A Man and a Woman on an Island (1992) - assistant director
