= Lee Kyoung-mi =

South Korean film director and screenwriter

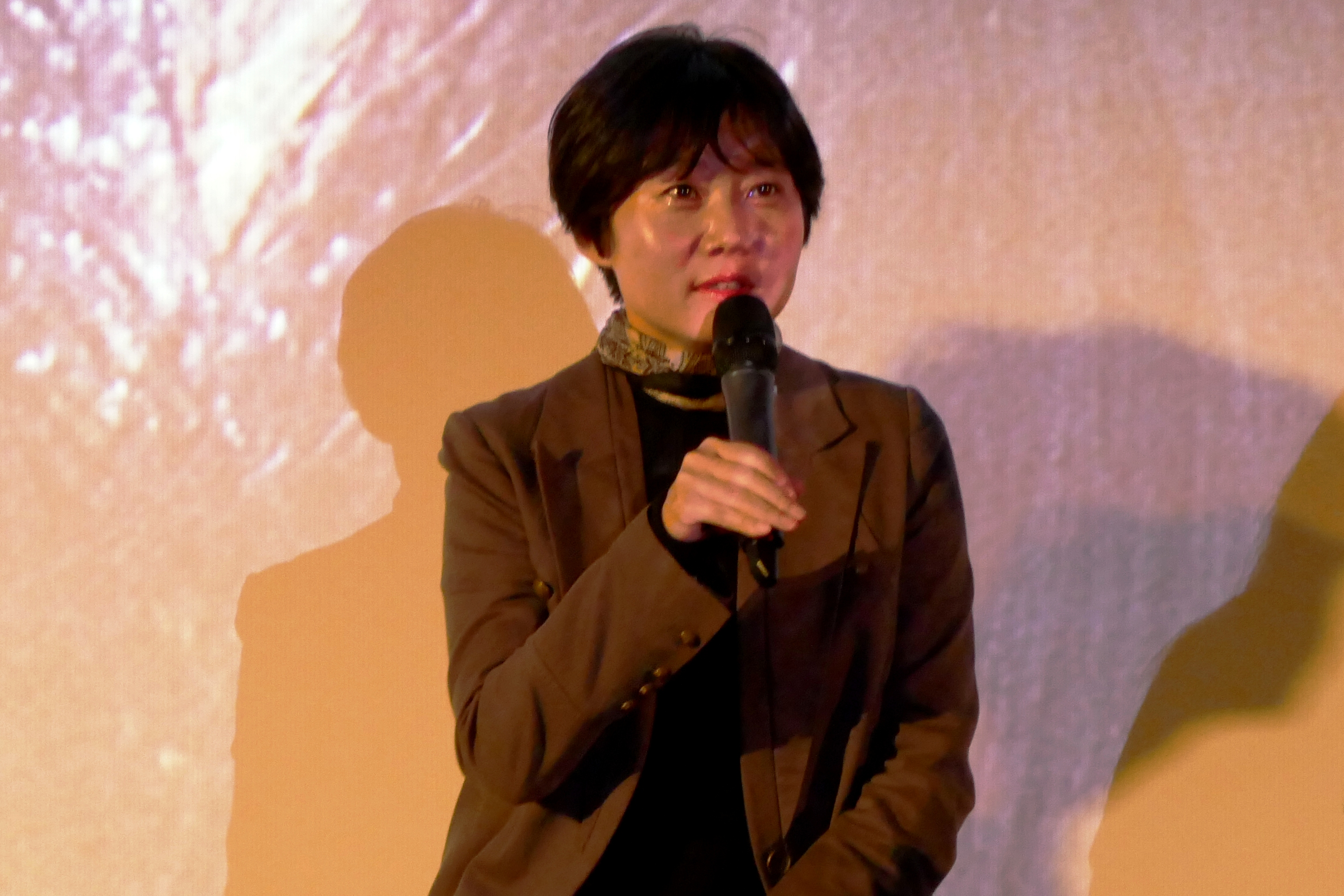
- Lee in 2016
- Born: 1973 (age 52–53); Seoul, South Korea
- Education: Hankuk University of Foreign Studies - Russian; Korea National University of Arts - Filmmaking
- Occupations: Film director, screenwriter
- Years active: 2000-present
- Spouse: Pierce Conran (m. 2018)

Korean name
- Hangul: 이경미
- RR: I Gyeongmi
- MR: I Kyŏngmi

Lee Kyoung-mi (Korean: 이경미 Korean pronunciation: [igjʌngmi]; born December 1973) is a South Korean film director and screenwriter. She is widely recognized for her distinctive and often darkly comedic storytelling, frequently featuring complex female protagonists. Lee rose to prominence with her critically acclaimed feature directorial debut, Crush and Blush (2008), which earned her the Best New Director and Best Screenplay awards at the Blue Dragon Film Awards. Her notable works also include the mystery thriller The Truth Beneath (2016) and the Netflix series The School Nurse Files (2020).

== Early life and education ==
Lee Kyoung-mi was born in Seoul. She initially aspired to be a theater actor, but her father, a theater director, strongly opposed her pursuing a degree in theater and film. Despite her wishes, she discovered he had applied to the Russian language department for her university admission, a field growing in popularity due to burgeoning diplomatic relations with Russia. After enrolling, she briefly explored theater classes but withdrew, finding that continuing theater in a collegiate setting prevented her from moving past the disappointment of not entering a theater program. Consequently, she focused on Russian studies, eventually earning a degree from Hankuk University of Foreign Studies.

After graduating, Lee worked for three years in a company unrelated to film, where she experienced sexual harassment from her superior. During this challenging period, she joined an online movie club and learned about the Film Academy. She subsequently resigned from her job. In 2004, she enrolled in the School of Film, TV & Multimedia at the Korea National University of Arts. She had initially applied to the Film Academy hoping to transfer to a theater department, as it did not require the CSAT or practical skills unlike other programs. She admitted her naiveté during the entrance exam, not even knowing what a storyboard was at the time.

Her interest to filmmaking began after she saw The Big Blue, watching it five times after a church screening. Prior to this, her only film experiences were Happiness Is Not in Grades and The Peacock King. She debut as director with short film Audition in 2003. Her graduation project, the short film Feel Good Story, which depicts an employee tasked with corporate tax evasion, received several awards on the film festival circuit in 2004.

== Career ==
Lee Kyung-mi began her career as an assistant director and scripter on Park Chan-wook's 2005 film Sympathy for Lady Vengeance. The two met at the 3rd Mise-en-scène Short Film Festival, where Park was a judge and Lee won the grand prize for her short film Feel Good Story.

Lee made her feature directorial debut with Crush and Blush (2008), a black comedy about an obsessive teacher and an outcast student who bond over their shared misanthropy; a critic called it "one of those rare films from an up-and-coming auteur that shows both guts and playfulness." It was the first film to be produced by Park Chan-wook. Crush and Blush premiered at the 13th Busan International Film Festival, and was released in theaters on October 16, 2008. Lee won Best New Director and Best Screenplay at the Blue Dragon Film Awards in 2008.

Lee also made special appearances in films directed by Ryoo Seung-wan, such as The Unjust (2010), and The Berlin File (2013).

Lee second feature film was the mystery thriller film The Truth Beneath, released on June 23, 2016. She co-wrote the script with Park Chan-wook and Jeong Seo-kyeong, and the film stars Son Ye-jin and Kim Joo-hyuk. For her direction of The Truth Beneath, Lee received the Best Director award at the 36th Korean Association of Film Critics Awards, and Best Screenplay at both the 17th Women in Film Korea Festival and the 22nd Chunsa Film Awards. The film also won the Audience Award at the 11th Festival du Film Coréen à Paris (FFCP). Lee was also nominated for Best Director and Best New Director at the 25th Buil Film Awards, and for the Grand Prix at the 31st Fribourg International Film Festival, all in 2016. In the same year, Lee was honored with the Gender Equality Culture Person of the Year Award.

In 2018, Lee published an essay collection titled Are You Well? Anything. On December 19, 2018, Netflix announced its plans to produce a six-part adaptation of Chung Serang's 2015 award-winning novel, School Nurse Ahn Eun-young, with Lee directing. Chung Serang co-wrote the series with Lee. Produced for Netflix by KeyEast and starring Jung Yu-mi and Nam Joo-hyuk, series The School Nurse Files premiered on Netflix on September 25, 2020.

In 2019, Lee was one of four directors to contribute to Persona, an anthology series released globally on Netflix in April. The series, produced by Mystic Entertainment, stars Lee Ji-eun (IU) in four distinct roles, each interpreted through the unique vision of a different director. Lee directed "Love Set," a short film within the anthology that depicts an intense tennis match between two women, showcasing her distinctive storytelling style alongside works from Yim Pil-sung, Jeon Go-woon, and Kim Jong-kwan.

Lee's most recent work is Park Chan-wook's No Other Choice, a film based on Donald E. Westlake's horror novel The Ax. Lee acted as scriptwriter, adapting the novel with Park, Don McKellar, and Jahye Lee. The film was produced by Park and Back Jisun from Moho Film, and Michèle Ray Gavras and Alexandre Gavras from KG Productions. Miky Lee of CJ Group served as executive producer, with CJ ENM financing the project. No Other Choice will have its world premiere in the main competition of the 82nd Venice International Film Festival, where it is nominated for the Golden Lion. It is scheduled for a theatrical release in South Korea in September 2025.

== Personal life ==
In 2018, Lee married Pierce Conran, an Irish-Swiss film journalist and producer who has been based in Seoul since 2012.

== Filmography ==
=== Feature films ===
Year	Film	Credited as			Notes
Year	Film	Director	Writer	Other Roles	Notes
2005	Sympathy for Lady Vengeance	—N/a	—N/a	scripter	
2008	Crush and Blush	Yes	Yes	music	
2010	The Unjust	—N/a	—N/a	actress	
2013	The Berlin File	—N/a	—N/a	actress	
2016	The Truth Beneath	Yes	Yes	—N/a	
2025	No Other Choice	—N/a	Yes	—N/a	

=== Short films ===
Year	Film	Credited as			Notes
Year	Film	Assistant director	Director	Writer	Notes
2000	Myoung-suk and Me	—N/a	Yes	—N/a	
2001	Lies	—N/a	Yes	—N/a	
2001	Memories	—N/a	Yes	—N/a	
2002	Today's horoscope	—N/a	—N/a	—N/a	as sound
2002	A Crystal Globe	Yes	—N/a	—N/a	
2003	Super Morse	Yes	—N/a	—N/a	
2003	Audition	—N/a	Yes	Yes	Director's debut, also cinematographer
2003	Radio Dreams	—N/a	—N/a	—N/a	as sound
2003	Quick Service	—N/a	—N/a	—N/a	as actress
2003	Feel Good Story	—N/a	Yes	Yes	
2009	Timeless	—N/a	—N/a	—N/a	as actress
2017	The Lady from 406	—N/a	Yes	Yes	

=== Television ===
Year	Title	Credited as		Note(s)	Ref.
Year	Title	Director	Writer	Note(s)	Ref.
2019	Persona; Segment: Love Set	Yes	Yes	Netflix anthology series	
2020	The School Nurse Files	Yes	co-writer	Netflix Original Series	

== Awards and nominations ==
List of awards and nominations received by Lee
Award	Year	Category	Recipients	Result	Ref
Asiana International Short Film Festival	2004	Grand Prize	Feel Good Story	Won	
Baeksang Arts Awards	2009	Best New Director	The Truth Beneath	Nominated	
Baeksang Arts Awards	2009	Best Screenplay	The Truth Beneath	Nominated	
Blue Dragon Film Awards	2008	Best New Director	Crush and Blush	Won	
Blue Dragon Film Awards	2008	Best Screenplay	Crush and Blush	Won	
25th Buil Film Awards	2016	Best Director	The Truth Beneath	Nominated	
25th Buil Film Awards	2016	Best New Director	The Truth Beneath	Nominated	
Busan Asian Short Film Festival	2004	Camellia Grand Prize	Feel Good Story	Won	
17th Busan Film Critics Awards	2016	Best Film	The Truth Beneath	Won	
Cine21 Film Awards	2016	Best Film	The Truth Beneath	3rd place	
22nd Chunsa Film Awards	2016	Best Screenplay	The Truth Beneath	Won	
11th Festival du Film Coréen à Paris (FFCP)	2016	Audience Award	The Truth Beneath	Won	
31st Fribourg International Film Festival	2016	Grand Prix	The Truth Beneath	Nominated	
36th Korean Association of Film Critics Awards	2016	Ten Best Films of the Year	The Truth Beneath	Won	
36th Korean Association of Film Critics Awards	2016	Best Director	The Truth Beneath	Won	
Korean Film Awards	2008	Best New Director	Crush and Blush	Nominated	
Mise-en-scène Short Film Festival	2004	Best Film in A City of Sadness	Feel Good Story	Won	
Seoul International Women's Film Festival	2004	Grand Prize, People's Choice Award	Feel Good Story	Won	
Women in Film Korea Festival	2008	Best Director	Crush and Blush	Won	
Women in Film Korea Festival	2008	Best Screenplay	Crush and Blush	Won	
Women in Film Korea Festival	2016	Best Screenplay	The Truth Beneath	Won	

=== Listicle ===
- Cine 21 Female Filmmaker
