= Crush and Blush =

2008 film by Lee Kyoung-mi

- Theatrical poster
- Hangul: 미쓰 홍당무
- RR: Misseu hongdangmu
- MR: Missŭ hongdangmu
- Directed by: Lee Kyoung-mi
- Written by: Lee Kyoung-mi; Park Eun-kyo; Park Chan-wook
- Produced by: Park Chan-wook
- Starring: Gong Hyo-jin; Seo Woo; Lee Jong-hyuk; Hwang Woo-seul-hye
- Cinematography: Kim Dong-young
- Edited by: Shin Min-kyung
- Music by: Jang Young-gyu
- Distributed by: Vantage Holdings
- Release date: October 16, 2008
- Running time: 101 minutes
- Country: South Korea
- Language: Korean
- Budget: ₩1 billion
- Box office: US$2.6 million

Crush and Blush (Korean: 미쓰 홍당무; lit. 'Miss Hongdangmu; Miss Carrot') is a 2008 South Korean comedy film. It is the feature film debut of director Lee Kyoung-mi.

Crush and Blush premiered at the 13th Pusan International Film Festival, and went on general release in South Korea on October 16, 2010.

== Plot ==
Yang Mi-sook is an unpopular and frumpy high school Russian teacher who has a habit of going red in the face. For ten years she has been harbouring a crush on Seo Jong-cheol, her former teacher and now married colleague, though he is more interested in pretty new teacher Lee Yoo-ri. Mi-sook tries to put a halt to this blossoming romance, forming an unlikely alliance with Jong-cheol's daughter, Jong-hee.

== Cast ==
- Gong Hyo-jin as Yang Mi-sook
- Seo Woo as Seo Jong-hee
- Lee Jong-hyuk as Seo Jong-cheol
- Hwang Woo-seul-hye as Lee Yoo-ri
- Bang Eun-jin as Seong Eun-gyo
- Bong Joon-ho as teacher (cameo)

== Awards and nominations ==
Award	Category	Recipients	Result	Ref
Blue Dragon Film Awards	Best Actress	Gong Hyo-jin	Nominated	
Blue Dragon Film Awards	Best New Director	Lee Kyoung-mi	Won	
Blue Dragon Film Awards	Best Screenplay	Lee Kyoung-mi	Won	
Blue Dragon Film Awards	Best New Actress	Seo Woo	Nominated	
Blue Dragon Film Awards	Best New Actress	Hwang Woo-seul-hye	Nominated	
Korean Film Awards	Best Actress	Gong Hyo-jin	Won	
Korean Film Awards	Best New Actress	Seo Woo	Won	
Korean Film Awards	Best New Director	Lee Kyoung-mi	Nominated	
Director's Cut Awards	Best Actress	Gong Hyo-jin	Won	
Director's Cut Awards	Best New Actress	Seo Woo	Won	
Director's Cut Awards	Best Producer	Park Chan-wook	Won	
Women in Film Korea Awards	Best Director	Lee Kyoung-mi	Won	
Women in Film Korea Awards	Best Actress	Gong Hyo-jin	Won	
Women in Film Korea Awards	Best Screenplay	Lee Kyoung-mi	Won	
Baeksang Arts Awards	Best Actress	Gong Hyo-jin	Nominated	
Baeksang Arts Awards	Best New Director	Lee Kyoung-mi	Nominated	
Baeksang Arts Awards	Best Screenplay	Lee Kyoung-mi	Nominated	
Baeksang Arts Awards	Best New Actress	Seo Woo	Nominated	
Baeksang Arts Awards	Best New Actress	Hwang Woo-seul-hye	Nominated	
New York Asian Film Festival	Rising Star Award	Gong Hyo-jin	Won	
Buil Film Awards	Best New Actress	Seo Woo	Won	

== Release ==
Crush and Blush made its world premiere at the 13th Pusan International Film Festival, which ran from October 2–10, 2008. After its theatrical release on October 16, 2008, it attracted 532,323 admissions, and grossed a total of US$2,628,300.
