= Lee Chun-hee =

South Korean actor (born 1979)

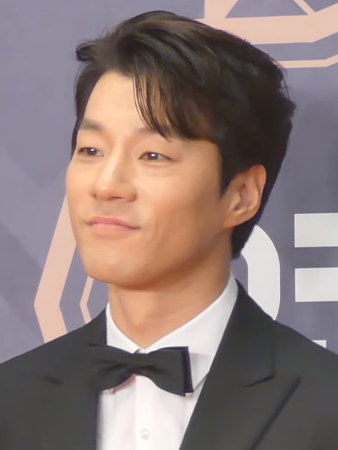
- Lee in December 2018
- Born: February 19, 1979 (age 47); Seoul, South Korea
- Education: Seoul Institute of the Arts – Theater
- Occupation: Actor
- Years active: 2003–present
- Agent: Management SOOP
- Spouse: Jeon Hye-jin (m. 2011)
- Children: 1

Korean name
- Hangul: 이천희
- Hanja: 李天熙
- RR: I Cheonhui
- MR: I Ch'ŏnhŭi

Former name
- Hangul: 이광택
- RR: I Gwangtaek
- MR: I Kwangt'aek

Lee Chun-hee (born February 19, 1979) is a South Korean actor.

== Career ==
Lee Chun-hee made his acting debut in the movie A Good Lawyer's Wife in 2003 and has since starred in several big screen roles such as The Aggressives (2005), Three Fellas (also known as Bar Legend, 2006), Humming (2008), Beautiful (2008), Barbie (2012), and Collective Invention (2015). He has also appeared on the small screen, notably in Conspiracy in the Court (2007), Smile, You (2010), Gloria (2010), Take Care of Us, Captain (2012), the sitcom One Thousandth Man (2012), and Dating Agency: Cyrano (2013).

Lee earned the nickname "Chunderella" from his stint on variety show Family Outing, because the other cast members picked on him for being awkward and clumsy, particularly Kim Soo-ro (nicknamed "Stepmother Kim"). He later shed that image on variety show Adrenaline, when his expertise with camping equipment led him to being called "ChunGyver."

== Personal life ==
=== Marriage and family ===
Lee married Smile, You co-star Jeon Hye-jin on March 11, 2011. Their daughter, Lee So-yu, was born on July 30, 2011.

=== Business venture ===
He has operated a furniture brand called Highbrow in Wonju since 2013.

== Filmography ==
=== Film ===
Year	Title	Role	Notes/Ref.
2003	A Good Lawyer's Wife	Kim Yeon's new lover	
2004	Ice Rain	Choi Byung-hoon	
2004	Too Beautiful to Lie	Young-deok	
2004	Temptation of Wolves	Yoo-won	
2005	The Aggressives	Gap-ba	
2006	3 Colors Love Story		segment: "I Can Hear the Memory"
2006	Three Fellas	Ki Sung-hyun	
2008	Beautiful	Eun-cheol	
2008	Humming	Joon-seo	
2009	A Million	Choi Wook-hwan	
2011	My Black Mini Dress	Soo-hwan (cameo)	
2012	Barbie	Lee Mang-taek	
2012	National Security	Section chief Kim	
2014	How to Steal a Dog	Soo-young	
2015	Collective Invention	Sang-won	
2018	Déjà vu	Cha In-tae	
2018	Door Lock		
2022	Ordinary Courage	Himself	Environmental documentary film

=== Television series ===
Year	Title	Role	Notes
2005	MBC Best Theater "Navigator of My Life"	Hyun-soo	
2005	Only You	Jung Hyun-sung	
2005	Drama City "Summer, Goodbye"	Sung-yup	
2005	Autumn Shower	Kim Soo-hyung	
2007	Conspiracy in the Court	Yang Man-oh	
2008	The Great King, Sejong	Jang Yeong-sil	
2008	On Air	Himself	Cameo (Episode 3)
2009	Smile, You	Seo Sung-joon	
2010	Road No. 1	Soldier in the Youngchongyo bombing	Cameo (Episode 19)
2010	Gloria	Ha Dong-ah	
2011	KBS Drama Special "Linger"	Ha In-sung	
2012	Take Care of Us, Captain	Kang Dong-soo	
2012	KBS Drama Special "Do I Look Like a Pushover?"	Han Dong-kyu	
2012	One Thousandth Man	Kim Eung-seok	
2012	KBS Drama Special "Like a Miracle"	Noh Sang-pil	
2013	KBS Drama Special "Like a Fairytale"	Kim Myung-je	
2013	Dating Agency: Cyrano	Cha Seung-pyo	
2013	Master's Sun	Yoo Jin-woo	Cameo (Episode 14–17)
2015	The Producers	Lee Min-chul	Cameo (Episode 3)
2015	Hello Monster	Kang Eun-hyuk	
2018	A Pledge to God	Song Min-ho	
2021	Law School	Park Geun-tae	
2023	Pale Moon	Seong Si-hun	

=== Variety shows ===
Year	Title	Notes	Ref.
2008-2009	Family Outing	Cast member	
2012	Adrenaline	Cast member, season 1	
2014-2015	Super Company: The Next K-Design	Host	
2014	Law of the City in New York	Cast member	
2021	Public Land	Cast Member with Jeon Hye-jin and Gong Hyo-jin	

=== Music video appearances ===
Year	Song title	Artist
2003	"I Like You"	Jewelry
2004	"An Ordinary Day"	g.o.d
2007	"A Scarecrow"	Kim Gun-mo
2008	"Youth Day"	V.O.S
2008	"Like Love"	Baek Ji-young
2008	"Like the First Time"	SG Wannabe
2008	"Everyday, Everyday"	V.O.S feat. Baby J (Jewelry)
2009	"I Miss and Miss and Miss You"	K.Will

== Discography ==
=== Singles ===
Title	Year	Album
"Love You Forever"	2008	Humming OST
"Family Day"	2009	Family Outing single
"Ordinary Brave" (보통의 용기) (with Jeon Hye-jin and Gong Hyo-jin)	2022	Ordinary Courage OST

== Awards and nominations ==
Year	Award	Category	Nominated work	Result
2008	SBS Entertainment Awards	Netizen Popularity Award	Family Outing	Won
2008	KBS Drama Awards	Best New Actor	The Great King, Sejong	Nominated
2009	SBS Drama Awards	Best Supporting Actor in a Special Planning Drama	Smile, You	Nominated
2010	MBC Drama Awards	Excellence Award, Actor	Gloria	Nominated
2012	SBS Drama Awards	Excellence Award, Actor in a Drama Special	Take Care of Us, Captain	Nominated
2018	MBC Drama Awards	Excellence Award, Actor in a Weekend Special Project	A Pledge to God	Nominated
