= Missing (2016 film) =

- Theatrical release poster
- Directed by: Lee Eon-hee
- Written by: Hong Eun-mi
- Produced by: Baek Hyun-ik; Kim Sung-woo
- Starring: Uhm Ji-won; Gong Hyo-jin
- Cinematography: Kim Sung-an
- Music by: Kang Min-kook
- Production company: Dice Film
- Distributed by: Megabox Plus M
- Release date: November 30, 2016
- Running time: 100 minutes
- Country: South Korea
- Languages: Korean; Mandarin
- Box office: US$7.8 million

Missing (Korean: 미씽: 사라진 여자; RR: Missing: sarajin yeoja; lit. 'Missing: Missing Woman') is 2016 South Korean mystery film starring Uhm Ji-won and Gong Hyo-jin. It was released on November 30, 2016.

== Plot ==
Divorced Ji-sun struggles to juggle work, her 1-year-old daughter Da-eun, and the custody battle with her ex-husband Jang Jin-hyuk. After firing her old Chinese nanny for causing her child to be injured, she hired Han-Mae, a young Chinese woman who is the niece of her neighbour's nanny.

Some time later, Ji-sun misses an appointment to a court hearing. It turns out Han-Mae had received the notice but failed to inform her. At court, the judge rules against her, citing her workaholic nature and mental instability due to work and her divorce. Her lawyer advises her to beg to her husband to let her keep her daughter.

Arriving at home, Ji-sun finds the chores undone and Han-Mae and Da-eun, who supposedly went to the clinic for Da-eun's vaccination, are not home. Her calls to Han-Mae go unanswered. After a fruitless search around the neighbourhood and even Chinatown, an exhausted Ji-sun falls asleep at home.

The next morning, avoiding her mother-in-law, who has come to get Da-eun, Ji-sun heads to the clinic. She learns Han-Mae came in 2 days ago and acquired a month's worth of flu medicines, something that mothers do before going on a trip with their babies. The neighbour's nanny calls Ji-sun and reveals Han-Mae was a stranger and paid her to be introduced as her niece. Her lawyer calls her and warns her of the consequences of faking a kidnapping.

A man lurking around her flat (later identified as Park Hyeon-ik) tells Ji-sun that Han-Mae owes him money. After learning she had vanished, he takes Ji-sun to a prostitution bar in China-town, where Han-Mae used to work. The sympathetic owner promises to call if she has news of Han-Mae. Leaving the bar, Ji-sun gets a call from a man claiming to have her daughter hostage. Ji-sun frantically transfers all the money in her account to the supposed kidnapper. Instructed to go to Yeouido Wharf, she finds a bag of Da-eun's toys. The police arrive there shortly, having been called by Ji-sun.

Ji-sun finally lodges a missing person's report at the police station. When asked to provide their photos, Ji-sun cannot find a single photo of Han-Mae. Her mother-in-law bursts into the police station and accusing Ji-sun of hiding Da-eun. Detective Park calls Ji-sun's lawyer and learns of her detention. He sums up Ji-sun's problems, including Han-Mae's unknown personal details, forged Foreigner ID, and her number was from a burner phone.

Ji-sun slips out of the police station and goes back to her apartment building. As she reviews the security footage, the security guard brings in a high-schooler. He witnessed Han-Mae engineered the incident that injured Da-eun, leading to the old nanny to be fired. Ji-sun goes back to the bar and searches through Han-Mae belongings, finding a baby photo taken at 'Mihwa Studio'.

Flashback reveals Han-Mae was employed at the bar with the name 목련 (Mok-ryeon - Magnolia). Hyeon-ik, her first customer, fell in love with her at first sight. During one of their sessions, she had asked him about local anesthesia and had told him that she wanted to give her liver to someone. She went somewhere every day at 2pm and stayed out for 2–3 hours at a time.

Ignoring calls from the detective and her husband, Ji-Sun finds the studio. She asks the owner and sees other photos confirming Han-Mae was the child's mother. He recorded the father's name as Han Suk-ho and the mother's name as Kim Yeon, and an address in Chungcheong.

Ji-sun visits the address, finding an empty house. A neighbor strikes up a conversation, revealing Han-Mae was abused by Suk-ho and his mother for not speaking Korean and not able to bear a child. The situation improved after she had a daughter, Jae-in. However, one day Jae-in got sick and was hospitalized. Her in-laws, unwilling to spend much on a girl, abandoned Han-Mae and Jae-in. That was the last time the neighbour saw her.

The police, having followed the same chain of clues, arrives at the house, detains Ji-sun and takes her back to the police station. Ji-sun pieces together the clues and deducted Jae-in was treated at Gangnam Catholic Hospital - her husband's workplace. The detectives learn that Jae-in suffered from Congenital Biliary Atresia and needed a liver transplant. They speculate that she abducted Da-eun to steal her liver, aided by Hyeon-ik, an infamous organ trafficker.

Suk-ho's mother reports her son missing. A man fitting his description is found burned to dead inside his car, seemingly caused by an accident. Ji-Sun is disturbed to learn the accident must have taken back a week ago. She recalls Han-Mae returning home late, her face a nervous mess and, when Ji-sun walked in on her undressing, her back had scars from abuse.

Ji-sun goes to the hospital with the detectives and learns that Han-Mae was known there as 'The Singing Chinese Woman'. In a flashback, with Hyeon-ik help, Han-Mae sold her organs, but they money did not come fast enough and Jae-in was forcibly discharged. Bleeding from the wounds, she begged the doctors, accidentally snatching an ID card belonging to Ji-sun's husband. She glared the new occupant that occupied her daughter's bed, who turned out to be Da-eun.

Ji-sun goes home to a crowd of investigators, who now investigate from a new angle. In a flashback, Da-eun was hospitalized for acute pneumonia. Her father, Ji-sun's husband, pulled some strings to get her a bed and out of the ER. This resulted in Han Jae-in being discharged, kicking off the whole plot.

Ji-sun finds a handmade patchwork quilt with the name 'Jae-in' embroidered at the back. She searches the kimchi fridge and comes across a cooler at the bottom. Opening the cooler, she collapses in shock to find Jae-in's frozen corpse. The little girl had died in her mother's arms shortly after being discharged.

Park Hyeon-ik is taken into questioning, but refuses to disclose anything about Han-Mae. However, he wavers when Ji-Sun begs him to return Da-eun to her. He reveals the money was given to Suk-ho, without whose consent Jae-in couldn't be treated. Suk-ho brought the money to the hospital, but he arrived only to find Han-Mae sitting outside with Jae-in in her arms, anger burning in her eyes. She cut off contact with Hyeon-ik until a month ago, when she asked him to kill Suk-ho, offering Da-eun as payment. However, Han-Mae ran off with Da-Eun instead. Hyeon-ik also reveals Han-Mae had a passport made for her Jae-in, planning to go back to China. It is likely now she will flee with Da-eun.

Rushing to the international port, Ji-sun gets on the China bound ship leaving the earliest. By sheer luck she spots Han-Mae and a chase ensues, resulting in the two women facing off on the hull. Seeing herself surrounded by the police, she threatens to jump off with Dae-eun, whom she thinks is Jae-in. Ji-sun offers her patchwork quilt she had made for Jae-in. She apologizes for the hospital incident, offering to kill herself in exchange for Dae-un's life. Han-mae breaks out of her delusion, realizes she is not holding Jae-in, and hands Da-eun back to Detective Park. She proceeds to jump off the ship, and Ji-sun jumps after her. Ji-sun catches Han-Mae, who pulls away and drown clutching the quilt. Han-Mae relives the memory of the time she was pregnant, when she promised to make Jae-in the happiest baby in the world.

Ji-sun wakes up in her hospital bed. The nurse brings her to the playground where Da-eun plays with other kids. Ji-sun calls out to her. After a while, Dae-un toddles into her open arms and calls her "Mama". Ji-sun cries in relief.

== Cast ==
- Uhm Ji-won as Lee Ji-sun
- Gong Hyo-jin as Han Mae / Kim Yeon
- Kim Hee-won as Park Sung-ho
- Park Hae-joon as Park Hyun-ik
- Seo Ha-nui as Jang Da-eun
- Kim Ga-ryul as Han Jae-in / Jane
- Jun Suk-chan as Detective Nam
- Lee Sung-wook as Detective Seo
- Jo Dal-hwan as Lawyer Min
- Go Jun as Jang Jin-hyuk
- Jang Won-young as Han Suk-ho
- Kim Jin-goo as Suk-ho's mother
- Kim Ji-hoon as Kim Yi-jang
- Ramirez Cherrish as Suzan
- Ham Sung-min as Boy in school uniform
- Gil Hae-yeon as Ji-sun's mother-in-Law
- Kim Sun-young as Bar owner
- Seo Eun-ah as Soo-ryun

== Reception ==
The film was released on November 30, 2016. It reached more than one million admissions in less than two weeks, and at the end of its run, the film had a total of 1,153,109 admissions nationwide with a gross of US$7.8 million.

== Release ==
The film's rights were sold to numerous Asian countries including Japan, Singapore, Brunei, Cambodia, Indonesia, Laos, Malaysia, Myanmar, Nepal, Philippines, Vietnam, Thailand and Sri Lanka.

A Chinese remake titled Lost, Found was released in 2018.

== Awards and nominations ==
Year	Award	Category	Recipient	Result	Ref.
2016	Korea Film Actor's Association Awards	Top Star Award	Gong Hyo-jin	Won	
2017	22nd Chunsa Film Art Awards	Best Actress	Gong Hyo-jin	Nominated	
2017	37th Golden Cinema Film Festival	Best Actress	Gong Hyo-jin	Won	
2017	26th Buil Film Awards	Best Actress	Gong Hyo-jin	Nominated	
2017	26th Buil Film Awards	Best Screenplay	Eunmi Hong	Nominated	
2017	54th Grand Bell Awards	Best Actress	Gong Hyo-jin	Nominated	
2017	54th Grand Bell Awards	Best Screenplay	Eunmi Hong	Nominated	
2017	37th Korean Association of Film Critics Awards	Top 10 Films	Missing	Won	
2017	38th Blue Dragon Film Awards	Best Actress	Gong Hyo-jin	Nominated	
2017	18th Women in Film Korea Awards	Best Actress	Uhm Ji-won	Won	
