= The Producers (TV series) =

2015 South Korean television series

- Promotional poster
- Hangul: 프로듀사
- Lit.: Producer
- RR: Peurodyusa
- MR: P'ŭrodyusa
- Genre: Comedy-drama
- Written by: Park Ji-eun; Kim Ji-sun
- Directed by: Seo Soo-min; Pyo Min-soo
- Starring: Cha Tae-hyun; Gong Hyo-jin; Kim Soo-hyun; Lee Ji-eun
- Composer: Kim Han-jo
- Country of origin: South Korea
- Original language: Korean
- No. of seasons: 1
- No. of episodes: 12 (+1 special)

Production
- Executive producer: Park Jong-min
- Cinematography: Ji Jae-woo; Park Ki-hyun
- Editor: Kim Young-joo
- Running time: 80 minutes
- Production companies: Chorokbaem Media; Producers SPC; KBS Media

Original release
- Network: KBS2
- Release: May 15 – June 20, 2015

The Producers (Korean: 프로듀사) is a 2015 South Korean comedy-drama television series written by Park Ji-eun, and directed by Seo Soo-min and Pyo Min-soo. It stars Cha Tae-hyun, Gong Hyo-jin, Kim Soo-hyun, and Lee Ji-eun. It aired on KBS2 from May 15 to June 20, 2015 every Friday and Saturday at 21:15 (KST) for 12 episodes.

== Synopsis ==
In the center of Yeouido is the KBS building. On its sixth floor are partitioned offices where employees work in the network's variety department, keeping hectic schedules of filming, editing and all-night meetings.

== Cast ==
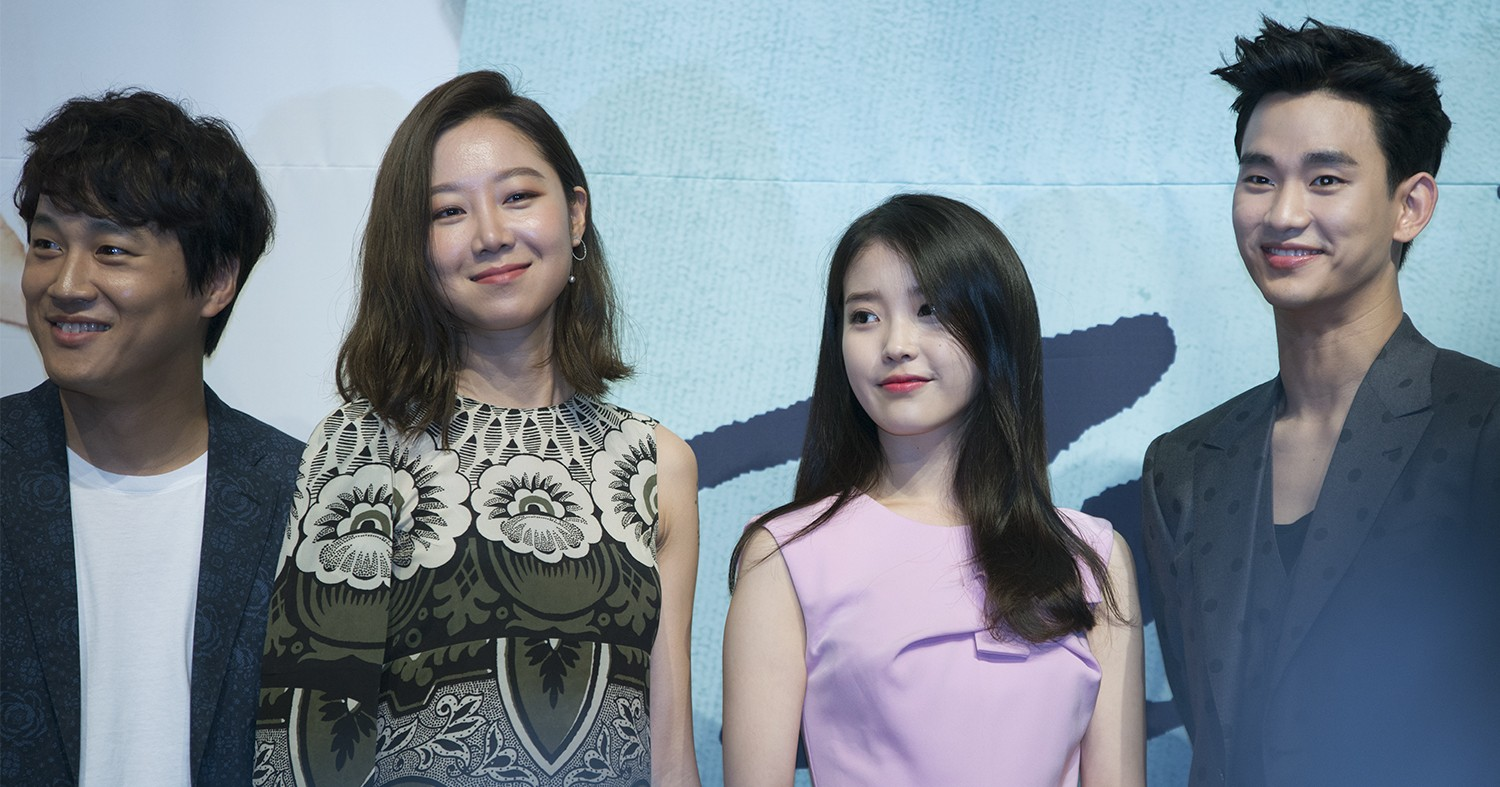
The cast of The Producers photographed at the press conference, May 2015

=== Main ===
- Cha Tae-hyun as Ra Joon-mo
  - Gil Jeong-woo as young Joon-mo
  - Chae Sang-woo as teenage Joon-mo

A seasoned PD who has worked in the industry for ten years. Despite working on a lot of variety programs, he has no single masterpiece to call his own. A two-faced senior.

- Gong Hyo-jin as Tak Ye-jin
  - Lee Ji-won as young Ye-jin
  - Ha Seung-ri as teenage Ye-jin

An experienced PD who works on a long-time music program. She is smart, haughty and never holds back in letting people know what she thinks. She uses her high position to abuse newbies.

- Kim Soo-hyun as Baek Seung-chan
  - Park Sang-hoon as young Seung-chan

An aspiring prosecutor who decides to join KBS because of his secret crush on a KBS employee. He becomes a rookie PD (producer-director) with the variety/entertainment division joins with Ra Joon-mo's team. As series progresses his interactions with cindy will turn into a relationship where possibilities of romantic relationship may be in store.

- Lee Ji-eun as Cindy
  - Park Seon as young Cindy

A famous singer and celebrity who debuted as a trainee when she was 13 years old. She is called the "ice princess" for her poker face and complete control over her emotions. As the drama progresses we see hints of the fragile Cindy especially when interacting with Baek Seung-chan which she has kept hidden for all these years and eventually develops a romantic interest towards Baek Seung-chan.

=== Supporting ===
KBS

- Park Hyuk-kwon as Kim Tae-ho, chief producer of the variety department.
- Kim Jong-kook as Kim Hong-soon, PD of Open Concert
- Seo Ki-chul as Jang In-pyo, director of the variety department.
- Ye Ji-won as Go Yang-mi, office manager of the variety department.
- Gi Ju-bong as Park Choon-bong, the president of KBS.
- Lee Joo-seung as Kim Joon-bae, floor director of 2 Days & 1 Night. Turns out to be a legendary ghost of KBS.
- Lee Chae-eun as Son Ji-yeon, writer of 2 Days & 1 Night.
- Go Bo-gyeol as Wang Min-jung, youngest writer of 2 Days & 1 Night.
- Bae Yoo-ram as Ryu Il-yong, assistant director of 2 Days & 1 Night.
- Shin Joo-hwan as Hyung-geun, assistant director of 2 Days & 1 Night.
- Susanna Noh as casting writer of 2 Days & 1 Night.
- Kim Sun-ah as Kim Da-jung, youngest writer of Music Bank.
- Jang Seong-beom as assistant PD of Music Bank.

Byun Entertainment agency

- Na Young-hee as Byun Mi-sook, CEO of the agency
- Choi Kwon as Cindy's road manager
- Jo Han-chul as Secretary Kim
- Janey as Jini, a trainee of the agency
- Na Hae-ryung as Yuna, ex-singer of the agency
- Cho Seung-hee as Yu-ju, member of Pinky4
- Kim Soo-yeon as Christine, member of Pinky4
- Jung Mi-mi as Ha-neul, member of Pinky4
- Park Seo-yeon, young trainee
- Lee Ji-ho as young trainee
- Kim Ye-won as young trainee
- Lee Seo-yeong as young trainee

Baek's Family

- Kim Jong-soo as Baek Bo-sun, Seung-chan's father
- Kim Hye-ok as Lee Hoo-nam, Seung-chan's mother
- Park Hee-von as Baek Jae-hee, Seung-chan's older sister
- Park Jong-hwan as Baek Young-chan, Seung-chan's older brother
- Choi Sun-young as Baek Yoo-bin, Seung-chan's younger sister
- Kang Shin-chul as Myung Ji-hoon, Jae-hee's husband

Extended

- Im Ye-jin as Park Bong-soon, Joon-mo's mother
- Kim Hee-chan as Tak Ye-joon, Ye-jin's younger brother
- Jung Han-hee as Kim Tae-ho's daughter
- Yoon Yoo-sun as Kim Tae-ho's wife
- Kim Sa-kwon
- Lee Du-seok
- Jo Chang-geun
- Jin Yong-wook
- Jeon Heon-tae
- Hwang Min-ho
- Ahn Se-ha as manager
- Lee Jeong-ho as Reporter Kang
- Ryu Jun-yeol as Joo Jong-hyun

=== Special appearances ===
Episode 1

- Girls' Generation-TTS

Episodes 1–2 (cast members of 2 Days & 1 Night - Season 4)

- Youn Yuh-jung
- Hwang Shin-hye
- Geum Bo-ra
- Hyun Young

Episodes 1–4

- Jo Yoon-hee as Shin Hae-joo, assistant director on Entertainment Weekly and Seung-chan's crush.

Episode 3

- Shin Dong-yup
- Lee Young-ja
- Cultwo
- You Hee-yeol
- Yoon Jong-shin
- Jo Jung-chi
- Jun Hyun-moo
- Ahn Hee-yeon
- Nichkhun
- Jackson Wang
- Jo Kwon
- Sunmi
- Hong Kyung-min
- Jang Hyuk as Jang Hyun-sung, Ye-jin's ex-boyfriend
- Lee Chun-hee as Lee Min-chul, Ye-jin's ex-boyfriend

Episodes 3–4

- Park Jin-young

Episodes 4–5, 12 (cast members of 2 Days & 1 Night – Season 5)

- Sandara Park
- Minwoo
- Kim Ji-soo

Episodes 4–5, 10, 12 (cast members of 2 Days & 1 Night – Season 5)

- Kang Seung-yoon
- Kim Min-jae

Episode 5

- Yoo Ho-jin as PD of 2 Days & 1 Night – Season 3

Episode 6

- Lee Seung-gi
- Norazo

Episode 8

- Go Ara

Episode 9

- K.Will
- Park Bo-gum
- Monsta X
- Kim Ryeo-wook

Episode 10

- Jung Joon-young as Cindy's anti-fan
- Roy Kim as Cindy's anti-fan
- Seol In-ah as Cindy's anti-fan
- Seo Kyung-seok as Cindy's lawyer fan

Episode 12

- Song Hae
- Kim Saeng-min

== Production ==
The Producers was dubbed as "the most anticipated show" of 2015 because it served reunion between the actor Kim Soo-hyun and the screenwriter Park Ji-eun after the pan-Asia successful television series My Love from the Star (2013–14). The series was produced by KBS's entertainment department instead of the drama department and was helmed by director Seo Soo-min, whose past experience has been on variety shows. It was also the first terrestrial network drama to air in the Friday–Saturday time slot.

First script reading was held on 23 March 2015 in Gangnam District, Seoul, with no media presence. The first day shooting was held on April 1, 2015 on the 6th floor of the KBS building in Yeouido. Official posters for the drama were unveiled on 29 April 2015.

== Original soundtrack ==
The Producers

Soundtrack album by Various artists
- Released: 23 May 2015
- Languages: Korean; English
- Labels: Danal Entertainment; ROY Entertainment

No.	Title	Artist	Length
1.	"Love Begins With a Confession" (타이틀 사랑의 시작은 고백에서부터)	Kim Bum-soo	3:44
2.	"And... And" (And...그리고)	Baek Ji-young	4:06
3.	"To Be With You"	Kim Yeon-woo	3:43
4.	"Darling (OST Version)" (달링 (OST Version))	Lee Seung-chul	3:00
5.	"The Two of Us" (우리돌)	Ali	3:22
6.	"Palpitations" (두근두근)	Ben	3:22
7.	"Soul Mate" (소울메이트)	Kihyun	3:51
8.	"If You Really Love Me" (정말로 사랑 했다면)	Hael	3:47
9.	"Spring Snow (OST Version)" (봅는 (OST Version))	Lucid Fall	3:28
10.	"TV Show (OST Version)"	Zitten	3:00
11.	"ZigZag Step" (지그재그 스템)	Jang Jiwon	2:19
12.	"Could we?"	Various Artists	1:49
13.	"Way to Work"	Various Artists	2:08
14.	"Reunion"	Various Artists	2:25

The Producers (Special Edition)

Soundtrack album by Various artists
- Released: 19 June 2015
- Languages: Korean; English
- Labels: Sony Music; ROY Entertainment

CD 1
No.	Title	Artist	Length
1.	"You and I" (너와 나)	Taru	3:15
2.	"Love Begins With a Confession (OST Version)" (사랑의 시작은 고백에서부터)	Soulcry	3:41
3.	"I Like you" (나는 너 좋아)	Kihyun	3:18
4.	"Because of You" (너 땜에)	Jung Kyul	3:40
5.	"Palpitations" (두근두근)	Ben	3:22
6.	"And... And" (And...그리고)	Baek Ji-young	4:06
7.	"To Be With You"	Kim Yeon-woo	3:43
8.	"Love Begins With a Confession" (사랑의 시작은 고백에서부터)	Kim Bum-soo	3:44
9.	"The Two of Us" (우리 둘)	Ali	3:22
10.	"Love Sweet" (러브스윗)	Heyne	2:51
11.	"If You Really Love Me" (정말로 사랑 했다면)	Kihyun	3:51
12.	"Darling (OST Version)" (달링)	Lee Seung-chul	3:00

CD 2
No.	Title	Artist	Length
1.	"When Spring Comes" (봄이 되면)	Kim Jae-hyun; Choi Il-ho	1:59
2.	"Like Star Coffee"	Kang Mi-yeon	1:32
3.	"Lolly"	Kim Jae-young	0:53
4.	"You're mine"	Choi Seong-ho	1:13
5.	"Truly"	Various Artists	1:45
6.	"Way to Work (Piano Version)"	Park Seung-joo	2:07
7.	"After a Long Time"	Park Dong-il	2:24
8.	"Love is Love" (사랑은 바로 Love)	Kim Kyeong-mo	2:14
9.	"One Fine Day"	Baek In-wo	2:43
10.	"Your Love"	Choi Ga-ram	2:29
11.	"Fishbowl"	Various Artists	1:45
12.	"And... And (Inst.)" (And... 그리고 (Inst.))	Kim Eui-seok	4:06
13.	"The Two of Us (Inst.)" (우리 둘 (Inst.))	Choi Hee-jun	3:22
14.	"Palpitations (Inst.)" (두근두근 (Inst.))	4planet	3:22
15.	"Love Begins With a Confession (Inst.)" (사랑의 시작은 고백에서부터 (Inst.))	Yang Jeong-seong	3:44
16.	"To be with You (BG)"	Kim Eui-seok	2:02

DVD^{[a]}
No.	Title	Length
1.	"To Be With You [M/V]"
2.	"Love Begins With a Confession [M/V]"
3.	"And...And [M/V]"
4.	"Soulmate [M/V]"

CD 1 Special Tracks^{[a]}
No.	Title	Artist	Length
1.	"Love Sweet" (러브스윗)	Heo Sol-ji	2:51
2.	"Heart" (마음)	IU	2:48

Notes

- ^{^{^[a]}} Included in the special edition physical album only.

=== Chart performance ===
List of singles, with selected chart positions, showing year released and sales
Title	Year	Peak chart positions	Sales (Note: Korean sales are paid digital downloads weekly, monthly and annually provided by the Gaon Music Chart.)	Remarks
Title	Year	KOR Gaon	Sales	Remarks
"Heart" (IU)	2015	1	KOR: 2,500,000 (Note: Sales figures for "Heart" as of February 2019.)	OST Special Edition
"Darling (OST Version)" (Lee Seung-chul)	2015	80	KOR: 21,893 (Note: Sales figure for "Darling (OST Ver.) OST _ Preview 01" and "To Be With You OST _ Preview 02" as of May 23, 2015.)	OST _ Preview 01
"To Be With You" (Kim Yeon-woo)	2015	51	KOR: 37,421	OST _ Preview 02
"To Be With You" (Kim Yeon-woo)	2015	73	KOR: 109,090 (Note: Sales figure for "To Be With You" as of July 4, 2015.)	—N/a
"And... And" (Baek Ji-young)	2015	39	KOR: 81,675 (Note: Sales figure for "And... And OST _ Preview 03" as of June 6, 2015.)	OST _ Preview 03
"And... And" (Baek Ji-young)	2015	63	KOR: 108,147 (Note: Sales figure for "And... And" as of July 4, 2015.)	—N/a
"Love Begins With a Confession" (Kim Bum-soo)	2015	11	KOR: 657,531 (Note: Sales figure for "Love Begins With a Confession" as of December 2015.)	—N/a
"Palpitations" (Ben)	2015	29	KOR: 208,347 (Note: Sales figure for "Palpitations" as of July 11, 2015.)	—N/a
"The Two of Us" (Ali)	2015	93	KOR: 69,317 (Note: Sales figure for "The Two of Us" as of June 20, 2015.)	—N/a
"You and I" (Taru)	2015	66	KOR: 27,831 (Note: Sales figure for "You and I" as of June 27, 2015.)	OST Special Edition

== Reception ==
=== Commercial performance ===
Yonhap News Agency reported The Producers would earn ₩8.4 billion according to the broadcaster and industry sources. It reportedly earned ₩2 billion alone from product placement and other sponsored advertisements which was above the average amount for a 16-episode series of about ₩1–1.5 billion at that time. Also, it was sold to 12 Asian countries at high prices. However, KBS officials said that it would log lower-than-expected profits due to rise in initial production cost stating various reasons including the change of producer in the middle of the series.

=== Critical response ===
The Producers received mixed critical response. Kwon Ji-youn writing for The Korea Times called the premier of drama "great boast and small roast" reasoning that despite having "an all-star cast, impressive cameos and an original setting and plot" the drama was "nothing out of the ordinary." She praised Kim Soo-hyun's acting calling the transformation from his former character on My Love from the Star "striking" and he and Gong Hyo-jin were only able to pull off humour scenes. It also received criticism from entertainment industry insiders regarding its verisimilitude, particularly in the drama's depiction of producers as the weaker party in dealing with celebrities, which they claimed is "highly unrealistic" unless top stars are involved.

=== Viewership ===
The Producers drew an average viewership rating of 12.5% and topped the Content Power Index (CPI) rankings.

In the table below, the blue numbers represent the lowest ratings and the red numbers represent the highest ratings.

Viewership ratings per episode of The Producers in South Korea
Ep.	Original broadcast date	Title	Average audience share			
Ep.	Original broadcast date	Title	Nielsen Korea		TNmS	
Ep.	Original broadcast date	Title	Nationwide	Seoul	Nationwide	Seoul
1	May 15, 2015	The Variety Department, Unintentionally	10.1% (11th)	10.5% (9th)	10.5% (10th)	11.8% (8th)
2	May 16, 2015	News of Quitting, Unintentionally	10.3% (6th)	10.7% (5th)	11.2% (4th)	12.3% (5th)
3	May 22, 2015	Pheasant Instead of Chicken, Unintentionally	10.2% (10th)	11.4% (6th)	9.6% (15th)	10.8% (10th)
4	May 23, 2015	Acting That Way, Unintentionally	11.0% (5th)	11.3% (5th)	13.5% (5th)	13.3% (5th)
5	May 29, 2015	Understanding Editing	11.2% (8th)	12.0% (6th)	10.8% (10th)	12.3% (8th)
6	May 30, 2015	Understanding Broadcasting Accidents	13.5% (3rd)	14.5% (3rd)	12.8% (4th)	14.4% (5th)
7	June 5, 2015	Understanding How to Play the Media	11.7% (7th)	12.3% (6th)	11.8% (9th)	13.4% (5th)
8	June 6, 2015	Understanding Love Lines	13.4% (3rd)	13.7% (3rd)	13.8% (3rd)	16.7% (4th)
9	June 12, 2015	Understanding Cancelled Broadcasts	12.6% (3rd)	13.5% (3rd)	11.7% (10th)	13.3% (3rd)
10	June 13, 2015	Understanding Previews	14.6% (3rd)	15.4% (3rd)	13.8% (3rd)	15.6% (4th)
11	June 19, 2015	Understanding Ratings	13.4% (3rd)	14.5% (3rd)	13.3% (4th)	15.3% (3rd)
12	June 20, 2015	Understanding a long-running program	17.7% (2nd)	17.9% (3rd)	18.2% (2nd)	20.4% (2nd)
Average			12.5%	13.1%	12.4%	14.1%
Special	June 26, 2015	Understanding NGs	5.5%	7.5%	7.9%	7.9%

== Awards and nominations ==
Awards for The Producers
Year	Award ceremony	Award	Nominee(s)	Result	Ref.
2015	8th Korea Drama Awards	Grand Prize (Daesang)	Kim Soo-hyun	Won	
2015	8th Korea Drama Awards	Best Drama	The Producers	Nominated	
2015	8th Korea Drama Awards	Best Production Director	Seo Soo-min, Pyo Min-soo	Won	
2015	8th Korea Drama Awards	Excellence Award, Actress	IU	Nominated	
2015	8th Korea Drama Awards	Hallyu Star Award	Kim Soo-hyun	Won	
2015	4th APAN Star Awards	Grand Prize (Daesang)	Kim Soo-hyun	Won	
2015	4th APAN Star Awards	Top Excellence Award, Actor in a Miniseries	Kim Soo-hyun	Nominated	
2015	4th APAN Star Awards	Top Excellence Award, Actress in a Miniseries	Gong Hyo-jin	Nominated	
2015	4th APAN Star Awards	Excellence Award, Actress in a Miniseries	IU	Nominated	
2015	29th KBS Drama Awards	Grand Prize (Daesang)	Kim Soo-hyun	Won	
2015	29th KBS Drama Awards	Top Excellence Award, Actor	Kim Soo-hyun	Nominated	
2015	29th KBS Drama Awards	Top Excellence Award, Actress	Gong Hyo-jin	Nominated	
2015	29th KBS Drama Awards	Excellence Award, Actor in a Miniseries	Cha Tae-hyun	Won	
2015	29th KBS Drama Awards	Excellence Award, Actor in a Miniseries	Kim Soo-hyun	Nominated	
2015	29th KBS Drama Awards	Excellence Award, Actress in a Miniseries	Gong Hyo-jin	Nominated	
2015	29th KBS Drama Awards	Excellence Award, Actress in a Miniseries	IU	Nominated	
2015	29th KBS Drama Awards	Netizen Award, Actor	Kim Soo-hyun	Won	
2015	29th KBS Drama Awards	Popularity Award, Actor	Kim Soo-hyun	Nominated	
2015	29th KBS Drama Awards	Popularity Award, Actress	Gong Hyo-jin	Nominated	
2015	29th KBS Drama Awards	Popularity Award, Actress	IU	Nominated	
2015	29th KBS Drama Awards	Best Couple	Kim Soo-hyun, Cha Tae-hyun and Gong Hyo-jin	Won	
2015	29th KBS Drama Awards	Best Couple	Cha Tae-hyun and Gong Hyo-jin	Nominated	
2015	29th KBS Drama Awards	Best Couple	Kim Soo-hyun and Gong Hyo-jin	Nominated	
2015	29th KBS Drama Awards	Best Couple	Kim Soo-hyun and IU	Nominated	
