= Heaven's Soldiers =

- Theatrical poster
- Directed by: Min Joon-ki
- Written by: Min Joon-ki
- Produced by: Cha Seung-jae
- Starring: Park Joong-hoon; Kim Seung-woo; Hwang Jung-min; Gong Hyo-jin
- Cinematography: Park Jae-hyung
- Edited by: Park Gok-ji
- Music by: Hwang Sang-jun
- Distributed by: Showbox
- Release date: 15 July 2005 (South Korea)
- Running time: 106 minutes
- Country: South Korea
- Language: Korean
- Budget: US$7−8 million

Heaven's Soldiers (Korean: 천군; Hanja: 天軍; RR: Cheongun) is a 2005 South Korean period action comedy film directed by Min Joon-ki. It combines elements of several genres such as war films, time travel and historical drama.

== Plot ==
The film begins with high-level military leaders from both North and South Korea discussing the surrender of a North Korean 50 Mt nuclear warhead (비격진천뢰; Bigyeokjincheolloe) in a secret underground development bunker near the DMZ. The warhead was secretly jointly-designed, but international pressure has forced North and South Korea to hand over the device and close the facility. North Korean officer Major Kang Min-gil (Kim Seung-woo), displeased with the conciliation of the Koreas, steals the warhead with the help of several of his loyal soldiers. The leaders of both sides dispatch a South Korean Naval Special Forces platoon under the leadership of Major Park Jung-woo (Hwang Jung-min).

The platoon intercepts the rebellious Kang and his squad by boat and begin a firefight. However, in the middle of the conflict, a comet travels dangerously close to Earth, triggering a "time rift" linking the present with other points in the comet's 433-year cycle of close approaches to the Earth. Three modern Korean men from each side (and one female scientist, Dr. Kim Su-yeon (Gong Hyo-jin), kidnapped along with the warhead) unintentionally find themselves time traveling back from 2005 to 1572, and wind up in the middle of a skirmish between Joseon-era Koreans and Jurchen invaders. After some confusion, a grenade blast routs the Jurchens, and the soldiers immediately wind up with the nickname "Heavenly Soldiers" due to their 'magical' abilities.

The modern Koreans also meet with a regional foreigner who turns out to be none other than the young version of Yi Sun-sin (Park Joong-hoon), the legendary admiral who later becomes instrumental in the defeat of the later Japanese invasion. However, this "General" Yi acts like nothing like either of the modern Korean histories illustrate him: he is a petty thief and ginseng smuggler who just failed his military Gwageo exam, and seeing no future for himself, has turned to crime in order to survive. Yi also stole and hid the group's small arms shortly after their arrival. Unfortunately, a little peasant girl caught him burying the weapons and later retrieves one of the handguns, whereupon she is caught by two Jurchen spies sent to look for the "Heavenly Soldiers".

With nothing better to do other than try to fix history, Major Park attempts to train Yi in the military skills he was so known for, while Major Kang and his men search the area for the nuclear device, which has gone missing during their transit. Not understanding their motivations, Yi is highly resistant to the modern Koreans' attempt to change his lowly lifestyle until he ends up captured by the Jurchens, who are aware of his association with the "Heavenly Soldiers" and attempt to make him lead them to the Koreans by killing the peasant girl. The North Koreans stumble upon Yi and free him, and also find the warhead in the tent of one of the war leaders. However, Kang is forced to kill the son of a war leader sleeping in the same tent, and in retaliation the Jurchens initiate movement to violently root out the modern Koreans.

With the warhead back in their possession, and the timing and location of the comet's overhead passing accurately calculated by Dr. Kim, the "Heavenly Soldiers" prepare to leave the past as it currently stands. Yi, incensed by the barbarians' cruelty, returns to the modern Koreans with their weapons and the elders of the girl's village, who plead with the "Heavenly Soldiers" to help them, and the modern Koreans relent. When Majors Park and Kang debate over the strategy that would work best for the villagers, Yi, beginning to find his legendary tactical competence, successfully argues for a combination of ambushes and a last stand.

That night, before the arrival of the Jurchens, the modern Koreans prepare to leave the past, as the comet would unexpectedly perigee later the next day. When Park advises Yi to save his life as well, Yi protests but is knocked out and carried off. Kang, who knows he will be hunted down as soon as he returns to the present, elects to go back to the village to help defend it from the Jurchens; the other modern Koreans stay behind for their own reasons as well. Meanwhile, the stubborn Yi manages to escape his confinement and joins the "Heavenly Soldiers" and the villagers in their battle against the Jurchens. The invaders are defeated after a long and bloody engagement, but out of the modern soldiers only Park and North Korean sergeant Choi survive alongside Yi. Dr. Kim and the warhead make it back to the present, where she reports their experiences to the Korean generals. But despite her appeals to honor the sacrifice the men have made to preserve Korea's present and future, her superiors decide to turn over the warhead.

In the final scene, Dr. Kim visits a local memorial to the still-venerated Admiral Yi. The scene switches to the opening sequence of the Battle of Myeongnyang Strait, the legendary sea battle where Yi and only 13 Korean ships successfully destroyed an over 300-strong Japanese armada. Aboard his flagship, Yi, alluding to the Chinese proverb "in life there is death, in death there is life," gives the order to charge into battle, with Park and Choi by his side as his staff officers.

== Cast ==
- Park Joong-hoon as Yi Sun-sin
- Kim Seung-woo as Kang Min-gil
- Hwang Jung-min as Park Jung-woo
- Gong Hyo-jin as Kim Su-yeon
- Kim Byeong-chun
- Kim Seung-cheol
- Kim Su-hyeon as Won Hun
- Ma Dong-seok as Hwang Sang-wook
- Kim Hye-eun
- Min Kyung-jin
- Kim Ku-taek
- Lee Han-sol

== Reception ==
Financed with a comfortable budget by South Korean standards (US$7–8 million), the film was a relative commercial success in 2005. Its theme - where North and South Koreans are forced into alliance under the leadership of a hero venerated in both parts of contemporary Korea - is clearly intended as a plea for Korean reunification.
