= Love Fiction =

- Theatrical release poster
- Hangul: 러브 픽션
- RR: Reobeu piksyeon
- MR: Rŏbŭ p'iksyŏn
- Directed by: Jeon Kye-soo
- Written by: Jeon Kye-soo
- Produced by: Shin Young-il; Eom Yong-hoon; Na Byeong-joon
- Starring: Ha Jung-woo; Gong Hyo-jin
- Cinematography: Kim Yeong-min
- Edited by: Kim Hyeong-joo
- Music by: Kim Dong-ki
- Production companies: Samgeori Pictures; Fantagio Pictures
- Distributed by: Next Entertainment World
- Release date: February 29, 2012
- Running time: 121 minutes
- Country: South Korea
- Language: Korean
- Budget: US$1.8 million
- Box office: US$11.4 million

Love Fiction (Korean: 러브 픽션) is a 2012 South Korean romantic comedy film written and directed by Jeon Kye-soo, and starring Ha Jung-woo and Gong Hyo-jin. The film was released on February 29, 2012.

== Plot ==
Goo Joo-wol (Ha Jung-woo) is a novelist (and part-time bartender) suffering writer's block and he has not been able to write anything for the past couple of years. A hopeless romantic, he looks to find artistic inspiration in every woman he meets, but ends up only with despair and heartache. One day, his publisher asks him to come along to a book fair in Germany for a change of pace. There he meets Hee-jin (Gong Hyo-jin), a film distributor who is there to survey the European film market at an event in Berlin. Unsurprisingly, he falls in love instantly, and upon returning to Seoul, he writes her a love letter displaying his odd sense of humor, which convinces her to go out on a date with him. As their relationship progresses, Joo-wol writes a bestselling pulp noir serial with a main character loosely based on Hee-jin. However, with this newfound popularity he begins to discover more than he would like to know about his girlfriend's complicated history with men.

== Cast ==
- Ha Jung-woo as Goo Joo-wol / Detective Ma Dong-wook
- Gong Hyo-jin as Lee Hee-jin / Kim Hae-young
- Jo Hee-bong as Publisher Kwak / Detective squad chief Kwak
- Lee Byung-joon as M
- Ji Jin-hee as Goo Joo-ro, Joo-wol's older brother
- Yoo In-na as Soo-jung / Kyung-sook
- Kim Ji-hoon as Hwang / Detective Ryu
- Seo Hyun-woo as Yi-gyu
- Choi Doo-ri as Kyung-ja
- Kwak Do-won as Director Hwang / Murdered senator
- Kim Seong-gi as Dr. Pyo
- Choi Yu-hwa as Min-ji / Veronica
- Park Young-soo as Young-shik / Director Jo
- Jo Yong-joon as Sysop
- Lee Jun-hyeok as Professor Jeong
- Kim Hye-hwa as Ma-yi
- Kim Jae-hwa as Joo-hee
- Park Joon-myun as Baek Sun-young
- Choi Won-tae as Baek Seon-il
- Kang Shin-cheol as Hee-jin's ex-husband
- Son Byung-wook as Joo-wol's high school gym coach
- Jeon Su-ji as art teacher
- Kim Hye-ji as beauty salon hairdresser
- Chi Woo as Joo-wol as a high school teen
- Yeom Hyun-seo as little girl Ye-ja

== Production ==
This is Jeon Kye-soo's third feature film following his 2006 debut Midnight Ballad for Ghost Theater (a surreal musical comedy that won the Baeksang award for Best New Director), the short film U AND ME in the 2008 omnibus If You Were Me 4, and 2010's Hong Sang-soo-style indie Lost and Found.

With a background in stage and dance, Jeon said he was inspired by French director Jean-Pierre Jeunet and his 1991 film Delicatessen to become a director.

The script was completed in 2007 but Jeon couldn't find anyone to invest in the unconventional romantic comedy, largely because industry insiders considered the plot to be too difficult for the general public to understand. The script was written for Ha Jung-woo and he committed to the film from the beginning, but Jeon said, "We had this good actor Ha Jung-woo but investors changed their minds because they thought the script lacked widespread appeal and the public wouldn't like or understand it."

Jeon first met producer Eom Yong-hoon while making Midnight Ballad for Ghost Theater and the two developed a friendship. When production of Love Fiction was cancelled in 2009, Eom sold his apartment in order to launch his own production company Samgeori Pictures because he wanted to develop Jeon's script into a film. (Eom also produced 2011's surprise hit Silenced.)

Filming began in 2011, with Gong Hyo-jin replacing Kang Hye-jung as the leading lady. Jeon said of Ha and Gong, "They were perfect in many ways. They gave us their best in just a couple of takes. I couldn't have asked for more than that."

Explaining the puzzling name of Goo Joo-wol, Jeon said "I find the (name's) sound important. It has that sound of a character that steps out the door of his house at around 2 p.m. in his pajamas, loitering about without doing much, like a neighborhood rogue complaining about society."

Similar to the fantastical style of Cédric Klapisch's Auberge Espagnole, Joo-wol's complex inner side is displayed through conversations shared with an imaginary character 'M'. In making Joo-wol the focus, the film shows how men beg for love and quickly lose interest in their partners once they are stuck in a relationship.

Touted as a "Male Bridget Jones" and a "Korean 500 Days of Summer", the insightful love story tracks the hero's bumbling journey through modern dating, which turns out to be a lot harder than he thought. "The film is hopefully everything that a man can experience in love," said Jeon, "in two hours" (of running time).

== Soundtrack ==
Album information	Track listing
Love Fiction OST: Released: February 27, 2012; Label: Mirrorball Music	Track listing: 1. 러브픽션 (Love fiction) – Park Ju-won; 2. 방울토마토 (Cherry tomatoes) – Kim Ji-hoon; 3. 하이파 여인 (Hyper woman) – Park Ju-won; 4. For Suicide – Kim Dong-ki; 5. Chanson De Ma Vie – Jeon Yoo-jin; 6. 구애서한 (求愛書翰) (Courtship letter) – Kim Dong-ki; 7. True Love – 서교동꽃거지, Wild Dingo; 8. Romantic Night – Kim Dong-ki; 9. Romantist – Lee Tae-kyung; 10. 바람에 기대어 (Leaning against the wind) – Jeon Yoo-jin; 11. Sweet Amore – Park Ju-won; 12. Detective Ma – Kim Dong-ki; 13. I Wanna Know You – Kim Ji-hoon; 14. Failure – Wild Dingo; 15. A Detective's Feeler – Kim Dong-ki; 16. Mephistoculas – Kim Dong-ki; 17. Laid Back – Jeon Yoo-jin; 18. Inside of Me – Taru; 19. Contrast – Park Ju-won; 20. Know (Letter to Alaska) – Jeon Yoo-jin; 21. 알라스카 (Alaska) – Ha Jung-woo, Kim Ji-hoon, Seo Hyun-woo, Choi Doo-ri; 22. 또 다른 알라스카 (Another Alaska) – Sang-woon

== Release ==
=== Box office ===
Ticket sales surpassed expectations, reaching 1 million viewers in only 5 days of release, and breaking even on the 8th day. It was the 16th most-watched Korean film in 2012, at 1,726,202 admissions.

=== Critical reception ===
The film is unique in that it unfolds 100% from Joo-wol's perspective, thus Jeon anticipated some negative feedback from women, saying Gong did have several problems with the story, but the film is his "response to those concerns." Several female moviegoers who attended advance screenings expressed their discomfort after watching it, flooding the blogosphere with their voices against the quasi-universal praise from the press. Jeon said, "Reality can be ragged, pathetic and desperate," adding that he expected the audience to ask why they have to watch that sad truth on the silver screen instead of a fairy tale with a prince charming. Whereas most Korean films present a more positive and less nuanced picture of love, the film highlights the challenges in romantic relationships. The Korea Times describes the film as "a perplexing tribute to love, a brutally honest portrayal of its progressive steps — from courtship to fizzling out. It is a satire of the bachelor social ladder, on top of which sit three-piece suits and white gowns while the rock bottom is occupied by poor artists. It is a story of a writer's block, which the protagonist hopes to overcome with a muse. It is a story of the man in its unpasteurized form: that needy, selfish and affection-seeking part of the human male species taking shape as the protagonist."

== Awards and nominations ==
Year	Award	Category	Recipients	Result
2012	48th Baeksang Arts Awards	Best New Director	Jeon Kye-soo	Nominated
2012	48th Baeksang Arts Awards	Best Screenplay	Jeon Kye-soo	Won
2012	33rd Blue Dragon Film Awards	Best Actress	Gong Hyo-jin	Nominated
2012	33rd Blue Dragon Film Awards	Popular Star Award	Gong Hyo-jin	Won
