= Collective Invention =

2015 film

- Theatrical poster
- Hangul: 돌연변이
- Lit.: Mutant
- RR: Doryeonbyeoni
- MR: Toryŏnbyŏni
- Directed by: Kwon Oh-kwang
- Screenplay by: Kwon Oh-kwang
- Produced by: Kim Woo-sang
- Starring: Lee Kwang-soo; Lee Chun-hee; Park Bo-young
- Cinematography: Kim Tae-soo
- Edited by: Kim Hye-kyeong; Kim Woo-il
- Music by: Jeong Hyun-soo
- Production companies: Woo Sang Film; Fides Spatium
- Distributed by: CJ Entertainment
- Release dates: 14 September 2015 (TIFF); 22 October 2015 (Korea)
- Running time: 92 minutes
- Country: South Korea
- Language: Korean
- Box office: US$1.6 million

Collective Invention (Korean: 돌연변이) is a South Korean black comedy film written and directed by Kwon Oh-kwang. It is about a hapless fish-man's meteoric rise to celebrity and subsequent fall from grace. The film was screened in the Vanguard section of the 2015 Toronto International Film Festival.

== Plot ==
A medical experiment gone wrong and a man mutates due to side effects from an experimental drug administered to him, turning him into a fish-man. When his supposedly girlfriend posts the story of her 'fishy' boyfriend on the internet, a wannabe reporter starts digging for the truth, covering the news about the mutant fish-man.

== Cast ==
- Lee Kwang-soo as Park Gu
- Lee Chun-hee as Sang-won
- Park Bo-young as Ju-jin
- Jang Gwang as Gu's father
- Lee Byung-joon as Dr. Byun
- Kim Hee-won as Lawyer Kim
- Jung In-gi as Dong-sik
- Choi Ji-ho as Chairman's assistant

== Reception ==
The film was number five on its opening weekend, with ₩578 million.

== Awards and nominations ==
Year	Award	Category	Recipient	Result
2016	3rd Wildflower Film Awards	Best New Director (Narrative Films)	Kwon Oh-kwang	Nominated
