= Chung Serang =

South Korean author

- Born: September 15, 1984 (age 41); Seoul
- Education: Korea University
- Occupation: writer
- Writing career
- Language: Korean
- Period: 2010–present
- Genres: science fiction, fantasy
- Notable work: Fifty People
- Notable awards: Changbi Novel Award, Hankook Ilbo Literary Award

Korean name
- Hangul: 정세랑
- Hanja: 鄭世朗
- RR: Jeong Serang
- MR: Chŏng Serang

Chung Serang (정세랑) is a South Korean science fiction and fantasy writer. She won the 7th Changbi Novel Award in 2013, and Hankook Ilbo Literary Award in 2017. Before her debut, she worked as an editor in Minumsa and Munkandongne. At the age of 26, She was the youngest Korean writer to have her books translated into Japanese. Her novel, School Nurse An Eunyoung (보건교사 안은영) was made into a Netflix original series. In 2023, she wrote the episode Journey to the Dark Head (Star Wars: Visions; Season 2).

== Works in Korean (partial) ==
Novels

- 덧니가 보고 싶어 (I want to see your Snaggletooth; Deonniga bogo sipeo) (2011)
- 지구에서 한아뿐 (Only Han-ah on Earth; Jigueseo Hanabbun) (2012)
- 이만큼 가까이 (This Closer; Imankeum gakkai) (2014)
- 재인, 재욱, 재훈 (Jaein, Jaeuk, Jaehun) (2014)
- 보건교사 안은영 (School Nurse An Eunyeong; Bogeongyosa An Eunyeong) (2015)
- 피프티 피플 (Fifty People) (2016)

Short story collections

- 옥상에서 만나요 (Meet at the balcony; Oksangeseo mannayo) (2017)

== Awards ==
- 2013 Changbi Novel Award
- 2017 Hankook Ilbo Literary Award
