= Blue Dragon Film Award for Best Art Direction =

Film Award

- Awarded for: Best Art Direction
- Country: South Korea
- Presented by: Blue Dragon Film Awards
- First award: 1963
- Website: www.blueaward.co.kr

The Blue Dragon Film Award for Best Art Direction is one of the awards that is presented annually at the Blue Dragon Film Awards by Sports Chosun, which is typically held at the end of the year.

== Winners ==
| # | Year | Winner | Film |
|---|---|---|---|
| 1 | 1963 | Lee Bong-seon | Kinship |
| 2 | 1964 | Park Seok-in | Extra Human Being |
| 3 | 1965 | Jeong Woo-taek | Heukmaek |
| 4 | 1966 | Noh In-taek | I Will Be King for a Day |
| 5 | 1967 | Park Seok-in | Han (Regret) |
| 6 | 1969 | Im Yeong-su | You |
| 7 | 1970 | Kim Ho-kyun | The Old Jar Craftsman |
| 8 | 1971 | Park Seok-in | Woman of Fire |
| 9 | 1972 | Kim Yu-jin | Drum Sound of Saenamteo |
| 10 | 1973 | Park Seok-in | The Three-Day Reign |
| 25 | 2004 | Kim Ki-chul | Once Upon a Time in High School |
| 26 | 2005 | Lee Hyeong-ju, Cho Geun-hyun | Duelist |
| 27 | 2006 | Cho Geun-hyun, Hong Joo-hee | Forbidden Quest |
| 28 | 2007 | Kim Yu-jeong, Lee Min-bok | Epitaph |
| 29 | 2008 | Cho Hwa-sung | The Good, the Bad, the Weird |
| 30 | 2009 | Cho Hwa-sung, Choi Hyeon-seok | Private Eye |
| 31 | 2010 | Lee Ha-jun | The Housemaid |
| 32 | 2011 | Ryu Seong-hui | The Front Line |
| 33 | 2012 | Oh Heung-seok | Masquerade |
| 34 | 2013 | Ondrej Nekvasil | Snowpiercer |
| 35 | 2014 | Lee Ha-jun | Haemoo |
| 36 | 2015 | Ryu Seong-hui | Ode to My Father |
| 37 | 2016 | Ryu Seong-hui | The Handmaiden |
| 38 | 2017 | Lee Hoo-kyung | The Battleship Island |
| 39 | 2018 | Park Il-hyun | The Spy Gone North |
| 40 | 2019 | Lee Ha-jun | Parasite |
| 41 | 2020 | Bae Jung-yoon | Samjin Company English Class |
| 42 | 2021 | Kim Bo-mook | Escape from Mogadishu |
| 43 | 2022 | Han Ah-reum | Kingmaker |
| 44 | 2023 | Jung Yi-jin | Cobweb |
| 45 | 2024 | Seo Seong-gyeong | Exhuma |
| 46 | 2025 | Lee Na-kyum | Uprising |

== General references ==
- "Winners and nominees lists". Blue Dragon Film Awards (in Korean). Archived from the original on 27 January 2022.
- "Blue Dragon Film Awards". Naver (in Korean).
