= Choi Jin-sung =

South Korean filmmaker (born 1975)

- Born: 1975 (age 49–50); South Korea
- Occupation(s): Film director, screenwriter

Korean name
- Hangul: 최진성
- RR: Choe Jinseong
- MR: Ch'oe Chinsŏng

Choi Jin-sung (Korean: 최진성; born 1975) is a South Korean film director and screenwriter. Choi's works reveal aspects of Korean society that have been marginalized by the country's strong waves of economic development, including FuckUmentary (2001), Camellia Project (2005), Reservoir Dogs Take 1: South-han River (with Windy City) (2010), Reservoir Dogs Take 2: Nakdong River (with Bard & Jung Mina) (2011) and Jam Docu GANGJEONG (2011).

He also directed the documentary film I AM (2012) which follows 32 SM Town K-pop artists on their journey to become the first Asian singers to stage their milestone SMTown Live '10 World Tour concert at Madison Square Garden in New York and the romance/mystery thriller Steel Cold Winter (2013) starring Kim Yoon-hye and Kim Shi-hoo.

== Filmography ==
- FuckUmentary (documentary, 2001) - director, cinematographer
- The World Cup of Their Own ver. 2.0 (short film, 2002) - director, cinematographer, planner, editor
- For Whom The Gun Tolls (short film, 2003) - director, editor
- Hitchhiking (short film, 2004) - director, screenwriter
- Independent Film Maker's Project To Abolish The National Security Law (documentary, 2004) - director, editor
- Catch Me If You Can (short film, 2004) - director
- Erotic Chaos Boy (documentary, 2005) - director, screenwriter, cinematographer, production director, editor, actor
- Camellia Project (2005) - director, screenwriter, editor
- Dasepo Naughty Girls (2006) - screenwriter
- Into the Breeze (documentary, 2008) - actor
- Project 320 (documentary short, 2009) - director
- Reservoir Dogs Take 1: South-han River (with Windy City) (short film, 2010) - director
- Reservoir Dogs Take 2: Nakdong River (with Bard & Jung Mina) (short film, 2011) - director
- Lee-Sang's strange reversible reaction (short film, 2011) - director
- Jam Docu GANGJEONG (documentary, 2011) - director, actor
- I AM (documentary, 2012) - director
- Steel Cold Winter (2013) - director, script editor, actor
- The Plan (documentary, 2017) - director
- The Reservoir Game (documentary, 2017) - director
- Cyber Hell: Exposing an Internet Horror (documentary, Netflix; 2022) - director
