= 26th Blue Dragon Film Awards =

2005 South Korean award ceremony

- Date: November 29, 2005
- Site: KBS Hall, Yeouido, Seoul, South Korea
- Hosted by: Jung Joon-ho; Kim Hye-soo

Television coverage
- Network: KBS

The 26th Blue Dragon Film Awards ceremony was held on November 29, 2005, at the KBS Hall in Yeouido, Seoul, South Korea. Hosted by actors Jung Joon-ho and Kim Hye-soo, it was presented by Sports Chosun and broadcast on KBS.

== Nominations and winners ==
Complete list of nominees and winners:

(Winners denoted in bold)

Best Film	Best Director
**Lady Vengeance**; Blood Rain; Marathon; Welcome to Dongmakgol; You Are My Sunshine	**Park Jin-pyo** - **You Are My Sunshine**; Im Sang-soo - The President's Last Bang; Kim Dae-seung - Blood Rain; Kim Jee-woon - A Bittersweet Life; Park Chan-wook - Lady Vengeance
Best Actor	Best Actress
**Hwang Jung-min** - **You Are My Sunshine**; Cho Seung-woo - Marathon; Lee Byung-hun - A Bittersweet Life; Park Hae-il - Rules of Dating; Ryoo Seung-bum - Crying Fist	**Lee Young-ae** - **Lady Vengeance**; Jeon Do-yeon - You Are My Sunshine; Kang Hye-jung - Rules of Dating; Kim Jung-eun - Blossom Again; Son Ye-jin - April Snow
Best Supporting Actor	Best Supporting Actress
**Im Ha-ryong** - **Welcome to Dongmakgol**; Ahn Sung-ki - Duelist; Gong Hyung-jin - Marrying the Mafia II; Hwang Jung-min - A Bittersweet Life; Park Yong-woo - Blood Rain	**Kang Hye-jung** - **Welcome to Dongmakgol**; Kim Eul-dong - Mapado; Kim Soo-mi - Mapado; Na Moon-hee - You Are My Sunshine; Seo Young-hee - All for Love
Best New Actor	Best New Actress
**Chun Jung-myung** - **The Aggressives**; Lee Tae-sung - Blossom Again; Park Gun-hyung - Innocent Steps; Tak Jae-hoon - Marrying the Mafia II; Yoon Kye-sang - Flying Boys	**Kim Ji-soo** - **This Charming Girl**; Han Ji-hye - My Boyfriend Is Type B; Jo Yi-jin - The Aggressives; Jung Yu-mi - Blossom Again; Kim Ok-vin - Voice
Best New Director	Best Screenplay
**Jeong Yoon-cheol** - **Marathon**; Choo Chang-min - Mapado; Han Jae-rim - Rules of Dating; Lee Yoon-ki - This Charming Girl; Park Kwang-hyun - Welcome to Dongmakgol	**Han Jae-rim, Go Yoon-hee** - **Rules of Dating**; Jang Jin, Park Kwang-hyun, Kim Joong - Welcome to Dongmakgol; Jeong Yoon-cheol - Marathon; Min Kyu-dong, Yu Seong-hyeop - All for Love; Park Jin-pyo - You Are My Sunshine
Best Cinematography	Best Lighting
**Kim Ji-yong** - **A Bittersweet Life**; Choi Young-hwan - Blood Rain; Chung Chung-hoon - Lady Vengeance; Hwang Ki-seok - Duelist; Kim Woo-hyung - The President's Last Bang	**Shin Kyung-man** - **Duelist**; Go Nak-seon - The President's Last Bang; Kim Sung-kwan - Blood Rain; Park Hyun-won - Lady Vengeance; Shin Sang-yeol - A Bittersweet Life
Best Art Direction	Best Music
**Cho Geun-hyun, Lee Hyeong-ju** - **Duelist**; Cho Hwa-sung - Lady Vengeance; Lee Joon-seung - Welcome to Dongmakgol; Min Eon-ok - Blood Rain; Ryu Seong-hui - A Bittersweet Life	**Kim Jun-seong** - **Marathon**; Bang Jun-seok - You Are My Sunshine; Joe Hisaishi - Welcome to Dongmakgol; Jang Young-gyu, Dalpalan - A Bittersweet Life; Jo Yeong-wook - Lady Vengeance
Technical Award	Popular Star Award
**Shin Jae-ho** - **Blood Rain (Special Make-up Effects)**; Jang Seong-ho - Duelist (CG); Jo Yi-seok - Welcome to Dongmakgol (CG); Kim Sang-bum, Kim Jae-bum - Lady Vengeance (Editing); Moon In-dae - All for Love (Editing)	**Ha Ji-won** - **Duelist**; **Cho Seung-woo** - **Marathon**; **Gang Dong-won** - **Duelist**; **Kim Soo-mi** - **Mapado**
Best Couple Award	Audience Choice Award for Most Popular Film
**Hwang Jung-min** and **Jeon Do-yeon** - **You Are My Sunshine**	**Welcome to Dongmakgol**
