= Jo Yi-jin =

South Korean actress (born 1982)

- Born: Jo Bo-hyun; December 26, 1982 (age 43); South Korea
- Occupation: Actress
- Years active: 2003–2007; 2012–present
- Agent: O.M.G.

Korean name
- Hangul: 조보현
- RR: Jo Bohyeon
- MR: Cho Pohyŏn

Stage name
- Hangul: 조이진
- RR: Jo Ijin
- MR: Cho Ijin

Jo Yi-jin (Korean: 조이진; born December 26, 1982), birth name Jo Bo-hyun, is a South Korean actress. She is best known for the films The Aggressives (2005) and Over the Border (2006).

== Filmography ==
=== Film ===
Year	Title	Role
2005	The Aggressives	Han-joo
2006	Over the Border	Lee Yeon-hwa
2015	Don't Forget Me	

=== Television series ===
Year	Title	Role
2003	My Fair Lady	Yoo Ji-in
2004	Stained Glass	Park Tae-hee/Mako
2005	MBC Best Theater "The Navigator of My Life"	Lee Hyun-soo
2012	Korean Peninsula	Park Hye-jung
2013	The Eldest	Kim Young-ran

=== Music video appearance ===
Year	Song title	Artist
2003	"Loveholic"	Loveholic

== Awards and nominations ==
Year	Award	Category	Nominated work	Result
2005	26th Blue Dragon Film Awards	Best New Actress	The Aggressives	Nominated
2005	4th Korean Film Awards	Best New Actress	The Aggressives	Nominated
2005	8th Director's Cut Awards	Best New Actress	The Aggressives	Won
2006	42nd Baeksang Arts Awards	Best New Actress (Film)	The Aggressives	Nominated
2006	43rd Grand Bell Awards	Best New Actress	The Aggressives	Nominated
2006	5th Korean Film Awards	Best New Actress	Over the Border	Nominated
2007	44th Grand Bell Awards	Best New Actress	Over the Border	Won
