= Lady Vengeance =

2005 South Korean film by Park Chan-wook

- Theatrical release poster
- Hangul: 친절한 금자씨
- RR: Chinjeolhan Geumja ssi
- MR: Ch'injŏrhan Kŭmja ssi
- Directed by: Park Chan-wook
- Written by: Jeong Seo-kyeong; Park Chan-wook
- Produced by: Jo Yeong-wook; Lee Tae-hun
- Starring: Lee Young-ae; Choi Min-sik
- Cinematography: Chung Chung-hoon
- Edited by: Kim Jae-bum; Kim Sang-bum
- Music by: Jo Yeong-wook; Choi Seung-hyun
- Distributed by: CJ Entertainment
- Release date: 29 July 2005
- Running time: 115 minutes
- Country: South Korea
- Languages: Korean; English; Japanese
- Budget: $4.5 million
- Box office: $23.8 million

Lady Vengeance (Korean: 친절한 금자씨; lit. 'Kind Miss Geum-ja'; titled Sympathy for Lady Vengeance in some countries) is a 2005 South Korean neo-noir psychological thriller film directed by Park Chan-wook. The film is the third and final installment in Park's Vengeance Trilogy, following Sympathy for Mr. Vengeance (2002) and Oldboy (2003). It stars Lee Young-ae as Lee Geum-ja, a woman released from prison after serving the sentence for a murder she did not commit. The film tells her story of revenge against the real murderer.

The film debuted on 29 July 2005 in South Korea, and competed for the Golden Lion at the 62nd Venice International Film Festival in September 2005. While it failed to win in competition, it did walk away with Cinema of The Future, the Young Lion Award, and the Best Innovated Film Award in the non-competition section. It won the award for Best Film at the 26th Blue Dragon Film Awards. The film had its US premiere on 30 September 2005 at the New York Film Festival. It began its limited release in North American theatres on 5 May 2006, to favorable reviews from critics.

== Plot ==
A Christian musical procession waits with a symbolic block of tofu outside a prison for the release of Lee Geum-ja. Convicted of kidnapping and murdering a 5-year-old schoolboy, Won-mo, 13 years earlier, Geum-ja became a national sensation because of her youth, saintly appearance, and willing confession to the crime. However, she became an inspirational model during her incarceration, and her supposed spiritual transformation earned her an early release. Geum-ja quickly reveals that her behavior was a cover to further her revenge plans. She visits the other paroled inmates, calling in favors that include food, shelter, and weapons. She begins work in a pastry shop and gets involved with a young shop assistant, Geun-shik.

It is revealed that as a young high school student, Geum-ja had become pregnant and, out of desperation, turned to her teacher Mr. Baek for help. Mr. Baek in return, forced Geum-ja to assist in his kidnapping racket, and used her to lure 5-year-old Won-mo to him. He murdered Won-mo after receiving the ransom, and then kidnapped Geum-ja's infant daughter, threatening to murder the baby if she did not take the blame. The detective on the case was aware of Geum-ja's innocence, but ultimately helped secure her conviction due to public pressure.

Geum-ja discovers that her daughter, now an adolescent named Jenny, was adopted by Australian parents. Jenny does not speak Korean and is initially resistant to her mother's outreach, though she does return with Geum-ja to Seoul to bond. Geum-ja plans to kidnap and murder Mr. Baek, now a children's teacher at a preschool, as revenge for the murder of Won-mo, for sending her to prison, and for robbing her of her child. She enlists the aid of Mr. Baek's wife, another ex-convict. Mr. Baek hires thugs to kill Geum-ja and Jenny, but Geum-ja kills them and Mr. Baek is subdued.

Mr. Baek wakes up tied to a chair in an abandoned schoolhouse. On his cell phone strap, Geum-ja discovers the orange marble from Won-mo's crime scene, which had been taken as a trophy, and is horrified to see other children's trinkets also on the strap. After shooting him in both feet, she discovers snuff tapes in his apartment of the other children he had murdered. He had not been part of a ransoming racket; he would simply kidnap and murder a child from each school he worked at. After killing each one, he would fake a ransom call to the parents, collect the money, and move on to a different school.

Sickened that four more children died because the real killer was not turned in, Geum-ja and the original case detective contact the parents and relatives of the missing children and they meet at the school. After watching each tape, the group decides to murder Mr. Baek together. They take turns beating, mutilating and torturing him until he is dead, then take a group photo, ensuring that none of them can turn in the others without implicating themselves. They then bury the corpse in a nearby forest.

Geum-ja, the detective, and the relatives all converge at Geum-ja's bakery for a last meeting. After everyone leaves, Geum-ja has a vision of Won-mo and attempts to beg for his forgiveness. The vision of Won-mo shifts into a teenage one at the age that he would have been if he had lived, and Geum-ja becomes gagged, unable to apologise. Later, Geum-ja finds Jenny and instructs her daughter to live purely, like the all white frosting covered cake that she has baked and given to her. Jenny replies that Geum-ja can live purely in the future also. Geum-ja breaks down and buries her face in the cake as Jenny hugs her.

== Cast ==
- Lee Young-ae as Lee Geum-ja
- Kwon Yea-young as Jenny
- Kim Si-hoo as Geun-shik
- Oh Dal-su as Mr. Chang
- Lee Seung-shin as Park Yi-jeong
- Go Soo-hee as Ma-nyeo ("Witch")
- Kim Byeong-ok as The Preacher
- Ra Mi-ran as Oh Su-hee
- Seo Young-ju as Kim Yang-hee
- Kim Boo-seon as Woo So-young
- Ko Chang-seok as So-young's husband
- Lee Dae-yeon as parent of abducted child
- Nam Il-woo as Detective Choi
- Kim Hee-soo as Se-hyun
- Oh Kwang-rok as Se-hyun's father
- Lee Byung-joon as Dong-hwa
- Choi Jung-woo as Dong-hwa's father
- Ryoo Seung-wan as passerby
- Song Kang-ho as assassin 1
- Shin Ha-kyun as assassin 2
- Yoo Ji-tae as grown-up Won-mo, as seen in a vision
- Seo Ji-hee as Eun-joo
- Won Mi-won as Eun-joo's grandmother
- Kim Ik-tae as Won-mo's father
- Kim You-jung as Jae-kyung
- Im Soo-kyung as prison officer
- Choi Hee-jin as prisoner 3
- Jeon Sung-ae as prisoner 4
- Kim Jin-goo as Ko Seon-sook
- Kang Hye-jung as TV announcer
- Tony Barry as Jenny's adoptive father
- Anne Cordiner as Jenny's adoptive mother
- Choi Min-sik as Mr. Baek (Baek Han-sang)

== Production ==
=== Music ===
The film's score, composed by Choi Seung-hyun, is heavily baroque-themed, featuring many pieces with harpsichord, baroque guitars, and other instruments. The main theme is an edited version of Vivaldi's "Ah ch'infelice sempre" from "Cessate, omai cessate". The song is appropriate since the unedited version's melody is sung by a woman who is seeking revenge on a man who has betrayed her, much like the film itself. The 24th Caprice by Paganini also appears many times. The final scene is accompanied by an arrangement by Jordi Savall of the Spanish song Mareta, a lullaby in the Valencian language by an anonymous 17th century composer from Alicante.

=== Fade to Black and White version ===
Two versions of the film exist, the standard version and the "Fade to Black and White version". The latter version begins in full colour, but throughout the film the colour gradually fades until it is totally black and white at the end of the film. In conjunction with the camera technique of removing the colours, there is also a change in the environmental colours used in backgrounds and clothing. At the beginning of the film, the environments contain a lot of primary colours, whereas toward the end of the film pastel shades, blacks and whites are used. Geum-ja wears a blue coat in the early part of the film, but this is replaced with a black leather coat at the end. The brightly coloured walls of the prison and Geum-ja's bedroom are replaced with the grey walls of the school.

Both versions of the film were shown in Korean cinemas, although the fading version was presented only in digital format at a few DLP-equipped multiplexes.

This version has since been made available on the Korean Special Edition DVD of Lady Vengeance (with DTS audio only), and in the Tartan Films and Arrow Films DVD and Blu-ray boxset releases of the Vengeance trilogy. On the Tartan boxset packaging, the version is incorrectly titled "Fade to White version", as does the Arrow Blu-ray menu.

== Release ==
=== Box office ===
Lady Vengeance opened in Korea on 29 July 2005 to blockbuster business, grossing US$7,382,034 in its opening weekend and grossing a total of US$22,590,402 in South Korea alone. In terms of total admissions, it was the seventh biggest domestic release in Korea that year, and the eighth biggest overall with 3,650,000 tickets sold nationwide. It achieved great financial success.

The film opened in limited release in two North American theatres on 28 April 2006 under the title Lady Vengeance. In its opening weekend, it earned US$9,850 (US$4,925 per screen). It grossed US$211,667 during its entire run, playing on 15 screens during its widest point and grossed US$23,809,504 worldwide.

=== Critical reception ===
On the review aggregator website Rotten Tomatoes, 76% of 87 critics' reviews are positive. The website's consensus reads: "Stylistically flashy and gruesomely violent, Sympathy for Lady Vengeance fits in nicely with the other two films of Park's revenge trilogy." Metacritic, which uses a weighted average, assigned the film a score of 75 out of 100, based on 23 critics, indicating "generally favorable" reviews.

== Awards and nominations ==
Award	Year	Category	Recipient(s)	Result	Ref.
Blue Dragon Film Awards	2005	Best Film	Lady Vengeance	Won	
Blue Dragon Film Awards	2005	Best Actress	Lee Young-ae	Won	
Blue Dragon Film Awards	2005	Best Director	Park Chan-wook	Nominated	
Blue Dragon Film Awards	2005	Best Cinematography	Chung Chung-hoon	Nominated	
Blue Dragon Film Awards	2005	Best Lighting	Park Hyun-won	Nominated	
Blue Dragon Film Awards	2005	Best Art Direction	Cho Hwa-sung	Nominated	
Blue Dragon Film Awards	2005	Best Music	Jo Yeong-wook	Nominated	
Blue Dragon Film Awards	2005	Technical Award	Kim Sang-bum, Kim Jae-bum	Nominated	
Korean Film Awards	2005	Best Actress	Lee Young-ae	Nominated	
Korean Film Awards	2005	Best Cinematography	Chung Chung-hoon	Nominated	
Korean Film Awards	2005	Best Editing	Kim Sang-bum, Kim Jae-bum	Nominated	
Korean Film Awards	2005	Best Art Direction	Cho Hwa-sung	Nominated	
Korean Film Awards	2005	Best Music	Jo Yeong-wook	Nominated	
Director's Cut Awards	2005	Best Actress	Lee Young-ae	Won	
Baeksang Arts Awards	2006	Best Actress	Lee Young-ae	Won	
Baeksang Arts Awards	2006	Best Film	Lady Vengeance	Nominated	
Baeksang Arts Awards	2006	Best Director	Park Chan-wook	Nominated	
Grand Bell Awards	2006	Best Film	Lady Vengeance	Nominated	
Grand Bell Awards	2006	Best Director	Park Chan-wook	Nominated	
Grand Bell Awards	2006	Best Actress	Lee Young-ae	Nominated	
Grand Bell Awards	2006	Best New Actor	Kim Shi-hoo	Nominated	
Hong Kong Film Awards	2006	Best Asian Film	Lady Vengeance	Nominated	

== Appearances in popular culture ==
- In the 2017 drama series Saimdang, Memoir of Colors, the character Geum Ja made a cameo appearance (portrayed by the same actress) in a dance club.
- Geum-ja was the inspiration behind Oh Geum-ji of Lowlife Princess: Noir.

== See also ==
- List of Korean-language films
- Revenge play
