= 43rd Grand Bell Awards =

2006 edition of award ceremony

- Official poster
- Date: July 21, 2006
- Site: COEX Convention Hall, Seoul

The 43rd Grand Bell Awards ceremony was held at the COEX Convention Hall in Seoul on July 21, 2006.

== Nominations and winners ==
(Winners denoted in bold)

Best Film	Best Director
**King and the Clown**; Sympathy for Lady Vengeance; Typhoon; Welcome to Dongmakgol; You Are My Sunshine	**Lee Joon-ik** - **King and the Clown**; Kwak Kyung-taek - Typhoon; Min Kyu-dong - All for Love; Park Chan-wook - Sympathy for Lady Vengeance; Park Jin-pyo - You Are My Sunshine
Best Actor	Best Actress
**Kam Woo-sung** - **King and the Clown**; Hwang Jung-min - You Are My Sunshine; Jang Dong-gun - Typhoon; Lee Jung-jae - Typhoon; Ryoo Seung-bum - Bloody Tie	**Jeon Do-yeon** - **You Are My Sunshine**; Jang Jin-young - Blue Swallow; Jun Ji-hyun - Daisy; Kim Hye-soo - The Red Shoes; Lee Young-ae - Sympathy for Lady Vengeance
Best Supporting Actor	Best Supporting Actress
**Yoo Hae-jin** - **King and the Clown**; Ahn Sung-ki - Duelist; Im Ha-ryong - Welcome to Dongmakgol; Jang Hang-sun - Never to Lose; Shin Goo - A Bold Family	**Kang Hye-jung** - **Welcome to Dongmakgol**; Kang Sung-yeon - King and the Clown; Kim Soo-mi - Marrying the Mafia II; Lee Hwi-hyang - Lost in Love; Na Moon-hee - You Are My Sunshine
Best New Actor	Best New Actress
**Lee Joon-gi** - **King and the Clown**; Jung Kyung-ho - All for Love; Kim Min-jun - Never to Lose; Kim Shi-hoo - Sympathy for Lady Vengeance; Tak Jae-hoon - Marrying the Mafia II	**Choo Ja-hyun** - **Bloody Tie**; Han Ji-min - Blue Swallow; Jo Yi-jin - The Aggressives; Kim Yoo-jung - All for Love; Song Hye-kyo - My Girl and I
Best New Director	Best Screenplay
**Han Jae-rim** - **Rules of Dating**; Hwang Byung-guk - Wedding Campaign; Kim Dae-woo - Forbidden Quest; Park Kwang-hyun - Welcome to Dongmakgol; Son Hee-chang - Never to Lose	**Choi Seok-hwan** - **King and the Clown**; Jang Jin, Park Kwang-hyun, Kim Joong - Welcome to Dongmakgol; Kim Dae-woo - Forbidden Quest; Kwak Kyung-taek - Typhoon; Min Kyu-dong, Yu Seong-hyeop - All for Love
Best Cinematography	Best Editing
**Ji Gil-woong** - **King and the Clown**; Hong Kyung-pyo - Typhoon; Hwang Ki-seok - Duelist; Shin Ok-hyun - Holiday; Yoon Hong-sik - Blue Swallow	**Kim Sang-bum, Kim Jae-bum** - **Murder, Take One**; Kim Sang-bum, Kim Jae-bum - Bloody Tie; Kim Sang-bum, Kim Jae-bum - King and the Clown; Ko Im-pyo - Duelist; Park Gwang-il - Typhoon
Best Art Direction	Best Lighting
**Cho Geun-hyun, Lee Hyeong-ju** - **Duelist**; Cho Geun-hyun - Forbidden Quest; Kang Seung-yong - King and the Clown; Kim Chang-gil - Typhoon; Takeuchi Koichi - Blue Swallow	**Yoo Young-jong** - **Typhoon**; Choi Seok-jae - Blue Swallow; Han Gi-eop - King and the Clown; Lee Sung-hwan - Holiday; Shin Kyung-man - Duelist
Best Costume Design	Best Music
**Jung Kyung-hee** - **Forbidden Quest**; Jung Kyung-hee - Duelist; Kim Min-hee - Shadowless Sword; Kwon Yu-jin - Blue Swallow; Shim Hyun-sub - King and the Clown	**Michael Staudacher** - **Blue Swallow**; Joe Hisaishi - Welcome to Dongmakgol; Kim Hyung-suk - Typhoon; Lee Byung-woo - King and the Clown; Shigeru Umebayashi - Daisy
Best Visual Effects	Best Sound Effects
**Kang Jong-ik, Shin Jae-ho, Jeong Do-an** - **Typhoon**; Insight Visual - Typhoon; Jo Yi-seok, Kim Yong-gwan, Min Chi-soon - Welcome to Dongmakgol; Kang Jong-ik, Han Tae-jeong - Blue Swallow; MoFac Studio - Duelist; Oh Choong-young, Kim Jin-sook, Kim Gwang-soo Vampire Cop Ricky	**Eun Hee-soo** - **Blue Swallow**; Hwang Su-yeon, Sung Su-ah, Kim Suk-won - Welcome to Dongmakgol; Jung Kwang-ho, Choi Tae-young - Typhoon; Kim Tan-young, Choi Tae-young - King and the Clown; Lee Tae-gyu, Kim Suk-won - Daisy
Best Planning	50 Years Since Debut Memorial Award
**Oh Jeong-wan** - **You Are My Sunshine**; Eagle Pictures - King and the Clown; Film It Suda - Welcome to Dongmakgol; Lee Seong-chan - Typhoon; Park Chan-wook - Sympathy for Lady Vengeance	**Ahn Sung-ki**
Popularity Award	Korean Wave Popularity Award
**Lee Joon-gi** - **King and the Clown**; **Kang Sung-yeon** - **King and the Clown**	**Lee Joon-gi** - **King and the Clown**; **Lee Young-ae** - **Sympathy for Lady Vengeance**
Lifetime Achievement Award
**Lee Kyung-ja**
