= 42nd Baeksang Arts Awards =

2006 South Korean award ceremony

- Date: April 14, 2006
- Site: Seoul

Television coverage
- Network: SBS

The 42nd Baeksang Arts Awards ceremony took place on April 14, 2006 in Seoul. It was presented by IS Plus Corp. and broadcast on SBS.

== Nominations and winners ==
Complete list of nominees and winners:

(Winners denoted in bold)

=== Film ===
Grand Prize (Film)
**King and the Clown**
Best Film	Best Director (Film)
**Blood Rain**; Blossom Again; Duelist; King and the Clown; Sympathy for Lady Vengeance	**Lee Myung-se** - **Duelist**; Kim Jee-woon - A Bittersweet Life; Lee Joon-ik - King and the Clown; Park Chan-wook - Sympathy for Lady Vengeance; Park Jin-pyo - You Are My Sunshine
Best Actor (Film)	Best Actress (Film)
**Lee Byung-hun** - **A Bittersweet Life**; Cha Seung-won - Blood Rain; Hwang Jung-min - You Are My Sunshine; Jung Jin-young - King and the Clown; Park Hae-il - Rules of Dating	**Lee Young-ae** - **Sympathy for Lady Vengeance**; Jang Jin-young - Blue Swallow; Jeon Do-yeon - You Are My Sunshine; Kang Hye-jung - Rules of Dating; Uhm Jung-hwa - Princess Aurora
Best New Actor (Film)	Best New Actress (Film)
**Lee Joon-gi** - **King and the Clown**; Chun Jung-myung - The Aggressives; Ha Jung-woo - The Unforgiven; Lee Tae-sung - Blossom Again; Eric Mun - Diary of June	**Jung Yu-mi** - **Blossom Again**; Kim Ah-joong - When Romance Meets Destiny; Kim Ok-vin - Voice; Kim Yoo-mi - The Windmill Palm Grove; Song Hye-kyo - My Girl and I
Best New Director (Film)	Best Screenplay (Film)
**Kim Dae-woo** - **Forbidden Quest**; Bang Eun-jin - Princess Aurora; Kim Sung-soo - Running Wild; Park Kwang-hyun - Welcome to Dongmakgol; Yoon Jong-bin - The Unforgiven	**Go Yoon-hee** - **Rules of Dating**; Choi Seok-hwan - King and the Clown; Jung Ji-woo - Blossom Again; Kim Dae-woo - Forbidden Quest; Lee Won-jae - Blood Rain
Most Popular - Actor (Film)	Most Popular - Actress (Film)
**Hyun Bin** - **A Millionaire's First Love**	**Kim Ah-joong** - **When Romance Meets Destiny**

=== Television ===
Grand Prize (Television)
**My Lovely Sam Soon**
Best Drama	Best Director (Television)
**Land**; Fashion 70's; Golden Apple; My Lovely Sam Soon; My Rosy Life	**Kim Jong-chang** - **My Rosy Life**; Kim Yoon-cheol - My Lovely Sam Soon; Lee Jong-han - Land
Best Educational Program	Best Entertainment Program
**나는 가요,도쿄 제2의 여름학교**	**Sang Sang Plus**
Best Actor (Television)	Best Actress (Television)
**Kim Joo-hyuk** - **Lovers in Prague**; Son Hyun-joo - My Rosy Life; Uhm Tae-woong - Resurrection	**Choi Jin-sil** - **My Rosy Life**; Kim Hyun-joo - Land; Kim Sun-a - My Lovely Sam Soon
Best New Actor (Television)	Best New Actress (Television)
**Chun Jung-myung** - **Fashion 70's**; Ju Ji-hoon - Princess Hours; Kang Ji-hwan - Be Strong, Geum-soon!	**Lee Young-ah** - **Golden Apple**; Nam Sang-mi - Sweet Spy; Yoon Eun-hye - Princess Hours
Best New Director (Television)	Best Screenplay (Television)
**Kim Kyu-tae** - **A Love to Kill**; Im Tae-woo - 5th Republic; Yoo In-shik - Bad Housewife	**Kim Do-woo** - **My Lovely Sam Soon**; Lee Jung-sun - Be Strong, Geum-soon!; Moon Young-nam - My Rosy Life
Best Variety Performer - Male	Best Variety Performer - Female
**Yoo Jae-suk** - **Good Sunday**	**Kim Shin-young** - **People Looking for a Laugh**
Most Popular - Actor (Television)	Most Popular - Actress (Television)
**Jo Hyun-jae** - **Ballad of Seodong**	**Hyun Young** - **Bad Family**
