= Choi Ji-na =

South Korean actress (born 1975)

- Born: May 17, 1975 (age 51); South Korea
- Education: Hanyang Women's University – Applied Art
- Occupation: Actress
- Years active: 1995–present
- Spouse: Ryu Young-geun (m. 2008)

Korean name
- Hangul: 최지나
- Hanja: 崔智娜
- RR: Choe Jina
- MR: Ch'oe China

Choi Ji-na (Korean: 최지나; born May 17, 1975) is a South Korean actress. She made her acting debut in 1995, and became best known as a supporting actress in television dramas, notably My Rosy Life (2005), A Happy Woman (2008), and My Too Perfect Sons (2009). In 2005, Choi received a Best Supporting Actress nomination at the Korean Film Awards for her portrayal of a shaman in Blood Rain.

== Filmography ==
=== Television series ===
Year	Title	Role	Notes
1995	Country Diaries		
1995	Woman	Bank Teller	
1995	Food Terminal	Female Reporter	
1995	Truth		
1996	Stars	Nurse	
1996	Dangerous Love		
1996	Salted Mackerel		
1996	Jo Gwang-jo		
1997	Sea of Ambition	Myung-sook	
1997	LA Arirang		
1998	My Love by My Side	So-young	
1999	Follow Your Dreams	Math Teacher	
2000	Three Friends		
2000	Song-hwa		
2001	The Jewelry Box in My Heart		
2001	Orient Theatre	Yoo Soon-ok	
2004	There's Light at the Tip of My Fingernails	Student in local Confucian academy	
2004	Drama City	Kang So-na	Episode "So-na's Beautiful Bakery"
2004	Age of Heroes	Choi Myeong-hee	
2005	My Rosy Life	Hong Jang-mi	
2006	Special of My Life	Park Kang-ho's wife	
2007	A Happy Woman	Moon Sun-young	
2007	Fly High	Cha Mi-ri	
2008	My Ex-wife Lives Next Door	Joo In-young	
2008	I Am Happy	Ha-kyung	
2009	The Slingshot	Madam Jang	
2009	My Too Perfect Sons	Kim Hye-rim	
2009	Temptation of an Angel	Jung Sang-ah/Julie Jung	
2010	The King of Legend	Seok Rahae	
2011	Insu, the Queen Mother	Yang Hyebin	
2011	HDTV Literature	Eom Ji-ne	Episode "Eom Ji-ne"
2012	Can't Live Without You	Hyun-seo	
2013	Goddess of Fire	Yeon-ok	
2013	The Heirs	Yoo Kyung-ran	
2014	Endless Love	Jin Yang-ja	
2014	Gunman in Joseon	Park Jin-han's wife	
2014	KBS TV Novel: Single-minded Dandelion	Yoon Jung-im	
2015	Insooni's Talk Drama	Kim Ja-ok	Episode "You Are a Flower"
2016	Bring It On, Ghost	Seo Jeong-geum	cameo, episode 7 and 11
2016	The Gentlemen of Wolgyesu Tailor Shop	Oh Young-eun	
2017	The Emperor: Owner of the Mask	Lady Yong-bin	
2018	Tempted	Kwon Shi Hyun's mother	
2018	Rich Man	Jung Young-suk	
2018	100 Days My Prince	Lee Yul's mother	cameo, episode 1

=== Film ===
Year	Title	Role
2000	Spooky School	
2004	Shit Up!	Soon-young
2005	Blood Rain	Manshin
2007	Hwang Jin Yi	Hyun-geum (cameo)
2009	Good Morning President	Waltz teacher

== Theater ==
Year	Title	Role
1998	The Glass Menagerie	

== Awards and nominations ==
Year	Award	Category	Nominated work	Result
2005	4th Korean Film Awards	Best Supporting Actress	Blood Rain	Nominated
