= Welcome to Dongmakgol =

2005 film by Park Gwang-hyun

- Theatrical release poster
- Hangul: 웰컴 투 동막골
- RR: Welkeom tu Dongmakgol
- MR: Welk'ŏm t'u Tongmakkol
- Directed by: Park Kwang-hyun
- Written by: Jang Jin; Park Kwang-hyun; Kim Joong
- Produced by: Jang Jin; Lee Eun-ha; Ji Sang-yong
- Starring: Jung Jae-young; Shin Ha-kyun; Kang Hye-jung
- Cinematography: Choi Sang-ho
- Edited by: Steve M. Choe
- Music by: Joe Hisaishi
- Distributed by: Showbox
- Release date: August 4, 2005
- Running time: 133 minutes
- Country: South Korea
- Language: Korean
- Budget: US$8 million
- Box office: US$31.8 million

Welcome to Dongmakgol (Korean: 웰컴 투 동막골), also known as Battle Ground 625 (UK), is a 2005 South Korean war comedy-drama film. Based on the same-titled long-running stage play by filmmaker/playwright Jang Jin, Park Kwang-hyun's debut film was a commercial and critical success.

The story is set in Korea during the Korean War in 1950. Soldiers from both the North and South, as well as an American pilot, find themselves in a secluded village, its residents largely unaware of the outside world, including the war.

It was South Korea's official entry for the foreign language film category of the Academy Awards in 2005, and at the time the fourth highest grossing South Korean film of all time.

== Plot ==
In September 1950, during the Korean War, U.S. Navy pilot Neil Smith (Steve Taschler) is caught in a mysterious storm of butterflies and crash-lands his plane in a remote and mountainous part of Korea. He is found by villagers from the nearby mountain village of Dongmakgol, who nurse him back to health. Dongmakgol is cut off from the outside world and its inhabitants have no knowledge of modern technology or of the massive conflict raging around them.

Meanwhile, a nearby platoon of North Korean soldiers is ambushed by a South Korean unit, leaving most of the North Koreans dead. Three surviving North Korean soldiers — Rhee Soo-hwa (Jung Jae-young), Jang Young-hee (Im Ha-ryong), and Seo Taek-gi (Ryu Deok-hwan) — manage to escape through a mountain passage and are found by Yeo-il (Kang Hye-jung), an absent-minded girl from Dongmakgol. Yeo-il leads them to the village where, to the North Koreans' alarm, they find two South Korean soldiers, Pyo Hyun-chul (Shin Ha-kyun) and Moon Sang-sang (Seo Jae-kyung), both of whom had deserted their units and had also been led to Dongmakgol by another villager.

The unexpected encounter triggers a Mexican standoff. Initially, the villagers are rounded up between the North and South Koreans, but they slowly drift away to go about their own business as the night passes into morning (being largely unaffected or bemused by the soldiers' actions). During a bout of rain, Yeo-il gleefully pulls out the pin from a grenade held by Taek-gi (mistaking it for a ring), sending the soldiers into further panic.

After an indeterminate amount of time, Taek-gi, worn by fatigue, accidentally drops his (now-armed) grenade; the grenade fails to explode despite initial panic from the soldiers. Believing it to be a dud, Hyun-chul discards the grenade behind him into the village storehouse. It then explodes, incinerating the village's entire stockpile of corn. The remnants fall down from the sky, surrealistically, as popcorn.

The North and South Korean soldiers, realising that their quarrel has condemned the village to starvation in the upcoming winter, reluctantly agree to a truce and divert their efforts to making up for the damage they have caused. Together, they undertake work across the village and help harvest potatoes in the fields. During a day of fieldwork, the soldiers work together to kill a wild boar attacking the villagers, which the apparently-vegetarian villagers then bury without eating, much to the annoyance of the soldiers. That night, the North Korean soldiers, South Korean soldiers and Smith separately sneak out at night to dig up and roast the boar, leading to an unplanned communal meal that loosens the tension between the soldiers.

Meanwhile, Allied commanders, having lost several other planes in the area, prepare a rescue team to recover Smith, who they mistakenly believe is being held at a hidden North Korean mountain base. They plan to rescue and extract Smith, with an aerial bomb strike to take place at the location 24 hours after extraction mission to destroy the anti-aircraft guns presumably located there.

The rescue team drops in by parachute at night but suffer heavy casualties after being swarmed by a torrent of butterflies in the air, with further casualties from the rough terrain. The rescue team enter the village (which is holding a harvest feast), and, assuming it is a cover for an enemy base, begin interrogating, threatening and harassing the villagers, in particular the village chief. The rough treatment of the villagers ignites a heated response from the North and South Korean soldiers; the ensuing scuffle and firefight kills every member of the rescue team but one (a Korean translator), with Yeo-il fatally wounded in the crossfire.

Through the translator, the villagers find out about the bombing plan. The North and South Korean soldiers, realising that the village is in peril, decide to create a decoy base away from the village, using lamps from the village and equipment salvaged from a nearby crashed supply plane discovered by Smith. They plan to engage the unit with rigged guns and minimal fire with the goal of drawing the unit's attention and inciting a bomb strike of the decoy base, with the soldiers fleeing to safety. Smith is sent along with the translator to the Allied forces to dissuade any further bomb strikes at Dongmakgol's location. While preparing to engage the unit, Taek-gi encourages the group and quips that they, being a joint North-South troop, are "Allies" as well.

As the bombing unit flies overhead, the soldiers' initial limited gunfire fails to draw their attention, requiring the Korean soldiers to stay put and engage the unit with more intense fire and weaponry. Although the decoy is successful, the soldiers are unable to flee to safety, with Young-hee and Sang-sang gunned down during the initial engagement. The remaining Korean soldiers, who keep to their posts, are then wiped out by a blanket of bombs.

The next morning, butterflies appear where the Korean soldiers died, which then join a swarm fluttering overhead.

== Cast ==
- Jung Jae-young: North Korean sergeant Rhee Su-hwa
- Shin Ha-kyun: Pyo Hyeon-cheol
- Kang Hye-jung: Yeo-il
- Im Ha-ryong: North Korean staff sergeant Jang Young-hee
- Seo Jae-kyung: Mun Sang-sang
- Ryu Deok-hwan: Seo Taek-gi
- Steve Taschler: Smith
- Jeong Jae-jin: village headman
- Lee Yong-yi: One's old mother
- Park Nam-hee: head of the village
- Jo Deok-hyun: Mr. Kim
- Yoo Seung-mok: A male
- Shim Won-cheol: Seok-Yong
- Kang Hyun-joong: Eungsik
- Ri-min: Yongbong
- Kwon O-min: Dong-gu
- Hong Ye-in: Dong-gu's mom
- Ha Sung-kwang: Villager
- Yoon Hee-won: Special forces member 1
- Shin Hyun-seung: Villager
- Jeong Dae-hoon: Young Injured (cameo)

== Production ==
Having been impressed by Park Kwang-hyun's 2002 short film My Nike, Film It Suda CEO Jang Jin gave him a new project: to direct an adaptation of one of Jang's successful stage plays called Welcome to Dongmakgol. The final script was the result of 18 months of brainstorming between Jang, Park, and visual supervisor Kim Joong.

The film was originally budgeted for around ₩4 billion, as there were no big stars (mostly actors acquainted with Jang or affiliated with Film It Suda). However, filming and post-production CGI took much longer than expected, and the budget skyrocketed to ₩8 billion, putting Jang's company in trouble: for a small production company like Film It Suda failing with this film would have been catastrophic.

Park had been a big fan of Japanese animation director Hayao Miyazaki's work since he watched Future Boy Conan as a child. One of Miyazaki's most important collaborators was composer Joe Hisaishi. Park liked Hisaishi's music so much that he wrote the script thinking about his music, visualizing the scenes in his mind while listening to his past work. During pre-production, producer Lee Eun-ha asked Park who the best music director for the project would be; Park immediately answered, "Joe Hisaishi." Lee then wrote a very heartfelt letter to Hisaishi, explaining their situation and translating the script into Japanese for Hisaishi's consideration. Hisaishi accepted the proposal, later stating that he was moved by the enthusiasm and sincerity in the letter, choosing Welcome to Dongmakgol as his first ever Korean film.

== Reception ==
On the review aggregator website Rotten Tomatoes, 88% of 8 critics' reviews are positive.

== Awards and nominations ==
Awards and nominations
Year	Group	Category	Recipient	Result
2005	26th Blue Dragon Film Awards	Best Film	Welcome to Dongmakgol	Nominated
2005	26th Blue Dragon Film Awards	Best Supporting Actor	Im Ha-ryong	Won
2005	26th Blue Dragon Film Awards	Best Supporting Actress	Kang Hye-jung	Won
2005	26th Blue Dragon Film Awards	Best New Director	Park Kwang-hyun	Nominated
2005	26th Blue Dragon Film Awards	Best Screenplay	Jang Jin, Park Kwang-hyun, Kim Joong	Nominated
2005	26th Blue Dragon Film Awards	Best Art Direction	Lee Joon-seung	Nominated
2005	26th Blue Dragon Film Awards	Best Music	Joe Hisaishi	Nominated
2005	26th Blue Dragon Film Awards	Technical Award	Jo Yi-seok (CG)	Nominated
2005	26th Blue Dragon Film Awards	Audience Choice Award for Most Popular Film	Welcome to Dongmakgol	Won
2005	4th Korean Film Awards	Best Film	Welcome to Dongmakgol	Won
2005	4th Korean Film Awards	Best Director	Park Kwang-hyun	Won
2005	4th Korean Film Awards	Best Actor	Jung Jae-young	Nominated
2005	4th Korean Film Awards	Best Supporting Actor	Im Ha-ryong	Nominated
2005	4th Korean Film Awards	Best Supporting Actress	Kang Hye-jung	Won
2005	4th Korean Film Awards	Best New Director	Park Kwang-hyun	Won
2005	4th Korean Film Awards	Best New Actor	Ryu Deok-hwan	Nominated
2005	4th Korean Film Awards	Best Screenplay	Jang Jin, Park Kwang-hyun, Kim Joong	Won
2005	4th Korean Film Awards	Best Cinematography	Choi Sang-ho	Nominated
2005	4th Korean Film Awards	Best Editing	Steve M. Choe	Nominated
2005	4th Korean Film Awards	Best Music	Joe Hisaishi	Won
2005	4th Korean Film Awards	Best Visual Effects	Jo Yi-seok	Nominated
2005	8th Director's Cut Awards	Best Actor	Jung Jae-young	Won
2006	42nd Baeksang Arts Awards	Best New Director	Park Kwang-hyun	Nominated
2006	43rd Grand Bell Awards	Best Film	Welcome to Dongmakgol	Nominated
2006	43rd Grand Bell Awards	Best Supporting Actor	Im Ha-ryong	Nominated
2006	43rd Grand Bell Awards	Best Supporting Actress	Kang Hye-jung	Won
2006	43rd Grand Bell Awards	Best New Director	Park Kwang-hyun	Nominated
2006	43rd Grand Bell Awards	Best Screenplay	Jang Jin, Park Kwang-hyun, Kim Joong	Nominated
2006	43rd Grand Bell Awards	Best Music	Joe Hisaishi	Nominated
2006	43rd Grand Bell Awards	Best Visual Effects	Jo Yi-seok, Kim Yong-gwan, Min Chi-soon	Nominated
2006	43rd Grand Bell Awards	Best Sound	Hwang Su-yeon, Sung Su-ah, Kim Suk-won	Nominated
2006	43rd Grand Bell Awards	Best Planning	Film It Suda	Nominated

== See also ==
- The Cuckoo (film)
