= The Windmill Palm Grove =

- Directed by: Jonathan Yu
- Screenplay by: Jonathan Yu
- Starring: Kim Min-jong; Kim Yoo-mi
- Release date: September 15, 2005 (South Korea)
- Running time: 108 minutes
- Country: South Korea
- Language: Korean

The Windmill Palm Grove (Korean: 종려나무숲; RR: Jongnyeonamusup) is a 2005 South Korean melodrama film starring Kim Min-jong and Kim Yoo-mi, and written and directed by Jonathan Yu.

== Plot ==
The film follows a framed narrative. Kim In-seo, a successful lawyer, travels by bus to Gangneung for a lecture. He is followed by Choi Sung-joo, a woman he met on a blind date the previous night. Intrigued by her persistence, In-seo shares a painful love story from his past.

Two years earlier, In-seo is sent to a shipyard on Geoje Island as a patent attorney. There, he meets Hwa-yeon, a tough transporter worker at the shipyard, and falls in love with her. He lightly proposes a casual one-year relationship, which deeply hurts Hwa-yeon. After getting drunk at a company dinner, In-seo helps her home, which is located in a secluded area on Gonggoji hill surrounded by a grove of windmill palms.

At her home, In-seo discovers three generations of women living together: Hwa-yeon, her grandmother Shim Bong-ae, and her paralyzed mother, Jung-soon. He learns the history of the grove: decades ago, a deep-sea fishing boat captain named Choi stayed at their house after a storm and left a small windmill palm tree with Jung-soon, promising to return. He never came back, and Jung-soon spent her entire life waiting for him, while the single tree grew into a massive forest.

Traumatized by her mother and grandmother's lives spent waiting for false promises, Hwa-yeon harbors a deep resentment toward the grove. Because of this trauma, she rejects In-seo when he later professes his genuine love and proposes marriage. Overwhelmed by her emotional barriers, In-seo ultimately leaves the island and returns to Seoul.

Back in the present, Sung-joo reveals a shocking truth to In-seo: she is the daughter of Captain Choi. She tells him that her father never forgot Jung-soon, but was unable to return due to an accident at sea, and passed away while longing for the windmill palm grove. Deeply moved by this revelation, In-seo realizes the sincerity of his feelings and decides to return to Geoje Island to reunite with Hwa-yeon.

== Cast ==
- Kim Min-jong as Kim In-seo
- Kim Yoo-mi as Hwa-yeon/Jung-soon
- Jo Eun-sook as Shim Bong-ae
- Kim Yeong-gi as Sang-bong, Jung-soon's father
- Lee Ah-hyun as Choi Sung-joo
- Lee Geung-young as Deep-sea fishing boat captain Choi

== Awards and nominations ==
Year	Award	Category	Recipient	Result
2006	42nd Baeksang Arts Awards	Best New Actress (Film)	Kim Yoo-mi	Nominated
