= Ghost Sweepers =

- Hangul: 점쟁이들
- RR: Jeomjaengideul
- MR: Chŏmjaengidŭl
- Directed by: Shin Jung-won
- Screenplay by: Kwon Seong-hwi
- Story by: Ji Jin-hee
- Produced by: Kim Hyeon-seok; Lee So-yeong; Jang Won-seok
- Starring: Kim Soo-ro; Kang Ye-won; Lee Je-hoon; Kwak Do-won; Kim Yoon-hye
- Cinematography: Seong Seung-taek
- Edited by: Kim Chang-ju
- Music by: Kim Tae-seong
- Production companies: Dasepo Club; Saram Entertainment
- Distributed by: Next Entertainment World
- Release date: October 3, 2012
- Running time: 107 minutes
- Country: South Korea
- Language: Korean
- Box office: US$6 million

Ghost Sweepers (Korean: 점쟁이들; also known as The Fortune Tellers) is a 2012 South Korean comedy horror film about a group of shamans from across the nation who gather together for a grand exorcism at a small village notorious for dark spirits, as a young journalist gets sent to cover the story.

== Plot ==
The village of Uljinri has been plagued by evil for decades. When mysterious accidents and events keep happening without avail, shamans from all over the country gather to hold a shaman ritual, and Chan-young, a young newspaper reporter is sent to cover the story.

The group of shamans begins their grand ritual, but with the strange eerie force that dominates the entire village and repeated attacks by the spirits, most of the shamans run for their lives. Only the five best shamans remain: Teacher Park, the most famous "star fortune teller" who gets paid for performing exorcisms around the country; Monk Shim-in, who studied with him under the same master but is now telling sundry couple's fortunes around old Tabgol Park; Suk-hyun who has a doctorate in engineering and makes all kinds of demon-chasing equipment; a boy named Wol-kwang, who has the power to see into the near future; and Seung-hee who is skilled at tarot cards and can see the memories stored in all objects. Along with Chan-young, the six begin to explore the dark secrets of the village while preparing for the biggest battle against the evil forces.

== Cast ==
- Kim Soo-ro - Teacher Park
- Kang Ye-won - Chan-young
- Lee Je-hoon - Suk-hyun
- Kwak Do-won - Monk Shim-in
- Kim Yoon-hye (formerly Woori) - Seung-hee
- Yang Kyung-mo - Wol-kwang
- Lee Byung-joon - Ko-san
- Kim Gi-cheon - Teacher Choong-ryeol
- Lee Sang-hee - village foreman
- Lee Jun-hyeok - killer
- Jung Yoon-min - Mr. Kim
- Go Seo-hee - Female shaman Poonghyangryoo
- Bang Joon-seo - young Chan-young
- Jin Yong-ok - editor
- Kim Ji-hoon - Il-kwang
- Kim Min-kyo - police officer in Uljin
- Lee Mi-do - Joon-kyung (cameo)
- Choi Won-young - Choi Seung-woo (cameo)
- Kim Tae-hoon - young male ghost (cameo)
- Jeremy Lowe - Father Bob
