= Queen of the Night (2013 film) =

2013 film directed by Kim Če-jong

- Theatrical poster
- Hangul: 밤의 여왕
- Hanja: 밤의 女王
- RR: Bamui yeowang
- MR: Pamŭi yŏwang
- Directed by: Kim Je-yeong
- Written by: Kim Ji-yeong
- Produced by: Jeon Ho-jin
- Starring: Kim Min-jung; Chun Jung-myung
- Cinematography: Choi Ju-yeong
- Edited by: Shin Min-kyung
- Music by: Hwang Seong-je
- Production company: I-vision
- Distributed by: Invent D
- Release date: October 17, 2013
- Running time: 113 minutes
- Country: South Korea
- Language: Korean

Queen of the Night (Korean: 밤의 여왕) is a 2013 South Korean romantic comedy film starring Kim Min-jung and Chun Jung-myung. It was written and directed by Kim Je-yeong.

== Plot ==
Young-soo is a nerdy, timid man without any interest in women until he meets Hee-joo in a sandwich store one day. They get married and at first, the couple settles into a happy marriage. But three years later when by chance, at the reunion for his university class, the allure of winning a kimchi-fridge for her mother-in-law makes her dance a super-sexy show, the shockingly surprised Young-soo begins to doubt his seemingly perfect wife and does some digging into her past. To his dismay he discovers plenty of evidence that her past isn't as pristine as he thought. This begins to deepen the question of how this nerdy computer technician with ordinary looks and no social skills could have married such a beautiful woman who seems happily content as a sort of Stepford Wife male fantasy, the perfect virgin/whore who submissively cleans his ears but surprises him one night in a Naughty Nurse outfit and then plays it out.

== Cast ==
- Kim Min-jung as Hee-joo
- Chun Jung-myung as Young-soo
- Kim Ki-bang as Jong-bae
- Lee Mi-do as Jeong-tae's mother
- Lee Joo-won as Moon-sook
- Ji Dae-han as Union leader
- Han Bo-reum as Jang-mi
- Yoon Jin-ha as MC
- Jeong Min-jin as Seong-woo
- Kang Seong-ho as Team leader Park
- Kim Ah-mi as Anna
- Jeong Yong-hee as Newcomer
- Noh Kang-min as Jeong-tae
- Yoo Jae-sang as young Young-soo
- Nam Tae-boo as young Seong-woo
- Kahlid Elijah Tapia as Gunman #1
- Han Jung-soo as Eden (cameo)
- Kim Sung-eun as Ji-eun (cameo)
- Yoo In-young as Young-soo's blind date (cameo)
- Kim Byeong-ok as Drunk at police station (cameo)
- Kim Jung-tae as Gynecologist (cameo)
- Bae Seong-woo as Security team leader (cameo)
- Park Jin-young as Locksmith (cameo)
