= Blood Rain (film) =

- Theatrical poster
- Hangul: 혈의 누
- Hanja: 血의 淚
- RR: Hyeorui nu
- MR: Hyŏrŭi nu
- Directed by: Kim Dae-seung
- Written by: Lee Won-jae; Kim Seong-je
- Produced by: Kim Mi-hee
- Starring: Cha Seung-won; Park Yong-woo; Ji Sung; Yoon Se-ah; Choi Ji-na; Oh Hyun-kyung; Choi Jong-won; Chun Ho-jin
- Cinematography: Choi Young-hwan
- Edited by: Kim Sang-bum; Kim Jae-bum
- Music by: Jo Yeong-wook
- Distributed by: Cinema Service
- Release date: May 4, 2005 (South Korea)
- Running time: 119 minutes
- Country: South Korea
- Language: Korean
- Box office: US$14,270,938

Blood Rain (Korean: 혈의 누; RR: Hyeorui nu) is a 2005 South Korean period mystery thriller film. A murder mystery set in 1808, it touches on historical prejudice against Roman Catholicism in the Joseon Kingdom. Although primarily a period thriller, director Kim Dae-seung weaves together an unconventional mix of styles—a puzzle-box mystery plot traditionally associated with detective fiction, class-conscious social commentary, lush cinematography, sets and costume design, and a flair for gore.

== Plot ==
It is 1808 on Donghwa Island, a small island with a technologically advanced paper mill. The presence of the mill has spawned a bustling village, and given its townspeople a certain degree of wealth. With climate and trees perfectly suited for papermaking—and a location remote enough to ensure both privacy and secrecy—the island has established a profitable business in high quality paper, with trade routes stretching as far away as China.

This isolated and largely autonomous island begins to be plagued by a string of gruesome murders. However, it's not just the mounting death toll that is causing residents to worry, but the sadistic, methodical way in which the victims were killed. With the killer still on the loose, the government sends in special investigator Wonkyu to crack the case. While conducting his dogged investigation, he soon uncovers myriad hidden secrets, tracing the murders back to an incident that occurred some seven years earlier, in which the former owner of the mill was executed for practicing Catholicism. The townspeople, for their part, are convinced that the dead man's ghost has come back for revenge. As the young officer digs deeper into the island's dark past, Wonkyu discovers that there may be something even more frightening than the murders or the murderer—a truth that will make him question the depths of human nature.

== Cast ==
- Cha Seung-won as Wonkyu
- Park Yong-woo as In-kwon
- Ji Sung as Du-ho
- Yoon Se-ah as So-yeon
- Choi Ji-na as Manshin
- Oh Hyun-kyung as Kim Chi-sung
- Choi Jong-won as Royal emissary Choi
- Chun Ho-jin as Commission agent Kang

== Awards and nominations ==
2005 Chunsa Film Art Awards

- Best Film
- Best Director – Kim Dae-seung
- Best Supporting Actor – Park Yong-woo
- Best Cinematography – Choi Young-hwan
- Best Editing – Kim Sang-bum, Kim Jae-bum
- Best Lighting – Kim Sung-kwan
- Technical Award – Shin Jae-ho

2005 Grand Bell Awards

- Best Art Direction – Min Eon-ok
- Best Costume Design – Jung Kyung-hee
- Nomination – Best Film
- Nomination – Best Director – Kim Dae-seung
- Nomination – Best Supporting Actor – Park Yong-woo
- Nomination – Best Original Screenplay – Lee Won-jae
- Nomination – Best Cinematography – Choi Young-hwan
- Nomination – Best Editing – Kim Sang-bum, Kim Jae-bum
- Nomination – Best Lighting – Kim Sung-kwan
- Nomination – Best Planning – Kim Mi-hee
- Nomination – Best Visual Effects – Han Tae-jeong (Insight Visual), Jeong Do-an (Demolition), Shin Jae-ho (Mage)

2005 Blue Dragon Film Awards

- Technical Award – Shin Jae-ho (Special Make-up Effects)
- Nomination – Best Film
- Nomination – Best Director – Kim Dae-seung
- Nomination – Best Supporting Actor – Park Yong-woo
- Nomination – Best Cinematography – Choi Young-hwan
- Nomination – Best Lighting – Kim Sung-kwan
- Nomination – Best Art Direction – Min Eon-ok

2005 Korean Film Awards

- Best Supporting Actor – Park Yong-woo
- Best Art Direction – Min Eon-ok
- Best Visual Effects – Shin Jae-ho
- Best Sound – Kim Suk-won, Kim Chang-seop
- Nomination – Best Director – Kim Dae-seung
- Nomination – Best Supporting Actress – Choi Ji-na
- Nomination – Best New Actress – Yoon Se-ah
- Nomination – Best Screenplay – Lee Won-jae
- Nomination – Best Cinematography – Choi Young-hwan
- Nomination – Best Music – Jo Yeong-wook

2006 Yubari International Fantastic Film Festival

- Grand Prize

2006 Baeksang Arts Awards

- Best Film
- Nomination – Best Actor – Cha Seung-won
- Nomination – Best Screenplay – Lee Won-jae

2006 Brisbane International Film Festival

- NETPAC Award
