= Steel Cold Winter =

- Theatrical poster
- Directed by: Choi Jin-sung
- Written by: Choi Yoon-jin
- Produced by: Kim Kwan-hun
- Starring: Kim Yoon-hye; Kim Shi-hoo
- Music by: Kim Tae-seong
- Production companies: Vanguard Studio; Film Blossom
- Distributed by: CJ Entertainment
- Release dates: October 4, 2013 (Busan International Film Festival); November 7, 2013 (South Korea)
- Running time: 109 minutes
- Country: South Korea
- Language: Korean

Steel Cold Winter (Korean: 소녀; RR: Sonyeo; lit. 'Girl') is a 2013 South Korean romance thriller film starring Kim Yoon-hye and Kim Shi-hoo. Directed by Choi Jin-sung, it premiered in the New Currents section of the 18th Busan International Film Festival and was released in theaters on November 7, 2013.

== Plot ==
Yoon-soo was once a student at one of the best high schools in Seoul, but a trivial remark he made turns into a vicious rumor that leads his friend to commit suicide. Unable to bear the guilt, Yoon-soo attempts to kill himself. To help him recover, his family moves to Ijeon-li, a snow-covered village on a mountain. On the day of the move, Yoon-soo sees a mysterious young girl skating by herself on the frozen lake. Having started school in this small, rural town, Yoon-soo slowly finds peace within. Despite the villagers' kindness and his peers' ongoing fascination with him as a cool guy from the city, he keeps to himself. There is, however, one girl who gets Yoon-soo's attention: the class outcast Hae-won. The aloof Hae-won, who lives alone with her mentally disabled father, is viewed as a pariah by the entire village and constantly at the center of the townsfolk's gossip. As if seeing himself in her, he offers her sympathy and warmth, and Hae-won slowly opens up to him, feeling that he's the only one who understands and accepts her. But soon, Yoon-soo also becomes consumed by the brutal rumors surrounding Hae-won.

== Cast ==
- Kim Si-hoo as Seo Yoon-soo
- Kim Yoon-hye as Eun Hae-won
- Moon Chang-gil as Yang Yi-chang (village foreman)
- Lee Jang-yoo as Duk-man
- Jo Han-chul as Doctor
- Woo Jung-gook as Kim Soon-kyung
- Park Jin-woo as Man-suk
- Yoon Kyung-ho as Teacher
- Jung Doo-gyum as Seo Yoon-soo's father
- Joo Yoo-rang as Seo Yoon-soo's mother
- Park So-dam as Ji-yeon
- Jang In-sub as Young-jae
- Oh Hee-joon as Hyung-joon
- Kim Kwang-seop as Kwang-seop
- Lee Tae-hee as Young-joon
- Chun Jung-ha as Young-joon's mother
- Heo Tae-kyung as Yang Yi-chang's wife
- Han Hee-jung as Seoul School home room teacher
- Seo Hyun-woo as Math teacher
- Jung In-gi as Myung-kwan (cameo)
- Gi Ju-bong as Young-joon's father (cameo)
