= Chun Jung-myung =

South Korean actor (born 1980)

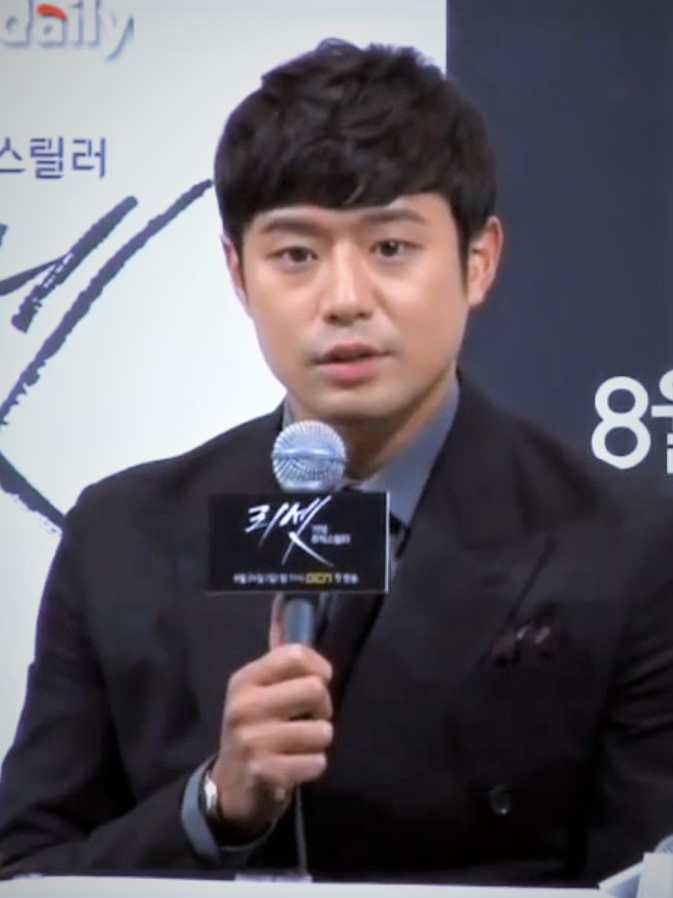
- Chun in August 2014
- Born: November 29, 1980 (age 45); Seoul, South Korea
- Education: Sangji University - B.A. and M.A. in Physical Education
- Occupation: Actor
- Years active: 1997–present
- Agent: KJ Company

Korean name
- Hangul: 천정명
- Hanja: 千正明
- RR: Cheon Jeongmyeong
- MR: Ch'ŏn Chŏngmyŏng

Chun Jung-myung (Korean: 천정명, born November 29, 1980) is a South Korean actor. Chun made his break into the entertainment industry in the KBS teen drama School 2 (1999). He is best known for his leading roles in TV dramas such as Fashion 70's (2005), Goodbye Solo (2006), What's Up Fox? (2006), Cinderella's Sister (2010), The Duo, Glory Jane (2011), Reset (2014), Heart to Heart (2015), and The Master of Revenge (2016).

He also starred in the films The Aggressives (2005), Les Formidables (2006), Hansel and Gretel (2007), and Queen of the Night (2013).

Chun started his own management company in 2011. Since the early 2010's, Chun has trained Brazilian Jiu Jitsu and is a purple belt under John Frankl. In his Instagram post last June 2022, the actor shared that he has attained the black belt in Jiu Jitsu, after 11 years of hardwork.

== Filmography ==
=== Television series ===
Year	Title	Role	Network
1999	School 2	Student in photography club (episode 21)	KBS1
2000	Echo		SBS
2001	Nonstop	teenage Pyeon	MBC
2001	Open Drama Man & Woman: Pure Flower Cafe	Park Hong-tae	SBS
2001	Third Coincidence	Song Ji-chul	MBC
2002	MBC Best Theater: Han-ip's Woman	Bong-soo	MBC
2002	Bad Girls	Cheong-mok	SBS
2002	Honest Living	Chun Jung-myung	SBS
2004	Beijing, My Love	Noh Wan-sung	KBS2
2004	Drama City: I Love H, He, Li...	Lee Sang-gyu	KBS2
2005	Fashion 70s	Jang Bin	SBS
2006	Goodbye Solo	Kim Min-ho	KBS2
2006	What's Up Fox?	Park Chul-soo	MBC
2010	Cinderella's Stepsister	Hong Ki-hoon	KBS2
2011	The Duo	Chun-doong	MBC
2011	Glory Jane	Kim Young-kwang	KBS2
2013	The Family		FJTV
2014	Reset	Cha Woo-jin	OCN
2015	Heart to Heart	Go Yi-seok	tvN
2016	The Master of Revenge	Moo Myung	KBS2
2018	Love Alert	Cha Woo-hyun	MBN/DramaX

=== Film ===
Year	Title	Role	Notes/Ref.
2002	R U Ready?	Bong Jun-gu	
2003	Dance Begins	Detective 1	short film
2004	Twentidentity	Train commuter	segment: "20 Questions"
2005	The Aggressives	So-yo	
2006	Les Formidables	Lee Soo-hyun	
2007	Hansel and Gretel	Lee Eun-soo	
2011	Hindsight	Ae-gu	
2013	Queen of the Night	Young-soo	
2014	O Sole Mio	voice	short film
2016	Life Risking Romance	Seol Rok-hwan	
2018	Faceless Boss	Kim Geon	
2020	Unalterable	Gwon Sang Gon	

=== Variety show ===
Year	Title	Network	Notes/Ref.
2014	Real Men	MBC	Cast member
2017	Night Goblin	JTBC	Cast member (Episode 9-19)
2019	Urban Cops (season 2)	MBC	Cast member

=== Music video appearances ===
Year	Song title	Artist
2001	"Haeyo"	Jung In-ho
2002	"For You, Goodbye"	Shin Seung-hun
2005	"My Heart's Treasure Box"	SG Wannabe
2005	"A Dreamy Conversation"	SG Wannabe
2005	"Although My Heart Aches"	Fly to the Sky (Fashion 70's OST)
2010	"It Has to Be You"	Yesung (Cinderella's Sister OST)

== Awards and nominations ==
Year	Award	Category	Nominated work	Result
1999	5th Storm Jeans Model Contest	Grand Prize	—N/a	Won
2005	6th Busan Film Critics Awards	Best New Actor	The Aggressives	Won
2005	26th Blue Dragon Film Awards	Best New Actor	The Aggressives	Won
2005	SBS Drama Awards	New Star Award	Fashion 70's	Won
2005	22nd Korea Best Dresser Swan Awards	Best Dressed, TV Actor category	Fashion 70's	Won
2006	42nd Baeksang Arts Awards	Best New Actor (TV)	Fashion 70's	Won
2006	42nd Baeksang Arts Awards	Best New Actor (Film)	The Aggressives	Nominated
2006	MBC Drama Awards	Excellence Award, Actor	What's Up Fox?	Nominated
2006	MBC Drama Awards	PD Award	What's Up Fox?	Won
2006	MBC Drama Awards	Popularity Award	What's Up Fox?	Nominated
2006	MBC Drama Awards	Best Couple Award with Go Hyun-jung	What's Up Fox?	Nominated
2006	KBS Drama Awards	Popularity Award	Goodbye Solo	Nominated
2006	KBS Drama Awards	Best Couple Award with Yoon So-yi	Goodbye Solo	Nominated
2007	2nd Asia Model Festival Awards	Popular Star Award	—N/a	Won
2010	4th Mnet 20's Choice Awards	Most Influential Star	Cinderella's Sister	Won
2010	3rd Style Icon Awards	Style Icon Actor	Cinderella's Sister	Won
2010	KBS Drama Awards	Excellence Award, Actor in a Mid-length Drama	Cinderella's Sister	Nominated
2010	KBS Drama Awards	Best Couple Award with Moon Geun-young	Cinderella's Sister	Nominated
2011	MBC Drama Awards	Excellence Award, Actor in a Miniseries	The Duo	Nominated
2011	KBS Drama Awards	Top Excellence Award, Actor	Glory Jane	Nominated
2011	KBS Drama Awards	Excellence Award, Actor in a Mid-length Drama	Glory Jane	Won
2011	KBS Drama Awards	Popularity Award	Glory Jane	Nominated
2011	KBS Drama Awards	Best Couple Award with Park Min-young	Glory Jane	Nominated
