= Park Kwang-hyun (film director) =

South Korean commercial and film director

Bae-jong
- 배종
- Born: Park Kwang-hyun; August 21, 1969 (age 57); Seoul, South Korea
- Education: Hongik University - Visual Design
- Occupations: Film director, commercial director
- Years active: 2002-present

Korean name
- Hangul: 박광현
- RR: Bak Gwanghyeon
- MR: Pak Kwanghyŏn

Pen name
- Hangul: 배종
- RR: Baejong
- MR: Paejong

Bae-jong (Korean: 배종; born Park Kwang-hyun on August 21, 1969) is a South Korean commercial and film director. He is best known for co-writing and directing the critical and commercial hit Welcome to Dongmakgol (2005).

== Early life ==
Park Kwang-hyun grew up in the countryside with his grandmother. When he was in primary school, he began watching his first films, like Superman and Robot Taekwon V, and fell in love with the art of cinema. He would talk about films with his friends all day, and go to the movie theater any chance he got.

== Career ==
For his college degree, Park studied Visual Design at Hongik University. After graduation, Park started his own company with a few friends, and went on to become one of the most acclaimed figures in the CF (Commercial Film) field. He shot several famous commercials with top stars, from Kyobo Life with Choi Min-sik, to the McDonald's "Don't bet your life" series with Shin Ha-kyun and Im Won-hee.

While going to work, he kept writing his own script, in the hope that one day it would turn into his first feature. Then, all of a sudden, he approached playwright/filmmaker Jang Jin in 2001, saying he was a fan and wanted him to read his script. Jang welcomed young Park into his production company Film It Suda, which featured mostly theater-trained actors and directors. He was the oddity in Jang's group, the sole "style man" out of all those people mostly concerned with dialogue and situation-based drama or comedy.

In 2002, Park directed My Nike (내 나이키), considered by critics to be the best short film in the Film It Suda omnibus No Comment (묻지마 패밀리). Told from the POV of a young junior high school student (Ryu Deok-hwan) from an urban lower-middle-class family, whose greatest desire in the world is to own a pair of Nike sneakers, its authentic but droll character observations remain surprisingly warm and touching. Underlying them is a sense of pathos about class differences based on consumption patterns of the '80s, when Korea was first becoming an out-and-out consumer society and its people were beginning to be defined by what they buy and own. My Nike had a sense of nostalgia, based on Park's own childhood memories as a teenager growing up in 1980s Korea and tinted with fantasy (with an homage to E.T.).

Jang Jin was so impressed with Park's cinematic humanism he gave him a script for a new project, an adaptation of one of his stage plays, Welcome to Dongmakgol. Set during the Korean War in 1950, soldiers from both the North and South, as well as an American pilot, find themselves in a secluded village, its residents largely unaware of the outside world. Park's first feature film Welcome to Dongmakgol attracted more than 8 million viewers in 2005, making it the second highest-grossing movie that year and among Korean box office's highest of all time.

Park's long-gestating second feature was originally titled Kwon Bob (권법), with Jo In-sung cast as a high school student with superhuman strength who battles injustice in a small town, but it was delayed when investor CJ Entertainment pulled out after the box office failure of Sector 7 in 2011. The project was revived in 2013, and the sci-fi fantasy blockbuster, retitled The Fist, is the largest Korea-China co-production yet with 30% of the US$20 million budget coming from the China Film Group and Pegasus & Taihe Entertainment.

== Filmography ==
=== Film ===
Year	Title		Credited as		
Year	English	Korean	Director	Writer	Producer
2005	Welcome to Dongmakgol	웰컴 투 동막골	Yes	Yes	No
2017	Fabricated City	조작된 도시	Yes	Yes	No

=== Short film ===
Year	Title		Credited as		
Year	English	Korean	Director	Writer	Producer
2002	No Comment — My Nike	묻지마 패밀리 — 내 나이키	Yes	No	No
2017	The Fist (2016)		Yes	No	No
2017	Spiderman	거미맨	Yes	No	No
2018	My Dream Class		Yes	No	No

=== Television ===
Year	Title		Role	Notes	Ref.
Year	English	Korean	Role	Notes	Ref.
2022–2023	Island	아일랜드	Director	Part 1–2	

== Awards and nominations ==
Awards and nominations
Year	Group	Category	Nominated work	Result
2002	New York Festival International Advertising Awards	Gold Medal	Park Kwang-hyun	Won
2002	Cannes Lions International Advertising Festival	Silver Lion, Fast Food category	Park Kwang-hyun	Won
2005	26th Blue Dragon Film Awards	Best Film	Welcome to Dongmakgol	Nominated
2005	26th Blue Dragon Film Awards	Best New Director	Welcome to Dongmakgol	Nominated
2005	26th Blue Dragon Film Awards	Best Screenplay	Welcome to Dongmakgol	Nominated
2005	26th Blue Dragon Film Awards	Audience Choice Award for Most Popular Film	Welcome to Dongmakgol	Won
2005	4th Korean Film Awards	Best Film	Welcome to Dongmakgol	Won
2005	4th Korean Film Awards	Best Director	Welcome to Dongmakgol	Won
2005	4th Korean Film Awards	Best New Director	Welcome to Dongmakgol	Won
2005	4th Korean Film Awards	Best Screenplay	Welcome to Dongmakgol	Won
2006	42nd Baeksang Arts Awards	Best New Director	Welcome to Dongmakgol	Nominated
2006	29th Golden Cinematography Awards	Best New Director	Welcome to Dongmakgol	Won
2006	43rd Grand Bell Awards	Best Film	Welcome to Dongmakgol	Nominated
2006	43rd Grand Bell Awards	Best New Director	Welcome to Dongmakgol	Nominated
2006	43rd Grand Bell Awards	Best Screenplay (Note: Jang Jin, Park Kwang-hyun, and Kim Joong)	Welcome to Dongmakgol	Nominated
