= Im Ha-ryong =

South Korean actor and comedian

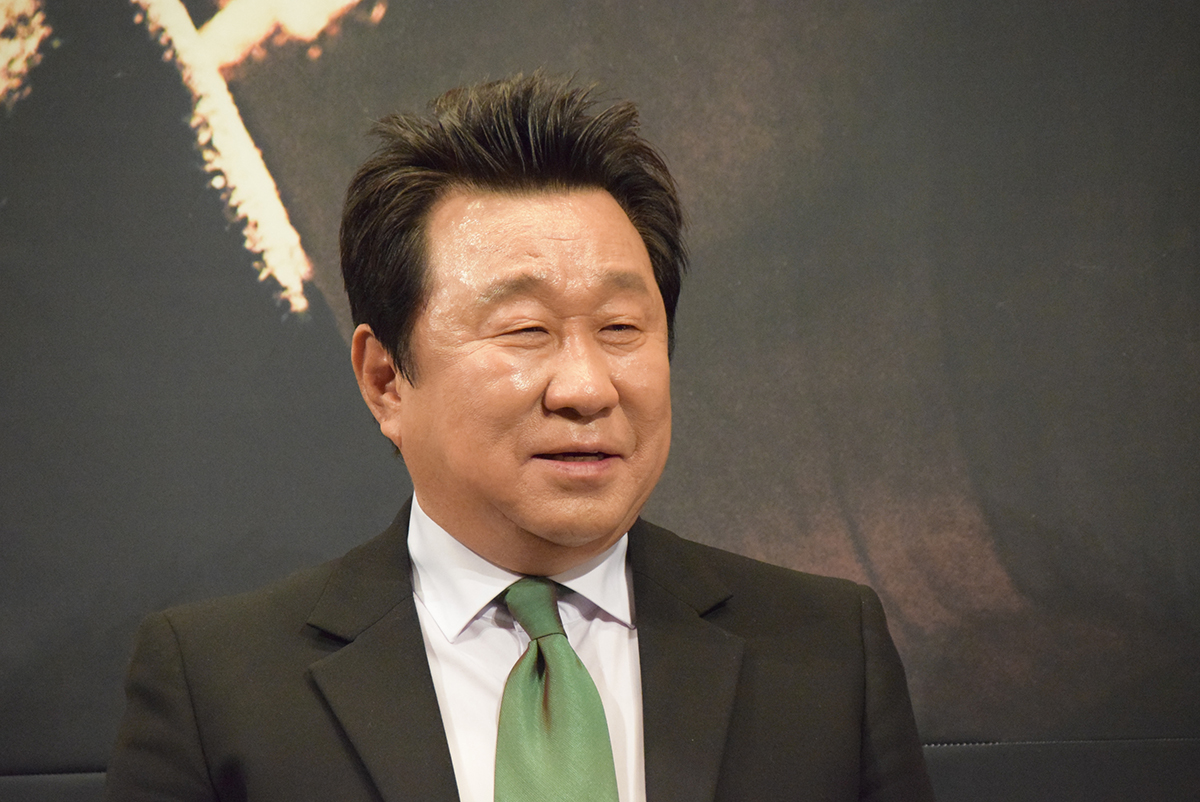
- Im in 2019
- Born: Im Han-yong; October 31, 1952 (age 74); Danyang County, North Chungcheong Province, South Korea
- Education: Hanyang University - Theater and Film
- Occupations: Actor; comedian
- Years active: 1981–present
- Agent: Bel Actors Entertainment
- Spouse: Kim Jeong-gyu
- Family: Im Young-sik

Korean name
- Hangul: 임한용
- Hanja: 林漢龍
- RR: Im Hanyong
- MR: Im Hanyong

Stage name
- Hangul: 임하룡
- Hanja: 林河龍
- RR: Im Haryong
- MR: Im Haryong

Im Ha-ryong (born Im Han-yong on October 31, 1952) is a South Korean actor and comedian. During the 1980s and 1990s, Im was one of Korea's foremost comedians (called "gag men") alongside Shim Hyung-rae and Kim Hyung-gon. As his brand of comedy became less popular among younger viewers, Im started appearing in small supporting roles in films and television series, particularly those directed by Jang Jin. In 2005, he won Best Supporting Actor at the Blue Dragon Film Awards for his first major film role as a veteran soldier in the hit Korean War dramedy Welcome to Dongmakgol. Other notable films include workplace/musical drama Bravo My Life (2007) and political satire Good Morning President (2009).

== Filmography ==
=== Film ===
Year	Title	Role
1985	A Child-like Lady	
1985	The Singing Tramp of Last Year	
1988	High Priest Kong-cho and Super Hong Kil-dong	Guru Kong-cho
1989	Miss Rhino and Mr. Korando	Gambler
1992	Firm Corn Returns	
1992	Hae-ryong and Dal-ja's Bag of Memories	
1998	Extra	(cameo)
1999	Inner Circle	Go Hyung-seok
2002	No Comment	Father (segment: "My Nike")
2004	Too Beautiful to Lie	Husband of Choi Hee-cheol's paternal aunt
2004	The Big Swindle	Company president Seo (cameo)
2004	Arahan	Police substation chief (cameo)
2004	Someone Special	Police captain
2005	Welcome to Dongmakgol	North Korean staff sergeant Jang Young-hee
2006	Hoodwinked!	Det. Nicky Flippers (Korean dubbed)
2006	Barefoot Ki-bong	Mr. Baek
2006	Holy Daddy	Kang Young-kyu
2007	Bravo My Life	Choi Seok-won
2007	Venus and Mars	Divorce lawyer (cameo)
2009	Insadong Scandal	Madam Kwon
2009	Closer to Heaven	Park Geun-sook
2009	Good Morning President	Choi Chang-myeon
2011	I Am a Dad	Detective Kim
2012	The Neighbor	Kim Sang-young
2015	Love Forecast	Principal
2015	Salut d'Amour	(cameo)

=== Television series ===
Year	Title	Role	Notes	Ref.
1998	Angel's Kiss	Angel		
2000	It's Half			
2006	Over the Rainbow	Kwon Sang-bok		
2008	Strongest Chil Woo	Choi Nam-deuk		
2010	More Charming by the Day	Im Ha-ryong		
2011	Me Too, Flower!	Bae Sang-eok		
2012	Welcome to Healing Town	Ban Jung-do		
2012	Lovers of Haeundae	Go Joong-shik		
2012	The Third Hospital	Chae In-gook		
2013	Two Women's Room	Han Byung-gook		
2014	Triangle	Yang Man-choon		
2014	Glorious Day	CEO Lee	Cameo	
2014	Cheongdam-dong Scandal	Nam Jae-bok		
2014	Righteous Love	Jang Min-ho		
2016	My Horrible Boss	Nam Yong-gab		
2016	Another Miss Oh		Cameo	
2018	Tale of Fairy	King Bukdu		
2019	Save Me 2	Park Deok-ho		
2020	365: Repeat the Year	Choi Kyeong-man		
2022	Love Is for Suckers	Goo Yong-sik		
2023–2024	Bumpy Family	Shin Dal-yong		

=== Web series ===
Year	Title	Role	Ref.
2022	Welcome to Wedding Hell	Kim Soo-chan	

=== Variety show ===
Year	Title	Notes/Ref.
1983–1992	Humor No. 1	
1985	9 O'clock Date with Im Ha-ryong and Byun Ah-young	DJ
1986–1987	Cheerful Small Theater	
1987–1991	Show Video Jockey	
1990–1991	Show Saturday Express	
1991–1993	With a Laugh	
1993–1995	Today Is a Good Day	
1995	Our Happy Saturday	
1995–1996	Saturday Express of Luck	
2013	Gag Concert	
2017	King of Mask Singer	Contestant (First-birthday Party) Episode 129
2021	Granpar	Cast Member

=== Music video appearances ===
Year	Song title	Artist
2007	"Because We Are Two"	Eru

== Theater ==
Year	English title	Korean title	Role	Ref.
2022	The Disloyal Cry	불효자는 웁니다	Cholangi	

== Awards and nominations ==
Year	Award	Category	Nominated work	Result
1986	22nd Baeksang Arts Awards	Best Male Variety Performer		Won
1987	Savings' Day	President's Commendation	—N/a	Won
1987	KBS Entertainment Awards	Excellence Award		Won
1989	KBS Entertainment Awards	Grand Prize (Daesang)		Won
1991	KBS Entertainment Awards	Grand Prize (Daesang)		Won
2005	26th Blue Dragon Film Awards	Best Supporting Actor	Welcome to Dongmakgol	Won
2005	4th Korean Film Awards	Best Supporting Actor	Welcome to Dongmakgol	Nominated
2006	43rd Grand Bell Awards	Best Supporting Actor	Welcome to Dongmakgol	Nominated
2006	13th Korean Entertainment Arts Awards	Special Award		Won
2007	14th Korean Entertainment Arts Awards	Achievement Award for the Development of Entertainment and the Arts	—N/a	Won
2010	MBC Entertainment Awards	Special Award in a Comedy or Sitcom	More Charming by the Day	Won
