= Kim Yoo-mi (actress) =

South Korean actress (born 1979)

- 김유미
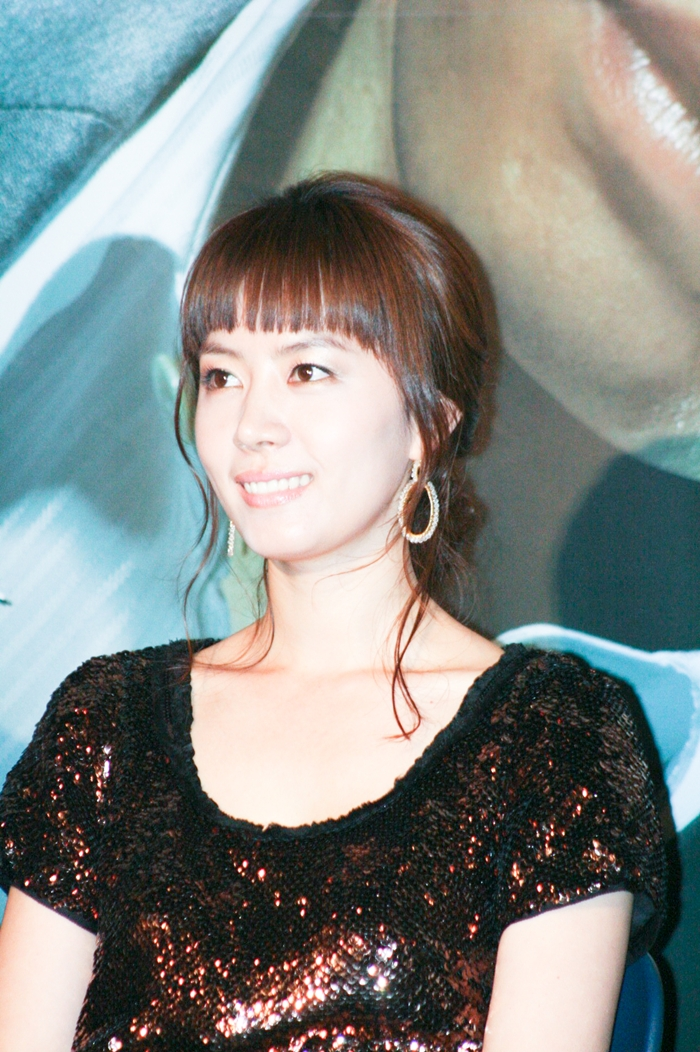
- Kim in 2007
- Born: October 12, 1979 (age 47); Yangyang County, Gangwon Province, South Korea
- Other name: Kim Yu-mi
- Education: Seoul Institute of the Arts - Broadcasting
- Occupation: Actress
- Years active: 1999–present
- Agent: Khan Enterprise
- Spouse: Jung Woo (m. 2016)

Korean name
- Hangul: 김유미
- RR: Gim Yumi
- MR: Kim Yumi

Kim Yoo-mi (Korean: 김유미; born October 12, 1979) is a South Korean actress.

== Early life ==
Kim was born in Yangyang County and moved to Seoul. In 1999, she debuted through a Neutrogena commercial.

== Filmography ==
=== Film ===
Year	Title	Role
2002	Phone	Kang Ho-jeong
2004	Doll Master	Hae-mi
2005	The Windmill Palm Grove	Hwa-yeon/Jung-soon
2006	Detective Odd	Min-joo
2007	Wide Awake	Seo Hee-jin
2013	Black Gospel	herself
2013	Red Family	Baek Seung-hye

=== Television series ===
Year	Title	Role	Notes
2000	SWAT Police	Jung Dan-bi	
2000	Wrath of an Angel	Eun-ha	
2001	The Merchant	Yoon Chae-yeon	
2002	Dayeon	Jung-soo	
2002	Romance	Choi Yoon-hee	
2002	Man of the Sun, Lee Je-ma	Seol-yi	
2003	Country Princess	Lee Geum-hee	
2003	Pearl Necklace	Park Nan-joo	
2006	Common Single	Nam Jung-wan	
2008	Don't Ask Me About Past	Jang Sun-hee	
2008	The Scale of Providence	Shin Young-joo	
2008	Don't Cry My Love	Jae-hee	Cameo appearance
2009	Enjoy Life	Hong Min-soo	
2012	God of War	Choe Woo's second wife	
2013	Heartless City	Lee Jin-sook	
2014	Can We Fall in Love, Again?	Kim Sun-mi	
2019	Romance Is a Bonus Book	Go Yoo-sun	
2021	Hello, Me!	Oh Ji-eun	
2023	See You in My 19th Life	Jo Yoo-seon (young)	Special appearance
2023	The Killing Vote	Min Ji-young	
2023	Doona!	President Ma	
2025	Dear X (TV series)	Hwang Ji-seon	
TBA	80 Billion Boy	Director Yoon	

=== Music video appearances ===
Year	Song title	Artist
2006	"Love Dust"	Bubble Sisters
2008	"Bobbed Hair"	Lee Soo-young
2008	"Show Man"	Peter

== Awards and nominations ==
Year	Award	Category	Nominated work	Result
2000	SBS Drama Awards	New Star Award	SWAT Police, Wrath of an Angel	Won
2002	23rd Blue Dragon Film Awards	Best Supporting Actress	Phone	Nominated
2002	KBS Drama Awards	Best New Actress	Man of the Sun, Lee Je-ma	Won
2006	42nd Baeksang Arts Awards	Best New Actress (Film)	The Windmill Palm Grove	Nominated
2023	2023 SBS Drama Awards	Excellence Award, Actress in a Miniseries Genre/Action Drama	The Killing Vote	Nominated
