= What's Up Fox =

South Korean television series

- Promotional poster
- Also known as: Foxy Lady; Fox, What Are You Doing?
- Hangul: 여우야 뭐하니
- RR: Yeouya mwohani
- MR: Yŏuya mwŏhani
- Genre: Drama; Romantic comedy
- Written by: Kim Do-woo
- Directed by: Kwon Seok-jang
- Starring: Go Hyun-jung; Chun Jung-myung
- Country of origin: South Korea
- Original language: Korean
- No. of episodes: 16

Production
- Producer: Kim Nam-won
- Production location: Korea
- Camera setup: Multi-camera
- Running time: 60 minutes

Original release
- Network: Munhwa Broadcasting Corporation
- Release: September 20 – November 9, 2006

What's Up Fox (Korean: 여우야 뭐하니; RR: Yeouya mwohani, also known as Foxy Lady) is a 2006 South Korean television series, starring Go Hyun-jung and Chun Jung-myung. It aired on MBC from September 20 to November 9, 2006, on Wednesdays and Thursdays at 21:55 for 16 episodes. The romantic comedy explores age differences in relationships, in particular between a 33-year-old woman and her best friend's brother who is nine years younger.

== Plot ==
Go Byung-hee (Go Hyun-jung) is a 33-year-old woman working as a reporter for a third-rate magazine, but with the heart of a 24-year-old virgin girl. She frequently finds it hard to cope with the unexciting aspects of her life. She dreams of someday working for a company that she can be proud of, and of finding the man of her fantasies: someone her age who has a good educational background and is financially stable, who'll provide warm support when she needs it, and who'll go with her on a world tour in a campervan. One day, she gets into an accident with her friend Seung-hye's younger brother, Chul-soo (Chun Jung-myung), and begins to see him in a new light. Park Chul-soo is a 24-year-old high school graduate working as a mechanic at a car repair shop. Although Chul-soo does not seem to have much, he is filled with maturity and enjoys life by doing the things he loves: working as a mechanic and traveling. How many people actually find the love they dream of? Until they realize that true love is just around the corner, this couple continues to pursue this unique romantic relationship of "dating a friend's brother" and "dating my sister's friend."

== Cast ==
=== Main characters ===
- Go Hyun-jung as Go Byung-hee

Reporter working for the magazine C'est Si Bon.

- Chun Jung-myung as Park Chul-soo
  - Yoo Tae-woong as young Chul-soo

Mechanic at Ssing Ssing Auto Repair Shop.

- Cho Yeon-woo as Bae Hee-myung

Urologist who writes an advice column for C'est Si Bon as a medical expert.

- Kim Eun-joo as Go Jun-hee

Byung-hee's younger sister who is a second-rate fashion model.

- Son Hyun-joo as Park Byung-gak

President of a luxury brand.

=== Supporting characters ===
- Youn Yuh-jung as Choi Soon-nam (Byung-hee and Jun-hee's mother)
- Ahn Sun-young as Park Seung-hye (Chul-soo's sister)
- Park Byung-sun as Oh Pil-kyo (Soon-nam's real estate employee)
- Kwon Hae-hyo as Hwang Yong-kil (magazine publisher)
- Choi Yoon-jung as Jo Sung-ran
- Seo Young as Joo-hee
- Choi Woo-je as Sun-woo (Byung-hee's college friend)
- Seo Hye-jin as Jo Hyun-jung (Byung-hee's co-worker)
- Jung Ki-sung as Director Kim
- Kim Hak-chul as an auto repair shop owner

== Ratings ==
- In the table below, the blue numbers represent the lowest ratings and the red numbers represent the highest ratings.

Date	Episode	Nationwide
2006-09-20	1	17.8%
2006-09-21	2	18.5%
2006-09-27	3	18.5%
2006-09-28	4	20.3%
2006-10-04	5	18.0%
2006-10-05	6	17.6%
2006-10-11	7	16.4%
2006-10-12	8	17.6%
2006-10-18	9	16.6%
2006-10-19	10	17.0%
2006-10-25	11	17.5%
2006-10-26	12	21.1%
2006-11-01	13	18.2%
2006-11-02	14	15.4%
2006-11-08	15	14.1%
2006-11-09	16	16.3%
Average		17.5%

Source: TNS Media Korea

== International broadcast ==
It aired in Japan on cable channel KNTV from September 20 to November 9, 2006, and cable channel Wowow beginning April 19, 2007. In Philippines year 2007 to aired on GMA 7 with Filipino dubbed version under the title of Foxy Lady premiere July 9, 2007 – September 21, 2007 with the OST local title With a Smile song by Eraserheads.
