= All for Love (2005 film) =

2005 South Korean romantic comedy film

- Theatrical release poster
- Hangul: 내 생애 가장 아름다운 일주일
- Hanja: 내 生涯 가장 아름다운 一週日
- Lit.: The Most Beautiful Week of My Life
- RR: Nae saengae gajang areumdaun iljuil
- MR: Nae saengae kajang arŭmdaun ilchuil
- Directed by: Min Kyu-dong
- Written by: Yu Seong-hyeop; Min Kyu-dong
- Produced by: Yoon Je-kyoon; Heo Tae-gu; Min Jin-su
- Starring: Uhm Jung-hwa; Im Chang-jung; Kim Soo-ro; Hwang Jung-min
- Cinematography: Oh Seung-hwan
- Edited by: Moon In-dae
- Music by: Lee Byung-woo
- Distributed by: CJ Entertainment
- Release date: October 7, 2005
- Running time: 129 minutes
- Country: South Korea
- Language: Korean
- Box office: US$14.8 million

All for Love (Korean: 내 생애 가장 아름다운 일주일; lit. 'The Most Beautiful Week of My Life'; also known as My Lovely Week) is a 2005 South Korean romantic comedy film. It was Min Kyu-dong's solo directorial debut. The film was the 10th highest grossing Korean production of 2005 with 2,533,103 sold nationwide.

== Synopsis ==
A week passes in Seoul, with a diverse group of couples and singles experiencing love or tragedy in strong doses. Broken families and newly formed marriages, struggles with debt or with an uneasy conscience, conflict and resolution, sickness and health, newly discovered love, the resurfacing of old relationships...

== Plot ==
A lovely week in the lives of these people.

An elderly woman (Oh Mi-hee) rents a coffee shop from a gruff theater owner (Joo Hyun).

A newlywed couple crushed by debt and desperate for work, the down-on-his-luck salesman (Im Chang-jung) hides the fact that he sells trinkets on the subway from his wife (Seo Young-hee).

A bill collector (Kim Soo-ro) who is fed up with his job is then offered a spot on a local reality television show to relive his college basketball days and also fulfill the wish of a terminally ill girl (Kim You-jung).

A tightly wound, divorced father (Chun Ho-jin) works in the music industry. He is struggling to raise his son, and needs to find a maid.

His ex-wife (Uhm Jung-hwa) is a fiery spirited psychiatrist, who has perhaps met her match with a rough-and-tumble cop (Hwang Jung-min).

A famous male pop singer (Jung Kyung-ho) becomes stricken with a mysterious illness after his contract is cancelled by the music executive. He meets a young nun (Yoon Jin-seo) who tried to kill herself due to her strong feelings for him.

== Cast ==
- Uhm Jung-hwa as Hur Yu-jung
- Im Chang-jung as Kim Chang-hoo
- Kim Soo-ro as Park Sung-won
- Hwang Jung-min as Na Do-chul
- Joo Hyun as Mr. Kwak
- Chun Ho-jin as Jo Jae-kyung
- Yoon Jin-seo as Im Soo-kyung
- Jung Kyung-ho as Yu Jung-hun
- Seo Young-hee as Ha Seon-ae
- Oh Mi-hee as Oh Yeo-in
- Jeon Hye-jin as Writer Lee
- Kim Tae-hyun as Min Tae-hyun
- Lee Byeong-jun as Jo Ji-seok
- Kim You-jung as Kim Jin-a
- Kim Yoon-seok as Dong-man
- Jung Yoon-min as Det. Lee
- Hwang Hyo-eun as Nurse Kim
- Ha Ji-won as Yun-joo (cameo)
- Ryu Seung-soo as assistant director (cameo)
- Jo Hee-bong as cameo
- Lee Se-young as actress Jasmine (cameo)
- Woo Hyun as cameo
- Lee Hwan as pickpocket (cameo)
- Park Jin-woo
- Shin Sung-rok
- Han Sang-jin as youngest detective
- Kim Dong-wook
- Park Jeong-sun

== Awards and nominations ==
2005 Chunsa Film Art Awards

- Best Supporting Actress - Oh Mi-hee
- Best New Actor - Kim Tae-hyun
- Best New Actress - Seo Young-hee
- Best Screenplay - Yu Seong-hyeop and Min Kyu-dong
- Best Planning/Producer - Oh Jeong-wan, Lee Yoo-jin
- Special Jury Prize - Min Kyu-dong

2005 Blue Dragon Film Awards

- Nomination - Best Supporting Actress - Seo Young-hee
- Nomination - Best Screenplay - Yu Seong-hyeop and Min Kyu-dong
- Nomination - Best Visual Effects

2005 Korean Film Awards

- Best Editing - Moon In-dae

2006 Grand Bell Awards

- Nomination - Best Director - Min Kyu-dong
- Nomination - Best Screenplay - Yu Seong-hyeop and Min Kyu-dong
- Nomination - Best New Actor - Jung Kyung-ho
- Nomination - Best New Actress - Kim You-jung
