= Cho Geun-hyun =

South Korean filmmaker

- Born: South Korea
- Occupations: Art director film director

Korean name
- Hangul: 조근현
- RR: Jo Geunhyeon
- MR: Cho Kŭnhyŏn

Cho Geun-hyun (Korean: 조근현) is a South Korean art director and film director.

== Career ==
He made his directorial debut, with the drama thriller 26 Years (2012). It was voted Best Korean Film by Twitter users in a poll held by the Korean Film Council in December 2012.

His second feature Late Spring (2014) premiered at the Santa Barbara International Film Festival. It won a total of six awards, including Best Foreign Feature at the 23rd Arizona International Film Festival, Best Film at the 14th Milan International Film Festival Awards and Best Asian Narrative Film at the 13th Asian Film Festival of Dallas in 2014.

== Controversy ==
On February 8, a rookie actress filed a claim on SNS that she had been sexually harassed by Cho during a casting interview for a music video actor on 18 December 2017.

== Filmography ==
=== As art director ===
- L'Abri (2002)
- A Tale of Two Sisters (2003)
- My Mother, the Mermaid (2004)
- Heaven's Soldiers (2005)
- Duelist (2005)
- From Here to Seoul (short film, 2006)
- Forbidden Quest (2006)
- Evil Twin (2007)
- My Father (2007)
- Radio Dayz (2008)
- Go Go 70s (2008)
- The Accidental Gangster and the Mistaken Courtesan (2008)
- Love, In Between (2010)
- My Way (2011)
- The Concubine (2012)

=== As film director ===
- 26 Years (2012) (also credited as script editor)
- Late Spring (2014) (also credited as script editor)
- The Lightning Man's Secret (2015)
- Heung-boo: The Revolutionist (2018)

=== Art department ===
- Herb (2007)
- Love Now (2007)
- A Tale of Legendary Libido (2008)
- More than Blue (2009)

== Awards ==
- 2003 2nd Korean Film Awards: Best Art Direction (A Tale of Two Sisters)
- 2005 26th Blue Dragon Film Awards: Best Art Direction (award shared with Lee Hyeong-ju) (Duelist)
- 2006 43rd Grand Bell Awards: Best Art Direction (award shared with Lee Hyeong-ju) (Duelist)
- 2006 5th Korean Film Awards: Best Art Direction (Forbidden Quest)
- 2006 27th Blue Dragon Film Awards: Best Art Direction (award shared with Hong Joo-hee) (Forbidden Quest)
- 2006 26th Korean Association of Film Critics Awards: Best Art Direction (Forbidden Quest)
