= Kim Si-hoo =

South Korean actor

Kim Si-Hoo
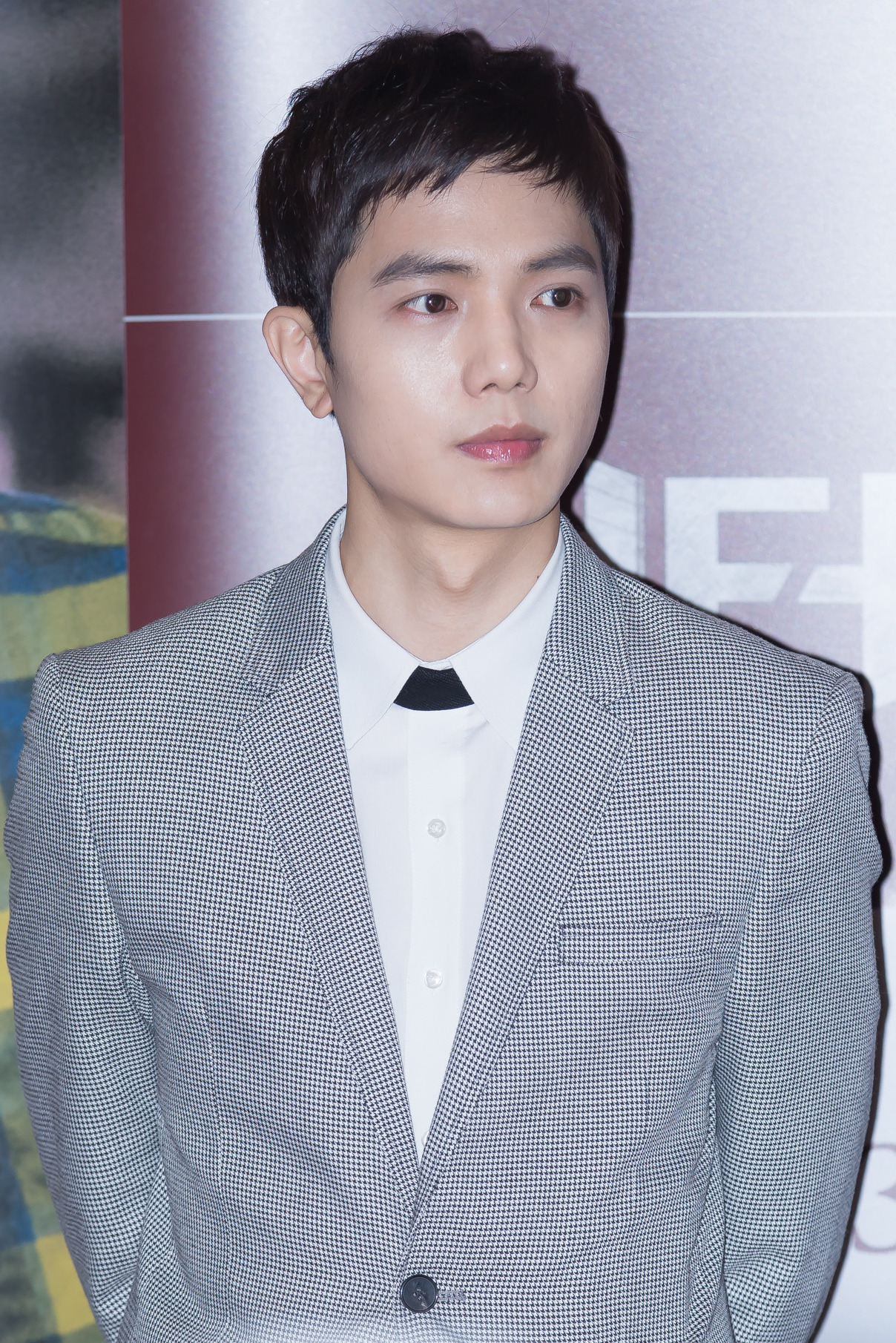
- Kim in 2016
- Born: Kim Young-Joon; 2 January 1988 (age 38); Cheongju, South Korea
- Education: Daejin University – Theater and Visual Arts; Korea National Open University – Visual Media
- Occupation: Actor
- Years active: 2003–present
- Agent: Hycon Entertainment

Korean name
- Hangul: 김영준
- Hanja: 金榮俊
- RR: Gim Yeongjun
- MR: Kim Yŏngjun

Stage name
- Hangul: 김시후
- RR: Gim Sihu
- MR: Kim Sihu

Kim Si-Hoo (born Kim Young-Joon on 2 January 1988) is a South Korean actor.

== Filmography ==
=== Film ===
Year	Title	Role
2005	Sympathy for Lady Vengeance	Geun-shik
2006	The City of Violence	Yoo Suk-hwan (young)
2006	A Bloody Aria	Hyun-jae
2008	A Ghosts Story	Soo-woong
2011	Sunny	Han Joon-ho (1980s) / Han Joon-ho's son (2011)
2011	My Way	Tsukamoto
2013	Steel Cold Winter	Seo Yoon-soo
2015	Veteran	Detective Yoon
2016	Eclipse	Yoon-jae
2024	I, the Executioner	Detective Yoon

=== Television series ===
Year	Title	Role	Network
2003	Sharp 1	Lee Soon-shin	
2008	Formidable Rivals	Cha Young-goo	
2008	The Secret of Coocoo Island	Kim Shi-hoo	
2012	Love Rain	Lee Dong-wook (1970s) / Lee Sun-ho (2012)	
2014	12 Years Promise	Yoo Joon-sung	
2019	I Wanna Hear Your Song	Kim Ian	special appearance
2023	Apple of My Eye	Dong Joo-hyuk	

=== Web series ===
Year	Title	Role	Notes	Ref.
2015	Sweet Temptation	Chae-soo	Cameo (episode 7–8)	

== Awards and nominations ==
Year	Award	Category	Nominated work	Result
2006	43rd Grand Bell Awards	Best New Actor	Sympathy for Lady Vengeance	Nominated
