= Kim Yoon-hye =

South Korean actress (born 1991)

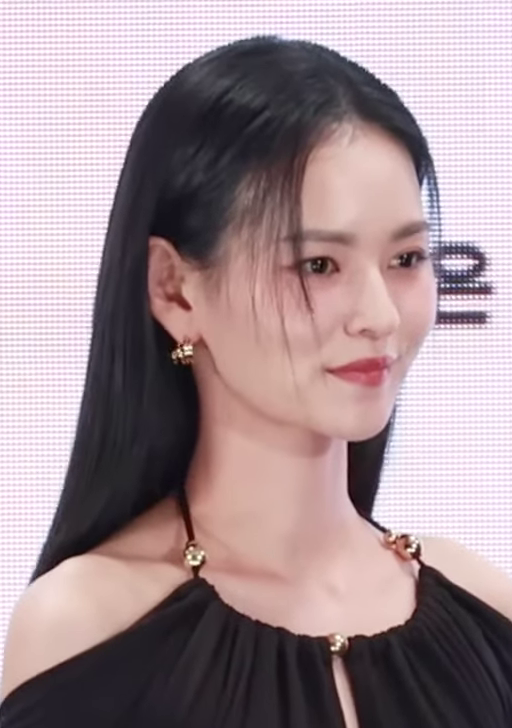
- Kim in October 2024
- Born: May 24, 1991 (age 35); Seocho-dong, Seocho District, Seoul, South Korea
- Other name: Woori (우리)
- Occupation: Actress
- Years active: 2002–present
- Agent: J-Wide Company
- Spouse: Unknown (m. 2025)

Korean name
- Hangul: 김윤혜
- Hanja: 金允慧
- RR: Gim Yunhye
- MR: Kim Yunhye

Kim Yoon-hye (Korean: 김윤혜; born May 24, 1991) is a South Korean actress.

== Career ==
Kim first appeared on a 2002 magazine cover of Vogue Girl Korea, and also modeled for MTV Asia in 2005 before starring in several music videos. She made her acting debut under the stage name Woori, which means "us" in Korean, making it difficult for her name to be searched on internet portals. She reverted to using her real name Kim Yoon-hye during the promotions for horror-comedy film Ghost Sweepers in 2012. Kim next appeared in the TV dramas Heartstrings, I Need a Fairy (also known as Sent from Heaven), and My Cute Guys. In 2013, she garnered positive reviews for her portrayal of a cold and aloof high school girl in romantic thriller Steel Cold Winter.

In September 2022, Kim signed with new agency J-Wide Company.

== Personal life ==
On October 13, 2025, it was reported that Kim would marry a non-celebrity later that month. The couple got married on October 25 at a hotel in Jung District.

== Filmography ==
=== Film ===
Year	Title	Role	Notes	Ref.
2007	My Son	Mimi		
2012	Ghost Sweepers	Seung-hee		
2013	Steel Cold Winter	Eun Hae-won		
2015	The Advocate: A Missing Body	Han Min-jeong		
2017	Because I Love You	Kim Mal-hee		
2019	Private Woman	TBA		
2024	The Sin	Si-young		

=== Television series ===
Year	Title	Role	Notes	Ref.
2010	My Mom! Super Mom!	Kang Eun-ki		
2011	Detectives in Trouble	Lee So-min	(Guest, episodes 7–8)	
2011	Heartstrings	Han Hee-joo		
2012	I Need a Fairy	Cha Na-ra		
2013	Flower Boys Next Door	Yoon Seo-young		
2013	Who Are You?	Im Jung-eun	(Guest, episode 16)	
2016	The Vampire Detective	Jung Yoo-Jin		
2017	My Sassy Girl	Jung Da-yeon		
2018	The Third Charm	Min Se-eun		
2020	18 Again	Kwon Yu-mi		
2021	Vincenzo	Seo Mi-ri		
2021	Friendly Police	Arin	Midnight Thriller	
2022	Shooting Stars	Park Ho-young		
2024	Jeongnyeon: The Star Is Born	Seo Hye-rang		
2025	Love Scout	Jung Soo-hyun		

=== Web series ===
Year	Title	Role	Ref.
2021	Mojito:The Magic	Seo Ye-ji	
2024	Goodbye Earth	Kang In-ah	

=== Variety show ===
Year	Title	Notes
2010	Hit the Ball! Home Run King	Cast

=== Music video appearances ===
Year	Song title	Artist
2006	"Don't Go, My Love"	Lim Jeong-hee
2006	"Sayonara"	Lee Seung-chul
2007	"This Is Me"	SAT
2009	"In a Pallid State"	Gavy NJ
2010	"Bad Guy Good Girl"	Sunny Side
2010	"Women...Know"	Ab Avenue
2011	"Echo"	Kim Tae-woo
2015	"Let's Not Fall in Love"	Big Bang

== Awards and nominations ==
Year	Award	Category	Nominated work	Result
2014	34th Golden Cinema Festival	Best New Actress	Steel Cold Winter	Won
