= Duelist (2005 film) =

2005 South Korean martial arts film directed by Lee Myeong-se

- Theatrical release poster
- Hangul: 형사
- Hanja: 刑事
- Lit.: Detective
- RR: Hyeongsa
- MR: Hyŏngsa
- Directed by: Lee Myung-se
- Written by: Lee Myung-se; Lee Hae-kyeong
- Based on: Damo Namsoon by Bang Hak-gi
- Produced by: Lee Myung-se; Yoo Jeong-hee
- Starring: Ha Ji-won; Gang Dong-won; Ahn Sung-ki
- Cinematography: Hwang Ki-seok
- Edited by: Ko Im-pyo
- Music by: Jo Seong-woo
- Production company: Production M
- Distributed by: Korea Pictures
- Release date: September 8, 2005 (South Korea)
- Running time: 111 minutes
- Country: South Korea
- Language: Korean
- Box office: US$6.3 million

Duelist (Korean: 형사; RR: Hyeongsa; lit. 'Detective') is a 2005 South Korean period martial arts film directed by Lee Myung-se. It stars Ha Ji-won, Gang Dong-won, and Ahn Sung-ki. The film was released in South Korea on September 8, 2005.

== Plot ==
The film opens with a fish tale narrated by a low-class metalsmith in a tavern in Joseon-era south-western Korea. The scene then cuts to a street circus, in which an elegant masked swordmaster (Gang Dong-won) fascinates his market-place audience. Undercover detective Ahn (Ahn Sung-ki), and his protégé Namsoon (Ha Ji-won) are tracking down suspected money-counterfeiter gang, when the masked swordmaster ends his show by killing a government official who carries the kingdom's currency metal cast.

The swordmaster escapes when a cart crashes and disgorges a mountain of counterfeit coins, causing public commotion. The distraction is a success, but Namsoon chased and dueled with the escaping swordmaster/duelist, proving herself a master of martial arts specializing in a pair of long knives. She succeeded in cutting a quarter of his mask and glanced at his revealed eye before he escaped. She and her team are left with bodies of the counterfeiting gang, seemingly massacred in an instant by an unknown duelist.

It is then revealed that counterfeit coins are spreading wildly among the populace, causing hyperinflation that threatens the monarchy. The police forces are determined to find and arrest the counterfeiters, believed to include an insider in the government. From a secret connection, the detectives obtain a picture of the duelist, noted for his "Sad Eyes", which Namsoon recognizes from her previous encounter. Their suspicion points to Song, the powerful defense minister. This suspicion is confirmed when Namsoon spots the duelist entering Song's manor.

Namsoon and Ahn failed to chase the duelist. However, as Namsoon is walking alone in the night, Sad Eyes appeared from the shadows, asking if she is following him "because you like me?" Namsoon attacks, entering a duel that starts to become affectionate. Eventually, he vanishes after making a small cut on her clothing, revealing her cleavage. The resolute Namsoon persuaded her team to infiltrate minister Song's palace. This plan is implemented, resulting in only Namsoon succeeding in her thinly-disguised appearance as a lady of pleasure. Coincidentally, she ends up having to serve the duelist in private, which she handles very tactlessly.

Song called the duelist, interrupting Namsoon's session with her. Song turns out to be a superb swordsman, the only person who can outperform the duelist. Their conversation reveals that Song plans to overthrow the reigning young king and replace him with his future son-in-law and that the duelist has been involved in this plan since childhood. Song reminds Sad Eyes that the duelist can kill him anytime he distrusts him, hinting that the duelist might be the planned royal successor. Song says that he always loved the duelist like a son.

After assaulting Sad Eyes in public, Namsoon is dismissed from the case by her director, only to be secretly assigned to find the final evidence to prove Song's involvement. Overhearing Namsoon's objectives, the duelist gave the needed evidence in a secret meeting with her, thereby sacrificing his destiny. Namsoon realizes her feelings for Sad Eyes. The father-figure Ahn recognizes this, advising her to forgo her feelings since he is a criminal while she is with the police. The movie draws towards a climax as scores of armed police surround Song's manor and attack the duelist and Song, as well as the other corrupt officials. In their last conversation, the minister tried to speak the nameless duelist's true name, but the police separate them and detective Ahn kills the minister.

After the battle, Namsoon anxiously searches for the duelist's fate, only to be told by Ahn that "he is dead". Devastated, she returns to the lanes where she had encountered the duelist, haunted by his images. While she is walking back, the duelist appears once more in front of her. Namsoon feels that finally she can express her feelings, and in a denouement, the couple dances in a picturesque combat under the moonlight. They were fighting "like they were making love", but then "disappeared suddenly", as narrated by the metalsmith in the tavern from the first scene.

The final scene shows Namsoon and Sad Eyes spotting each other from a distance in the marketplace.

== Cast ==
- Ha Ji-won as Detective Namsoon
- Gang Dong-won as Sad Eyes
- Ahn Sung-ki as Detective Ahn
- Song Young-chang as Minister Song Pil-joon
- Yoon Joo-sang as Bong-chool
- Do Yong-goo
- Shim Cheol-jong
- Bae Joong-sik as Detective Bae
- Hwang Eui-doo as Detective Hwang
- Jang In-bo as Detective Jang
- Kim Jung-tae as Ga Do-chi

== Awards and nominations ==
2005 Blue Dragon Film Awards

- Best Art Direction: Cho Geun-hyun, Lee Hyeong-ju
- Best Lighting: Shin Kyung-man
- Popular Star Award: Ha Ji-won, Gang Dong-won
- Nomination - Best Supporting Actor: Ahn Sung-ki
- Nomination - Best Cinematography: Hwang Ki-seok
- Nomination - Technical Award: Jang Seong-ho (CG)

2005 Korean Film Awards

- Nomination - Best Cinematography: Hwang Ki-seok
- Nomination - Best Art Direction: Cho Geun-hyun, Lee Hyeong-ju
- Nomination - Best Visual Effects: Jang Seong-ho
- Nomination - Best Sound: Park Jun-oh

2006 Baeksang Arts Awards

- Best Director: Lee Myung-se
- Nomination - Best Film

2006 Grand Bell Awards

- Best Art Direction: Cho Geun-hyun, Lee Hyeong-ju
- Nomination - Best Supporting Actor: Ahn Sung-ki
- Nomination - Best Cinematography: Hwang Ki-seok
- Nomination - Best Editing: Ko Im-pyo
- Nomination - Best Lighting: Shin Kyung-man
- Nomination - Best Costume Design: Jung Kyung-hee
- Nomination - Best Visual Effects: MoFac Studio
