= List of South Korean films of 2008 =

This is a complete list of South Korean films that received a domestic theatrical release in 2008.

Source for release dates and box-office admission results (except where cited otherwise): Koreanfilm.org.

== Box office ==
The highest-grossing South Korean films released in 2008, by domestic box office gross revenue, are as follows:

Highest-grossing films released in 2008
Rank	Title	Distributor	Domestic gross
1	Scandal Makers	Lotte Cultureworks	$43,723,154
2	The Good, the Bad, the Weird	CJ Entertainment	$35,559,513
3	The Chaser	Showbox	$27,620,446
4	Public Enemy Returns	CJ Entertainment	$23,273,844
5	Forever the Moment	Sidus Pictures	$21,227,061
6	A Frozen Flower	Showbox	$20,651,624
7	The Divine Weapon	CJ Entertainment	$19,769,529
8	Portrait of a Beauty	CJ Entertainment	$12,722,738
9	Eye for an Eye	Lotte Cultureworks	$10,898,668
10	My Wife Got Married	CJ Entertainment	$9,802,973

== Released ==
English/Korean Title	Director	Cast	Released	Admissions	Notes
26 Years Diary 너를 잊지 않을거야	Junji Hanado	Lee Tae-sung; Mākii	30 October	31,614	A joint production between Japan and South Korea.
4 Days; 4요일: 죽음을 부르는 요일	Seo Min-yeong	Jeong Woon-taek; Lim Ye-won	10 December	27,368	
63 Years On	Kim Dong-won	Jan Ruff-O'Herne; Felicidad de los Reyes; Pilar Frias; Wei Shao Lan; Lee Soo-san			Documentary. Won Best Documentary Feature Film at the 2nd Asia Pacific Screen Awards.
The Accidental Gangster and the Mistaken Courtesan; 1724 기방난동사건	Yeo Kyun-dong	Lee Jung-jae; Kim Ok-vin	3 December	290,015	
Action Boys 우린 액션 배우다	Jeong Byeong-gil	Kwon Ki-deok; Kwak Jin-seok	28 August	8,574	Documentary.
Antique 서양골동양과자점 앤티크	Min Kyu-dong	Ju Ji-hoon; Kim Jae-wook	13 November	1,192,456	
BA:BO 바보	Kim Jung-kwon	Cha Tae-hyun; Ha Ji-won	28 February	974,353	
Baby and I 아기와 나	Kim Jin-yeong	Jang Keun-suk; Moon Mason	13 August	437,027	
Beautiful 아름답다	Juhn Jai-hong	Cha Soo-yeon; Lee Chun-hee	14 February	1,478	
Beyond All Magic 흑심모녀	Jo Nam-ho	Kim Soo-mi; Shim Hye-jin	12 June	58,309	Also known as Delivering Love.
Boy Director 소년 감독	Lee Woo-yeol	Kim Young-chan; Rhonda Lee Zakutney	30 October	821	
Boy Meets Boy 소년, 소년을 만나다	Kim-Jho Gwangsoo	Kim Hye-seong; Lee Hyun-jin	20 November	3,124	Short film.
Butterflymole 나비두더지	Seo Myeong-soo	Park Jin-gook; Pan Yeong-jin	22 February	112	
The Chaser 추격자	Na Hong-jin	Kim Yoon-seok; Ha Jung-woo	14 February	5,071,454	
Cherry Tomato 방울 토마토	Jung Young-bae	Shin Goo; Kim Hyang-gi	29 May	18,134	
Chongqing 중경	Zhang Lü		6 November		A joint production between China and South Korea.
Crazy Waiting 기다리다 미쳐	Ryu Seung-jin	Son Tae-young; Jang Keun-suk	1 January	448,189	Also known as The Longest 24 Months.
Crossing 크로싱	Kim Tae-kyun	Cha In-pyo; Shin Myeong-cheol	26 June	891,792	
Crush and Blush 미쓰 홍당무	Lee Kyoung-mi	Gong Hyo-jin; Lee Jong-hyuk	16 October	536,980	
Da Capo 하늘을 걷는 소년	No Zin-soo	Heo Yi-jae; Kang San	23 October		
Dachimawa Lee 다찌마와 리 - 악인이여 지옥행 급행열차를 타라!	Ryoo Seung-wan	Im Won-hee; Park Si-yeon	13 August	629,591	
Death Bell 고死: 피의 중간고사	Chang	Lee Beom-soo; Yoon Jung-hee	6 August	1,636,149	
The Devil's Game 더 게임	Yoon In-ho	Shin Ha-kyun; Byun Hee-bong	31 January	1,496,215	
A Different Kind of Life 색다른 동거	Kim Jeong-woo	Kim Hyeok; Jeong Si-ah	17 April	1,891	Released in competition with Manner of Battle as part of the "Director Jang vs Director Kim" contest.
Dimmer	Kim Sam-ryeok		11 January	313	
The Divine Weapon 신기전	Kim Yoo-jin	Jung Jae-young; Han Eun-jung	4 September	3,749,611	
Do Re Mi Fa So La Ti Do 도레미파솔라시도	Kang Geon-hyang	Jang Keun-suk; Cha Ye-ryun	3 April	182,940	
Dream 비몽	Kim Ki-duk	Joe Odagiri; Lee Na-young	9 October	88,482	
The ESP Couple 초감각 커플	Kim Hyeong-joo	Jin Goo; Park Bo-young	27 November	3,648	
Eye for an Eye 눈에는 눈, 이에는 이	Ahn Gwon-tae; Kwak Kyung-taek	Han Suk-kyu; Cha Seung-won	30 July	2,073,158	
Farewell 작별	Hwang Yoon		27 March	1,302	Documentary. Produced in 2001.
Fate 숙명	Kim Hae-gon	Song Seung-heon; Kwon Sang-woo	20 March	857,648	
Forever the Moment 우리 생애 최고의 순간	Yim Soon-rye	Moon So-ri; Kim Jung-eun; Uhm Tae-woong	10 January	4,043,293	Won "Best Film" at the 44th Baeksang Arts Awards.
Forgiveness, Are You at the End of That Path? 용서, 그 먼 길 끝에 당신이 있습니까	Jo Wook-hee	Kim Hye-soo	6 November		Documentary.
Frivolous Wife 날나리 종부전	Lim Won-gook	Park Jung-ah; Park Jin-woo	22 May	25,739	
A Frozen Flower 쌍화점	Yoo Ha	Zo In-sung; Joo Jin-mo	30 December	3,739,041	
Girl Scout 걸 스카우트	Kim Sang-man	Kim Sun-a; Na Moon-hee	5 June	249,063	
Go Go 70s 고고70	Choi Ho	Cho Seung-woo; Shin Min-a	2 October	590,295	
The Good, the Bad, the Weird 좋은 놈, 나쁜 놈, 이상한 놈	Kim Jee-woon	Song Kang-ho; Lee Byung-hun; Jung Woo-sung	17 July	6,605,187	
The Guard Post; GP506	Kong Su-chang	Chun Ho-jin; Jo Hyun-jae	3 April	944,943	
Happy Together 동거, 동락	Kim Tae-hee	Kim Cheong; Jeong Seung-ho; Jo Yoon-hee	27 March	3,838	
Heartbreak Library 그 남자의 책 198쪽	Kim Jung-kwon	Lee Dong-wook; Eugene	23 October	93,126	
Hellcats 뜨거운 것이 좋아	Kwon Chil-in	Lee Mi-sook; Kim Min-hee; Ahn So-hee	17 January	590,039	
Hello, Schoolgirl 순정만화	Ryu Jang-ha	Yoo Ji-tae; Lee Yeon-hee	27 November	740,379	
His Last Gift 마지막 선물	Kim Young-jun	Shin Hyun-joon; Huh Joon-ho	5 February	272,890	
Humming 허밍	Park Dae-yeong	Lee Chun-hee; Han Ji-hye	13 March	103,775	
If You Were Me: Anima Vision 2 별별 이야기 2 - 여섯 빛깔 무지개	Ahn Dong-hee; Hong Deok-pyo; Jeong Min-yeong; Kwon Mi-jeong; Lee Hong-min; Lee Hong-soo; Park Yong-je; Ryoo Jeong-woo		17 April	4,097	Animation. Part of the If You Were Me series of films.
Indie Anibox: Selma's Protein Coffee 인디애니박스: 셀마의 단백질 커피	Jang Hyeong-yoon; Kim Woon-ki; Yeon Sang-ho	Oh Jung-se	20 June	1,843	Animation omnibus.
Inner Circle Line 내부순환선	Jo Eun-hee	Yang Eun-yong; Bae Yong-geun	22 February	312	
Iri 이리	Zhang Lü	Yoon Jin-seo; Uhm Tae-woong	13 November	923	
Lady Camellia 동백 아가씨	Park Jeongsuk		20 November	915	Documentary.
The Last Dining Table 마지막 밥상	Roh Gyeong-tae	KIm Do-yeon; Baek Hyun-joo	11 April		
Life is Beautiful 대한이, 민국씨	Choi Jin-won	Choi Sung-kook; Gong Hyung-jin	14 February	212,854	Also known as Smile Babo.
Life Is Cool 그녀는 예뻤다	Choi Ik-hwan	Kim Soo-ro; Kang Sung-jin	12 June	3,951	Animation.
Life Track 궤도	Jin Guang-hao	Chui Jing-hu; Jang So-yeon	11 July		A joint production between South Korea and China.
A Light Sleep 가벼운 잠	Lim Seong-chan	Choi Ah-jin; Yoon Chan	23 October		
Like Father, Like Son 아버지와 마리와 나	Lee Moo-yeong	Kim Sang-joong; Kim Heung-soo	12 June	4,001	
Lineage of the Voice 소리 아이	Yeon-ah Paik		18 September	2,157	Documentary.
Little Prince 어린 왕자	Choi Jong-hyeon	Tak Jae-hoon; Kang Su-han	17 January	83,977	
Loner 외톨이	Park Jae-sik	Go Eun-ah; Chae Min-seo	18 September	74,753	
Lost and Found 달콤한 거짓말	Jeong Jeong-hwa	Park Jin-hee; Jo Han-sun	17 December	485,212	Also known as Sweet Lie.
Lovers 연인들	Kim Jong-kwan	Jung Yu-mi; Yang Ik-june	4 December	1,433	Omnibus.
Lovers of Six Years; 6년째 연애중	Park Hyun-jin	Kim Ha-neul; Yoon Kye-sang	5 February	1,123,294	
A Man Who Was Superman 슈퍼맨이었던 사나이	Jeong Yoon-cheol	Jun Ji-hyun; Hwang Jung-min	30 January	559,867	
Mandate 맨데이트: 신이 주신 임무	Park Hee-jun	Jae Hee; Yoo Da-in	30 October	12,495	
Manner of Battle 전투의 매너	Jang Hang-jun	Kang Kyung-joon; Seo Yoo-jung	17 April	1,087	Released in competition with A Different Kind of Life as part of the "Director Jang vs Director Kim" contest.
Marriage Clinic: Love and War 사랑과 전쟁: 열두 번째 남자	Kwak Gi-won	Lee Joo-na; Lee Jeong-hoon	25 September	7,213	Based on the KBS weekly drama series Couple Clinic: Love and War.
Modern Boy 모던 보이	Jung Ji-woo	Park Hae-il; Kim Hye-soo	2 October	761,090	
The Moonlight of Seoul 비스티 보이즈	Yoon Jong-bin	Yoon Kye-sang; Ha Jung-woo	30 April	727,348	
My Darling FBI 쉿! 그녀에겐 비밀이에요	Lee In-so	Kim Gyu-ri; Ricky Kim	4 September	1,794	
My Dear Enemy 멋진 하루	Lee Yoon-ki	Jeon Do-yeon; Ha Jung-woo	25 September	386,761	
My Friend and His Wife 나의 친구, 그의 아내	Shin Dong-il	Jang Hyun-sung; Park Hee-soon	27 November	3,439	Premiered at the 2006 Pusan International Film Festival.
My Love Yurie 내 사랑 유리에	Ko Eun-ki	Ko Da-mi; Kang Hui	31 January	209	
My Mighty Princess 무림 여대생	Kwak Jae-yong	Shin Min-a; On Joo-wan	26 June	27,309	
My New Partner 마이 뉴 파트너	Kim Jong-hyeon	Ahn Sung-ki; Jo Han-sun	6 March	265,358	
My Song Is... 나의 노래는	Ahn Seul-gi	Sin Hyeon-ho; Min Se-yeon	25 April	380	
My Wife Got Married 아내가 결혼했다	Jeong Yoon-soo	Kim Joo-hyuk; Son Ye-jin	23 October	1,830,328	
Night and Day 밤과 낮	Hong Sang-soo	Kim Yeong-ho; Hwang Soo-jung	28 February	10,620	Won Best Film at the 17th Buil Film Awards.
Nowhere to Turn 여기보다 어딘가에	Lee Seung-yeong	Cha Soo-yeon; Yoo Ha-joon	21 August	772	
Once Upon a Time 원스 어폰 어 타임	Jeong Yong-ki	Park Yong-woo; Lee Bo-young	30 January	1,562,752	
Once Upon a Time in Seoul 소년은 울지 않는다	Bae Hyeong-joon	Lee Wan; Song Chang-eui	6 November	99,043	
One Day on the Road 어느 날 그 길에서	Hwang Yoon		27 March	3,296	Documentary.
Open City 무방비 도시	Lee Sang-ki	Kim Myung-min; Son Ye-jin	10 January	1,612,803	
Our School's E.T. 울학교 이티	Park Kwang-chun	Kim Soo-ro; Lee Han-wi	11 September	656,089	
Out of My Intention 나도 모르게	Yoo Ji-tae	Jo An; Lee Dae-yeon	20 March		Short film.
The Past is a Strange Country 과거는 낯선 나라다	Kim Eung-su		6 March	178	Documentary. Also known as The Past is a Foreign Country.
Phill Soong Ver 2.0 - The Song on the Road 필승必勝 Ver 2.0 연영석	Tae Joon-sik	Yeon Yeong-seok	6 June	264	Documentary.
Portrait of a Beauty 미인도	Jeon Yun-su	Kim Gyu-ri; Kim Young-ho	13 November	2,361,880	
Public Enemy Returns 강철중: 공공의 적 1-1	Kang Woo-suk	Sul Kyung-gu; Jung Jae-young	19 June	4,197,535	The third film in the Public Enemy series.
Radio Dayz 라듸오 데이즈	Ha Gi-ho	Ryoo Seung-bum; Kim Sa-rang	31 January	214,933	
Ride Away 달려라 자전거	Lim Seong-woon	Han Hyo-joo; Lee Yeong-hoon	7 August	2,169	
Romantic Island 로맨틱 아일랜드	Kang Cheol-woo	Lee Sun-kyun; Eugene	24 December	151,327	
Rough Cut 영화는 영화다	Jang Hoon	So Ji-sub; Kang Ji-hwan	11 September	1,322,435	
Sa-kwa 사과	Kang Yi-kan	Moon So-ri; Kim Tae-woo	16 October	58,331	Originally scheduled for release in 2005.
Santamaria 잘못된 만남	Jung Young-bae	Jung Woong-in; Sung Ji-ru	10 July	47,425	
Scandal Makers 과속 스캔들	Kang Hyeong-cheol	Cha Tae-hyun; Park Bo-young	3 December	8,268,819	
A Secret Scandal 나의 스캔들	Sin Jeong-gyoon	Seo Lin; Lee In	27 March	196	
Shocking Family 쇼킹 패밀리	Kyung-soon		8 May	408	Documentary.
Sleeping Beauty 슬리핑 뷰티	Hanna Lee	Nalie Lee; Kim Ja-yeong	23 October		
Sorry, Dokdo 미안하다 독도야	Choi Hyeon-mook	Kim Jang-hoon	31 December	4,226	Documentary.
Spare 스페어	Lee Seong-han	Jung Woo; Lim Joon-il	28 August	47,579	
Summer Whispers 여름, 속삭임	Kim Eun-joo	Lee Young-eun; Ha Seok-jin	16 October	924	
Sunny 님은 먼곳에	Lee Joon-ik	Soo Ae; Jung Jin-young	23 July	1,804,223	
A Tale of Legendary Libido 가루지기	Sin Han-sol	Bong Tae-gyu; Kim Shin-ah	30 April	272,493	
Three Kingdoms: Resurrection of the Dragon 삼국지: 용의 부활	Daniel Lee	Andy Lau; Maggie Q Sammo Hung	3 April	1,017,672	A joint production between China, Hong Kong and South Korea.
Tokyo! 도쿄!	Michel Gondry; Leos Carax; Bong Joon-ho	Ayako Fujitani; Denis Lavant; Yū Aoi	30 October	13,647	An omnibus film; joint production between France, Japan and South Korea.
Truck 트럭	Kwon Hyung-jin	Yoo Hae-jin; Jin Goo	25 September	542,427	
Unforgettable 서울이 보이냐	Song Dong-yoon	Yoo Seung-ho; Oh Soo-ah	8 May	50,898	
Viva! Love 경축! 우리 사랑	Oh Joum-kyun	Kim Hae-sook; Gi Ju-bong	10 April	12,958	
The Way 길	Kim Seok-woo	Kim Seok-woo	6 November	1,387	Documentary.
What Happened Last Night? 당신이 잠든 사이에	Kim Jeong-min	Ye Ji-won; Tak Jae-hoon	14 August	65,525	Also known as While You Were Sleeping and One Shot.
Written 리튼	Kim Byung-woo	Lee Jin-seok; Kim Bo-yeong	26 December	266	

== See also ==
- 2008 in South Korea
- 2008 in South Korean music
- List of 2008 box office number-one films in South Korea
