= Juhn Jai-hong =

South Korean film director (born 1977)

- Born: 1977 (age 48–49); Seoul, South Korea
- Education: Fiorello H. LaGuardia High School; Webster University Vienna - Business Management
- Occupations: Film director, screenwriter
- Years active: 2004 – present

Korean name
- Hangul: 전재홍
- RR: Jeon Jaehong
- MR: Chŏn Chaehong

Juhn Jai-hong (Korean: 전재홍; born 1977) is a South Korean film director. He directed Beautiful (2008) and Poongsan (2011).

== Career ==
=== Early life ===
Juhn Jai-hong was born in Seoul, and began receiving vocal lessons in the third grade. He moved to the United States at the age of 15 and after graduating from the prestigious Fiorello H. LaGuardia High School, he continued studying the art of singing in Vienna, Austria. Juhn said, "I pursued the path of an opera singer for more than 20 years. I had completed my studies, but felt that classical music limited my expression. I also studied drawing as well, and I felt that cinema was the perfect way to express all these things together." He then studied business management at Webster University Vienna, because he thought it was related to directing, "A director must lead the entire project and all of his cast and crew — it's all about management."

After making the decision to pursue filmmaking, he moved back to New York City, paid US$200 for a hand-held camera and started shooting short films. He said being in Manhattan was a great advantage because there were so many venues to shoot and getting permits was relatively easy. From 2004 to 2007, Juhn shot a total of 14 short films, among which Color competed at the 2005 New York International Independent Film and Video Festival. He said, "I had no fear. I had no knowledge about movies, which was what actually enabled me to do it."

=== Kim Ki-duk protégé ===
Juhn wanted to direct an array of movie genres and styles, like his favorite directors Ang Lee and Jean-Pierre Jeunet. And after being "completely enraptured" by 3-Iron, Juhn called South Korean director Kim Ki-duk his "idol," saying, "He changed my life." He met Kim by chance at the Cannes Film Festival, and told him how he wanted to learn filmmaking from Kim, that it would be better than attending a film school. Kim agreed, so Juhn went back to New York, packed his belongings in eight hours and headed to Seoul. It was his first time in his native country in 14 years.

As Kim Ki-duk's protégé (along with Jang Hoon and Jang Cheol-soo), Juhn honed his directorial skills as an assistant director on Kim's films Time (2006) and Breath (2007). He was also a crew member on Rough Cut (2008) and helped with the online marketing of Dream (2008). In between, Juhn worked on his short film Fish (물고기; Mulgogi), which was later invited to compete in the short film section of the 64th Venice International Film Festival.

=== Beautiful ===
During the post-production for Fish, Kim handed him a synopsis and gave him two months to write the script. Based on Kim Ki-duk's original story, Juhn wrote, directed, and edited his feature film debut Beautiful. Calling it "a dark fairytale for adults that is deeply rooted in reality," Juhn made a film about a woman who becomes the object of men's obsessions and abuse due to her beauty. Played by Cha Soo-yeon, she attempts to uglify herself, from binge eating to starvation. Along the way, a police officer (Lee Chun-hee) constantly watches her, but his sympathy also turns into lustful desire.

Beautiful premiered at the Panorama section of the 58th Berlin International Film Festival, and won the Grand Prix at the 2008 Fukuoka Asian Film Festival. Kim, who produced the film, said "it was good." Beautiful displayed artistic sensibilities and thematic trappings that are automatically identified with Kim, such as explicit expressions of fascination and loathing with the human body, and an examination of ethics and morality through violence. Local critics gave Juhn the nickname "Little Kim Ki-duk" or "Kim Ki-duk Two," but he said the comparisons to his mentor didn't bother him, since he was "still young and have much to learn."

=== Poongsan ===
Juhn said when he came back from Berlin, "Beautiful opened on three screens and disappeared after two weeks. I felt like a loser." Despite his debut film having been invited to international film festivals, Juhn struggled without new projects in Korea.

In 2011, Kim handed him another story idea, because Juhn said Kim "wanted a young director to bring a fresh perspective to inter-Korean issues." Poongsan follows a mysterious messenger (played Yoon Kye-sang) who delivers letters and cherished memorabilia to separated families in North and South Korea. Things take an unexpected turn when the taciturn young man is commissioned with the task of transporting the beautiful lover (Kim Gyu-ri) of a high-ranking Northern official who escaped to the South.

Unlike the perception that he was an arthouse filmmaker, with Poongsan, Juhn hoped to make a film that was first and foremost popcorn entertainment — something young, fun, and edgy. He said, "The film is essentially about reunification, something that any Korean would want. But as much as it's a somber subject, I wanted to keep the film itself touching yet entertaining, something that anyone can enjoy." He hired Tim Starnes as music director, and Juhn's own voice was featured in Robert Schumann's Die Lotosblume. Juhn fought to cast Yoon, a former pop idol, in the lead role, saying he liked Yoon's "piercing gaze" in the film The Moonlight of Seoul and felt they were both "trying to challenge stereotypes."

The action film was shot in 25 takes in just 30 days, including wire action sequences, water stunts, and CGI — all on the low budget of ₩200 million (US$185,580). The entire cast and crew took part in the project with no guarantee. Though used to shooting fast and economically, Juhn admitted filming Poongsan had been difficult, "like trying to climb K2 without oxygen," but that he had "wanted to show that it is possible to make a film with passion rather than money." Critics and film industry professionals were later impressed with the production values.

Again produced by Kim, Juhn's sophomore film received critical acclaim and mostly positive audience feedback. Despite competition from Hollywood film Transformers: Dark of the Moon (which occupied 70% of Korean movie theaters), Poongsan was successful at the box office. It came in third on its opening weekend, drawing over 280,000 viewers, and earned US$5,110,929 in total.

Juhn also made a cameo in Moon Si-hyun's feature directorial debut Sins of Fathers (2011). Moon was another of Kim Ki-duk's protégés, and she and Juhn had known each other since they were studying filmmaking in New York.

According to Juhn, "Kim Ki-duk always says that I must transcend him. It's an extremely burdensome task, but what can I do? All I can do is just to strive forward."

=== Gifted ===
In December 2012, Juhn confirmed that he would direct a remake of 2010 French action-thriller Point Blank starring Ryu Seung-ryong. But Juhn later had creative differences with production company Yong Film regarding The Target, and in September 2013, a press release from distributor CJ E&M stated that he had been replaced by Death Bell director Chang.

Four years after Poongsan, Juhn returned with his third feature film, which he wrote, directed, shot and scored. In Gifted, Kim Beom-joon played a jobless man who develops an appetite for serial killing.

His next project will be a horror film based on the webtoon 0.0MHz.

== Filmography ==
- Color (short film, 2005)
- Fish (short film, 2007)
- Beautiful (2008)
- Poongsan (2011)
- Gifted (2014)
- One Step (2017)
- The Cursed Lesson (2020)
