= Poongsan =

- Theatrical poster
- Hangul: 풍산개
- RR: Pungsangae
- MR: P'ungsan'gae
- Directed by: Juhn Jai-hong
- Written by: Kim Ki-duk
- Produced by: Jeon Yoon-chan; Kim Ki-duk
- Starring: Yoon Kye-sang; Kim Gyu-ri
- Cinematography: Lee Jeong-in
- Edited by: Shin Cheol
- Music by: Park In-young
- Production company: Kim Ki Duk Films
- Distributed by: Next Entertainment World
- Release date: June 23, 2011
- Running time: 121 minutes
- Country: South Korea
- Language: Korean
- Box office: US$5,110,929

Poongsan (Korean: 풍산개; RR: Pungsangae; lit. 'Pungsan dog') is a 2011 South Korean action thriller film directed by Juhn Jai-hong, starring Yoon Kye-sang and Kim Gyu-ri.

Poongsan, whose real name is never revealed, is a mysterious messenger who crosses the demarcation line between the two Koreas, delivering letters and cherished heirlooms between separated families in Seoul and Pyongyang.

One day he is commissioned by South Korean government agents with the task of smuggling in In-ok, the beautiful lover of a high-ranking North Korean defector, into the South. Yet things take an unexpected turn when the deliveryman falls for the young woman, but their romance is put in jeopardy by the obstacles they encounter.

Part love story, part postwar tragedy, with a dose of comedy thrown in, the low-budget film Poongsan depicts the sad reality of the division between the two Koreas.

== Plot ==
A man simply known as "Poongsan" (Yoon Kye-sang) - from the brand of North Korean cigarettes he smokes - makes regular trips across the Korean DMZ, smuggling everything from people to antiques. No one knows whether he is from the North or the South, though from his commando-like abilities he is obviously highly trained. He makes contact with clients via a makeshift memorial-cum-bulletin board for divided families along the DMZ. On one mission he smuggles an antique, as well as a young boy, from North to South; when the smugglers are caught by the police, the South's National Intelligence Service becomes aware of Poongsan's existence. They contract him to bring a young woman, In-ok (Kim Gyu-ri), from Pyongyang to her lover (Kim Jong-soo), a high-ranking North Korean official who recently defected and is still guarded by NIS agents. The arrogant official, who is paranoid about being assassinated, has been holding out on writing a report for the NIS until In-ok joins him. On the journey across the DMZ, In-ok accidentally sets off a mine that almost kills her and Poongsan, and also has to be revived by mouth-to-mouth resuscitation when she almost drowns. The mission is successful but In-ok has become attached to the man who saved her life. Suspicious that the two had sex during the crossing, the official abuses In-ok after they are reunited and she expresses a desire to return to the North. Meanwhile, Poongsan is tortured by an NIS team leader (Choi Mu-seong) to find out whether he is a North Korean agent, but is rescued by the team leader's boss (Han Gi-jung). Poongsan is forced to rescue NIS agent Kim Yong-nam, who's been caught in the North and is under interrogation; in gratitude, and appalled by his own agency's methods, Kim later helps Poongsan escape from the NIS' control. But then Poongsan and In-ok are captured by North Korean agents in the South.

== Cast ==
- Yoon Kye-sang ... Poongsan
- Kim Gyu-ri ... In-ok
- Kim Jong-soo ... North Korean defector
- Han Gi-jung ... section chief
- Choi Moo-sung ... team leader
- Yoo Ha-bok ... North Korean public officer
- Kim Yun-tae ... chief bodyguard
- Joe Odagiri ... North Korean border guard 1 (cameo)
- Kim Young-hoon ... Hit team 4

== Production ==
Written and co-produced by Kim Ki-duk, and directed by his protégé Juhn Jai-hong, the ₩200 million (US$185,580) film was shot over 25 takes in just 30 days, while the entire cast and crew took part in the project with no guarantee. "I wanted to show that it is possible to make a film with passion rather than money," Juhn told reporters at a press preview.

Kim handed Juhn the story idea for Poongsan in fall 2010, saying he wanted a young director to bring a fresh perspective to inter-Korean issues. Juhn, known as an "artsy" filmmaker (his directorial debut Beautiful premiered at Berlin), wanted to make a fun, edgy film that was first and foremost popcorn entertainment. Juhn had to fight to cast Yoon Kye-sang in the lead role, having been impressed by his piercing gaze in The Moonlight of Seoul. Juhn said, "Yoon is only two years younger than I am and we were both trying to challenge stereotypes. Kim Gyu-ri is also our age and it was amazing collaborating with such talented actors."

Juhn, a former opera singer, featured his own voice for Schumann's Die Lotosblume. Tim Starnes, whose credits include The Twilight Saga: Eclipse and the second and third of the Lord of the Rings franchise, edited the soundtrack.
