= David Cho (director) =

South Korean filmmaker (born 1969)

Cho Sung-kyu
- Born: Cho Sung-kyu; March 3, 1969 (age 57); South Korea
- Education: Yonsei University
- Occupations: Film producer, executive producer, director, screenwriter

Korean name
- Hangul: 조성규
- RR: Jo Seonggyu
- MR: Cho Sŏnggyu

Cho Sung-kyu (born March 3, 1969), also known as Sung-kyu Cho, is a South Korean film producer, executive producer, director and screenwriter. Apart from producing and investing in numerous films as CEO of Sponge Entertainment, Cho wrote and directed Second Half (2010), The Heaven Is Only Open to the Single! (2012), The Winter of the Year Was Warm (2012), Santa Barbara (2014), and Planck Constant (2015).

== Career ==
Born in 1969, David Cho first studied history at Yonsei University, then changed his major and graduated with a degree in Mass Communication. He published the film magazine Nega in 1997, then founded the production/distribution company Sponge Entertainment in 2000. As owner and president of Sponge Entertainment, he produced and invested in numerous Korean arthouse films, such as Jang Hoon's Rough Cut, Lee Yoon-ki's My Dear Enemy, Kim Ki-duk's Dream, and E J-yong's Actresses.

In 2010, Cho made his directorial debut with Second Half starring Ryu Seung-soo and Esom, about a beleaguered film producer who meets a waitress in a seaside town and suspects she may be his daughter from a long-ago one-night stand. Cho's second film The Heaven Is Only Open to the Single! (2012) is about a famous actress (played by Choi Yoon-so) who's just been publicly dumped by a comedian and banned by her agency from dating, and an unknown indie musician rejected by a matchmaking service who falls for her onscreen while composing the soundtrack for her film. With a cast of real-life Hongdae musicians led by Lee Neung-ryong of the band Sister's Barbershop, Cho interspersed live musical performances into the film.

Also released in 2012, Cho's third film The Winter of the Year Was Warm focuses on a Seoul-based film producer/director who's fond of the laidback atmosphere in the coastal city of Gangneung, and a nurse who lives in Gangneung but yearns for the cultural life of Seoul; after meeting through a common friend, they each agree to set aside one room in their respective apartments for the other to stay at on weekends, but in sharing their homes with each other, they eventually start to develop a strange sort of in absentia intimacy. The film drew critical acclaim when it premiered at the 17th Busan International Film Festival and as it traveled the international film festival circuit, with particular praise for Cho's nuanced script and use of lighting, as well as Kim Tae-woo and Ye Ji-won's naturalistic acting.

In 2014, Cho cast Lee Sang-yoon and Yoon Jin-seo in his fourth film Santa Barbara (2014). They played, respectively, a music director and a creative director at an advertising agency who fall in love while collaborating on a commercial; after their break-up, they are forced to work together again on a project in Santa Barbara, California, the location of their dream winery tour when they were still a couple.

In a departure from his previous films which blended finely-observed realism and light romance, Cho's Planck Constant (2015) contained more surrealistic and fantasy elements, with Kim Jae-wook playing a man who gets his hair cut 1 millimeter a day, while writing a screenplay in his head.

== Filmography ==
=== As director ===
- Second Half (2010) (also credited as voice cameo)
- The Heaven Is Only Open to the Single! (2012) (also credited in bit part)
- The Winter of the Year Was Warm (2012)
- Santa Barbara (2014)
- Planck Constant (2015) (also credited as music director)
- Life Is but an Empty Dream (2015)
- Two Rooms, Two Nights (2015)
- Croissant (2021)

=== As screenwriter ===
- Second Half (2010)
- The Heaven Is Only Open to the Single! (2012)
- The Winter of the Year Was Warm (2012)
- Santa Barbara (2014)
- Planck Constant (2015)

=== As producer ===
- Geochilmaru: The Showdown (2005)
- Tokyo! (2008)
- Planck Constant (2015)

=== As executive producer ===
- Public Toilet (2002)
- Last Scene (2005)
- On the Road, Two (documentary, 2006)
- The Wonder Years (2007)
- For Eternal Hearts (2007)
- Beautiful (2008)
- Rough Cut (2008)
- My Dear Enemy (2008)
- Dream (2008)
- Iri (2008)
- Oishii Man (2009)
- A Million (2009) (also credited with original idea)
- The Executioner (2009)
- Looking for My Wife (2010)
- Second Half (2010)
- The Winter of the Year Was Warm (2012)

=== As investor ===
- April Snow (2005)
- Ad-lib Night (2006)
- Chongqing (2008)
- Antique (2008)
- Portrait of a Beauty (2008)
- Hello, Schoolgirl (2008)
- Romantic Island (2008)
- A Frozen Flower (2008)
- The Naked Kitchen (2009)
- The Scam (2009)
- My Girlfriend Is an Agent (2009)
- Running Turtle (2009)
- The Case of Itaewon Homicide (2009)
- City of Fathers (2009)
- The Executioner (2009)
- Actresses (2009)
- Vegetarian (2010)
- Looking for My Wife (2010)
- No Doubt (2010)
- Super Monkey Returns (2011)
- Head (2011)
- Venus in Furs (2012)
- Tumbleweed (2013)
