= Oh Yeon-ah =

South Korean actress (born 1981)

- Born: Kim Mi-ae; December 1, 1981 (age 44); Jungnang District, Seoul, South Korea
- Other name: Oh Woo-jeong
- Education: Kaywon University of Art and Design
- Occupation: Actress
- Agent: Prain TPC

Korean name
- Hangul: 김미애
- RR: Gim Miae
- MR: Kim Miae

Stage name
- Hangul: 오연아
- RR: O Yeona
- MR: O Yŏna

Oh Yeon-ah (Korean: 오연아; born December 1, 1981), birth name Kim Mi-ae (김미애), is a South Korean actress. She has played many supporting roles in both films and television series.

== Filmography ==
=== Films ===
Year	Title	Role	Ref.
2007	Miss Gold Digger	Store staff (cameo)	
2007	My Love	Employee at ad company 3 (cameo)	
2008	Open City	Luxury woman (cameo)	
2008	Hellcats	Woman in Won-suk's workshop (cameo)	
2008	The Chaser	Sung-hee	
2008	The Good, the Bad, the Weird	Japanese female train passenger (cameo)	
2008	My Wife Got Married	So-young	
2008	Lost and Found	Female employee (cameo)	
2009	My Girlfriend Is an Agent	Industrial Security Team agent (cameo)	
2009	Goodbye Mom	Min-jung	
2009	The Rennin or Lenin (short film)	Han Mi-woo	
2010	Secret Love	Strange woman	
2010	Rolling Stars	Tom/Roofing (voice)	
2010	Enlightenment Film	Jung Tae-sun	
2013	Way Back Home	Lee Soo-ji	
2015	Minority Opinion	Yoo In-ha	
2015	The Chosen: Forbidden Cave	Ok-ryun	
2016	Asura: The City of Madness	Jung Yoon-hee	
2017	Ordinary Person	Park Sun-hee	

=== Television series ===
Year	Title	Role	Notes	Ref.
2009	Friend, Our Legend			
2012	Take Care of Us, Captain	Jung Soon-ae	Guest	
2012	12 Signs of Love			
2012	KBS TV Novel: "Love, My Love"			
2016	Signal	Yoon Soo-ah	Guest, episode 1-2	
2016	The Royal Gambler	Jang Ok-jung		
2016	The Good Wife	Lee Soo-yeon		
2016	Woman with a Suitcase	Han Ji-won		
2016	Father, I'll Take Care of You	Han Jung-hwa		
2016	The Legend of the Blue Sea	Kang Seo-hee / Kang Ji-hyun / Hong Nan (young)		
2017	Voice	Heo Ji-hye	Guest, episode 1	
2017	Innocent Defendant	Jennifer Lee	Guest, episode 7-8	
2017	The Lady in Dignity	Baek Joo-kyung		
2017	A Korean Odyssey	Egret	Guest, episode 16	
2018	Secret Mother	Kang Hye-kyung		
2018	100 Days My Prince	Queen Park		
2018	Priest	Shin Mi-yeon		
2019	Save Me 2	Jin-sook		
2023	Kokdu: Season of Deity	Ji Soo-yeon		
2023	Revenant	Choi Man-wol	Cameo (episode 2)	

=== Web series ===
Year	Title	Role	Ref.
2023	Bait	Jung So-ram	

=== Variety show ===
Year	Title	Notes	Ref.
2017	Living Together in Empty Room	Room renter (ep.8-11)	

== Awards and nominations ==
Year	Award	Category	Nominated work	Result	Ref.
2010	54th Asia-Pacific Film Festival	Best Supporting Actress	Enlightenment Film	Won	
2016	24th SBS Drama Awards	Special Award, Actress in a Fantasy Drama	The Legend of the Blue Sea	Nominated	
