= Blessing of the Sea =

2019 South Korean television series

- Promotional poster
- Also known as: Protect the Dragon King
- Hangul: 용왕님 보우하사
- Lit.: Protect the King
- RR: Yongwangnim bouhasa
- MR: Yongwangnim pouhasa
- Genre: Melodrama; Comedy; Tragedy
- Written by: Choi Yeon-kul
- Directed by: Choi Eun-kyung
- Starring: Lee So-yeon; Jae Hee; Jo An
- Country of origin: South Korea
- Original language: Korean
- No. of episodes: 121

Production
- Executive producers: Jang Kyung-ik; Kim Woo-taek; Syd Lim
- Producers: MBC C&I
- Running time: 35 minutes

Original release
- Network: MBC
- Release: January 14 – July 12, 2019

Blessing of the Sea (Korean: 용왕님 보우하사) is a 2019 South Korean television series starring Lee So-yeon, Jae Hee, and Jo An. The series aired every Monday to Friday at 19:15 (KST) on MBC.

== Synopsis ==
Shim Cheong-yi, a woman with an absolute vision that reads thousands of colors from all over the world, meets pianist Ma Poong-do who sees the world only in black and white. He shares love and life's beauty, and discovers the secret of her lost father.

== Cast ==
=== Main ===
- Lee So-yeon as Shim Cheong-yi
- Jae Hee as Ma Poong-do
- Jo An as Yeo Ji-na
- Kim Hyung-min as Baek Shi-joon

=== Supporting ===
- Ahn Nae-sang as Shim Hak-kyu (Cheong-yi's feed father )
- Geum Bo-ra as Bang Duk-hee (Cheong-yi's feed mother)
- Ha Eun-jin as Jo Hun-jung (Shi-joon's cousin / Cheong-yi's friend)
- Jun Ah-min as Lee Woo-yang (Hun-jung's husband)
- Lee El-bin as Lee Tae-yang (Hun-jung & Woo Yang's son)
- Oh Mi-yeon as Ma Young-in (Ma Poong-do's grandmother)
- Im Ji-eun as Ma Jae-ran
- Park Jung-hak as Seo Pil-doo
- Lee Seul-ah as Oh Kwi-nyeo (Jae-ran's daughter)
- Yoon Bok-in as Jung Moo-shim (Shi-joon's mother)
- Kim Do-hye as Jung Yeol-mae (Moo-shim's adopted daughter)
- Baek Bo-ram as Go Yong-jung
- Min Chan-ki as Ryan (Poong-do's manager)
- Im Ho as Jo Ji-hwan (Shim Cheong-yi's biological father)

== Ratings ==
In this table, the blue numbers represent the lowest ratings and the red numbers represent the highest ratings.

Ep.	Original broadcast date	Average audience share		
Ep.	Original broadcast date	AGB Nielsen		TNmS
Ep.	Original broadcast date	Nationwide	Seoul	Nationwide
1	January 14, 2019	8.2%	8.2%	9.5%
2	January 15, 2019	8.1%	7.9%	10.5%
3	January 16, 2019	8.9%	9.3%	10.3%
4	January 17, 2019	7.8%	7.8%	10.9%
5	January 18, 2019	8.2%	8.4%	10.7%
6	January 21, 2019	9.0%	9.0%	10.3%
7	January 22, 2019	8.7%	8.1%	11.9%
8	January 23, 2019	8.4%	8.0%	10.2%
9	January 24, 2019	8.1%	8.2%	10.4%
10	January 25, 2019	8.3%	8.4%	10.0%
11	January 28, 2019	8.9%	8.5%	10.8%
12	January 29, 2019	8.1%	7.5%	10.2%
13	January 30, 2019	8.7%	6.3%	6.4%
14	January 31, 2019	8.5%	7.8%	10.9%
15	February 1, 2019	7.8%	7.4%	10.1%
16	February 7, 2019	8.2%	8.2%	9.4%
17	February 8, 2019	7.4%	7.2%	10.1%
18	February 11, 2019	8.0%	7.7%	9.9%
19	February 12, 2019	7.9%	7.4%	9.5%
20	February 13, 2019	7.9%	7.3%	9.3%
121	July 12, 2019	5.7%	6.1%	6.4%
