= The Royal Gambler =

South Korean television series

- Promotional poster
- Also known as: Daebak
- Genre: Historical
- Written by: Kwon Soon-gyu
- Directed by: Nam Geon
- Starring: Jang Keun-suk; Yeo Jin-goo; Jun Kwang-ryul; Choi Min-soo; Yoon Jin-seo; Lim Ji-yeon; Hyun Woo
- Country of origin: South Korea
- Original language: Korean
- No. of episodes: 24

Production
- Producer: Lee Hee-soo
- Running time: 60 minutes
- Production companies: TheKEntertainment; ONDA Entertainment

Original release
- Network: SBS
- Release: March 28 – June 14, 2016

The Royal Gambler (Korean: 대박; Hanja: 大撲; RR: Daebak; lit. Jackpot) is a South Korean historical drama starring Jang Keun-suk, Yeo Jin-goo, Jun Kwang-ryul, Choi Min-soo, Yoon Jin-seo, and Lim Ji-yeon. It replaced Six Flying Dragons and aired on SBS on Mondays and Tuesdays at 22:00 (KST) from March 28, 2016, to June 14, 2016, for 24 episodes.

== Plot ==
This drama is about a prince who is forced to live as a commoner and uses his gambling skills to take revenge on the King. Dae-Gil (Jang Geun-suk) and King Yeongjo (Yeo Jin-goo) enter a match. Dae-Gil bets his life and King Yeongjo bets the entire Kingdom of Joseon on the outcome. Dae-Gil is the best gambler in the Joseon era. He holds deep resentment inside, but is also cool on the exterior. King Yeongjo is a man who never lowers his head without a convincing reason. Meanwhile, Dam-Seo (Lim Ji-yeon) exists solely to take revenge upon the king.

It is a fictionalised account of events leading to the accession of the throne by King Yeongjo, and also a fictionalised account of the 1728 Musin Rebellion.

== Cast ==
=== Main cast ===
- Jang Geun-suk as Baek Dae-gil
- Yeo Jin-goo as Prince Yeoning (King Yeongjo)
- Jun Kwang-ryul as Lee In-jwa
- Choi Min-soo as King Sukjong
- Yoon Jin-seo as Consort Suk
- Lim Ji-yeon as Dam-seo
- Hyun Woo as Yoon (King Gyeongjong)

=== Supporting cast ===
- Im Hyun-sik as Nam Dokkebi
- Ahn Gil-kang as Kim Che-gun
- Song Jong-ho as Kim Yi-soo
- Ji Il-joo as Moo-myung
- Han Jung-soo as Hwang Jin-gi
- Han Ki-woong as Sa Woon
- Han Ki-won as Sa Mo
- Oh Yeon-ah as Jang Ok-jung
- Yoon Ji-hye as Hong-Mae
- Lee Moon-sik as Baek Man-geum
- Jeon Soo-jin as Hwanggoo Mom
- Kim Yoo-chul as Daegari
- Jun Jae-hyung as Gamoolchi
- Baek Seung-hyeon as Jang Hee-jae (Jang Ok-jung's brother)
- Heo Tae-hee as Sang-gil (Yeongjo's bodyguard)
- Lee Ga-hyun as Hwa-jin
- Cha Soon-bae as Jo Tae-gu
- Na Jae-woong as Choi Seok-hang
- Kim Ga-eun as Gye Sul-im
- Kim Sung-oh as Hwanghae-do's Gaejakdoo
- Hong Ah-reum as Yeon Hwa

== Ratings ==
In the table below, the blue numbers represent the lowest ratings and the red numbers represent the highest ratings.

Episode #	Original broadcast date	Average audience share			
Episode #	Original broadcast date	TNmS Ratings		AGB Nielsen	
Episode #	Original broadcast date	Nationwide	Seoul National Capital Area	Nationwide	Seoul National Capital Area
1	March 28, 2016	9.5%	11.1%	11.8%	13.0%
2	March 29, 2016	9.9%	11.0%	12.2%	13.7%
3	April 4, 2016	9.1%	10.1%	11.6%	12.5%
4	April 5, 2016	8.9%	10.4%	9.5%	10.4%
5	April 11, 2016	8.6%	10.4%	9.2%	9.8%
6	April 12, 2016	8.0%	10.2%	8.4%	9.3%
7	April 18, 2016	8.1%	9.3%	9.1%	8.9%
8	April 19, 2016	7.7%	9.2%	8.7%	9.1%
9	April 25, 2016	8.2%	9.5%	8.0%	8.5%
10	April 26, 2016	8.1%	9.5%	8.9%	9.7%
11	May 2, 2016	8.3%	10.5%	8.9%	9.4%
12	May 3, 2016	8.8%	10.8%	9.2%	9.8%
13	May 9, 2016	8.5%	9.8%	8.7%	9.3%
14	May 10, 2016	8.6%	11.3%	8.4%	8.8%
15	May 16, 2016	8.1%	9.4%	8.4%	8.3%
16	May 17, 2016	8.0%	8.8%	9.6%	10.4%
17	May 23, 2016	7.5%	8.7%	9.5%	10.5%
18	May 24, 2016	7.6%	8.6%	8.5%	8.8%
19	May 30, 2016	7.6%	9.3%	7.7%	7.8%
20	May 31, 2016	6.8%	7.9%	8.1%	8.1%
21	June 6, 2016	8.6%	10.2%	10.3%	11.4%
22	June 7, 2016	8.9%	10.8%	9.9%	10.0%
23	June 13, 2016	8.6%	10.3%	9.2%	9.1%
24	June 14, 2016	9.0%	10.6%	10.0%	10.2%
Average		8.4%	9.9%	9.3%	9.9%

== Original soundtrack ==
The Royal Gambler OST

Soundtrack album by Various artists
- Recorded: 2016
- Genre: Soundtrack
- Language: Korean
- Label: Loen Entertainment

=== OST Part 1 ===
Released date April 06,2016
No.	Title	Artist	Length
1.	"Time Stops (시간이 멈추면)"	Park Wan-kyu	4:07
2.	"Time Stops (시간이 멈추면)" (Inst.)		4:07
Total length:			8:14

=== OST Part 2 ===
Released date April 19, 2016
No.	Title	Artist	Length
1.	"I Miss You (그리워)"	Kim Bo-hyung (Spica)	3:32
2.	"I Miss You (그리워)" (Inst.)		3:32
Total length:			7:04

=== OST Part 3 ===
Released date April 26, 2016
No.	Title	Artist	Length
1.	"I Want To Love You (사랑하고 싶다)"	Postmen	4:17
2.	"I Want To Love You (사랑하고 싶다)" (Inst.)		4:17
Total length:			8:34

=== OST Part 4 ===
Released date May 19, 2016
No.	Title	Artist	Length
1.	"Same Wish (같은 소원)"	Cheon Dan-bi	4:02
2.	"Same Wish (같은 소원)" (Inst.)		4:02
Total length:			8:04

== International broadcast ==
In the United States, the drama airs in the Los Angeles DMA free, over-the-air on LA 18 KSCI-TV (channel 18) with English subtitles, Mon-Tue 9:15PM, from April 25 to July 12, 2016.

== Awards and nominations ==
Year	Award	Category	Recipient	Result
2016	5th APAN Star Awards	Top Excellence Award, Actor in a Serial Drama	Choi Min-soo	Nominated
2016	5th APAN Star Awards	Excellence Award, Actor in a Serial Drama	Jang Keun-suk	Nominated
2016	SBS Drama Awards	Grand Prize (Daesang)	Jang Keun-suk	Nominated
2016	SBS Drama Awards	Top Excellence Award, Actor in a Serial Drama	Jang Keun-suk	Won
2016	SBS Drama Awards	Top Excellence Award, Actor in a Serial Drama	Choi Min-soo	Nominated
2016	SBS Drama Awards	Top Excellence Award, Actress in a Serial Drama	Yoon Jin-seo	Nominated
2016	SBS Drama Awards	Excellence Award, Actor in a Serial Drama	Yeo Jin-goo	Won
2016	SBS Drama Awards	Best Couple Award	Jang Keun-suk and Yeo Jin-goo	Nominated
2016	SBS Drama Awards	Top 10 Stars Award	Jang Keun-suk	Won
2016	SBS Drama Awards	Idol Academy Award – Best "Drudge"	Jang Keun-suk	Nominated
2016	SBS Drama Awards	Idol Academy Award – Best Eating	Jun Kwang-ryul	Nominated
