= Kim Sang-man =

South Korean film director

- Born: January 28, 1970 (age 55); South Korea
- Occupations: Film director, art director

Korean name
- Hangul: 김상만
- RR: Gim Sangman
- MR: Kim Sangman

Kim Sang-man (Korean: 김상만; born January 28, 1970) is a South Korean film director and art director.

== Career ==
Kim Sang-man began his career in films designing posters, starting with The Contact in 1997. He had designed posters for about 30 films when he was given the opportunity to be the art director on If the Sun Rises in the West in 1998. The highlight of his career as an art director came two years after that when he worked on the now-classic Joint Security Area. Some time afterwards, Kim joined a band as a bassist and recorded under an independent label. Because of this, in the next film he worked on, Bloody Tie in 2006, he held two positions: art director and film score composer/music director. In 2008, he directed his first film, the crime caper/comedy Girl Scout which was fairly well received. He wrote and directed his sophomore feature, the 2010 thriller Midnight FM. Kim reunited with Midnight FM actor Yoo Ji-tae for his third film The Tenor – Lirico Spinto, a 2014 biopic of South Korean tenor Bae Jae-chul.

== Filmography ==
=== As director ===
- Girl Scout (2008) - director, music
- Midnight FM (2010) - director, screenplay
- The Tenor – Lirico Spinto (2014) - director, screenplay
- Uprising (2024) - director
- Pigpen (2025) - director, screenwriter

=== As art director ===
- Bloody Tie (2006) - art director, music, sound department
- Joint Security Area (2000) - art director
- Happy End (1999) - art director
- If the Sun Rises in the West (1998) - art director

=== As crew ===
- Battlefield Heroes (2011) - art department
- Paju (2009)
- Voice of a Murderer (2007)
- My Wife Is a Gangster 3 (2006)
- The Restless (2006)
- I'm a Cyborg, But That's OK (2006)
- The Fox Family (2006)
- The Host (2006)
- Barefoot Ki-bong (2006)
- Blue Swallow (2005)
- Typhoon (2005)
- Bystanders (2005)
- Love Talk (2005)
- Blossom Again (2005)
- You Are My Sunshine (2005)
- Short Time (2005)
- Sympathy for Lady Vengeance (2005)
- Heaven's Soldiers (2005)
- Voice (2005)
- Rules of Dating (2005)
- A Bold Family (2005)
- Hello, Brother (2005)
- Blood Rain (2004)
- The President's Last Bang (2005)
- A Moment to Remember (2004)
- Bunshinsaba (2004)
- The President's Barber (2004)
- The Big Swindle (2004)
- Dance with Solitude (Sweet Sixties) (2004)
- A Good Lawyer's Wife (2003)
- Who R U? (2002)
- L'Abri (Bus Stop) (2001)
