= Running Wild (2006 film) =

- Theatrical release poster
- Hangul: 야수
- Hanja: 野獸
- RR: Yasu
- MR: Yasu
- Directed by: Kim Sung-soo
- Written by: Kim Sung-soo; Han Ji-hoon
- Produced by: Han Seong-gu
- Starring: Kwon Sang-woo; Yoo Ji-tae
- Cinematography: Choi Sang-mook
- Edited by: Ko Im-pyo
- Music by: Kenji Kawai
- Distributed by: Showbox
- Release date: January 12, 2006
- Running time: 124 minutes
- Country: South Korea
- Language: Korean
- Budget: US$5 million
- Box office: US$6.24 million

Running Wild (Korean: 야수; RR: Yasu) is a 2006 South Korean action thriller film directed by Kim Sung-soo. This film was released on 12 January 2006. The film stars Kwon Sang-woo and Yoo Ji-tae.

== Plot ==
Jang Do-young is a homicide detective who likes to use violence when dealing with criminals, while Oh Jin-woo is a prosecutor who believes in the importance of data and evidence. After the murder of his younger half-brother, Do-young and Jin-woo meet when Do-young interrupts a stakeout in an attempt at vengeance. The unlikely duo join forces to bring gangster boss Yu Kang-jin to justice, but find that he is too well connected. Being unsuccessful in bringing Yu Kang-jin to justice the duo turn to violence in order to bring him down.

== Cast ==
- Kwon Sang-woo as Jang Do-young
- Yoo Ji-tae as Oh Jin-woo
- Son Byong-ho as Yu Kang-jin
- Lee Joo-sil
- Kang Sung-jin
- Jeong Won-joong
- Uhm Ji-won
- Choi Deok-moon as Inspector Park
- Jo Sung-ha
- Kim Yoon-seok
- Ahn Gil-kang

== Release ==
Running Wild was released in South Korea on 12 January 2006, and on its opening weekend was ranked second at the box office with 389,370 admissions. The film went on to receive a total of 1,016,152 admissions nationwide, with a gross (as of 5 February 2006) of US$6,245,863.
