= The Tenor – Lirico Spinto =

- Hangul: 더 테너 – 리리코 스핀토
- RR: Deo teneo – ririko seupinto
- MR: Tŏ t'enŏ – ririk'o sŭp'int'o
- Directed by: Kim Sang-man
- Written by: Kim Sang-man; Choi Jong-hyeon; Kim Gwan-bin
- Produced by: Kim Jeong-a
- Starring: Yoo Ji-tae; Yusuke Iseya; Cha Ye-ryun
- Cinematography: Ju Seong-rim
- Edited by: Shin Min-kyung
- Music by: Kim Jun-seong
- Production company: More In Group
- Distributed by: BoXoo Entertainment
- Release dates: June 19, 2014 (Shanghai International Film Festival); December 31, 2014 (South Korea)
- Running time: 114 minutes
- Countries: South Korea; Japan; Serbia
- Language: Korean
- Box office: US$296,634

The Tenor – Lirico Spinto (Korean: 더 테너 – 리리코 스핀토) is a 2014 South Korean-Japanese musical biographical drama film directed by Kim Sang-man. This film telling about chronicling the life of South Korean tenor Bae Jae-chul who performed in numerous European operas, but lost his voice at the peak of his career due to thyroid cancer. However, after enduring a long period of painful rehabilitation, with the help of his wife Yoon-hee as well as his longtime friend and Japanese producer Koji Sawada, Bae regained his singing ability and half his vocal range. Bae was portrayed by Yoo Ji-tae.

The film premiered at the 17th Shanghai International Film Festival, and was released in South Korea on December 31, 2014.

== Storyline ==
This movie is based on BAE Jae-cheol, a Korean opera tenor recognized even in Europe. After hearing the famous BAE's voice himself, Japanese music producer Sawada Kohji wants to have him on stage in Japan. At first, BAE, who was already doing great, did not show much interest in Kohji's proposal, but, later on, moves the audience's hearts by singing passionately on the Japanese stage. One day, BAE hears devastating news. He is diagnosed with cancer and has to go through an operation affecting the vocal cords in order to save his life, which will prevent him from singing after the surgery. The tenor gets the surgery to live but is left miserable as he can no longer sing. Sawada Kohji suggests an operation that will recover BAE's voice.

== Cast ==
- Yoo Ji-tae as Bae Jae-chul
- Yusuke Iseya as Koji Sawada
- Cha Ye-ryun as Yoon-hee
- Nataša Tapušković
- Marko Stojanović

== Production ==
The film's early working title was Miracle, but director Kim Sang-man changed it because he thought it disclosed the ending, while he hoped the unfamiliar term lirico spinto would arouse Korean viewers' curiosity. Lirico spinto, Italian for "pushed lyric", refers to a tenor voice that is versatile enough to sing in the style of a lirico, a singer with a softer voice and a spinto, one with dramatic voice; Bae could do both. For his role, actor Yoo Ji-tae practiced singing every day for more than a year and underwent further vocal training to acquire the technique to believably lip sync every opera song he sings in the film; he also took English lessons.

Due to budget constraints, it took six years for the film to be completed. The production crew filmed in Korea, Japan and Serbia for 18 months.

== Awards and nominations ==
Year	Award	Category	Recipient	Result
2015	52nd Grand Bell Awards	Best Music	Kim Jun-seong	Won
2015	52nd Grand Bell Awards	Best Sound Recording	Gong Tae-won	Nominated
