= Park Ji-ah (actress, born 1972) =

South Korean actress (1972–2024)

- 박지아
- Born: February 25, 1972; Seoul, South Korea
- Died: September 30, 2024 (aged 52); Seoul, South Korea
- Other name: Park Ji-a
- Education: Seoul Institute of the Arts (Bachelor in Arts)
- Occupation: Actress
- Years active: 1998–2024
- Agent: Jflex

Korean name
- Hangul: 박지아
- RR: Bak Jia
- MR: Pak Chia

Park Ji-ah (Korean: 박지아; February 25, 1972 – September 30, 2024) was a South Korean actress. She made recurring appearances in Kim Ki-duk's films, having had roles in five of his works from 2002 to 2008. Her performance in Breath was described as "terrific" by Variety and "a joy to watch" by Twitch Film.

== Death ==
On September 30, 2024, Park died after suffering an ischemic stroke. She was 52. After Park's funeral on October 2 at the Asan Medical Center, she was buried at Kapsan Park Cemetery in Yangpyeong, Gyeonggi Province, South Korea. Yeom Hye-ran attended the interment while Song Hye-kyo offered a funeral wreath.

== Filmography ==
=== Film ===
Year	Title	Role
1998	Jugineun Iyagi	Park Ji-ah
2001	Bus, l'abri	Ms. Hong
2002	Oollala Sisters	Mi-soo
2002	The Coast Guard	Mi-yeong
2003	Spring, Summer, Fall, Winter and Spring	The baby's mother
2004	3-Iron	Ji-ah
2007	Breath	Yeon
2007	Epitaph	Mother
2008	Dream	Jin's former lover
2009	A Blind River	Seong-nyeo
2010	A Little Pond	Jjang-i's aunt
2011	Mama	Dong-hee
2012	The Weight	Dong-bae
2012	Masquerade	Lady Han, chief court lady
2014	Gifted	Cafe owner
2015	Girl on the Edge	Choi Min-jeong
2015	Seoul Searching	Han Jong-ok
2017	The Tooth and the Nail	Madam Sung
2018	Gonjiam: Haunted Asylum	Hospital director / Director's ghost
2019	Scent of a Ghost	Team leader
2020	The Closet	Shaman
2022	Through My Midwinter	Kyeong-hak's aunt

=== Television series ===
Year	Title	Role
2014	Quiz of God 4	Seo Yeon-joo
2014	Ballerino	Choi Dan-jang
2015	Unkind Ladies	Vocalist
2015	KBS Drama Special: "Contract Man"	In Ja
2016	The Doctors	Lee Ga-jin
2016	The Good Wife	Medical staff
2017	Suspicious Partner	Park Seong-eun
2017	Circle	Woman waiting for bus (ep. 1)
2017	Judge vs. Judge	Jang Soon-bok
2017	The Rebel	Jin-soo
2018	The Guest	Believer Kim
2022	Cleaning Up	Seok-soon
2022	Bloody Heart	Court Lady Han
2022	The Glory	Jung Mi-hee
2023	The Glory 2	Jung Mi-hee
2025	Dear Hongrang	Lady Gwigokja
