= Midnight FM =

- Hangul: 심야의 FM
- Hanja: 深夜의 FM
- RR: Simyaui FM
- MR: Simyaŭi FM
- Directed by: Kim Sang-man
- Written by: Kim Sang-man; Kim Hwi
- Produced by: Je Jeong-hun; Kim Hong-baek; Je Jeong-hun
- Starring: Soo Ae; Yoo Ji-tae
- Cinematography: Kim Tae-gyeong
- Edited by: Shin Min-kyung
- Music by: Kim Jun-seong
- Distributed by: Lotte Entertainment
- Release date: October 14, 2010
- Running time: 106 minutes
- Country: South Korea
- Language: Korean
- Box office: US$8,101,240 (South Korea)

Midnight FM (Korean: 심야의 FM; RR: Simyaui FM) is a 2010 South Korean action thriller film by Kim Sang-man starring Soo Ae and Yoo Ji-tae.

Soo Ae won Best Actress at the 31st Blue Dragon Film Awards for her performance.

== Plot ==
Ko Sun-young is a popular television announcer and midnight DJ on a show that mixes film analysis with selected songs from the associated soundtracks. Sun-young decides to quit her job after her daughter, Eun-soo, requires heart surgery that is only available in the United States. On her last day of work, Sun-young's sister Ah-young babysits Eun-soo at Sun-young's apartment. While she is on the air, Sun-young receives a call from a man named Han Dong-soo, who claims to be her fan. Inspired by Travis Bickle, the unstable vigilante from Taxi Driver, Dong-soo has begun to murder pimps and drug dealers throughout the city. When he hears about Sun-young's imminent retirement, he takes her family hostage and demands that she retool her final broadcast to his specifications. However, Sun-young's boss discards the new playlist on the assumption that Sun-young herself submitted it.

When Sun-young does not follow his instructions and instead calls the police, Dong-soo murders the policemen that arrive and cuts off one of Ah-young's toes. With the help of Son Deok-tae, an awkward, obsessed fan, Sun-young attempts to recreate her first broadcasts. When her boss intervenes, Dong-soo murders Ah-young. Furious and in shock, Sun-young explains the situation to her confused co-workers. Dong-soo forces Sun-young to quote her previous commentary on Taxi Driver, in which she requests a hero like Bickle to arise, and demands that she call him a hero; she reluctantly does so. Meanwhile, Sun-young tries to sneak out of the studio to rescue her daughter, but Dong-soo has already fled the house. Sun-young chases after him, and Dong-soo leads her to where he has kidnapped a man he claims to be a human trafficker. The man denies the charge and begs for his life. Dong-soo orders Sun-young to kill the man, but she refuses. Sun-young says that the man deserves a trial, and she shoots Dong-soo instead.

== Cast ==
- Soo Ae as Ko Sun-young
- Yoo Ji-tae as Han Dong-soo
- Ma Dong-seok as Son Deok-tae
- Jung Man-sik as Oh Jung-moo
- Kim Min-kyu as Yang Woo-han
- Choi Song-hyun as Park Kyung-yang
- Shin Da-eun as Ko Ah-young
- Lee Joon-ha as Ko Eun-soo
- Choi Hee-won as Ko Hyun-ji
- Jo Suk-hyun as Detective Jo
- Kwak Do-won as Jang Suk-hyun
- Uhm Tae-goo as Detective Uhm
- Chae Hee-jae as Detective Chae
- Lee Sang-hong as Yang Bok-nam
- Kim Byung-soon as Director
- Kim Yun-tae as Visit police officer
- Lee Hyun-geol as Kim Tae-soo
- Kim Gyu-sun as Younger sister of man in suit
- Yoon Hee-won as Senior anchor
- Park Tae-kyung as Drunk man
- Song Ji-in as Young woman
- Kim Shin-young as Studio DJ (cameo)
- Kim Hyun-ah as Studio guest (cameo)
- Son Ji-hyun as Studio guest (cameo)

== Release ==
Midnight FM was released October 14, 2010, in South Korea. The international premiere was at the Hawaii International Film Festival ten days later.

== Reception ==
Darcy Paquet of Screen International called it "a better-than-average Korean thriller that despite its plot holes, manages to maintain the tension all the way through." Shelagh Rowan-Legg of Twitch Film wrote, "Midnight FM can easily be added not only to the radio film canon, but also to the slate of great thrillers being produced in recent years in South Korea." James Mudge of Beyond Hollywood wrote, "Certainly, director Kim's enthusiasm makes up for any lack of originality, and thanks to a fine script, fast pace and the efforts of the headlining stars, it stands as one of the best and most fun Korean thrillers of the last year or so."

== Awards and nominations ==
Award	Category	Recipient	Result
6th University Film Festival of Korea	Best Actress	Soo Ae	Won
8th Max Movie Awards	Best Actress	Soo Ae	Nominated
47th Baeksang Arts Awards	Best Actress	Soo Ae	Nominated
31st Blue Dragon Film Awards	Best Actress	Soo Ae	Won
31st Blue Dragon Film Awards	Best Music	Kim Jun-seong	Nominated
