= Out of My Intention =

- Theatrical poster
- Directed by: Yoo Ji-tae
- Written by: Yoo Ji-tae
- Produced by: Yoo Ji-tae
- Starring: Lee Dae-yeon; Jo An
- Cinematography: Choe Sang-muk
- Edited by: Moon In-dae
- Music by: Jo Yeong-wook
- Distributed by: Indie Story
- Release date: March 20, 2008
- Running time: 24 minutes
- Country: South Korea
- Language: Korean
- Box office: US$2,027

Out of My Intention (Korean: 나도 모르게; RR: Nado moreuge) is a 2008 South Korean short film written and directed by Yoo Ji-tae. It is the third short film by actor-turned-director Yoo, and the first of his films to receive a public release. Lee Dae-yeon and Jo An star as the film's only characters.

== Plot summary ==
An unnamed middle-aged man (Lee Dae-yeon) drives listlessly through downtown Seoul on a downcast summer afternoon, with the view outside, periodically glimpsed through the car windows, fuzzy and blurred. Sitting in the passenger seat next to him is Ok-gyeong (Jo An), a young woman some twenty years younger than he is. Although their dialogue is scarcely distinguishable with regard to its content, the two are engaged in a typical lover's quarrel. The woman is desperate to talk through their problems, but the man remains silent. Their drive along the highway is interrupted by memories of the past, which include dates taken by the lovers in the countryside, and surreal fantasy scenes where Ok-gyeong has her face painted like a mime artist.

== Production and casting ==
Out of My Intention is the third directorial project by Yoo Ji-tae, following his earlier short films Bike Boy and How Does the Blind Dream. Regarding the brevity and ambiguity afforded by the short film format, Yoo said, "If I had made the film into a full feature, I would have had to give all of the sundry reasons and episodes about their initial relationships". Actor Lee Dae-yeon admitted to being "a bit baffled" by the film's script, but felt compelled to take the part after Yoo told him it had been written with him in mind.

== Themes and interpretations ==
Like Yoo's earlier shorts, the central theme in Out of My Intention is one of love. The film is a blend of past and present; though the two characters talk to each other constantly, the camera almost never captures them together in one frame. The man is actually "driving down memory lane" and reminiscing about his first love, his thoughts conjuring her back to life. While he has grown old and weary, Ok-gyeong remains young in his heart, suggesting that first love never dies.

== Release ==
The press preview for Out of My Intention received an unusual level of interest, much to the surprise of director Yoo Ji-tae. The first of his films to be released theatrically, it opened on March 20, 2008 at the Gwanghwamun Spongehouse in Seoul, where it was given a limited screening. At the South Korean box office, Out of My Intention peaked at 42 over its opening weekend, and as of April 6, 2008, it had grossed a total of US$2,027.

In June 2008, Out of My Intention was screened at the Short Shorts Film Festival in Tokyo, where director Yoo won the Special Mention Award. It later competed at the Mise-en-scène Short Film Festival, held from June to July 2008, the New York Korean Film Festival in August 2008, the Vancouver International Film Festival from September to October 2008, and the Asiana International Short Film Festival in November 2008.

== Critical response ==
Lee Hyo-won of The Korea Times described Out of My Intention as an "audiovisual poem," albeit a "rough draft," and noted the director's "ability to orchestrate subtle emotions" in spite of the film's short running time, going on to say, "Yoo takes full advantage of the film medium, creating an ambiance from what is included and excluded in the mise-en-scene." The review also praised the contribution of the cast, saying, "Lee gives the film a nice gravitational pull, weighing down the fluffy parts, while fresh actress Jo An... embodies youthful vigor and beauty.
