= Yun Tongju =

Korean national poet (1917–1945)

Yun Dong-ju
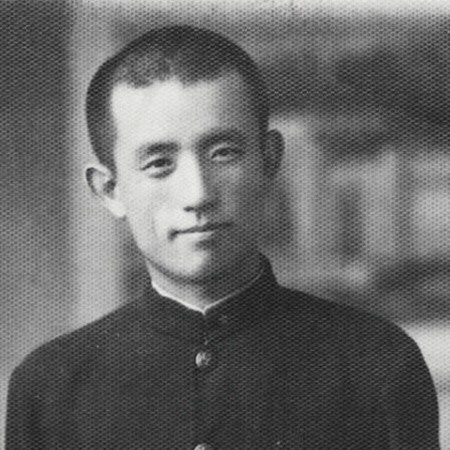
- Yun in 1942
- Born: 30 December 1917; Lung-ching, Chi-lin, Republic of China
- Died: 16 February 1945 (aged 27); Fukuoka Prison, Fukuoka, Empire of Japan
- Resting place: Longjing, Jilin, China
- Education: Yonhi College
- Alma mater: Rikkyo University (dropped out); Doshisha University (expelled)
- Occupation: Poet
- Writing career
- Language: Korean
- Genre: Poem
- Notable works: 《하늘과 바람과 별과 詩》(Sky, Wind, Star and Poem)

Korean name
- Hangul: 윤동주
- Hanja: 尹東柱
- RR: Yun Dongju
- MR: Yun Tongju

Art name
- Hangul: 해환
- Hanja: 海煥
- RR: Haehwan
- MR: Haehwan
- Website: yoondongju.yonsei.ac.kr/yoondongju_m/index.do

Yun Dong-ju or Yoon Dong-ju (Korean: 윤동주, Korean pronunciation: [jundoŋdʑu]; 30 December 1917 – 16 February 1945) was a Korean poet. He is known for his lyric poetries and for his poems dedicated to the Korean independence movement against the Empire of Japan.

Yun was born in Longjing, Jilin, China. After studying at the Myeongdong School, he moved to Pyongyang and graduated from Soongsil Middle School (now Soongsil High School in Seoul). He later moved to Seoul and attended Yonhi College. During his second year at Yonhi College, he published a poem in the boy magazine, and officially appeared in the paragraph. In 1942, he went to Japan and entered the English Literature Department at Rikkyo University, but later that year, he transferred to the English Literature Department at Doshisha University. But was arrested by the Japanese police for alleged anti-Japanese movements in 1943. While imprisoned in Fukuoka, he died at the age of 27, leaving over 100 poems. His cause of death in a Fukuoka prison is uncertain, but theories have been raised based on accounts of saltwater injections and medical experiments performed at that prison. His book, The Sky, the Wind, the Stars, and the Poem (하늘과 바람과 별과 詩), was published posthumously.

He was recognized as one of the conscientious intellectuals in the latter half of the Japanese colonial period, and his poems were based on criticism and self-reflection of the Japanese colonial government and the Joseon Governor-General. His cousin and close friend, Song Mong-gyu, was arrested while attempting to join the independence movement and was subjected to Japanese experimentation in Japan. While in Japan, he adopted the Japanese name, Hiranuma (平沼). In addition to his Korean name, the nicknames Dongju and Yunju were also used.

== Biography ==
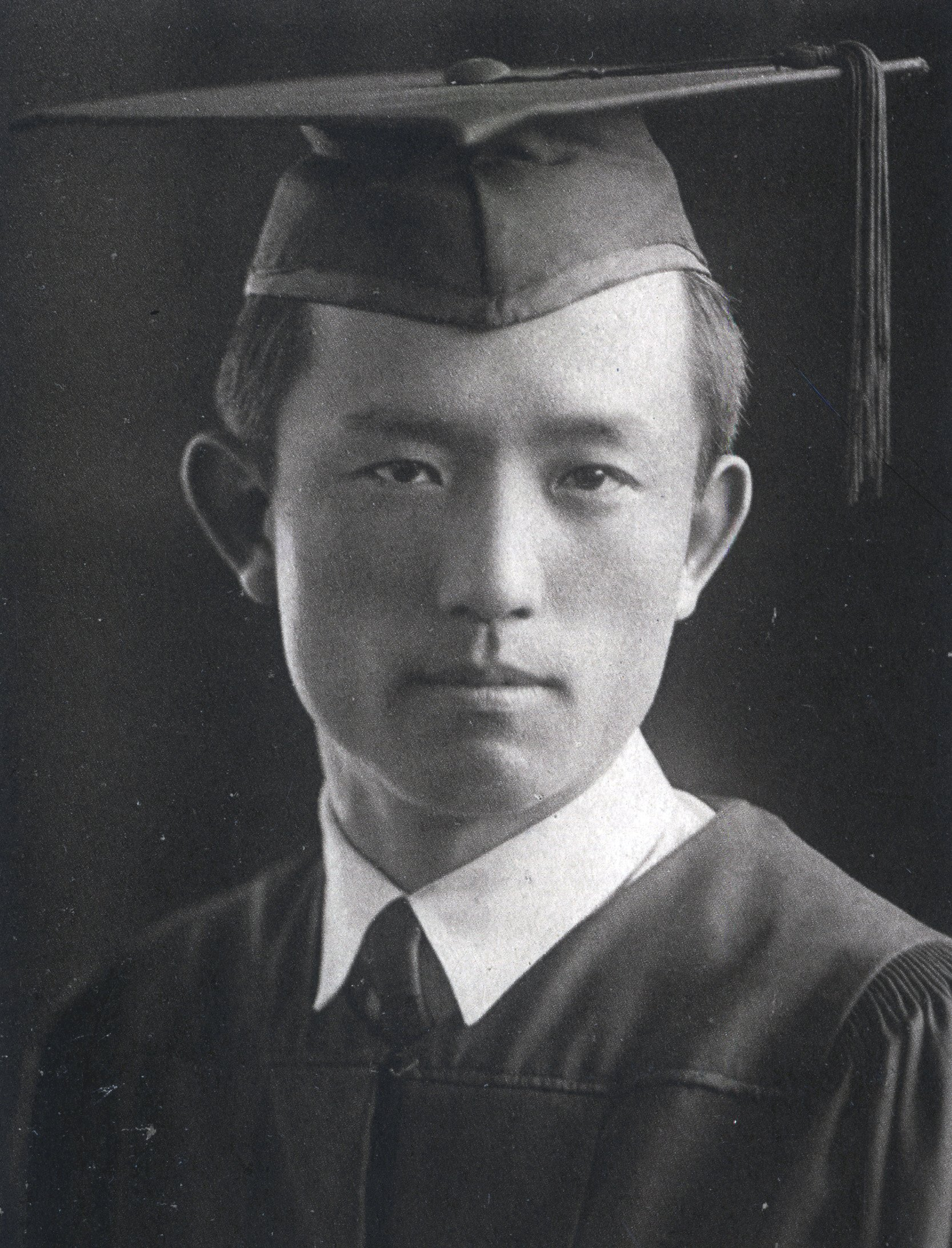
Yun Dong-ju's graduation picture from Yonhi College (1941)

Yun Dong-ju was born as the eldest son among the four children of his father Yun Yeong-seok and his mother Kim Yong at Mingdong village (also known as Myeongdong-chon) in Longjing, where many Korean settlers in China lived during the Japanese occupation of Korea. As a child, he was called "Haehwan" (해환, 海煥 [hɛːhwan]). He entered Eunjin Middle School in Longjing in 1932 and moved to Pyeongyang to attend Soongsil Middle School in 1936. When the school was closed down in the same year he moved back to Longjing. On 27 December 1941, aged 23, he graduated from Yonhi College, in Seoul which later became Yonsei University.

He had been writing poetry from time to time and chose 19 poems to publish in a collection he intended to call "Sky, Wind, Star, and Poem" (하늘과 바람과 별과 시), but he was unable to get it published.

After crossing over to Japan, entering Kyoto Doshisha University in 1942, arrested by the Japanese police for an independence movement in 1943, imprisoned in a Fukuoka prison, leaving over 100 poems and died in prison at the age of 27. The view that the signing of the Japanese saltwater Vivo and after his death the Japanese by Maruta is uncertain, but raising theories, biological experiments.

The government of South Korea recognized Yun Dong-ju's contributions to the independence movement by awarding him the Order of Merit for National Foundation (Independence Medal) on August 15, 1990.

== Legacy ==
In 1948 three collections of his handwritten manuscripts were published posthumously as "The Heavens and the Wind and the Stars and Poetry" (Haneulgwa Baramgwa Byeolgwa Si). With the appearance of this volume Yun came into the spotlight as a Resistance poet of the late occupation period.

In November 1968, Yonsei University and others established an endowment for the Yun Tong-ju Poetry Prize. In 2007, he was listed by the Korean Poets' Association among the ten most important modern Korean poets.

== Work ==
The Literature Translation Institute of Korea summarizes Yun's contributions to Korean literature:

Yun’s poetry is notable for the childlike persona of his narrators, sensitive awareness of a lost hometown, and an unusual scapegoat mentality deriving from a sense of shame at not being able to lead a conscientious life in a period of gloomy social realities. "Life and Death" (Salmgwa jugeum) is representative of the poems dating from 1934 to 1936, his period of literary apprenticeship. It describes the conflict between life and death, or light and darkness, but its poetic framework is more or less crude. From 1937 onwards, however, his poems reveal ruthless introspection and anxiety about the dark realities of the times. The poems of this later period reach clear literary fruition in terms of their reflection on the inner self and their recognition of nationalist realities, as embodied in the poet's own experiences. In particular, they evince a steely spirit that attempts to overcome anxiety, loneliness, and despair and to surmount contemporary realities through hope and courage.

=== Collection of poems ===
- New Myeong-dong
- Another Hometown
- Sky, Wind, Star, and Poem
- Those Who love the stars
- One Night I Count the Stars

etc...

== Sky, Wind, Star and Poem ==
In January 1948, 31 of his poems were published by Jeongeumsa (정음사, 正音社), together with an introduction by the fellow poet Chong Ji-yong; this work was also titled Sky, Wind, Star, and Poem (하늘과 바람과 별과 시). His poetry had a huge impact. In 1976, Yun's relatives collected his other poems and added them to a third edition of the book. The poems that are in this edition (116 in total) are considered to be most of Yun's works.

In a 1986 survey, he was selected as 'the most popular poet amongst the youth' and his popularity continues to this day.

"SKY, WIND, AND STARS", the first English translation of Yun's complete poetic works was published by the Asian Humanities Press of Fremont, CA, in the U.S.A. The translators: Kyung-Nyun Kim Richards(김경년), Steffen F. Richards. The translation and the publication were supported in part by the Grants from KLTI(한국문학번역원) and the Institute of Korean Literature and Arts(문예진흥재단)

In 2020, Korean-American Byun Man-sik translated Yoon Dong-ju's representative poems as Yoon Dong-ju: Selected Poems into English.

== In popular culture ==
- Park Bo-gum’s character in the South Korean television series Good Boy (2025) is named after Yun
- In the 2024 K-Drama series What Comes After Love with Korean actress Lee Se-young and Japanese actor Kentaro Sakaguchi, Yun Dong-ju's Poetry volume The Sky, the Wind, the Stars, and the Poem was featured heavily as a source of inspiration for the female main character and a link between the both main characters - but also her link to her father's history with Japan during his studies abroad - throughout the drama. Yun Dong-ju's memorial plate (also referred to as Poetry Stone commemorating the 50th anniversary of his death) in front of Doshisha University chapel, in Kyoto, was also featured in the series as a location.
- The movie DongJu: The Portrait of a Poet was released in February 2016. It depicts the lives of Yun Dong-ju and Song Mong-gyu in the setting of the Japanese colonial era. Yun is portrayed by actor Kang Ha-Neul. Several theaters screened the movie with English subtitles.
- In 2011, Yun Dong-ju Shoots the Moon, a musical based on his life, was performed by the Seoul Performing Arts Company.
- On 31 December episode of Infinite Challenge featured the climax of the history and hip-hop, Kwanghee and Gaeko featuring Oh Hyuk from Hyukoh performed song title "Your Night" inspired from Yun Dong-ju life and poet.
- In Lee Jung-myung's novel The Investigation (the title of the English translation of original Korean novel) is, inter alia, "an imaginative paean to" Yun.
- In 2007, Yun Dongju is recited by "Sam", on South Korean television series "I Am Sam (TV series)", in episode 13.
- The song "Salt, Pepper, Birds, and the Thought Police" by Mili is thought to be loosely based on the life and poetry of Yun Tongju.

== See also ==
- List of Korean-language poets
- Korean diaspora
- Korean literature
