= Lee Jung-myung =

South Korean writer

Korean name
- Hangul: 이정명
- RR: I Jeongmyeong
- MR: I Chŏngmyŏng

Lee Jung-myung (Korean: 이정명) is a South Korean writer. A popular writer of historical fiction, his books have sold millions of copies in his native country. Several of his books have been adapted into successful TV miniseries, e.g. The Deep-Rooted Tree (2006) and The Painter of Wind (2007). Other books include The Gospel of the Murderer, The Boy Who Escaped Paradise and The Investigation. The last-mentioned novel was translated by Chi Young Kim and was nominated for the Independent Foreign Fiction Prize. The book was inspired by the real-life experiences of Korean poet and dissident Yun Dong-ju. His book La guardia, il poeta e l'investigatore has been selected among the final six books for Premio Bancarella in 2017.

== See also ==
- Portrait of a Beauty
