= Lee Ga-hyun =

South Korean actress (born 1988)

- Lee in 2013
- Born: Kwak Ga-hyun; May 18, 1988 (age 38); Gangneung, Gangwon Province, South Korea
- Education: Dongguk University – theater and film
- Occupation: Actress
- Height: 1.682 m (5 ft 6 in)
- Beauty pageant titleholder
- Title: Miss Korea Seoul 2013 (Winner)
- Agency: Duhong Communications
- Years active: 2008–present

- Lee Ga-hyun
- Hangul: 곽가현
- RR: Gwak Gahyeon
- MR: Kwak Kahyŏn

Stage name
- Hangul: 이가현
- RR: I Gahyeon
- MR: I Kahyŏn

Lee Ga-hyun (born Kwak Ga-hyun on May 18, 1988) is a South Korean actress. She has won the Jin title of the Miss Seoul 2013 and she was also a contestant of the Miss Korea 2013.

== Filmography ==
=== Television series ===
Year	Title	Role/Note(s)	Network
2009	The Return of Iljimae	Bong-hee	MBC
2009	What's for Dinner?		MBC
2009	My Fair Lady	Lee Jin-joo	KBS2
2010	All About Marriage	writer Jeong	KBS2
2011	KBS Drama Special: "Princess Hwapyung's Weight Loss"	Jeong-nan	KBS2
2012	The King's Doctor	Queen Myeongseong	MBC
2016	The Royal Gambler	Hwa-jin	SBS

=== Film ===
Year	Title	Role
2008	Dachimawa Lee	Madame Jang's friend (cameo)
2009	My Girlfriend Is an Agent	High school student at haunted house (cameo)
2014	Santa Barbara	Girl at the lot cafe opening (cameo)
