= Santa Barbara (film) =

- Theatrical poster
- Directed by: David Cho
- Written by: David Cho
- Produced by: Jo Eun-un; Baek Jae-ho
- Starring: Lee Sang-yoon; Yoon Jin-seo
- Cinematography: Lee Hee-seob
- Edited by: Lee Sang-min
- Music by: Kang Yoo-hyun
- Production company: Film Company JoseE
- Distributed by: 9ers Entertainment
- Release date: July 17, 2014
- Running time: 99 minutes
- Country: South Korea
- Language: Korean
- Box office: US$117,516

Santa Barbara (Korean: 산타바바라) is a 2014 South Korean romance film starring Lee Sang-yoon and Yoon Jin-seo. It was written and directed by David Cho (also known as Cho Sung-kyu).

== Plot ==
Jung-woo is a naïve music director of film and commercials, and works part-time at a music institute run by his friend. Until one day, his friend flees from his debts and workload, leaving Jung-woo to face the angry creditors, one of whom takes Jung-woo's precious guitar. While having a drink with director Kim, one of the creditors, Jung-woo meets Soo-kyung, whose sister is involved in the director's project. Soo-kyung is a promising creative director at an advertising agency, and Jung-woo's brief encounter with her leaves a good impression on him. When Jung-woo takes a job working on commercial music to buy back his guitar, the two run into each other. As they begin to spend time together at work and after-hours drinks, the more Jung-woo and Soo-kyung learn about each other. Aside from feeling attraction towards each other, they realize that they have several things in common, like coming from an atypical family and dreams of going on a winery tour. However, their relationship is put to the test when Jung-woo doesn't show up on the day of Soo-kyung's presentation because he was caught in heavy traffic. Soo-kyung misunderstands, calling him irresponsible, and the two break up. But not long after, they get a chance to work together on a project in Santa Barbara, California, which happens to be the location of their dream winery tour.

== Cast ==
- Lee Sang-yoon as Jung-woo
- Yoon Jin-seo as Soo-kyung
- Esom as So-young
- Seo Beom-seok as Director Kim
- Shin Dong-mi as Ho-kyung
- Kim Jung-eun as Director Son
- Baek Won-gil as Team leader Kim
- Kim Yong-jin as Director Jung
- Lee Kyu-hoi as Yong-rak
- Baik Hyun-jhin as Director Baek
- Cha Soo-min as Soo-jin
- Darcy Paquet as United States agent
- Baek Jae-ho as Soo-kyung's male senior colleague
- Kim Sang-seok as Assistant director
- Jang Seok-won as PD
- Jeong Mi-ra as Mom's voice
- Choi Yoon-so as Actress filming
- Ubare as Lot cafe keyboardist
- Lee Ga-hyun as Girl at the lot cafe opening
- Kim Tae-woo as Representative Jo (cameo)
- Park Hae-il as Reporter's voice (cameo)
- Kim Hye-na as Actress at the premiere (cameo)
