= Lee Joon-ha =

South Korean actress (born 2001)

- Born: April 15, 2001 (age 25); Seoul, South Korea
- Occupation: Actress

Korean name
- Hangul: 이준하
- RR: I Junha
- MR: I Chunha

Lee Joon-ha (Korean: 이준하; born April 15, 2001) is a South Korean actress. She began her career as a child actress, notably as the protagonist's daughter in the thriller Midnight FM (2010).

== Filmography ==
=== Film ===
Year	Title	Role
2007	Small Town Rivals	Yeo-jin
2008	The Little Prince	Saet-byul
2008	Truck	Jung Da-young
2009	Running Turtle	Second daughter
2010	Harmony	Children's choir
2010	Midnight FM	Ko Eun-soo
2010	Finding Mr. Destiny	Woo-ri
2011	The Suicide Forecast	Mi-hee

=== Television series ===
Year	Title	Role
2006	Love Truly	Jang Joon-won's daughter
2007	By My Side	Saet-byul
2007	New Wise Mother, Good Wife	Child
2007	Coffee Prince	Child at taekwondo class
2007	Auction House	Yoo-ri
2008	Before and After: Plastic Surgery Clinic	young Yoon Seo-jin
2008	Saranghae (I Love You)	Mi-joo
2008	Our Happy Ending	young Kang Mi-na
2008	My Life's Golden Age	Yoo Hyo-eun
2010	Smile Again	Lee Song-yi
