= Secret Love (2010 film) =

South Korean erotic thriller film

- Film poster
- Hangul: 비밀애
- Hanja: 秘密爱
- RR: Bimirae
- MR: Pimirae
- Directed by: Ryu Hoon
- Written by: Ryu Hoon; Kwon Ji-yeon
- Produced by: Choi Jae-ho
- Starring: Yoo Ji-tae; Yoon Jin-seo
- Cinematography: Kim Hyung-koo
- Edited by: Kim Kyung-jin
- Music by: Lee Jae-jin
- Production company: Hancomm
- Distributed by: Cinergy
- Release date: March 25, 2010
- Running time: 111 minutes
- Country: South Korea
- Language: Korean
- Box office: US$1,058,979

Secret Love (Korean: 비밀애; RR: Bimirae), also known as The Secret River, is a 2010 South Korean erotic thriller film starring Yoo Ji-tae and Yoon Jin-seo.

== Plot ==
Only two months after their storybook marriage, beautiful young Yeon-yi (Yoon Jin-seo) is suffering through the repercussions of a car crash that's put her handsome new husband Jin-woo (Yoo Ji-tae) into a deep coma. She finds herself waiting at the airport for her husband's brother Jin-ho, but, never having previously met, Yeon-yi is shocked to discover that he and Jin-woo are identical twins. Initially cold toward each other, the two soon fall in love. The situation grows more complicated when Jin-woo suddenly awakens from his coma.

== Cast ==
- Yoo Ji-tae as Jin-woo / Jin-ho
- Yoon Jin-seo as Yeon-yi
- Im Ye-jin as Yeon-yi's mother
- Oh Yeon-ah as strange woman
- Jung In-gi as Priest Choi
- Ko Yu-seon as Nurse Kim
- Lee Mi-do as Nurse Park
- Lee -rin as Nurse Lee
- Seo Jin as Ate Amy Cute
- Yang Eun-yong as editor-in-chief
- Im Ho as hair stylist
- Ji Dae-han as hiker
- Sung Ji-ru as inn owner
- Lee Jun-hyeok as unfamiliar man

== Production ==
Stars Yoo Ji-tae and Yoon Jin-seo previously worked together in Oldboy.
