= Girl Scout (film) =

- Directed by: Kim Sang-man
- Written by: Kim Seok-joo
- Produced by: Sim Bo-gyeong
- Starring: Kim Sun-a; Na Moon-hee; Lee Kyung-sil; Go Joon-hee
- Cinematography: Seong Seung-taek
- Edited by: Kim Sang-bum; Kim Jae-bum
- Music by: Kim Sang-man
- Production companies: MK Pictures; Myung Films; BK Pictures; Pancinema; KD Media
- Distributed by: Lotte Entertainment
- Release date: June 5, 2008
- Running time: 100 minutes
- Country: South Korea
- Language: Korean
- Box office: US$1.5 million

Girl Scout (Korean: 걸스카우트) is a 2008 South Korean action comedy film directed by Kim Sang-man.

== Plot ==
Set in Bongcheon-3 dong, a deprived area in Seoul, four women are struggling financially. They are I-man (Na Moon-hee), a woman in her 60s working at a supermarket to look after her unemployed son; Bong-soon (Lee Kyung-sil), a widow who lives with an ill child; Mi-kyung (Kim Sun-a), a divorcee; and Eun-ji (Go Joon-hee), a caddie. They are determined to raise the money to open up a store in their neighborhood, and it is their sole hope and dream. But things get much worse when Hye-ran (Im Ji-eun), the head of their credit union, runs off with their life savings. Desperate, they create a team called Bong Chon Girl Scouts Troop #3 to recover the stolen money, and chaos ensues.

== Cast ==
- Kim Sun-a as Choi Mi-kyung
- Na Moon-hee as Lee I-man
- Lee Kyung-sil as Oh Bong-soon
- Go Joon-hee as Kang Eun-ji
- Park Won-sang as Min Hong-gi
- Im Ji-eun as Seong Hye-ran
- Ryu Tae-joon as Lee Jong-dae
- Choi Jung-woo .as Director Han
- Park Hyuk-kwon as Beom-seok
- Kim Hyang-gi as Yoon-i, Mi-kyeong's daughter
- Yeojin Jeon as waitress
- Yang Gi-won as Lee I-man's son
- Jeong Mi-seong as supermarket manager
- Yeo Min-goo as Han-seo Capital employee
- Jeong Se-hyeong as security employee

== Release ==
Girl Scout was released in South Korea on June 5, 2008, after the postponement of its planned earlier release in April. On its opening weekend it was ranked fifth at the box office, grossing US$855,238 and receiving 163,122 admissions. It eventually grossed US$1,523,142, with total admissions at 249,114.
