= A Good Day to Have an Affair =

- Poster
- Hangul: 바람피기 좋은날
- RR: Barampigi joeunnal
- MR: Paramp'igi choŭnnal
- Directed by: Jang Mun-il
- Written by: Jang Mun-il
- Produced by: Chun Seung-chul; Lee Min-su
- Starring: Kim Hye-soo; Yoon Jin-seo; Jung Eun-pyo; Lee Jong-hyuk; Lee Min-ki
- Cinematography: Kim Young-ho
- Music by: Bang Jun-seok
- Production companies: Cinema Service iFilm
- Release date: February 8, 2007
- Running time: 103 minutes
- Country: South Korea
- Language: Korean
- Budget: $4 million
- Box office: $11.2 million

A Good Day to Have an Affair (Korean: 바람피기 좋은날; RR: Barampigi joeunnal) is a 2007 South Korean romantic comedy film directed by Jang Mun-il, starring Kim Hye-soo, Yoon Jin-seo, Jung Eun-pyo, Lee Jong-hyuk and Lee Min-ki . The story deals with two lonely housewives who get involved in extramarital affairs.

== Title ==
바람피다 is a Korean idiom that means "to cheat". 바람 = wind, 피다 = to smoke. When you cheat on your spouse, you go back home so fast that even the wind burns (a rough translation).

== Plot ==
Two bored housewives have affairs with two different men that they meet in online chatrooms. As their online relationships develop offline, they often pass each other unwittingly in the hallways of the motels where they meet their lovers.

One day, the lady known as "Dew" is in a motel room with her college-aged lover. Suddenly, her husband bursts through the door, along with police officers that he has brought along. The other lady, known as "Small Bird", is in an adjacent room listening to what's going on in Dew's room. Small Bird whispers to her lover to be quiet, because the police officer in the other room is her husband.

== Cast ==
- Kim Hye-soo as Dew
- Yoon Jin-seo as Small Bird
- Jung Eun-pyo
- Lee Jong-hyuk as Fox
- Kim Do-yeon as Older woman
- Lee Min-ki as Student
- Kim Young-woong as Neighborhood police officer

A Good Day to Have an Affair was the feature film debut of Lee Min-ki. The actor that played Dew's husband, Park Sang-myun, is the same man who played the aloof husband in My Wife is a Gangster (2001).
