= 12 Signs of Love =

South Korean television series

- Promotional poster
- Hangul: 일년에 열두 남자
- RR: Illyeone yeoldu namja
- MR: Illyŏne yŏldu namja
- Genre: Romantic comedy
- Based on: Zwölf Männer hat das Jahr by Martina Paura
- Written by: Hwang Jo-yoon
- Directed by: Oh Jong-rok
- Starring: Yoon Jin-seo; On Joo-wan
- Country of origin: South Korea
- Original language: Korean
- No. of episodes: 16

Production
- Production companies: LDV Media; HMG Entertainment

Original release
- Network: tvN
- Release: February 15 – April 5, 2012

12 Signs of Love (Korean: 일년에 열두남자; Hanja: 一年에 열두男子; RR: Illyeone Yeoldunamja; lit. 'Twelve Men in a Year') is a 2012 South Korean television series starring Yoon Jin-seo and On Joo-wan. It aired on tvN from February 15 to April 5, 2012, on Wednesdays and Thursdays at 23:00 (KST) for 16 episodes.

The romantic comedy series is based on the 2005 German novel Zwölf Männer hat das Jahr by Martina Paura.

== Synopsis ==
Mira, who has recently begun working as a journalist for a magazine, writes a dating advice column drawn from her own experiences. In her column, she presents different types of men with varied relationship styles, while her narratives reflect a perspective rooted in women’s psychology. She also believes that astrology plays a key role in shaping destiny.

Despite having limited personal experience with romance, Mira reluctantly engages in various relationships in order to gather material for her writing.

== Cast ==
- Yoon Jin-seo as Na Mi-roo
- On Joo-wan as Cha Jin-oh
- Go Joon-hee as Park Tan-ya
- Kim Da-hyun as Jo Hyun-woo
- Kim Jin-woo as Won Bin
- Julien Kang as Alex
- Park Sang-myun as Dong-gun
- Kwang Soo as Shi-hoo
- Lee Yong-woo as Lee Joon
- Kim Jung-min as Director Goo
- Choi Hyun-woo as magician
- Sung Je as Kwan-woo
- Park Ji-woo as Kang-soo
- Park Ji-il as Chan-sung
- Choi Su-rin as Michelle Jang
- Bae Geu-rin as Oh Hae-ra
- Yang Geum-seok as Oh Yeon-soon
