= Jo An =

South Korean actress (born 1982)

- Born: Jo Kyung-jin; November 14, 1982 (age 43); Cheongju, South Korea
- Other name: Jo Ahn
- Education: Chung-Ang University - Theater
- Occupation: Actress
- Years active: 1999–present
- Agent: KeyEast

Korean name
- Hangul: 조경진
- Hanja: 趙炅珍
- RR: Jo Gyeongjin
- MR: Cho Kyŏngjin

Stage name
- Hangul: 조안
- Hanja: 趙安
- RR: Jo An
- MR: Cho An

Jo Kyung-jin (Korean: 조경진; born November 14, 1982), known professionally as Jo An (조안), is a South Korean actress. She is best known for the films Lifting King Kong (2009) and My Little Hero (2013), as well as the family drama Jolly Widows (2009) and police procedural Special Affairs Team TEN (2011, 2013).

== Filmography ==
=== Film ===
Year	Title	Role
2001	Sorum	Eun-soo
2003	Wishing Stairs	Eom Hye-ju
2004	Spin Kick	Soo-bin
2006	Holiday	Go Hyo-joo
2007	Project Makeover	18-year-old Na Jung-joo
2007	Muoi: The Legend of a Portrait	Yoon-hee
2008	Little Prince	Kim Sun-ok
2008	Out of My Intention (short film)	Ok-gyeong
2008	Antique	Jin-hyeok's 1st girlfriend (cameo)
2009	Lifting King Kong	Park Young-ja
2009	Hello My Love	Kim Ho-jung
2010	A Good Night's Sleep for the Bad	Lee Hye-kyung
2011	A Piano on the Sea	Eun-ji
2013	My Little Hero (aka A Wonderful Moment)	Sung-hee
2013	Blood and Ties	Yeon Bo-ra
2014	Tuning Fork	Hyang-ok
2014	Old Bicycle	Mi-Ja

=== Television series ===
Year	Title	Role	Network
1999	Goodbye My Love		MBC
2000	Drama City "First Love"		KBS2
2000	New Nonstop		MBC
2001	Drama City "Women's Prison Stories"		KBS2
2001	Drama City "Run"		KBS2
2002	Drama City "Jeon Sang-seo's Father"		KBS2
2002	Hwatu		SBS
2002	Golden Wagon		MBC
2002	Hi! Don't		MBC Dramanet
2003	Bodyguard		KBS2
2003	First Love	Oh Hee-soo	SBS
2004	MBC Best Theater "Happy Ending for All"	Kim Eun-chae	MBC
2004	The Land	Gwi-nyeo	SBS
2005	Take My Hand	Jung Eun-mi	KBS2
2005	Drama City "Summer, A Tale of Goodbye"	Yoon-joo	KBS2
2005	MBC Best Theater "She's Looking"	Ji-young	MBC
2005	Chosun Police	Seo-eun	MBC Dramanet
2006	Seoul 1945	Kim Ma-ri/Kim Yeon-kyung	KBS1
2009	Jolly Widows	Kang Na-yoon	KBS1
2010	Three Sisters	Kim Eun-joo	SBS
2010	Joseon X-Files	Boo-ok (guest, episode 5)	tvN
2011	Gwanggaeto, The Great Conqueror	Damju	KBS1
2011	Special Affairs Team TEN	Nam Ye-ri	OCN
2012	Drama Special "Mellow in May"	Han Oh-wol	KBS2
2013	Special Affairs Team TEN Season 2	Nam Ye-ri	OCN
2013–2014	Shining Romance	Jang Chae-ri	MBC
2015–2016	The Dearest Lady	Han Ah-jung	MBC
2019	Blessing of the Sea	Yeo Ji-na	MBC

=== Variety show ===
Year	Title	Network	Notes/Ref.
2012	Law of the Jungle W - Season 3	SBS	cast member

=== Radio program ===
Year	Title	Station	Notes
2013	Fairy Tales for Adults	EBS FM	DJ

== Discography ==
=== Soundtrack appearances ===
Year	Song title	Album
2009	"La Mer (Ending Title)"	Hello My Love OST

== Bibliography ==
Year	Title	Publisher	ISBN
2010	단 한 마디	Sejong Media	ISBN 9788994485034

== Awards and nominations ==
Year	Award	Category	Nominated work	Result
2004	SBS Drama Awards	New Star Award	The Land	Won
2009	17th Chunsa Film Art Awards	Best New Actress	Lifting King Kong	Won
2009	KBS Drama Awards	Excellence Award, Actress in a Daily Drama	Jolly Widows	Won
2010	46th Baeksang Arts Awards	Best New Actress	Lifting King Kong	Won
2010	SBS Drama Awards	Best Supporting Actress in a Weekend/Daily Drama	Three Sisters	Nominated
2014	MBC Drama Awards	Excellence Award, Actress in a Serial Drama	Shining Romance	Nominated
2019	MBC Drama Awards	Excellence Award, Actress in a Weekend/Daily Drama	Blessing of the Sea	Nominated
