= Portrait of a Beauty =

- Theatrical release poster
- Hangul: 미인도
- Hanja: 美人圖
- RR: Miindo
- MR: Miindo
- Directed by: Jeon Yun-su
- Written by: Han Su-ryeon
- Based on: Painter of the Wind by Lee Jung-myung
- Produced by: Choi Jun-yeong; Kim Se-hun; Lee Seong-hun
- Starring: Kim Min-sun; Kim Young-ho; Kim Nam-gil; Choo Ja-hyun
- Cinematography: Park Hee-ju
- Edited by: Park Gok-ji
- Music by: Hwang Sang-jun
- Production companies: Iroom Pictures; Sponge Entertainment
- Distributed by: CJ Entertainment
- Release date: November 13, 2008
- Running time: 108 minutes
- Country: South Korea
- Language: Korean
- Box office: US$11.8 million

Portrait of a Beauty (Korean: 미인도; RR: Miindo) is a 2008 South Korean historical romantic drama film directed by Jeon Yun-su. Adapted from the bestselling novel Painter of the Wind (바람의 화원; Baramui hwawon) by Lee Jung-myung, the film portrays Joseon-era painter Sin Yun-bok (better known by his art name, Hyewon) as being a woman disguised as a man.

Portrait of a Beauty opened in South Korean theaters on 13 November 2008. It was the 8th most attended domestic film of 2008 with 2,364,482 tickets sold.

== Plot ==
Retired court painter Sin Han-pyeong seeks to settle an old score with the most sought-after painter of that time, Kim Hong-do. Sin raises his son to surpass Kim Hong-do, but his son commits suicide over his lack of talent. The father then pushes his daughter Yun-jeong to disguise herself as her brother and enter the world of court painters.

The grown-up Yun-jeong, now known under the pen name "Hyewon," finally enters the court and learns to paint under the guidance of Kim Hong-do, who is trusted by King Jeongjo.

Kim Hong-do quickly notices Yun-bok's huge potential as well as his girlish features. Things remain normal until Yun-bok goes out and comes across a playful seller of mirrors, Kang-mu. When their romantic adventure takes off, it is Kim Hong-do who ends up heartbroken. Kim's jealousy and his desire to own Yun-bok physically and emotionally soar to a perilous level.

== Cast ==
- Kim Gyu-ri as Sin Yun-bok
- Kim Young-ho as Kim Hong-do
- Kim Nam-gil as Kang-mu
- Choo Ja-hyun as Seol-hwa
- Han Myeong-goo as King Jeongjo
- Park Ji-il as Sin Han-pyeong
- Kwon Byeong-gil as Kim Geo-sang
- Choi Kyoo-hwan as Artist Choi
- Yeo Ho-min as Artist Shim
- Kim Seung-hoon as Artist Hong
- Kang San as young Yun-bok

== Artistic license ==
Sin Yun-bok, better known by the art name Hyewon, was a real historical figure who produced a host of thematically provocative and artistically excellent paintings in the 18th century. However, not one record of the painter still exists.

Several art history scholars have criticized the Korean entertainment industry for distorting historical facts about the painter, who was unquestionably a man. The novel had also been adapted into the television series Painter of the Wind.

== Awards and nominations ==
2009 Baeksang Arts Awards

- Nomination – Best Actress – Kim Gyu-ri

2009 Chunsa Film Art Awards

- Best Cinematography – Park Hee-ju
- Best Editing – Park Gok-ji
- Best Art Direction – Lee Ha-jun

2009 Grand Bell Awards

- Best Cinematography – Park Hee-ju
- Nomination – Best Director – Jeon Yun-su
- Nomination – Best Actress – Kim Gyu-ri
- Nomination – Best Supporting Actress – Choo Ja-hyun
- Nomination – Best Lighting – Kim Seung-gyu
- Nomination – Best Art Direction – Lee Ha-jun
- Nomination – Best Costume Design – Lee Yu-suk

2009 Blue Dragon Film Awards

- Nomination – Best Supporting Actress – Choo Ja-hyun
- Nomination – Best Lighting – Kim Seung-gyu
- Nomination – Best Art Direction – Lee Ha-jun
