= Yoo Ji-tae =

South Korean actor (born 1976)

- Yoo in 2026
- Born: April 13, 1976 (age 50); Seoul, South Korea
- Education: Dankook University (BA); Chung-Ang University (MFA); Catholic University of Korea (MSW)
- Occupations: Actor; director
- Years active: 1998–present
- Agent: MSTeam Entertainment
- Spouse: Kim Hyo-jin (m. 2011)
- Children: 2

Korean name
- Hangul: 유지태
- RR: Yu Jitae
- MR: Yu Chit'ae
- Website: yoomovie.co.kr

Yoo Ji-tae (Korean: 유지태; born April 13, 1976) is a South Korean actor. After a stint as a fashion model, Yoo launched his acting career in 1998 then rose to fame through the films Attack the Gas Station (1999) and Ditto (2000). In the succeeding years, he gained acting recognition by working with acclaimed directors such as Hur Jin-ho in One Fine Spring Day (2001), Park Chan-wook in Oldboy (2003), and Hong Sang-soo in Woman is the Future of Man (2004). Yoo began directing short films in 2003, which were well received in the film festival circuit. His feature directorial debut Mai Ratima was released in 2012.

== Early life and education ==
Yoo Ji-tae was born on April 13, 1976 in Seoul, South Korea. Yoo was raised by a single parent. Of his mother, he said, "My mother, who worked as a nurse for a long time, wants to run a hospital for the elderly someday. I want to financially help her realize her dream, and then establish an orphanage".

Yoo is friends with comedian Kim Joon-ho, having lived together as roommates during university and briefly acting together on-stage. He graduated with a Bachelor's degree from the Department of Theatre and Film at Dankook University's College of Liberal Arts. He then earned a Master's degree in visual arts from Chung-Ang University and a Master's degree in social welfare from Catholic University of Korea. He is currently pursuing a doctorate in visual arts at Chung-Ang University.

Yoo was teaching in the Department of Film and Video at Konkuk University for some time before being appointed as a full-time professor on September 1, 2023. He has been working as a full-time professor since the second semester of 2023.

== Career ==
Yoo began his career as a fashion model, and he walked the runway for the Seoul Fashion Artist Association collections in 1995. Then in 2000, with a series of hit films and widely seen TV appearances, Yoo was more constantly in the limelight than any other actor, and in a very short time, rose to become a major actor in Korean film.

His first brush with fame came in the role of "Paint" in his second feature, the 1999 hit Attack the Gas Station. His sensitive and artistic image in this film and the warm character he displayed as a guest on TV talk shows helped to propel him to stardom. With the surprise success of his third film Ditto in spring 2000, Yoo's star status was secured. He also appeared in the successful firefighting film Libera Me. In this early part of his career, he was known particularly for the wild colors that he would dye his hair (white in Attack the Gas Station, blue in Ditto, blonde in Libera Me).

In 2001, however, he dyed his hair black and took on a more subdued, serious role in Hur Jin-ho's One Fine Spring Day. Although it wasn't a big hit with audiences, his performance in this film opened many critics' eyes and drew widespread praise, while officially launching the second stage of his career.

For the next two years, Yoo didn't appear in any new films, because Natural City took an unusually long time to progress from shooting to a commercial release. He then appeared in three works in 2003: Natural City (which bombed, despite its big budget and special effects), the horror/suspense film Into the Mirror, and Park Chan-wook's acclaimed Oldboy. Yoo's memorable role in the latter film as a wealthy eccentric fixated on revenge would make his face well known to international audiences.

Yoo has stated that he believes Oldboy to be an original Korean story.

As Yoo's career established itself he began to appear in many high-profile projects, such as in well-known arthouse director Hong Sang-soo's Woman is the Future of Man (which, like Oldboy, screened at Cannes in 2004); Yim Pil-sung's big-budget Antarctic Journal, shot in New Zealand; and the action/noir Running Wild with Kwon Sang-woo. He also established his own production company Yoo Movie in 2005.

As soon as he finished shooting the 2007 period film Hwang Jin-yi about a Joseon-era gisaeng, Yoo chose to act in the play Come to the Ghost House. A graduate of Dankook University with a major in Theater and Film, he also established a theater to put on one play a year. Almost all the money for the theatrical productions comes from his own wallet. "I work on stage because it's there that I find the challenge and the stimulus an actor needs through continuous creative work," he said.

Yoo returned to the screen with 2008 romantic drama film, Hello, Schoolgirl, based on the manhwa Soonjeong Manhwa.

In 2009, he lent his voice as narrator for the track "I’m Sorry" (미안해) in singer Jinju's album Pearlfect.

Yoo then returned to the melodrama genre, starring in his first TV drama Star's Lover opposite Choi Ji-woo, as well as a couple of romance-themed films, notably Secret Love which reunited him with Oldboy costar Yoon Jin-seo. Afterwards he played another villain in the real-time suspense thriller Midnight FM.

After getting his master's degree in 2008 from Chung-Ang University's Graduate School of Advanced Imaging Science, Multimedia & Film, in recent years Yoo has focused more on his passion for directing. To him, "Making films is like taking drugs. Actors feel a pleasure when they deliver well but directors feel they have poured out everything they have in the sole fact that they have completed a movie. It's impossible to compare the pleasure you get from it." He has helmed a number of award-winning short films that have screened in festivals around the world. In addition to directing his fourth short film Invitation, Yoo wrote the script and plays the main character alongside leading lady Uhm Ji-won.

In 2012, Yoo directed his first feature film Mai Ratima, based on a synopsis he wrote 15 years ago in college. It portrays the unlikely love affair of a Korean man in his 30s living on the bottom rung of society and a mail-order bride from Thailand in her 20s. Shooting began in Gyeonggi Province on January 26, 2012, and it premiered at the Busan International Film Festival on October 5, 2012. Yoo said he plans to continue producing or directing movies based on strong social issues as he is interested in the plight of the less privileged. Mai Ratima won the Jury Prize at the 2013 Deauville Asian Film Festival.

He then co-starred with Kōichi Satō and Vincent Gallo in Junji Sakamoto's 2013 suspense thriller Human Trust.

For the biopic The Tenor - Lirico Spinto, Yoo practiced singing for four hours every day for more than a year, and took private English and Japanese lessons to portray Bae Jae-chul, an internationally acclaimed tenor who loses his voice to thyroid cancer. Afterwards, he starred in another TV series Healer, written by Song Ji-na.

In 2016, Yoo starred in the bowling-themed film, Split. He returned to television in the South Korean remake of The Good Wife.

In 2017, Yoo starred in The Swindlers along with Hyun Bin. The movie is about a prosecutor who plans to catch a con man who has swindled a large sum of money. The same year, he was cast in the Danish film The House That Jack Built by Lars Von Trier. He also had a starring role in the crime drama, Mad Dog.

In January 2018, Yoo signed with new management agency BH Entertainment.

In 2019, Yoo is set to star in the espionage melodrama Different Dreams.

In 2020, Yoo starred in the melodrama When My Love Blooms.

On March 7, 2025, MSTeam Entertainment announced that they had signed an exclusive contract with Yoo following the expiration of his contract with BH Entertainment.

== Personal life ==
=== Marriage and family ===
Yoo first met actress Kim Hyo-jin in 2003 when they were models for a clothing brand, and the two became friends after continuously meeting in photo shoots. Their romantic relationship began in 2006, and they were among the very few Korean star couples who openly admitted their dating status. They announced their engagement in August 2011, and subsequently released pre-wedding photos. Their minimalist invitation was made from environmentally friendly paper and had the number 1,825 written on it, the exact number of days the two had spent together as a couple. They were married at the Shilla Hotel in Seoul on December 2, 2011. The wedding date marked the couple's fifth anniversary together and was booked by Yoo one year in advance despite landing on a Friday – an unusual day for a wedding. The ceremony was officiated by the president of World Vision Korea; Yoo and Kim are the organization's honorary ambassadors, and they donated a portion of their monetary wedding gifts to World Vision to help build a primary and middle school in Myanmar. Their first child, a son, was born on July 5, 2014. They welcomed their second son on April 15, 2019.

== Philanthropy ==
Yoo is very active in philanthropic efforts. He joins charity photo shoots and auctions, has helped set up a kindergarten in Nepal, has donated to Haiti earthquake relief, has donated funds for building schools in Myanmar, has joined a charity photo shoot to benefit victims of facial burns, has volunteered in a campaign to deliver free lunches to underprivileged people, has promoted the adoption of abandoned dogs, and has campaigned against domestic violence towards migrant wives. His advocacies are World Vision, Compassion Korea, DAIL Community, Social Welfare Society Inc., YWCA of Korea, Nanum House of Sharing and Korean Association of Cinematheques.

On March 8, 2022, Yoo donated 10 million won to the Hope Bridge Disaster Relief Association to help the victims of the massive wildfire that started in Uljin, Gyeongbuk and has spread to Samcheok, Gangwon.

On May 16, 2022, Yoo donated 10 million won to the 9th Wildflower Film Awards.

== Filmography ==
=== Film ===
==== Acting roles ====
Year	Title	Role	Notes	Ref.
1998	Bye June	Do-gi		
1999	Attack the Gas Station	Paint		
2000	01412 Sect of the Magic Sword	Ma-ko		
2000	Ditto	Ji In		
2000	Nightmare	Hyun-jun		
2000	Libera Me	Kim Hyun-tae		
2001	MOB 2025	K-one	Short film	
2001	One Fine Spring Day	Sang-woo		
2003	Wonderful Days		Voice	
2003	Into the Mirror	Woo Young-min		
2003	Natural City	R		
2003	Oldboy	Lee Woo-jin		
2004	Woman is the Future of Man	Lee Moon-ho		
2005	Antarctic Journal	Kim Min-jae		
2005	Lady Vengeance	Won-mo (adult)	Cameo	
2006	Running Wild	Oh Jin-woo		
2006	Three Fellas	Lee Chi-soo	Cameo	
2006	Traces of Love	Hyun-woo		
2007	Hwang Jin-yi	No-mi		
2008	Hello, Schoolgirl	Kim Yeon-woo		
2009	Invitation		Short film	
2010	Secret Love	Jin-woo / Jin-ho		
2010	Midnight FM	Han Dong-su		
2010	Star of Hope: Ikhwezi Le Themba		Documentary	
2013	Human Trust	Osamu Endo		
2014	The Tenor – Lirico Spinto	Bae Jae-chul		
2016	Split	Chul-jong		
2016	The Great Actor	Himself	Cameo	
2016	Old Days	Himself	Documentary	
2017	The Swindlers	Park Hee-soo		
2018	The House That Jack Built	Man 2	Cameo	
2019	Svaha: The Sixth Finger	Kim Dong-soo	Cameo	
2019	Money	Beon Ho-pyo		
2025	Seven O'Clock Breakfast Club for the Brokenhearted	Jeong-su		
2026	The King's Warden	Han Myŏnghoe		
2027	K-Pop: The Debut	TBA		

==== Filmmaking credits ====
Year	Title	Director	Writer	Producer	Notes	Ref.
2003	The Bike Boy	Yes	Yes	No	Short film	
2005	How Does the Blind Dream?	Yes	Yes	No	Short film	
2008	Out of My Intention	Yes	Yes	Yes	Short film	
2009	Invitation	Yes	Yes	No	Short film	
2013	Mai Ratima	Yes	Yes	No		
2017	The Man Only I Can See	Yes	No	No		

=== Television ===
Year	Title	Role	Notes	Ref.
1999	Love Story	Kang Yoon-seok	Segment "Lost Baggage"; Episode 5–6	
2008–2009	Star's Lover	Kim Chul-soo		
2014–2015	Healer	Kim Moon-ho		
2016	The Good Wife	Lee Tae-joon		
2017	Mad Dog	Choi Kang-woo		
2017	Jugglers	Choi Kang-woo	Episode 9	
2019	Different Dreams	Kim Won-bong		
2020	When My Love Blooms	Han Jae-hyun		
2022	Money Heist: Korea – Joint Economic Area	Professor / Park Seon-ho		
2023	Vigilante	Jo Heon		
2025	Villains	Codename J		
2026	Forest of Silence	Narrator	Documentary	

=== Music video appearances ===
Year	Title	Artist	Ref.
2024	"Good So Bad"	Zerobaseone	

== Bibliography ==
Year	Title	Notes	Ref.
2023	Ankkai	Webtoon; Writer, producer	

== Theater ==
- Ha-il (2004)
- Six Out of Six (2005)
- Come to the Ghost House... (2007)

== Other activities ==
- 2006 28th Clermont-Ferrand International Short Film Festival – Jury
- 2007 9th Short Shorts Film Festival & Asia – Jury
- 2008 4th Jecheon International Music & Film Festival – Jury
- 2009 14th Busan International Film Festival – Jury
- 2009 22nd Tokyo International Film Festival – Jury
- 2011 3rd DMZ International Documentary Film Festival – Co-festival director
- 2024 29th Busan International Film Festival – Jury, The Choon-yun Award

== Accolades ==
=== Awards and nominations ===
Name of the award ceremony, year presented, category, nominee of the award, and the result of the nomination
Award ceremony	Year	Category	Nominee / Work	Result	Ref.
Asia Model Awards	2011	Asia Special Award	Yoo Ji-tae	Won	
Baeksang Arts Awards	2026	Best Supporting Actor – Film	The King's Warden	Nominated	
Blue Dragon Film Awards	1999	Best New Actor	Attack the Gas Station	Nominated	
Blue Dragon Film Awards	2000	Popular Star Award	Ditto	Won	
Blue Dragon Film Awards	2000	Best Actor	Ditto	Nominated	
Blue Dragon Film Awards	2001	Best Actor	One Fine Spring Day	Nominated	
Busan Asian Short Film Festival	2003	Audience Award	The Bike Boy	Won	
Busan Asian Short Film Festival	2006	Fuji Film Award	How Does the Blind Dream?	Won	
Buil Film Awards	2026	Best Supporting Actor	The King's Warden	Nominated	
Busan Film Critics Awards	2000	Best New Actor	Ditto	Won	
Cable TV Broadcasting Awards	2017	Best Actor	The Good Wife	Won	
Chunsa Film Art Awards	2000	Best New Actor	Ditto	Won	
Chunsa Film Art Awards	2014	Best New Director	Mai Ratima	Nominated	
Contemporary Dance Awards	1993	Grand Prize	Yoo Ji-tae	Won	
Deauville Asian Film Festival	2013	Jury Prize	Mai Ratima	Won	
Golden Cinematography Awards	2026	Best Supporting Actor	The King's Warden	Won	
Grand Bell Awards	2001	Best New Actor	Ditto	Nominated	
KBS Drama Awards	2014	Excellence Award, Actor in a Mid-length Drama	Healer	Nominated	
KBS Drama Awards	2017	Excellence Award, Actor in a Miniseries	Mad Dog	Nominated	
KBS Drama Awards	2017	Top Excellence Award, Actor	Mad Dog	Nominated	
Korea Best Dresser Swan Awards	2008	Best Dressed (Movie Actor Category)	Yoo Ji-tae	Won	
Korea Fashion World Awards	2006	Best Dressed (Movie Actor Category)	Yoo Ji-tae	Won	
Korean Film Awards	2006	Best Supporting Actor	Three Fellas	Nominated	
MBC Drama Awards	2019	Top Excellence Award, Actor in a Monday-Tuesday Miniseries	Different Dreams	Nominated	
Model Center New Model Awards	1997	Grand Prize	Yoo Ji-tae	Won	
Photographers' Association	1998	Best Model Award	Yoo Ji-tae	Won	
Short Shorts Film Festival & Asia	2008	Special Contribution Award	Out of My Intention	Won	

=== Honors ===
Name of country or organization, year given, and name of honor or award
Country or organization	Year	Honor / Award	Ref.
Korea Good Donor Award	2021	Minister of Public Administration and Security Award	
Korea Humanitarian Awards	2009	Special Prize	
Ministry of Health and Welfare	2011	Minister's Award	
Seoul Women's Prize	2009	Seoul Women's Prize	

=== Listicles ===
Name of publisher, year listed, name of listicle, and placement
Publisher	Year	Listicle	Placement	Ref.
Korean Film Council	2021	Korean Actors 200 (Note: Introduces 200 actors that best represent the present and future of Korean cinema to the people in the film industry all over the world.)	Included	
