= My Dear Enemy =

- Theatrical release poster
- Hangul: 멋진 하루
- RR: Meotjin haru
- MR: Mŏtchin haru
- Directed by: Lee Yoon-ki
- Written by: Lee Yoon-ki; Park Eun-yeong
- Based on: One Fine Day by Azuko Taira
- Produced by: David Cho; Oh Joong-wan
- Starring: Jeon Do-yeon; Ha Jung-woo
- Cinematography: Choi Sang-ho
- Edited by: Kim Hyeong-ju
- Music by: Kim Jeong-beom
- Production company: Sponge Entertainment
- Distributed by: Lotte Entertainment
- Release date: September 25, 2008
- Running time: 123 minutes
- Country: South Korea
- Language: Korean
- Box office: US$2.1 million

My Dear Enemy (Korean: 멋진 하루; RR: Meotjin haru; lit. 'One Fine Day') is a 2008 South Korean romantic drama film directed by Lee Yoon-ki, starring Jeon Do-yeon and Ha Jung-woo as two ex-lovers who reacquaint themselves while driving around Seoul. The film takes place over one rather uneventful day, and subtle emotions and chemistry between the actors propel the narrative.

== Plot ==
Lee Yoon-ki's deadpan comedy trails a pair of former lovers – he's a charismatic romantic and she's a no-nonsense realist – who bump into each other one year down the road. Hee-soo isn't the type of person to say what's on her mind, but you can tell that something is wrong. When, at a horseracing stadium, she tracks down her ex-boyfriend Byung-woon, her voice is laced with fury. "I want my money," she says, skipping even the barest of greetings. Byung-woon, for his part, looks like a man trapped. Despite his nervous smiles and warm assurances (that seem slightly dodgy), you can guess from the outset that he doesn't have the ₩3.5 million (US$3,500) that he borrowed from her a year earlier. "Don't worry," he tells her, "for sure I can get it for you by the end of the day." Not believing him, but not willing to let him out of her sight until she gets paid, she accompanies him for the day as he visits various old friends and acquaintances (all women) and tries to sweet talk his way into a loan. As both day and debt are whittled down, the pair fall back into old patterns, rehash unsettled gripes, and slowly come to see each other in a new light.

== Cast ==
My Dear Enemy is an exercise in subtle comedy, anchored by the delightful chemistry of the pitch-perfect lead performers. Jeon Do-yeon, as the sensible, even-tempered Hee-soo counterbalances the hysterical mother of a murdered child she played in Secret Sunshine, for which she was named best actress at Cannes in 2007. Ha Jung-woo, too, is winning as the compulsively charming, if unfailingly inept Byung-woon (a role also in stark opposition to his previous outing as the serial killer antagonist in Na Hong-jin's The Chaser).

About working opposite the reputed actress, Ha said Jeon quieted his nervousness with her easy manner. The two had actually appeared together three years before in the 2005 hit drama series Lovers in Prague, where Ha played a supporting role as the heroine's bodyguard. "I can't believe that I have risen to play opposite Jeon in such a short time frame," he said. "While playing her bodyguard in the drama, there were many scenes where I was chauffeuring for her. I remember one particular scene where she was crying, and I was so moved I almost shed tears. Jeon is a great actress who inspires those around her even before the audience." Jeon said that she was the one who was grateful in the partnership. "I didn't know we'd be cast together because of our age difference (Ha is five years her junior), but Jung-woo was able to come far because he was already a good actor back then. Jung-woo is a very versatile actor and really supported me."

== Production ==
Director Lee Yoon-ki had been in a bookstore in Korea, scanning the display of bestsellers, when a lonely little stack of the Japanese novella One Fine Day by Azuko Taira caught his eye, "like one quiet, lonely person drawn to another." He found the story different from the currently popular trendy Japanese fiction, "There's something old-fashioned about it, something very unique and intimate, it felt like an old, forgotten fable," and thought he'd like to make a film that would touch people's hearts the way the book had touched his. The title was a problem, since many films had the same title. Lee thought of the term "enemy" because it can be used in Korean to refer to lovers, friends, even children. In adapting the story for the screen, Lee expanded on the novella, adding to the number of people the ex-lovers encounter, and changed some details (including the ending scene).

The film translates beautifully into the Seoul urban-scape, as the narrative takes one through the city's high rises and small alleys to absorb its mellow autumnal colors. Even though a large proportion of shots are taken beside the steering wheel or through a dashboard, the fluid cinematography still sustains visual interest.

The film took 37 days to shoot at around 58 locations in Seoul, including the back streets of Yongsan, Jongno, Itaewon and a few overpasses and crossroads.

Music director Kim Jeong-beom composed a jazz film score with influences from 1930-40s American music as well as Latin jazz. The music greatly enhances the atmosphere in the film.

Apart from the long take that opens the film, Lee's quietly assured direction avoids stylistic flourishes and puts the actor's performances at the center of the film – though the irregular rhythms of his editing help to augment a sense of tension between the two leads. This tension – fueled by angry resentment on Hee-soo's part and guilt on Byung-woon's – functions more or less as the film's story, in that it slowly transforms over the course of the day.

== International release ==
The film had its U.S. premiere at the San Francisco International Asian American Film Festival on March 12, 2009.

== Awards and nominations ==
Year	Award	Category	Recipients	Result
2008	11th Director's Cut Awards	Best Actor	Ha Jung-woo	Won
2008	7th Korean Film Awards	Best Actor	Ha Jung-woo	Nominated
2009	10th Busan Film Critics Awards	Best Actor	Ha Jung-woo	Won
2009	18th Buil Film Awards	Best Actor	Ha Jung-woo	Won
2009	45th Baeksang Arts Awards	Best Actor	Ha Jung-woo	Nominated
2009	45th Baeksang Arts Awards	Best Director	Lee Yoon-ki	Won
