= Jeon Yun-su =

South Korean filmmaker (born 1971)

Jeon Yun-su (Korean: 전윤수; born March 5, 1971, in Seoul) is a South Korean film director and scriptwriter.

== Filmography ==
As director:

- Summer Snow (2015)
- Portrait of a Beauty (2008)
- Le Grand Chef (2007)
- My Girl and I (2005)
- Kiss Me Much (2001)
