= Beautiful (2008 film) =

- Theatrical poster
- Hangul: 아름답다
- RR: Areumdapda
- MR: Arŭmdapta
- Directed by: Juhn Jai-hong
- Screenplay by: Juhn Jai-hong
- Story by: Kim Ki-duk
- Produced by: Kim Ki-duk; David Cho
- Starring: Cha Soo-yeon; Lee Chun-hee
- Cinematography: Kim Gi-tae
- Edited by: Juhn Jai-hong
- Music by: No Hyeong-u
- Distributed by: Sponge Entertainment
- Release date: 14 February 2008
- Running time: 88 minutes
- Country: South Korea
- Language: Korean
- Box office: US$9,840

Beautiful (Korean: 아름답다) is a 2008 South Korean film, and the debut feature of director Juhn Jai-hong. The film is based on an original story by Kim Ki-duk.

== Plot ==
Eun-Yeong is a young woman who finds her beauty to be a curse, drawing unwanted attention from all kinds of men and making other women jealous. Nevertheless, she leads a relatively content life until she is raped by one of her stalkers, Seong-min, who then blames Eun-Yeong for the incident, saying, "I did it because you're so beautiful". Traumatized by her attack, Eun-Yeong tries to destroy her beauty, first by attempting to become obese, and when that fails by making herself unattractively thin. When her beauty does start to fade, she becomes alarmed and tries to regain it by wearing gaudy makeup and revealing clothes, her behavior increasingly destructive and unstable. A policeman, Eun-Cheol, watches her downfall with pity and sympathy, but eventually, he too submits to his lustful desires.

== Cast ==
- Cha Soo-yeon as Eun-yeong
- Lee Chun-hee as Eun-cheol
- Choi Moo-sung as Detective Kim
- Kim Min-soo as Seong-min
- Lee Min as Mi-yeon
- Bae Yong-geun as Beauty salon boss
- Kim Seon-bin as Working man
- Jo Seok-hyeon as Lavatory man
- Lee Chang-min as Police station man

== Release ==
Beautiful premiered in the Panorama section of the 58th Berlin International Film Festival, and was given a limited theatrical release in South Korea on February 14, 2008, where it was screened in just five Seoul theaters. As of March 31, 2008, it had received a total of 1,478 admissions, and as of April 13, it grossed US$9,840.

== Awards ==
Beautiful won the Grand Prix at the 2008 Fukuoka Asian Film Festival.
