= Dream (2008 film) =

2008 South Korean film directed by Kim Ki-duk

- Theatrical poster
- Hangul: 비몽
- Hanja: 悲夢
- RR: Bimong
- MR: Pimong
- Directed by: Kim Ki-duk
- Written by: Kim Ki-duk
- Produced by: Kim Ki-duk; David Cho
- Starring: Joe Odagiri; Lee Na-young
- Cinematography: Kim Gi-tae
- Edited by: Kim Ki-duk
- Music by: Park Ji-woong
- Distributed by: Showbox
- Release date: October 9, 2008
- Running time: 95 minutes
- Country: South Korea
- Languages: Korean; Japanese
- Box office: $535,872

Dream (Korean: 비몽; RR: Bimong) is a 2008 South Korean film directed by Kim Ki-duk.

It is the fifteenth feature film by the director.

== Plot ==
Jin awakes from a dream where he causes a traffic accident, only to find that the accident actually took place. The police suspect a woman, Ran, though she denies any involvement as she was asleep the whole time. It transpires that while Jin dreams, Ran acts out those dreams in her sleep.

== Cast ==
- Joe Odagiri as Jin
- Lee Na-young as Ran
- Park Ji-a as Jin's former lover
- Kim Tae-hyun as Ran's former lover
- Lee Joo-seok as traffic police officer
- Han Gi-joong as violent crimes police officer
- Lee Ho-yeong as crime scene police officer
- Kim Min-su as crime scene police officer
- Chang Mi-hee as a doctor

== Release ==
Dream was released in South Korea on 9 October 2008, and on its opening weekend was ranked sixth at the box office with 39,042 admissions. As of 16 November, the film had received a total of 88,482 admissions, and grossed a total of $411,549.
