= Breath (2007 film) =

- Hangul: 숨
- RR: Sum
- MR: Sum
- Directed by: Kim Ki-duk
- Written by: Kim Ki-duk
- Starring: Chang Chen; Park Ji-a
- Cinematography: Seong Jong-mu
- Edited by: Wang Su-an
- Music by: Kim Myeong-jong
- Distributed by: Sponge
- Release date: April 26, 2007
- Running time: 84 minutes
- Country: South Korea
- Language: Korean
- Box office: $624,947

Breath (Korean: 숨) is the fourteenth feature film by South Korean director Kim Ki-duk.

== Plot ==
A loner housewife, Yeon, deals with her depression and anger by beginning a passionate affair with a convicted man on death row. After discovering her husband's infidelity, Yeon visits the prison where a notorious condemned criminal, Jin, is confined. She has been following the news reports of his numerous suicide attempts. Despite knowing Jin's crimes, Yeon treats him like an old lover and puts all her efforts into his happiness, even though she doesn't know him.

== Cast ==
- Chang Chen - Jang Jin
- Park Ji-a - Yeon
- Ha Jung-woo - Yeon's husband
- Kang In-hyeong - Young prisoner
- Kim Ki-duk - Prison warden

== Reception ==
Review aggregator Rotten Tomatoes reports 60% approval for Breath, based on ten critics. Breath was nominated for the Palme d'Or award at the 2007 Cannes Film Festival, although the prize was eventually awarded to the film 4 Months, 3 Weeks and 2 Days.

The film grossed a total of $624,947 internationally.
