= Guarantee (filmmaking) =

Contractual term in the film industry guaranteeing pay if the party is released

In filmmaking, a guarantee, or informally a "pay-or-play" contract, is a term in a contract of an actor, director, or other participant that guarantees pay if the participant is released from the contract, with various exceptions.

Studios are reluctant to agree to guarantees but accept them as part of the deal for signing popular actors. They also have the advantage of enabling a studio to remove a participant under such a contract, with few legal complications.

As Dina Appleton writes, "Memoirs of a Geisha is an example of a film on which the provision came into play... several actors were hired by the studio under pay-or-play deals. When the contracted start date came and went, those actors began receiving their full salary as if they were rendering services."
