= Die Lotosblume =

Poem by Heinrich Heine

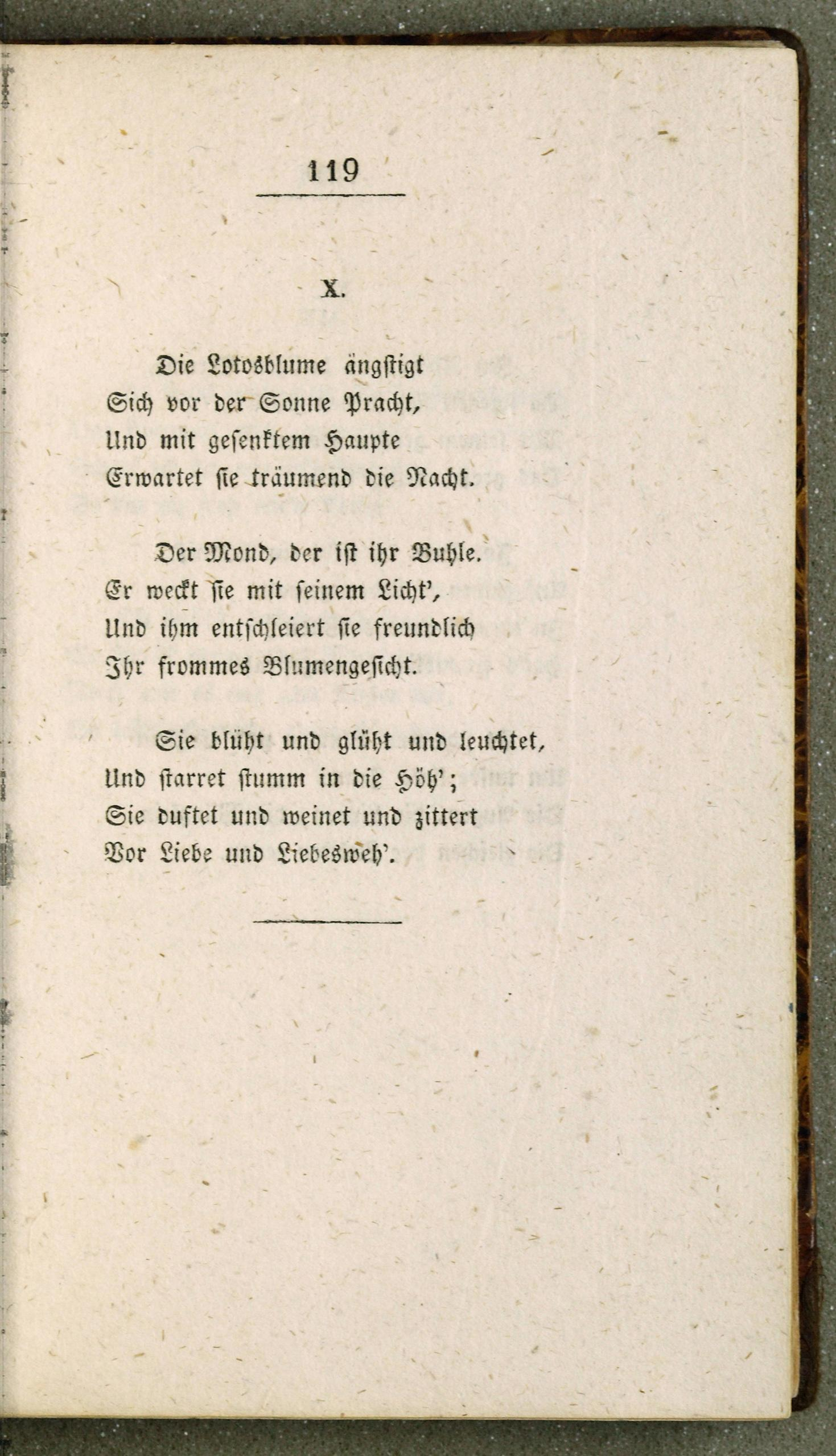
A scan of the poem’s page in Buch der Lieder.

"Die Lotosblume" ('The Lotus Flower') is a poem written by Heinrich Heine, and published in his Buch der Lieder ('The Book of Songs', 1827). Set to music by Robert Schumann in 1840, this Lied is part of Schumann's Myrthen collection and Six Songs for Männerchor. It is written in the key of F Major, and set in 6/4 time. The piece speaks of the blooming of a lotus flower, who hides from the sun and only reveals herself at night to her lover, the moon. Due to circumstances at the time, the lyrics were intended to have a double meaning.

When Schumann was courting his future wife Clara, her father was opposed to the relationship. The lotusblume, the sun, and the moon may represent Clara, her father, and Robert Schumann respectively. When the piece begins, there is a heavy octave bass line that may symbolize the father's authority over the relationship. The beginning text is translated to "The lotusflower fears the sun's splendor." Then, when the text "Der Mond, der ist ihr Buhle" or "the moon is her lover" enters, the musical texture changes to a higher register with chord voicing in clusters. Schuman's love for Clara is tender and passionate, and allows her to blossom into her full potential like the lotusblume flower blooms at night.

== Text ==
Deutsch

Die Lotosblume ängstigt
Sich vor der Sonne Pracht,
Und mit gesenktem Haupte
Erwartet sie träumend die Nacht.

Der Mond, der ist ihr Buhle,
Er weckt sie mit seinem Licht,
Und ihm entschleiert sie freundlich
Ihr frommes Blumengesicht.

Sie blüht und glüht und leuchtet,
Und starret stumm in die Höh;
Sie duftet und weinet und zittert
Vor Liebe und Liebesweh.

English

The Lotus flower is afraid
of the sun's splendour,
and with drooping head
she dreamily awaits the night.

The moon, he is her lover.
He wakes her with his light
and to him she happily unveils
her devoted flower-face.

She blooms and glows and shines
and stares mute into the heavens.
She exhales and weeps and trembles
with love and love's pain.
