= Cha Soo-yeon =

South Korean actress (born 1981)

- Born: August 15, 1981 (age 45); Gangwon Province, South Korea
- Occupation: Actress
- Years active: 2004–present
- Agent: Red Line Entertainment
- Spouse: Na Byung-joon (m. 2012)

Korean name
- Hangul: 차수연
- RR: Cha Suyeon
- MR: Ch'a Suyŏn

Cha Soo-yeon (Korean: 차수연; born August 15, 1981) is a South Korean actress. She is best known for her leading role in the 2008 film Beautiful.

== Filmography ==
=== Film ===
- On the Way (2014)
- The Scent (2012)
- Helpless (2012)
- Love Call (2011)
- Cafe Noir (2010)
- After the Banquet (2009, telecinema)
- The Executioner (2009)
- Yoga (2009)
- Five Senses of Eros "I'm Right Here" (2009)
- Boat (2009)
- Nowhere to Turn (2008)
- Beautiful (2008)
- For Eternal Hearts (2007)

=== Television series ===
- Wonderful World (MBC, 2024)
- Love Scene Number (MBC TV, 2021)
- Private Lives (JTBC, 2020)
- Good Casting (SBS, 2020)
- Twelve Nights (Channel A, 2018)
- Fates & Furies (SBS, 2018)
- Ms. Hammurabi (JTBC, 2018)
- My Heart Twinkle Twinkle (SBS, 2015)
- Liar Game (tvN, 2014)
- My Lover, Madame Butterfly (SBS, 2012)
- Drama Special – "Re-Memory" (KBS2, 2012)
- A Thousand Kisses (MBC, 2011)
- Drama Special – "Hair Show" (KBS2, 2011)
- Stormy Lovers (MBC, 2010)
- Hot Blood (KBS2, 2009)
- Worlds Within (KBS2, 2008)
- Time Between Dog and Wolf (MBC, 2007)
- Coma (OCN, 2005)
- You Will Know (KBS2, 2004)

=== Music video appearances ===
- BigBang - "Lies" (2007)
- Kim Tae-woo - "Things to Say" (2006)
- Park Hyo-shin - "Scattered Days" (2005)
- Ha Rim - "Somewhere Away" (2004)
