= Yoon Jin-seo =

South Korean actress (born 1983)

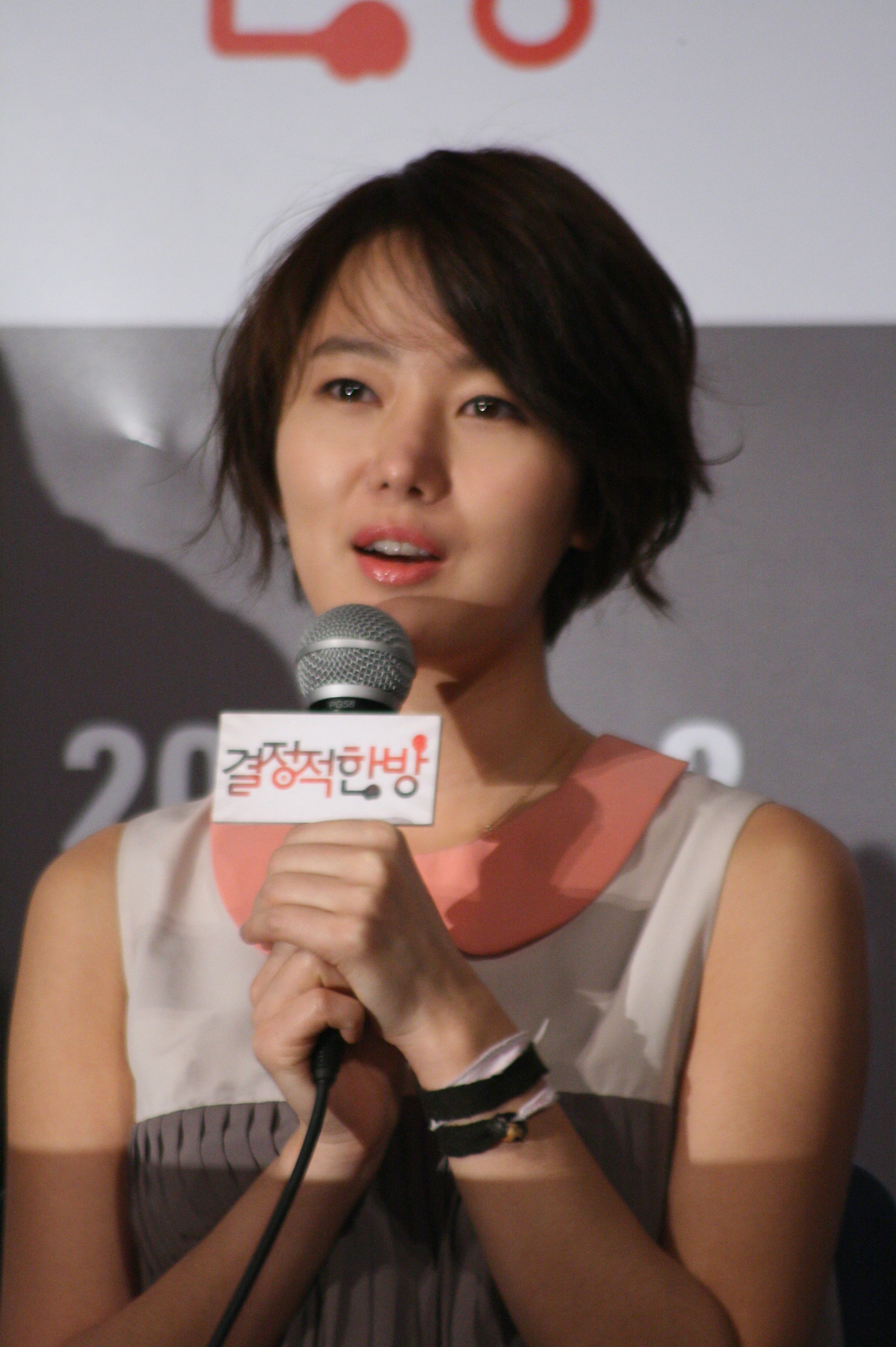
- Yoon in December 2011
- Born: Yoon Soo-kyung; August 5, 1983 (age 43); Guro District, Seoul, South Korea
- Education: Seoul Institute of the Arts – Theater
- Occupation: Actress
- Years active: 2001–present
- Agents: FNC; Big Picture
- Spouse: Unknown (m. 2017)
- Children: 1

Korean name
- Hangul: 윤수경
- Hanja: 尹水京
- RR: Yun Sugyeong
- MR: Yun Sugyŏng

Stage name
- Hangul: 윤진서
- Hanja: 尹珍序
- RR: Yun Jinseo
- MR: Yun Chinsŏ

Yoon Jin-seo (Korean: 윤진서; born August 5, 1983), birth name Yoon Soo-kyung, is a South Korean actress. She rose to prominence for her performance as Lee Soo-ah in the 2003 thriller film Oldboy which earned her the Best New Actress Award at the 40th Baeksang Arts Awards. Yoon is also best known for her performances in Beastie Boys (2008) and The Royal Gambler (2016). She starred in the crime thriller Netflix drama series A Model Family (2022).

== Career ==
Yoon has starred in films such as Oldboy, All for Love, A Good Day to Have an Affair, and Secret Love. She also appeared in a variety of TV series — historical drama The Return of Iljimae, action comedy The Fugitive: Plan B, and cable romantic comedy 12 Signs of Love.

Yoon was a contributing writer at Movieweek magazine, writing 11 articles over the period of 2010 to 2011 under the column 윤진서의 롤링 페이퍼 ("Yoon Jin-seo's Rolling Paper").

In November 2012, Yoon signed on to be exclusively managed by FNC Entertainment.

In January 2021, Yoon left FNC Entertainment and signed with new agency Big Picture Entertainment.

== Personal life ==
Yoon adheres to a vegetarian diet for ethics and health reasons.

She dated baseball player Lee Taek-Keun who then played for LG Twins from 2009 to 2010.

In June 2012, Yoon was hospitalized following an alleged suicide attempt, which her agency denied, saying it had been an accidental overdose of cold medicine.

Yoon and her boyfriend had a private wedding sometime in 2017 after three years of dating. As of 2018, she stated that she will spend her free time in Jeju Island, enjoying surfing and spending time with her husband following their honeymoon. On July 6, 2023, Yoon's agency confirmed her pregnancy. She gave birth to their first child, a daughter, on January 21, 2024.

== Filmography ==
=== Film ===
| Year | Title | Role | Notes/Ref. |
|---|---|---|---|
| 2001 | A Perfect Day | Noona | |
| 2001 | L'abri, Bus Stop | | |
| 2002 | Chi-hwa-seon | | |
| 2003 | Mobile | | short film in Show Me |
| 2003 | Oldboy | Lee Soo-ah | |
| 2004 | Alone Together | | short film in Twentidentity |
| 2004 | My New Boyfriend | | short film |
| 2004 | Mr. Gam's Victory | Park Eun-ah | |
| 2005 | Sympathy for Lady Vengeance | Prisoner (cameo) | |
| 2005 | All for Love | Im Soo-kyung | |
| 2005 | Bravo, My Life | Eun-sook | |
| 2006 | Shall I Cry? | Yeong-nam | unreleased |
| 2007 | A Good Day to Have an Affair | Jak Eun-se ("small bird") | |
| 2007 | Someone Behind You | Kim Ga-in | |
| 2008 | Beastie Boys | Ji-won | |
| 2008 | Action Boys | Herself (cameo) | documentary |
| 2008 | Iri | Jin-seo | |
| 2010 | Secret Love | Yeon-yi | |
| 2011 | Sunday Punch | Ha-young | |
| 2012 | Give Me Back My Cat | | short film |
| 2012 | Ari Ari the Korean Cinema | Herself | documentary |
| 2013 | Do You Hear She Sings? | Jin-kyung | |
| 2014 | Gyeongju | Yeo-jeong | |
| 2014 | Santa Barbara | Soo-kyung | |
| 2015 | Heartbreak Hotel | Sarah | |
| 2017 | Coffee Mate | In-young | |

=== Television series ===
| Year | Title | Role |
|---|---|---|
| 2003 | Nursery Story: "Christmas Lovers" | |
| 2004 | Lovers in Paris | Girl on the beach (ep 20) |
| 2004 | Jung Mal-geum, Action Movie Star | Mal-geum |
| 2009 | The Return of Iljimae | Dal-yi / Wol-hee |
| 2010 | The Fugitive: Plan B | Yoon So-ran |
| 2012 | 12 Signs of Love | Na Mi-ru |
| 2013 | The Heirs | Cha Eun-seok (cameo, ep 1) |
| 2013 | KBS Drama Special: "Jin Jin" | Seo Ha-jin |
| 2015 | A Girl Who Sees Smells | Yeom Mi |
| 2015 | Table For One | Ra Yeo-joo |
| 2016 | The Royal Gambler | Sukbin Choe |
| 2020 | Drama Stage: "Out of Communication Range" | Cha Seon-yeong |
| 2022 | A Model Family | Eun-ju |

=== Variety show ===
| Year | Title | Notes |
|---|---|---|
| 2008 | Street Sound Take 1 | Host |
| 2009 | Trend Report Feel - Season 3 | Host |
| 2014 | Fashion King Korea - Season 2 | Cast member |
| 2019 | A Man Who Feeds The Dog (Season 3) | Cast member |

=== Music video appearances ===
| Year | Song title | Artist | Co-star |
|---|---|---|---|
| 2004 | "Heffy End" | Seo Taiji | |
| 2004 | "Robot" | Seo Taiji | |
| 2005 | "One's Way Back" | Naul | Hwang Jung-min |
| 2009 | "How Are You" | Jungyup | |
| 2010 | "It Passes By" | Kim Bum-soo | |
| 2011 | "Threads of Your Clothes" | M Signal | Bae Soo-bin |

== Discography ==
| Year | Title | Notes/Ref. |
|---|---|---|
| | "Earth Song" | |
| 2008 | "L'Amourse" | Single |
| 2009 | "내가 꿈꾸는 그 곳" | track from The Return of Iljimae OST |

== Awards and nominations ==
| Year | Award | Category | Nominated work | Result |
|---|---|---|---|---|
| 2004 | 40th Baeksang Arts Awards | Best New Actress – Film | Oldboy | Won |
| 2004 | 3rd Korean Film Awards | Best Supporting Actress | Oldboy | Nominated |
| 2009 | 45th Baeksang Arts Awards | Most Popular Actress | The Moonlight of Seoul | Nominated |
| 2014 | 1st Wildflower Film Awards | Best Actress | Do You Hear She Sings? | Nominated |
| 2016 | SBS Drama Awards | Top Excellence Award, Actress in a Serial Drama | The Royal Gambler | Nominated |
