= List of awards and nominations received by Son Ye-jin =

Son Ye-jin awards and nominations
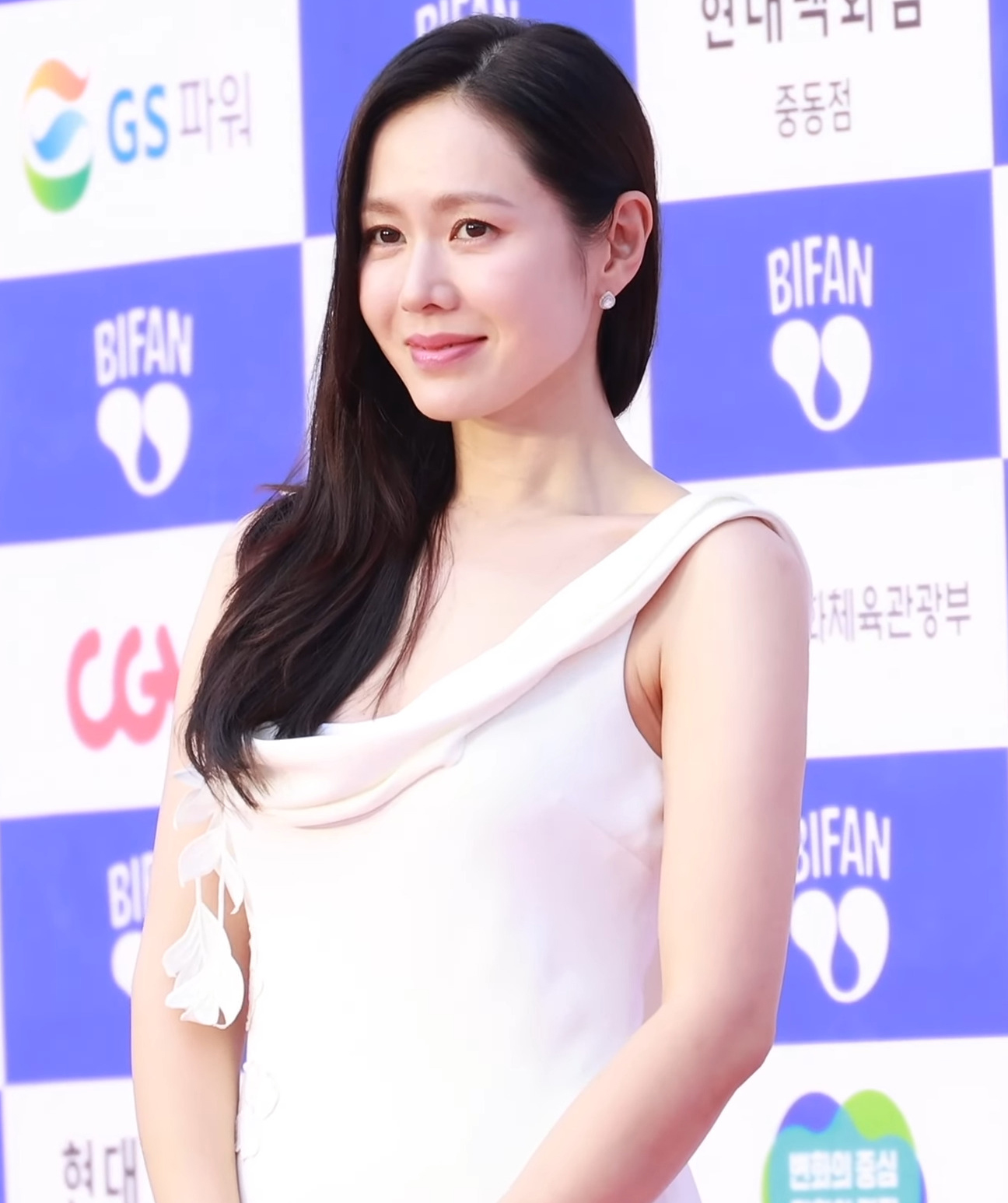
- Son in 2024
Awards and nominations
Award	Wins	Nominations

Totals (Note: Certain award groups do not simply award one winner. They acknowledge several different recipients, have runners-up, and have third place. Since this is a specific recognition and is different from losing an award, runner-up mentions are considered wins in this award tally. For simplification and to avoid errors, each award in this list has been presumed to have had a prior nomination.)
- Wins: 52
- Nominations: 79

This is a list of awards and nominations received by South Korean actress Son Ye-jin. She has been the recipient of numerous awards, including six Baeksang Arts Awards, four Grand Bell Awards, six Blue Dragon Film Awards, and an Asia Pacific Film Festival. Throughout the course of her career, Son has won a total of 48 awards and commendations, including 25 awards for acting. She is the youngest person to have achieved the "Grand Slam" of acting, having won all three major Korean film awards for Best Lead Actress (Baeksang, Grand Bell, and Blue Dragon) by age 34, all for different roles.

== Awards and nominations ==
Name of the award ceremony, year presented, category, nominee of the award, and the result of the nomination
Award	Year	Category	Nominee / Work	Result	Ref.
APAN Star Awards	2018	Grand Prize (Daesang) (Note: A Daesang (Korean: 대상), which translates to "Grand Prize", is the highest honor given out at South Korean award ceremonies.)	Something in the Rain	Nominated	
APAN Star Awards	2021	Top Excellence Award, Actress in a Miniseries	Crash Landing on You	Nominated	
APAN Star Awards	2021	Popularity Award	Crash Landing on You	Won	
Asia Model Awards	2007	Model Star Award	Son Ye-jin	Won	
Asian Film Awards	2017	Best Actress	The Last Princess	Nominated	
Asian Film Critics Association Awards	2009	Best Actress	My Wife Got Married	Nominated	
Asia Pacific Film Festival	2006	Best Actress	April Snow	Won	
Asia-Pacific Producer's Network Awards	2010	Award for Figure in Asian Film	Son Ye-jin	Won	
Asian Television Awards	2019	Best Actress in a Leading Role	Something in the Rain	Nominated	
Baeksang Arts Awards	2003	Best New Actress – Film	The Classic	Won	
Baeksang Arts Awards	2007	Best Actress – Television	Alone in Love	Won	
Baeksang Arts Awards	2009	Best Actress – Film	My Wife Got Married	Won	
Baeksang Arts Awards	2010	InStyle Award	Son Ye-jin	Won	
Baeksang Arts Awards	2012	Best Actress – Film	Spellbound	Nominated	
Baeksang Arts Awards	2015	Best Actress – Film	The Pirates	Nominated	
Baeksang Arts Awards	2017	Best Actress – Film	The Last Princess	Won	
Baeksang Arts Awards	2018	Best Actress – Film	Be with You	Nominated	
Baeksang Arts Awards	2020	Best Actress – Television	Crash Landing on You	Nominated	
Baeksang Arts Awards	2020	Most Popular Actress	Crash Landing on You	Won	
Baeksang Arts Awards	2026	Best Actress – Film	No Other Choice	Nominated	
Blue Dragon Film Awards	2002	Best New Actress	Lovers' Concerto	Nominated	
Blue Dragon Film Awards	2003	Popular Star Award	The Classic	Won	
Blue Dragon Film Awards	2005	Best Actress	April Snow	Nominated	
Blue Dragon Film Awards	2008	Best Actress	My Wife Got Married	Won	
Blue Dragon Film Awards	2008	Popular Star Award	My Wife Got Married	Won	
Blue Dragon Film Awards	2008	Best Couple Award	Son Ye-jin with Kim Joo-hyuk; My Wife Got Married	Won	
Blue Dragon Film Awards	2010	Popular Star Award	White Night	Won	
Blue Dragon Film Awards	2014	Best Actress	Blood and Ties	Nominated	
Blue Dragon Film Awards	2016	Best Actress	The Last Princess	Nominated	
Blue Dragon Film Awards	2016	Popular Star Award	The Last Princess	Won	
Blue Dragon Film Awards	2025	Best Actress	No Other Choice	Won	
Blue Dragon Film Awards	2025	Popular Star Award	No Other Choice	Won	
Buil Film Awards	2009	Best Actress	My Wife Got Married	Nominated	
Buil Film Awards	2016	Best Actress	The Truth Beneath	Won	
Buil Film Awards	2026	Best Actress	No Other Choice	Nominated	
Bucheon International Fantastic Film Festival	2014	Producer's Choice Award	Son Ye-jin	Won	
Busan Film Critics Awards	2016	Best Actress	The Truth Beneath	Won	
China Golden Rooster and Hundred Flowers Film Festival	2006	Best Actress in a Foreign Film	A Moment to Remember	Won	
Chunsa Film Art Awards	2005	Best Actress	April Snow	Nominated	
Chunsa Film Art Awards	2017	Best Actress	The Truth Beneath	Won	
Director's Cut Awards	2026	Best Actress	No Other Choice	Nominated	
Elle Style Awards	2018	Super Icon (Female)	Son Ye-jin	Won	
Golden Cinematography Awards	2026	Best Actress	No Other Choice	Won	
Grand Bell Awards	2003	Best New Actress	The Classic	Won	
Grand Bell Awards	2003	Popularity Award	The Classic	Won	
Grand Bell Awards	2014	Best Actress	The Pirates	Won	
Grand Bell Awards	2016	Best Actress	The Last Princess	Won	
KBS Drama Awards	2003	Excellence Award, Actress	Summer Scent	Nominated	
KBS Drama Awards	2013	Top Excellence Award, Actress	Shark	Nominated	
KBS Drama Awards	2013	Excellence Award, Actress in a Mid-length Drama	Shark	Nominated	
KOFRA Film Awards	2017	Best Actress	The Last Princess	Won	
Korean Association of Film Critics Awards	2002	Best New Actress	Lovers' Concerto	Won	
Korean Association of Film Critics Awards	2016	Best Actress	The Truth Beneath	Won	
Korea Best Dresser Awards	2007	Best Dressed - Female Movie Star	Son Ye-jin	Won	
Korea Fashion & Design Awards	2008	Fashion Icon Award	Son Ye-jin	Won	
Korean Film Awards	2002	Best New Actress	Lovers' Concerto	Nominated	
Korean Film Awards	2003	Best New Actress	The Classic	Nominated	
Korean Film Awards	2008	Best Actress	My Wife Got Married	Nominated	
Korea Film Actors Association's Star Night — Korea Top Star Awards	2014	Korean Top Star	The Pirates	Won	
Korean Film Producers Association Awards	2016	Best Actress	The Truth Beneath, The Last Princess	Won	
Korea International Jewelry & Watch Fair	2006	Best Jewelry Lady	Son Ye-jin	Won	
Korea Jewelry Awards	2008	Diamond Award	Son Ye-jin	Won	
Max Movie Awards	2015	Best Actress	The Pirates	Nominated	
MBC Drama Awards	2001	Best New Actress	Delicious Proposal	Won	
Midnight Critics Circle	2026	Best Supporting Actress	No Other Choice	Nominated	
Moscow International Love Film Festival	2004	Best Couple Award	Son Ye-jin (with Cho Seung-woo); The Classic	Won	
SBS Drama Awards	2006	Top Excellence Award, Actress	Alone in Love	Won	
SBS Drama Awards	2006	Top 10 Stars	Alone in Love	Won	
Seoul Arts & Culture Awards	2010	Best Actress	White Night	Won	
Seoul International Drama Awards	2018	Outstanding Korean Actress	Something in the Rain	Won	
Seoul International Drama Awards	2020	Outstanding Korean Actress	Crash Landing on You	Won	
Style Icon Awards	2008	Style Icon - Actress	Son Ye-jin	Won	
Style Icon Awards	2008	Fun Fearless Female	Son Ye-jin	Won	
The Seoul Awards	2018	Best Actress (Film)	Be with You	Won	
The Seoul Awards	2018	Popularity Award (Film)	Be with You	Won	
The Seoul Awards	2018	Best Actress (Drama)	Something in the Rain	Nominated	
University Film Festival of Korea	2008	Best Actress	My Wife Got Married	Won	
KOPA & NIKON Press Photo Awards	2015	Most Photogenic Actress	Son Ye-jin	Won	
Women in Film Korea Awards	2016	Best Actress	The Truth Beneath	Won	

== Other accolades ==
=== State honors ===
Name of the organization, year presented, and the honor or award given
Country	Ceremony	Year	Honor / Award	Ref.
South Korea	Bucheon International Fantastic Film Festival	2024	Actor Special Exhibition	
South Korea	Daegu Cultural Center Association	2024	Daegu Cultural Person Award	
South Korea	Korean Popular Culture and Arts Awards (Note: Hosted the Korea Creative Content Agency and the Ministry of Culture, Sports and Tourism. They are awarded to those who have contributed to the arts and South Korea's pop culture.)	2018	Prime Minister's Commendation	

=== Listicles ===
Name of publisher, year listed, name of listicle, and placement
Publisher	Year	List	Rank	Ref.
Forbes	2019	Korea Power Celebrity 40	31st	
Forbes	2020	Korea Power Celebrity 40	24th	
Forbes	2021	Korea Power Celebrity 40	27th	
Forbes	2022	Korea Power Celebrity 40	30th	
Gallup Korea	2008	Gallup Korea's Film Actor of the Year	2nd (Note: Highest position an actress has ever ranked in the list)	
Gallup Korea	2018	Gallup Korea's Television Actor of the Year	5th	
Gallup Korea	2020	Gallup Korea's Television Actor of the Year	5th	
Gallup Korea	2024	Best Television Couple of the Past Decade (Note: With Hyun Bin for Crash Landing on You (2019))	1st	
Gallup Korea	2025	Gallup Korea's Film Actor of the Year	8th	
Korean Film Council	2021	Korean Actors 200 (Note: The list introduces the 200 actors that best represent the present and future of Korean cinema to the people in the film industry all over the world.)	Included	
The Screen	2009	1984–2008 Top Box Office Powerhouse Actors in Korean Movies	41st (Note: The youngest of only five woman on the list, and the person with the shortest career with only 7 years of professional activity)	
The Screen	2019	2009–2019 Top Box Office Powerhouse Actors in Korean Movies	19th (Note: The second highest ranked woman on the list, only beaten in 18th place by child actress Kim Hyang-gi, who appeared in two of the highest grossing blockbusters)	
