= Blue Dragon Film Award for Best Actress =

Blue Dragon South Korean Film Awards

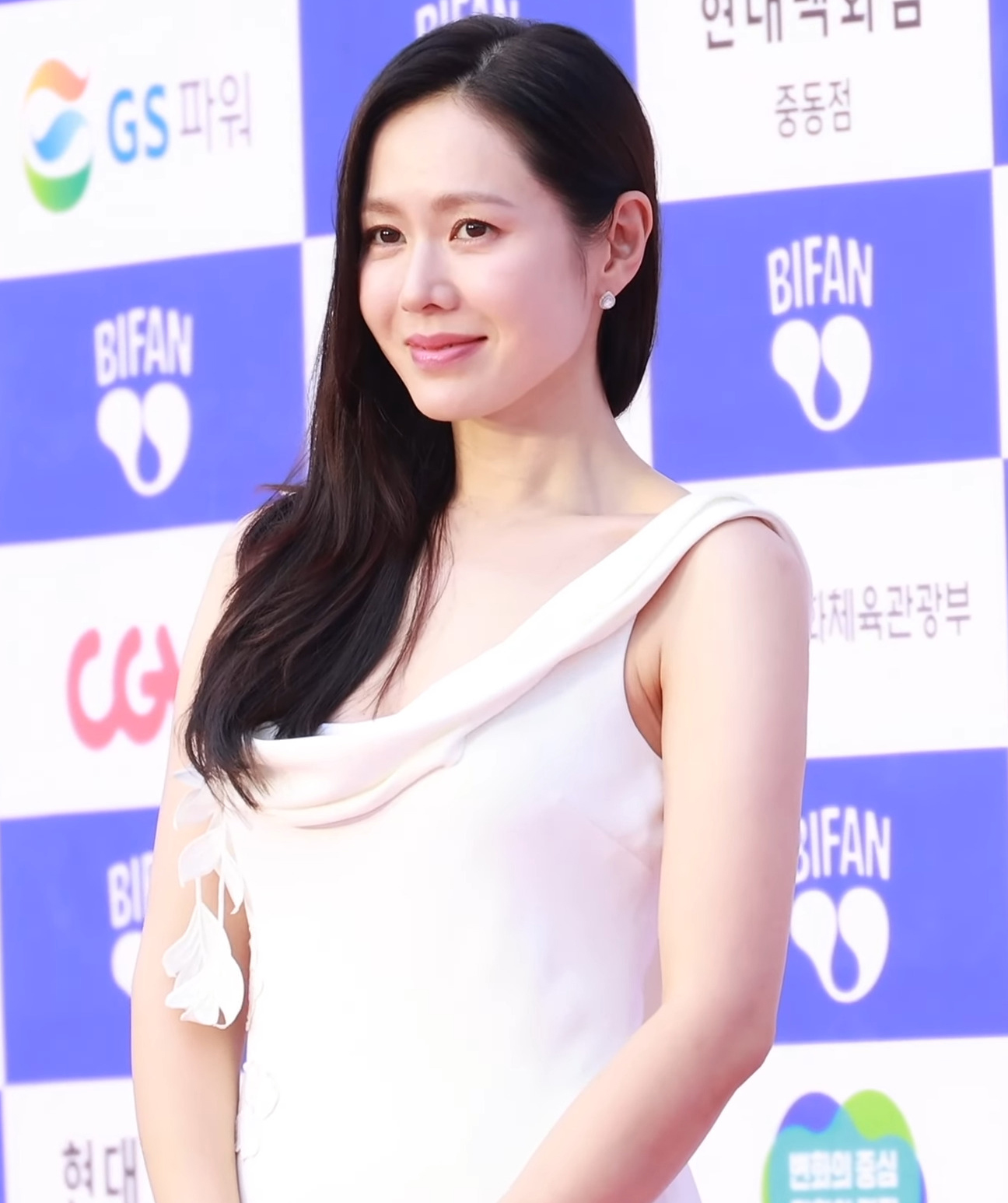
- The 2025 recipient: Son Ye-jin
- Awarded for: Best Actress
- Country: South Korea
- Presented by: Blue Dragon Film Awards
- First award: 1963
- Currently held by: Son Ye-jin
- Website: blueaward.co.kr

The Blue Dragon Film Award for Best Actress is one of the awards that is presented annually at the Blue Dragon Film Awards by Sports Chosun, which is typically held at the end of the year.

== Winners and nominees ==
Table key
‡	Indicates the winner

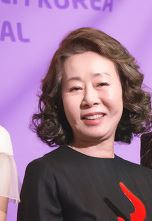
Youn Yuh-jung won for her role in Woman of Fire

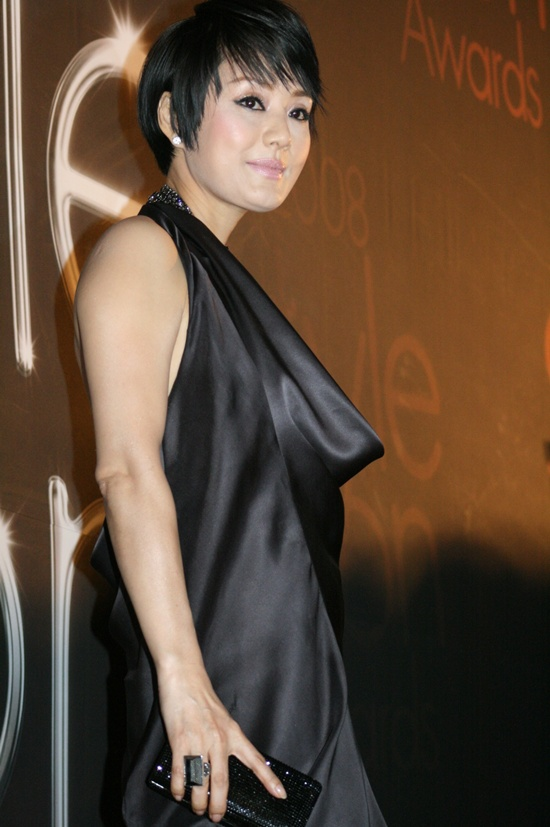
Chang Mi-hee won for her role in Death Song

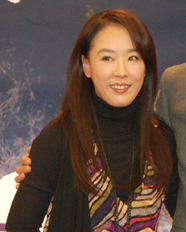
Kang Soo-yeon won for her role in Road to the Racetrack

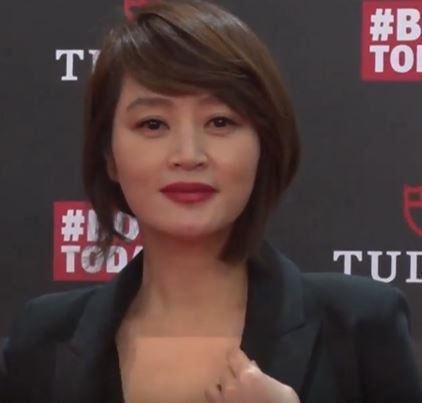
Kim Hye-soo has the most wins in this category for her roles in First Love, Dr. Bong and Tazza: The High Rollers

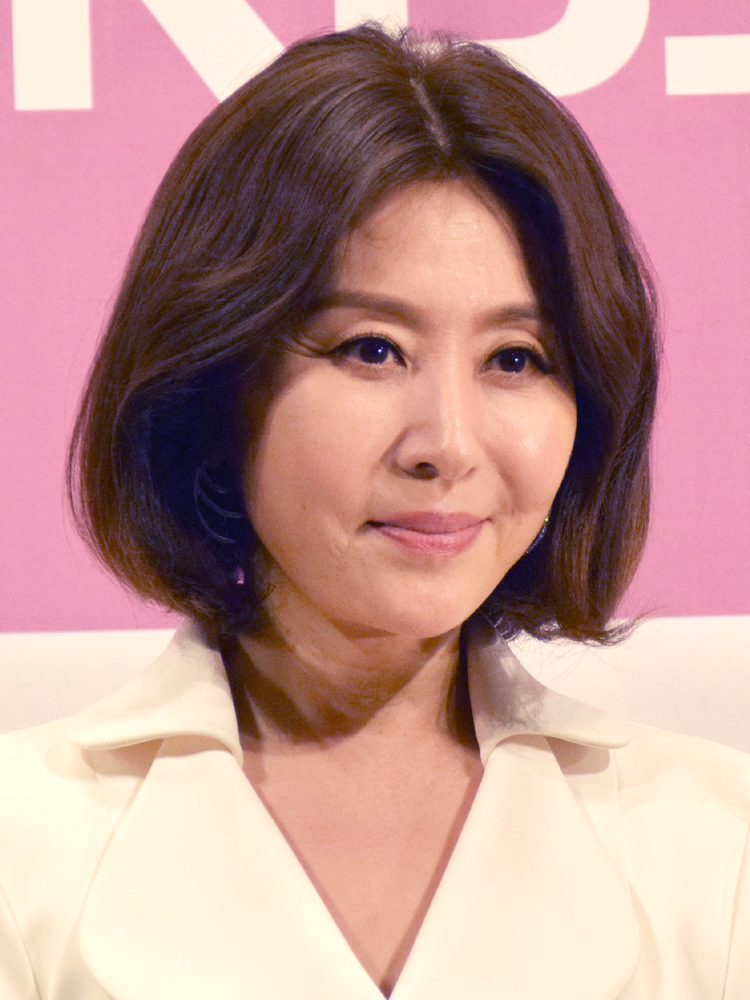
Choi Myung-gil won for her role in Rosy Life

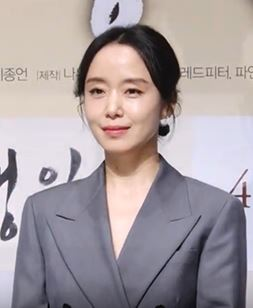
Jeon Do-yeon won for her roles in The Harmonium in My Memory, and Secret Sunshine

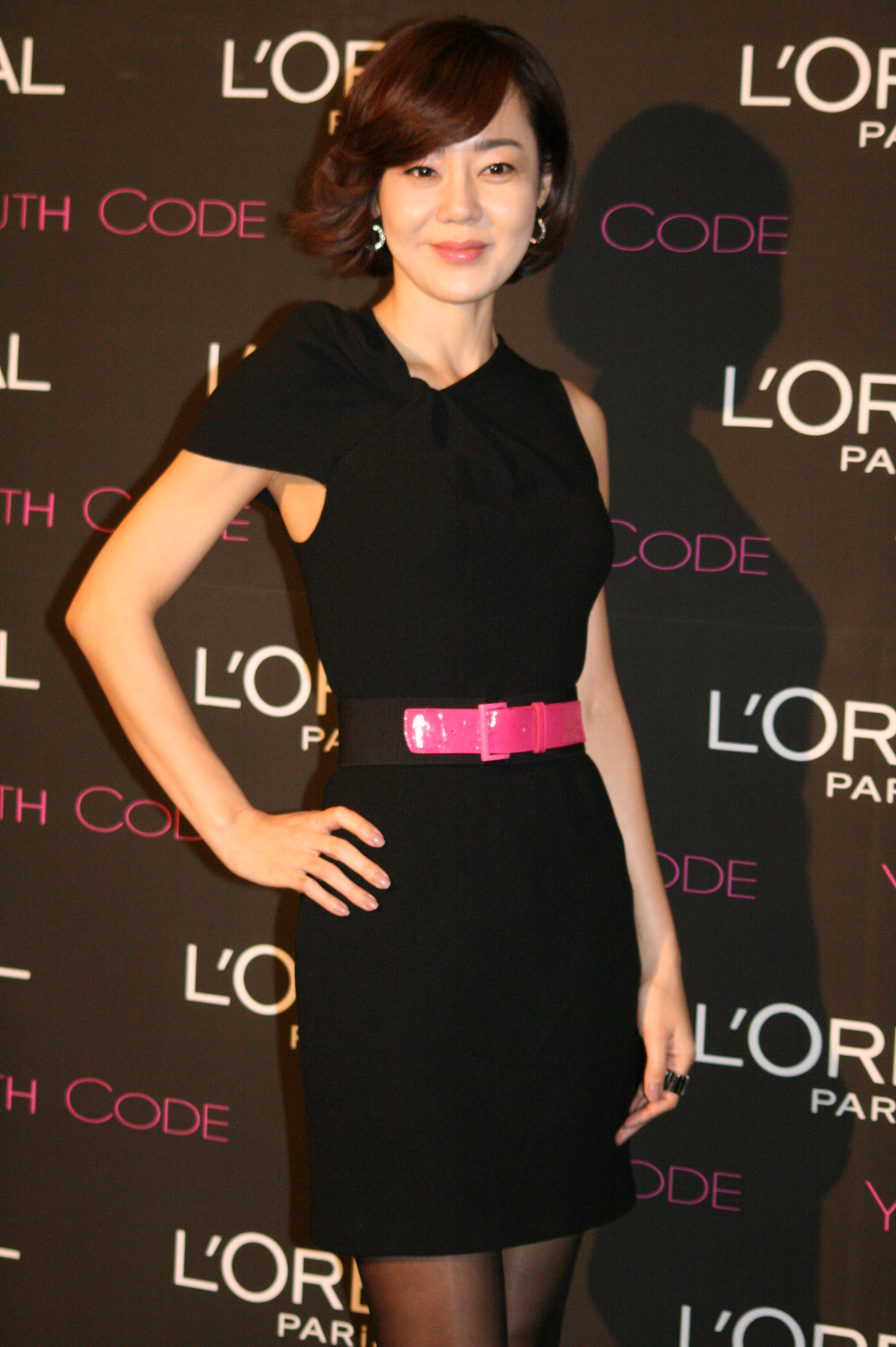
Yunjin Kim won for her role in Ardor

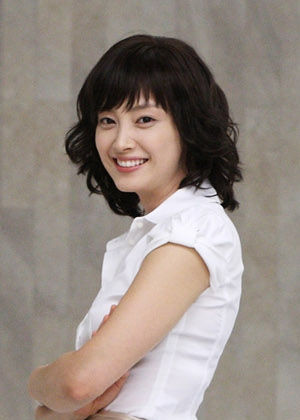
Lee Na-young won for her role in Someone Special

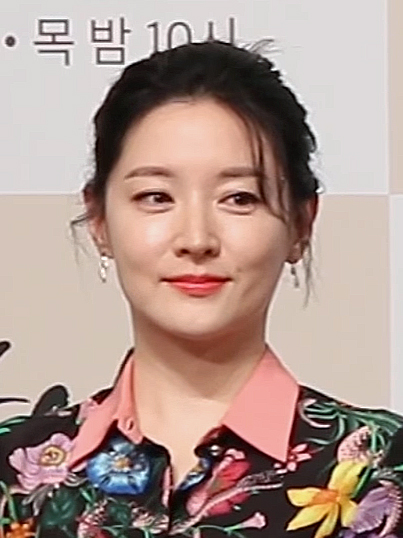
Lee Young-ae won for her role in Sympathy for Lady Vengeance

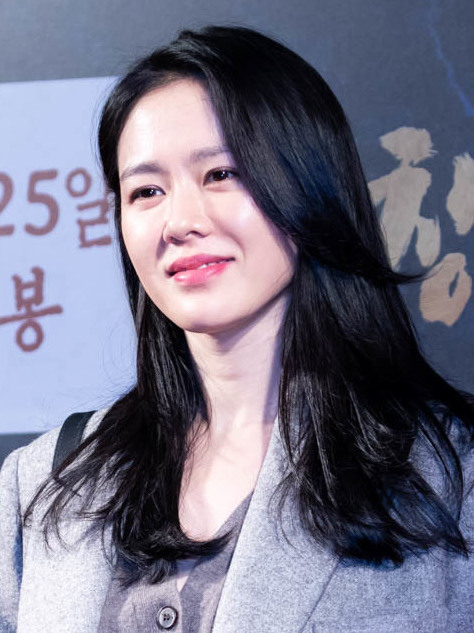
Son Ye-jin won for her role in My Wife Got Married

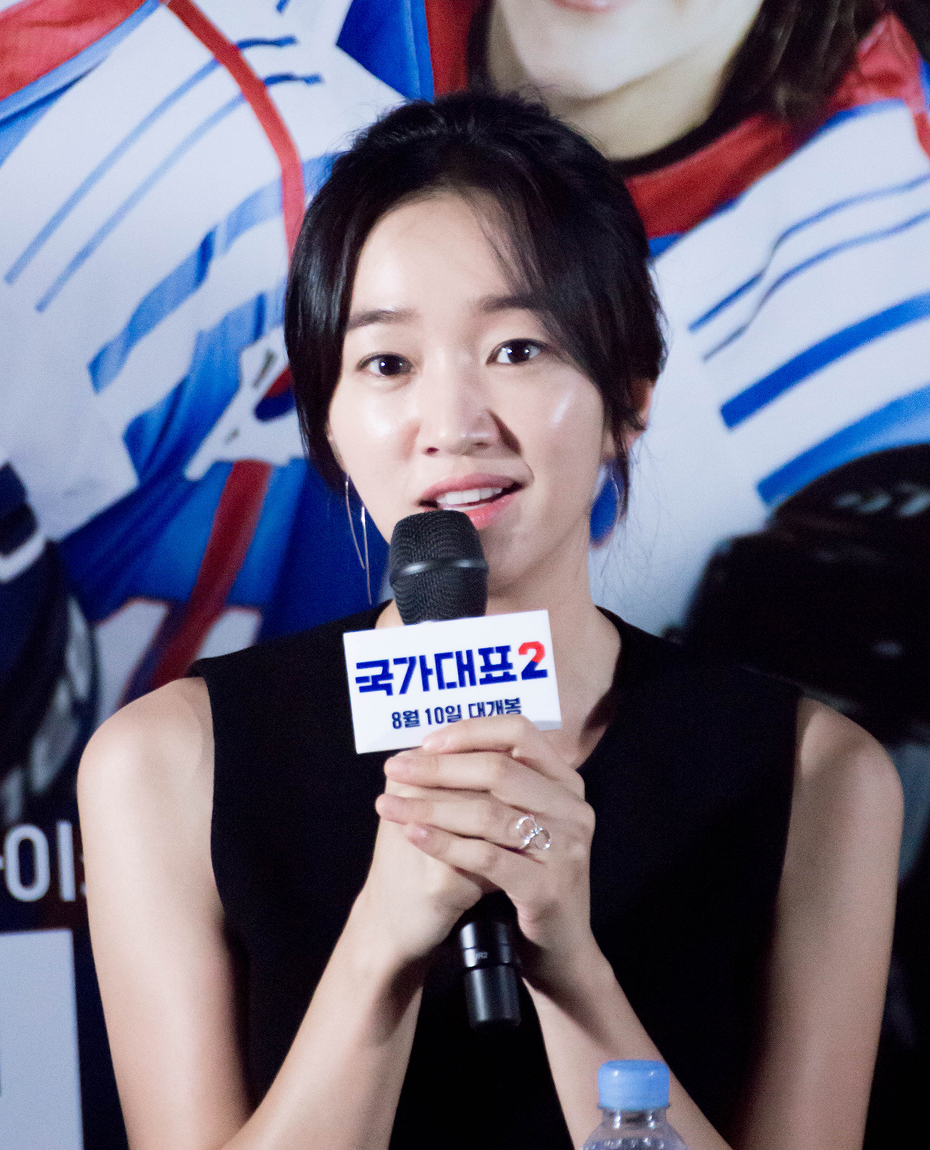
Soo Ae won for her role in Midnight FM

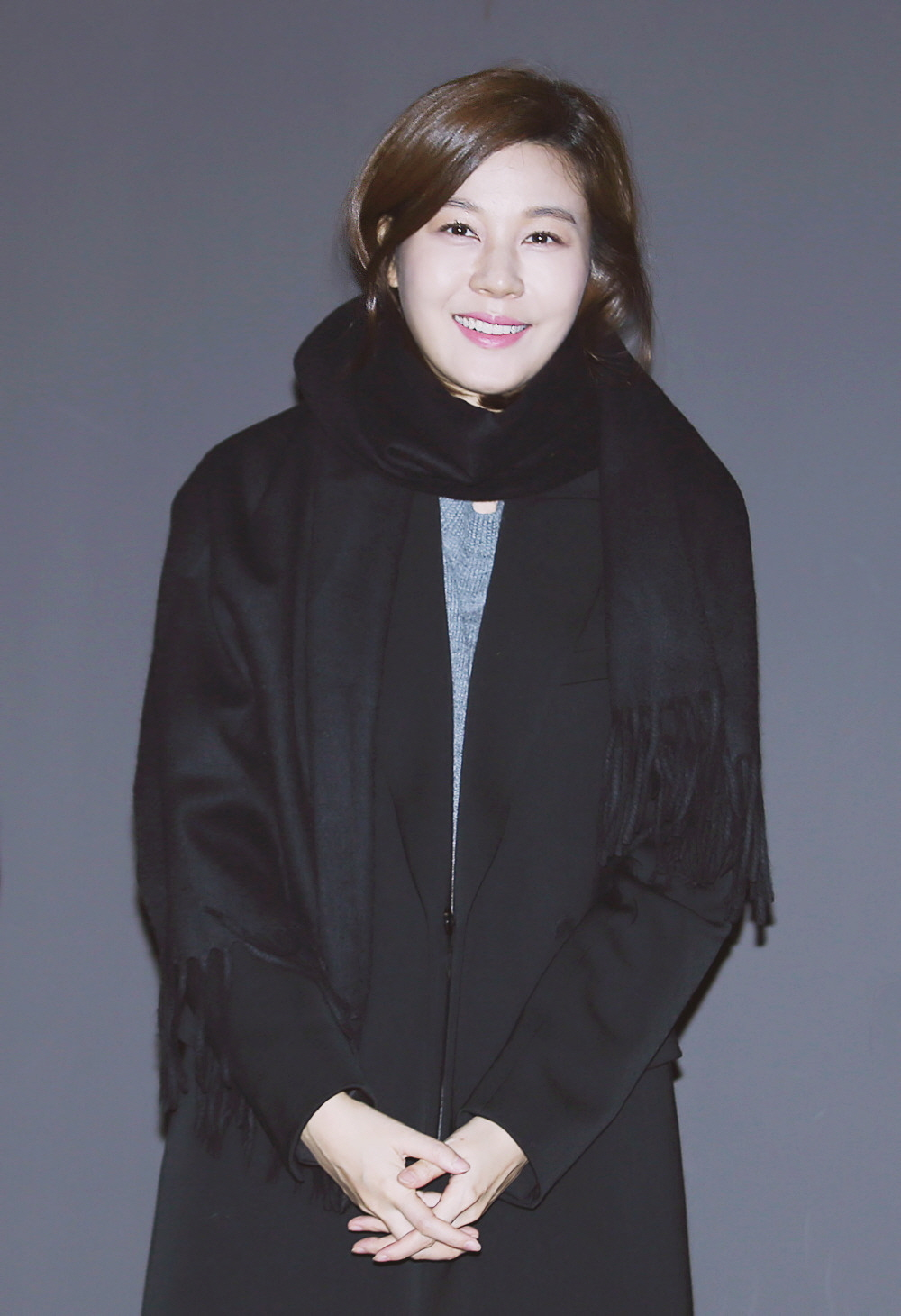
Kim Ha-neul won for her role in Blind

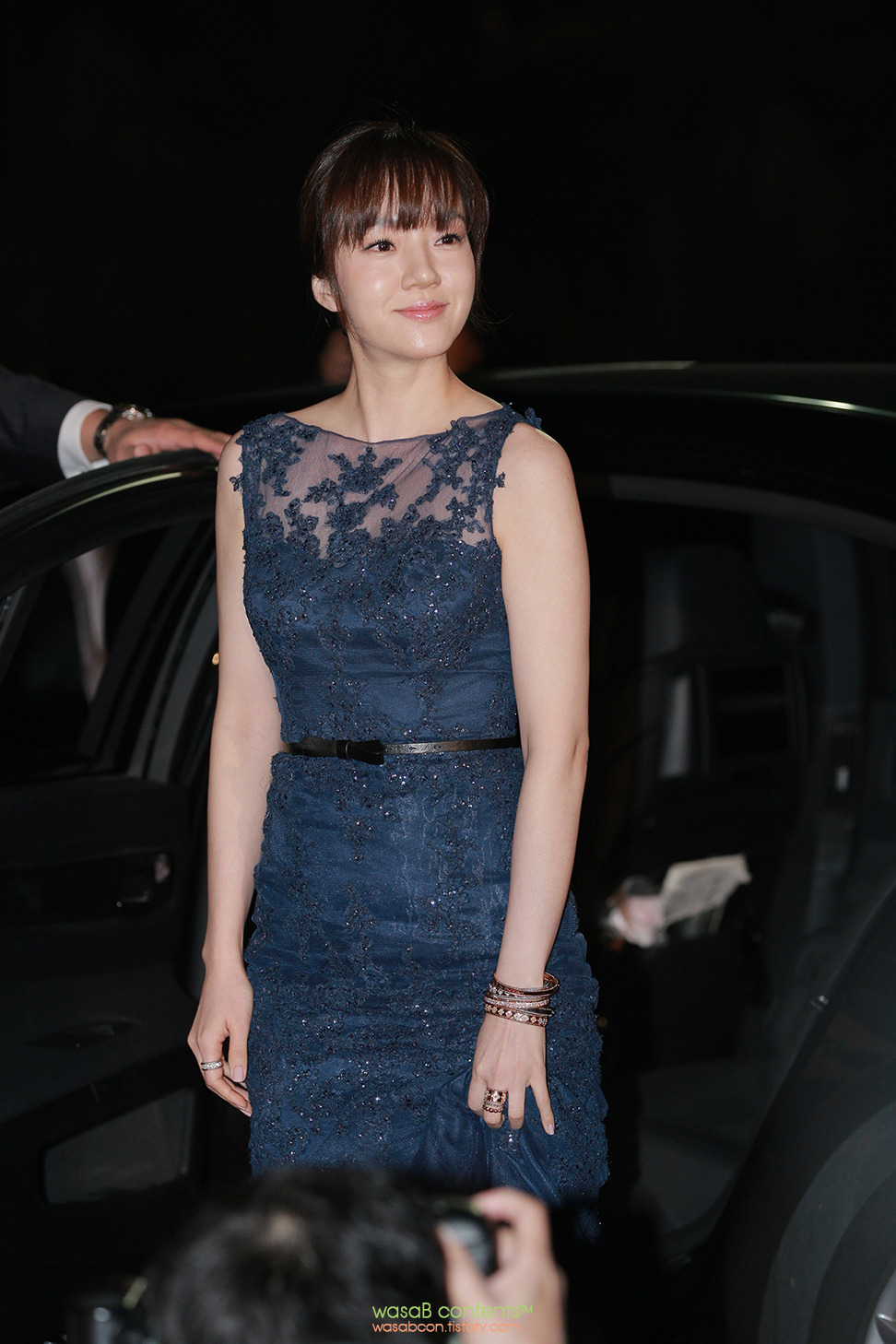
Im Soo-jung won for her role in All About My Wife

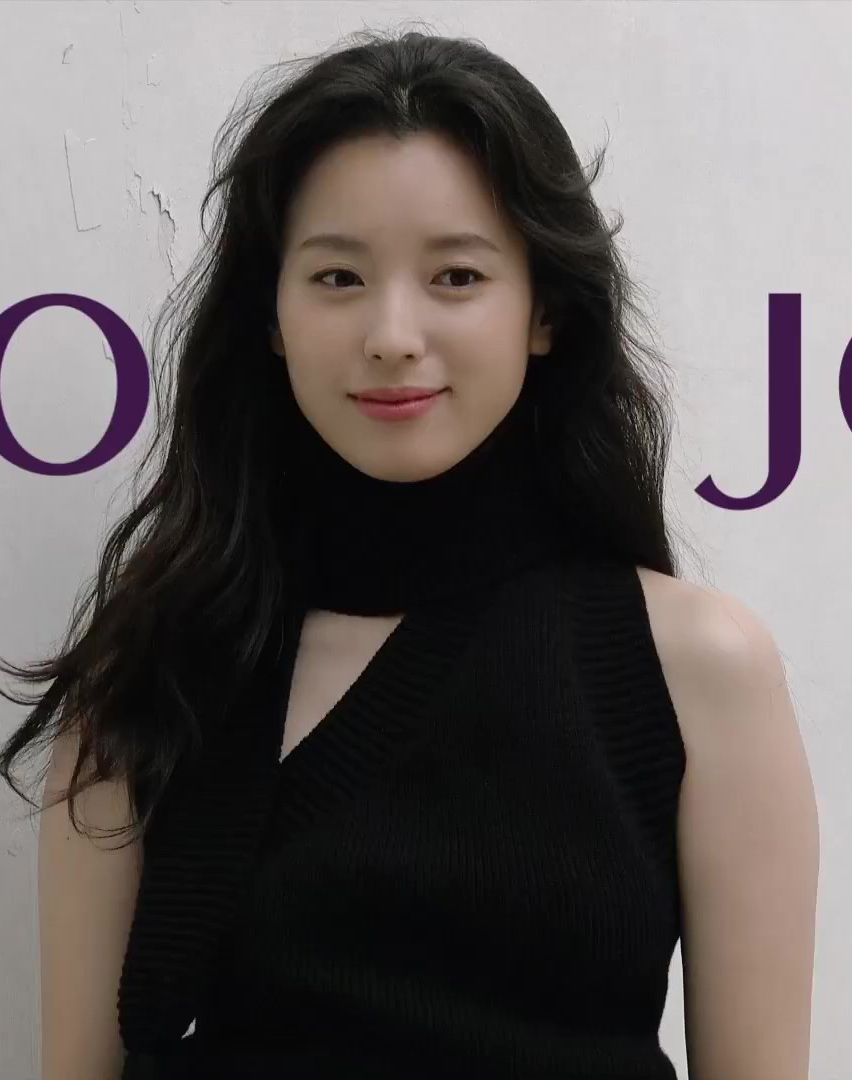
Han Hyo-joo won for her role in Cold Eyes

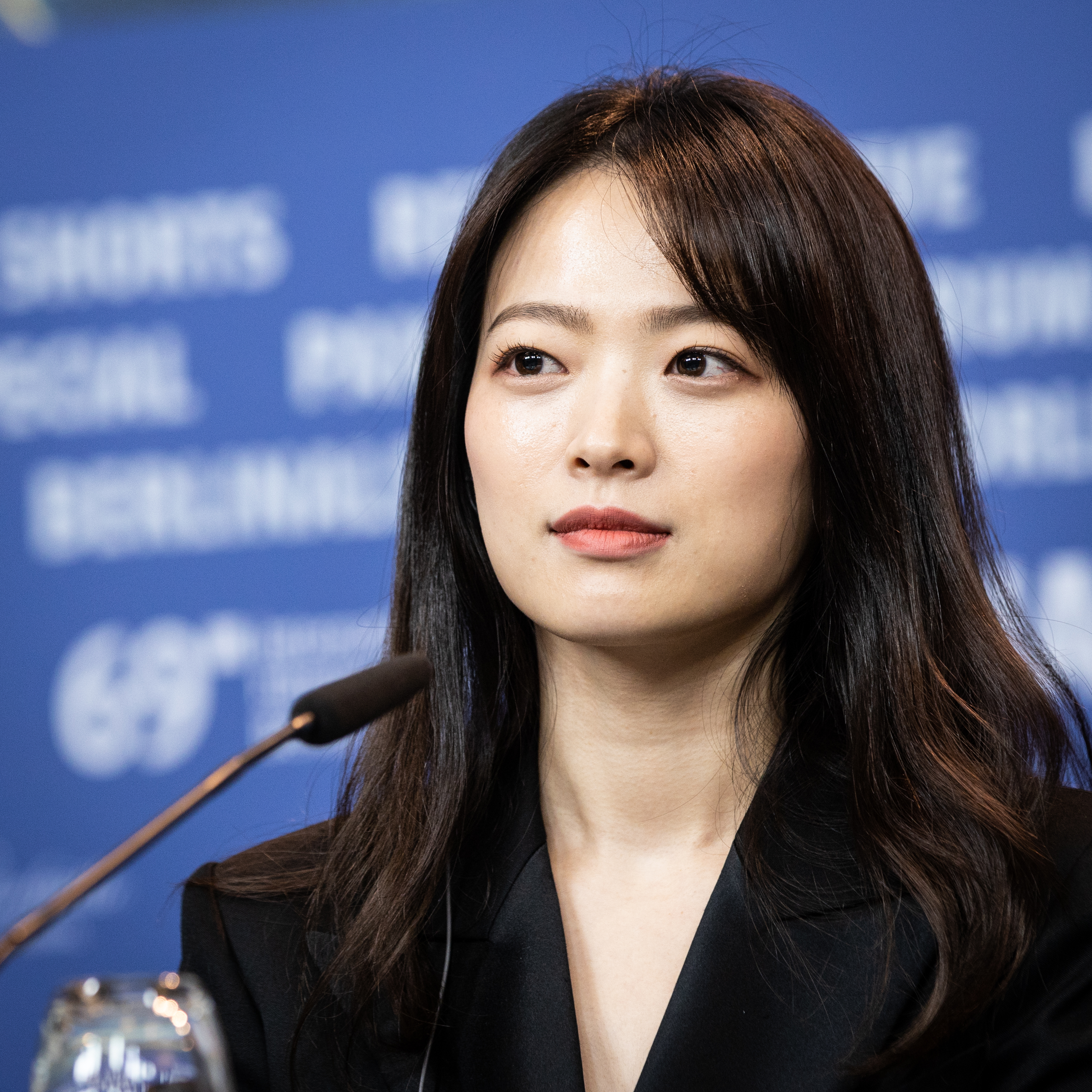
Chun Woo-hee won for her role in Han Gong-ju

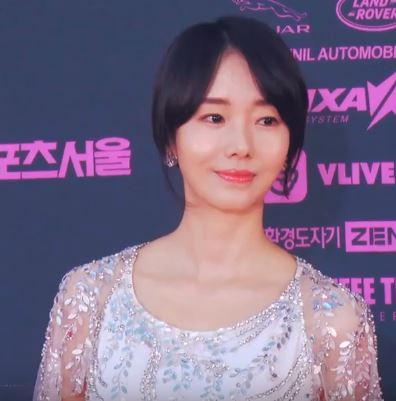
Lee Jung-hyun won for her role in Alice in Earnestland

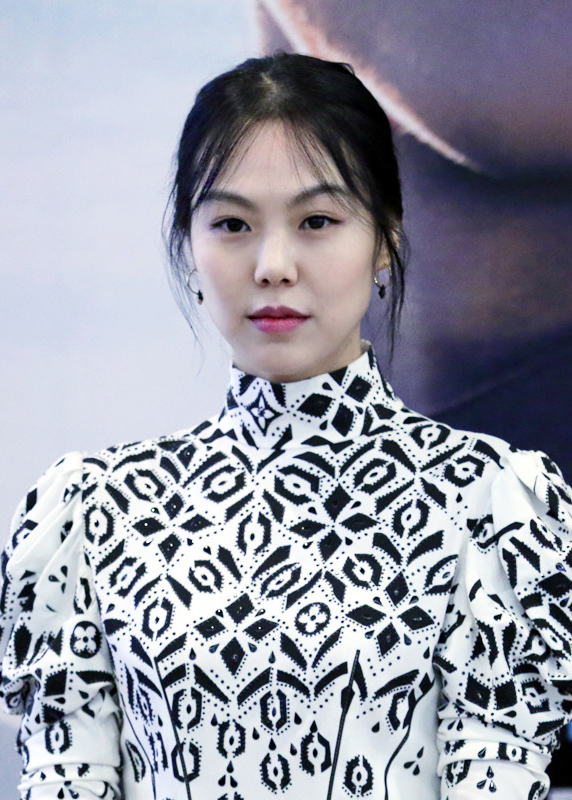
Kim Min-hee won for her role in The Handmaiden

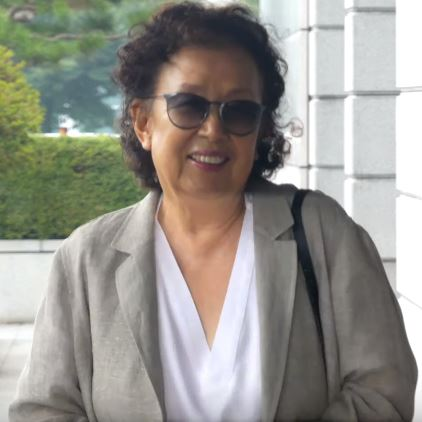
Na Moon-hee won for her role in I Can Speak

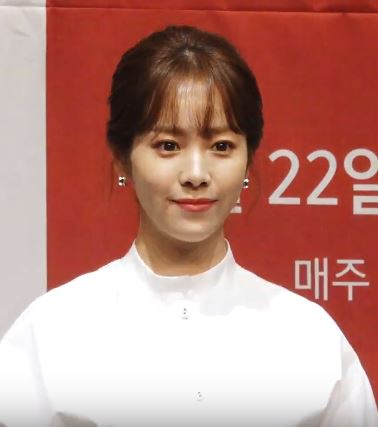
Han Ji-min won for her role in Miss Baek

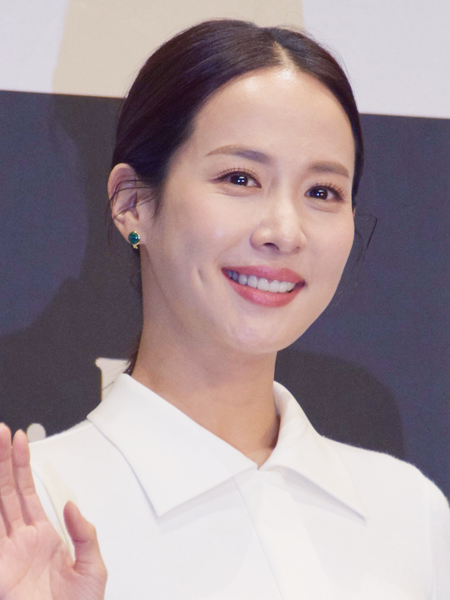
Cho Yeo-jeong won for her role in Parasite

=== 1960s ===
Year	Winner	Film	Original title	Role(s)
1960s
1963 (1st)	Hwang Jung-seun ‡	Bloodline	혈맥	Bok-soong's mother
1964 (2nd)	Moon Jung-suk ‡	Never Look Back	돌아보지 마라	
1965 (3rd)	Um Aing-ran ‡	The Beautiful Eyes	아름다운 눈동자	
1966 (4th)	Moon Jung-suk ‡	Market	시장	
1967 (5th)	Ju Jeung-ryu ‡	Flame in the Valley	산불	
1969 (6th)	Nam Jeong-im ‡	Bun-nyeo	분녀	

=== 1970s ===
Year	Winner	Film	Original title	Role(s)
1970 (7th)	Kim Ji-mee ‡	Your Name Is Women	너의 이름은 여자	
1971 (8th)	Youn Yuh-jung ‡	Woman of Fire	화녀	Myeong-ja
1972 (9th)	Yoon Jeong-hee ‡	Oyster Village	석화촌	
1973 (10th)	Yoon Jeong-hee ‡	Shim Cheong	효녀 심청	

=== 1990s ===
Year	Winner	Film	Original title	Role(s)
1990 (11th)	Won Mi-kyung ‡	Only Because You Are a Woman	단지 그대가 여자라는 이유만으로	Lim Jung-hee
1990 (11th)	Kang Soo-yeon	All That Falls Has Wings	추락하는 것은 날개가 있다	Yoon-ju
1990 (11th)	Choi Myung-gil	The Lovers of Woomook-baemi	우묵배미의 사랑	Gong-ryae
1990 (11th)	Hwang Shin-hye	The Woman Who Walks on Water	물위를 걷는 여자	Nan-hee
1991 (12th)	Chang Mi-hee ‡	Death Song	사의 찬미	Yun Sim-deok
1991 (12th)	Lee Hye-sook	Silver Stallion	은마는 오지 않는다	Eon-rae
1991 (12th)	Lee Hye-young	Fly High Run Far	개벽	Hae-weol's Wife
1991 (12th)	Choi Jin-sil	Susanne Brink's Arirang	수잔 브링크의 아리랑	Susanne
1991 (12th)	Hwang Shin-hye	Seoul Evita	서울, 에비타	Lee Sun-Young
1992 (13th)	Kang Soo-yeon ‡	Road to the Racetrack	경마장 가는 길	J
1992 (13th)	Lee Hye-sook	Kim's War	김의 전쟁	Hu Sa-ko
1992 (13th)	Bae Jong-ok	Walking Up to Heaven	걸어서 하늘까지	Ji-suk
1992 (13th)	Choi Jin-sil	A Room in the Woods	숲속의 방	So Yang
1993 (14th)	Kim Hye-soo ‡	First Love	첫사랑	Park Young-shin
1993 (14th)	Kang Soo-yeon	Blue In You	그대 안의 블루	Yu-rim
1993 (14th)	Kim Hee-ae	The 101st Proposition	101번째 프로포즈	Jung-won
1993 (14th)	Park Sun-young	A Different Kind of Man	가슴 달린 남자	Kim Hye-seon
1993 (14th)	Oh Jung-hae	Seopyeonje	서편제	Song-hwa
1994 (15th)	Choi Myung-gil ‡	Rosy Life	장미빛 인생	Madam
1994 (15th)	Shim Hye-jin	Out To The World	세상 밖으로	Hye-jin
1994 (15th)	Choi Jin-sil	I Wish For What Is Forbidden To Me	나는 소망한다 내게 금지된 것을	Kang Min‑ju
1994 (15th)	Kang Soo-yeon	Rosy Days	장미의 나날	Jae‑hee
1994 (15th)	Jung Sun-kyung	To You From Me	너에게 나를 보낸다	Woman
1995 (16th)	Kim Hye-soo ‡	Dr. Bong	닥터 봉	Hwang Yeo-jin
1995 (16th)	Bang Eun-jin ‡	301, 302	301 302	Song-hee
1995 (16th)	Kang Soo-yeon	Go Alone Like Musso's Horn	무소의 뿔처럼 혼자서 가라	Hye‑wan
1995 (16th)	Jung Sun-kyung	A Hot Roof	개같은 날의 오후	Jang Yun‑hee
1995 (16th)	Choi Jin-sil	How to Top My Wife	마누라 죽이기	Jang So-young
1996 (17th)	Shim Hye-jin ‡	The Adventures of Mrs. Park	박봉곤 가출사건	Park Bong-gon
1996 (17th)	Kang Soo-yeon	Their Last Love Affair	지독한 사랑	Young-hee
1996 (17th)	Lee Seung-yeon	Piano Man	피아노 맨	Detective Mi-ran
1996 (17th)	Jung Sun-kyung	Trio	3인조	Maria
1996 (17th)	Shim Eun-ha	Born to Kill	본 투 킬	Soo-ha
1997 (18th)	Shin Eun-kyung ‡	Downfall	창	Eun-young
1997 (18th)	Kang Soo-yeon	Deep Blue	깊은 슬픔	Oh Eun-seo
1997 (18th)	Shim Hye-jin	Green Fish	초록물고기	Mi-ae
1997 (18th)	Choi Jin-sil	Ghost Mamma	고스트 맘마	Cha In-ju
1997 (18th)	Jeon Do-yeon	The Contact	접속	Lee Soo-hyeon
1998 (19th)	Shim Eun-ha ‡	Christmas in August	8월의 크리스마스	Kim Da-rim
1998 (19th)	Shim Hye-jin	Bedroom And Courtroom	생과부 위자료 청구 소송	Lee Ki-ja
1998 (19th)	Lee Mi-sook	An Affair	정사	Seo-hyun
1998 (19th)	Jeon Do-yeon	A Promise	약속	Chae Hee-ju
1998 (19th)	Choi Jin-sil	The Letter	편지	Lee Jung-in
1999 (20th)	Jeon Do-yeon ‡	The Harmonium in My Memory	내 마음의 풍금	Yun Hong-yeon
1999 (20th)	Kang Soo-yeon	Rainbow Trout	송어	Jung-hwa
1999 (20th)	Ko So-young	Love	러브	Jenny
1999 (20th)	Shin Eun-kyung	The Ring Virus	링	Hong Sun-joo
1999 (20th)	Shim Eun-ha	Tell Me Something	텔 미 썸딩	Chae Soo-yeon

=== 2000s ===
Year	Winner	Film	Original title	Role(s)
2000 (21st)	Lee Mi-yeon ‡	Pisces	물고기자리	Ae-ryun
2000 (21st)	Kim Ha-neul	Ditto	동감	Yoon So-eun
2000 (21st)	Shim Eun-ha	Interview	인터뷰	Lee Young-hee
2000 (21st)	Lee Young-ae	Joint Security Area	공동경비구역 JSA	Maj. Sophie E. Jean
2000 (21st)	Jeon Do-yeon	Happy End	해피엔드	Choi Bo-ra
2001 (22nd)	Jang Jin-young ‡	Sorum	소름	Sun-yeong
2001 (22nd)	Kim Hee-sun	Wanee & Junah	와니와 준하	Wa-ni
2001 (22nd)	Lee Mi-yeon	Indian Summer	인디안 썸머	Lee Shin-young
2001 (22nd)	Lee Young-ae	One Fine Spring Day	봄날은 간다	Eun-soo
2001 (22nd)	Jeon Do-yeon	I Wish I Had a Wife	나도 아내가 있었으면 좋겠다	Jung Won-ju
2001 (22nd)	Jun Ji-hyun	My Sassy Girl	엽기적인 그녀	The Girl
2002 (23rd)	Kim Yoon-jin ‡	Ardor	밀애	Mi-heun
2002 (23rd)	Bae Doona	Sympathy for Mr. Vengeance	복수는 나의 것	Cha Yeong-mi
2002 (23rd)	Lee Mi-yeon	Addicted	중독	Heo Eun-soo
2002 (23rd)	Lee Eun-ju	Lovers' Concerto	연애소설	Kim Gyung-hee/Soo-in
2002 (23rd)	Jeon Do-yeon	No Blood No Tears	피도 눈물도 없이	Soo-jin
2002 (23rd)	Ha Ji-won	Phone	폰	Ji-won
2003 (24th)	Jang Jin-young ‡	Singles	싱글즈	Na-nan
2003 (24th)	Kim Sun-a	The Greatest Expectation	위대한 유산	Mi-young
2003 (24th)	Kim Ha-neul	My Tutor Friend	동갑내기 과외하기	Choi Su-wan
2003 (24th)	Moon So-ri	A Good Lawyer's Wife	바람난 가족	Eun Ho-jeong
2003 (24th)	Jeon Do-yeon	Untold Scandal	스캔들 - 조선남녀상열지사	Lady Jeong
2003 (24th)	Lee Mi-sook	Untold Scandal	스캔들 - 조선남녀상열지사	Lady Cho
2004 (25th)	Lee Na-young ‡	Someone Special	아는 여자	Han Yi-yeon
2004 (25th)	Kim Hye-soo	Hypnotized	얼굴없는 미녀	Ji-su
2004 (25th)	Lee Eun-ju	The Scarlet Letter	주홍글씨	Choi Ga-hee
2004 (25th)	Jeon Do-yeon	My Mother, the Mermaid	인어 공주	Na-young
2004 (25th)	Kim Ha-neul	Too Beautiful to Lie	그녀를 믿지 마세요	Joo Yeong-ju
2005 (26th)	Lee Young-ae ‡	Sympathy for Lady Vengeance	친절한 금자씨	Lee Geum-ja
2005 (26th)	Jeon Do-yeon	You Are My Sunshine	너는 내 운명	Jeon Eun-ha
2005 (26th)	Kang Hye-jung	Rules of Dating	연애의 목적	Choi Hong
2005 (26th)	Kim Jung-eun	Blossom Again	사랑니	Cho In-young
2005 (26th)	Son Ye-jin	April Snow	외출	Seo-young
2006 (27th)	Kim Hye-soo ‡	Tazza: The High Rollers	타짜	Madam Jeong
2006 (27th)	Choi Kang-hee	My Scary Girl	달콤, 살벌한 연인	Lee Mi-na
2006 (27th)	Im Soo-jung	Lump Sugar	각설탕	Kim Shi-eun
2006 (27th)	Jang Jin-young	Between Love and Hate	연애, 그 참을 수 없는 가벼움	Yeon-ah
2006 (27th)	Lee Na-young	Maundy Thursday	우리들의 행복한 시간	Moon Yu-jeong
2006 (27th)	Uhm Jung-hwa	For Horowitz	호로비츠를 위하여	Kim Ji-soo
2007 (28th)	Jeon Do-yeon ‡	Secret Sunshine	밀양	Lee Shin-ae
2007 (28th)	Im Soo-jung	Happiness	행복	Eun-hee
2007 (28th)	Kim Ah-joong	200 Pounds Beauty	미녀는 괴로워	Kang Han-na / Jenny
2007 (28th)	Lee Yo-won	May 18	화려한 휴가	Park Shin-ae
2007 (28th)	Song Hye-kyo	Hwang Jin-yi	황진이	Hwang Jin-yi
2008 (29th)	Son Ye-jin ‡	My Wife Got Married	아내가 결혼했다	Joo In-ah
2008 (29th)	Gong Hyo-jin	Crush and Blush	미쓰 홍당무	Yang Mi-sook
2008 (29th)	Kim Yoon-jin	Seven Days	세븐 데이즈	Yoo Ji-yeon
2008 (29th)	Moon So-ri	Forever the Moment	우리 생애 최고의 순간	Han Mi-sook
2008 (29th)	Soo Ae	Sunny	님은 먼곳에	Soon-yi / Sunny
2009 (30th)	Ha Ji-won ‡	Closer to Heaven	내 사랑 내 곁에	Lee Ji-soo
2009 (30th)	Choi Kang-hee	Goodbye Mom	애자	Park Ae-ja
2009 (30th)	Kim Ha-neul	My Girlfriend Is an Agent	7급 공무원	Ahn Soo-ji
2009 (30th)	Kim Hye-ja	Mother	마더	Mother
2009 (30th)	Kim Ok-vin	Thirst	박쥐	Tae-ju

=== 2010s ===
Year	Winner	Film	Original title	Role(s)
2010 (31st)	Yoon Jeong-hee ‡	Poetry	시	Yang Mi-ja
2010 (31st)	Soo Ae ‡	Midnight FM	심야의 FM	Ko Sun-young
2010 (31st)	Jeon Do-yeon	The Housemaid	하녀	Eun-yi
2010 (31st)	Kim Yoon-jin	Harmony	하모니	Hong Jeong-hye
2010 (31st)	Seo Young-hee	Bedevilled	김복남 살인사건의 전말	Kim Bok-nam
2011 (32nd)	Kim Ha-neul ‡	Blind	블라인드	Min Soo-ah
2011 (32nd)	Choi Kang-hee	Petty Romance	쩨쩨한 로맨스	Han Da-rim
2011 (32nd)	Jung Yu-mi	Silenced	도가니	Seo Yoo-jin
2011 (32nd)	Kim Hye-soo	Villain and Widow	이층의 악당	Hyun-joo
2011 (32nd)	Tang Wei	Late Autumn	만추	Anna
2012 (33rd)	Im Soo-jung ‡	All About My Wife	내 아내의 모든 것	Yeon Jung-in
2012 (33rd)	Gong Hyo-jin	Love Fiction	러브 픽션	Lee Hee-jin
2012 (33rd)	Jo Min-su	Pietà	피에타	Jang Mi-sun
2012 (33rd)	Kim Min-hee	Helpless	화차	Kang Seon-yeong/Cha Gyeong-seon
2012 (33rd)	Uhm Jung-hwa	Dancing Queen	댄싱퀸	Jung-hwa
2013 (34th)	Han Hyo-joo ‡	Cold Eyes	감시자들	Ha Yoon-joo
2013 (34th)	Kim Min-hee	Very Ordinary Couple	연애의 온도	Jang Young
2013 (34th)	Moon Jeong-hee	Hide and Seek	숨바꼭질	Joo-hee
2013 (34th)	Uhm Ji-won	Hope	소원	Kim Mi-hee
2013 (34th)	Uhm Jung-hwa	Montage	몽타주	Ha-kyung
2014 (35th)	Chun Woo-hee ‡	Han Gong-ju	한공주	Han Gong-ju
2014 (35th)	Jeon Do-yeon	Way Back Home	집으로 가는 길	Song Jeong-yeon
2014 (35th)	Kim Hee-ae	Thread of Lies	우아한 거짓말	Hyun-sook
2014 (35th)	Shim Eun-kyung	Miss Granny	수상한 그녀	Young Oh Mal-soon/ Oh Doo-ri
2014 (35th)	Son Ye-jin	Blood and Ties	공범	Jung Da-eun
2015 (36th)	Lee Jung-hyun ‡	Alice in Earnestland	성실한 나라의 앨리스	Jung Soo-nam
2015 (36th)	Han Hyo-joo	The Beauty Inside	뷰티 인사이드	Yi-soo
2015 (36th)	Jeon Do-yeon	The Shameless	무뢰한	Kim Hye-kyung
2015 (36th)	Jun Ji-hyun	Assassination	암살	Ahn Okyun / Mitsuko
2015 (36th)	Kim Hye-soo	Coin Locker Girl	차이나타운	Ma Woo-hee / Mother
2016 (37th)	Kim Min-hee ‡	The Handmaiden	아가씨	Lady/Izumi Hideko
2016 (37th)	Han Ye-ri	Worst Woman	최악의 하루	Eun-hee
2016 (37th)	Kim Hye-soo	Familyhood	굿바이 싱글	Go Joo-yeon
2016 (37th)	Son Ye-jin	The Last Princess	덕혜옹주	Princess Deokhye
2016 (37th)	Youn Yuh-jung	The Bacchus Lady	죽여주는 여자	So-young
2017 (38th)	Na Moon-hee ‡	I Can Speak	아이 캔 스피크	Na Ok-bun
2017 (38th)	Gong Hyo-jin	Missing	미씽: 사라진 여자	Han Mae / Kim Yeon
2017 (38th)	Kim Ok-vin	The Villainess	악녀	Sook-hee / Chae Yeon-soo
2017 (38th)	Moon So-ri	The Running Actress	여배우는 오늘도	Moon So-ri
2017 (38th)	Yum Jung-ah	The Mimic	장산범	Hee-yeon
2018 (39th)	Han Ji-min ‡	Miss Baek	미쓰백	Baek Sang-ah
2018 (39th)	Esom	Microhabitat	소공녀	Miso
2018 (39th)	Kim Hee-ae	Herstory	허스토리	Moon Jung-sook
2018 (39th)	Kim Tae-ri	Little Forest	리틀 포레스트	Song Hye-won
2018 (39th)	Park Bo-young	On Your Wedding Day	너의 결혼식	Hwan Seung-hee
2019 (40th)	Cho Yeo-jeong ‡	Parasite	기생충	Choi Yeon-gyo
2019 (40th)	Go Ah-sung	A Resistance	항거:유관순 이야기	Yu Gwan-sun
2019 (40th)	Kim Hye-soo	Default	국가부도의 날	Han Shi-hyeon
2019 (40th)	Lim Yoona	Exit	엑시트	Jung Eui-joo
2019 (40th)	Jeon Do-yeon	Birthday	생일	Park Soon-nam

=== 2020s ===
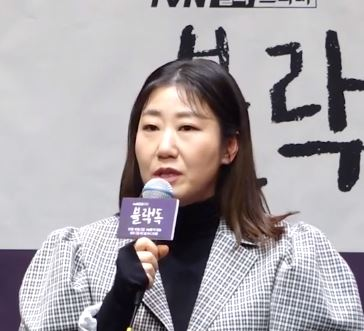
Ra Mi-ran won for her role in Honest Candidate

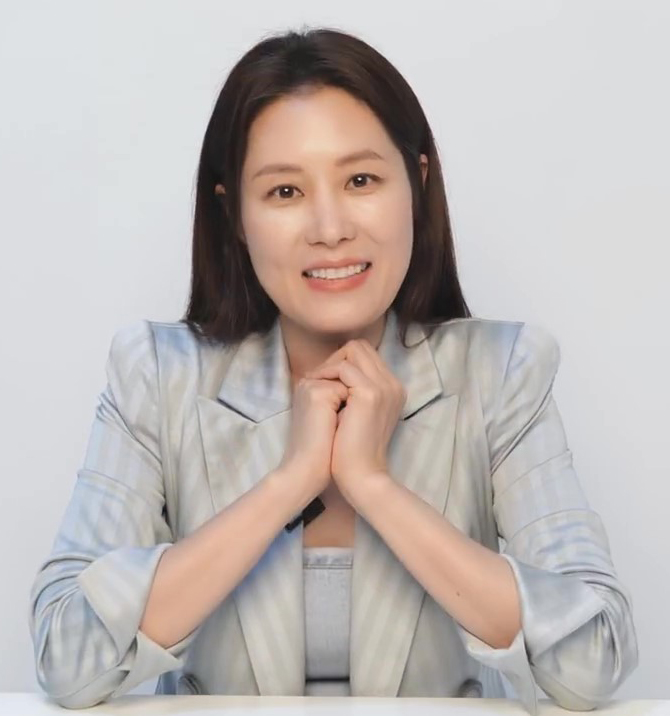
Moon So-ri won for her role in Three Sisters

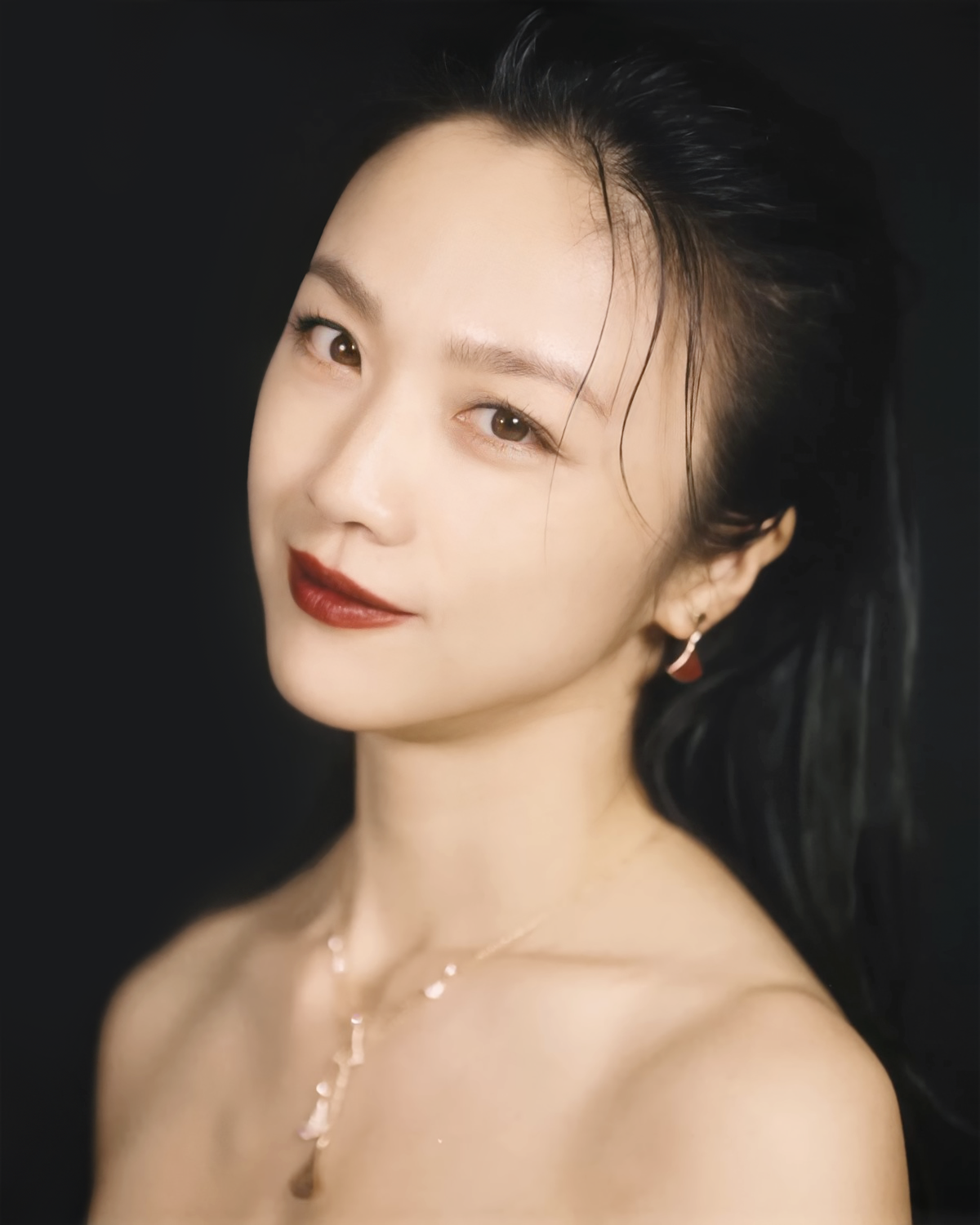
Tang Wei won for her role in Decision to Leave

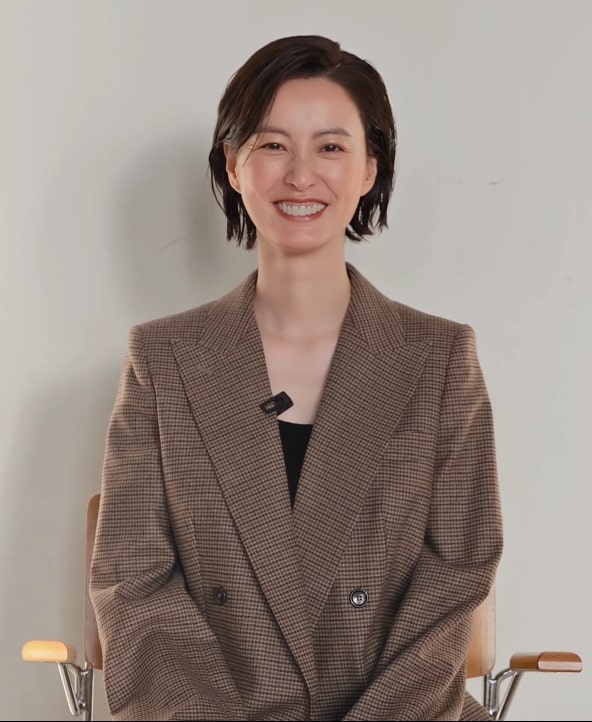
Jung Yu-mi won for her role in Sleep

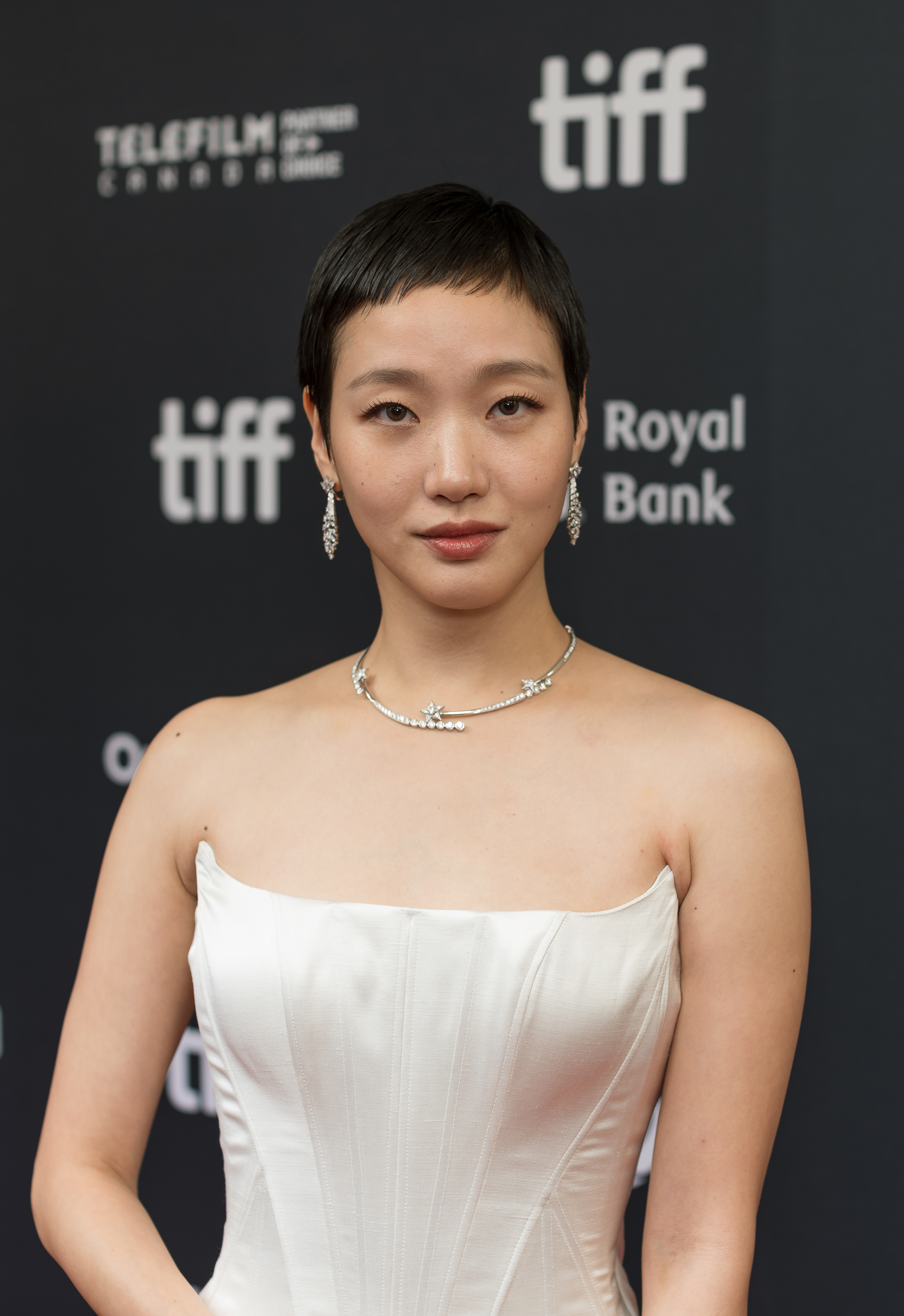
Kim Go-eun won for her role in Exhuma

Year	Winner	Film	Original title	Role(s)
2020 (41st)	Ra Mi-ran	Honest Candidate	정직한 후보	Joo Sang-sook
2020 (41st)	Kim Hee-ae	Moonlit Winter	윤희에게	Yoon-hee
2020 (41st)	Shin Min-a	Diva	디바	Lee Young
2020 (41st)	Jeon Do-yeon	Beasts Clawing at Straws	지푸라기라도 잡고 싶은 짐승들	Choi Yeon-hee
2020 (41st)	Jung Yu-mi	Kim Ji-young: Born 1982	82년생 김지영	Kim Ji-young
2021 (42nd)	Moon So-ri	Three Sisters	세 자매	Mi-yeon
2021 (42nd)	Jeon Jong-seo	The Call	콜	Oh Young-sook
2021 (42nd)	Jeon Yeo-been	Night in Paradise	낙원의 밤	Kim Jae-yeon
2021 (42nd)	Lim Yoona	Miracle: Letters to the President	기적	Song Ra-hee
2021 (42nd)	Kim Hye-soo	The Day I Died: Unclosed Case	내가 죽던 날	Kim Hyeon-soo
2022 (43rd)	Tang Wei	Decision to Leave	헤어질 결심	Song Seo-rae
2022 (43rd)	Yum Jung-ah	Life Is Beautiful	인생은 아름다워	Oh Se-yeon
2022 (43rd)	Lim Yoona	Confidential Assignment 2: International	공조2: 인터내셔날	Park Min-young
2022 (43rd)	Chun Woo-hee	Anchor	앵커	Jung Se-ra
2022 (43rd)	Park So-dam	Special Delivery	특송	Jang Eun-ha
2023 (44th)
2023 (44th)	Jung Yu-mi‡	Sleep	잠	Soo-jin
2023 (44th)	Kim Seo-hyung	Green House	비닐하우스	Mun-jeong
2023 (44th)	Kim Hye-soo	Smugglers	밀수	Jo Chun-ja
2023 (44th)	Park Bo-young	Concrete Utopia	콘크리트 유토피아	Myeong-hwa
2023 (44th)	Yum Jung-ah	Smugglers	밀수	Um Jin-sook
2024 (45th)
2024 (45th)	Kim Go-eun‡	Exhuma	파묘	Lee Hwa-rim
2024 (45th)	Go Ah-sung	Because I Hate Korea	한국이 싫어서	Gye-na
2024 (45th)	Ra Mi-ran	Citizen of a Kind	시민덕희	Kim Deok-hee
2024 (45th)	Jeon Do-yeon	Revolver	리볼버	Ha Soo-young
2024 (45th)	Tang Wei	Wonderland	원더랜드	Bai Li
2025 (46th)
2025 (46th)	Son Ye-jin‡	No Other Choice	어쩔수가없다	Lee Mi-ri
2025 (46th)	Song Hye-kyo	Dark Nuns	검은 수녀들	Sister Junia
2025 (46th)	Lee Jae-in	Hi-Five	하이파이브	Park Wan-seo
2025 (46th)	Lee Hye-young	The Old Woman with the Knife	파과	Hornclaw
2025 (46th)	Lim Yoona	Pretty Crazy	악마가 이사왔다	Jeong Seon-ji

== Multiple wins and nominations ==
The following individuals received two or more Best Actress awards:

Wins	Actress
3	Kim Hye-soo
3	Yoon Jeong-hee
2	Moon Jung-suk
2	Jang Jin-young
2	Jeon Do-yeon
2	Son Ye-jin

The following individuals received four or more Best Actress nominations:

Nominations	Actress
17	Jeon Do-yeon
10	Kim Hye-soo
8	Kang Soo-yeon
6	Choi Jin-sil
5	Kim Ha-neul
5	Son Ye-jin
4	Lim Yoona
4	Kim Hee-ae
4	Moon So-ri
4	Shim Eun-ha
4	Shim Hye-jin
3	Im Soo-jung
3	Jung Yu-mi
3	Tang Wei

== Superlatives ==
Record	Actress		
Actress with most awards	Kim Hye-soo	—N/a	3
Actress with most awards	Yoon Jeong-hee	—N/a	3
Actress with most nominations	Jeon Do-yeon	—N/a	16
Actress with most nominations without ever winning	Choi Jin-sil	—N/a	6
First foreign actress won	Tang Wei	Decision to Leave	—N/a
Oldest winner	Na Moon-hee	I Can Speak	75
Oldest nominee	Na Moon-hee	I Can Speak	75
Youngest winner	Kim Hye-soo	First Love	23
Youngest nominee	Jun Ji-hyun	My Sassy Girl	21

== General references ==
- "Winners and nominees lists". Blue Dragon Film Awards (in Korean). Archived from the original on 27 January 2022.
- "Blue Dragon Film Awards". Naver (in Korean).
