= My Wife Got Married =

- Theatrical release poster
- Hangul: 아내가 결혼했다
- Hanja: 아내가 結婚했다
- RR: Anaega gyeolhonhaetda
- MR: Anaega kyŏrhonhaetta
- Directed by: Jeong Yoon-soo
- Written by: Song Hye-jin
- Based on: My Wife Got Married by Park Hyun-wook
- Produced by: Ju Pil-ho; Cho Chul-hyun; Lee Sang-yong
- Starring: Kim Joo-hyuk; Son Ye-jin
- Cinematography: Kim Tae-sung
- Edited by: Steve M. Choe
- Music by: Hong Sung-kyu
- Distributed by: CJ Entertainment
- Release date: October 23, 2008 (South Korea)
- Running time: 119 minutes
- Country: South Korea
- Language: Korean
- Box office: US$10.6 million

My Wife Got Married (Korean: 아내가 결혼했다; RR: Anaega gyeolhonhaetda) is a 2008 South Korean romantic comedy film. Directed by Jeong Yoon-soo and starring Kim Joo-hyuk and Son Ye-jin in the lead roles, the film is adapted from a bestselling novel of the same name by Park Hyun-wook.

== Plot ==
Deok-hoon meets In-ah, a former colleague, on the subway; the two turn out to be big soccer fans, and soon begin a passionate relationship. To quell his doubts about In-ah's fidelity, Deok-hoon proposes to her, and they get married. But their honeymoon period doesn't last long, as In-ah declares that she will marry another man.

== Cast ==
- Kim Joo-hyuk as Noh Deok-hoon
- Son Ye-jin as Joo In-ah
- Joo Sang-wook as Han Jae-kyung
- Kim Byung-choon as Boo-jang
- Chun Sung-hoon as Kim Jin-ho
- Oh Yeon-ah as So-young
- Son Hee-soon as Jae-kyung's mother
- Hong Hyun-chul as Jae-kyung's father
- Kwon Sung-min as Sung-min
- Choi Won-hong as Joon-seo
- Jung Se-hyung as doctor Choi Yeon-Woong
- Oh Jung-se as Byung-soo
- Kim Ok-kyung as guardian
- Ban Hye-ra as guardian
- Hong Won-bae as radio DJ
- Lee Joo-sil as Deok-hoon's mother (cameo)
- Yang Jung-a as Noh Deok-joo (cameo)

== Release ==
My Wife Got Married was released in South Korea on October 23, 2008. It topped the box office on its opening weekend, selling 515,464 tickets. As of November 9, 2008, the film had sold a total of 1,818,497 admissions nationwide and ranked 10th among the top grossing domestic films of 2008.

== Awards and nominations ==
Award	Category	Nominated work	Result	Ref.
4th University Film Festival of Korea	Best Actress	Son Ye-jin	Won	
7th Korean Film Awards	Best Actress	Son Ye-jin	Nominated	
7th Korean Film Awards	Best Screenplay	Song Hye-jin	Nominated	
29th Blue Dragon Film Awards	Best Leading Actor	Kim Joo-hyuk	Nominated	
29th Blue Dragon Film Awards	Best Leading Actress	Son Ye-jin	Won	
29th Blue Dragon Film Awards	Best Screenplay	Song Hye-jin	Nominated	
29th Blue Dragon Film Awards	Popular Star Award	Son Ye-jin	Won	
29th Blue Dragon Film Awards	Best Couple Award	Son Ye-jin and Kim Joo-hyuk	Won	
45th Baeksang Arts Awards	Best Actor	Kim Joo-hyuk	Nominated	
45th Baeksang Arts Awards	Best Actress	Son Ye-jin	Won	
18th Buil Film Awards	Best Actress	Son Ye-jin	Nominated	
11th Asian Film Critics Association Awards	Best Actress	Son Ye-jin	Nominated	
