= The Art of Seduction (film) =

2005 South Korean romantic comedy film

- Theatrical release poster
- Hangul: 작업의 정석
- Hanja: 作業의 定石
- RR: Jageobui jeongseok
- MR: Chagŏbŭi chŏngsŏk
- Directed by: Oh Ki-hwan
- Written by: Sin Jeong-goo
- Produced by: Choe Yong-bae
- Starring: Son Ye-jin; Song Il-kook
- Cinematography: Lee Suck-hyun
- Edited by: Kim Sun-min
- Music by: Kim Jun-seok
- Production company: Chungeorahm Film
- Distributed by: Showbox
- Release date: 21 December 2005
- Running time: 100 minutes
- Country: South Korea
- Language: Korean
- Box office: US$14.2 million

The Art of Seduction (Korean: 작업의 정석; RR: Jageobui jeongseok; lit. 'The Standards of Work') is a 2005 South Korean romantic comedy film directed by Oh Ki-hwan, and starring Son Ye-jin and Song Il-kook. It was released on 21 December 2005.

== Plot ==
Min-jun (Song Il-kook) and Ji-won (Son Ye-jin) are so-called the first-rate "players" who are dating gurus with 100% success rates in any dating pursuits. Following her usual systematic dating rules, Ji-won fakes a schematic car accident to capture Min-jun's attention and successfully approaches him.

However, her smooth-sailing dating life finally encounters turbulence. Why in the world is this guy not succumbing to her alluring charm? Min-jun is also overwhelmed by the understanding that he has met his match. However, like the veteran players that they are, these two shouldn't show any signs of weakness in their dating tactics. Who will emerge victorious and become the last player standing?

== Cast ==
- Son Ye-jin as Han Ji-won
- Song Il-kook as Seo Min-jun
- Roh Joo-hyun as Min-jun's father
- Hyun Young as Ji-won's friend
- Park Jun-gyu as CEO Bong
- Ahn Sang-tae as Fortune teller
- Yoon Yeong-joon as No Do-cheul
- Ahn Sun-young as Oh Ji-yeong
- Kim Ae-kyung as Park Yeo-sa
- Woo Hyun as guard / pawnshop owner
