= Jeong Yoon-soo =

South Korean film director (born 1971)

Jeong Yoon-soo (Korean: 정윤수; born October 23, 1962) is a South Korean film director.

== Filmography ==
As director:

- Love, In Between (2010)
- My Wife Got Married (2008)
- Love Now (2007)
- Yesterday (2002)
