= April Snow =

2005 South Korean romantic drama film

- Theatrical release poster
- Hangul: 외출
- Hanja: 外出
- RR: Oechul
- MR: Oech'ul
- Directed by: Hur Jin-ho
- Written by: Shin Joon-ho; Lee Won-sik; Seo Yu-min; Lee Il; Hur Jin-ho
- Produced by: Bae Yong-guk
- Starring: Bae Yong-joon; Son Ye-jin
- Cinematography: Lee Mo-gae
- Edited by: Lee Eun-su
- Music by: Jo Seong-woo
- Production companies: Blue Storm Co., Ltd.
- Distributed by: Show East
- Release date: 8 September 2005
- Running time: 105 minutes
- Country: South Korea
- Language: Korean
- Box office: US$24.9 million

April Snow (Korean: 외출; RR: oechul; lit. 'Outing') is a 2005 South Korean romantic drama film co-written and directed by Hur Jin-ho. It stars Bae Yong-joon and Son Ye-jin as two strangers who discover their comatose spouses were having an affair and, while caring for them, unexpectedly fall in love themselves. The film was released in South Korea on September 8, 2005.

== Plot ==
Lighting technician In-su travels from Seoul to Samcheok after learning that his wife, Su-jin, has been seriously injured in a traffic accident. At the hospital he meets Seo-young, whose husband, Kyung-ho, was in the same car when the accident occurred. While both spouses remain comatose following surgery, In-su and Seo-young stay at the same motel near the hospital as they wait for news of their recoveries.

As police return the couple's personal belongings, Seo-young discovers evidence that Su-jin and Kyung-ho had been engaged in an extramarital affair. Among the recovered items are Su-jin's camcorder, containing footage of the lovers together, and messages on their mobile phones confirming their relationship. Shocked, Seo-young gives the camera to In-su, forcing him to confront his wife's betrayal.

United by their shared grief, In-su and Seo-young begin spending more time together in the hospital and at the motel. They speculate about how the affair began and struggle to reconcile the people they believed they knew with the secret lives their spouses had been leading. At first, both are consumed by bitterness, with In-su even wishing that his adulterous wife had died. As the weeks pass, In-su and Seo-young grow emotionally dependent on one another. Their companionship develops into a romantic relationship, and they eventually become lovers themselves, finding that they have entered the same moral situation as the spouses whose infidelity had brought them together.

The relationship is interrupted when the hospital informs In-su that Su-jin has regained consciousness, while Kyung-ho dies from his injuries. Su-jin expresses regret for her affair, leaving In-su conflicted between his responsibility to his recovering wife and his feelings for Seo-young. Realizing their relationship cannot continue as it has, Seo-young quietly leaves without saying goodbye, determined to begin a new life on her own.

Some time later, In-su divorces Su-jin and resumes his work. Returning to his apartment after the separation, he reflects on everything that has happened. While dismantling the stage after an outdoor concert, he notices an unseasonable spring snowfall and remembers a conversation he once shared with Seo-young. Elsewhere, Seo-young also watches the snow falling outside her window. The two reunite and drive together into the countryside to watch the snowfall.

== Cast ==
- Bae Yong-joon as In-su
- Son Ye-jin as Seo-young
- Im Sang-hyo as Kang Su-jin
- Kim Kwang-il as Kwang-il
- Jeon Guk-hwan as Su-jin's father
- Yoo Seung-mok as Doctor
- Kim Se-dong as Insurance company employee
- Chun Dae-byung as Policeman
- Ryu Seung-soo as Yoon Kyung-ho
- Lee Young-hee as Kyung-ho's mother
- Leessang as themselves
- Loveholic as themselves
- Clazziquai Project as themselves

== Production ==
Filming began on February 4, 2005 in the seaside town of Samcheok, Gangwon Province.

A four-hour live concert was held on April 24, 2005 at the open-air theater in Yonsei University; some scenes were included in the film.

April Snow wrapped shooting on June 18, 2005 in Gwangju, Gyeonggi Province.

== Reception ==
The film grossed US$2,707,442 in South Korea on 809,191 admissions.

April Snow was also released in 10 other Asian countries. Due mainly to actor Bae Yong-joon's Korean Wave popularity, it became a box office success in Japan, Philippines and China. It became the highest-grossing Korean film in Japan, grossing ¥2.72 billion or US$24.2 million (this record would later be broken by another Son Ye-jin film, A Moment to Remember with ¥2.75 billion).

A director's cut with 30 minutes extra footage was released in Japan in 2006, which also did well commercially.

Son Ye-jin received a Best Actress nomination at the 2005 Blue Dragon Film Awards.

== Awards and nominations ==
Award	Category	Recipients	Result
Chicago International Film Festival	Best Feature	April Snow	Nominated
San Sebastián International Film Festival	Golden Seashell	Hur Jin-ho	Nominated
26th Blue Dragon Film Awards	Best Leading Actress	Son Ye-jin	Nominated
13th Chunsa Film Art Awards	Best Actress	Son Ye-jin	Nominated
51st Asia Pacific Film Festival	Best Actress	Son Ye-jin	Won
