= Park Hyun-wook =

South Korean writer (born 1967)

Park Hyun-wook (Korean: 박현욱; born 1967) is a South Korean writer.

== Life ==
Park Hyun-wook was born in Seoul, South Korea in 1967. He studied sociology at Yonsei University. He made his literary debut in 2001 when his novel Dongjeong eopneun sesang (동정 없는 세상 A World Without Virginity) won the Munhakdongne Writer Award. He also wrote the short story collection Geu yeojaui chimdae (그 여자의 침대 The Woman's Bed) and the novels Anaega gyeolhonhetda (아내가 결혼했다 My Wife Got Married) and Saenuen (새는 Birds Are). Anaega received the 2nd World Literature Award.

== Writing ==
Park Hyun-wook’s stories typically concern romantic relationships between men and women. His debut novel Dongjeong eopneun sesang (동정 없는 세상 A World Without Virginity) is about a virgin teenager named Junho who is set on having sex with his girlfriend Seoyoung. He obsesses over losing his virginity because he doesn’t know how else to become an adult. Despite the fact that the novel opens and ends with the suggestive line “I want to do it with you,” its focus is not on sex but on growing up. The novel makes the counter-intuitive observation that growing up entails leaving the world of adults. Dongjeong has been adapted into a TV series.

Anaega gyeolhonhetda (아내가 결혼했다 My Wife Got Married) was widely discussed when it came out in 2006 due to its plot: the narrator’s wife marries another man and starts a polygamous marriage. Anaega has been adapted into a film.

== Works ==
- 그 여자의 침대 (The Woman's Bed, 2008)
- 아내가 결혼했다 (My Wife Got Married, 2006)
- 새는 (Birds Are, 2003)
- 동정 없는 세상 (A World Without Virginity, 2001)

=== Works in translation ===
- Comment ma femme s'est mariée (French)

== Awards ==
- 2006: World Literature Award.
- 2001: Munhakdongne Writer Award
