= Son Ye-jin =

South Korean actress (born 1982)

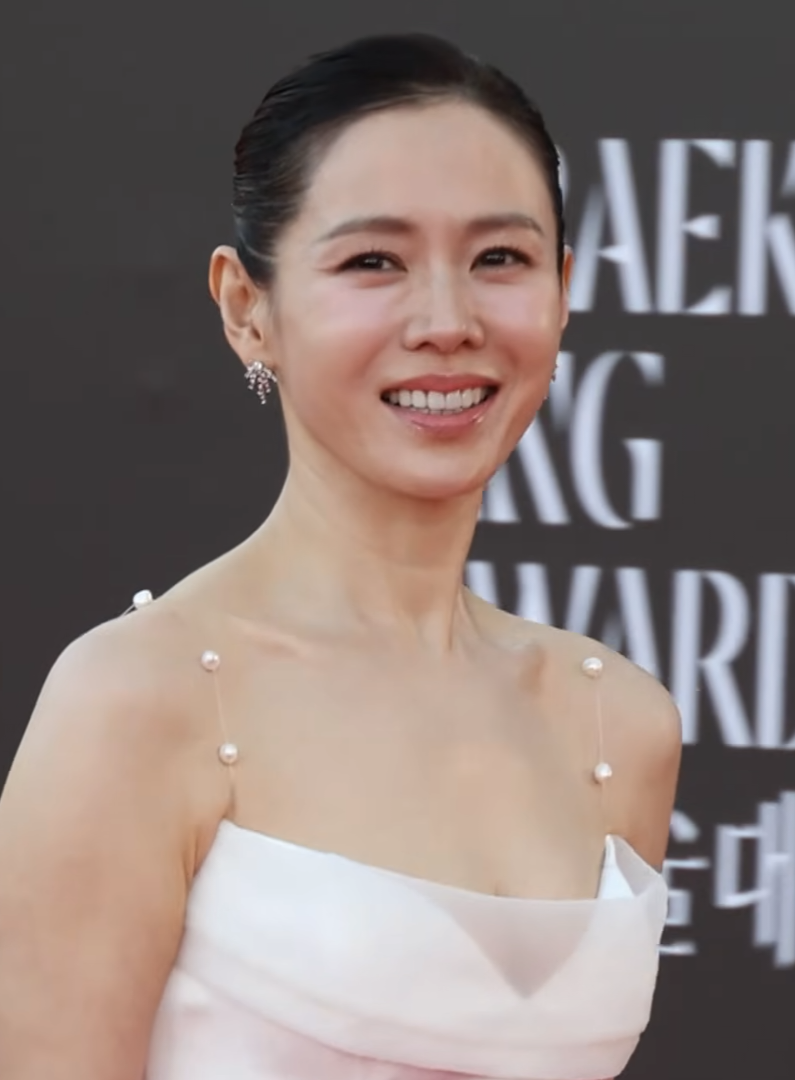
- Son in May 2026
- Born: Son Eon-jin; January 11, 1982 (age 44); Daegu, South Korea
- Occupation: Actress
- Years active: 2000–present
- Agent: MSTeam Entertainment
- Height: 165 cm (5 ft 5 in)
- Spouse: Hyun Bin (m. 2022)
- Children: 1
- Awards: Full list

Korean name
- Hangul: 손언진
- Hanja: 孫彦眞
- RR: Son Eonjin
- MR: Son Ŏnjin

Stage name
- Hangul: 손예진
- Hanja: 孫藝珍
- RR: Son Yejin
- MR: Son Yejin
- Website: msteam.co.kr

Signature
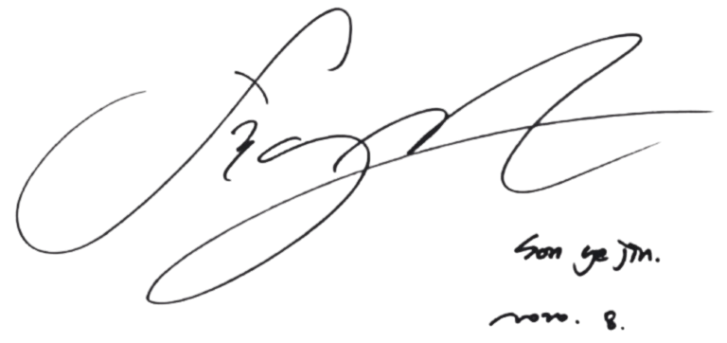

Son Eon-jin (Korean: 손언진; born January 11, 1982), better known by her stage name, Son Ye-jin (손예진), is a South Korean actress who rose to fame in 2003 in The Classic and Summer Scent, which were followed by the commercially successful A Moment to Remember (2004) and April Snow (2005). Her early romantic roles garnered her the title "Nation's First Love" in Korea.

Son has since won accolades and starred in other high-profile films, including My Wife Got Married (2008), Spellbound (2011), The Tower (2012), The Pirates (2014), The Last Princess (2016), Be with You (2018), and Park Chan-wook's The Truth Beneath (2016) and No Other Choice (2025). She has also acted in popular television dramas, such as Alone in Love (2006), Something in the Rain (2018), and Crash Landing on You (2019–2020). From 2019 to 2022, she appeared on Forbes Korea Power Celebrity 40 for four consecutive years.

== Career ==
=== 2000–2005: Beginnings and East Asia stardom ===
Son Ye-jin was the voice of Jung Mi-jo in Park Ki-hyung's film Secret Tears in 2000, and then took leading roles in television dramas such as Delicious Proposal, Sun-hee and Jin-hee, and Great Ambition. Her first high-profile role in cinema was in Im Kwon-taek's Chi-hwa-seon, which screened at Cannes and took home a Best Director award in 2002.

The biggest successes of her early career were in the films Lovers' Concerto and The Classic. Both were films mid-level hits in Korea, and The Classic in particular — being a work of My Sassy Girl director Kwak Jae-yong — received wide exposure in Hong Kong and mainland China, and launched Son's East Asia stardom. Son further solidified her status as a Hallyu (Korean Wave) star in 2003 by taking the lead in TV drama Summer Scent, the third installment of the season-themed tetralogy Endless Love directed by Yoon Seok-ho.

Her next films also gained wide popularity in East Asia, particularly in Japan: A Moment to Remember, based on a famous Japanese series, set box office records in Japan and sold over two million tickets in Korea, and April Snow, in which she co-starred with superstar Bae Yong-joon, which was also a hit in Japan and China. Son, who assumed a pure and innocent image in her films The Classic and A Moment to Remember, was given the title of the "Nation's First Love" in Korea.

In 2006, Son became the highest-paid Korean actress in Korean television series when she was guaranteed a talent fee of KRW 50 million (plus incentives) per episode for her lead role in the SBS drama Alone in Love.

=== 2006–2015: Film roles and genre expansion ===
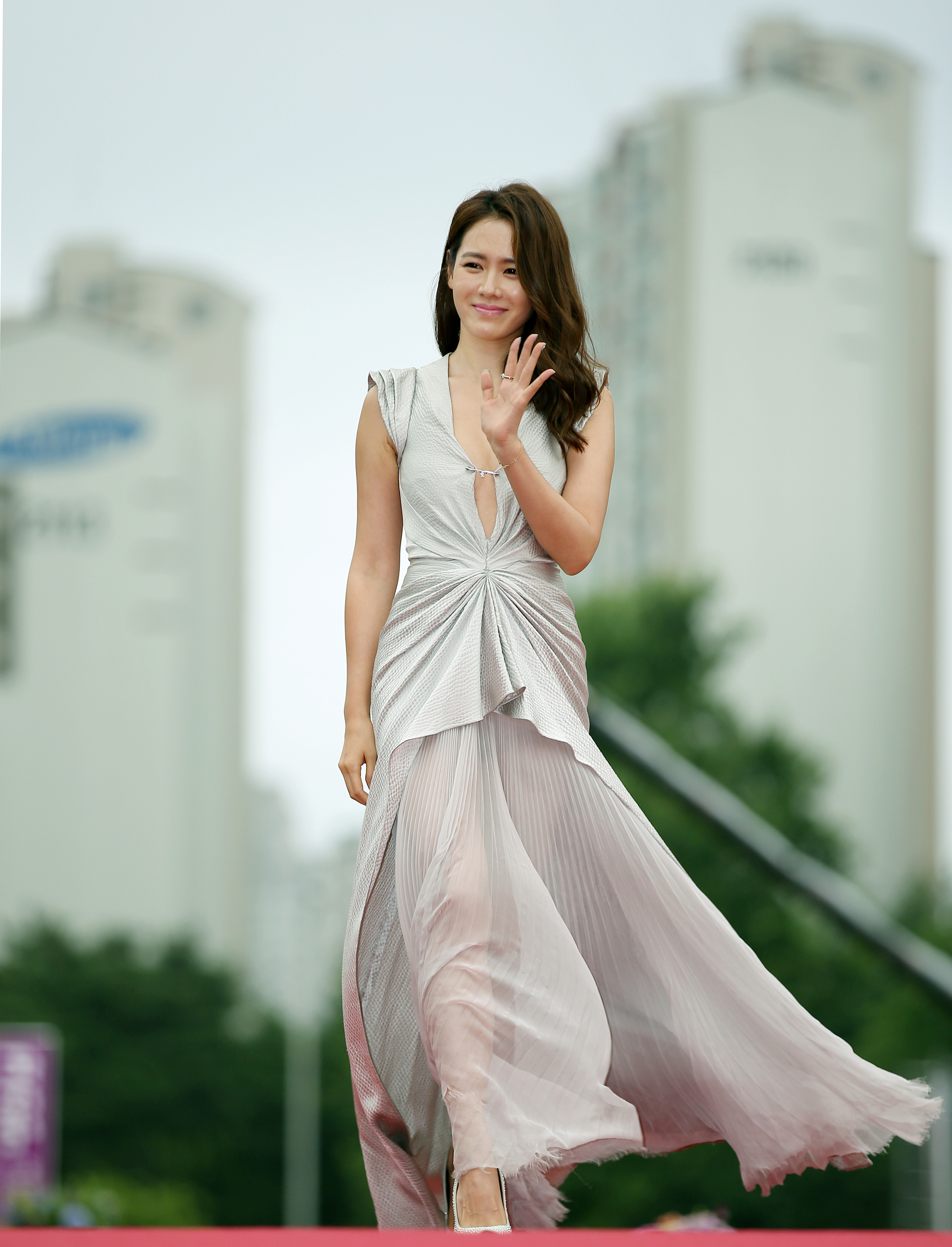
Son during 2014 Bucheon International Fantastic Film Festival

Son cast off her nice girl image in her next projects. She played a con artist in The Art of Seduction, an ambitious reporter in Spotlight, a femme fatale in Open City, and a divorcée in the critically acclaimed series Alone in Love. In 2008, her portrayal of a polyandrous woman in My Wife Got Married won her Best Actress honors from the prestigious Blue Dragon Film Awards and other local bodies.

After filming the dark mystery White Night, Son acted in the romantic comedy series Personal Taste, followed by the horror-romantic comedy film Spellbound, which became one of the top-grossing films in 2011, and by far the most successful Korean romantic comedy movie in recent years.

In 2012, Son starred in her first blockbuster, The Tower, a remake of the 1974 Hollywood disaster film The Towering Inferno. She returned to television in 2013 in the revenge drama Shark, then headlined Blood and Ties, a thriller about a daughter who suspects that her father was involved in a kidnapping-murder case.

Son reunited with Shark co-star Kim Nam-gil in the 2014 period adventure film The Pirates, which received mixed reviews but was a commercial hit with more than 8.6 million admissions at the end of its theatre run, and which won Son the Best Actress award at the Grand Bell Awards. The Pirates was one of the highest-grossing Korean films of all time, along with other Son Ye Jin's movies, The Tower and The Last Princess. Son next starred in the black comedy Bad Guys Always Die opposite Taiwanese actor Chen Bolin, a Chinese-Korean co-production that was filmed on Jeju Island.

=== 2016–2018: Critical acclaim ===
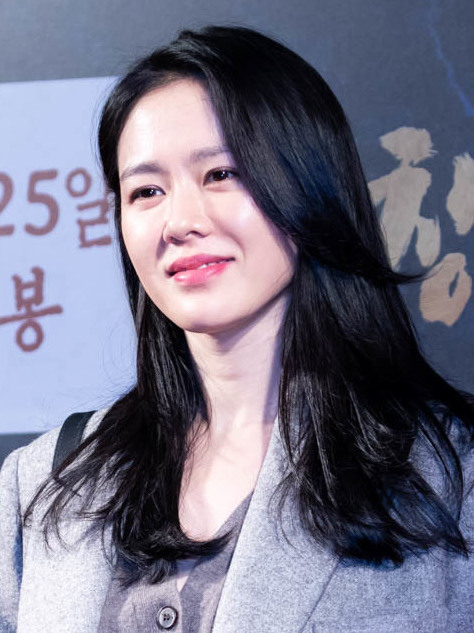
Son in 2018

In 2016, Son reunited with My Wife Got Married co-star Kim Joo-hyuk in The Truth Beneath, a political thriller, for which she received critical acclaim. She won Best Actress at the 25th Buil Film Awards and 17th Busan Film Critics Awards for her performance. Son next played Princess Deokhye in the biopic The Last Princess, directed by April Snow director Hur Jin-ho. The film drew positive critical reviews and went on to become a box office hit, grossing US$40.35 million worldwide. Sung So-young of the Korea JoongAng Daily praised the film for being "interesting enough to hold the audience's interest from beginning to end," even though she felt the screenwriter's (Hur) imagination went too far in several scenes. She said major events from Princess Deokhye's life were portrayed well, and the film's biggest virtue was how it made audiences want to know more about her. Rumy Doo of The Korea Herald said Son Ye-jin proved herself a "sensitive and technically refined performer." Son was praised by critics for her "outstanding" performance in her portrayal of "the unfathomable depths on the emotional ups and downs of Deokhye," winning multiple accolades for her performance.

In 2018, Son starred alongside So Ji-sub in the romantic film Be with You, based on the Japanese novel of the same name. That same year, Son returned to the small screen after five years with JTBC's romantic drama Something in the Rain. The series achieved commercial popularity, and Son received rave reviews for her performance. Son also starred in the crime thriller The Negotiation, alongside Hyun Bin, playing a professional negotiator working to save hostages.

=== 2019–present: International success ===
In 2019, Son reunited with Hyun Bin in the global hit romantic drama Crash Landing on You as a wealthy heiress who falls in love with a North Korean commissioned officer. Son was scheduled to have her Hollywood debut in 2022, starring opposite Sam Worthington in filmmaker Andrew Niccol's work The Cross, but due to the COVID-19 pandemic, her agency requested a delay in filming. In 2025, Son starred in Park Chan-wook's No Other Choice. The film garnered critical acclaim.

== Philanthropy ==
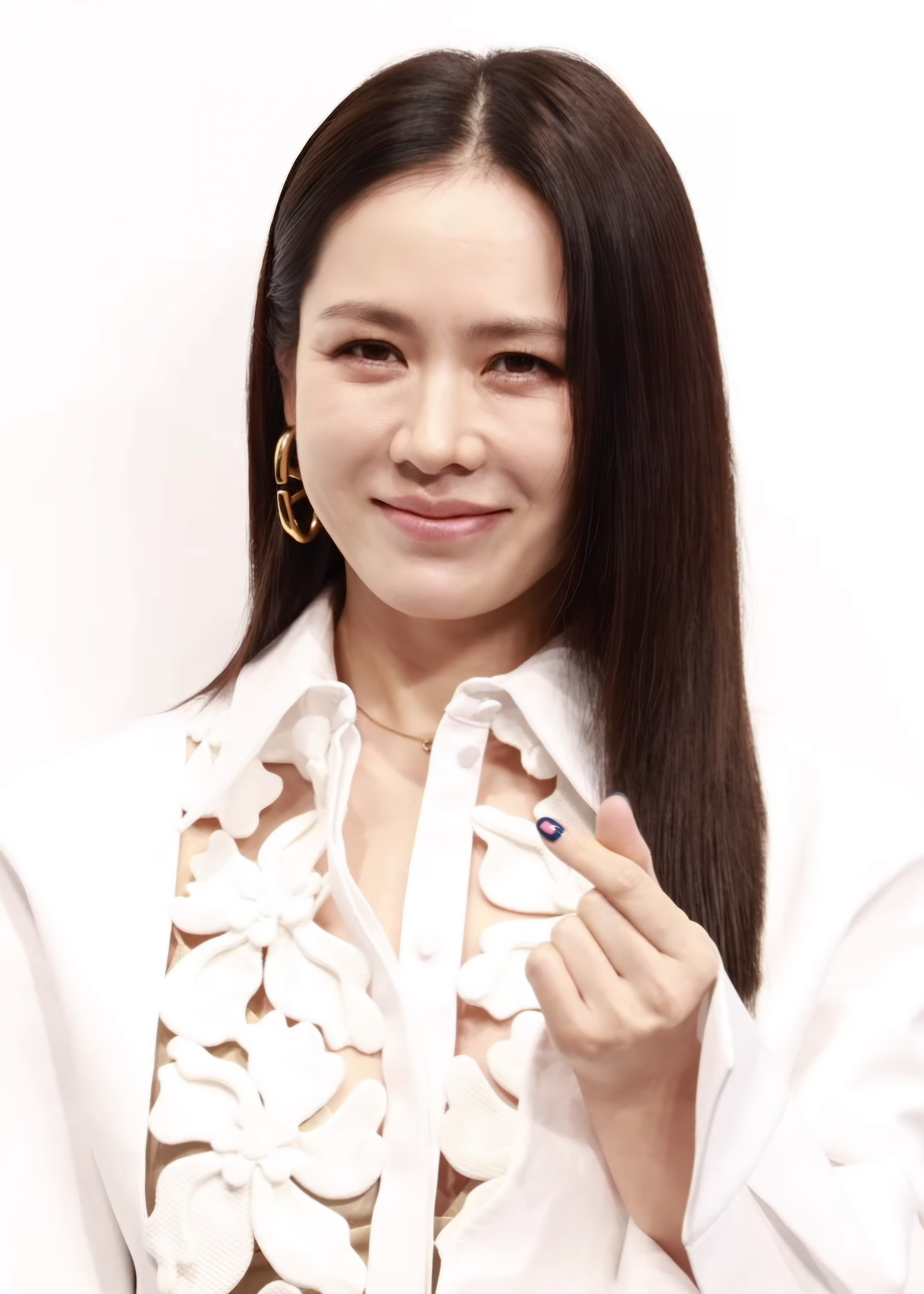
Son in 2024

On February 27, 2020, Son donated ₩100 million to Community Chest of Korea in Daegu to help fight the spread of COVID-19. Daegu is Son's hometown. On March 8, 2022, Son and Hyun Bin donated ₩200 million to the Hope Bridge Disaster Relief Association to help those affected by the massive wildfire of Uljin forest fire 2022, which devastated the area and then spread to Samcheok, Gangwon Province, South Korea. At end of 2025, Son and Hyun Bin also donated ₩200 million to Samsung Medical Center.

== Personal life ==
Son is a Roman Catholic and her baptismal name is Dominica.

=== Relationship and marriage ===
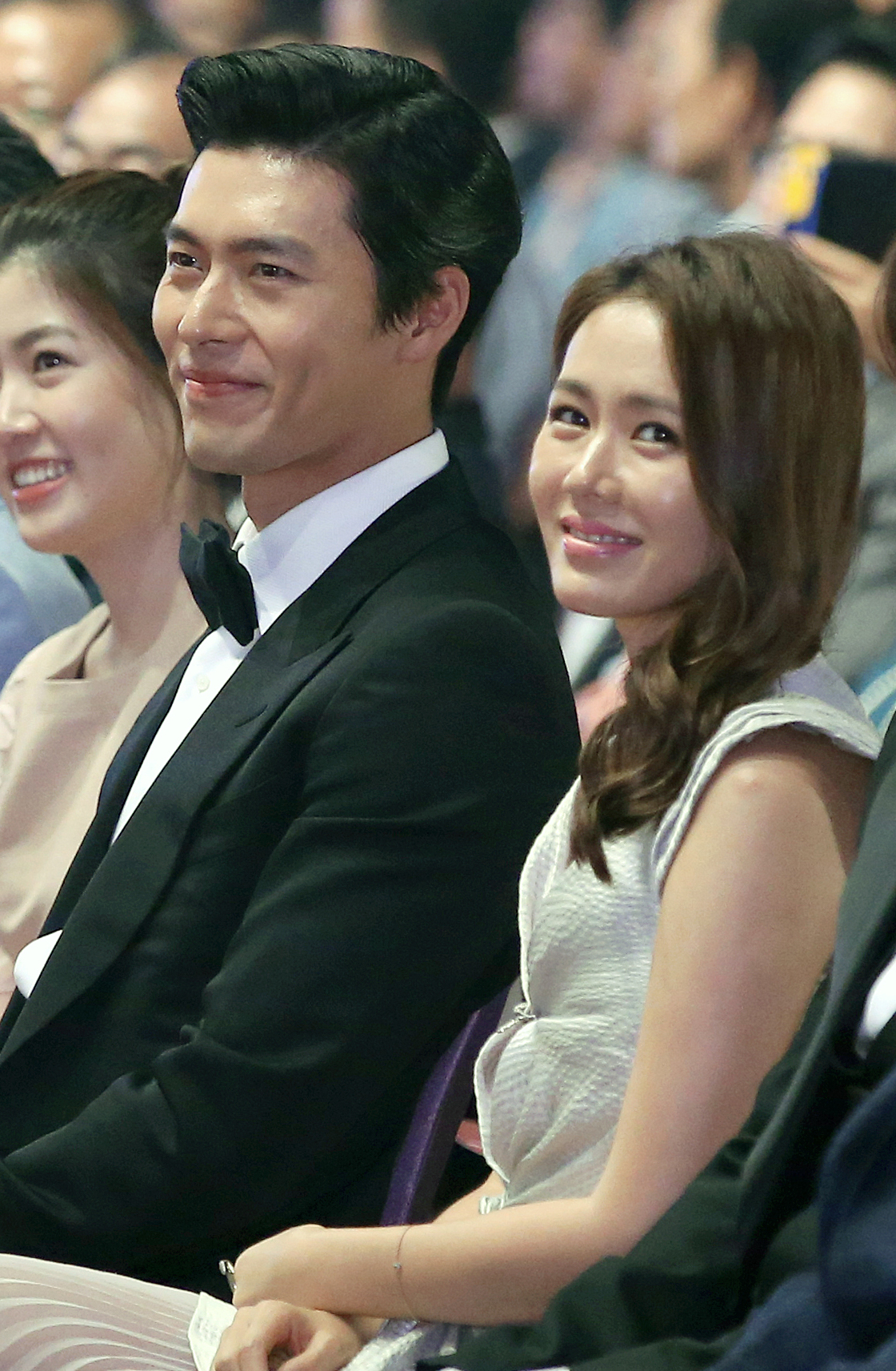
Son with Hyun Bin at the 2014 Bucheon International Fantastic Film Festival

On January 1, 2021, it was confirmed that Son had been in a relationship with actor Hyun Bin, her co-star in The Negotiation (2018) and Crash Landing on You (2019–2020), since the prior year, after Crash Landing on You had concluded.

On February 10, 2022, Son and Hyun Bin announced their engagement in letters posted on their social media accounts. They married in a private ceremony on March 31, 2022, attended by their parents and friends of both families. On June 27, 2022, Son announced that she was pregnant with the couple's first child; she gave birth to a son, named Kim Woo-Jin, on November 27, 2022.

== Filmography ==
Key
†	Denotes films that have not yet been released

=== Film ===
List of film appearances
Year	Title	Role	Note	Ref.
2000	Secret Tears	Jung Mi-jo	Voice	
2002	Painted Fire	So-woon		
2002	Lover's Concerto	Shim Soo-in / Gyung-hee		
2003	The Classic	Ji-hye / Joo-hee		
2003	Crazy First Love	Ju Il-mae		
2004	A Moment to Remember	Kim Su-jin		
2005	April Snow	Seo-young		
2005	The Art of Seduction	Han Ji-won		
2007	Yobi, the Five Tailed Fox	Yobi	Voice	
2008	Open City	Baek Jang-mi		
2008	My Wife Got Married	Joo In-ah		
2009	White Night	Yoo Mi-ho / Lee Ji-ah		
2011	Spellbound	Kang Yeo-ri		
2012	The Tower	Seo Yoon-hee		
2013	Blood and Ties	Jung Da-eun		
2014	The Pirates	Yeo-wol		
2015	Bad Guys Always Die	Ji-yeon	China-South Korea co-production	
2016	The Truth Beneath	Kim Yeon-hong		
2016	The Last Princess	Princess Deokhye		
2018	Be with You	Im Soo-ah		
2018	The Negotiation	Ha Chae-yoon		
2025	No Other Choice	Lee Mi-ri		

=== Television ===
List of television series appearances
Year	Title	Role	Note	Ref.
2001	Delicious Proposal	Jang Hee-ae		
2001	Sun-hee and Jin-hee	Shim Sun-hee		
2002	Great Ambition	Choi Dong-hee		
2003	Summer Scent	Shim Hye-won		
2006	Alone in Love	Yoo Eun-ho		
2008	Spotlight	Seo Woo-jin		
2010	Personal Taste	Park Kae-in		
2011	Secret Garden	Herself	Cameo (episode 20)	
2013	Don't Look Back: The Legend of Orpheus	Jo Hae-woo		
2018	Something in the Rain	Yoon Jin-ah		
2019–2020	Crash Landing on You	Yoon Se-ri		
2022	Thirty-Nine	Cha Mi-jo		
2026	The Scandal	Lady Cho		
TBA	Variety †	Se-eun		
