= The Classic (2003 film) =

2003 film directed by Kwak Jae-yong

- Theatrical release poster
- Hangul: 클래식
- RR: Keullaesik
- MR: K'ŭllaesik
- Directed by: Kwak Jae-yong
- Written by: Kwak Jae-yong
- Produced by: Ji Yeong-jun
- Starring: Son Ye-jin; Zo In-sung; Cho Seung-woo
- Cinematography: Lee Jun-gyu
- Edited by: Kim Sang-bum; Kim Jae-bum
- Music by: Jo Yeong-wook; Choi Seung-hyun
- Production company: Egg Films
- Distributed by: Cinema Service
- Release date: 30 January 2003
- Running time: 127 minutes
- Country: South Korea
- Language: Korean
- Box office: US$7.6 million

The Classic (Korean: 클래식) is a 2003 South Korean romantic drama film written and directed by Kwak Jae-yong. It stars Son Ye-jin in a dual role, along with Zo In-sung and Cho Seung-woo.

== Plot ==
The film tells the parallel love stories of a mother and daughter. The story of the mother is told partially in flashbacks to the setting of South Korea under Park Chung Hee's military regime in 1968.

The movie starts in the present day. The daughter, Ji-hye (Son Ye-jin), is cleaning-up around her house when she comes across a box full of old letters and a diary that detail the story of her mother, Joo-hee (who is also played by Son Ye-jin). Periodically in the movie, Ji-hye reads one of these letters, which starts a flashback scene in which the story of the mother is told. These flashbacks are intertwined with Ji-hye's own story, in which she falls for a fellow student, Sang-min (Zo In-sung), who is involved with the school theater.

The movie tells the story of both relationships. The mother, Joo-hee, visits the countryside as a student one summer and meets Joon-ha (Cho Seung-woo). Together they explore the countryside, playing near a river which they both will always remember as their special place. When a storm starts they take shelter together under a tree, but not before Joo-hee twists her ankle and is rendered helpless. Joon-ha carries her on his back and they struggle home, only to be confronted by her angry parents. Before they separate, Joo-hee gives him a necklace, which he keeps close as a precious reminder of their time together.

Unfortunately, as often happens in affairs of the heart, a third party prevents any deepening of their relationship. Joo-hee has been promised by her parents as a bride to Tae-soo, Joon-ha's friend. But Tae-soo, a noble friend, finds out about Joo-hee and Joon-ha's attraction for each other and helps the two communicate secretly by letting them use his own name in place of Joon-ha's in their letters. When Tae-soo's father finds this out, however, he beats Tae-soo. Tae-soo tries unsuccessfully to commit suicide so that his two friends can be together.

Meanwhile, in the present, Ji-hye falls for Sang-min in whom her friend Soo-kyeong is also very interested, but he seems not to notice. Then, in a sweet scene, they take shelter from the rain together under the same tree. He uses his coat to cover both of them and escorts her to where she needs to go. The moment, while magical, does not go anywhere as she feels his help was only due to his generous nature and not from any feelings for her on his part.

Back in the past, Joon-ha is guilt-ridden over his friend's attempted suicide and Joo-hee's own guilt. Determined to prevent any more hurt to her, Joon-ha joins the army and goes to Vietnam. There he loses his eyesight while he tries to retrieve the necklace Joo-hee had given him. When he returns to Korea, he meets again with Joo-hee, and, trying to hide his blindness, convinces her he has married in the hope she will move on with her life. Though heart broken that their relationship cannot continue, she does move on and eventually marries Tae-soo, Joon-ha's kind friend. After they have been married for several years and have a young daughter (Ji-hye) Joo-hee is approached by friends of Joon-ha, who relate Joon-ha's last wish: that his ashes be scattered by Joo-hee in the river, now a reservoir, where they first met. She then finds out that Joon-ha hadn't married, but he later did after Tae-soo and Joo-hee were married. She was told that he had a son also. The heartbreak is too much and she cries.

In the present, Ji-hye's own story unfolds. Sang-min reveals his true feelings for Ji-hye — feelings that mirror her own. It is also revealed that their taking shelter together during the storm was no accident: he had purposely left his umbrella behind in a shop so that he could join her under the tree. Then, when Ji-hye pensively reveals her mother's story to him, tears stream down his face. Silently he lifts a necklace from around his neck and places it around hers. It is the necklace that Ji-hye's mother, Joo-hee, had given to Joon-ha when they met. The circle is completed: Joo-hee's daughter and Joon-ha's son have fallen in love.

== Cast ==
- Son Ye-jin in dual role as Ji-hye and Joo-hee (Ji-hye's mother)
- Zo In-sung as Sang-min
- Cho Seung-woo as Oh Joon-ha
- Lee Ki-woo as Tae-soo (friend of Joon-ha & Ji hye's father, Joo hee's husband )
- Lee Soo-in as Soo-kyeong (friend of Ji-hye)
- Seo Young-hee as Na-hee (friend of Joo-hee)
- Im Ye-jin as Shopkeeper
- Kim Jung-tae as Friend from the countryside

== Production ==
Several of the school scenes were filmed at various universities in Korea. Notably, the library was in Kyung Hee University. There are many parallels between the flashback and present-day stories. In the flashbacks, Joon Ha writes letters in the name of his friend Tae-soo to their mutual love interest. In the present day, Ji-hye writes letters in the name of her friend to their mutual love interest. In the flashbacks, Joo-hee has an annoying female friend that Joon-ha is initially set up with. In the present day, Ji-hye also has an annoying friend that interferes with her relationship. Also, Joo-hee and Ji-hye both receive the same poem from the people they love: "When the sun shines...".

== Music ==
Korean songs:

- "그랬나봐" ("Geuraetna bwa" - World without love) - performer: Kim Hyung-joong
- ""고백" ("Gobaek" - Confession) - performer: Delispice — played during the art gallery scene
- "너에게 난 나에게 넌" ("Neo-ege nan na-ege neon" - Me to you, you to me) - performer: Jatanpung — played during both special umbrella scenes
- "너무 아픈 사랑은 사랑이아니었음을" ("Neomu apeun sarang-eun sarang-i anieosseumeul" - It wasn't love if it hurt so much) - performer: Kim Kwang-seok - played during train and last meeting scenes
- "사랑하면 할수록" ("Saranghamyeon halsurok" - If we are in love, then...) - Played in different instrumental versions throughout the film — always at emotional moments. It is sung in the final scenes by performer Han Sung Min and is included in his album Sonnet. There are also two Mandarin versions of this song, one is titled "Huise Kongjian" (灰色空間) which is sung by Taiwanese singer Show Lo in the Taiwanese drama The Outsider II, and the other one is titled The Classic (假如爱有天意) which is sung by Chinese singer Li Jian in I Am a Singer 3 breakout round.

American songs:

- "Do Wah Diddy Diddy" by Manfred Mann
- "Hippy Hippy Shake" by The Swinging Blue Jeans

Classical works:

- The piano piece performed by Joo-hee on stage is Beethoven's Piano Sonata 8, movement 2 Pathetique Sonata. Pachelbel's Canon in D was also used as the background music. This same piece was featured in the director's earlier film, My Sassy Girl.

== Reception ==
According to Koreanfilm.org, there were 533,950 admissions to 49 screens in Seoul alone with total 1,545,107 admissions nationwide according to Korean Film Council.

Reviewer Darcy Paquet said that the film was a more traditional melodrama as compared to the director's previous hit film, My Sassy Girl. He admired the cinematography and the acting of Cho Seung-woo, but was disappointed by the performance of Zo In-sung. In the end, he said that it did not live up to the high expectations set by My Sassy Girl. Other reviewers provided similar comments, praising the cinematography and music, the acting of Son Ye-jin, and calling it a really good film, but with a few flaws that keep it from being great.

=== Awards and nominations ===
Year	Award	Category	Recipient	Result	Ref.
2003	39th Baeksang Arts Awards	Best New Actress	Son Ye-jin	Won	
2003	40th Grand Bell Awards	Best New Actress	Son Ye-jin	Won	
2003	2nd Korean Film Awards	Best New Actress	Son Ye-jin	Nominated	
2003	2nd Korean Film Awards	Best Music	Jo Yeong-wook	Won	
2003	11th Chunsa Film Art Awards	Best Music	Jo Yeong-wook	Won	
2003	11th Chunsa Film Art Awards	Best Lighting	Park Hyun-won	Won	
2003	24th Blue Dragon Film Awards	Best Director	Kwak Jae-yong	Nominated	
2003	24th Blue Dragon Film Awards	Popular Star Award	Son Ye-jin	Won	
2004	9th Moscow International Love Movie Awards	Best Couple	Cho Seung-woo and Son Ye-jin	Won	
2004	23rd Hong Kong Film Awards	Best Asian Film	The Classic	Nominated	
2004	11th Huabiao Awards	Outstanding Translated Foreign Film	The Classic	Won	
