= Blood and Ties =

- Film poster
- Directed by: Guk Dong-seok
- Written by: Guk Dong-seok
- Produced by: Park Jin-pyo; Kwon Tae-ho; Lee Han-seung; So Yoon-sung; Park Jae-hyeong
- Starring: Son Ye-jin; Kim Kap-soo
- Cinematography: Lee Jung-in
- Edited by: Park Gok-ji; Lee Yoon-hee; Han Eon-jae; Kang Kyung-hwa
- Music by: Park Ki-heon
- Distributed by: CJ Entertainment
- Release date: October 24, 2013 (South Korea)
- Running time: 95 minutes
- Country: South Korea
- Language: Korean
- Box office: US$11.5 million

Blood and Ties (Korean: 공범; RR: Gongbeom; lit. 'Accomplices') is a 2013 South Korean crime-thriller film written and directed by Guk Dong-seok, and starring Son Ye-jin and Kim Kap-soo. It follows a budding journalist who suspects that her doting father may have been the culprit in a kidnap-murder case 15 years earlier.

== Plot ==
Da-eun (Son Ye-jin) has completed graduate school and is set to become a newspaper reporter. She lives with her father Son-man (Kim Kap-soo) who lovingly refers to her as "my heart." Although her father does menial work, Da-eun is proud of him.

One day, Da-eun goes to the movies with her boyfriend Jae-kyung (Lee Kyu-han) and friend Bo-ra (Jo An). They watch a movie based on a real-life unsolved crime: A boy was kidnapped and the kidnapper demanded ransom from the parents, but the child was later found dead. The only clue the police had to the killer's identity was the ransom phone call he made to the parents. At the end of the film, they play the actual recorded audio from that phone call. Da-eun freezes when she hears the voice; the man's voice sounds eerily like her father and he also uses the phrase "It Ain't Over 'til It's Over," which her father always favored.

When Da-eun gets back home, she looks up on the internet the crime that had occurred nearly fifteen years earlier Awash in horror and guilt for even suspecting her father, she begins to look into his past with only a few days remaining before the statute of limitations lapses on the unsolved crime. As the relationship between father and daughter wrenches apart due to mounting distrust, a man (Im Hyung-joon) from Son-man's past suddenly appears.

== Cast ==
- Son Ye-jin as Jung Da-eun
  - Park Sa-rang as young Da-eun
- Kim Kap-soo as Jung Son-man
- Im Hyung-joon as Shin Joon-young
- Lee Kyu-han as Kim Jae-kyung
- Jo An as Yeon Bo-ra
- Kim Kwang-kyu as Detective Jang
- Kang Shin-il as Han Sang-soo
- Park Joo-yong as Choi Yong-joo
- Han Kyung-min as Son Kwang-min
- Seo Kap-sook as Shim Mi-ok
- Im Jong-yoon as Professor Kim
- Choi Eun-seok as Detective Kim
- Kim Ho-seung as Detective Min
- Jeon Joon-hyeok as Han Chae-jin
- Kim Do-yeon as Subway woman
- Song Jeong-woo as Mi-seon's father
- Kim Tae-ri as Mi-seon's mother

== Release ==
Blood and Ties was released in theaters on October 24, 2013. It topped the box office during its opening weekend, selling 648,000 tickets. It reached 1 million admissions in eight days, and at the end of its run, totaled 1,766,283 admissions with a gross of ₩12,333,094,882.

The film also received a limited North American release, opening in six cities in the U.S. and Canada. It screened at the CGV Cinema in Los Angeles on November 1, 2013, followed by Vancouver's Cineplex Silvercity, New York City's AMC Bay Terrace, Atlanta's AMC Colonial, Honolulu's Consolidated Pearlri and Toronto's Yonge-Dundas Cinema on November 8.

== Awards and nominations ==
Year	Award	Category	Recipient	Result
2014	35th Blue Dragon Film Awards	Best Leading Actress	Son Ye-jin	Nominated
2014	35th Blue Dragon Film Awards	Best New Director	Guk Dong-seok	Nominated
2014	34th Golden Cinema Festival	Best Supporting Actor	Im Hyung-joon	Won
