= A Moment to Remember =

2004 South Korean film by John H. Lee

- Theatrical release poster
- Hangul: 내 머리 속의 지우개
- RR: Nae meori sogui jiugae
- MR: Nae mŏri sogŭi chiugae
- Directed by: John H. Lee
- Written by: John H. Lee; Kim Young-ha
- Produced by: Cha Seung-jae
- Starring: Jung Woo-sung; Son Ye-jin
- Cinematography: Lee Jun-gyu
- Edited by: Steve M. Choe; Hahm Sung-won
- Music by: Kim Tae-won
- Distributed by: CJ Entertainment
- Release date: November 5, 2004
- Running time: 144 minutes
- Country: South Korea
- Language: Korean
- Box office: US$20.9 million

A Moment to Remember (Korean: 내 머리 속의 지우개; RR: Nae meori sogui jiugae; lit. 'The Eraser in My Head') is a 2004 South Korean romantic drama film directed by John H. Lee. It stars Jung Woo-sung and Son Ye-jin and follows the theme of discovery in a relationship and the burdens of loss caused by Alzheimer's disease. The film was released on November 5, 2004, in South Korea.

It was a major success domestically, topping the box office for two consecutive weeks to become the 5th highest-grossing film of 2004. The film was also a hit in Japan, breaking previous records of Korean films released there; it was the 19th highest-grossing film at the 2005 Japanese box office. John H. Lee and Kim Young-ha won Best Adapted Screenplay at the 2005 Grand Bell Awards.

The film was remade in Turkish as Evim Sensin in 2012 and in Hindi as Saiyaara in 2025.

== Plot ==
The first act of the film introduces the two main characters: a woman named Su-jin and a man named Chul-soo. The film highlights their accidental meeting, followed by their subsequent courtship despite their social differences that should have kept them apart. Su-jin is a 27-year-old fashion designer who has been rejected by her lover, a married colleague. Depressed, she goes to a convenience store where she bumps into a tall, handsome man, with whom she has a brief misunderstanding. Afterwards, she returns home, receives her father's forgiveness and decides to start her life over.

One day, while accompanying her father — the CEO of a construction firm — she coincidentally meets the man she bumped into at the convenience store earlier. His name is Choi Chul-soo and he is the construction site's foreman, as well as being a student architect. Although he initially seems like a rough, dirty construction worker, Chul-soo exudes pure masculinity. Su-jin instantly takes a liking to him and actively courts him. Many sweet events take place during their courtship, eventually leading to their marriage.

The second act sees the couple happily settling into married life. Chul-soo designs their dream house, while Su-jin learns to become a housewife. However, as time passes, Su-jin begins to display signs of forgetfulness. In one incident, a fire breaks out because she has forgotten to turn off the stove. Although Chul-soo managed to extinguish the fire in time, the seriousness of this and similar incidents led them to seek medical help.

The third act deals with Su-jin's diagnosis of early-onset Alzheimer's disease, and how the couple respond to it. Initially in denial, Su-jin is eventually overwhelmed by the knowledge that she will forget her husband. Nevertheless, they commit to staying together, and as the disease progresses and Su-jin's memory deteriorates, the couple face increasing challenges. Ultimately, Su-jin decides to leave their home and check into an assisted living facility.

Despite his grief, Chul-soo stays by Su-jin's side, even when she doesn't recognise him. He hides his tears behind sunglasses so she can't see them. At the end of the film, Chul-soo recreates the moment they first met in the convenience store, with Su-jin's friends and family present. In the final scene, Su-jin rides in a car with her husband at sunset, and he tells her, 'I love you.'

== Cast ==
- Jung Woo-sung as Choi Chul-soo
- Son Ye-jin as Kim Su-jin
- Baek Jong-hak as Seo Yeong-min
- Lee Seon-jin as Jung An-na
- Park Sang-gyu as Mr. Kim
- Kim Hee-ryeong as Mother
- Seon Ji-hyun as Jeong-eun
- Kim Bu-seon as Madam Oh
- Kim Joong-ki as Section Chief Cha
- Hyun Young as Yu-na
- Park Mi-suk as Ji-hyun
- Shin Cheol-jin as Manager Park
- Jin Yong-ok as construction worker 1
- Shin Hyun-tak as construction worker 3
- Kwon Byeong-kil as Ph.D. Lee
- Oh Kwang-rok as bum at station
- Jung Min-sung as passerby on cellphone
- Choi Gyo-sik as public officer
- David Lee McInnis as model

== Remakes ==
On October 22, 2008, it was reported that CBS Films had secured the rights for an American remake, with Susannah Grant attached to write the screenplay. After a turnaround, it was announced in February 2013 that Scott Pictures will produce and finance along with Sobini Films and Film 360 with Ben Lewin set to direct and Katherine Heigl has been cast as the female lead. On August 30, 2016, Josh Hartnett was in talks to star in the remake and Jena Malone replaced Heigl.

In the Philippines, on December 14, 2020, it was announced by "The One of Multimedia Alden Richards" on an interview with Philippine Entertainment Portal (PEP.ph) that there will be a Philippine remake of the movie starring him and "New One of the Generations Primetime and Movie Queen Bea Alonzo", the production will start in January 2021 with Nuel Naval as director and GMA Pictures & Viva Films will both producing the film. As of 2021, shooting of the film started as of November 2021, and the official title of the film was renamed to "Special Memory". By May 2023, it was announced that film was delayed due to scheduling conflicts with their projects and production issues. Alonzo was replaced by Julia Barretto in their role. By August 2025, the remake went in an overhaul, with GMA Pictures exiting the project, recast all main cast and rehired a new director. Bela Padilla and Carlo Aquino serves as the main cast, while Jerry Sineneng serves as the director of the remake.

== Awards and nominations ==
Year	Award	Category	Recipients	Result
2005	13th Chunsa Film Art Awards	Best Actor	Jung Woo-sung	Nominated
2006	15th China Golden Rooster and Hundred Flowers Film Festival	Best Actress in a Foreign Film	Son Ye-jin	Won
2006	42nd Grand Bell Awards	Best Adapted Screenplay	Kim Young-ha	Won
