= Lovers' Concerto (film) =

- Film poster
- Hangul: 연애소설
- Hanja: 戀愛小說
- RR: Yeonaesoseol
- MR: Yŏnaesosŏl
- Directed by: Lee Han
- Written by: Lee Han
- Produced by: Hang Sang-gu
- Starring: Cha Tae-hyun; Lee Eun-ju; Son Ye-jin
- Cinematography: Jin Young-hwan
- Edited by: Kim Hyeon
- Music by: Kim Sang-heon
- Production company: Popcorn Film
- Distributed by: Korea Pictures
- Release date: September 13, 2002
- Running time: 106 minutes
- Country: South Korea
- Language: Korean
- Box office: US$10 million

Lovers' Concerto (Korean: 연애소설; lit. 'Love Novel') is a 2002 South Korean film directed by Lee Han. It is a romantic melodrama dealing with friendship, jealousy and the ties that bind.

== Plot ==
(After spending a short amount of time in 2001, the film uses a non-linear structure through extensive use of flashbacks and timeskips of indeterminate duration, including flashbacks within flashbacks. However, each of the sequences, 2001 and 1996, occur roughly in order.)

Summer of 1996

Amateur photographer Ji-hwan chases after new customers, Gyung-hee and Soo-in, as they leave the cafe where he works. Soo-in feels uncomfortable when Ji-hwan declares his love for her on the street. He leaves and quickly returns holding a clock over his face with a note saying he has wound back time so his declaration of love never happened. Sometime later the women return. The trio bond and both women appear to be developing romantic feelings for him. All three quote from a film they saw together (Il Postino): "I'm in love. It hurts but I want it to go on hurting."

Gyung-hee is secretly happy when a magazine personality tests says she and Ji-hwan are good match. However, the cafe owner congratulates the other two on having found love and that hurts Gyung-hee so she fights with a confused Soo-in. They soon reconcile and runaway on a road trip with Ji-hwan.

During the trip, Soo-in watches Ji-hwan sleep and caresses a mole on his ear. In the morning she is absent and Ji-hwan nearly kisses a sleeping Gyung-hee. Soo-in tells Ji-hwan about her first love a boy with whom she spent a long time at hospital who kept her spirits up. She said she and the boy swapped names to keep connected even if they parted. The trio get caught in the rain and Soo-in becomes ill. While she rests alone, Gyung-hee cries and scolds Ji-hwan for being disturbed by seeing her cry (she is normally cheerful), then she leans in and kisses him.

After returning to Seoul, Soo-in is still ill and the other two go out. Ji-hwan says it's like a date. Gyung-hee becomes uncomfortable, scolds Ji-hwan for acting like her boyfriend when he isn't, and storms off.

Later at a party Ji-hwan comments that Soo-in is taking a long time to get over her cold. Soo-in sings a love song about the three of them and leaves early asking Ji-hwan to walk with her. She touches his face to remember it. Back at the party, Ji-hwan writes a note declaring his love for Gyung-hee. He asks Gyung-hee to give it to Soo-in, expecting her to read it. She believes it is a love letter to Soo-in and she secretly tears it up.

Some time later, Gyung-hee visits Soo-in in the intensive care unit. Soo-in reads aloud a letter that she has written to Gyung-hee saying she was expecting Gyung-hee and Ji-hwan to visit her as a couple. Soo-in gives Gyung-hee a wax-sealed letter to be given to Ji-hwan.

Late autumn or winter 1996

Ji-hwan has not seen his friends for months and he is chided by his boss for not getting their contact details despite all the time they spent together. Soon, Gyung-hee invites him for a drink. When they meet she dismisses her injured hand as meaningless. When he asks about Soo-in she tells him they became uncomfortable around him, he says the same about them and she leaves under a cloud. He stays and becomes drunk, punches the ground and falls asleep. He awakes in his bedroom with his hand bandaged. (A brief flashback shows Gyung-hee tending to his hand in his bedroom while he sleeps, kissing him, then leaving.)

2001

Ji-hwan opens yet another handmade envelope containing only a black and white photo with no sender information. He visits his former workplace, his friend's cafe, where his friend returns to him a box of photographs prompting Ji-hwan to track down Gyung-hee and Soo-in whom he has not seen for five years. A former classmate of theirs tells him that both girls missed a lot of school as they were very sick. The classmate says Gyung-hee died five years ago and Soo-in left Seoul after that.

Ji-hwan goes to the small town where the envelopes are postmarked but the postman denies any knowledge of the sender. (However, a brief flashback shows the postman sneaking into a woman's house and taking one of the envelopes from under her bed and he declares his love for the woman.) Ji-hwan hears children calling his name, only to find it is the name of their dog. The woman steps out of her house expecting to see her dog but instead she sees her former friend and Ji-hwan sees that Gyung-hee is still alive, albeit not looking as vibrant as she did five years ago. They touch each other's faces as Soo-in had touched Ji-hwan's face when they last parted at the party. Gyung-hee accompanies Ji-hwan to the wedding of the cafe owner where they make a wonderful couple.

Other flashbacks

- When Soo-in dies, Gyung-hee hops onto her bed and hugs her friend.
  - A flashback inside the flashback shows that the young boy in the hospital in Soo-in's story was actually a young girl, Gyung-hee, and that Soo-in hid in Gyung-hee's bed prior to Gyung-hee's surgery.
- The two girls swapped names as children but the school used their official names. (When the teacher said Gyung-hee died she was referring to the woman Ji-hwan and the rest of the movie called Soo-in.)
- Immediately following Soo-in's funeral, Gyung-hee punched a clock to break its glass cover and wind it back like Ji-hwan had done. This is why her hand was injured when she met Ji-hwan in autumn/winter.

After the wedding

Alone, Ji-hwan opens another envelope. It contains the sealed letter Soo-in wrote on her deathbed, saying she thinks she will be dying soon and giving him advice on how to date Gyung-hee.(In the flashback showing the letter being written, Soo-in draws a mark on her father's ear to match Ji-hwan's so that her dad will look more handsome.) The envelope also contains a letter from Gyung-hee. She confesses that she tore up his letter to Soo-in. She thanks him for his kindness and for passing on his love of photography to her. She thanks him for accepting her awkward kiss a long time ago. Then she says that she has been feeling very weak and has told her dad about what she wants at her funeral, including her beloved Ji-hwan. The camera pans to the beautiful blue sky, her voiceover says that she will be seeing Soo-in soon, "Goodbye Ji-hwan. I loved you before and I love you now. Goodbye."

The last shot is the trio in happier times, a photo taken on their road trip.

== Cast ==
- Cha Tae-hyun ... Lee Ji-hwan
- Lee Eun-ju ... Kim Gyung-hee/Soo-in
- Son Ye-jin ... Shim Soo-in/Gyung-hee
- Moon Geun-young ... Ji-yoon, Ji-hwan's sister
- Park Yong-woo ... Chul-hyun, Ji-hwan's friend
- Kim Nam-jin ... Seok-jin
- Sa Kang ... Min-young
- Shin Seung-hwan ... Min-sik
- Choi Jung-woo ...Soo-in's father
- Kim Hee-ryung ... Soo-in's mother
- Seo Yun-ah ... Ji-hwan's first love
- Yoo Hyung-kwan ... chauffeur Min
- Kwak Jung-wook ... young Ji-hwan
- Jeon Ha-eun ... young Gyung-hee
- Jung In-gi ... taxi driver
- Lee Moon-sik ... sleeping man on the bus
- Lee Yeon-ju ... guest at Chul-hyun's birthday party
- Choi Seong-min ... surgeon at children's hospital
- Kim Seong-su ... taxi passenger
- Jeon Hee-ju ... taxi passenger
- Park Jae-woong ... employee at cinema
- Lee Geum-ju ... Ji-hwan's mother
- Son Young-soon ... granny at amusement park
