= Ciné-Asie Creatives =

- Industry: Motion Picture
- Founded: 2008
- Headquarters: Montreal, Quebec Canada
- Owner: Mi-Jeong Lee
- Website: cineasiecreatives.com

Ciné-Asie Creatives was established in 2008 as a sister company of Ciné-Asie. The company is dedicated to sales and distribution of Asian films in Canada and Canadian films in Asia, as well as international co-production and location scouting in Quebec, Canada.

The first feature film in distribution by Cine-Asie Creatives was the Korean blockbuster disaster film, Haeundae. Currently Ciné-Asie Creatives is in possession of the Canadian distribution rights to two Korean Films: My Dear Enemy (2008) by Lee Yoon-ki and Breathless (2009) by Yang Ik-june. Ciné-Asie Creatives is also working on a feature film co-production project: Midnight to Four AM. In addition, Ciné-Asie Creatives acts as a sales agent for three films by the Inuit-Canadian director Zacharias Kunuk. Ciné-Asie Creatives has also established a cooperation with HanCinema, the largest and most comprehensive digital English database on the Korean TV and movie industry.

== Sales and Distribution ==
In June 2009, Ciné-Asie Creatives acquired the Canadian distribution rights to My Dear Enemy, a feature film from the Korean director Lee Yoon-ki (Love Talk, This Charming Girl). Ciné-Asie Creatives has also acquired the Canadian rights to its second distribution title, Breathless, by first-time director Yang Ik-june.

Since September 2009, Ciné-Asie Creatives is a representative of three films by the internationally acclaimed Inuit-Canadian director, Zacharias Kunuk, for distribution in Asian territories: Atanarjuat: The Fast Runner, Before Tomorrow (Le Jour avant le lendemain) and The Journals of Knud Rasmussen.

In October 2009, Ciné-Asie Creatives co-release Korean blockbuster Haeundae in cooperation with CJ Entertainment America in Canadian theatres in Montreal and Toronto.

== Co-Production ==
Ciné-Asie Creatives's first co-production project is an omnibus feature film, composed of six short films each shot by six different directors from Asia or of Asian origin. Countries currently participating include Canada, Korea, and Japan. The omnibus project has also been selected for the Pusan Promotion Plan at the Pusan International Film Festival 2009.
