= Kwak Sin-ae =

South Korean film producer

- Born: 23 October 1968 (age 58); Busan, South Korea
- Occupation: Film producer
- Spouse: Jung Ji-woo
- Relatives: Kwak Kyung-taek (brother)

Korean name
- Hangul: 곽신애
- RR: Gwak Sinae
- MR: Kwak Sinae

Kwak Sin-ae (Korean: 곽신애; born 23 October 1968) is a South Korean film producer who is the CEO of the Seoul-based Barunson Entertainment & Arts Corporation (Barunson E&A), best known as a producer of the 2019 film Parasite. She and Bong Joon-ho won the Academy Award for Best Picture at the 92nd Academy Awards for Parasite, which also received the award for Best Feature Film at the Asia Pacific Screen Awards, and was nominated for Best Film at the 73rd British Academy Film Awards.

== Career ==
Kwak graduated from Dong-A University with a degree in Korean Language and Literature. She began her career at a publishing agency before moving to a drama production company. Upon the recommendation of film critic Jung Sung-il, the editor-in-chief of Kino magazine, she joined Kino as a reporter in 1994, where she worked for about three years. Following her time at Kino, she served as the CEO of the film publicity agency 'Barun Life', the planning and marketing director at Youth Film, and LJ Film. She later worked as the director of planning and marketing at Shin Cine.

The reason Kwak decided to become a producer was unexpected. She was seeking stability in her life due to having a child and needed a regular job. This led her to join Barunson, a film company that offered a salary. In 2010, Kwak joined Barunson Corporation as the head of the film business division.

She later became the CEO of Barunson Film Corporation and has been the CEO of Barunson E&A Corporation since 2015. During her tenure as CEO, she oversaw the production of Hidden Time (2016) starring Kang Dong-won and the critically acclaimed Parasite, which marked her second film as a producer. Director Bong Joon-ho, who collaborated with Barunson E&A on Mother, has shared a synopsis of a new film set to be released in Korea following his work on Snowpiercer and Okja overseas.

Kwak reached a career milestone when Parasite won four awards, including the Academy Award for Best Picture. This historic achievement marked the first time in the 92-year history of the Academy Awards that an Asian female producer received the prestigious accolade.

== Filmography ==
=== Feature film ===
Feature film credits
Year	Title		Director	Credited as			Ref.
Year	English	Korean	Director	Marketing	Producer	Other Crew	Ref.
1999	Happy End	해피엔드	Jung Ji-woo	Marketing	—N/a		
2001	Wanee and Junah	와니와 준하	Kim Yong-gyun	Marketing	—N/a		
2003	Spring, Summer, Fall, Winter... and Spring	봄 여름 가을 겨울 그리고 봄	Kim Ki-duk	Marketing	—N/a		
2004	The Scarlet Letter	주홍글씨	Byun Hyuk	Marketing	—N/a		
2005	This Charming Girl	여자, 정혜	Lee Yoon-ki	Marketing	—N/a		
2005	Love Talk	러브토크	Lee Yoon-ki	Marketing	—N/a	Other crew	
2005	The Peter Pan Formula	피터팬의 공식	Cho Chang-ho	—N/a		Other crew	
2006	Romance	로망스	Moon Seung-wook	—N/a		Other crew	
2006	A Bloody Aria	구타유발자들	Won Shin-yun	Marketing	—N/a		
2006	Maundy Thursday	우리들의 행복한 시간	Song Hae-sung	Marketing	—N/a		
2006	Host & Guest	방문자	Shin Dong-il	Marketing	—N/a		
2006	Midnight Ballad for Ghost Theater	삼거리 극장	Jeon Gye-soo	Marketing	—N/a		
2008	Modern Boy	모던 보이	Jung Ji-woo	—N/a	PD	—N/a	
2011	Couples	커플즈	Jeong Yong-ki	—N/a	Production Department	—N/a	
2012	A Millionaire on the Run	5백만불의 사나이	Kim Yick-ro	—N/a		Other crew	
2016	Vanishing Time: A Boy Who Returned	가려진 시간	Um Tae-hwa	—N/a	Yes	—N/a	
2017	RV: Resurrected Victims	희생부활자	Kwak Kyung-taek	—N/a	Yes	—N/a	
2019	Parasite	기생충	Bong Joon-ho	—N/a	Yes	—N/a	

== Personal life ==
She is the younger sister of Kwak Kyung-taek, a film director from Busan famous for film Friend. While working as a reporter for Kino, Kwak married film director Jung Ji-woo.

== Accolades ==
Year	Award Ceremony	Category	Recipient(s)	Result	Ref.
2019	20th Women in Film Korea Awards	Producer Award	Parasite	Won	
2019	Yves Montand Cinema Award	Best Film	Parasite	Won	
2019	Asia Pacific Screen Awards	Best Feature Film	Parasite	Won	
2019	73rd British Academy Film Awards	Best Film	Parasite	Nominated	
2019	92nd Academy Awards	Academy Award for Best Picture	Parasite	Won	
