= Jane Jin Kaisen =

Korean-Danish artist (born 1980)

Jane Kaisen
- Born: 28 May 1980 (age 46); Jeju, South Korea
- Education: Royal Danish Academy of Fine Arts (MA); University of Copenhagen (PhD)
- Known for: Visual artist; filmmaker
- Awards: Montana Enterprize 2011; Beckett-Prize 2023; New Carlsberg Foundation Artist Grant 2023; 3-year work grant from the Danish Arts Foundation 2022
- Website: www.janejinkaisen.com

Jane Jin Kaisen (born 28 May 1980) is a visual artist and filmmaker based in Copenhagen, Denmark.

Working within video installation, narrative experimental film, photographic installation, performance, and text, Kaisen’s artistic practice is informed by extensive interdisciplinary research, creative collaborations, and engagement with diverse communities. Much of her work revolves around her birthplace, Jeju Island, the site of a yearlong anticolonial uprising in 1948 in opposition to US military occupation.

== Early life and education ==
Kaisen was born on Jeju Island, South Korea, and adopted to Denmark in 1980. She was a Professor at the School of Media Arts at The Royal Danish Academy of Fine Arts from 2020 to 2026.

She received her PhD from University of Copenhagen, her MA in Media Art and Art Theory from The Royal Danish Academy of Fine Arts and an MFA in Interdisciplinary Studio Art from The University of California Los Angeles. She also participated in The Whitney Independent Study Program.

== Career ==
Her narrative experimental film The Woman, The Orphan, and The Tiger (2010) made in collaboration with Guston Sondin-Kung explores the gendered effects of war and militarism by tracing a genealogy between three generations of women.

In 2011, Kaisen began the multi-channel video installation Reiterations of Dissent for which she was awarded the Montana ENTERPRIZE. The piece has been exhibited widely and in multiple formats, among others at Asia Culture Center (KR), Leeum, Samsung Museum of Art (KR), Aarhus Kunstbygning (DK), Kunsthallen Brandts (DK), Sonoma County Museum (USA), and The Jeju April 3 Peace Park (KR).

Kaisen is the co-founder of the artist unit itinerant with Guston Sondin Kung and together they have organized and curated a series of art exhibitions and events. She is also co-founder of the artist groups UFOlab (Unidentified Foreign Object Laboratory) with Anna Jin Hwa Borstam, Charlotte Kim Boed, Jette Hye Jin Mortensen and Trine Meesook Gleerup) as well as the artist group Orientity along with Natsue Haji OH, Kimura byol-nathalie lemoine, Adel KsK, Raymond Hahn, Naomi K. Long. The artist group Orientity has exhibited together in Kyoto Art Center (2004), in Hong Kong at Fringe Club (2005), in Montreal at Galerie La Centrale (2007), in Grenoble at la Maison Internationale (2008), in Lille at Maison Folies (2009) and at Art Space C, Jeju Korea (2021).

Kaisen has also curated exhibitions and events. She was a curator of the 10th Open International Performance Art Festival in 2009 in Beijing, China, which included performance artists from many different countries. Jane Jin Kaisen represented Korea at the 58th Venice Biennale with the film installation Community of Parting (2019). Her exhibition of the samle title at Kunsthal Charlottenborg was awarded “Exhibition of the Year 2020” by AICA - International Association of Art Critics in Denmark. Kaisen is the recipient of significant awards and recognition grants, including the Ole Haslund’s Artist Grant (2025), the Beckett-Prize (2023), the New Carlsberg Foundation Artist Grant (2023), a 3-year work grant from the Danish Arts Foundation (2022) and Montana ENTERPRIZE (2011) at Brandts. Recently Kaisen has participated in biennials such as the 13th Seoul MediaCity Biennale 2025, the 13th Berlin Biennale for Contemporary Art 2025, the 36th Ljubljana Biennale of Graphic Arts 2025, and the Hawaii Triennial 2025.

== Selected solo exhibitions ==
=== 2024 ===
- Halmang, Martin Asbæk Gallery, Copenhagen, Denmark
- Burial of this Order, Gallery TPW, Toronto, Canada
- Halmang, esea contemporary, UK

=== 2023 ===
- Braiding and Mending, The Image Centre, Toronto, Canada
- Of Specters or Returns, Le Bicolore, Paris, France
- Currents, Fotografisk Center, Copenhagen, Denmark

=== 2021 ===
- Community of Parting, Art Sonje Center, Korea
- Parallax Conjunctures, Museum of Contemporary Art Detroit, Detroit, United States

=== 2020 ===
- Of Specters or Returns, Gallery damdam, Korean Cultural Center, Germany
- Community of Parting, Kunsthal Charlottenborg, Copenhagen, Denmark

=== 2019 ===
- The Woman, The Orphan, and The Tiger, Seoul International New Media Festival, Korea
- Of Specters – or Returns, Inter Arts Center, Sweden

=== 2015 ===
- Of Specters – or Returns, Astrid Noack's Atelier, Copenhagen, Denmark
- Sites of Translation, Yonsei University, Underwood International College, Korea
- Loving Belinda, Galleri Image, Aarhus, Denmark

=== 2013 ===
- Jane Jin Kaisen – Reiterations of Dissent, Jeju April 3 Peace Park, Korea
- Jane Jin Kaisen – Solo Exhibition, Art Space C, Korea
- Revolution is not a Bird's Ete View..., Officin, Copenhagen, Denmark

=== 2012 ===
- Dissident Translations, Kunsthal Aarhus, Aarhus, Denmark

=== 2011 ===
- The Woman, The Orphan, and the Tiger w. Guston Sondin-Kung, Vox Populi Gallery, USA

== Selected group exhibitions and film screenings ==
=== 2026 ===
- K-Now! Korean Video Art Today, MASI Lugano, Switzerland
- A Museum Founded on Artworks - 2022-2024 New Acquisitions, Daejeon Museum of Art, Korea

=== 2025 ===
- With the certainty of tides, still I rise, John Hansard Gallery, UK
- Séance: Technology of the Spirit, 13th Seoul Mediacity Biennale, Seoul Museum of Art, Korea
- passing the fugitive on, 13th Berlin Biennale for Contemporary Art, Hamburger Bahnhof - Museum für Gegenwart, Germany
- The Oracle: On Fantasy and Freedom, 36th Ljubljana Biennale of Graphic Arts, Slovenia

=== 2024 ===
- Korea Artist Prize 2024, National Museum of Modern and Contemporary Art, Korea
- The Age of Human Wisdom, the 3rd Jinan International Biennale, China
- One Way Ashore, a Thousand Channels, Time Museum, China
- After the Sun, Gammel Strand, Copenhagen, Denmark
- Forms of the Shadow, Secession, Vienna, Austria
- After the Sun / Forecast from the North, Buffalo AKG Art Museum, US
- Film Screening: Burial of this Order, University of California Berkeley, followed by talk and Q&A

=== 2023 ===
- Myriad of Wishes, Gyeong Art Museum, Korea
- Between Waves, The Brooklyn Rail, New York, US
- Forest of Being Time, Taipei Fine Arts Museum, Taiwan
- Contexts of Existence, Musée d'Art De Joliette, Quebec, Canada
- The Woman, The Orphan and The Tiger as part of the series Power of Seeing, Cornell University, US
- Burial of this Order, Cinera World Premiere, CPH:DOX, Copenhagen, Denmark

=== 2022 ===
- Ceremony (Burial of an Undead World), Haus der Kulturen der Welt, Germany
- Korean Diaspora - Ricepaper Airplane, Incheon Art Platform, Korea
- Checkpont. Border views from Korea, Kunstmuseum Wolfsburg, Germany

=== 2021 ===
- After Hope – Voices of Resistance, The Asian Art Museum of San Francisco, United States
- At the Same Time, Jeju Museum of Art, Korea

=== 2020 ===
- Pan Austro-Nesian, Kaohsiung Museum of Fine Art, Taiwan
- Frequencies of Tradition, Times Art Museum, China
- Negotiating Borders, Foundation Fiminco, France
- Community of Parting, DMZ International Documentary Film Festival, Korea
- Community of Parting, 8th Diaspora Film Festival, Korea
- Our World is Burning, Palais de Tokyo, France
- Born, A Woman, Suwon Museum of Art, Korea
- Time Share, Performa Radical Broadcast, United States
- History Has Failed Us, but No Matter, Arko Art Center, Korea
- Screening of Community of Parting co-presented with GYOPO, Museum of Contemporary Art Los Angeles, United States
- Precarious Life – Silence, Memory and Fictions, Onsugonggan, South Korea

=== 2019 ===
- History Has Failed Us, But No Matter, 58th Venice Biennale Korean Pavilion, Italy
- Neither black/red/yellow nor woman, Times Art Center Berlin, Germany
- Screening of Tale of One or Many Mountains, DMZ International Documentary Film Festival, Korea
- Zero Gravity World, SeMA Nam Seoul Museum of Art, South Korea

=== 2018 ===
- Counter Memory & Reconstruction of Body Movement, Seoul International NewMedia Festival, Seoul Art Cinema, South Korea
- 10th DMZ International Documentary Film Festival, South Korea
- Decolonizing Appearance, CAMP / Center for Art on Migration Politics, Copenhagen, Denmark
- Film screening as part of Haegue Yang's exhibition Voices of Dispersion, Museum Ludwig, Cologne, Germany
- Jeju 4.3 is Now Our History, National Museum of Contemporary Korean History, South Korea
- Post Trauma: The Special Exhibition of the 70th Anniversary of the Jeju Massacre, Jeju Museum of Art, South Korea
- Forged from the Collective Memory, ArtSpace C / Artspace IAa Gallery, South Korea
- Forum Expanded: A Mechanism Capable of Changing itself, 68th Berlin International Film Festival

=== 2017 ===
- Border 155, Seoul Museum of Art, South Korea
- Today's Yesterday, 1st Anren Biennale, China, Today's Yesterday
- Does Europe Exist? V2.0, ARTos Foundation, Cyprus
- Tiempos Migratorios, Biennial ASAB, Columbia
- The Promise and Compromise of Translation, Four Boxes Gallery, Denmark
- Tourism, Jeju Biennale, Jeju Museum of Art, South Korea
- Asian Diva: The Muse and the Monster, Seoul Museum of Art, South Korea
- Soil and Stones, Souls and Songs, Art Center at the Jim Thompson House, Thailand
- 2 or 3 Tigers, Haus der Kulturen der Welt, Germany
- 2nd Changjiang International Photography and Video Biennale, China
- Nordic Delights, Finnish Museum of Photography, Finland
- The Time Share Project – The Real DMZ Project: The Aarhus Edition, Kunsthal Aarhus, Denmark
- Soil and Stones, Souls and Songs, ParaSite, Hong Kong
- Melancholia: Archipelago Journal screening of The Woman, The Orphan, and The Tiger, Enclave, United Kingdom
- Rough Trade, 68 Art Institute, Copenhagen, Denmark
- Nordic Delights, Fotografisk Center, Copenhagen, Denmark
- Film screenings: The Woman, The Orphan, and the Tiger & Reiterations of Dissent, New York University, United States
- Film screenings: The Woman, The Orphan, and The Tiger & Reiterations of Dissent, University of California San Diego, United States
- House of Memories, Glasmoog, Raum Für Kunst & Diskurs, Cologne, Germany
- Korea Film Archive, Feminism Video Artivist Biennale 2016, South Korea
- Crossing the Line: Contemporary Art From Denmark, Critical Distance Center for Curators, Canada
- Soil and Stones, Souls and Songs, Museum of Contemporary Art and Design, Philippines
- Vulnerability Matters Laboratory, Rauma Biennale Balticum, Finland
- For More Than One Voice: performative reading with Stina Hasse, Den Frie Udstillingsbygning, Copenhagen, Denmark
- ArtSpectrum, Leeum Samsung Museum of Art, South Korea
- Nordic Delights, Oslo Kunstforening, Oslo, Norway
- The Woman, The Orphan, and The Tiger, New York University, Department of East Asian Studies, USA

=== 2015 ===
- The Woman, The Orphan, and The Tiger, Husets Biograf, Copenhagen, Denmark
- A Feminist Culture Reader, Danske Grafikeres Hus, Denmark
- Interrupted Survey: Fractured Modern Mythologies, Asian Culture Center, South Korea,
- Glocal Panorama, Seoul International NewMedia Festival, South Korea
- Los Archivos del Cuerpo, Emerson College Huret & Spector Gallery, United States
- Reiterations of Dissent, Raindance Film Centre, London, United Kingdom
- Reiterations of Dissent, AAS Film Expo, Chicago, United States
- Rencontres Internationales video archive, Haus der Kulturen der Welt, Germany
- Arkiv over Hvidme, The National Gallery of Denmark – The Royal Cast Collection, Denmark

=== 2014 ===
- Reiterations of Dissent selected as opening film, Seoul International NewMedia Festival, South Korea
- Exclusion + Possibility, Gallery Zandari, South Korea
- Camelia Has Fallen: Contemporary Korean Artists Reflect on the Jeju Uprising, Sonoma County Museum of Art, United States

=== 2013 ===
- Women Commentators, Center for contemporary Art Ujazdowski Castle, Poland
- Tell Me Her Story, Coreana Museum, South Korea
- The Beginning is Always Today: Contemporary Feminist Art in Scandinavia, Sørlandet Art Museum, Norway
- War Baby/Love Child, Wing Luke Museum of the Asian Pacific American Experience & DePaul Art Museum, United States
- Visualising Affect, Lewisham Arthouse, United Kingdom
- Strom Festival, Kunsthaus Rheania, Germany
- The Nordic Model, Malmo Art Museum, Malmö, Sweden
- Dear Curator, Curate Me, Selasar Sunaryo Art Space, Indonesia
- War Baby / Love Child, DePaul Art Museum, Chicago, United States
- Korean American Film Festival New York, Sylvia Wald and Po Kim Art Gallery, New York, United States

=== 2012 ===
- 7 Generous Gestures, Galleri Lars Olsen, Denmark
- Women In-Between: Asian Women Artists 1984–2012, Fukuoka Asian Art Museum, Japan
- ENTER II, Kunsthallen Brandts, Denmark, ENTER II
- Videonale13 Festival for Contemporary Art, Kunstmuseum Bonn, Germany
- FOKUS Video Art Festival, Nikolaj Kunsthal, Copenhagen, Denmark
- IN THE ACT, Malmö Konsthall, Sweden, IN THE ACT
- ACTS, Roskilde Museum for Contemporary Art, Denmark
- 3 films by Jane Jin Kaisen, Øst For Paradis Cinema, Aarhus, Denmark
- Videonale13 Festival for Contemporary Art, Ars Cameralis, Poland
- Videonale13 Festival for Contemporary Art, Gallery of Modern Art Glasgow, Scotland
- Videonale13 Festival for Contemporary Art, Künstlerhaus Dortmund, Germany
- Korean American Film Festival New York, United States
- Jeju International Women's Film Festival, South Korea
- Island of Stone shown as closing film, Seoul Human Rights Film Festival, South Korea

=== 2010 ===
- Crossing the Sea, Jeju National Museum, South Korea
- MFA2010, The Wight Gallery, UCLA, United States
- Infr’acton Festival International d’art Performance, Sete, France
- Yamagata International Documentary Film Festival, Japan
- Taiwan International Documentary Film Festival, Taiwan
- The Dialogic Imagination, IASPIS, Sweden

=== 2009 ===
- 2nd Incheon Women Artists Biennale, South Korea
- EXIT09, Kunstforeningen Gl. Strand, Copenhagen, Denmark
- Boarding Bridges, Kring Gallery, South Korea
- Migrations, Municipal Art Gallery of Kalamata, Greece
- Borders, Amelie A. Wallace Gallery, New York, United States
- 2nd Asian Women's Film Festival Berlin, Germany
- 25th International Asia Pacific Film Festival Los Angeles, United States
- Yamagata International Documentary Film Festival, Japan

=== 2008 ===
- Breaking Out, Gana Art Gallery New York, United States
- The last Book Project, Buenos Aires National Library, Argentina
- 2nd Deformes Biennial, Gallery Metropolitana, Santiago, Chile
- Unnamable Name, Tompkin's County Public Library, New York, United States
- Privilege Walk, Lilith Performance Studio, Sweden
- This is not a Koreanobela: a film trilogy, The Green Papaya Gallery, Philippines

=== 2007 ===
- Traces in Photography, The National Museum of Photography, Denmark
- Orientity Exhibition, Gallery La Centrale, Montreal, Canada
- Exquisite Crisis and Encounters, New York University, United States
- Visions from the Periphery, Kyunghee University Art Museum, South Korea

=== 2006 ===
- South Korea as part of UFOlab: UFOlab Banana Power, 6th Gwangju Biennale, South Korea
- Rethinking Nordic Colonialism, The Faroe Islands National Art Museum
- Alternative Art Fair, Gallery Pixel, Denmark
- Global Alien Television, Ssamzie Space, South Korea
- International Indonesia Performance Art Event, National Gallery, Indonesia
- 4th DaDao Live Art Festival, 798 Art Zone, Beijing, China
- International Film and Video Festival, Hong Kong Arts Center, Hong Kong
- Malmo International Film Festival, Sweden

=== 2005 ===
- Accent, Museum for Contemporary Art Roskilde, Denmark
- Skin Deep, Echo Park Film Center, United States
- Bandits-Mages International Media Festival, Bourges, France

=== 2004 ===
- AREUM Vessel, Kyoto Museum of Art, Japan
- Orientity Exhibition, Kyoto Arts Center, Japan
- Our adoptee, Our Alien, Keumsan Gallery & Dongsanbang Gallery, South Korea
- Minority Report, Aarhus Kunstbygning, Denmark

== Awards ==
In 2008, she received the AHL Foundation Visual Arts award at Gana Art NY.

In 2011, she received the award Montana Enterprize at Kunsthallen Brandts.

In 2014, she was the recipient of the Mads Øvlisen PhD scholarship from the Novo Nordisk Foundation.

In 2021, Jane Jin Kaisen's exhibition Community of Parting at Kunsthal Charlottenborg was awarded "Exhibition of the Year 2020" by AICA - International Association of Art Critics, Denmark.

In 2022, she received a 3-year work grant from the Danish Arts Foundation.

In 2023, she received the New Carlsberg Foundation Artist Grant.

In 2023, she received the Beckett-Prize.

In 2025, she received Ole Haslund’s Artist Grant.
