= Kim Ji-soo (actress, born 1972) =

South Korean actress (born 1972)

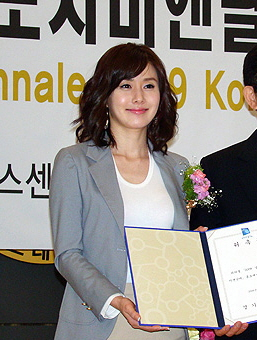
- Kim in 2009
- Born: Yang Sung-yoon; October 24, 1972 (age 54); Jeongseon County, Gangwon Province, South Korea
- Other name: Kim Ji-su
- Occupation: Actress
- Years active: 1992–present
- Agent: IOK Company

Korean name
- Hangul: 양성윤
- RR: Yang Seongyun
- MR: Yang Sŏngyun

Stage name
- Hangul: 김지수
- Hanja: 金志秀
- RR: Gim Jisu
- MR: Kim Chisu
- Website: kimjisoo.com

Kim Ji-soo (Korean: 김지수; born October 24, 1972), birth name Yang Sung-yoon (양성윤), is a South Korean actress.

== Career ==
A graduate of Kaywon High School of the Arts, Kim made her acting debut in 1992. She worked as a television actress for over a decade before branching out into film, saying in an interview that, "I was getting older by the second, and I hated becoming complacent." In 2005, Kim made her first big screen appearance with a leading role in Lee Yoon-ki's This Charming Girl, a character study of a twenty-something single woman working at a post office. The film was well received by critics, and Kim herself was singled out for praise, with The Japan Times commenting, "Kim's performance is a masterful balance of understatedness and open-wounded vulnerability." Kim won Best Actress at the Singapore International Film Festival, and Best New Actress at the Blue Dragon Film Awards, Busan Film Critics Awards, and Korean Film Awards, with a further nomination at the Grand Bell Awards. Due to the success of This Charming Girl on the international film festival circuit, and in recognition of her role in promoting Korean culture overseas, Kim was invited to a Blue House luncheon, where she met then-South Korean President Roh Moo-hyun and First Lady Kwon Yang-suk.

In 2006 Kim appeared in several films, first with Jo Jae-hyun in the melodrama Romance, though she was publicly critical about the lack of depth to her character. In October 2006, she portrayed a victim of the Sampoong Department Store collapse in Traces of Love, which was selected as the opening film of the 11th Pusan International Film Festival. In November 2006, Kim starred opposite Han Suk-kyu in the romantic drama Solace, receiving a nomination for Best Actress at the Korean Film Awards.

Kim returned to television in May 2008 with a leading role in the drama Women of the Sun. Her turn as a complex antiheroine garnered praise, and she won a Top Excellence Award in Acting at the year-end KBS Drama Awards and a nomination for Best TV Actress at the Baeksang Arts Awards.

In 2010 she starred in her first historical series The King of Legend which focuses on Geunchogo, the 13th ruler of Baekje. Shortly before the drama's premiere, Kim was involved in a drunken hit-and-run accident (this was her second offense; her first DUI was in 2000 for which she lost her license). Amidst a wave of complaints demanding that she be fired from the drama, broadcast station KBS stuck by the actress, and Kim released an official apology and paid the fine of ₩10 million. She was later listed among the top 10 highest-paid entertainers on KBS for the year 2011, with a salary of ₩400 million. Starring roles followed in Love Again (2012) and One Warm Word (2013).

When asked in an interview if she would consider appearing nude onscreen, Kim replied, "I don't want to take nude scenes to prove my passion for acting, which I have always had."

In November 2020, Kim signed with new agency Lead Entertainment.

In November 2022, Kim left Lead Entertainment and signed with new agency IOK Company.

== Personal life ==
=== Relationships ===
She was in a six-year relationship with actor Kim Joo-hyuk, with whom she co-starred in the 2002 SBS drama series Like a Flowing River. The couple broke up in 2009.

After her change in relationship status on Facebook was leaked in March 2012, Kim confirmed that she was dating a Korean-Canadian 16 years her junior. The couple split in 2013.

== Filmography ==
=== Television series ===
Year	Title	Role
1992	Female Detective 8080	Detective Cha Song-hwa
1992	Time of Ardor	
1993	Faraway Songba River	Lee Ok-im
1993–1994	To the Lovely Others	Lee Myung-sook
1994	General Hospital	Nurse Joo Kyung-hee
1994	M	Kim Eun-hee
1994	The Last Lover	Kim Joo-hee
1995	Little Heroes	Yeo-jin
1996	Sibling Relations	Lee Guk-hee
1997	The Angel Within	
1997	Mountain	Lee Soo-jung
1997	One-Act Play – "Two Mothers"	
1997	MBC Best Theater – "Solomon's Thieves"	
1997–1998	When She Beckons	Kim In-hwa/Jang In-young
1998	Love	Lee So-jin
1998–1999	See and See Again	Eun-joo
1998–1999	I Hate You, But It's Fine	
1998–1999	Letters Written on a Cloudy Day	
1999	MBC Best Theater – "Once in a Lifetime"	
1999–2000	Sweet Bride	Min-hee
2000	Bad Friends	Lee Sang-eun
2000	MBC Best Theater – "Dong-bo's Bluebird"	Ji-soo
2000–2001	Full of Sun	Park Ji-sook
2000–2001	Foolish Princes	Joo Jang-mi
2001	Wind from the Straits	
2001	Legend	Yoon Seo-yeon
2002	Sunshine Hunting	Song Hee-ju
2002–2003	Like a Flowing River	Park Sang-hee
2003	First Love	Yoon Seo-gyung
2004–2005	The Age of Heroes	Park So-sun
2008	Women in the Sun	Shin Do-young/Kim Han-sook
2010–2011	The King of Legend	Buyeo Hwa
2012	Love Again	Uhm Ji-hyun
2013	One Warm Word	Song Mi-kyung
2016	Memory	Seo Yeong-joo
2016–2017	Hwarang: The Poet Warrior Youth	Queen Mother Jiso
2017–2018	A Korean Odyssey	Na Chal-nyeo
2018	Where Stars Land	Yang Seo-gun
2020	365: Repeat the Year	Lee Shin
2021	High Class	Nam Ji-seon
2024	Romance in the House	Keum Ae-yeon

=== Film ===
Year	Title	Role
2005	This Charming Girl	Jeong-hae
2005	Murder, Take One	Jung Yun-jung (cameo)
2005	Love Talk	Jeong-hae (cameo)
2006	Romance	Yun-hee
2006	Traces of Love	Seo Min-joo
2006	Solace	Lee Hye-ran
2011	Come Rain, Come Shine	Woman next door (cameo)
2015	Gangnam Blues	Min Seong-hee
2016	Woo-joo's Christmas	Sung Woo-joo
2018	Intimate Strangers	Ye-jin

=== Variety shows ===
Year	Title	Notes
1995	Entertainment Weekly	MC
1995	MBC Popular Song Best 50	MC
1998	Live Dating 11	MC
1999	Seo Se-won's Super Stardom	MC
2000	To You Who Forget the Night	DJ
2005	Ya Shim Man Man	Guest (Episode 100, 188)
2006	Ya Shim Man Man	Guest (Episode 100, 188)
2008	LOVE	Guest (Episode 4)
2010	Sweet Rain	Guest (Episode 17-18)
2013	Thank You	Guest (Episode 8)
2015	Running Man	Guest (Episode 232)
2017	I Live Alone	Guest (Episode 197)

=== Music video appearances ===
Year	Song title	Artist
1999	"Are You Going"	Jinju
2001	"Should I Say I Love You Again?"	Kim Dong-ryool
2004	"Memory Loss"	Gummy
2006	"That Man, That Woman"	Vibe

== Awards and nominations ==
Year	Award	Category	Nominated work	Result	Ref.
1997	KBS Drama Awards	Excellence Award, Actress	When She Beckons	Won	
1998	MBC Drama Awards	Grand Prize (Daesang)	See and See Again	Won	
2002	SBS Drama Awards	Excellence Award, Actress in a Serial Drama	Like a Flowing River	Won	
2005	18th Singapore International Film Festival	Best Actress	This Charming Girl	Won	
2005	41st Baeksang Arts Awards	Best New Actress	This Charming Girl	Nominated	
2005	42nd Grand Bell Awards	Best New Actress	This Charming Girl	Nominated	
2005	6th Busan Film Critics Awards	Best New Actress	This Charming Girl	Won	
2005	26th Blue Dragon Film Awards	Best New Actress	This Charming Girl	Won	
2005	4th Korean Film Awards	Best New Actress	This Charming Girl	Won	
2006	Mnet KM Music Festival	Best Actress in a Music Video	That Man, That Woman	Won	
2007	6th Korean Film Awards	Best Actress	Solace	Nominated	
2008	KBS Drama Awards	Top Excellence Award, Actress	Women of the Sun	Won	
2009	45th Baeksang Arts Awards	Best Actress (TV)	Women of the Sun	Nominated	
2011	KBS Drama Awards	Excellence Award, Actress in a Serial Drama	The King of Legend	Nominated	
2014	50th Baeksang Arts Awards	Best Actress (TV)	One Warm Word	Nominated	
2014	SBS Drama Awards	Top Excellence Award, Actress in a Drama Special	One Warm Word	Nominated	
2018	SBS Drama Awards	Excellence Award, Actress in a Monday-Tuesday Drama	Where Stars Land	Nominated	
