= Love 911 =

- Promotional poster for Love 911
- Hangul: 반창꼬
- RR: Banchangkko
- MR: Panch'angkko
- Directed by: Jeong Gi-hun
- Written by: Jeong Gi-hun; Park Sang-min
- Produced by: Han Seong-gu; Lee Min-ho; Jeong Dae-hun; Yu Yeon-seo; Sim Jae-man
- Starring: Go Soo; Han Hyo-joo
- Cinematography: Park Yong-su; Choi Se-kyu
- Edited by: Kim Sun-min
- Music by: Jeong Se-rin
- Production company: ORM Pictures
- Distributed by: Next Entertainment World
- Release date: December 19, 2012
- Running time: 120 minutes
- Country: South Korea
- Language: Korean
- Box office: US$16.8 million

Love 911 (Korean: 반창꼬; RR: Banchangkko; lit. 'Bandage') is a 2012 South Korean romantic comedy drama film starring Go Soo and Han Hyo-joo about an unlikely romance between a dedicated firefighter with a painful past and a cold-hearted doctor who is solely focused on her career. It was released in theaters on December 19, 2012.

Han Hyo-joo received a Best Actress nomination at the 49th Baeksang Arts Awards in 2013.

== Plot ==
Kang-il is a rescue firefighter whose wife died while he was helping someone else in an accident. Struggling with guilt for being unable to save his wife, Kang-il frantically jumps into dangers to rescue others. Mi-soo, a doctor at a general hospital, makes a misdiagnosis and gets sued by the patient's husband when the patient ends up slipping into a critical condition. In danger of losing her medical license, Mi-soo's lawyer advises her to convince Kang-il to testify against the patient's husband for an assault that occurred while the husband was in grief. She sets out to win Kang-il over by "dating him."

However, Kang-il is not one to fall for Mi-soo's schemes and gives her the cold shoulder. At last, Mi-soo volunteers to be a paramedic to work alongside Kang-il and get closer to him.

Despite the initial cat-and-dog relationship, as they struggle through the dangerous rescue sites together, they gradually fall in love. But their relationship falls apart since Kang-il cannot let go of the memories of his late wife and furthermore when he finds out the real reason why Mi-soo approached him. Kang-il is driven once again into chasing after the most dangerous rescue sites, while Mi-soo can no longer stop him. Mi-soo is also diagnosed with a brain tumor which causes her to faint periodically. After failed to apologize to her patient's husband, she resigns her work as a doctor and meet Kang-il for the last time, where she confesses her love to Kang-il in the church. Kang-il gives no response and she leaves.

One day, Kang-il driven by his guilt towards his late wife, once again throws himself into a dangerous situation to save a trapped worker in a collapsed building. The situation is very dire and the firefighters can't save the trapped victim. But the stubborn Kang-il tries to rescue the victim despite angering his friends. Seeing the situation as a final goodbye, Kang-il shuns his friends and tries to save the trapped worker. Kang-il, reassuring the victim that they will make it out alive, talked about their loved ones and that is when Kang-il finally realizes who Mi-soo is to him. While he managed to get the worker out of the area by lifting the rock that traps the worker, the building collapses because of it and traps them both.

Mi-soo while heading for her brain surgery appointment with her friend, heard about the accident on the radio but once she heard Kang-il's name being mentioned as one of the victim, she gets out of the car and chases after him, not knowing whether he will survive or not.

The rescue team arrives at the scene and tries to use heavy machinery to dig out the rubble but the firefighters found Kang-il and the victim before they could use the machines and they're both safe but Kang-il is unconscious and is being sent to the hospital. Kang-il wakes after dreaming about Mi-soo and rushes out of the ambulance and heads to Mi-soo's hospital only to learn about her resignation. Kang-il rushes out to nearby bus stop and spotted Mi-soo running aimlessly at the other side of the road and he screams her name. They both finally reconcile and kisses while being watched by her friend and his coworkers.

At the end, it's business as usual for the firefighters and before going out on a mission, the captain warns the new recruit not to sleep on the first day and the new recruit turns out to be Mi-soo. She finally joins Kang-il and works together as firefighters.

== Cast ==
- Go Soo - Kang-il, firefighter
- Han Hyo-joo - Mi-soo, doctor
- Ma Dong-seok - Fire station captain
- Kim Sung-oh - Yong-soo, firefighter
- Juni - Hyun-kyung, firefighter
- Jin Seo-yeon - Ha-yoon
- Oh Soo-min - Ji-young, Kang-il's dead wife
- Lee Do-ah - psychiatrist
- Jo Min-ki - Chief Doctor (cameo)
- Yang Dong-geun - Detective Bang Je-soo (cameo)
- Jung Jin-young - policeman (cameo)
- Jo Kyoung-hoon - patient's husband
- Kim Seo-kyung - Young-mo
