= Ad-lib Night =

2006 South Korean film

- Film poster
- Hangul: 아주 특별한 손님
- Hanja: 아주 特別한 손님
- RR: Aju teukbyeolhan sonnim
- MR: Aju t'ŭkpyŏrhan sonnim
- Directed by: Lee Yoon-ki
- Written by: Lee Yoon-ki
- Based on: short story by Azuko Taira
- Produced by: Lee Yoon-ki; Yun Il-joong; Oh Su-seong
- Starring: Han Hyo-joo; Kim Young-min
- Cinematography: Choi Sang-ho
- Edited by: Kim Hyeong-ju; Jeremy Jeong
- Music by: Kim Jeong-beom
- Distributed by: KBS Sky
- Release dates: October 2006 (Busan); 30 November 2006 (South Korea)
- Running time: 99 minutes
- Country: South Korea
- Language: Korean
- Box office: US$12,626

Ad-lib Night (Korean: 아주 특별한 손님; lit. "A Very Special Guest") is the third film by South Korean director Lee Yoon-ki. It follows a group of boys from the country who have come to Seoul to find the runaway daughter of a dying man, who wants to be with him on his death bed. The film, based on a short story by Japanese writer Azuko Taira, debuted at the 11th annual Pusan International Film Festival as well as 57th Berlin International Film Festival.

== Plot ==
Bo-kyung (Han Hyo-joo) is approached by two young men from the countryside, who are both convinced she is Myung-eun, a girl who left the village years ago and whose father is now dying. When they realize she isn't who they think she is, the more outspoken of the pair, Ki-yeong (Kim Young-min), asks her to be the "stand-in" for a night, so that the old man can die after seeing his estranged daughter one last time. Despite her hesitation, she gets in their car.

== Cast ==
- Han Hyo-joo – Lee Bo-kyung
- Kim Young-min – Ki-yeong
- Choi Il-hwa – Ji-ho's father
- Yoon Hee-seok – Nam Taek-jong
- Lee Hyun-jung – Ji-ho's mother
- Kim Jung-ki – Young-eun's uncle
- Shin Yeong-jin – Young-eun's aunt
- Kwon Da-hyun – Lee Jin-young
- Gi Ju-bong – Myung-eun's father
- Kim Hye-ok – Myung-eun's mother
- Bae Jong-ok – Bo-kyung's mother (voice)
- Jin Yong-wook – Lee Sung-wook
- Lee Seung-yeon
- Yeo Min-gu

== Awards ==
=== 2006 ===
- 26th Korean Association of Film Critics Awards: Best New Actress (Han Hyo-joo)

=== 2007 ===
- 20th Singapore International Film Festival- Silver Screen Award: Best Actress (Han Hyo-joo)
- 9th Deauville Asian Film Festival: Lotus Air France – Prix de la Critique Internationale (International Critics' Prize)
