= The Pirates (2014 film) =

- Film poster
- Hangul: 해적: 바다로 간 산적
- Hanja: 海賊: 바다로 간 山賊
- RR: Haejeok: badaro gan sanjeok
- MR: Haejŏk: padaro kan sanjŏk
- Directed by: Lee Seok-hoon
- Written by: Chun Sung-il; Choi Yi-young
- Produced by: Im Young-ho; Chun Sung-il
- Starring: Son Ye-jin; Kim Nam-gil
- Cinematography: Kim Young-ho
- Edited by: Lee Jin
- Music by: Hwang Sang-jun
- Distributed by: Lotte Entertainment
- Release date: August 6, 2014 (South Korea)
- Running time: 130 minutes
- Country: South Korea
- Language: Korean
- Budget: US$13 million
- Box office: US$64.41 million

The Pirates (Korean: 해적: 바다로 간 산적; lit. 'Pirates: Bandits Going to the Sea') is a 2014 South Korean period adventure film directed by Lee Seok-hoon, and starring Son Ye-jin and Kim Nam-gil. The film was released in South Korea on August 6, 2014 by Lotte Entertainment. It has grossed over $64 million worldwide.

A standalone sequel, titled The Pirates: The Last Royal Treasure, was released in theaters on January 26, 2022.

== Plot ==
On the eve of the founding of the Joseon Dynasty, a whale swallows the Ming Emperor's Seal of State being brought to Joseon by envoys from China. With a big reward on whoever brings back the royal seal, mountain bandits led by Jang Sa-jung go out to sea to hunt down the whale. But he soon clashes with Yeo-wol, a female captain of pirates, and unexpected adventure unfolds.

== Cast ==
=== Main ===
- Son Ye-jin as Yeo-wol
  - Lee Do-yeon as young Yeo-wol; She was born in an environment where her father was a pirate and her mother was a haenyeo, but her mother was killed and became a pirate due to her father's pirate activities.
- Kim Nam-gil as Jang Sa-jung

=== Supporting ===
==== Pirates ====
- Lee Geung-young as So-ma
- Shin Jung-geun as Yong-gap
- Choi Sulli as Heuk-myo
- Lee Yi-kyung as Cham-bok
- Kim Kyeong-sik as Subforeman

==== Bandits ====
- Yoo Hae-jin as Chul-bong
- Kim Won-hae as Choon-seop
- Park Chul-min as Monk
- Jo Dal-hwan as San-man
- Kim Won-joong as Catfish
- Song Yong-ho as Snakehead
- Moon Seong-bok as Eel
- Jeon Won-gyu as Pine cone
- Lee Jae-ho as Cudgel
- Kim Jae-hak as Straw

==== Joseon officials ====
- Kim Tae-woo as Mo Heung-gap
- Oh Dal-su as Han Sang-jil
- Jo Hee-bong as Oh Man-ho
- Jung Sung-hwa as Park Mo
- Ahn Nae-sang as Jeong Do-jeon
- Lee Dae-yeon as Yi Seong-gye

==== Others ====
- Jeon Bae-soo as Baek Seon-gi
- Park Hae-soo as Hwang Joong-geun
- Lee Gyu-ho as Mool-gom
- Kim Ian as Baek Chi

== Release ==
=== Domestic ===
The Pirates sold 272,858 tickets during its first two days of release, placing second on the box office chart behind The Admiral: Roaring Currents. After 17 days in theaters, it became the third Korean film in 2014 to reach 5 million admissions. At the end of its run, the film reached 8,665,269 admissions, and also grossed US$64,414,955.

=== International ===
Lotte Entertainment pre-sold The Pirates to 15 countries at the 2014 Cannes Film Market.

== Reception ==
The film received mixed reviews from critics and currently holds a 57% rating on Rotten Tomatoes. Martin Tsai of The Los Angeles Times described the film as a "derivative trove of swashbuckling action, romance, comedy, special effects and revisionist history" which contains typical Hollywood devices, while Nicolas Rapold of The New York Times notes that "Neither the action nor the comedy in this action comedy is consistently strong." Frank Scheck of The Hollywood Reporter criticizes the film for its "endless slapstick fight scenes" and the film's special effects but praised the underwater scenes with the whales which he says have a "hauntingly ethereal quality."

== Sequel ==
A sequel of the film titled as The Pirates: The Last Royal Treasure, directed by Kim Jeong-hoon, produced with new cast of Kang Ha-neul and Han Hyo-joo was released on January 26, 2022 by Lotte Entertainment.

== Awards and nominations ==
Year	Award	Category	Recipient	Result
2014	51st Grand Bell Awards	Best Actress	Son Ye-jin	Won
2014	51st Grand Bell Awards	Best Supporting Actor	Yoo Hae-jin	Won
2014	51st Grand Bell Awards	Best Cinematography	Kim Young-ho	Nominated
2014	51st Grand Bell Awards	Best Art Direction	Kim Ji-a	Nominated
2014	51st Grand Bell Awards	Best Costume Design	Kwon Yu-jin, Im Seung-hee	Nominated
2014	51st Grand Bell Awards	Best Lighting	Hwang Soon-wook	Nominated
2014	51st Grand Bell Awards	Technical Award (sound)	Lee Seung-yup	Nominated
2014	15th Busan Film Critics Awards	Best Actor	Lee Geung-young	Won
2014	22nd Korea Culture and Entertainment Awards	Best Film	The Pirates	Won
2014	22nd Korea Culture and Entertainment Awards	Best Director	Lee Seok-hoon	Won
2014	35th Blue Dragon Film Awards	Best Director	Lee Seok-hoon	Nominated
2014	35th Blue Dragon Film Awards	Best Supporting Actor	Yoo Hae-jin	Nominated
2014	35th Blue Dragon Film Awards	Best Art Direction	Kim Ji-a	Nominated
2014	35th Blue Dragon Film Awards	Technical Award	Kang Jong-ik (visual effects)	Won
2014	1st Korean Film Producers Association Awards	Best Supporting Actor	Yoo Hae-jin	Won
2014	1st Korean Film Producers Association Awards	Technical Award	Kang Jong-ik (visual effects)	Won
2015	6th KOFRA Film Awards	Best Supporting Actor	Yoo Hae-jin	Won
2015	10th Max Movie Awards	Best Actress	Son Ye-jin	Nominated
2015	10th Max Movie Awards	Best Supporting Actor	Yoo Hae-jin	Nominated
2015	20th Chunsa Film Art Awards	Technical Award		Nominated
2015	9th Asian Film Awards	Best Visual Effects	Kang Jong-ik	Nominated
2015	51st Baeksang Arts Awards	Best Actress	Son Ye-jin	Nominated
2015	51st Baeksang Arts Awards	Best Supporting Actor	Yoo Hae-jin	Won
