= Solace (2006 film) =

- Theatrical release poster
- Hangul: 사랑할 때 이야기하는 것들
- RR: Saranghal ttae iyagihaneun geotdeul
- MR: Saranghal ttae iyagihanŭn kŏttŭl
- Directed by: Byeon Seung-wook
- Written by: Lee Hyang-hee; Byeon Seung-wook
- Produced by: Min In-gi
- Starring: Han Suk-kyu; Kim Ji-soo
- Cinematography: Lee In-won
- Edited by: Kim Hyeon
- Music by: Kim Si-hwan
- Distributed by: Cinema Service
- Release date: November 30, 2006
- Running time: 114 minutes
- Country: South Korea
- Language: Korean
- Budget: US$2,800,000
- Box office: US$1,542,750

Solace (Korean: 사랑할 때 이야기하는 것들; RR: Saranghal ttae iyagihaneun geotdeul; lit. 'Things You Say When You're in Love') is a 2006 South Korean romantic drama film directed by Byeon Seung-wook in his directorial debut. It stars Han Suk-kyu as a pharmacist who cares for his mentally disabled brother, and the relationship he builds with a debt-saddled woman (played by Kim Ji-soo) who sells fake designer clothes.

== Plot ==
In-ku is a pharmacist who runs his own store in Seoul. Although approaching middle age, he still lives with his elderly mother and mentally disabled older brother, In-seob. In-ku spends much of his time caring for his brother, and in the recent past had to end a relationship with his girlfriend, as her parents would not accept In-seob into their family. Hye-ran earns a living by selling fake designer clothes on a stall in Seoul's Dongdaemun shopping mall, a practise which has led to trouble with the police on several occasions. She is also saddled with a crippling debt, inherited from her now-deceased father.

While Hye-ran enjoys a night out with her family at a karaoke box, her younger sister announces that she is pregnant and wants to get married. Fearing that she will be left to pay their debt by herself, Hye-ran upsets her sister by telling her to wait and get an abortion. Meanwhile, In-ku gets a surprise visit from his ex-girlfriend, who wants to see him one last time before she marries another man. After sharing a meal they go to a hotel for sex, but once there he has second thoughts and walks away. Back at his shop, In-ku sits and drinks a beer by himself, when Hye-ran comes in looking for something to help her sleep. One thing leads to another, and they end up getting drunk at a local bar, before ending up back at the same hotel where they spend the night together. In the early hours of the following morning, Hye-ran sneaks away without saying a word, while In-ku pretends to be asleep.

In-ku and Hye-ran keep running into each other, gradually building up a friendship. They arrange a date, but when In-ku goes to meet her at work he arrives just in time to see her being taken away by the police, her stall having been raided again. At home, In-ku gets angry with his brother who has been throwing hysterics, though they later make up. Recognising the sexual needs of his older brother, In-ku arranges for In-seob to meet a prostitute, but things do not work out, and the two men end up going to a sauna instead.

Eventually, In-ku and Hye-ran manage to go on a proper date together, and after walking her home at the end of the night he surprises her with a kiss. Now spending time together as a couple, In-ku takes Hye-ran camping by a lakeside. As they talk, Hye-ran tells him about a song that used to get played at her elementary school at the end of each day, and how she wonders if they still play it. In-ku reminisces about In-seob in his younger days before he became ill, and how he used to enjoy hiking. The next day, In-ku decides to take Hye-ran to her old school, but their time is cut short when she gets a phone call and rushes off to meet her sister. Sometime later, Hye-ran meets In-ku at his shop; she feels guilty about being happy when she has so many problems, and decides to end their relationship.

As In-ku prepares for the death anniversary of his father, In-seob becomes hysterical again and runs off. In-ku goes out to look for him and tells his mother to stay at home, but feeling distraught she goes out anyway, and in a panic she runs into the road where she is struck by an oncoming car and killed. After the funeral, In-ku meets with Hye-ran for a heart to heart conversation. He admits to sometimes feeling resentful towards In-seob, but acknowledges that he is the only one left who can look after him. Sometime later, In-ku goes hiking with In-seob, sending photos of their journey to Hye-ran. Hye-ran finally visits her old elementary school, and, elated to find that they still play the song she remembers from her childhood, leaves a message on In-ku's answering machine.

== Cast ==
- Han Suk-kyu as Shim In-ku
- Kim Ji-soo as Lee Hye-ran
- Lee Han-wi as In-seob
- Jung Hye-sun as In-ku and In-seob's mother
- Kim Seong-nyeo as Hye-ran's mother
- Choi Ban-ya as In-ku's ex-girlfriend
- Jung In-gi as In-ku's friend
- Kim Ik-tae as drunk customer
- Oh Jung-se as Mi-ran's lover
- Yoon Ga-hyun as #53 owner
- Lee Mi-yoon as customer at clothing shop
- Kim Joo-young as yoga instructor
- Kim Kwang-sik as detective 1
- Han Dae-gwan as detective 2
- Choi Cheol-ho as lawyer
- Baek Ji-won as Shim In-sook
- Kim Ji-hyun as Lee Mi-ran
- Lee Ji-hyun as Hye-ran's business partner

== Production ==
The "surprise kiss" scene required much trial and error from the actors (Han Suk-kyu, left, and Kim Ji-soo).

Writer and director Byeon Seung-wook, who had previously served as assistant director on Peppermint Candy, spent five years working on the screenplay for Solace. His intention for the film was to focus on real-life issues and avoid the predictability of other melodramas, saying, "We tried to cut down on sentimental stuff as much as possible and tried to fill that space with an emotional one".

In the "surprise kiss" scene, Han Suk-kyu was required to spin Kim Ji-soo around in a commanding way, but this took much trial and error for the duo to get the desired movement. The scene was later singled out by The Chosun Ilbo as one of the "outstanding" film kisses of the season.

The film's original working title was Miyeol (meaning "Slight Fever"), a reference to the lead character's occupation as a pharmacist. However, a series of online surveys prompted a change, with people finding the title either too vague or confusing, or not representative of the film's romantic themes.

Solace was filmed on a budget of US$2.8 million.

== Reception ==
Solace was released in South Korea on November 30, 2006, and was ranked sixth at the box office on its opening weekend, later going on to sell a total of 216,876 tickets nationwide. In 2007, it was screened at the Udine Far East Film Festival and the Seoul International Film Festival, and received several nominations at the Korean Film Awards.

In a review for Variety, Derek Elley praised the performances of the two leads, and noted that while the film was "limited in its ambitions" and difficult to categorize, it nevertheless "ranks as one of last year's most satisfying South Korean pics in terms of accomplishing what it sets out to do."

== Awards and nominations ==
| Year | Award | Category | Recipient | Result | Ref. |
|---|---|---|---|---|---|
| 2007 | Korean Film Awards | Best Actress | Kim Ji-soo | Nominated | |
| 2007 | Korean Film Awards | Best Supporting Actor | Lee Han-wi | Nominated | |
| 2007 | Korean Film Awards | Best New Director | Byeon Seung-wook | Nominated | |
