= Ciné-Asie =

Canadian non-profit film and media company

- Company type: Non-profit Organization
- Founded: 1996
- Founder: Mi-Jeong Lee
- Headquarters: Montreal, Quebec Canada
- Website: cineasie.ca cineasiecreatives.com

Ciné-Asie (official name: Ciné-Asie Film Institute) is a Montreal-based, non-profit film and media company that seeks to explore the unique identity of Asian-Canadian media arts and artists. Its mission is to develop and create cinema that empowers people who are marginalized by mass media and to introduce the Asian cult and genre films to the wider public. Ciné-Asie is involved in many different projects including film contests, exhibitions and film screenings at the Cinémathèque québécoise.

In 2008, the company Ciné-Asie Creatives was established under the umbrella of Ciné-Asie. This division of the company is dedicated to the international co-production of Canadian and Asian films as well as sales and distribution of films between Canada and Asia. Ciné-Asie Creatives is currently developing a co-production feature film in cooperation with six Asian directors. In addition, Ciné-Asie Creatives acquired the Canadian distribution rights to the Korean films Breathless by Yang Ik-june and My Dear Enemy by Lee Yoon-ki.

== History ==
Founded in 1996 as a registered company, Ciné-Asie started its activities in 1997 with the "Three Korean Master Filmmakers" event in Montreal, Ottawa, Toronto, and Vancouver in collaboration with cinémathèques in Canada and the New York Cultural Center. Between 1998 and 2000 Ciné-Asie hosted monthly Asian and Asian-American film screenings and seminars in partnership with the Cinémathèque Québécoise in Montreal. During this time Ciné-Asie also organized Asian film events at the Asia Pacific Foundation of Canada and published the bilingual monthly local film newsletter "QuiFaitQuoi" on Asian film and filmmakers from Canada and abroad.

In 1999, Ciné-Asie was incorporated and co-organized "Chinese Cinema, 1933-49" together with Concordia University as part of the Film Society of Lincoln. That same year Ciné Asie organized the "Amérasia International Film and Video Festival" in Montreal and started to host monthly social events for the Asian Film and Video Art Society, a support group of Asian-Canadian artists.

After a six-year break Ciné-Asie resumed its work by programming and coordinating Asian-Canadian film screenings at the Asian Heritage Festival for Access-Asie, a non-profit organization in Montreal. In addition, Ciné-Asie intensified its collaboration with the Cinémathèque Québécoise in Montreal by organizing a retrospective of Korean Films in 2006 and of director Hong Sang-soo's films in 2007. In 2008 Ciné-Asie also resumed its monthly Asian-Canadian film screenings presented at the Cinémathèque Québécois.

== Ciné-Asie Projects ==
=== Film Screenings ===
Ciné-Asie organizes regular film screenings of Asian and Asian-Canadian films at the Cinémathèque Québécoise.

List of Screenings:

- January 2011 - The Man from Nowhere

The Man From Nowhere His only friend called him 'the man from nowhere' ... Taesik, a former special agent becomes a loner after losing his wife in a miserable accident and lives a bitter life running a pawnshop. He only has a few customers and a friend named Somi, a little girl next door. As Taesik spends more and more time with Somi, he gets attached to her. Then Somi is kidnapped by a gang and as Taesik tries to save her by becoming deeply associated with the gang, his mysterious past is revealed ...

- July 2009 - L'Empire Du Désir, Films Érotiques Japonais

Showcase of erotic films from the genre of pinku eiga (Pink film) including films from Tetsuji Takechi, Kan Mukai, and Noboru Tanaka in partnership with Fantasia Festival

- May 2009 - Irezumi – Spirit of Tattoo (Sekka Tomurai Zashi) [1982]

Director: Yoichi Tokabayashi

- April 2009 - Life on a String (Bian zou bian chang) [1991]

Director: Chen Kaige

Nominated for the Golden Palm Award at the Cannes Film Festival and winner of the Golden Tulip Award at the Istanbul International Film Festival

- March 2009 - Chungking Express (Chongqing senlin) [1994]

Director: Wong Kar-wai

Cinematographer: Christopher Doyle and Wai-keung Lau

Winner of the 1997 Independent Spirit Award for Best Foreign film

=== National Video Portrait Contest ===
Since 2008, Ciné-Asie hosts an annual Video Portrait Contest. The contest is an event that provides emerging Asian and Canadian visual media artists with an opportunity to show their short films in public. The films are judged by a panel of five jury members from the professional filmmaking and visual media arts industry. In 2009, the participating jury members were:

Yung Chang, director of Up the Yangtze (2007); Germaine Ying Gee Wong, producer of Up the Yangtze (2007); Malcolm Guy, producer, director, and president of Productions Multi-Monde; Liz Ferguson, film critic for the Montreal Gazette; and François Laurent, director and president of the Cinema Students Association (CSA) of Concordia University.

The winning short films of Ciné-Asie's second National Portrait Contest in 2009 were: Nguyen-Anh Nguyen with Mon nom est Tuan (2008); Jason Karman with State of Yo (2007); Kelly-Anne Riess with A Tall Tale (2009); and Mina Vladimir with Harvest Moon (2009).

=== Jeon Soo-il retrospective tour ===
Ciné-Asie, in cooperation with the Cinémathéque Québécoise in Montreal, will show a retrospective of South Korean director Jeon Soo-il 's feature films, including his latest film With a Girl of Black Soil (2007). The entire retrospective will be screened from November 2009 until January 2010, starting in Montreal, with stops in Ottawa, Toronto, Vancouver and Los Angeles.
