= Kimura byol-nathalie lemoine =

South Korean Belgian artist (b. 1968)

kimura byol lemoine
- Born: kimura byol (real name) Mihee (Korean orphan name) & Nathalie Lemoine (adopted name); 1968 (age 57–58); Busan, South Korea
- Other names: Nathalie Lemoine, Mihee-Nathalie Lemoine, Kimura Byol, star-kim, kim byul, Cho Mihee-Nathalie Lemoine
- Occupations: Activist & artist & Archivist
- Years active: 1988-present
- Known for: Activism, feminism, art, Queer
- Notable work: Adoption
- Website: http://starkimproject.com

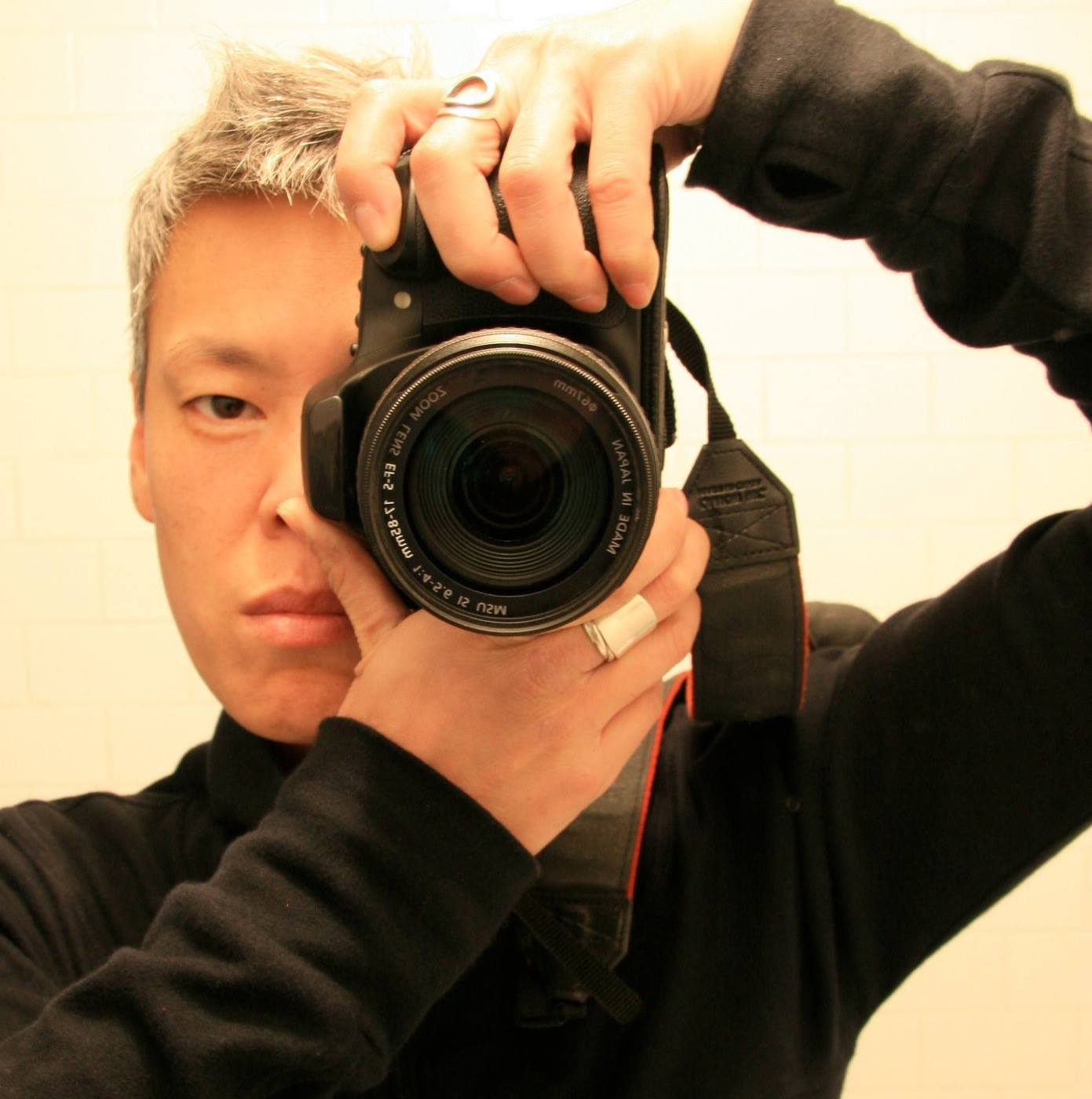
kimura byol lemoine

kimura byol lemoine (born 1968) is a South Korean-born, Belgium-raised activist, feminist and artist.

== Biography ==
Although currently using the name "kimura byol lemoine," (since 2021) this artist has also published under the following names: Mihee-Nathalie Lemoine, Nathalie Lemoine, star-kim, Cho Mihee and kimura byol.

kimura*lemoine was born in 1968 in Busan, South Korea. Ze was adopted from South Korea to a Belgian childless couple then raised in Belgium. kimura-lemoine returned to South Korea for 13 years (1993 and 2006).

kimura*lemoine uses the gender neutral pronouns 'ze' and 'zer'. Ze said ze consider zerself to be "international" as opposed to any one cultural identity.

== Activism ==
kimura-lemoine co-founded the first Korean adoptee association "Euro-Korean League" (EKL) in Brussels in 1991, then a Korean branch in Korea in 1994 which was the very first Korean adoptee association in Korea. Ze co-founded Global Overseas Adoptees' Link in 1998, an organization which aims to help adoptees find their birth families and adjust to living in that country. Being queer, ze set-upped, in summer 2007, a facebook group "A.Q.A" for Asian, African, Aborigine/Autochtones Queer Adoptees. In 2016, ze creates Adoptee Cultural Archives (ACA) website to gather cultural works of inter-racial or/and international adoptees. In 2005, ze was called the "face of overseas adoption" in South Korea.

== Art ==
kimura*lemoine began creating art in 1988 with zer short Super 8mm film "Adoption" that won the First prize at the Brussels International Super 8mm & Video Film Festival in 1988. After moving to South Korea in 1993, ze pursued her artwork in painting and calligraphy. kimura-lemoine is a conceptual and multimedia artist who was initially influenced by German expressionism, but came to combine oriental elements. The art's themes touch on racial identity, gender, adoption and feelings of diaspora. The art work attempts to challenge perceptions of national, gender identity, confront fantasies about Asians in the west, and also Korean constraints. Lemoine's preferred mediums are calligraphy, painting, manipulated images, poetry, video and photography.

Zer art work was first exhibited in the "Orientity" exhibit at the Hong Kong Fringe Club in Kyoto, Japan in 2005. In 2017, they directed the documentary "lesbian ARTivism" which features lesbian artists from different parts of the world.

kimura*lemoine directed "#6261" (with NFB, documentary, 2016) and "Adoption 30 years after" (documentary, 2020) and had a 'retrospective' show at Dazibao Gallery (2020) and an art residency and exhibit at PHI Foundation (2021) Zer videos are distributed by 'Groupe Intervention Video' (Montreal) and 'Centre Audiovisuel Simone de Beauvoir' (Paris)

== Awards ==
kimura*lemoine has earned the following awards:

- Prix Regard sur Montréal, Conseil des Arts de Montréal, Office National du Film, SODEC (Montreal, 2017)
- PowerHouse Prize, La Centrale (Montreal, 2016)
- 2nd Prize, CineAsie, Montreal Arts Interculturels (Montreal, 2015)
- 1st Prize, Ciné Asie de la Vidéo, Asian Short video Contest for Disadoption (Montreal, 2008)
- 1st prize, Scenario Competition, Seoul International Documentary Film Festival for To Korea, Mother Nation (Seoul, 1996)
- 3rd & Humor Prize, International Short Film Competition for "Ohida San" (Brussels, 1989)
- Grand Prix (Être jeune aujourd'hui en Europe Program competition), International Super 8 and Video Film Festival for Adoption (Brussels, 1988)

== Selected solo exhibitions ==
The artist's selected solo exhibitions include:

- Dazibao, "kimura byol - cho mihee - nathalie lemoine" ( Montréal, 2020)
- Espace Zinéma, "Lausanne Kimchifié" (Lausanne, 2006)
- Galerie Artinus, "Oui Mais Non" (Seoul, 2003)
- Galerie Kwanghwamun, "Rainbow Korea" (Seoul, 2002)
- Centre Culturel Français, "Between TWO" (Seoul, 1998)
- Galerie Munhwa Ilbo, "Ugly Beauty", (Seoul, 1997)

== Selected group exhibitions ==
- Fondation PHI "... Et de la place dans le sac aux étoiles" (Tiohtià:ke, 2021)
- AHL, "Dislocation' (New York City,2021)
- Galerie Bradley Ertaskiran, "En bonne compagnie" (Tiohtià:ke, 2020)
- Arsenal, "Vrai ou Faux" (Art souterrain, Montreal, 2019)
- Galerie Émilie Dujat, "L’Homme", Bruxelles (2013)
- New York Korean Culture Center, "Adoption: Palimpsest of Identity", New York (2008)
- Kyoto Art Center, "Orientity" (Kyoto, 2004)
- Gwangju Biennale, "THERE" (Gwangju, 2002)
- Ilmin Museum, "Made in Korea" (A-LinK, 2000)
- Korean-American Museum, "Snaposhot" (Los Angeles, 1999)
- Samsung Insurance Gallery, "West to East" (Daejeon, 1996)

== Selected articles ==
Following is a short list of selected news paper and magazine articles about kimura*lemoine:

- Larochelle, Samuel. "In a world where everything is intersex", Canada Media Fund, tiohtià:ke/montréal/montreal, 27 October 2020
- Vogel, Kevin. "Feminism, lesbianism, artistry, and activism", McGill Tribune, Montreal, 7 November 2017
- Jones, Maggie. "Why a Generation of Adoptees is Returning‘, New York Times Magazine, 18 January 2015
- O'brien, Bridget. "Farewell Foreign Femme", The Korea Times, 14–15 January 2006
- Hua, Vanessa. "Korean-born in U.S. return to a home they never knew. Many locate lost families, others work to change international adoption policy", San Francisco Chronicle, 11 September 2005
- Woyke, Elizabeth. "Homeland divided", Hyphen, Issue 6, Summer 2005
- Pons, Philippe. "La quête d'identité d'une 'Coréenne de nulle part' Le Monde, 23–24 June 2002
- Neuwels, Fabienne, "Retour aux sources de jeunes adoptés" Le Soir, 4–5 July 1992
- Peyret, Emmanuèle. "Les cahiers du Jeudi: Les Européens en Europe", p. 25 Libération, 19 January 1990
