= Han Hyo-joo =

South Korean actress (born 1987)

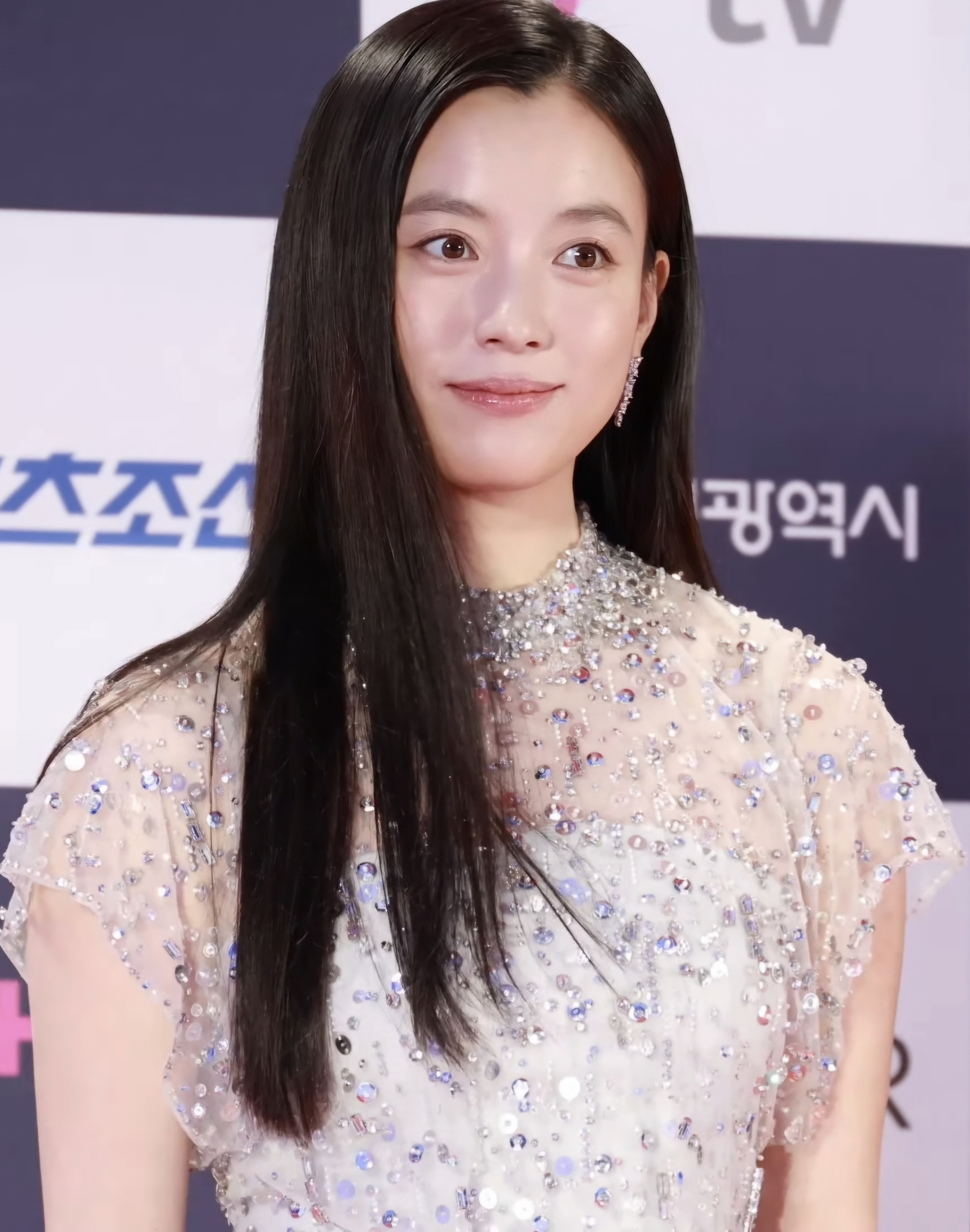
- Han in July 2024
- Born: Han Ji-yeong; February 22, 1987 (age 39); Cheongju, South Korea
- Education: Dongguk University – Department of Theatre and Film
- Occupations: Actress; model; singer
- Years active: 2003–present
- Agents: BH Entertainment; FlaMme
- Height: 170 cm (5 ft 7 in)

Korean name
- Hangul: 한효주
- Hanja: 韓孝周
- RR: Han Hyoju
- MR: Han Hyoju
- Website: bhent.co.kr flamme.co.jp

Signature
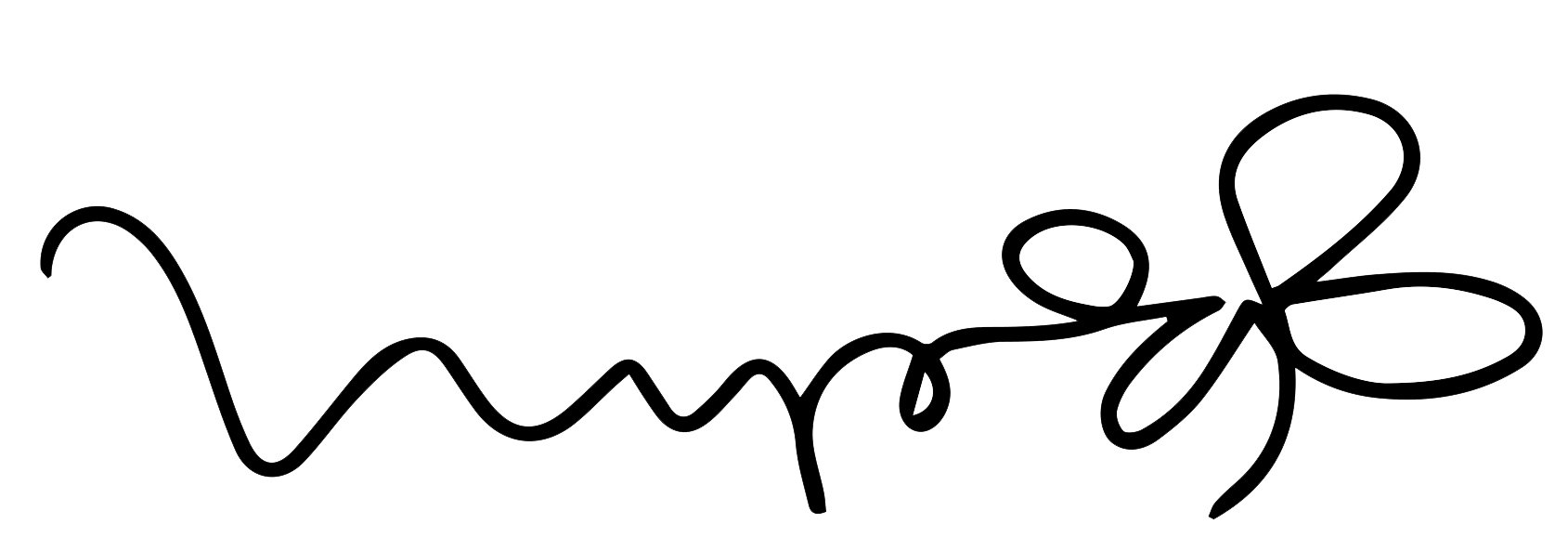

Han Hyo-joo (Korean: 한효주; born Han Ji-yeong, February 22, 1987) is a South Korean actress. She gained wide recognition with the back-to-back successes of Brilliant Legacy (2009) and Dong Yi (2010), both of which were massive hits with high viewership ratings, solidifying her status as a household name. She is also known for the romantic fantasy drama W (2016) set in a parallel universe, and the apocalyptic zombie thriller Happiness (2021). In 2023, she starred in the high-profile Moving (2023), a supernatural action sci-fi series exploring super powered characters who lead ordinary lives. It became the most watched Korean original series on Disney+ globally and Hulu in the United States, and a second season is currently in production.

The pan-Asian and global popularity of her works have established Han as a top Hallyu star. She has been featured multiple times in Forbes magazine's Korea Power Celebrity 40 list since 2011, and has been the commercial face of many major Korean brands such as Samsung, LG and Lotte. In recent years, she has served as brand ambassador to luxury fashion houses such as Chanel, Louis Vuitton, Burberry, Ferragamo, Brunello Cucinelli and Tiffany & Co.

In addition to her prolificacy on the small screen, Han is considered a respected leading actress in the Korean film industry. She has gained acclaim for her work in a wide range of genres; from melodramas, romantic comedies, large-scale action movies to crime thrillers. Her notable starring roles in box-office hits and critical successes include My Boss, My Teacher (2006), Always (2011), Masquerade (2012), Love 911 (2012), Cold Eyes (2013), and The Beauty Inside (2015). In 2021, Han was selected by the Korean Film Council (KOFIC) as one of the 200 Korean actors that best represent the present and future of Korea's movie scene, with the aim of introducing them to professionals that work in the global film industry.

The recipient of numerous accolades, Han has won Best Actress honors at all three of Korea's most prestigious award ceremonies – the Baeksang Arts Award for her performance as the titular character in Dong Yi, the Blue Dragon Film Award for her performance in Cold Eyes, and the Grand Bell Award (Korean equivalent of the Academy Awards) for her most recent role in Moving.

== Early life ==
Han Hyo-joo was born in Yullryang-dong, Cheongju, North Chungcheong Province. Her mother was an elementary school teacher before becoming an inspector for public schools, and her father was an air force lieutenant colonel who served at a reserve. At the time of her birth, Han was given the name Han Ji-yeong (Korean: 한지영) but when she entered the third grade, she changed it to her current name. She also has a younger brother and attended Deokseong Elementary School. As a child, she was good in sports, particularly track and field.

After graduating from Yullyang Middle School in 2002, she attended Cheongju Girls' High School until 2004. In her sophomore year of high school, she moved to Seoul and transferred to Bulgok High School in Bundang District, Seongnam, despite the objections of her strict and conservative father. After graduating in March 2005, she entered Dongguk University's College of Arts, where she joined the Theater and Film department, and eventually graduated in 2010.

== Career ==
=== 2003–2006: Beginnings ===
Han was first discovered in a teenage beauty pageant organized by food corporation Binggrae in 2003. She began her acting career in the sitcom Nonstop 5 and the gangster comedy film My Boss, My Teacher. Han later raised her profile by starring in Spring Waltz, the fourth and final installment of TV director Yoon Seok-ho's "season drama" series.

In 2006, director Lee Yoon-ki cast Han in the starring role in his low-budget independent film Ad-lib Night, which follows a young woman who rediscovers herself through an eerie overnight encounter with strangers. She won the Best New Actress awards at the Korean Association of Film Critics Awards and Singapore International Film Festival for her performance.

=== 2007–2010: Breakthrough roles and overseas popularity ===
Han then starred in two highly successful TV projects and rose to fame - KBS daily drama Heaven & Earth with Park Hae-jin in 2007, and SBS masked-adventurer series Iljimae with Lee Joon-gi in 2008. Both dramas drew solid viewership ratings nationwide throughout its run with high viewer ratings and launched Han into a household name. Afterwards, she was cast in another indie film, Ride Away, which debuted at the 2008 Jeonju International Film Festival.

Han then filmed the Korean-Japanese telecinema co-production Heaven's Postman, which also featured pop star Jaejoong from TVXQ (now JYJ). After several postponements, it was released in theaters in late 2009, and broadcast on TV in 2010.

Han's breakthrough came in Brilliant Legacy costarring Lee Seung-gi, which became a massive hit in 2009, reaching a peak viewership rating of 47.1%. It catapulted Han to stardom, and after the drama's conclusion, she experienced a sharp rise in endorsement deals and media requests for interviews, as well as increased pan-Asian popularity. Later that year Han wrapped up her starring role in the musical drama Soul Special, which aired on KBS Joy.

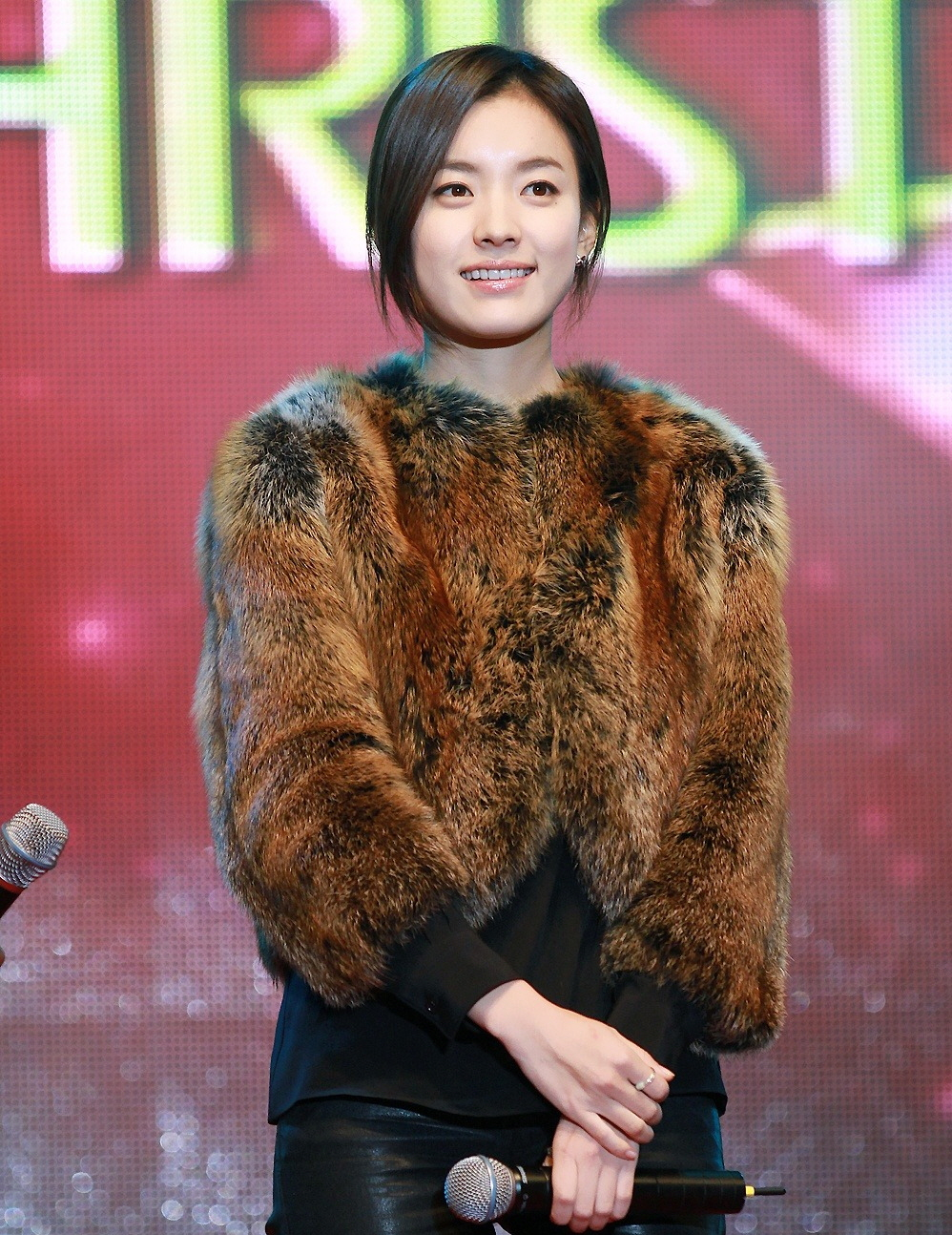
Han in 2010

In 2010, Han took on the titular character in MBC's 49th anniversary project Dong Yi. The series became a hit during its run both domestically and across Asia. Han won several acting awards for her portrayal of Choi Suk-bin, including the Daesang (Grand Prize) award at MBC Drama Awards and the coveted Best Actress award at Baeksang Arts Awards.

=== 2011–2015: Film roles ===
In 2011, Han played a blind telemarketer opposite So Ji-sub's ex-boxer in the melodrama film Always. Helmed by director Song Il-gon, it premiered as the opening film of the 2011 Busan International Film Festival. Han later contributed voice narration to the "barrier-free" version of Japanese film My Back Page, which features descriptive audio and subtitles for people with hearing or visual impairments.

Han then played the queen to Lee Byung-hun's Gwanghae in the 2012 blockbuster period film Masquerade, which became one of the highest-grossing Korean films of all time. She followed that with Love 911, an unlikely romance between a doctor and a firefighter (Go Soo).

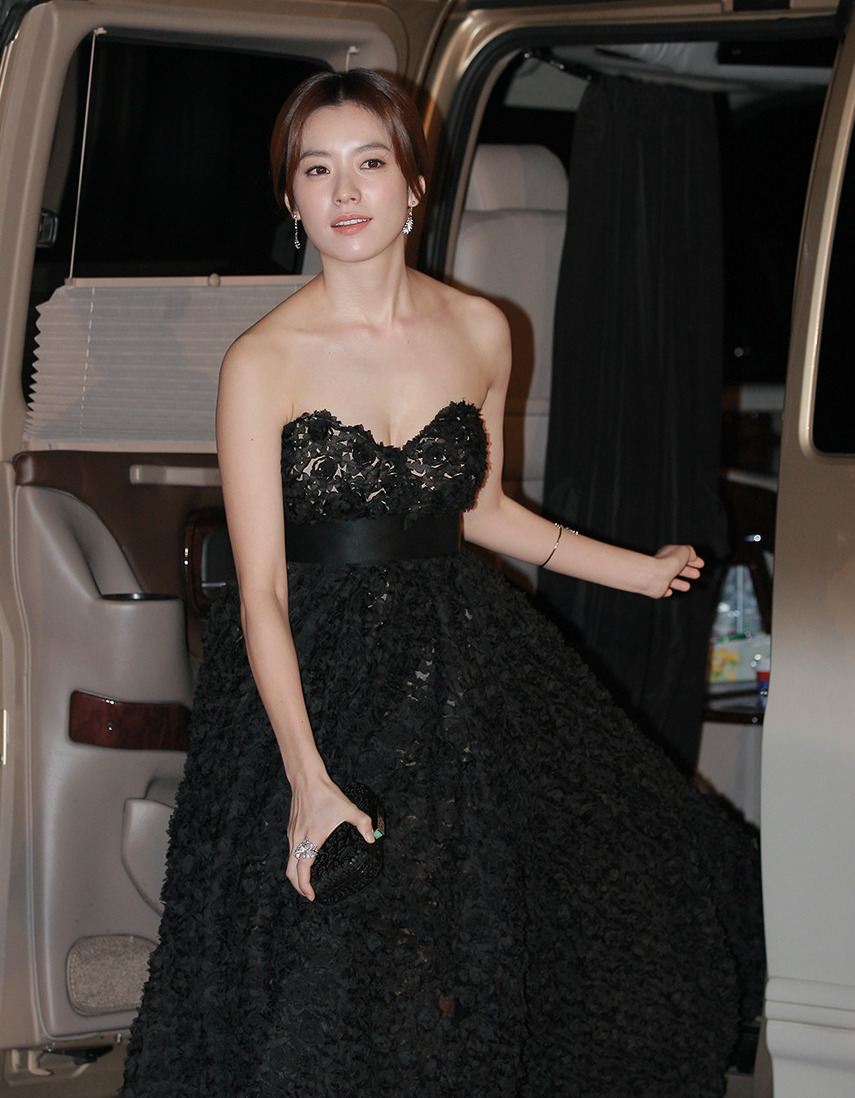
Han at the 34th Blue Dragon Film Awards in November 2013

In 2013, Han starred opposite Sul Kyung-gu and Jung Woo-sung in action thriller Cold Eyes, a remake of the 2007 Hong Kong film Eye in the Sky. The film dominated the box office after its release and became one of the biggest domestic hits of 2013. Han received acting recognition for her performance, winning Best Actress from the Blue Dragon Film Awards and Buil Film Awards.

In 2014, Han and Love 911 costar Go Soo reunited in Myohyangsangwan ("View of Myohyangsan"), which depicts the rendezvous of a South Korean painter and a North Korean waitress in a North Korean restaurant. The short film is a collaboration by contemporary artists Moon Kyung-won and Jeon Joon-ho, and combined a theatrical plot, experimental imagery, dance and performance art.

She then ventured into the overseas market by starring in her first Japanese film, Isshin Inudo's Miracle: Debikuro-kun no Koi to Maho ("Miracle Devil Claus' Love and Magic"). Set during the Christmas season, the film is a love story about a kind bookstore employee (played by Masaki Aiba from J-pop boyband Arashi) who meets three women.

In 2015, Han starred in the musical biopic C'est Si Bon, which depicted the ups and downs of the folk music group Twin Folio, which was active from the 1960s to 80s. Famous for its live performances, C'est Si Bon was the name of a popular music lounge located in Mugyo-dong in the 1970s, where Twin Folio got its start; Han played the group's muse. This was followed by romantic comedy film The Beauty Inside, where Han's character falls in love with a man who changes to different people every day.

Later that year, Han got together with Yoo Yeon-seok and Chun Woo-hee, both of her co-stars in The Beauty Inside, again for Love, Lies, a movie which depicts the last story of gisaeng during the Japanese occupation in the 1940s.

=== 2016–present: Television comeback and American advancement ===
In 2016, Han returned to the small screen with MBC's fantasy suspense series W alongside Lee Jong-suk. Helmed by director Jung Dae-yoon who directed She Was Pretty and writer Song Jae-jung whose previous works include Nine: Nine Time Travels and Queen In-hyun's Man, expectations were high as this marked Han's return to the small screen after 6 years. She won the Top Excellence award at the 5th APAN Star Awards and MBC Drama Awards for her performance in W.

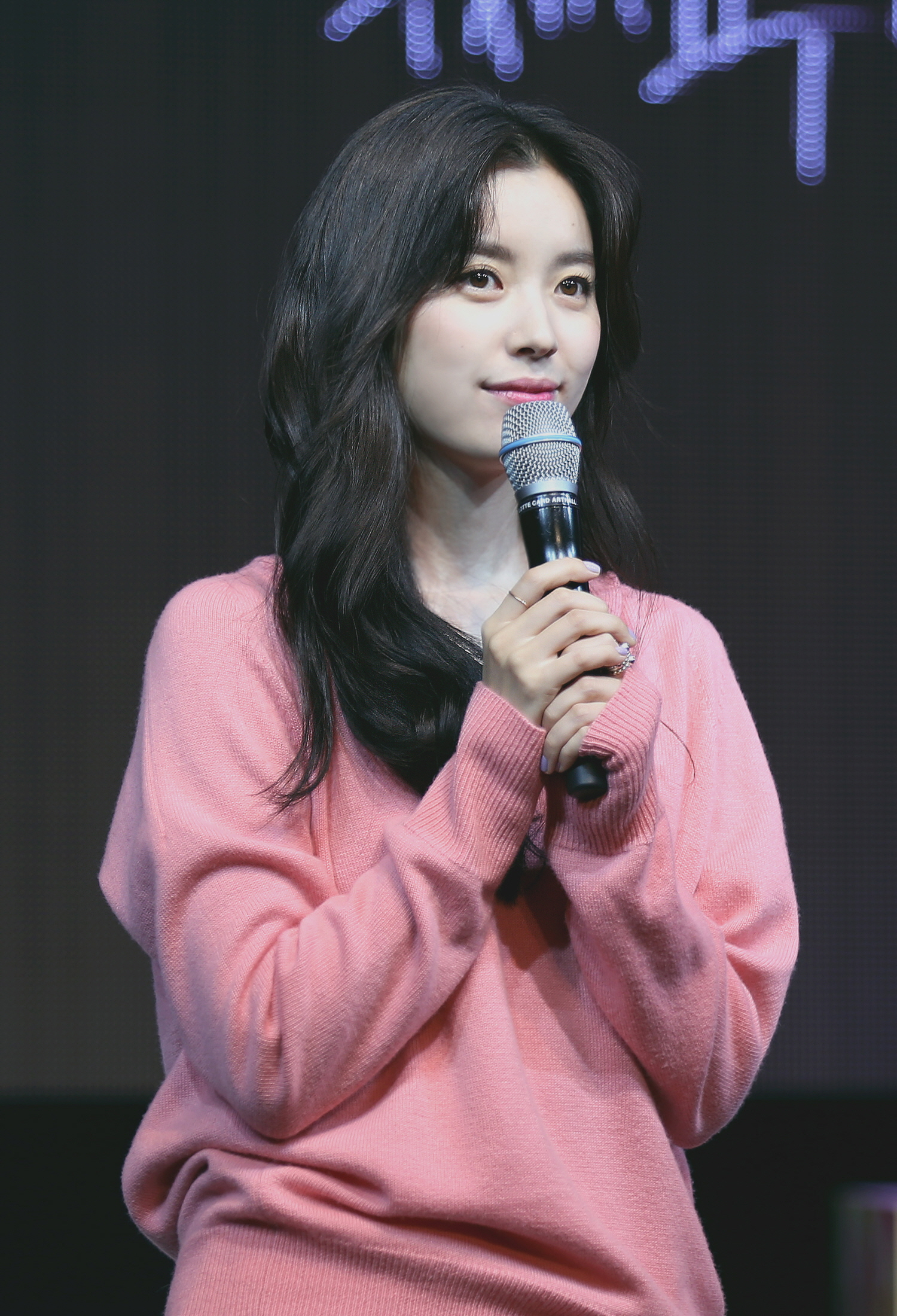
Han in 2017

In 2018, Han starred in the thriller Golden Slumber alongside Kang Dong-won. The same year, she reunited with Kang as the female lead in sci-fi action thriller Illang: The Wolf Brigade, based on the Japanese animated film of the same name.

In 2019, Han was confirmed as part of the main cast of American television series Treadstone, an offshoot from Universal's Bourne franchise.

In 2020, Han was cast in a Japanese action film Taiyō wa Ugokanai ("The Sun Stands Still"), directed by Eiichiro Hasumi. Based on the novel of the same name, Han played an elusive and mysterious spy who travels across the world on adventures whilst hiding her true intentions.

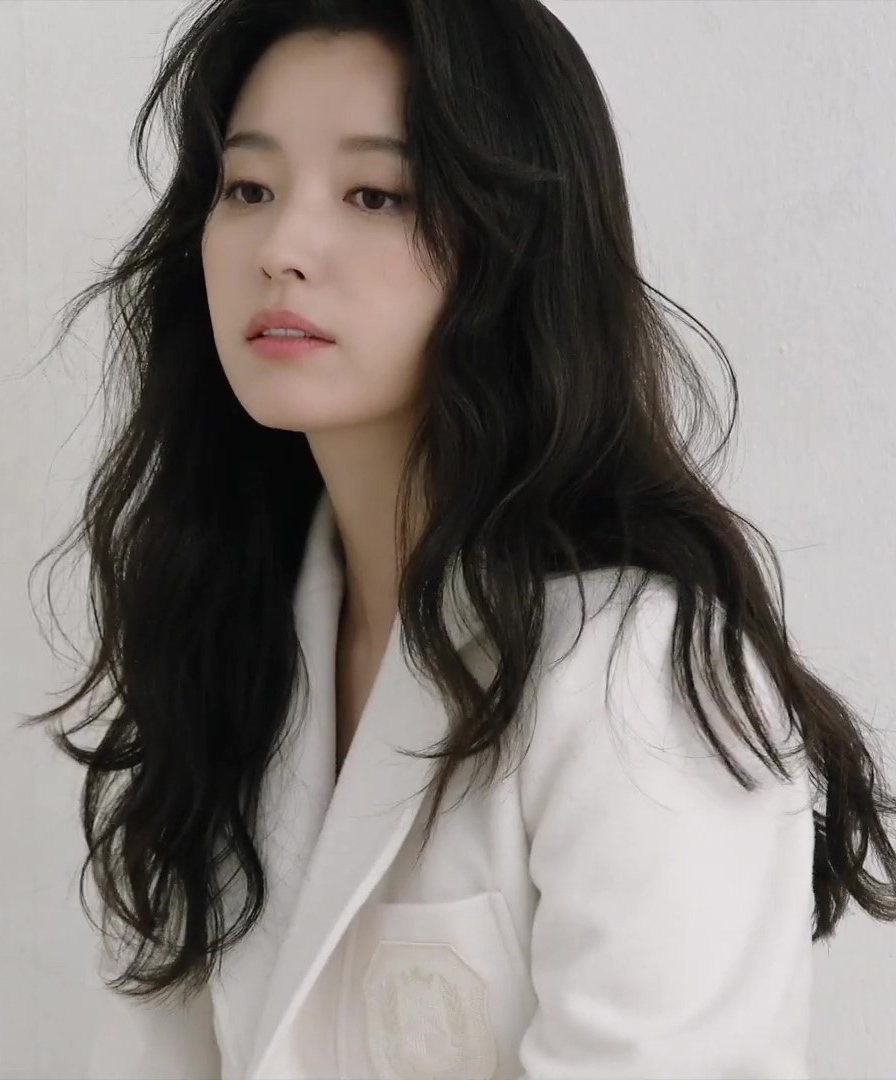
Han in November 2021

In 2021, Han acted as a member of a counter-terrorist squad in the apocalyptic thriller drama Happiness, starring opposite Park Hyung-sik. Directed by Ahn Gil-ho, the drama depicted class discrimination, conflicting human desires and the struggle for survival amongst a group of house-owners in an apartment in Korea due to a mysterious virus outbreak that threatens the livelihood of the inhabitants in a city.

In 2022, Han starred alongside Kang Ha-neul and Lee Kwang-soo in The Pirates: The Last Royal Treasure, the sequel to the 2014 blockbuster The Pirates. She played the role of Hae-rang, the captain of the pirate ship. The film marks her return to Korean cinema after 4 years since Illang: The Wolf Brigade. In October, Han made a special appearance in the film 20th Century Girl, playing the adult version of Kim You-jung's character.

In 2023, Hyo-joo starred in the Disney+ series Moving alongside a star-studded ensemble cast of Ryu Seung-ryong, Zo In-sung, Cha Tae-hyun, Ryoo Seung-bum, Kim Sung-kyun, Lee Jung-ha, Go Youn-jung, and Kim Do-hoon. The drama premiered on August 9, 2023. In November 2023, Han was named the first ever winner of the Best Actress award in the Series Category at the 59th Grand Bell Awards for her role in Moving.

In 2024, she starred in her second Disney+ series Blood Free alongside Ju Ji-hoon, a sci-fi thriller series where she took on the role of a CEO of a biotechnology company that produces artificially cultured meat.

In 2025, she is appearing in her third Japanese-language project, Romantics Anonymous alongside Shun Oguri. This remake of the French romantic comedy film Les Émotifs Anonymes was released on Netflix on October 16, 2025, following its premiere at 30th Busan International Film Festival. Han also served on the seven members Competition jury at the Busan International Film Festival in September.

== Personal life ==
Han is trilingual; she is able to speak fluently in Korean, English, and Japanese. She has displayed her linguistic proficiency in various productions and acting projects across the Korean, Japanese entertainment industry and Hollywood. Han also plays the piano and guitar. She sang and performed both instruments to a live audience of over 2,000 people at her concert fan meeting in Japan.

Additionally, Han is known to like exercising and keeping fit in her spare time. She enjoys a variety of sports including golf, tennis, cycling and running. Her athletic prowess has allowed her to transition seamlessly into more action-heavy acting roles in her thirties, such as Treadstone, The Pirates 2, Happiness and Moving. She has also learnt free-diving as a hobby and took part in the annual World Triathlon Cup in 2023, held in Tongyeong.

Han is an avid dog lover; she has stated that she aspired to become a veterinarian when she was younger. She currently lives with a white Maltese puppy. A Catholic, Han also studied Buddhism for six months.

== Philanthropy ==
In May 2022 on Children's Day, Han donated ₩100 million to Asan Medical Center. It will be used for the cost of treatment such as surgery so that young patients do not miss treatment due to economic burdens. She had also donated ₩50 million in 2021.

In July 2023, Han donated ₩50 million to flood victims via the Hope Bridge Korea Disaster Relief Association. She was quoted as saying, "I can't dare to imagine the sadness of those affected by the sudden heavy rain across the country. I sincerely hope that the flood victims can recover their lives as soon as possible."

In February 2024, the Community Chest of Korea announced that Han had donated ₩50 million to the nonprofit organization on her birthday. She had already donated over ₩100 million to the organization in 2022, and was named a member of the Honor Society. Her donation will be used to support facilities for single mothers and educational programs.

Since 2013, Han has also established the "Hyo-joo Fund" at the Seoul Social Welfare Foundation to support the livelihood of the elderly and cultural experiences for underprivileged children and youth. Her donations to various causes over the years have included the restoration efforts following forest fires in Gangwon Province, disaster relief for COVID-19, and donating her appearance fee from the show Hometown Flex to the New Life Support Center in her hometown of Cheongju.

In June 2026, Han Hyo-joo donated ₩50 million to Join Together Society (JTS), an international humanitarian organization. According to her agency, the donation will be used to support children around the world, including efforts to combat hunger and provide educational opportunities. Han has also participated in charitable activities, including a fundraising campaign organized by JTS in Seoul in May 2026.

== Controversy ==
In November 2013, the Seoul Central District Prosecutors Office indicted Han's ex-manager from her former agency Fantom Entertainment for attempted extortion. According to the police, the ex-manager surnamed Lee and two other men were suspected of threatening Han's family with "photos of her private life". Lee was believed to have stolen the photos from the actress's digital camera when he worked as Han's manager. Lee then threatened to publish the compromising photos unless he and his two accomplices were paid ₩400 million by Han's father. After she informed her father that she had done nothing that could be problematic, he called the police. Han's father worked with the police, helping them locate the blackmailers. It appears they did not have any incriminating photos of the actress. In a press release, Han's agency BH Entertainment said the actress did not engage in any activities that deserve public criticism and threatened "strong measures" to deal with blackmail. The three men who committed the blackmail attempt were ultimately ordered to serve jail time along with probation.

In September 2014, the South Korean media reported that a petition was being circulated to boycott Han's appearance in TV commercials. The petition stemmed from Han's younger brother allegedly bullying a fellow airman while both were in mandatory military service that resulted in the latter's suicide. The negative publicity was exacerbated by Han herself having once been appointed as a goodwill ambassador for the Republic of Korea Air Force.

== Filmography ==
=== Film ===
Year	Title	Role	Notes	Ref.
2006	My Boss, My Teacher	Yoo Mi-jung		
2006	Ad-lib Night	Bo-kyung	Independent film	
2008	Ride Away	Im Ha-jung	Independent film	
2008	My Dear Enemy	Woman at the bus stop / Voice on the phone	Cameo	
2009	Heaven's Postman	Jo Hana / Saki		
2011	Always	Ha Jeong-hwa		
2012	Masquerade	Queen Consort		
2012	Love 911	Go Mi-soo		
2013	Cold Eyes	Ha Yoon-ju		
2014	View of Mount Myohyang	Oh Yeong-ran	Short film	
2014	Miracle: Devil Claus' Love and Magic	Tae So-yeon		
2015	C'est Si Bon	Min Ja-young		
2015	The Beauty Inside	Hong Yi-soo		
2016	Love, Lies	Jung So-yul		
2018	Golden Slumber	Jeon Sun-young		
2018	Illang: The Wolf Brigade	Lee Yoon-hee		
2021	The Sun Does Not Move	Ayako		
2022	The Pirates: The Last Royal Treasure	Hae-rang		
2022	20th Century Girl	Adult Na Bo-ra	Cameo	
2023	Believer 2	Keunkal		

=== Television series ===
Year	Title	Role	Notes	Ref.
2005	Nonstop 5	Han Hyo-joo	Episode 167, 183–257	
2006	Spring Waltz	Seo / Park Eun-young		
2007	Heaven & Earth	Suk Ji-soo		
2008	Iljimae	Eun-chae		
2009	Brilliant Legacy	Go Eun-sung		
2009	Soul Special	Jin Mi-ah	Short drama	
2010	Dong Yi	Dong-yi (later Choi Suk-bin)		
2016	W	Oh Yeon-joo		
2019	Treadstone	So-yun	American series on USA Network	
2021	Dramaworld 2	Park So-yun	Cameo	
2021	Happiness	Yoon Sae-bom		
2023	Moving	Lee Mi-hyun		
2024	Blood Free	Yoon Ja-yu		
2025	Romantics Anonymous	Hana Lee	Japanese drama	

=== Television shows ===
Year	Title	Role	Notes	Ref.
2005–2006	Inkigayo	Host	with Andy	
2016	21st Busan International Film Festival	Host	with Sul Kyung-gu	
2021	On Rent: House on Wheels	Cast member	with the cast of The Pirates: The Last Royal Treasure	

=== Music video appearances ===
Year	Song title	Artist	Album	Ref.
2004	"I Love You" (사랑해요)	Simply Sunday	I Love You	
2005	"Just because you are in this world" (그대가 이 세상에 있는 것만으로도)	Position	Renaissance	
2005	"Paris"	Epik High	Swan Songs	
2005	"Farewell is" (이별은)	U	Farewell is...	
2006	"One Love"	Loveholic	Spring Waltz OST	
2009	"All men are like that" (남잔 다 그래)	Lee Woo-sang	One Fine Day	
2009	"Let's break up" (헤어져)	As One	Love Tonic	
2009	"Two are better" (둘이 더 좋아)	Rumble Fish	Soul Special OST	
2009	"Sudden Burst of Tears" (왈칵 눈물이)	Han Hyo-joo feat. Gan-D of buga kingz	Soul Special OST	
2009	"Unable To Love" (사랑한단 말을 못해서) (ver.1)	K.Will	Soul Special OST	
2010	"Don't You Know"	Han Hyo-joo, No Reply	Han Hyo-joo with GMF 2010	
2010	"Popcorn" (팝콘) (GMF 2010 Lozik RMX)	Daybreak	Han Hyo-joo with GMF 2010	
2012	"Hide and Seek" (숨바꼭질)	Han Hyo-joo, Broccoli, You Too?	Hide and Seek	

== Discography ==
=== Singles ===
Title	Year	Album
"It's the First Time" (처음이었어요)	2005	Nonstop 5 OST
"Ride Away" (달려라 자전거)	2008	Ride Away OST
"Sudden Burst of Tears" (왈칵 눈물이) (Han Hyo-joo feat. Gan-D of buga kingz)	2009	Soul Special OST
"You" (CF ver.)(그대) (Brown Eyed Soul feat. Han Hyo-joo)	2010	You
"Don't You Know" (Han Hyo-joo, No Reply)	2010	Han Hyo-joo with GMF 2010
"8 A.M." (아침 8시) (My-Q feat. Han Hyo-joo)	2011	8 A.M
"Oh Seoul"(오 서울) (M-Q feat. Han Hyo-joo)	2011	8 A.M
"Time for Love" (연애시대) (Lee Seung-gi feat. Ra.D) (narr. Han Hyo-joo)	2011	Time for Love
"Hide and Seek" (숨바꼭질) (with Broccoli, You Too?)	2012	Hide and Seek
"Let us forget" (이젠 잊기로 해요)	2015	C'est Si Bon OST
"I'll Give It All To You" (나 그대에게 모두 드리리) (with Jung Woo)	2015	C'est Si Bon OST
"Love, Lies" (사랑 거즛말이)	2016	Love, Lies OST
"Spring lady" (봄 아가씨) (with Chun Woo-hee)	2016	Love, Lies OST

== Accolades ==
=== Awards and nominations ===
Name of the award ceremony, year presented, category, nominee of the award, and the result of the nomination
Award ceremony	Year	Category	Nominee / Work	Result	Ref.
Andre Kim Best Star Awards	2009	Female Star Award	Han Hyo-joo	Won	
APAN Star Awards	2016	Top Excellence Award, Actress in a Miniseries	W	Won	
APAN Star Awards	2016	Best Couple Award	Han Hyo-joo with Lee Jong-suk	Nominated	
Asian Film Awards	2014	Best Actress	Cold Eyes	Nominated	
Baeksang Arts Awards	2010	Best Actress – Television	Brilliant Legacy	Nominated	
Baeksang Arts Awards	2011	Best Actress – Television	Dong Yi	Won	
Baeksang Arts Awards	2011	Most Popular Actress – Television	Dong Yi	Nominated	
Baeksang Arts Awards	2013	Best Actress – Film	Love 911	Nominated	
Baeksang Arts Awards	2016	Best Actress – Film	The Beauty Inside	Nominated	
Blue Dragon Film Awards	2013	Best Leading Actress	Cold Eyes	Won	
Blue Dragon Film Awards	2015	Best Leading Actress	The Beauty Inside	Nominated	
Blue Dragon Series Awards	2022	Best Leading Actress	Happiness	Nominated	
Blue Dragon Series Awards	2022	Popular Star Award	Happiness	Won	
Blue Dragon Series Awards	2024	Best Actress	Moving	Nominated	
Buil Film Awards	2013	Best Actress	Cold Eyes	Won	
Buil Film Awards	2016	Best Actress	The Beauty Inside	Nominated	
Buil Film Awards	2018	Popular Star Award	Illang: The Wolf Brigade	Nominated	
BIFF with Marie Claire Asia Star Awards	2016	Asia Star Award	Love, Lies, The Beauty Inside	Won	
CETV Asia's Top 10 Popular Star Awards	2012	Hallyu Star Prize	Han Hyo-joo	Won	
Grand Bell Awards	2016	Best Actress	The Beauty Inside	Nominated	
Grand Bell Awards	2023	Best Actress in a Series	Moving	Won	
Hong Kong Cable TV Awards	2011	Dong Yi	Best Actress	Won	
KBS Drama Awards	2006	Best New Actress	Spring Waltz	Nominated	
KBS Drama Awards	2007	Best New Actress	Heaven & Earth	Nominated	
KBS Drama Awards	2007	Popularity Award	Heaven & Earth	Won	
KBS Drama Awards	2007	Best Couple Award	Han Hyo-joo with Park Hae-jin; Heaven & Earth	Won	
Korean Association of Film Critics Awards	2006	Best New Actress	Ad-lib Night	Won	
Korean Association of Film Critics Awards	2013	Best Actress	Cold Eyes	Nominated	
Korea Best Dressed Swan Awards	2007	Best Dressed	Han Hyo-joo	Won	
Korea Drama Awards	2010	Top Excellence Award, Actress	Dong Yi	Won	
Korean Film Actor's Association Star Night - Korea Top Star Awards Ceremony	2015	Top Star Award	The Beauty Inside	Won	
Korea Jewelry Awards	2008	Pearl Award	Han Hyo-joo	Won	
Korea World Youth Film Festival	2013	Favorite Actress	Cold Eyes	Won	
Max Movie Awards	2016	Best Actress	The Beauty Inside	Nominated	
MBC Drama Awards	2010	Grand Prize (Daesang)	Dong Yi	Won	
MBC Drama Awards	2010	Top Excellence Award, Actress	Dong Yi	Nominated	
MBC Drama Awards	2010	Popularity Award	Dong Yi	Won	
MBC Drama Awards	2016	Grand Prize (Daesang)	W	Nominated	
MBC Drama Awards	2016	Top Excellence Award, Actress in a Miniseries	W	Won	
MBC Drama Awards	2016	Best Couple Award	Han Hyo-joo with Lee Jong-suk; W	Won	
Miss Binggrae Smile Pageant	2003	Grand Prize	Han Hyo-joo	Won	
Mnet 20's Choice Awards	2009	Hot Female Drama Star	Brilliant Legacy	Won	
SBS Drama Awards	2008	New Star Award	Iljimae	Won	
SBS Drama Awards	2009	Excellence Award, Actress in a Special Planning Drama	Brilliant Legacy	Won	
SBS Drama Awards	2009	Top 10 Stars	Brilliant Legacy	Won	
SBS Drama Awards	2009	Best Couple Award	Han Hyo-joo with Lee Seung-gi; Brilliant Legacy	Won	
Seoul International Drama Awards	2010	Outstanding Korean Actress	Brilliant Legacy	Won	
Singapore International Film Festival	2007	Best Actress	Ad-lib Night	Won	

=== State honors ===
Name of country, year given, and name of honor
Country Or Organization	Year	Honor Or Award	Ref.
Taxpayers' Day	2011	Presidential Commendation as Honest Taxpayer	

=== Listicles ===
Name of publisher, year listed, name of listicle, and placement
Publisher	Year	Listicle	Placement	Ref.
Forbes	2011	Korea Power Celebrity 40	36th	
Forbes	2012	Korea Power Celebrity 40	30th	
Forbes	2013	Korea Power Celebrity 40	31st	
Forbes	2014	Korea Power Celebrity 40	35th	
Forbes	2017	Korea Power Celebrity 40	38th	
Korean Film Council	2021	Korean Actors 200 (Note: Introduces 200 actors that best represent the present and future of Korean cinema to the people in the film industry all over the world.)	Included	
Moviewalker Press	2024	10 Korean Actors that Movie Writers Recommended in 2024	10th	
