= The Pirates: The Last Royal Treasure =

2022 South Korean action adventure film

- Theatrical release poster
- Hangul: 해적: 도깨비 깃발
- Hanja: 海賊: 도깨비 旗발
- Lit.: The Pirates: Goblin Flag
- RR: Haejeok: dokkaebi gitbal
- MR: Haejŏk: tokkaebi kippal
- Directed by: Kim Jeong-hoon
- Written by: Chun Sung-il
- Starring: Kang Ha-neul; Han Hyo-joo; Lee Kwang-soo; Chae Soo-bin; Oh Se-hun; Kim Sung-oh; Park Ji-hwan; Kwon Sang-woo
- Cinematography: Shin Tae-ho; Kim Young-ho
- Edited by: Kim Chang-ju
- Music by: Hwang Sang-jun
- Production companies: ANEW; Oscar 10 Studio; Lotte Entertainment
- Distributed by: Lotte Entertainment
- Release date: January 26, 2022
- Running time: 126 minutes
- Country: South Korea
- Language: Korean
- Budget: US$19.6 million
- Box office: US$10.3 million

The Pirates: The Last Royal Treasure (Korean: 해적: 도깨비 깃발; lit. 'The Pirates: Goblin Flag') is a 2022 South Korean period adventure film directed by Kim Jeong-hoon and starring Kang Ha-neul, Han Hyo-joo, Lee Kwang-soo, Chae Soo-bin, Oh Se-hun, Kim Sung-oh, Park Ji-hwan, and Kwon Sang-woo. A spiritual sequel of the 2014 film The Pirates, the film is about adventures of pirates who gather in the sea and search for the royal treasures that have disappeared without a trace.

The film was released in IMAX format on January 26, 2022 coinciding with Korean New Year holiday. It also became the first South Korean film to register 1 million viewers in 2022 on the 11th day of its release. The film is available for streaming on Netflix from March 2, 2022.

== Synopsis ==
The story is about Moo-chi (Kang Ha-neul), the head of the bandits, who claims to be the best swordsman in Goryeo, and Hae-rang (Han Hyo-joo), the owner of a pirate ship that conquered the sea. Although they are destined to be together on the same boat, they continue their windless voyage, bumping into each other in the mountains and seas, from birth to opposite extremes. One day, while clearing the pirate ship, they find out that the treasure of the royal family that disappeared without a trace is hidden somewhere, and they set out on a dangerous adventure in search of the largest treasure that will never be seen again in their pirate life. But they weren't the only ones after the missing treasure. Bu Heung-soo (Kwon Sang-woo), a traitor who will do anything to get what he wants, also jumps into the sea to claim the treasure.

== Cast ==
- Kang Ha-neul as Woo Moo-chi, leader of the bandits
- Han Hyo-joo as Hae-rang, captain of the pirate ship
- Lee Kwang-soo as Mak-yi, a pirate king wannabe
- Kwon Sang-woo as Bu Heung-soo, treasure-seeking rebel
- Chae Soo-bin as Hae-geum, a born con artist
- Oh Se-hun as Han-goong, an ace archer
- Kim Sung-oh as Kang-seop, Moo Chi's right-hand man
- Park Ji-hwan as Akwi, stone-fisted maw of the pirates.
- Park Hoon as Mangcho, a subordinate of the rebel Bu Heung-soo who fights against the pirates in pursuit of treasure
- Kim Ki-doo as Gomchi, a member of the Dan-ju Haerang Pirates
- Sung Dong-il as merchant
- Kim Sang-kyung

== Production ==
=== Development ===
In December 2018, the production of sequel to 2014 film The Pirates was announced. The film is directed by Kim Jeong-hoon, originally scheduled for the return of Kim Nam-gil and Son Ye-jin, and was expected to start filming in June 2019. In March 2019, Lee Kwang-soo joined the cast replacing Yoo Hae-jin, the member of original film cast. Due to various reasons and schedule conflicts of main leads, the filming was cancelled in May 2019. It took another ten months for producers to modify the script, cast the actors, and start the film with a new story.

=== Casting ===
In March 2020 it was reported that Kang Ha-neul was considering to appear in the film. Han Hyo-joo reunited with Kang Ha-Neul, as she confirmed her casting in the film, marking her return to cinema after two years since Illang: The Wolf Brigade. In April 2020, Chae Soo-bin joined the cast of the film. In June 2020 the cast line-up of the film was completed and filming was planned to start in July.

=== Filming ===
Filming began in July 2020, and concluded in January 2021. In September 2020, a staff member of the special effects team was tested positive for COVID-19, but other members were found negative. Previously the schedule was also delayed due to the rainy season.

The film was produced with an estimated cost of ₩23.5 billion.

== Release ==
The film was originally scheduled to be released in the summer of 2021. The release date was pushed back to the Chuseok festival holidays, but was postponed due to the COVID-19 in South Korea. On October 29, 2021, it was announced that it will be theatrically released during the 2022 Korean New Year holiday. The film was released in IMAX format on January 26, 2022. On January 21, it was also released in 4DX, Superflex G, Superflex, Super 4D, and Dolby Atmos formats in 3 theatres.

The film was made available for streaming globally on Netflix from March 2, 2022.

== Reception ==
=== Box office ===
The film was released on 1,703 screens on January 26, 2022. As per Korean Film Council (Kofic) integrated computer network, the film opened at no 1 place with 120,025 admissions on the Korean box office. It maintained its no 1 position at the Korean box office for consecutive 14 days after its release by gathering 1,122,499 cumulative admissions.

As of September 10, 2022 it is at 10th place among all the Korean films released in the year 2022, with gross of US$10.31 million and 1,339,242 admissions.

=== Critical response ===
The review aggregator website Rotten Tomatoes reported a 60% approval rating, based on 5 reviews with an average rating of 6/10.

Kim Na-young writing for MK Sports termed the film as "spectacular adventures of pirates", and praised the performance of actors writing, "The actors' performances are also flawless." Kim found the story of the film "obvious" but not "boring". When comparing it with previous film Kim said, "It's the second story, which is not a continuation story, but another work." Concluding, Kim stated, "If you have seen the first movie, it will be fun to compare and watch, and if you see this film, it is fun to look for the first story again." Kim Hyun-soo of Cine21 comparing the film with previous version The Pirates (2014) wrote, "The harmonious combination of naval battles and intense ground battles that have increased so much is the exclusive highlight of this series. Praising performances of the cast and action sequences Kim stated, "The action of the three-way composition created by Kang Ha-neul, Han Hyo-joo, and Kwon Sang-woo is enough to attract attention."

Johnny Loftus of Decider reviewing the series praised the performance of Han Hyo-joo writing "[she] is a revelation as the bold and courageous Captain Hae-rang." Concluding Loftus wrote, "Sword Fights on the decks of ships? Treasure maps? Mysterious islands shrouded by fearsome storms? The Pirates: The Last Royal Treasure has it all, and a charismatic cast to boot."

== Accolades ==
Year	Award	Category	Recipient(s)	Result	Ref.
2022	58th Baeksang Arts Awards	Best Technical Award (VFX)	Kang Jong-ik, Seo Byung-cheol	Nominated	
2022	58th Grand Bell Awards	Best Costume Design	Kwon Yoo-jin, Lee Ae-ran	Nominated	
2022	58th Grand Bell Awards	Best Visual Effects	Lee Seong-min	Nominated	
