= Love Again (TV series) =

2012 South Korean television series

- Promotional poster
- Hangul: 러브 어게인
- RR: Reobeu eogein
- MR: Rŏbŭ ŏgein
- Genre: Drama; Romance
- Developed by: Lee Soo-young
- Written by: Kim Eun-hee
- Directed by: Hwang In-roi
- Starring: Kim Ji-soo; Ryu Jung-han; Choi Cheol-ho; Lee Ah-hyun
- Country of origin: South Korea
- Original language: Korean
- No. of episodes: 16

Production
- Executive producer: Bang Jin-ho
- Running time: 70 minutes
- Production company: Drama House

Original release
- Network: JTBC
- Release: April 25 – June 14, 2012

Love Again (Korean: 러브 어게인) is a 2012 South Korean television series starring Kim Ji-soo, Ryu Jung-han, Choi Cheol-ho and Lee Ah-hyun. It is a remake of the 2010 Japanese television series Class Reunion: Love Again Syndrome. The series aired on JTBC from April 25 to June 14, 2012.

== Synopsis ==
At the reunion of an astronomy club, friends meet again for the first time in 30 years. As they recall their golden days, they start having feelings for each other.

== Cast ==
=== Main ===
- Kim Ji-soo as Im Ji-hyun
- Ryu Jung-han as Seo Young-wook
- Choi Cheol-ho as Lee Tae-jin
- Lee Ah-hyun as Kim Mi-hee

=== Supporting ===
- Kim Jin-geun as Kim Woo-chul
- Yoon Ye-hee as Park Seon-joo
- Oh Jae-ik as Yang Jong-ha
- Jeon No-min as Jung Seon-gyu
- Yoo Tae-woong as Jung Jae-gyu
- Kim So-hyun as Jung Yoo-ri
- Kang Yi-seok as Jung Yoo-joon
- Jeon Hye-soo as Oh Soo-jin
- Lee In-sung as Seo Min-jae
- Kim Do-yeon as Ms. Jung
- Yoon Da-gyeong as Nam Si-yeong

== Ratings ==
In this table, the blue numbers represent the lowest ratings and the red numbers represent the highest ratings.

Ep.	Original broadcast date	Average audience share (AGB Nielsen)
Ep.	Original broadcast date	Nationwide
1	April 25, 2012	1.509%
2	April 26, 2012	1.159%
3	May 2, 2012	1.570%
4	May 3, 2012	1.064%
5	May 9, 2012	1.157%
6	May 10, 2012	0.981%
7	May 16, 2012	1.237%
8	May 17, 2012	1.043%
9	May 23, 2012	1.208%
10	May 24, 2012	1.245%
11	May 30, 2012	1.108%
12	May 31, 2012	1.385%
13	June 6, 2012	1.041%
14	June 7, 2012	1.301%
15	June 13, 2012	0.866%
16	June 14, 2012	0.974%
Average		1.178%

- This drama airs on a cable channel/pay TV which normally has a relatively smaller audience compared to free-to-air TV/public broadcasters (KBS, SBS, MBC and EBS).
