= This Charming Girl =

- Theatrical poster
- Hangul: 여자, 정혜
- RR: Yeoja, Jeonghye
- MR: Yŏja, Chŏnghye
- Directed by: Lee Yoon-ki
- Written by: Lee Yoon-ki
- Produced by: Lee Seung-jae
- Starring: Kim Ji-soo; Hwang Jung-min
- Cinematography: Choi Jin-woong
- Edited by: Hahm Sung-won; Kim Hyeong-ju
- Music by: Lee Yeong-ho; Lee So-yeon
- Production companies: LJ Film; CJ Entertainment
- Distributed by: Showbox
- Release dates: 10 October 2004 (Busan International Film Festival); 10 March 2005 (South Korea)
- Running time: 98 minutes
- Country: South Korea
- Language: Korean
- Box office: US$223,910

This Charming Girl (Korean: 여자, 정혜; lit. 'Female, Jeong-hae') is a 2005 South Korean drama film written and directed by Lee Yoon-ki.

== Plot ==
Jeong-hae's life is as monotonous as her job at the post office. Her apartment, which is not far from where she works, is filled with things she has bought through the home shopping network; only a stray cat waits to greet her each day. On Sunday afternoons, she sits on her veranda with her cat listening to children play below; she loves this time the most. In her life, this is probably the most peaceful time. Jeong-hae's childhood memories include her mother with a pencil in one hand and a cigarette in the other, quietly drawing and writing. It is a memory still hard for her to handle, for her mother's sudden death left a deep scar. When it feels like only memories are taking over her life, she cannot hold back her tears. However, one day a love that moves her heart appears: "Tonight, would you have dinner with me at my place?" Slowly, something starts growing once again in her heart. She is at last hopeful that she could be happy.

== Cast ==
- Kim Ji-soo as Jeong-hae
- Hwang Jung-min as Writer
- Kim Hye-ok as Mother
- Lee Dae-yeon as Uncle
- Lee Geum-ju as Aunt
- Kim Mi-seong as Colleague 1
- Lee Mi-mi as Colleague 2
- Kim Jung-ki as Manager
- Seo Dong-won as Sad man
- Park Sung-woong as Ex-husband
- Kim Kkot-bi as young Jeong-hae

== Awards and nominations ==
2004 Pusan International Film Festival

- Winner - New Currents Award

2005 Berlin International Film Festival

- Winner - NETPAC Award

2005 Deauville Asian Film Festival

- Winner - Lotus Jury Prize

2005 Sundance Film Festival

- Nomination - Grand Jury Prize

2005 Singapore International Film Festival

- Winner - Best Director (Lee Yoon-ki)
- Winner - Best Actress (Kim Ji-soo)

2005 Baeksang Arts Awards

- Nomination - Best New Actress (Kim Ji-soo)

2005 Grand Bell Awards

- Nomination - Best New Director (Lee Yoon-ki)
- Nomination - Best New Actress (Kim Ji-soo)

2005 Blue Dragon Film Awards

- Winner - Best New Actress (Kim Ji-soo)
- Nomination - Best New Director (Lee Yoon-ki)

2005 Korean Film Awards

- Winner - Best New Actress (Kim Ji-soo)

2005 Busan Film Critics Awards

- Winner - Best New Actress (Kim Ji-soo)

== See also ==
- List of Korean-language films
