= Lee Yoon-ki =

South Korean filmmaker (born 1965)

- Born: 1965 (age 60–61); Daejeon, South Korea
- Education: University of Southern California - MA in Business Administration/Economics
- Occupations: Film director, screenwriter

Korean name
- Hangul: 이윤기
- RR: I Yungi
- MR: I Yun'gi

Lee Yoon-ki (Korean: 이윤기; born 1965), is a South Korean film director and screenwriter.

== Career ==
Lee Yoon-ki earned his MA in business administration/economics at the University of Southern California. After returning to Korea, he worked as a producer and director of several short films. His first feature, This Charming Girl, attracted much attention from major film festivals, including Sundance and Berlin. His second feature, Love Talk, was invited to compete at the Karlovy Vary International Film Festival, and his third and fourth features, Ad-lib Night and My Dear Enemy were both critically acclaimed.

Since his debut, Lee has emerged as one of Korea's leading sources of small-budgeted, intimate dramas about ordinary people. He is particularly known for inhabiting the worlds of female characters, and he has worked with a range of up and coming actresses including Kim Ji-soo, Han Hyo-joo and Im Soo-jung, and one of Korea's top actress Jeon Do-yeon.

He considers Hou Hsiao-hsien as his film mentor. Other influences are Robert Altman’s earlier works, Woody Allen, Martin Scorsese, and other American independent films from the 70s and 80s, including the Coen brothers’ Blood Simple. His favorite artist is Edward Hopper.

== Filmography ==
- This Charming Girl (여자, 정혜), 2004
- Love Talk (러브토크), 2005
- Ad-lib Night (아주 특별한 손님), 2006
- My Dear Enemy (멋진 하루), 2008
- Come Rain, Come Shine (사랑한다, 사랑하지 않는다), 2011
- A Man and a Woman (남과 여), 2016
- One Day (어느날), 2017

== Awards and nominations ==
This Charming Girl

- NETPAC Award - 2005, Berlin International Film Festival
- New Currents Award - 2005, Pusan International Film Festival
- Grand Jury Prize, World Cinema (Dramatic) - 2005, Sundance Film Festival

Love Talk

- Crystal Globe - 2005, Karlovy Vary International Film Festival (Nominated)
