= Love Talk =

- Film poster
- Hangul: 러브토크
- RR: Reobeutokeu
- MR: Rŏbŭt'ok'ŭ
- Directed by: Lee Yoon-ki
- Written by: Lee Yoon-ki
- Produced by: Danielle Na
- Starring: Bae Jong-ok; Park Jin-hee; Park Hee-soon
- Cinematography: Choi Jin-woong
- Production company: LJ Film
- Distributed by: CJ Entertainment
- Release date: November 11, 2005
- Running time: 118 minutes
- Countries: South Korea; United States
- Languages: English; Korean

Love Talk (Korean: 러브토크) is the second film by South Korean director Lee Yoon-ki. It tells the story of a group of expatriated South Koreans trying to adapt to living in the Los Angeles area. The film was shot entirely on location in California with Korean and American actors.

== Awards ==
- Lee Yoon-ki - Crystal Globe, 2005 Karlovy Vary International Film Festival (Nominated)
