= Park Hee-jung =

Park Hee-jung may refer to:

- Park Hee-jung (golfer)
- Park Hee-jung (actress)
