= 자두 =

자두 may refer to:

- Choi Ja-doo, character in the animated series Hello Jadoo
- Cylinder head in Korean-language
- The Jadu, South Korean modern rock band
  - Jadu (real name Kim Deok Eun; born 1982), leader of The Jadu
- Plum, character in South Korean film Four Toes
- Plum, character in South Korean film Red Carpet
- Prunus salicina in Korean-language
