= Protests against Samsung =

Samsung, a Korean electronics company, began producing semiconductors in 1974 and has grown to become one of the largest semiconductor fabricators in the world. In the decades following Samsung's entrance into semiconductor fabrication, many of its workers developed serious illnesses, including leukemia, lymphoma, and multiple sclerosis (MS). Beginning in 2007, the families of the impacted workers, with the help of a variety of domestic and international organizations, organized and mobilized against Samsung in the form of various protests and legal challenges. This organized opposition lasted for over a decade and largely concluded upon the signing of a binding settlement agreement between Samsung and the relevant opposition leader. Additionally, Samsung issued a public apology and acceptance responsibility for causing an increased risk of serious illness in its semiconductor factories.

== Background ==
Samsung first entered the semiconductor fabrication business in 1974 by acquiring Korea Semiconductors. By 1993, Samsung was the world's largest producer of memory chips, and it has retained that title ever since.

The semiconductor fabrication process necessitates the use of a variety of carcinogenic substances. At various points in the process, workers are required to dip components in liquid baths, utilize X-ray radiation, and engage in various other production techniques that expose them to potentially harmful substances.

In the 1980s and 1990s, the semiconductor industry was subject a variety of criticisms for creating potential health hazards in their fabrication facilities. A number of Samsung's US-based competitors were found to have statistically greater serious illness incidence rates among their semiconductor workforces, which led to increased monitoring, safety standards, and protection for semiconductor workers in the US and many other countries. Samsung, however, has historically declined to release the relevant health data and information on the environment in its semiconductor plants. This decision has been facilitated by the South Korean government's regulations protecting trade secrets that have allowed the company to withhold relevant information, such as the types of chemicals used in semiconductor production, despite numerous attempts to have it made public.

Studies and reports released decades after Samsung's entry into semiconductor fabrication showed that the company has a long history of questionable health and safety practices. It was discovered that Samsung semiconductor workers' exposure to radiation was significantly beyond the acceptable levels recognized by US regulators. Moreover, it was found that Samsung neglected to actually check the chemical composition of substances used in its semiconductor fabrication process, and that the company failed to conduct exposure assessments for 71% of substances utilized in production. Other investigations suggested the company continued to use harmful substances even after stating it would no longer use them. For example, internal documents showed that Samsung was using TCE, a common cleaning solvent, as recently as 2010 despite the company publicly stating it had not been a part of the fabrication process since 1995.

As such, there have been a great deal of cases of serious illness being developed in Samsung's manufacturing workforce over the decades after it first entered the semiconductor market. However, prior to the organization of an opposition movement, no court in South Korea had ordered Samsung to pay compensation for causing illness in any of its workers.

== Death of Hwang Yu-mi and beginnings of opposition movement ==
On March 6, 2007, Hwang Yu-mi, a 21-year-old woman working Samsung's Giheung semiconductor plant, died from leukemia. She began working at Samsung in 2003 as an operator on one of the assembly lines. She initially worked on the diffusion process, which involves exposure to carcinogenic substances like benzene, and later began working on the "wet etching" process, which involves repeatedly dipping components in chemical baths. In October 2005 she began complaining about fits of dizziness and nausea, so the factory's infirmary physicians sent her to the hospital where she was diagnosed with acute myeloid leukemia. She began chemotherapy treatment and after additional treatment her cancer went into remission in the summer of 2006. Despite this, Yu-mi relapsed in January 2007 and died three months later.

=== Hwang Sang-ki ===
Yu-mi's father, Hwang Sang-ki, believed there could be a connection between Yu-mi's work and her illness. Sang-ki subsequently informed Samsung of his intent to file a worker's compensation claim in early 2007 in an attempt to receive help with his daughter's increasing medical expenses, but was met with resistance by Samsung. According to Sang-ki, in a meeting with a group of the company's relevant managers he was met with hostility and complete denial of any link between Samsung and his daughter's condition. Soon after his daughter's death, Sang-ki was informed by Samsung that he and his family would receive no compensation. Despite this, Sang-ki firmly believed there was a connection between the working conditions at Samsung's semiconductor plant and the death of his daughter, so he began his own efforts to investigate and prove his theory.

In June 2007, Sang-ki filed a compensation claim with the Korean Workers Compensation and Welfare Service (KCOMWEL). This was the first such claim for a semiconductor worker ever filed with KCOMWEL. In an attempt to build support for his claim, Sang-ki contacted a variety of parties he thought could potentially have some sort of information on the conditions of Yu-mi's workplace and whether other workers at the Giheung factory had developed illnesses, but was often denied access to information and was unsuccessful in gathering useful information. It was during this process that Sang-ki was introduced to a labor activist and attorney named Lee Jong-ran, who was aware of miscarriages in semiconductor workers at Samsung. Together, Sang-ki and Jong-ran were able to procure funds from a number of interested groups to form an organization dedicated to investigating and fighting the lack of compensation and public information on Samsung's role in the illnesses of its semiconductor workers.

=== Banolim/SHARPS ===
The organization created by Hwang Sang-ki and Lee Jong-ran was called Banolim, translated as Supporters for Health and Rights of People in Semiconductor Industry (SHARPS). In addition to promoting and supporting a strategy of non-violent demonstration, Banolim helped families follow Sang-ki's example of filing compensation claims with KCOMWEL and funded their legal challenges. In an effort to demonstrate the prevalence of situations similar to that of Hwang Sang-ki and his family, SHARPS also began a project of collecting and publicizing information on current and former Samsung workers who had contracted serious illnesses. Banolim worked with both domestic and international groups to compile as much data as possible on the incidence of serious diseases in semiconductor workers; Banolim has thus far been able to document 320 cases of work-related diseases reported by Samsung's semiconductor workers and 118 deaths.

== Legal victories of the opposition ==
In 2009, Sang-ki's compensation claim, along with those of a number of other Banolim-supported families, was rejected by KCOMWEL. The agency claimed that it was unable to establish a link between Samsung and the incidence of illness in the workers, although it did not publicize the raw data used in its statistical analyses. In response, Sang-ki filed an appeal of the agency's decision in the South Korean courts and the appeal was merged with that of other families of impacted Samsung workers whose claims were similarly denied by KCOMWEL. KCOMWEL's defense against the appeal was funded not only by Samsung but by the government as well. Soon after the appeal was filed, there was a leak of internal documents from Samsung that contained a non-public list of chemicals utilized in tasks like those assigned to Hwang Yu-mi.

=== First appeal ruling (2011) ===
In 2011, the South Korean courts overturned KCOMWEL's decision and ruled in favor of Sang-ki's and another families claim for compensation, although it rejected the claims of a few other families. The court ordered a government compensation fund, which was paid into by South Korean corporations including Samsung. This marked a very significant moment for Banolim and the opposition movement, as a government court had formally stated that Samsung played a role in the illnesses developed by many of its semiconductor workers.

==== Responses by Samsung and Banolim ====
In response to the reversal of KCOMWEL's decision by the courts, Samsung hired the consulting firm Environ to examine the conditions of its semiconductor fabrication facilities. The report given to Samsung by Environ asserted there was no link between the company and its workers' maladies; thus, Samsung refused to take responsibility despite the court's ruling. There was also no public apology to the families from Samsung following the ruling.

Following their legal victory, Banolim and its supporters focused on urging KCOMWEL not to further appeal the court's decision, thus delaying the restitution process even further. From July 5 to July 7, protesters conducted a sit-in in the KCOMWEL office building in an effort to pressure the agency into not appealing. After meeting with the Chair of KCOMWEL, the protesters disbanded in order to wait for a decision.

On July 12, it was made public that KCOMWEL had decided to appeal the decision of the court. Following the news, protesters resumed their sit-in both outside and inside the KCOMWEL offices to try to force a withdrawal of the appeal, as well as public release of the Environ report and the raw data used.

=== KCOMWEL appeal ruling and Samsung apology (2014) ===
Despite KCOMWEL's appeal, the South Korean courts upheld the ruling to reverse the original KCOMWEL decision denying compensation. Soon after the ruling was handed down Samsung publicly apologized and promised to provide compensation (separate from KCOMWEL funds) to its workers and surviving families of those who developed serious illnesses. However, Samsung also made clear that it does not acknowledge any claims linking the company's semiconductor production processes to serious illnesses as legitimate.

Following the ruling, Samsung set up a compensation fund of 100 billion won (~US$88 million) and invited Banolim to participate in negotiations over how to administer the funds.

== Representation in popular culture ==
The movement initiated by Hwang Sang-ki and Banolim against Samsung garnered significant public attention in the years following its initiation. In 2010, South Korea's largest TV station, KBS, nationally televised a report of the protests and opposition led by Sang-ki and Banolim. This prompted an increase not only in public attention but in the number of claims filed with KCOMWEL.

Public attention greatly increased after the success of Sang-ki's appeal of the KCOMWEL decision. For example, soon after the decision a documentary about the conditions in Samsung's semiconductor facilities and the stories of Hwang Sang-ki, as well as other families, began production. Titled The Empire of Shame, the documentary was shown at film festivals in South Korea, as well as other countries.

=== Another Promise (2014) ===
Another film also began production after the successful appeal in 2011. Also released in 2014, Another Promise is a fictional movie entirely based on Hwang Sang-ki's struggle against Samsung. The movie focuses on Hang Sang-gu after the death of his daughter, Han Yoon-mi. Illustrating the popular support for Hwang Sang-ki's efforts, the movie was the first in South Korean history to be produced using only crowd funded money. Over 7,000 people and roughly a hundred small firms contributed approximately 1.3 billion won towards the production of the movie. The film's initial title was "Another Family," which is a reference to one of Samsung's previous slogans, but it was later changed by the filmmaker.

== Sit-in at Samsung HQ (2015-2018) ==
In October 2015, protesters led and organized by Hwang Sang-ki and Banolim initiated a non-violent sit-in protest beneath Samsung's headquarters in Seoul. The protesters conducted public memorials and candlelight rallies in order to attract further attention. Also present during the protests was a papier-mâché figure of Hwang Yu-mi, making reference to the origins of this instance of organized opposition against Samsung.

The catalyst for the sit-in was the breakdown of talks between Samsung and Banolim over the administration of the compensation fund set up by Samsung after its 2014 apology. Despite hearing the conditions of Banolim and the impacted families, Samsung ultimately imposed a compensation framework that, at least in Banolim's opinion, was not acceptable to the families of its workers.

Lacking a response from Samsung, the sit-in went on for over 1,000 days and garnered a great deal of attention. The protesters also created a shrine to the Samsung workers who died after working in semiconductor fabrication. Roughly ten months into the sit-in, the UN Special Rapporteur on Human Rights and Hazardous Materials publicly questioned the South Korean government for withholding relevant information from the families of Samsung workers and spoke out against Samsung's treatment of its workers in semiconductor plants. On the 600th day of the protest, the Secretary-General of the International Trade Union Confederation (ITUC) visited the protest site to support their cause and raised the issue in a meeting with President Moon Jae the following day. A few months later, the ITUC published a report titled "Samsung - Modern Tech, Medieval Conditions" as a part of its "End Corporate Greed" campaign.

On the 776th day of the sit-in, which coincided with the ten-year anniversary of the creation of Banolim, a widely covered press conference was held with Banolim and activists from more than 100 other groups during which they once again called for Samsung to take responsibility and fairly compensate the workers' families. In July 2018, 1,000 protesters joined and formed a ring around the Samsung HQ to commemorate the 1,000th day of the sit-in protest. Less than a month after this, Samsung contacted Banolim to reinitiate compensation discussions and the company agreed to enter into binding mediation.

== Agreement between Samsung and protesters (2018) ==
In October 2018, the binding mediation process yielded a signed agreement between Samsung and Banolim. The President and CEO of Samsung Device Solutions issued a public apology in which he conceded that Samsung had not properly protected its workers against health risks and that the company had not responded to the issues in a timely enough manner.

Under the agreement, Samsung committed to pay 150 million won to each of its current and former workers upon the condition that they are found to have illnesses due to work-related exposure to dangerous substances. The agreement also extends to contractors employed by Samsung and those who suffered miscarriages. All current and former employees and contractors that have worked in Samsung's semiconductor fabrication facilities since 1984 are eligible to apply for compensation under the agreement and Samsung has committed to compensating all the impacted parties by 2028.

In response to the apology, Hwang Sang-ki stated, "No apology would be enough given the deception and humiliation we experienced from Samsung over the past 11 years, the pain of losing loved ones," but indicated he was pleased at the successful effort to procure adequate compensation.

== National Samsung Electronics Union Strike (2024) ==
The National Samsung Electronics Union asked all of its members to take a PTO day on June 7, 2024, in the first-ever labor strike at the Samsung conglomerate in its 55-year history. Industry experts predict that a full-scale strike would have wide-reaching economic impacts and global supply-chain issues. Union representatives cited Samsung's "disregard for workers" as the primary reason for the strike. The union then announced a three-day strike from July 8–10, 2024. The union called for greater transparency in Samsung's performance-based bonus system and for an extra day of annual leave. On the third day of the strike, the union announced that the strike would continue indefinitely, accusing Samsung management of refusing to negotiate with its demands. The strike ended on August 1, 2024, under institutional pressure and falling numbers, though the union said it intended to continue fighting for its demands with other tactics.

== See also ==
- Samsung and unions
