= Hee-jung =

- Hangul: 희정
- RR: Huijeong
- MR: Hŭijŏng

Hee-jung, also spelled Hui-jeong, is a Korean given name.

People with this name include:

- Ahn Hee-jung (born 1965), South Korean politician
- Kim Hee-jung (actress, born 1970), South Korean actress
- Kim Hee-jeong (fencer) (born 1975), South Korean fencer
- Joo Hee-jung (born 1977), South Korean basketball player
- Park Hee-jung (golfer) (born 1980), South Korean golfer
- Son Hee-jung (born 1987), South Korean road and track cyclist
- Park Hee-jung (actress) (born 1988), South Korean actress
- Kim Hee-jung (actress, born 1992), South Korean actress
- Moon Hee-jung, South Korean screenwriter

== See also ==
- List of Korean given names
