= Blue (2003 film) =

2003 South Korean war film

- Theatrical poster
- Hangul: 블루
- RR: Beullu
- MR: Pŭllu
- Directed by: Lee Jung-gook
- Written by: Kim Hae-gon; Kang Je-gyu
- Produced by: Choe Hyeon-muk; Choe Jin-hwa
- Starring: Shin Hyun-joon; Shin Eun-kyung; Kim Young-ho
- Cinematography: Choi Gi-youl; Seo Geun-hui
- Edited by: Park Gok-ji
- Music by: Choe Tae-hwan
- Release date: 7 February 2003
- Running time: 108 minutes
- Country: South Korea
- Language: Korean
- Budget: $5 million
- Box office: US$997,715

Blue (Korean: 블루) is a 2003 South Korean war film directed by Lee Jung-gook focusing on elite rescue divers of the South Korea Navy. The film attracted 61,223 admissions in the nation's capital, Seoul.

== Plot ==
Two friends in the South Korean navy, Lee and Kim are both part of an elite diving squad, specializing in emergency deep sea salvage dives. Lee is strait-laced and takes his duties seriously, while Kim treats the Navy as a lark. When Kang, a diving instructor and Kim's former girlfriend, is posted to the unit, this creates tension between the friends as they compete for Kang's affections. The tension is heightened when Lee is promoted ahead of Kim, creating a rivalry between the two. Kim's gung-ho approach to diving, and the danger he poses for himself (and his fellow divers), leads to further problems. Matters come to a head when an incident at sea causes the sinking of a submarine, requiring the unit to attempt a dangerous salvage rescue of the sunken submarine.

== Cast ==
- Shin Hyun-joon as Kim Jun
- Shin Eun-kyung as Kang Su-jin
- Kim Young-ho as Lee Tae-hyeon

== See also ==
- Cinema of Korea
