= City of Fathers =

- Film poster
- Hangul: 부산
- Hanja: 父山
- RR: Busan
- MR: Pusan
- Directed by: Park Ji-won
- Written by: Park Ji-won
- Produced by: Kim Sang-oh; Park Ji-won; David Cho
- Starring: Kim Young-ho; Ko Chang-seok; Yoo Seung-ho
- Cinematography: Kim Yun-su
- Edited by: Seo Yong-deok
- Music by: Choi Seung-hyun
- Production company: Sponge Ent.
- Distributed by: Sidus FNH
- Release date: October 15, 2009
- Running time: 101 minutes
- Country: South Korea
- Language: Korean
- Box office: $1 million

City of Fathers (Korean: 부산) is a 2009 South Korean crime drama film written and directed by Park Ji-won.

== Plot ==
Kang-soo is a third-rate street thug in Busan; he's an alcoholic and gambling addict who's always on the run from loan sharks. But when his rebellious teenage son Jong-chul is diagnosed with kidney cancer, he tries to be a real parent for the first time and seeks out Jong-chul's biological father, Tae-suk, a pimp. Tae-suk, however, refuses to help.

== Cast ==
- Kim Young-ho as Jo Tae-suk
- Ko Chang-seok as Kim Kang-soo
- Yoo Seung-ho as Kim Jong-chul
- Cho Jin-woong as Han Sang-goo
- Jung Sun-kyung as Lee Seon-hwa / Eun-ji
- Lee Se-na as Soon-ae
- Jeon Joon-hong as Section chief Jang
- Jo Jae-yoon as Nal-chi ("Flying Fish")
- Kang Yoo-jin as Min-joo
- Kim Jin-hyeok as "Gecko"
- Kim Jung-tae as President Kim
- Do Young-gu as President Hee-sang
- Kim Jung-hak as President Byun
- Baek Won-gil as Jjang-dol
- Kwon Jae-won as smuggled goods trader
- Kim Seok-hwan as Bond
- Kim Eun-seong as Jeong Yang
- Jo Ha-seok as Do-kki
- Kim Min-gyu as Room salon manager
- Hwang Seung-eon as Mi-na
