= Cherry Tomato (film) =

- Theatrical poster
- Directed by: Jung Young-bae
- Written by: Kim Seong
- Produced by: Kim Hyung-seok; Park Jung-yang
- Starring: Shin Goo; Kim Hyang-gi
- Cinematography: Park Kyung-won
- Release date: May 29, 2008
- Running time: 102 minutes
- Country: South Korea
- Language: Korean

Cherry Tomato (Korean: 방울토마토; RR: Bangul tomato) is a 2008 South Korean film starring Shin Goo and Kim Hyang-gi. The family drama, a directorial debut by Jung Young-bae, a poor old man and his granddaughter. It was screened at the Busan Children's Film Festival in 2008.

== Cast ==
- Shin Goo as Park Gu
- Kim Hyang-gi as Da-seong
- Kim Byung-chun as Kap-soo
- Choi Ji-yeon as Hong-mi
- Choi Dong-gyoon as Dong-hoon
- Kim Young-ho as Da-seong's father, Choon-sam (cameo)
