= Lee Yeon-doo =

South Korean actress (born 1984)

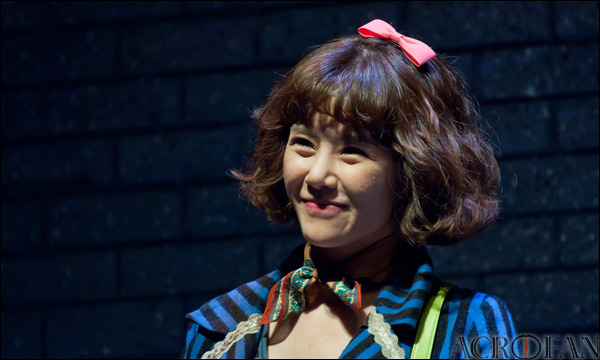
- Lee in 2010
- Born: Lee Hyun-kyung; June 20, 1984 (age 42); Seoul, South Korea
- Education: Dong-ah Institute of Media and Arts
- Occupation: Actress
- Years active: 2006–present
- Agent: FN Entertainment
- Spouse: Unknown (m. 2021)
- Children: 2

Korean name
- Hangul: 이현경
- RR: I Hyeongyeong
- MR: I Hyŏn'gyŏng

Stage name
- Hangul: 이연두
- RR: I Yeondu
- MR: I Yŏndu

Lee Yeon-doo (Korean: 이연두; born June 20, 1984), birth name Lee Hyun-kyung, is a South Korean actress.

== Personal life ==
Lee married her non-celebrity boyfriend on October 9, 2021 after a year of dating.

== Filmography ==
=== Television series ===
| Year | Title | Role/Notes | Network |
|---|---|---|---|
| 2006 | Princess Hours | Park Na-in | MBC |
| 2007 | Dear Lover | Hong Jang-mi | SBS |
| 2008 | Formidable Rivals | | KBS2 |
| 2008–2009 | All About My Family | Jo Min-seon | MBC |
| 2009 | Cinderella Man | Kang Yoon-jeong | MBC |
| 2009–2010 | Enjoy Life | Hye-won | MBC |
| 2011–2012 | Insu, the Queen Mother | Queen Ansun | JTBC |
| 2015 | The Missing | Jung Seon-mi/Jang Mi-young/ Kim Jeong-hee/Lee Soo-jin | OCN |
| 2015–2016 | My Daughter, Geum Sa-wol | Kang Dal-rae | MBC |
| 2016 | One More Happy Ending | Song Min-woo's teacher (cameo) | MBC |
| 2020 | Graceful Friends | TBA | JTBC |
| 2022 | Again My Life | Jung Se-yeon | SBS |
| 2024 | My Merry Marriage | Kang Ji-na | KBS1 |

=== Film ===
| Year | Title | Role | Notes/Ref. |
|---|---|---|---|
| 2015 | Gangnam Blues | Joo So-jeong | |
| 2016 | Mood of the Day | Bo-kyung | |
| 2017 | Biting Fly | Min Soo-kyung | |

=== Variety show ===
| Year | Title | Role | Notes/Ref. |
|---|---|---|---|
| 2015 | I Can See Your Voice season 1 | Panelist | Episodes 6, 7 |

=== Music video appearances ===
| Year | Song title | Artist |
|---|---|---|
| 2007 | "Left Heart" (왼쪽가슴) | K.Will |
| 2008 | "Vain Hope" (희망고문) | Venny |

== Theater ==
| Year | Title | Role | Notes/Ref. |
|---|---|---|---|
| 2010 | The Great Catsby (위대한 캣츠비) | Sun | |
| 2013 | Petty Romance (째째한 로맨스) | Da-rim | |
