= Lee Chang-hoon (actor) =

South Korean actor

- Born: September 8, 1966 (age 60); South Korea
- Occupation: Actor
- Agent: CJ Entertainment
- Spouse: Kim Seung-soo (m. 2008)
- Children: 1
- Family: Lee Geum-joo (sister)

Korean name
- Hangul: 이창훈
- Hanja: 李昌勳
- RR: I Changhun
- MR: I Ch'anghun

Lee Chang-hoon (born September 8, 1966) is a South Korean actor. Lee is a comedian turned actor. He was cast in the lead in Korean dramas Daring Women (2010) and While You Were Sleeping (2011).

== Filmography ==
=== Film ===
Year	Title	Role
1994	Lai Daihan	
1997	Hallelujah	
1998	The Happenings	
2000	Scent of Love	
2002	Four Toes	Lecaf
2005	Tarzan Park Heung-sook	
2007	The Ten-minute Break (short film)	
2008	Unforgettable	Adult Gil-su (narrator)
2019	Tazza: One Eyed Jack	Il-ta

=== Television series ===
Key
†	Denotes television productions that have not yet been released

Year	Title	Role
1993	My Mother's Sea	Sang-gyu
1994	M	Song Ji-suk
1995	Even If the Wind Blows	
1996	A Faraway Country	Hyung-woo
1997	Into the Storm	Lee Kang-chan
1997	Propose	Kwon Hyuk-joon
1997	Myth of a Hero	Kim In-woo
1998	Soonpoong Clinic	Lee Chang-hoon
1998	Song of the Wind	Kim Do-gyun
1999	Sunday Best "Eun bi-ryeong"	Jung-woo
1999	School	Lee Jae-ha
1999	Invitation	Dong-sook
1999	Rising Sun, Rising Moon	Choi Ji-hyuk
2001	Pretty Lady	Kim Hoon
2001	Stock Flower	Kang Min-hyuk
2001	This Is Love	Cha Joon-bum
2001	Mina	Director Kang
2002	Rustic Period	Hyashi
2003	Thousand Years of Love	Kim Cheon-chul
2003	One Million Roses	Kang Min-jae
2005	My Sweetheart, My Darling	Jung Jae-min
2005	Ballad of Seodong	Mok Ra-soo
2006	My Love	Jo Yi-han
2007	Lee San, Wind of the Palace	Crown Prince Sado
2007	Even So Love	Yoon Seok-woo
2010	Daring Women	Han Kyu-jin
2011	While You Were Sleeping	Chae Hyuk-jin
2013	When a Man Falls in Love	Gu Yong-gab
2016	I'm Sorry, But I Love You	Shin Tae-jin
2026	Spooky in Love	Go Pil-dong
2026	Between Steps	Ahn Jae-hong

=== Variety show ===
Year	Title	Network	Notes
2016	Daddy's True Colors	Channel A	As himself

== Awards and nominations ==
Year	Award	Category	Nominated work	Result
2001	KBS Drama Awards	Popularity Award	Stock Flower	Won
2010	SBS Drama Awards	Excellence Award, Actor in a Weekend/Daily Drama	Daring Women	Nominated
2011	SBS Drama Awards	Excellence Award, Actor in a Weekend/Daily Drama	While You Were Sleeping	Nominated
