= Lee Young-eun =

South Korean actress (born 1982)

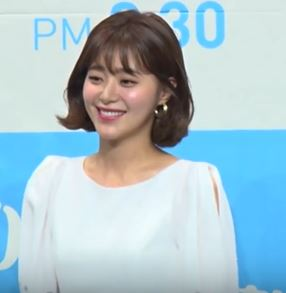
- Lee in 2019
- Born: August 9, 1982 (age 44); Daegu, South Korea
- Education: Dongduk Women's University - Broadcasting and Entertainment
- Occupation: Actress
- Years active: 2003–present
- Agent: J.Wide Company
- Spouse: Go Jung-ho (m. 2014)

Korean name
- Hangul: 이영은
- Hanja: 李令恩
- RR: I Yeongeun
- MR: I Yŏngŭn

Lee Young-eun (Korean: 이영은; born August 9, 1982) is a South Korean actress. She is best known for starring in Korean dramas such as Likeable or Not, OB & GY, While You Were Sleeping, and Can't Stand Anymore.

== Personal life ==
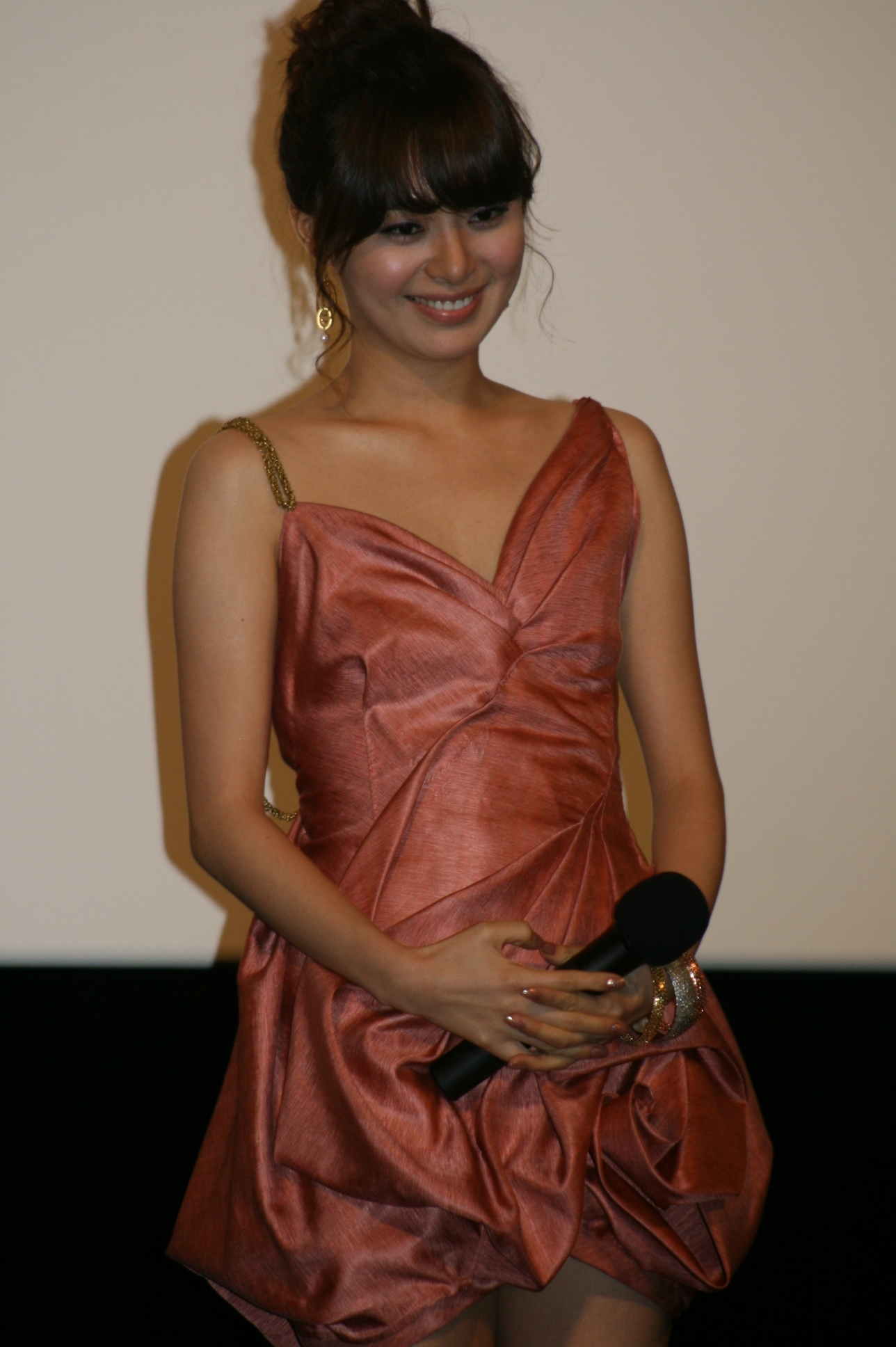
Lee in 2009

Lee married Go Jung-ho, a producer at JTBC, on September 27, 2014, at the Hotel Shilla in Seoul.

== Filmography ==
=== Film ===
| Year | Title | Role | Notes | Ref. |
|---|---|---|---|---|
| 2004 | Too Beautiful to Lie | Choi Soo-mi | | |
| 2007 | Going by the Book | Jeon Da-hye | | |
| 2008 | Summer Whispers | Young-jo | | |
| 2009 | Oh! My God 2 | Lee Eun-ji | | |
| 2012 | Doomsday Book | Newscaster Lee Eun-kyung | segment: "Happy Birthday" | |

=== Television series ===
| Year | Title | Role | Notes | Ref. |
|---|---|---|---|---|
| 2003 | My Fair Lady | Cha Joo-mi | | |
| 2004 | Open Drama Man & Woman | In-hee | episode 139: "Bar Girl" | |
| 2004 | Nonstop 4 | Lee Young-eun | guest – episodes 109, 111 | |
| 2004 | Full House | Hee-jin | | |
| 2005 | Hong Kong Express | Jo Bong-sook | | |
| 2005 | MBC Best Theater | Jo Young-ji | episode 168: "Come to Me, Sweet Villain" | |
| 2006 | Don't Worry | Jo Eun-sae | | |
| 2007 | The Return of Shim Chung | Shim Chung | | |
| 2007 | War of Money | Geum Eun-ji | | |
| 2007 | Delicious Stories | Seo-bin | | |
| 2007 | The King and I | Palace servant | | |
| 2007 | Likeable or Not | Hwang Ji-young | | |
| 2008 | Korean Ghost Stories | Min Yeo-rim/Lee Chae-ok | episode 5: "Oh Goo the Exorcism" | |
| 2008 | Star's Lover | College student | cameo – episode 1 | |
| 2009 | Korean Ghost Stories | Yeon | episode 1: "Kiss of the Vampire" | |
| 2009 | Joseon Mystery Detective: Jeong Yak-yong | Seol-ran | | |
| 2010 | OB & GY | Kim Young-mi | | |
| 2010 | Once Upon a Time in Saengchori | Yoo Eun-joo | | |
| 2011 | While You Were Sleeping | Oh Shin-young | | |
| 2012 | I Remember You | Jung Eun-soo | | |
| 2012 | Father Is Sorry | Kyung-ae | | |
| 2012 | The Wedding Scheme | Yoo Sun-hee | | |
| 2012 | To the Beautiful You | Lee So-jeong | | |
| 2013 | Can't Stand Anymore | Hwang Sun-joo | | |
| 2014 | Gap-dong | Lee Soon-shim | guest – episodes 2–3 | |
| 2014 | My Secret Hotel | Yeo Eun-joo | | |
| 2014 | Punch | Park Hyun-sun | | |
| 2015 | Signal | Kim Yoon-Jung | | |
| 2016 | Still Loving You | Oh Eun-soo | | |
| 2018 | Should We Kiss First? | An Hee-jin | | |
| 2019 | Home for Summer | Wang Geum-hee | | |
| 2022 | The Secret House | Baek Joo-hong | | |
| 2024 | Beauty and Mr. Romantic | Go Myeong-dong | | |

=== Music video appearances ===
| Year | Song title | Artist | Ref. |
|---|---|---|---|
| 2004 | "Destiny" | Sol | |
| 2007 | "Thanks" | Kim Dong-ryool | |
| 2007 | "A Memory of Love" | Seong-A | |
| 2008 | "You Said You Can Love Me" | Sung-je | |
| 2009 | "Sad Love Waltz" | Nemesis | |

=== Television shows ===
| Year | Title | Role | Ref. |
|---|---|---|---|
| 2003 | Kang Ho-dong's Soulmates | | |
| 2008 | Happiness in ₩10,000: Happiness Ltd. | | |

== Awards and nominations ==
Name of the award ceremony, year presented, category, nominee of the award, and the result of the nomination
| Award ceremony | Year | Category | Nominee / Work | Result | Ref. |
|---|---|---|---|---|---|
| Grand Bell Awards | 2009 | Best New Actress | Summer Whispers | Nominated | |
| KBS Drama Awards | 2019 | Excellence Award, Actress in a Daily Drama | Home For Summer | Won | |
| Korea Drama Awards | 2008 | Netizen Popularity Award | Likeable or Not | Nominated | |
| Korean Culture and Entertainment Awards | 2011 | Excellence Award, Actress in a Drama | While You Were Sleeping | Won | |
| MBC Drama Awards | 2022 | Top Excellence Award, Actress in a Daily/Short Drama | The Secret House | Nominated | |
| SBS Drama Awards | 2007 | New Star Award | War of Money | Won | |
| SBS Drama Awards | 2011 | Excellence Award, Actress in a Weekend/Daily Drama | While You Were Sleeping | Nominated | |
