= Kim Young-ho (actor) =

South Korean actor and singer (born 1967)

- Born: May 27, 1967 (age 59); Chungju, North Chungcheong Province, South Korea
- Education: Cheongju University – Industrial Engineering
- Occupations: Actor; singer
- Years active: 1988–present
- Agent: Interactive Media Mix
- Spouse: Choi Soo-im

Korean name
- Hangul: 김영호
- Hanja: 金英浩
- RR: Gim Yeongho
- MR: Kim Yŏngho

Kim Young-ho (Korean: 김영호; born May 27, 1967) is a South Korean actor and singer. Kim was a vocalist for underground rock band Ji-poong-woo in Cheongju in 1988, and performed at the River Music Festival in 1990. He made his musical theatre debut in 1994, and began acting onscreen in 1999. Kim has since appeared in film, television and stage, notably in Club Butterfly (2001), Blue (2003), Night and Day (2008), Portrait of a Beauty (2008) and City of Fathers (2009).

== Filmography ==
=== Film ===
Year	Title	Role	Notes
1999	City of the Rising Sun	Boxing trainer	
1999	A Growing Business	Boss Hong	
1999	Phantom: The Submarine	Number 872	
2001	Club Butterfly	Hyuk	
2003	Blue	Lee Tae-hyeon	
2003	My Wife Is a Gangster 2	(cameo)	
2004	Spin Kick	Song Chung-geun	
2008	Night and Day	Kim Seong-nam	
2008	Cherry Tomato	Choon-sam (cameo)	
2008	Portrait of a Beauty	Kim Hong-do	
2009	City of Fathers	Jo Tae-suk	
2009	19-Nineteen	Kim Ha-neul	
2010	Looking for My Wife	VNM band master (cameo)	
2010	Hahaha	Yi Sun-sin	
2010	The Grass Is Greener	Jong-hoon	
2010	End of Animal	Taxi driver	
2011	My Secret Partner	Joon-seok	
2014	Song of an Angel	—N/a	credited as director/screenwriter
2015	Confession	Sang-woo	
2023	Green Night	Lee Seung Hoon	Hong Kong, China drama film

=== Television series ===
Year	Title	Role
1996	Start	Kim Chul
2000	Foolish Love	Jo Yong-bae
2000	Drama City "Zero-sum Game"	Joon-ho
2001	Drama City "C.S. – Thoracic Surgery"	Thoracic surgeon Young-ho
2001	Drama City "Thug Dad"	Lee Kang-sik
2001	Fox and Cotton Candy	Son Young-ho
2001	Drama City "Alumni"	Kang Dong-soo
2001	MBC Best Theater "Winter's Promise"	Park Seok-joon
2002	Drama City "Thug Dad 2"	Lee Kang-sik
2002	Lovers	Man on motorcycle Kim Young-ho (cameo)
2002	The Maengs' Golden Era	Seo Sang-hoon
2002	Open Drama Man and Woman "She Loves"	Im Dong-pal
2002	Rustic Period	adult Lee Jung-jae
2003	Ang-sook	Il-do
2004	Jang Gil-san	Park Dae-geun
2004	A Second Proposal	Lee Min-seok
2005	My Love Toram	Kim Sung-min
2005	I Love You, My Enemy	Oh Jong-se
2005	Ballad of Seodong	Buyeo Seon
2006	Finding Dorothy	Park Yong-soo
2007	Salt Doll	Park Yeon-woo
2007	Love Isn't Stop	(episode: "Tangerine Ghost")
2008	Unstoppable Marriage	Impostor
2010	The Scarlet Letter	Jang Jae-yong
2011	Insu, the Queen Mother	Grand Prince Suyang
2013	Monstar	Min Gwang-ho
2013	Empress Ki	Baek-ahn (Bayan)
2018	Suits	Ham Ki-taek
2021	A Good Supper	Park Kyeong-Cheol

=== Variety shows ===
Year	Title	Notes/Ref.
2010	Morning Wide	
2010	Access! Movie World	Host
2011	Carried by the Wind	Cast member
2011–2012	Visual Tracking NOW	Host
2012	DNA Korea – Season 1	Host
2013	Splash	
2013	DNA Korea – Season 2	Host
2016	True Dad Confession	As himself

=== Music video appearances ===
Year	Song title	Artist
2008	"Cosmos"	Jo Kwan-woo
2013	"Sad Promise"	Speed

== Theater ==
Year	Title	Role
1994	Guys and Dolls	
	The Last Empress	
	Wandering Stars	
	Adolescence	
	Ground Zero	
	Hair	
	Evergreen Tree	Park Dong-hwa
	Promise for Promise	
2004	Two Men	
2006	Annie	Daddy Warbucks
2007	There Is a Soup	
2008	The Trial of Abelman	
2011	Dream Hair	James/Park Chul-soo
2014	42nd Street	Julian Marsh

== Discography ==
Album information	Track listing
"Walking With" / "Where Is the End of the Parting?": 2 tracks from A Second Proposal OST; Released: October 12, 2004; Label: Pan Entertainment, Yedang Records, iKpop	Track listing: 04. 동행 (Walking With); 07. 이별의 끝은 어디인가요 (Where Is the End of the Parting?)
"Like Rain, Like Music": Track from Kim Hyun-sik's 20th Anniversary 2nd: Like Music; Released: April 30, 2010; Label: Milky Works, LOEN Entertainment	Track listing: 03. 비처럼 음악처럼 (Like Rain, Like Music)
"The Darkness, the Starlight": Track from Kim Hyun-sik's 20th Anniversary Tribute Album: Like Rain, Like Music; Released: May 11, 2010; Label: Milky Works, LOEN Entertainment	Track listing: 05. 어둠, 그 별빛 (The Darkness, the Starlight)
"Just a Nice Person": Track from Green Days: Dinosaur and I OST; Released: June 3, 2011; Label: Movie Closer, Sony Music	Track listing: 02. 그냥 좋은 사람 (Just a Nice Person)
Carried by the Wind Project – Part 2: Single; Released: October 9, 2011; Label: Yedang Company, LOEN Entertainment	Track listing: 1. 홀로 된다는 것 (Becoming Alone); 2. 홀로 된다는 것 (Becoming Alone) (Inst.)
Carried by the Wind Project – Part 5: Single; Released: November 6, 2011; Label: Yedang Company, LOEN Entertainment	Track listing: 1. MaMa (feat. Bobby Kim); 2. MaMa (Without Voice)
Color (색): EP; Released: March 6, 2013; Label: Interactive Media Mix, CJ E&M Music	Track listing: 1. 처음 (First); 2. 그대를 보낸다 (I Let You Go) (feat. Kim Tae-won of Boohwal); 3. 떠나가네 (Leaving) (feat. Park Joo-won); 4. 그대를 보낸다 (I Let You Go) (Inst.); 5. 떠나가네 (Leaving) (Inst.)
As a Man (남자라서): EP; Released: November 26, 2013; Label: Interactive Media Mix, LOEN Entertainment	Track listing: 1. 남자라서 (As a Man); 2. 잃어버린 사랑 (Lost Love); 3. 엄마 (Mom); 4. Only You; 5. 기원 (Origin)

== Bibliography ==
Year	Title	Publisher	ISBN
2012	그대가 저 멀리 간 뒤라도, 하고 싶은 이야기가 있습니다	Art Blue	ISBN 9788992904261
2013	그대, 살다, 잊다	Book Nomad	ISBN 9788997835348

== Awards and nominations ==
Year	Award	Category	Nominated work	Result
2003	SBS Drama Awards	Best Actor in a Drama Short	Ang-sook	Won
2008	17th Buil Film Awards	Best Actor	Night and Day	Won
