= Daring Women =

2010 South Korean television series

- Promotional poster
- Also known as: Daring Woman
- Genre: Drama; Romance
- Written by: Park Ye-kyung
- Directed by: Lee Dong-hoon
- Starring: Lee Yu-ri; Lee Chang-hoon; Seo Ji-young; Lee Joong-moon
- Country of origin: South Korea
- Original language: Korean
- No. of episodes: 105

Production
- Executive producer: Choi Moon-seok
- Production location: Korea
- Running time: Mondays to Fridays at 08:40 (KST)
- Production company: Pan Entertainment

Original release
- Network: Seoul Broadcasting System
- Release: 2 March – 30 July 2010

Daring Women (Korean: 당돌한 여자; RR: Dangdolhan yeoja) is a 2010 South Korean television series starring Lee Yu-ri, Lee Chang-hoon, Seo Ji-young, and Lee Joong-moon. The morning soap opera aired on SBS on Mondays to Fridays at 8:40 a.m. from March 2 to July 30, 2010 for 105 episodes.

== Plot ==
Ji Soon-young loses her husband, Wang Se-joon, in a tragic accident. She is left alone to take care of their adopted daughter. She meets and falls in love with Han Kyu-jin, who happens to be the father-in-law of her friend and former sister-in-law, Wang Se-bin. Their lives change when Soon-young marries Kyu-jin and becomes Se-bin's mother-in-law. They have to adjust to their new roles in the family and try to get along with each other.

== Cast ==
Wang family

- Lee Yu-ri as Ji Soon-young
- Kang Sung-min as Wang Se-joon (husband)
- Seo Ji-young as Wang Se-bin (sister-in-law)
- Kim Ha-kyun as Wang Man-gil (father-in-law)
- Kim Chung as Ha Eun-shil (mother-in-law)
- Lee Chan-joo as Wang Saet-byul (Soon-young's adopted daughter)

Han family

- Lee Chang-hoon as Han Kyu-jin
- Lee Joong-moon as Han Joo-myung (son)
- Hong In-young as Han Joo-ran (daughter)
- Kim Soo-mi as Hong Bo-ok (mother)

Ji Soon-young's family

- Son Hwa-ryung as Hwang Mo-ran (cousin)
- Jung Woo as Baek Dong-soo (Mo-ran's husband)
- Lee Jong-nam as Go Min-ja (aunt, Mo-ran's mother)

Han Kyu-jin's office

- Kim Ji-wan as Kim Sang-soo
- Park Yong-ki as Lee Yong-joo (office manager)
- Sa Hee as Na Chae-young

Extended cast

- Hwang Dong-soo as Oh Dong-jae
- Kim Na-young as Noh Eun-kyung
- Min Joon-hyun
- Kim Ga-eun
- Kim Joon-hyung
