= Can't Stand Anymore =

2013 South Korean television series

- Promotional poster
- Hangul: 더 이상은 못 참아
- RR: Deo isangeun mot chama
- MR: Tŏ isangŭn mot ch'ama
- Genre: Romance
- Created by: JTBC Production Plan
- Written by: Seo Young-myung; Park Byung-wook
- Directed by: Lee Min-chul; Yoon Jae-won
- Starring: Baek Il-seob; Sunwoo Yong-nyeo; Lee Young-eun; Kim Jin-woo
- Country of origin: South Korea
- Original language: Korean
- No. of episodes: 111

Production
- Executive producer: Jo Joon-hyung
- Running time: 40 minutes
- Production companies: Drama House; JS Pictures

Original release
- Network: JTBC
- Release: August 5, 2013 – January 9, 2014

Can't Stand Anymore (Korean: 더 이상은 못 참아; RR: Deo Isangeun Mot Chama; lit. 'Can't Take It Anymore') is a 2013–14 South Korean television series starring Baek Il-seob, Sunwoo Yong-nyeo, Lee Young-eun and Kim Jin-woo. It aired on JTBC's Monday–Friday time slot from August 5, 2013 to January 9, 2014.

== Synopsis ==
The story of Gil Bok-ja (Sunwoo Yong-nyeo) who decides to get a divorce after 50 years of marriage.

== Cast ==
=== Main ===
- Baek Il-seob as Hwang Jong-gap
- Sunwoo Yong-nyeo as Gil Bok-ja
- Lee Young-eun as Hwang Sun-joo
- Kim Jin-woo as Jo Sung-woo

=== Supporting ===
- Oh Young-shil as Hwang Sun-ae
- Kim Hyung-il as Park Chang-soo
- Min Ji-young as Jin Ae-hee
- Lee Yul-eum as Park Eun-mi
- Park Chang-ik as Park Eun-soo
- Choi Ji-won as Yoon So-hyun
- Sunwoo Jae-duk as Hwang Sun-ho
- Bang Eun-hee as Yoo Jung-sook
- Kim Young-jae as Hwang Jae-min
- Kim Sung-min as Hwang Kang-ho
- Ahn Yeon-hong as Noh Young-hee
- Jo Min-ah as Hwang Jin-joo
- Hong Yeo-jin as Lee Nak-bok
- Chae So-young as Joo Se-yong
- Park Young-ji as Oh Man-bong
- Greena Park as Oh Seung-ri
- Kim Hyun-joon as Hong Bok-gyu
- Han Seung-hyun as Yoon Ji-hyun
- Lee Dae-ro as Grandfather

== Production ==
Screenwriter Seo Young-myung, who signed an exclusive contract with JS Pictures in 2010, was notified of the annulation of her contract on September 6, 2013. At the time, 25 episodes had aired and seven more had been written. She filed a lawsuit for damages against the producers and broadcasters. She was replaced by Park Byung-wook.
