= Kim Jin-woo (actor) =

South Korean actor and singer

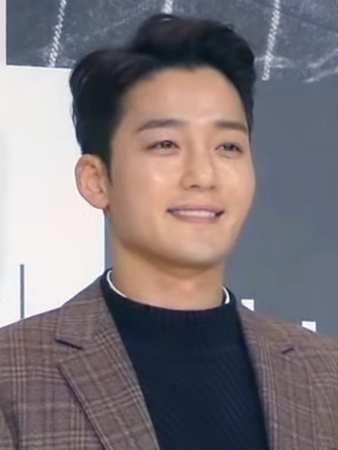
- Kim in December 2018
- Born: July 17, 1983 (age 43); Seoul, South Korea
- Occupations: Actor; singer
- Years active: 2006–present
- Agent: Cube Entertainment

Korean name
- Hangul: 김진우
- Hanja: 金鎭祐
- RR: Gim Jinu
- MR: Kim Chinu

Kim Jin-woo (born July 17, 1983) is a South Korean actor and singer. He began his acting career in musical theatre, and has since starred in television series such as Queen and I (2012), The Birth of a Family (2012), Can't Stand Anymore (2013) and The Return of Hwang Geum-bok (2015).

== Personal life ==
In September 2018 it was announced that the actor would wed his girlfriend at a venue in Seoul. The bride is three years younger than him and works as a flight attendant. They met through the introduction of an acquaintance and have been seeing each other since the previous spring. He also previously announced their engagement in July.

== Filmography ==
=== Television series ===
Year	Title	Role
2010	Road No. 1	Kim Soo-hyuk
2010	Please Marry Me	Lawyer Park
2010	Smile, Mom	Bae Yeon-woo
2011	Can't Lose	So Joo-hyun
2012	I Remember You	Ha Kang-soo
2012	12 Signs of Love	Won Bin
2012	Queen and I	Han Dong-min
2012	The King of Dramas	Kim Jin-woo (cameo)
2012	The Birth of a Family	Lee Soo-ho
2013	Can't Stand Anymore	Jo Sung-woo
2014	Golden Cross	Kim Se-ryung's lover (cameo)
2014	Wife Scandal – The Wind Rises	Gentleman (episode 4: "Love Battery")
2014	My Lovely Girl	Seo Jae-young
2014	KBS Drama Special – "Bride in Sneakers"	Jang Hee-soon
2015	The Return of Hwang Geum-bok	Seo In-woo
2015–2016	Remember	Judge Kang Suk-gyu
2016	The Unusual Family	Goo Yoon-jae
2016	Monster	Park Ji-su (cameo)
2017	Reunited Worlds	Cha Tae-hoon
2017	Rain or Shine	Lee In-yong (cameo)
2018	Welcome to Waikiki	Sol's father (cameo)
2018	KBS Drama Special – "Ms. Kim's Mystery"	Choi Seong-min
2018	My Strange Hero	groom (cameo, ep 1)
2019	Left-Handed Wife	Lee Soo-ho / Park Do-kyung
2019	Loss Time Life	Gu Jin-seong
2019	Graceful Family	Mo Wan-joon
2022	Kill Heel	Doil
2022	Again My Life	Choi Gang-jin
2023	Longing for You	profiler (special appearance)
2023	Elegant Empire	Jang Ki-yoon (ep 1–10)

=== Variety shows ===
Year	Title	Role
2016	King of Mask Singer	Contestant (Full of Soul Check It Out) Episode 41

=== Film ===
Year	Title	Role
2009	Flight	Young-ho
2014	Virgin Theory: 7 Steps to Get On the Top	Woo Sang-woo
2017	Biting Fly	Kang Hae-wook

=== TV films ===
Year	Title	Role
2015	I'm After You	Min Hyung-Woo

== Musical theatre ==
Year	Title	Role
2007	Innocent Steps	Ensemble
2007–2008	Footloose	Ren McCormack
2008	Grease	Danny Zuko
2008–2009	Cats	Rum Tum Tugger
2009	All Shook Up	Chad
2010	La Dolce Vita	Lee Joon-soo
2011	The Three Musketeers	D'Artagnan

== Discography ==
Year	Song title	Notes
2010	"Raining"	single; feat. Son Hoyoung
2010	"Love Latte"	single; duet with Eugene
2010	"Only You"	track from Road No. 1 OST
2010	"Crying and Laughing"	track from Smile, Mom OST
