= While You Were Sleeping (2011 TV series) =

2011 South Korean TV series

- Promotional poster
- Genre: Romance; Melodrama; Revenge
- Written by: Ma Joo-hee
- Directed by: Park Kyung-ryul
- Starring: Lee Chang-hoon; Choi Won-young; Oh Yoon-ah; Lee Young-eun
- Country of origin: South Korea
- Original language: Korean
- No. of episodes: 120

Production
- Executive producer: Kim Jung-min
- Producer: Kim Yong-jin
- Production location: South Korea
- Running time: Mondays to Fridays at 19:15 (KST)
- Production companies: Story TV; JerryBoys Contents (formerly Bloom Entertainment)

Original release
- Network: Seoul Broadcasting System
- Release: 16 May – 9 November 2011

While You Were Sleeping (Korean: 당신이 잠든 사이; RR: Dangsini jamdeun sai) is a 2011 South Korean television series starring Lee Chang-hoon, Choi Won-young, Oh Yoon-ah and Lee Young-eun. The daily drama aired on SBS on Mondays to Fridays at 19:15 from May 16 to November 9, 2011 for 120 episodes.

== Plot ==
Oh Shin-young (Lee Young-eun) is a hospital cafeteria nutritionist with a bright personality, who is happily married to Yoon Min-joon (Choi Won-young), who works in the sales department of a food company. But while giving birth, Shin-young falls into a vegetative state induced by the hospital's chief obstetrician Go Hyun-sung (Oh Yoon-ah). Hyun-sung is Min-joon's ex-girlfriend who is still in love with him, despite being married to Chae Hyuk-jin (Lee Chang-hoon), the director of a food company and Min-joon's boss. When Hyuk-jin learns of his wife's betrayal, he plans his revenge.

== Cast ==
Main characters

- Lee Chang-hoon as Chae Hyuk-jin
- Choi Won-young as Yoon Min-joon
- Oh Yoon-ah as Go Hyun-sung
- Lee Young-eun as Oh Shin-young

Hyuk-jin's family

- Jung Dong-hwan as Chae Dae-pil
- Park Joon-geum as Mrs. Jang
- Baek Min-hyun as Chae Woo-jin
- Kim Jin-woo as Chae Hwan-hee

Min-joon's family

- Kim Ha-kyun as Yoon Hwang-goo
- Song Ok-sook as Na Pil-boon
- Lee Sung-yeol as Yoon So-joon

Hyun-sung's family

- Kim Hak-chul as Go Kyung-ho
- Ahn Hae-sook as Lee Hye-ja

Shin-young's family

- Kang Ye-sol as Oh Shin-hye
- Lee Duk-hee as Shin Sook-hee

Extended cast

- Ahn Ji-hyun as Maeng Hyun-joo
- Min Joon-hyun as Chae Dae-pil's secretary
- Lee Bum-hak as Bum-goo
- Park Woo-chun

== Awards and nominations ==
Year	Award	Category	Recipient	Result
2011	19th SBS Drama Awards	Excellence Award, Actor in a Weekend/Daily Drama	Lee Chang-hoon	Nominated
2011	19th SBS Drama Awards	Excellence Award, Actress in a Weekend/Daily Drama	Lee Young-eun	Nominated
2011	19th SBS Drama Awards	Excellence Award, Actress in a Weekend/Daily Drama	Oh Yoon-ah	Nominated
2011	19th SBS Drama Awards	Special Acting Award, Actress in a Weekend/Daily Drama	Park Joon-geum	Nominated
