= Biting Fly =

- Theatrical poster
- Hangul: 쇠파리
- RR: Soepari
- MR: Soep'ari
- Directed by: Ahn Cheol-ho
- Starring: Kim Jin-woo; Lee Yeon-doo
- Cinematography: Ahn Se-jin
- Distributed by: Gram Films
- Release date: May 25, 2017 (South Korea)
- Running time: 111 minutes
- Country: South Korea
- Language: Korean

Biting Fly is a 2017 South Korean crime drama film directed by Ahn Cheol-ho.

== Cast ==
- Kim Jin-woo as Kang Hae-wook
- Lee Yeon-doo as Min Soo-kyung
- Jung In-gi as Kang Man-sik
- Kim Hee-jung as Kang Hae-sun
- Kim Young-han as No Jin-han
- Ko Eun-yi as Choi Mi-hye
- Kang Dae-yoon as Criminal Intelligence Police
