= True Dad Confession =

- True Dad Confession Poster
- Genre: Reality television
- Written by: Kim Sung-won; Uhm Chae-yeong; Jeong Dan-yeong; Han Yeong-sin; Han Bora; Ha Sang-hui; Park Hui-ra; Lee Sin-hyeong
- Country of origin: South Korea
- Original language: Korean
- No. of seasons: 1
- No. of episodes: 57

Production
- Executive producer: Park Gyeong-sik
- Producer: Lee Jin-min

Original release
- Network: Channel A
- Release: July 6, 2016 – present

True Dad Confession (Korean: 아빠본색; RR: Appabonsaek) is a 2016 South Korean television program that follows the lives of three celebrities who are fathers. It airs on Channel A every Wednesday at 21:30 (KST).

== Content ==
True Dad Confession is an observational reality program depicting the daily lives of different fathers. This show portrays the fathers' yearning for their children's love and attention. True Dad Confession allows the fathers to finally have some bonding time with their children.

== Hosts ==
- Kim Gura
- Joo Young-hoon
- Moon Hee-joon

== Current families ==
=== Kim Family ===
- Kim Gura
- Kim Dong-hyeon (son)

=== Joo family ===
- Joo Young-hoon
- Lee Yun-Mi (wife)
- Joo Ara (daughter)
- Joo Rael (daughter)

=== Lee family ===
- Lee Jun-hyeok
- Ji Young-an (wife)
- Lee Ji-hoon (son)
- Lee Yeon-hoon (son)
- Lee Eun-seo (daughter)

=== Lee family ===
- Lee Yoon-suk
- Kim Soo-kyung (wife)
- Lee Seung-hyuk (son)

=== Kim family ===
- Kim Hyung-kyu
- Kim Yoon-ah (wife)
- Kim Min-jae (son)

== Former families ==
=== Kim Family ===
- Kim Young-ho
- Kim Byeol (daughter)
- Kim Sol (daughter)
- Kim Gang (daughter)

=== Lee Family ===
- Lee Chang-hoon
- Kim Mi-jeong (wife)
- Lee Hyo-joo (daughter)

=== Kim family ===
- Kim Heung-gook
- Yoon Tae-young (wife)
- Kim Dong-hyun (son)
- Kim Joo-hyun (daughter)

=== Lee family ===
- Lee Han-wi
- Choi Hye-kyung (wife)
- Lee Kyung (daughter)
- Lee Yoon (daughter)
- Lee On (son)

== Ratings ==
In the ratings below, the highest rating for the show will be in red, and the lowest rating for the show will be in blue each year.

=== 2016 ===
List of ratings (episode 1–25)

Episode	Date	AGB Ratings	TNmS Ratings
Episode	Date	Nationwide	Nationwide
1	July 6, 2016	3.915%	3.8%
2	July 13, 2016	2.348%	2.0%
3	July 20, 2016	2.541%	2.5%
4	July 27, 2016	3.141%	3.1%
5	August 3, 2016	2.873%	2.6%
6	August 10, 2016	2.718%	2.5%
7	August 17, 2016	2.787%	2.8%
8	August 24, 2016	2.382%	2.9%
9	August 31, 2016	1.809%	1.8%
10	September 7, 2016	2.326%	2.4%
11	September 14, 2016	2.015%	1.7%
12	September 21, 2016	2.743%	1.9%
13	September 28, 2016	2.253%	2.6%
14	October 5, 2016	1.930%	1.8%
15	October 12, 2016	1.885%	1.8%
16	October 19, 2016	1.887%	1.5%
17	October 26, 2016	2.011%	2.0%
18	November 2, 2016	2.067%	1.6%
19	November 9, 2016	1.757%	2.2%
20	November 23, 2016	2.469%	2.8%
21	November 30, 2016	2.159%	2.2%
22	December 7, 2016	1.925%	2.0%
23	December 14, 2016	1.792%	2.0%
24	December 21, 2016	1.960%	2.0%
25	December 28, 2016	1.932%	1.7%

=== 2017 ===
List of ratings (episode 25-present)

Episode	Date	AGB Ratings	TNmS Ratings
Episode	Date	Nationwide	Nationwide
26	January 4, 2017	1.803%	1.7%
27	January 11, 2017	1.887%	1.4%
28	January 18, 2017	1.478%	1.7%
29	January 25, 2017	1.949%	1.5%
30	February 1, 2017	1.708%	1.6%
31	February 8, 2017	1.204%	1.1%
32	February 15, 2017	1.520%	1.7%
33	February 22, 2017	1.334%	1.2%
34	March 1, 2017	1.295%	1.2%
35	March 8, 2017	1.542%	1.1%
36	March 15, 2017	1.520%	1.0%
37	March 22, 2017	1.402%	1.7%
38	March 29, 2017	1.114%	1.3%
39	April 5, 2017	1.557%	1.4%
40	April 12, 2017	2.004%	1.9%
41	April 19, 2017	1.494%	1.6%
42	April 26, 2017	2.152%	2.0%
43	May 3, 2017	2.452%	2.4%
44	May 10, 2017	1.529%	1.8%
45	May 17, 2017	2.589%	2.0%
46	May 24, 2017	1.785%	1.7%
47	May 31, 2017	1.998%	1.6%
48	June 7, 2017	1.674%	1.3%
49	June 14, 2017	1.907%	1.6%
50	June 21, 2017	2.009%	1.7%
51	June 28, 2017	1.932%	1.8%
52	July 5, 2017	2.400%	2.0%
53	July 12, 2017	2.377%	2.4%
54	July 19, 2017	2.098%	1.6%
55	July 26, 2017	1.805%	2.3%
56	August 2, 2017	2.044%	2.2%
57	August 9, 2017	2.000%	2.1%
