= Yoon Yoo-sun =

South Korean actress (born 1969)

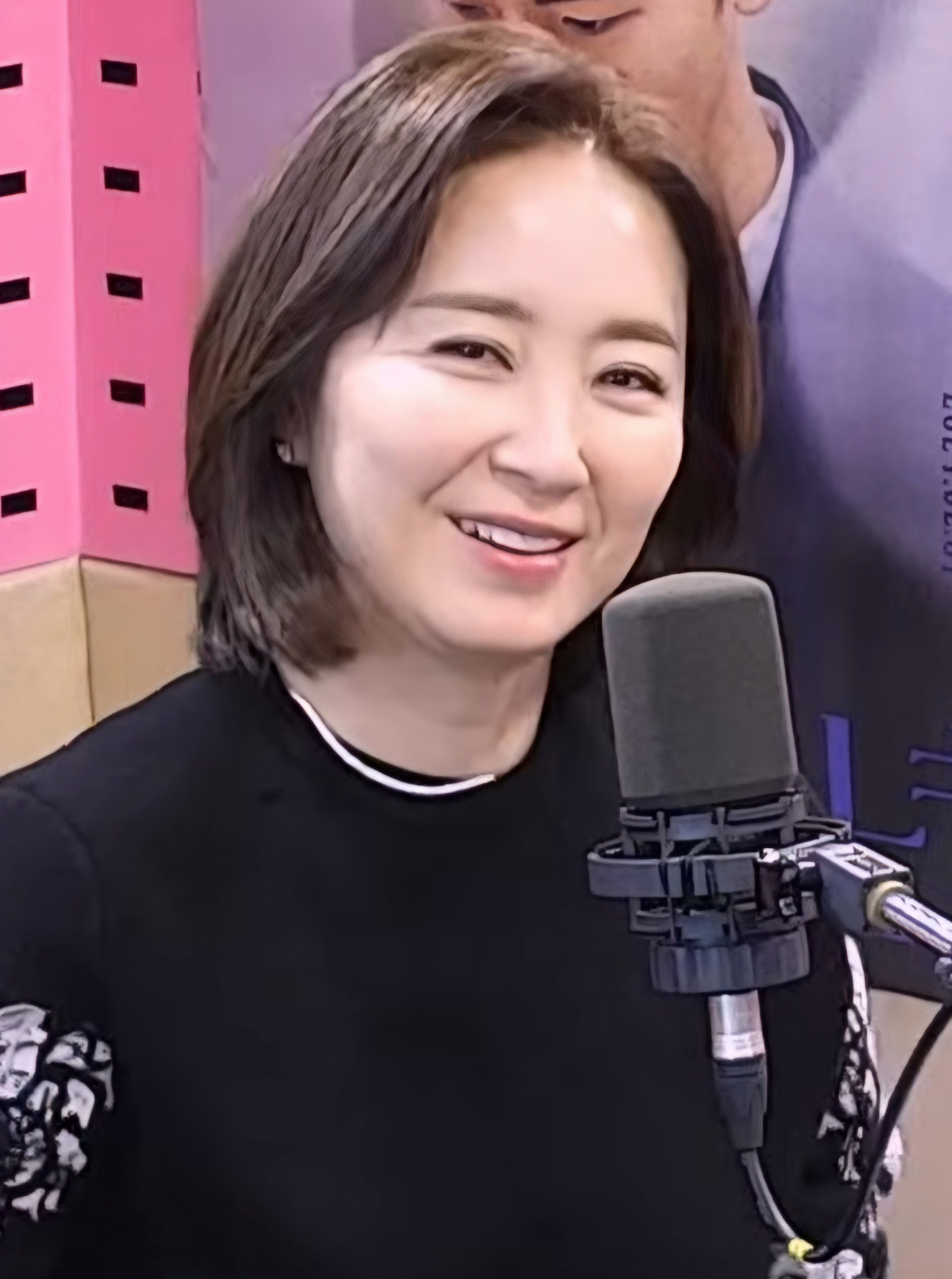
- Yoon in 2024
- Born: January 17, 1969 (age 57); Seoul, South Korea
- Education: Seoul Art College
- Occupation: Actress
- Years active: 1975–present
- Agent: Hinge Entertainment
- Spouse: Lee Sung-ho (m. 2001)
- Children: 2
- Family: Lee Sung-yeol (nephew-in-law); Lee Dae-yeol (nephew-in-law)

Korean name
- Hangul: 윤유선
- Hanja: 尹宥善
- RR: Yun Yuseon
- MR: Yun Yusŏn

Yoon Yoo-sun (Korean: 윤유선; born January 17, 1969) is a South Korean actress. She began her career as a child actress in 1975, and continued acting as an adult in film and television, including in The Story of Two Women (1994), Even If the Wind Blows (1995), High Kick: Revenge of the Short Legged (2011), and Another Promise (2014).

== Personal life ==
Her two nephews by marriage are the K-pop idols Lee Sung-yeol (member of K-pop boy group Infinite) and his younger brother Lee Dae-yeol (leader of K-pop boy group Golden Child), both sons of her brother-in-law (her husband's brother).

== Filmography ==
=== Film ===
Year	Title	Role	Ref.
1975	You Become a Star, Too	Yoon-jung	
1976	Yes, Good-Bye Today		
1978	When Sadness Takes Over a Wave	Child	
1978	The Flying Iljimae		
1978	The Last Winter		
1980	Colors of the Rainbow		
1980	Two Women		
1981	Subzero Point '81	young Yang-ja	
1982	Temptation		
1985	Straight Hair at Nineteen	So-hee	
1986	Soul Mates of '88		
1994	The Story of Two Women	Kyung-ja	
2000	My Heart	Bok-nyeo	
2001	Jesus Is My Boss	Young-hee	
2006	Righteous Ties	Hwa-yi (cameo)	
2007	My Son	Mother goose (voice cameo)	
2008	Open City	Jo Soo-hyeon	
2014	Another Promise	Yoon Jeong-im	
2022	Doom Doom	Shin-ae	
2024	Walker		

=== Television series ===
Year	Title	Role	Ref.
1977	Blue Thread Red Thread		
1979	Oddogi Squad		
1980	Dance of Breaking Sky	Danjong	
1981	The Supreme Order		
1981	Tiger Teacher		
1982	Let's Love	Youngest daughter	
1982	Women's History – "Jang Hui-bin"		
1987	Land	Song-ae	
1988	Heavens Heavens		
1989	Merry Go Round		
1990	Years of Ambition	Han Ji-won	
1991	Hyung (My Older Brother)	Dong-sook	
1992	The Tale of Oh Yoo-ran	Oh Yoo-ran	
1993	Whisky and Pork Ribs		
1993	People of Macheon Village		
1994	Stranger in Paradise	In-sook	
1995	Even If the Wind Blows	Chung-ja	
1995	The Way to Bibong	Sung-hee	
1996	Mimang (Illusionist)		
1996	The Scent of Apple Blossoms	Seo Young-min	
1996	Im Kkeok-jeong	Sup Sup-yi	
1996	Wonji-dong Blues		
1997	Your Daughter, Our Son		
1997	MBC Best Theater – "One Spring Day's Fairytale"	Eun-kyung	
1997	A Woman Eating Rice Alone	Jung-ok	
1997	Happiness for Sale	Yoon Soo-jae's wife	
1997	KBS TV Novel – Light on the Prairie"		
1997	White Christmas		
1997	Model		
1998	Horse's Hill	Won-hee	
1998	Love Is All I Know	Young-shim	
1998	Until the End of the World		
1998	Seoul Tango	Jo Ha-young	
1998	The King and the Queen	Eom Gwi-in	
1999	When Time Flows	Park Jung-hee	
1999	MBC Best Theater – "Princess Bari"	Young-ran	
1999	Days of Delight	Hong Ae-ok	
2000	Tough Guy's Love	Jung Hye-soon	
2000	Pardon	Ahn Jung-ae	
2001	Her House	Jang Tae-sook	
2002	Magic Kid Masuri	Lee Mi-ran	
2002	In This World	Young-sook	
2003	Love Letter	Sister Gemma	
2003	MBC Best Theater – "Mother-in-law Is Scary"	Yoon-joo	
2003	MBC Best Theater – "Our Writing Class"	Eun-ah's mother	
2004	Phoenix	Dr. Ahn Ji-young	
2004	Freezing Point	Wang Hee-kyung	
2004	MBC Best Theater – "Husband's Housekeeper"		
2005	Princess Lulu	Go Hee-soo's mother	
2005	641 Family	Sung Soon-ah	
2006	Princess Hours	Empress Consort Min	
2006	Goodbye Solo	Lee Mi-ja	
2006	Spring Waltz	Jo Hye-sun	
2006	Hearts of Nineteen	Park Yoon-ji	
2006	My Beloved Sister	Kim Geon-sook	
2007	Drama City – "Run Gong-joo"	Lee Dong-hee	
2007	Air City	Young-jae's older sister	
2007	Ground Zero	Lee Mi-sook	
2007	The King and I	Wol-hwa	
2008	Robber	Kwon Oh-sook	
2008	Love Marriage	Yoon Hye-sun	
2009	The Return of Iljimae	Japanese married couple (guest)	
2009	The Slingshot	Chae Do-woo's mother	
2009	Queen Seondeok	Queen Maya	
2010	Giant	Jung Young-sun (cameo)	
2010	My Girlfriend Is a Gumiho	Cha Min-sook	
2010	Marry Me, Mary!	Drama writer Lee Kang-hyeon	
2011	The Duo	Mak-soon	
2011	Birdie Buddy	Jo Kyung-sook	
2011	High Kick: Revenge of the Short Legged	Yoon Yoo-sun	
2012	KBS Drama Special – "A Corner"	Oh Mi-ran	
2012	Ugly Cake	Kim Soo-kyung	
2013	Hur Jun, The Original Story	Hong Choon-yi	
2013	Jang Ok-jung, Living by Love	Lady Kang	
2013	KBS Drama Special – "Family Bandage"	Jo Hye-sook	
2013	Good Doctor	Oh Kyung-joo	
2013	The Eldest	Woman from Banchon	
2013	One Well-Raised Daughter	Joo Hyo-sun	
2014	Wonderful Days	Jo Young-ran	
2014	Potato Star 2013QR3	Bakeshop owner (ep.112)	
2014	High School King of Savvy	Yoo Jin-woo's mother (cameo)	
2014	Run, Jang-mi	Na Yeon-joo	
2015	Thank You, My Son	Yoon Ji-hye	
2015	The Producers	Kim Tae-ho's wife (ep.5)	
2015	My Mom	Nam Ok	
2015	She Was Pretty	Cha Hye-jung	
2016	Six Flying Dragons	Boon-yi (old)	
2016	Flowers of the Prison	Mrs. Kim	
2016	Shopping King Louie	Hong Jae-sook	
2016	Weightlifting Fairy Kim Bok-joo	Kim Jung-yeon (ep.6)	
2017	Save Me	Kim Bo-eun	
2017	Oh, the Mysterious	Gook Su-ran	
2017	Rain or Shine	Yoon-ok	
2018	The Rich Son	Park Hyun-sook	
2019	The Tale of Nokdu	Cheon Hae-soo	
2019	Abyss	Eom Ae-ran	
2020	Live On	Ho-rang's mother (cameo, ep. 3)	
2021	Love Scene Number	Noh Sun-hwa	
2021–2026	Yumi's Cells	Yumi's mother (guest in ep. 10, 14 of season 1, ep. 8 of season 3)	
2022	Tomorrow	Jeong-im	
2022	Jinxed at First	Gong Soo-gwang's mother	
2022	Extraordinary Attorney Woo	Jeon Gyeong-hee	
2022	The Interest of Love	Yoon Mi-sun	
2024	Flex X Cop	Ko Mi-sook	
2024	Beauty and Mr. Romantic	Kim Sun-young	
2026	Reborn Rookie	Cho Seon-hee	
2026	Love on the Menu	Go Yoon-hee	

=== Web series ===
Year	Title	Role	Ref.
2021	The Birth of a Nation	Min Bok-ja	
2022	Welcome to Wedding Hell	Park Mi-sook	
2023–2026	Bloodhounds	Yoon So-yeon	

=== Television shows ===
Year	Title	Role	Ref.
1977	Hodori and Tosooni	Host	
1995	Afternoon Parade with Jeon Young-ho and Yoon Yoo-sun	DJ	
2011	Scent of Sky with Kang Seok-woo and Yoon Yoo-sun	Host	
2012	Welcome to Sea World	Panelist	
2021	I Need Women	Main cast	
2022	Hot Singers	Cast member	

=== Radio shows ===
Year	Title	Role	Notes	Ref.
2023–present	Home Music	DJ	March 27, 2023–present	

== Theater ==
Year	Title	Role	Ref.
1982	Snow White	Snow White	
1995	Being Lucky Neither at Cards Nor at Love	Hong-do	
2006	Helen Keller	Anne Sullivan	

== Awards and nominations ==
Name of the award ceremony, year presented, category, nominee of the award, and the result of the nomination
Award ceremony	Year	Category	Nominee / Work	Result	Ref.
Baeksang Arts Awards	1989	Best New Actress – Television	Land	Won	
Grand Bell Awards	1994	Best New Actress	The Story of Two Women	Won	
KBS Drama Awards	1985	Excellence Award, Actress	Even If the Wind Blows	Won	
KBS Drama Awards	1985	Popularity Award	Even If the Wind Blows	Won	
MBC Drama Awards	2018	Excellence Award, Actress in a Soap Opera	The Rich Son	Nominated	
MBC Entertainment Awards	2011	Top Excellence Award, Actress in a Sitcom or Comedy	High Kick: Revenge of the Short Legged	Won	
SBS Drama Awards	2010	Best Supporting Actress in a Drama Special	My Girlfriend Is a Nine-Tailed Fox	Nominated	
SBS Drama Awards	2014	Special Award, Actress in a Serial Drama	One Well-Raised Daughter	Nominated	
