= The Story of Two Women =

- Theatrical poster for The Story of Two Women (1994)
- Hangul: 두 여자 이야기
- Hanja: 두 女子 이야기
- RR: Du yeoja iyagi
- MR: Tu yŏja iyagi
- Directed by: Lee Jung-gook
- Written by: Jonathan You
- Produced by: Park Tae-hwan
- Starring: Kim Seo-ra; Yoon Yoo-sun
- Cinematography: Choi Chan-kyu
- Edited by: Kim Hyeon
- Music by: Kang In-goo
- Distributed by: Koryo Films Co., Ltd.
- Release date: April 22, 1994
- Running time: 103 minutes
- Country: South Korea
- Language: Korean

The Story of Two Women (Korean: 두 여자 이야기; RR: Du yeoja iyagi) is a 1994 South Korean drama film directed by Lee Jung-gook. It was awarded Best Film at the Grand Bell Awards ceremony. Other awards won by the film included Best New Director for Lee, Best Screenplay and Best New Actress for Yoon Yoo-sun.

== Plot ==
This drama depicts the difficult lives of women in the post-Korean War era.

== Cast ==
- Kim Seo-ra
- Yoon Yoo-sun
- Jung Dong-hwan
- Kim Hee-ra
- Nam Su-jung
- Kim Bok-hee
- Kim Jae-seong

== Bibliography ==
- "Duyeoja iyagi". The Complete Index to World Film. Archived from the original on 2012-09-08.

Preceded by Sopyonje	Grand Bell Awards for Best Film; 1994	Succeeded by The Eternal Empire
