= Confession (2015 film) =

- Directed by: Jung Young-bae
- Starring: Kim Young-ho; Yoon In-jo; Choi Cheol-ho
- Distributed by: Myung Films
- Release date: August 20, 2015
- Running time: 101 minutes
- Country: South Korea
- Language: Korean

Confession (Korean: 고백; RR: Gobaek) is a 2015 South Korean film starring Kim Young-ho, Yoon In-jo and Choi Cheol-ho. The mystery film, directed by Jung Young-bae, is about a man who tries to uncover the truth about his past.

== Plot ==
Sang-woo (Kim Young-ho) lost his memory after an accident. He becomes suspicious about his past, and when he finds out his wife's affair, he becomes obsessed to uncover the truth.

== Cast ==
- Kim Young-ho as Sang-woo
- Yoon In-jo as Yoon-hee
- Choi Cheol-ho as Min-sik
- Choo So-young as Mi-hyun
