= Jung Young-bae =

South Korean film director

- Born: South Korea
- Occupation: Film director

Korean name
- Hangul: 정영배
- RR: Jeong Yeongbae
- MR: Chŏng Yŏngbae

Jung Young-bae is a South Korean film director. Jung, a former television producer, debuted with the family drama Cherry Tomato (2008). That same year, he released his second film Santamaria (2008), a comedy which starred Jung Woong-in and Sung Ji-ru. His third film, an erotic drama A Pharisee (2014), won Best New Actress (for Viki, a former member of Dal Shabet) and Best New Cinematographer at the 34th Golden Cinema Festival in 2014.

His latest film Confession (2015) is a mystery film about a man who lost his memory after an accident and becomes obsessed to uncover the truth about his past when he finds out his wife is having an affair.

== Filmography ==
- Cherry Tomato (2008) - director, script editor
- Santamaria (2008) - director, script editor
- A Pharisee (2014) - director, script editor
- Confession (2015) - director
