= Summer Whispers =

- Theatrical poster
- Directed by: Kim Eun-joo
- Written by: Kim Eun-joo
- Produced by: Pyun Jang-wan; Kim Eun-joo
- Starring: Lee Young-eun; Ha Seok-jin
- Cinematography: Seo Ki-won
- Edited by: Kyung Min-ho
- Distributed by: CJ Entertainment
- Release date: October 16, 2008
- Running time: 96 minutes
- Country: South Korea
- Language: Korean

Summer Whispers (Korean: 여름, 속삭임; RR: Yeoreum, soksagim) is a 2008 South Korean romance film starring Lee Young-eun and Ha Seok-jin. It is written and directed by first-time director Kim Eun-joo. Lee was nominated Best New Actress at the 46th Grand Bell Awards in 2009.

== Plot ==
Professor Noh decides to visit his son in America after losing his wife. He asks his student (Young-jo) and a young man (Yoon-soo) from the flower shop to take care of his house. Young-jo arranges his books in the morning, while Yoon-soo tends to the garden in the afternoon. Although they do not meet, they come to know each other through the traces each left in the house and through the Professor's cat whom Young-jo is allergic to.

== Cast ==
- Lee Young-eun as Young-jo
- Ha Seok-jin as Yoon-soo
- Choi Jong-won as Professor Noh
- Woo Sang-min as Professor Noh's wife
- Jung Woo as Jung-sik
- Choi Yoon-jung as Shin-hee
- Kim Hyung-beom as movie director
- Gu Bon-im as Kyung-sook
- Shin Cheol-jin as supermarket owner
