= Samsung and unions =

Labor groups associated with workers of Samsung

Samsung Group historically had a no-union policy, but that changed when trade unions and strike actions were initiated across South Korea and India. Electronics manufacturer Samsung Electronics has assembly plants and sales networks in 74 countries and employs more than 270,000 workers. Samsung engaged in union-busting activities around the world, setting up management unions, surveilling workers and retaliating against union drives.

== India ==
Samsung India Workers Union (SIWU; Tamil: Samsung India Thozhilalargal Sangam) was formally recognized in January 2026, under the Indian Trade Union Act. SIWU represents 1,350 workers out of 1,850 in the Sriperumbudur plant near Chennai, Tamil Nadu. SIWU is affiliated to the left wing Centre of Indian Trade Unions.

1,500 Samsung Electronics production workers in the Sriperumbudur plant went on an indefinite strike from 8 September to October 2024. The Sriperumbudur plant is one of two smaller plants established in 2007, India, employing 1,800 workers. The strikers were part of a newly formed trade union Samsung India Labour Welfare Union, supported by the Centre of Indian Trade Unions. The strike demands included union recognition, no recognition of competing unions, and collective bargaining rights. 104 workers were briefly arrested for taking part in an unregistered protest march.

== South Korea ==
Individual trade unions represented different companies and divisions within Samsung Group in South Korea before 2024. There is internal union competition, to have a representative status numerically in order to represent workers during collective bargaining negotiations. Samsung Electronics has been unionized since 2021, and its subsidiary Samsung Electronics Service since 2014.

In January 2024, different trade unions representing Samsung Electronics (device experience), Samsung Fire & Marine Insurance, Samsung Display and Samsung Biologics and Samsung Electro-Mechanics (planned) coalesced as a Super-Enterprise Labor Union. It had 13,000 members which was similar to Samsung Electronics Labor Union which had 14,000 members.

=== Samsung Electronics Service ===
Samsung Electronics Service is a subsidiary of Samsung Electronics and relies on in-house subcontractor firms that are de facto owned by Samsung. In July 2013, the Samsung Electronics Service Workers was created. It is affiliated to the Korean Metal Workers' Union which is part of IndustriALL Global Union.

Yeom Ho-seok, a worker and Yangsan union branch leader committed suicide in his car on 17 May 2014; the second Samsung worker to do so. He left a note:

I'm in Jeongdongjin now. When you find my body, please don't bury me until the day our chapter achieves victory. On the day of our chapter's victory, I want you to cremate me and sprinkle my ashes here.

— Yeom Ho-seok, suicide note

On 17 May, Yeom's father transferred legal custody of Yeom's body to the union, per his son's dying wish. The next day, the father changed his mind and police snatched Yeom's corpse from the hospital, arresting 20 union members in the process. The last time a corpse was taken by police was in 1991 after a similar worker suicide protest.

Initially, Samsung Electronics claimed no responsibility for its subcontractors, but after series of strikes including suicide starting in January 2014, the union reached a basic collective agreement in June 2014.

=== Samsung Electronics ===
In August 2021, Samsung Electronics signed a collective agreement with 4 different trade unions. This happened after Samsung vice chairman Lee Jae-yong was released from prison for corruption including union busting. A year prior in May 2020, Lee Jae-yong apologized for Samsung's union-busting.

There were 5 trade unions active at Samsung Electronics as of August 2024;

- Office Workers' Union
- Gumi Network Union
- National Samsung Electronics Union (Korean: 전국삼성전자노동조합; represents 28,000 workers or a quarter of total workforce)
- Donghaeng Union
- DX (Device Experience) Union

Samsung Electronics employees went on a one-day strike on 7 June 2024. It was the first time employees in the Samsung Group went on strike. The strike was led by the National Samsung Electronics Union (NSEU) and is the largest of 5 trade unions at Samsung.

6,500 workers went on a strike on 8 July 2024, which was initially planned to be for three days but was converted into an indefinite strike due to lack of response from management. The strike ended on 1 August, under institutional pressure and falling numbers, though the union said it intended to continue fighting for its demands with other tactics.

NSEU had representative bargaining rights on behalf of all 5 unions until 5 August 2024, when the collective agreement expires. Other trade unions would be eligible to petition for representative bargaining rights on behalf of all trade unions. Donghaeng Union indicated they will compete with NSEU for this right. Son Woo-mok, the chair of NSEU in August, announced they will merge into Office Workers' Union on 5 October in order to consolidate their strength.

After ending the strike on 5 August, NSEU announced it will shift strategies to "guerrilla" strikes. The staggered strikes returned on the anniversary of Liberation Day, 15 August through 18 August. The workers demanded a 5.6% wage increase, holiday on union anniversary and compensation for lost wages during the strikes, while management offered a 5.1% increase.

In November 2025, Samsung Electronics Co. Union (SECU), Samsung Electronics Labor Union (SELU), and National Samsung Electronics Union formed a coalition around removing performance-based bonus caps and "allocations equal to 15 percent of annual operating profit." SELU was the representative union, being the largest. In March 2026, 93% of workers who cast ballots voted in favor of striking, citing Samsung's lower wages compared to rival company SK Hynix. In May 2026, SECU withdrew from the joint negotiations due to a disproportionate focus on the semiconductor division. A tentative wage agreement was reached before the planned 18-day strike.

=== Samsung Biologics ===
Samsung Biologics' union has 3,689 members, 75% of the company’s workforce, as of March 2026. In March 2026, 95.52% of union members voted to strike, citing unfair labor practices, unauthorized use of employee personal data, and "deep structural concerns" with the company's ESG policies. In April 2026, the Incheon District Court allowed a planned strike to proceed but restricted it from allowing the "deterioration or spoilage of thawed cell lines." The five-day strike began on May 1, marking the first in the company's history.

== United States ==
=== StarPlus Energy ===
In 2025, United Auto Workers began representing StarPlus Energy, a joint venture in Indiana between Samsung SDI and Stellantis.

== See also ==
- Protests against Samsung
- Microsoft and unions
- Tech unions
- Another Promise – 2014 film by Kim Tae-yun

== External ==
- National Samsung Electronics Union (Official website in Korean)
