= Lee Jung-gook =

South Korean filmmaker (born 1957)

- Born: August 20, 1957 (age 69); South Korea
- Occupations: Film director, screenwriter
- Years active: 1990–present

Korean name
- Hangul: 이정국
- RR: I Jeongguk
- MR: I Chŏngguk

Lee Jung-gook (Korean: 이정국; born August 20, 1957) is a South Korean film director and screenwriter. Lee's feature debut Song of Resurrection (1990) was banned as its plot deals with the 1980 Gwangju Uprising. He won critical acclaim for his second feature The Story of Two Women (1994) by winning numerous awards at the 32nd Grand Bell Awards, including Best Film, Best New Director and Best New Actress, and Best New Director at the 14th Korean Association of Film Critics Awards in 1994. A Thai version of The Letter was made in 2004, with the same title.

== Filmography ==
- Daydream (short film, 1984) - director, screenwriter, producer, editor
- The Fire of Tandra (1984) - assistant director
- I Stand Everyday (1990) - screenwriter
- Song of Resurrection (1990) - director, screenwriter
- Song of Resurrection (1993) - director, screenwriter
- The Story of Two Women (1994) - director, script editor
- The Man in the Sun (1994) - screenwriter
- Channel 69 (1996) - director, script editor
- The Letter (1997) - director, screenwriter
- Promenade (2000) - director, screenwriter
- Blue (2003) - director
- Mandarin Ghost (short film, 2006) - director, music director, producer, screenwriter
- Resurrection of the Butterfly (2007) - director, script editor

== Awards ==
- 1994 14th Korean Association of Film Critics Awards: Best New Director (The Story of Two Women)
