= Another Promise =

2014 film by Kim Tae-yun

- Directed by: Kim Tae-yun
- Written by: Kim Tae-yun
- Produced by: Lee Won-jae; Park Sung-il; Yoon Ki-ho
- Starring: Park Chul-min; Kim Gyu-ri; Yoon Yoo-sun; Park Hee-jung
- Cinematography: Choi Young-hwan
- Edited by: Mun Se-gyeong
- Music by: Yeon Ri-mok
- Production companies: Another Promise Film Production Committee; Eightball Pictures
- Distributed by: OAL Media Contents Group
- Release dates: October 4, 2013 (Busan International Film Festival); February 6, 2014 (South Korea)
- Running time: 120 min.
- Country: South Korea
- Language: Korean
- Budget: US$1.3 million

Another Promise (Korean: 또 하나의 약속; RR: Tto hanaui yaksok) is a 2014 South Korean drama film based on the true story about the legal battle between Korean conglomerate Samsung and its employees who contracted leukemia.

It was the first film in Korean cinematic history to have been both invested and produced solely by crowdfunding. A total of ₩1.5 billion (US$1.3 million) was raised through 7,722 private donations – 7,500 people donated ₩303 million (US$285,123), while more than 100 small firms gave another ₩1 billion. All the actors in the cast starred in the film for free.

To avoid possible legal action, the film's producers altered its original title from Another Family (Korean: 또 하나의 가족; RR: Tto hanaui gajok) – a well known Samsung advertising slogan – while the on-screen electronics company is called Jinsung. Director Kim Tae-yun further clarified that there had been no request for a title change from Samsung, and that he voluntarily did it because he "wanted the audiences to concentrate more on the drama itself, not the company."

== Plot ==
Shortly after graduating from high school, Yoon-mi begins looking for a job in order to earn money to help support her struggling family; she especially wants to pay for her younger brother Yoon-seok's tuition when he goes to college in the next few years. Her father Sang-gu, a taxi driver in Gangwon Province, is proud and overjoyed when Yoon-mi gets hired as a factory worker at the Jinsung semiconductor factory. But just two years later he learns that his daughter has been diagnosed with leukemia; four years after her diagnosis, Yoon-mi dies in the backseat of Sang-gu's cab. After learning that a number of Yoon-mi's coworkers at the factory are also suffering unlikely diseases, Sang-gu is convinced that Jinsung is responsible for his late daughter's disease and death. He makes a visit to a labor attorney to file a claim against the most powerful conglomerate in the country. Sang-gu and his family, along with their attorney and other families of leukemia patients, are soon shaken up as the company uses different methods of appeasement and pressure to keep the families from uniting, among them offering money to keep the issue from becoming public. Jinsung workers also spy on the families of the plaintiffs, stalk them and threaten them, all for the sake of their company, which they genuinely believe to be in the right. People become reluctant to be a witness for trial, either because of their loyalty to the company or for the well-being of their families. But Sang-gu is determined to continue in his quest for truth and justice.

== Cast ==
- Park Chul-min – Han Sang-gu
- Kim Gyu-ri – Yoo Nan-joo
- Yoon Yoo-sun – Yoon Jeong-im
- Park Hee-jung – Han Yoon-mi
- Yoo Se-hyung – Han Yoon-seok
- Kim Young-jae – Department head Lee
- Jung Young-ki – Chae Do-young
- Lee Geung-young – Kyo-ik
- Jung Jin-young – Judge
- Kim Chang-hoi – Kim Jong-dae
- Park Hyuk-kwon – Park Jeong-hyeok
- Oh Dae-hwan – Reporter Go
- Jang So-yeon
- Kim Seon-yeong
- Im Jong-yoon – Vice president

== Background ==
The film is a fictionalized account of the real-life story of Hwang Sang-ki, a taxi driver based in Sokcho, Gangwon Province, and his four-year legal battle against Samsung, one of the world's largest technology companies and a major contributor to the South Korean economy. His daughter Hwang Yu-mi was diagnosed with an advanced stage of leukemia two years after working at a Samsung semiconductor factory; she died in 2007 at age 23, four years after her initial hiring.

Samsung's official stance was that there was no causal relationship between Hwang's employment with them and her sickness. Company sources pointed out that the incidence of hematological cancers, such as leukemia, in the semiconductor industry, was lower than the national average for South Korea. They also cite that independent research, including a three-year review by the Korea Occupational Safety and Health Agency, and a study by the US consulting firm Environ International, had found no correlation between the workplace environment and employee illness. According to the Supporters for the Health and Rights of People in the Semiconductor Industry (SHARPS), however, the rare form of leukemia that affected Hwang Yu-mi is found in only 4.2 in every 100,000 South Koreans aged between 20 and 29. Hwang Sang-ki said that Samsung offered him a ₩10 billion settlement in exchange for dropping the compensation claim, but he rejected the offer. "After I turned down an offer of one million dollars, they basically asked me to name my price," he said. "But there was no way I could take their money, not when I knew that other families were suffering."

Hwang filed his lawsuit with The Korea Workers' Compensation and Welfare Service (KCOMWEL), a government agency that compensates workers and levies companies to fund the payouts. KCOMWEL found Samsung innocent, stating that there was no evidence to suggest that Hwang Yu-mi died from a work-related illness.

There was little media attention on the case until 2011, when the Seoul administrative court overturned the KCOMWEL verdict, ruling that toxic chemicals at Samsung plants "had caused, or at least expedited" cases of cancer in two workers, Hwang Yu-mi included. The ruling was the first case in which an individual won a suit against a Korean conglomerate. KCOMWEL has currently filed an appeal. Since Hwang's victory, other victims and their families have begun filing similar suits.

About 200 workers have made similar allegations against Samsung and other memory chipmakers, according to SHARPS. Lee Jong-ran, an industrial health rights activist and lawyer, said that from 2008 to 2013, 39 Samsung Electronics employees have filed compensation claims with the KCOMWEL for job-related illness; three were successful, 15 are still under review by the agency and 21 were rejected. Most of the semiconductor industry workers who turned to SHARPS were in their 20s and 30s when they fell ill. As of February 2014, more than 50 have since died.

Samsung has not officially commented on the movie, but Kim Sun-beom, spokesman of Samsung's device solutions department, posted an online rebuttal on the company's official blog Samsung Tomorrow, saying that the movie was an "unfair depiction" and "oversimplification" of the situation, and raised concerns that the company's image was being demonized.

However, with the effect of the movie, Samsung admitted on May 14, 2014, for the allegations that made former employees fallen ill after working for the company, promising compensation to those with leukemia and other ailments. Samsung had agreed to set up an independent mediation committee to look at the cases of workers who have fallen ill and agree compensation. Samsung also promised an evaluation of working conditions in its factories.

The company did not follow all recommendations of the mediation committee, however, and instead installed a "Compensation Committee" on its own. Shortly afterward it was reported that Samsung had paid out some victims outside of the scheme with so-called 'hush' money, which includes no admitting of wrongdoing and the condition to drop all further claims. This prompted SHARPS to ask the public for help by publishing a letter urging Samsung to implement the mediation committee's recommendations. The letter was signed by more than 10,000 people. On October 7, 2015, a sit-in was started in front of Samsung's headquarters in Seoul. Since then Samsung has not resumed talks with SHARPS or the other victim's families.

== Release ==
Another Promise premiered in the Panorama section of the 18th Busan International Film Festival in October 2013, then received a theatrical release on February 6, 2014. Despite good reviews from BIFF and strong advance ticket sales, it was only shown on 100 screens nationwide – a third of the expected number.

== Trivia ==
Actress Park Hee-Jung actually shaved her head on-screen for the role. This was to accurately depict the effects of chemotherapy.

== See also ==
- Samsung and unions
