= Four Toes =

- Directed by: Gye Yun-shik
- Written by: Gye Yun-shik
- Starring: Huh Joon-ho; Lee Chang-hoon; Park Jun-gyu; Lee Won-jong
- Cinematography: Yang Hee-man
- Edited by: Ko Im-pyo
- Release date: May 10, 2002
- Running time: 95 minutes
- Country: South Korea
- Language: Korean

Four Toes is a 2002 South Korean action-comedy film. The story involves four friends who become gangsters. As the film progresses they gain power and eventually find their way to Seoul.

== Cast ==
- Huh Joon-ho - Audie
- Lee Chang-hoon - Lecaf
- Park Jun-gyu - Gak Granger
- Lee Won-jong - Haetae
- Kim Kap-soo - Bacchus
- Ahn Suk-hwan
- Ko Ku-ma
- Jung Eun-pyo
- Seo Jin-won - Plum

== See also ==
- List of Korean-language films
- Korean cinema
