= Park Hee-jung (actress) =

South Korean actress and model (born 1991)

- Born: October 20, 1988 (age 38); Jeonju, South Korea
- Other name: Park Hee-jeong
- Education: Dankook University – Theater and Film
- Occupation: Actress
- Years active: 2010–present

Korean name
- Hangul: 박희정
- RR: Bak Huijeong
- MR: Pak Hŭijŏng

Park Hee-jung (Korean: 박희정; born October 20, 1988) is a South Korean actress and model. She is best known for her role as a protagonist in the 2014 film Another Promise. She actually shaved her head for the film.

== Filmography ==
Year	Title	Role	Genre
2011	Sunny	Young-jin	Film
2014	Another Promise	Han Yoon-mi	Film
2017	New Trial	Myung-hee	Film
2017	Bluebeard	Opening D	Film
2026	Filing for Love	Ki-jun's youngest older sister	Television series
